= List of Claxton Shield champions =

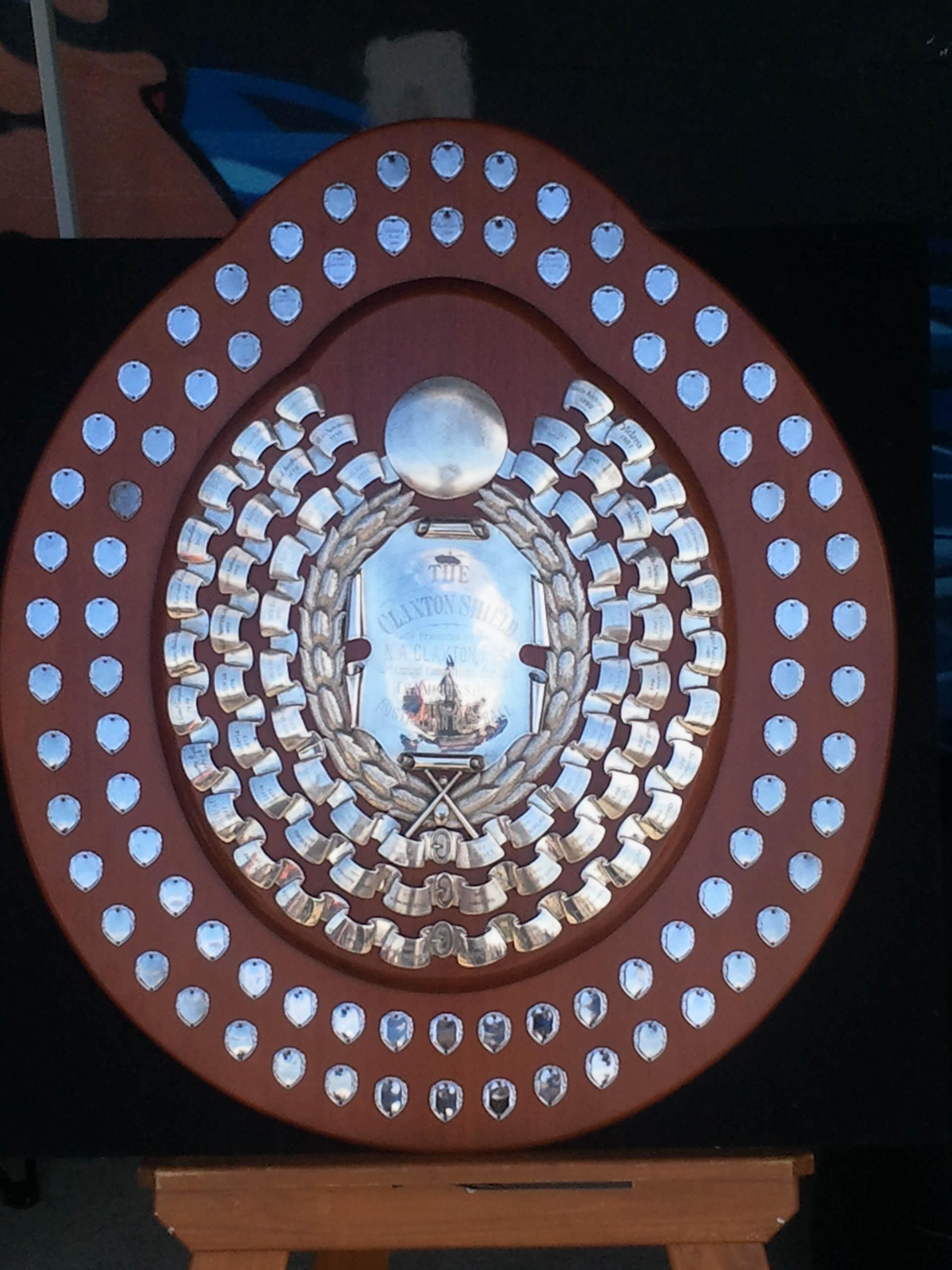
Claxton Shield (Australian baseball trophy) displayed in August 2013 by the 2013 championship team, Canberra Cavalry

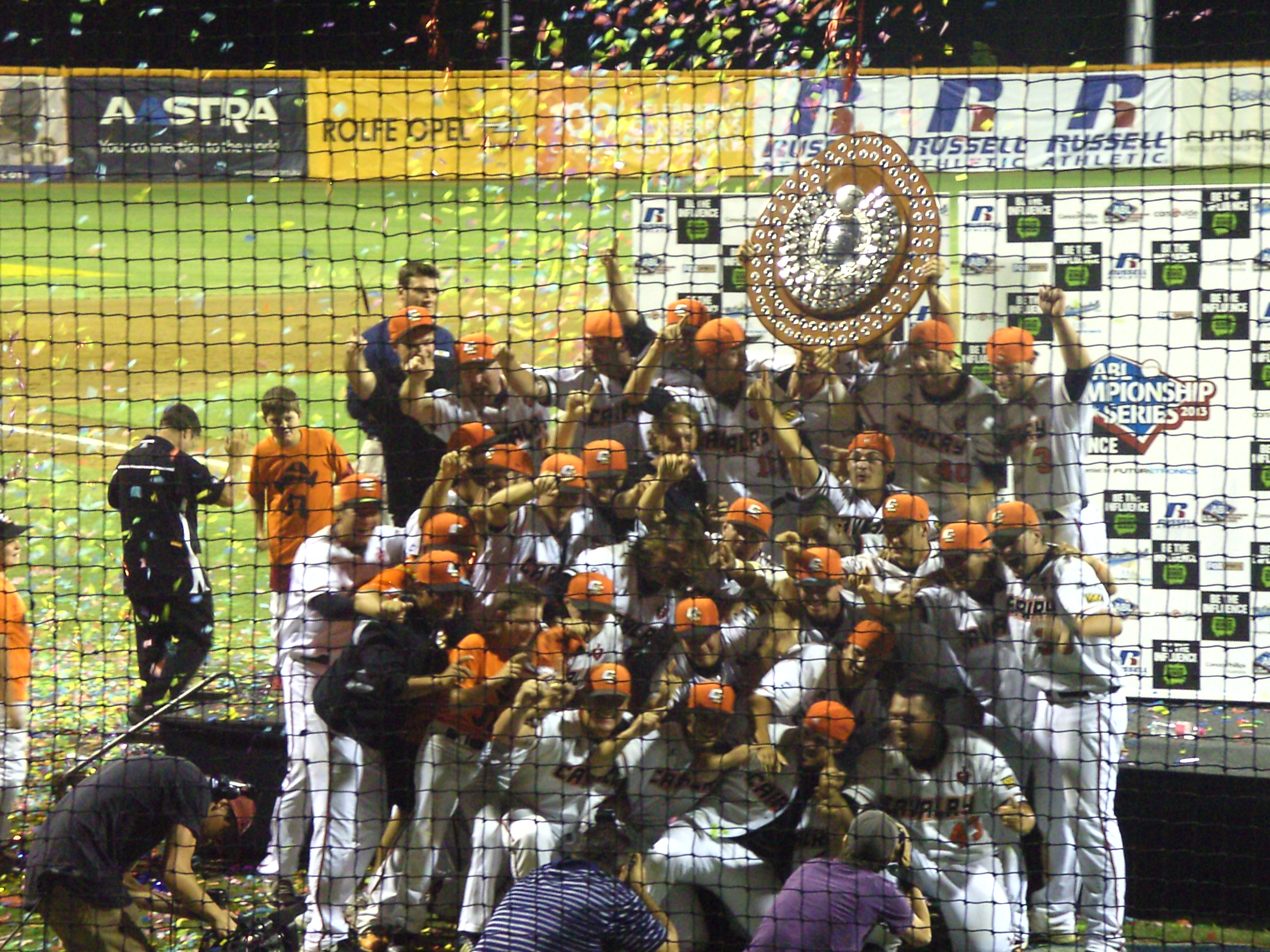
The Canberra Cavalry team celebrating with the Claxton Shield, after winning the 2012–13 ABL championship series

The Claxton Shield was the premier baseball competition in Australia, first held in 1934 and last held in 2010. The Claxton Shield is also the name of the trophy awarded to the champion team, and has also been awarded to winners of both the original Australian Baseball League (ABL) and the International Baseball League of Australia (IBLA). The current version of the Australian Baseball League uses the Claxton Shield as its championship trophy in the same way as its predecessor of the same name did.

There had been interstate baseball tournaments held prior to the start of the Claxton Shield. The first was held in Hobart in 1910, won by New South Wales defeating Victoria and hosts Tasmania. New South Wales repeated the feat in 1912 in Melbourne when they won again, this time with the addition of South Australia. None were held regularly though, and they did not always involve all baseball–playing states. In 1934 Norrie Claxton was the principal driver of an annual national competition, and donated the shield to be awarded to the champions. Though it was originally intended to be permanently held by the first team to win in three consecutive years, when South Australia won the first three tournaments all participating states agreed that it should be a perpetual shield, and named it the Claxton Shield in honour of Norrie Claxton.

The Victoria Aces were the last team to win the shield under the Claxton Shield format, having won the 2010 tournament by defeating South Australia two games to nil in the final series. It was the eighteenth time the Aces had won the shield, and the twenty second time it had been won by a Victorian team—the most by any state—including three times by the Waverley / Melbourne Reds and once by the Melbourne Monarchs. The Adelaide Giants currently hold the shield after overcoming the Perth Heat in the 2023–24 Australian Baseball League season. It was the Adelaide Giants first ABL title and seventeen time a South Australian team has won the Claxton Shield. Though city-based teams have competed for the Claxton Shield in some seasons, including under the current ABL format, the name engraved on the shield is that of the winning state; for the 2010–11 ABL season won by the Perth Heat, "West Australia 2011" was engraved.

== Champions ==
=== Claxton Shield ===
Key
State Titles	The number of championships won by that state at the time. (Includes wins by ABL/IBLA teams from the same state.)
Team Titles	The number of championships won by that team at the time. (Treats ABL/IBLA teams as separate from the state teams.)
†	Denotes most championships by a team/state at the time.
‡	Denotes tied for most championships by a team/state at the time.
*	Denotes member of Baseball Australia Hall of Fame.

Year	Champion Team	State Titles	Team Titles	Final Host	Helms Award Winner	Ref
1934	South Australia	1^{†}	1^{†}	Adelaide, SA		
1935	South Australia	2^{†}	2^{†}	Melbourne, Vic		
1936	South Australia	3^{†}	3^{†}	Sydney, NSW		
1937	New South Wales	1	1	Adelaide, SA		
1938	New South Wales	2	2	Perth, WA		
1939	New South Wales	3^{‡}	3^{‡}	Melbourne, Vic		
No tournament held 1940–1945
1946	New South Wales	4^{†}	4^{†}	Sydney, NSW		
1947	Victoria	1	1	Adelaide, SA		
1948	Victoria	2	2	Perth, WA		
1949	Victoria	3	3	Melbourne, Vic		
1950	New South Wales	5^{†}	5^{†}	Sydney, NSW		
1951	New South Wales	6^{†}	6^{†}	Adelaide, SA		
1952	Western Australia	1	1	Perth, WA		
1953	New South Wales	7^{†}	7^{†}	Brisbane, Qld		
1954	Victoria	4	4	Melbourne, Vic		
1955	New South Wales	8^{†}	8^{†}	Sydney, NSW		
1956	Victoria	5	5	Adelaide, SA		
1957	South Australia	4	4	Perth, WA		
1958	Victoria	6	6	Brisbane, Qld		
1959	South Australia	5	5	Melbourne, Vic		
1960	South Australia	6	6	Sydney, NSW		
1961	South Australia	7	7	Adelaide, SA		
1962	Victoria	7	7	Perth, WA	(New South Wales) Anthony Strand	
1963	New South Wales	9^{†}	9^{†}	Brisbane, Qld	(New South Wales) Kevin Cantwell^{*}	
1964	South Australia	8	8	Melbourne, Vic	(South Australia) Adrian Pearce	
1965	Victoria	8	8	Sydney, NSW	(Victoria (state)) Graham Deany^{*}	
1966	South Australia	9^{‡}	9^{‡}	Adelaide, SA	(South Australia) Kevin Greatrex^{*}	
1967	South Australia	10^{†}	10^{†}	Perth, WA	(South Australia) Garry Thompson	
1968	Victoria	9	9	Brisbane, Qld	(Victoria (state)) John Swanson^{*}	
1969	South Australia	11^{†}	11^{†}	Melbourne, Vic	(South Australia) Neil Page^{*}	
1970	South Australia	12^{†}	12^{†}	Sydney, NSW	(New South Wales) Paul Russell	
1971	South Australia	13^{†}	13^{†}	Adelaide, SA	(Victoria (state)) Ron McIver	
1972	Victoria	10	10	Brisbane, Qld	(Western Australia) Don Knapp^{*}	
1973	Victoria	11	11	Perth, WA	(South Australia) David Mundy^{*}	
1974	Victoria	12	12	Melbourne, Vic	(Victoria (state)) Neil Buszard	
1975	Western Australia	2	2	Sydney, NSW	(Queensland) Larry Home^{*}	
1976	South Australia	14^{†}	14^{†}	Adelaide, SA	(Queensland) Alan Albury^{*}	
1977	Western Australia	3	3	Perth, WA	(Victoria (state)) Ron Owens	
1978	Western Australia	4	4	Brisbane, Qld	(Western Australia) Ray Michell^{*}	
1979	Western Australia	5	5	Melbourne, Vic	(Victoria (state)) Brian Wonnacott	
1980	South Australia	15^{†}	15^{†}	Sydney, NSW	(South Australia) John Galloway	
1981	Victoria	13	13	Adelaide, SA	(Victoria (state)) John Hodges	
1982	Queensland	1	1	Sydney, NSW	(Queensland) Geoff Martin	
1983	Queensland	2	2	Perth, WA	(Western Australia) Doug Mateljan^{*}	
1984	Victoria	14	14	Brisbane, Qld	(Victoria (state)) Brett Ward	
1985	Western Australia	6	6	Brisbane, Qld	(Western Australia) Tony Stall	
1986	Victoria	15^{‡}	15^{‡}	Sydney, NSW	(Victoria (state)) Lindsay Orford	
1987	Queensland	3	3	Brisbane, Qld	(Queensland) Dave Nilsson^{*}	
1988	Queensland	4	4	Brisbane, Qld	(Western Australia) Tony Adamson^{*}	
1989	New South Wales	10	10	Sydney, NSW	(Victoria (state)) Richard Vagg	
Replaced by ABL & IBLA 1989–2002
2003	Queensland Rams	8	5	Sydney, NSW	(New South Wales) Craig Lewis	
2004	New South Wales Patriots	12	11	Sydney, NSW	(Queensland) Brett Roneberg	
2005	New South Wales Patriots	13	12	Sydney, NSW	(Victoria (state)) Brad Harman	
2006	Queensland Rams	9	6	Sydney, NSW	(Queensland) Brad Dutton	
2007	(Victoria (state)) Victoria Aces	21^{†}	16^{†}	Perth, WA	(Victoria (state)) Matthew Kent	
2008	(Western Australia) Perth Heat	10	7	Sydney, NSW	(Western Australia) Clint Balgera	
2009	(Western Australia) Perth Heat	11	8	Perth, WA	(Western Australia) Nick Kimpton	
2010	(Victoria (state)) Victoria Aces	22^{†}	17^{†}	Melbourne, Vic	(New South Wales) Wayne Lundgren	

=== Australian Baseball League (1989–1999) ===
Season	Champion Team	Games	Runner Up	Team Titles	State Titles	League MVP	Ref
1989–90	(Victoria (state)) Waverley Reds	3–1	(Victoria (state)) Melbourne Monarchs	1^{†}	16^{†}	(Victoria (state)) Phil Dale (WR)	
1990–91	(Western Australia) Perth Heat	3–2	(Queensland) Daikyo Dolphins	1^{‡}	7	(Queensland) David Nilsson (DD)	
1991–92	(Queensland) Daikyo Dolphins	3–1	(Western Australia) Perth Heat	1^{‡}	5	(Queensland) Adrian Meagher (DD)	
1992–93	(Victoria (state)) Melbourne Monarchs	2–0	(Western Australia) Perth Heat	1^{‡}	17^{†}	(United States) Kevin Jordan (BB)	
1993–94	(Queensland) Brisbane Bandits	2–0	(New South Wales) Sydney Blues	1^{‡}	6	(United States) Homer Bush (BB)	
1994–95	(Victoria (state)) Waverley Reds	2–0	(Western Australia) Perth Heat	2^{†}	18^{†}	(Western Australia) Scott Metcalf (PH)	
1995–96	(New South Wales) Sydney Blues	2–0	(Victoria (state)) Melbourne Reds	1	11	(New South Wales) Gary White (SB)	
1996–97	(Western Australia) Perth Heat	2–1	(Queensland) Brisbane Bandits	2^{‡}	8	(South Australia) Andrew Scott (AG)	
1997–98	(Victoria (state)) Melbourne Reds	2–0	(Queensland) Gold Coast Cougars	3^{†}	19^{†}	(New South Wales) Brendan Kingman (SS)	
1998–99	(Queensland) Gold Coast Cougars	2–0	(New South Wales) Sydney Storm	2	7	(Victoria (state)) Adam Burton (MR)	

=== International Baseball League of Australia ===
Season	Champion Team	Games	Runner Up	Team Titles	State Titles	Helms Award Winner	Ref
1999–2000	(Western Australia) Perth Heat	2–1	Queensland Rams	1^{†}	9	(New South Wales) Chris Snelling	
2002	(Victoria (state)) Victoria Aces	1–0	(Western Australia) Perth Heat	1^{‡}	20^{†}	(New South Wales) Rodney van Buizen	

=== Australian Baseball League (2010–present) ===
Season	Champion Team	Games	Runner Up	Team Titles	State Titles	Helms Award Winner	Ref
2010–11	(Western Australia) Perth Heat	2–1	(South Australia) Adelaide Bite	1^{†}	12	(United States) James McOwen (ADE)	
2011–12	(Western Australia) Perth Heat	2–1	(Victoria (state)) Melbourne Aces	2^{†}	13	(Western Australia) Tim Kennelly (PER)	
2012–13	(Australian Capital Territory) Canberra Cavalry	2–0	(Western Australia) Perth Heat	1	1	(United States) Adam Buschini (CAN)	
2013–14	(Western Australia) Perth Heat	2–0	(Australian Capital Territory) Canberra Cavalry	3^{†}	14	(United States) Ryan Casteel (MEL)	
2014–15	(Western Australia) Perth Heat	2–1	(South Australia) Adelaide Bite	4^{†}	15	(United States) Aaron Miller (ADE)	
2015–16	(Queensland) Brisbane Bandits	2–0	(South Australia) Adelaide Bite	1	10	(United States) Justin Williams (BRI)	
2016–17	(Queensland) Brisbane Bandits	2–0	(Victoria (state)) Melbourne Aces	2	11	(Queensland) Aaron Whitefield (BRI)	
2017–18	(Queensland) Brisbane Bandits	2–1	(Australian Capital Territory) Canberra Cavalry	3	12	(United States) Jake Fraley (PER)	
2018–19	(Queensland) Brisbane Bandits	2–0	(Western Australia) Perth Heat	4	13	(Western Australia) Tim Kennelly (PER) (Germany) Marcus Solbach (ADE)	
2019–20	(Victoria (state)) Melbourne Aces	2–0	(South Australia) Adelaide Bite	1	23		
2020–21	(Victoria (state)) Melbourne Aces	1–0	(Western Australia) Perth Heat	2	24		
2021–22	Season cancelled due to COVID-19						
2022–23	(South Australia) Adelaide Giants	2–1	(Western Australia) Perth Heat	1	16	Alex Hall (PER)	
2023- 24	Adelaide Giants	2-1	Perth Heat	2	17	Lachlan Wells (ADE)	
2024-25	Canberra Cavalry	2-0	Perth Heat	2	2	Alexander Wells (SYD)	
2025-26	Adelaide Giants	2-1	Sydney Blue Sox	3	18	Devin Saltiban (ADL)	

=== Championships by state ===
Rank	State	Titles	Most Recent	Tournaments Contested
1st	Victoria	24	2019–20	78
2nd	South Australia	18	2025-26	78
3rd	Western Australia	15	2014–15	73
=4th	Queensland	13	2018-19	68
=4th	New South Wales	13	2005	75
6th	Australian Capital Territory	2	2024-25	18
=7th	Northern Territory	0		8
=7th	New Zealand	0		2
"Titles" includes seasons of the ABL & IBLA.

== See also ==
- Australian Baseball Federation
- Australian Baseball League (2010–Current)
- Australian Baseball League (1989–1999)
- International Baseball League of Australia

== Bibliography ==
- Flintoff, Peter; Dunn, Adrian (August 1998). Australian Baseball League Almanac (1998 ed.). Melbourne: Flintoff & Dunn.
- Flintoff, Peter; Dunn, Adrian (January 2000). Australian Major League Baseball Almanac – The First Ten Years (1999 ed.). Melbourne: Flintoff & Dunn.
- Flintoff, Peter; Dunn, Adrian (September 2009). "2009 Claxton Review". Australian Major League Baseball Almanac (2009 ed.). Melbourne: Flintoff & Dunn. Archived from the original on 10 April 2011.
