= 1987 Claxton Shield =

1987 Claxton Shield Champions

Queensland
3rd title

The 1987 Claxton Shield was the 48th annual Claxton Shield. The participants were South Australia, New South Wales Patriots, Victoria Aces, Western Australia, Queensland Rams and Northern Territory. The series was won by Queensland, who took a 17–3 record into the final against Western Australia, before claiming their third title. Peter Vogler was named the MVP of the Finals Series against WA

During the Shield, the Buffaloes won their first (and only) game against South Australia.

The Helms Award was given to a seventeen year old Dave Nilsson of Queensland, who signed with the Milwaukee Brewers early in 1987 and would go on to be an MLB All-Star.
