= 1989 Claxton Shield =

Australian baseball tournament in Sidney

1987 Claxton Shield Champions

Queensland
5th title

The 1989 Claxton Shield was the 50th annual Claxton Shield and the final Shield in its traditional state format before the Australian Baseball League (1989–1999). The participants were South Australia, New South Wales Patriots, Victoria Aces, Western Australia and Northern Territory with the incumbent back to back champions Queensland absent. The tournament was held in Sydney over twelve days at Auburn Baseball Club's Oriole Park rather than a home and away series. The home New South Wales team were champions.

The Helms Award went to Richard Vagg of Victoria.
