= 1962 Claxton Shield =

1962 Claxton Shield Champions

Victoria
7th title

The 1962 Claxton Shield was the 23rd annual Claxton Shield, it was held in Perth, Western Australia thanks to a travelling pool to help the eastern states. The participants were South Australia, New South Wales, Victoria, Western Australia and Queensland. The series was won by Victoria claiming their sixth Shield title.

It was also the first year that a trophy sponsored by the Helms Foundation be awarded to the best player of the series in honour of South Australian player Ron Sharpe. It was to be called the Helms Award or Ron Sharpe Medal. The inaugural winner of this award was Anthony Strand from New South Wales.

The 1962 Shield was played in the warmer conditions during October, instead of the traditional late July winter period.
