= Norwood Oval =

Multipurpose stadium near Adelaide, Australia

- The Parade
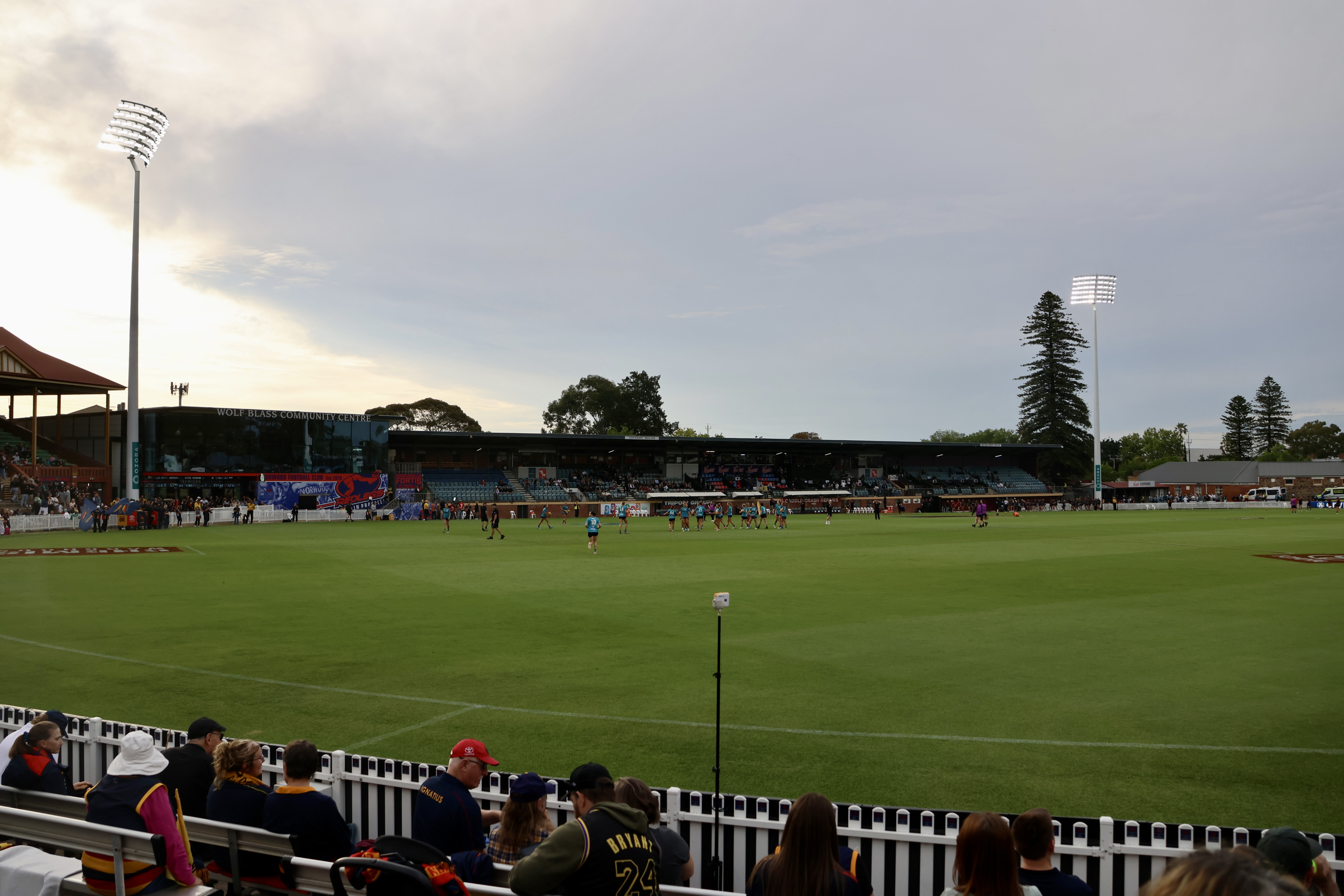
- View from the south-eastern end, 2025
- Interactive map of Norwood Oval
- Location: cnr The Parade and Woods St, Norwood, South Australia
- Coordinates: 34°55′11″S 138°37′50″E
- Owner: Norwood, Payneham & St Peters Council
- Operator: Norwood Football Club
- Capacity: 9,700
- Surface: Grass
- Record attendance: 20,280 – Norwood vs Port Adelaide, 1971
- Field size: Football: 165 m × 110 m (541 ft × 361 ft); Baseball: Left Field – 320 feet (98 m); Center Field – 390 feet (119 m); Right Field – 290 feet (88 m)

Construction
- Groundbreaking: Late 1890s
- Opened: 27 April 1901

Tenants
- Norwood Football Club (SANFL) (1901–present) Adelaide Crows (AFLW) (2017–2019, 2021–2025) Adelaide Bite (ABL) (2009–2016)

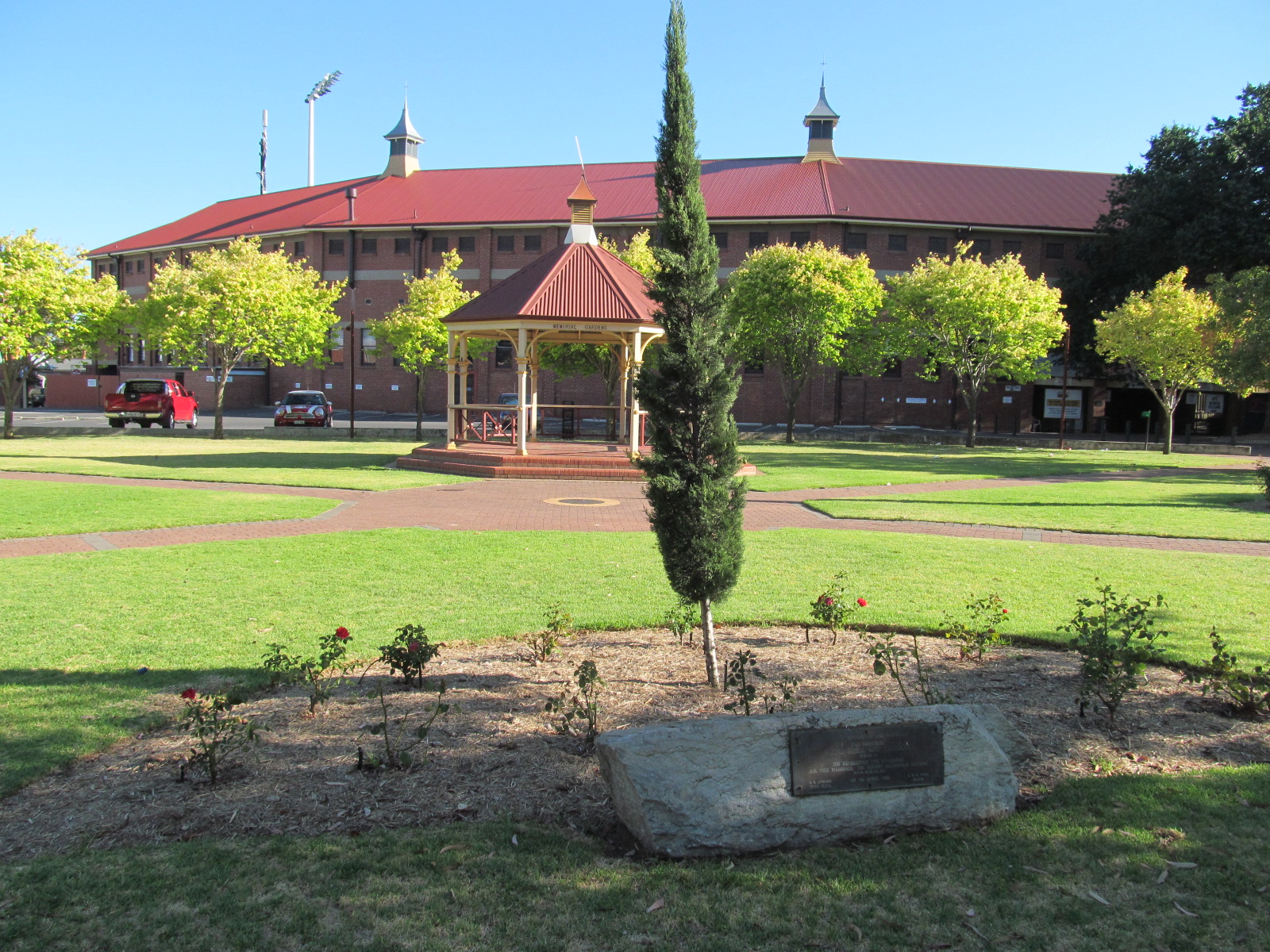
View towards the grandstands from the park on The Parade, January 2012

Norwood Oval (currently known as Coopers Stadium due to sponsorship from the Adelaide-based Coopers Brewery) is a suburban oval in the western end of Norwood, an inner eastern suburb of Adelaide, South Australia. The Oval has a capacity of 10,000 people, with grandstand seating for up to 3,900. Norwood Oval was built in 1901 and began hosting events from that year but was officially opened in 1906 to host football matches.

It is owned by Norwood, Payneham & St Peters Council but managed by the Norwood Football Club. Though mainly used for Australian rules football, the oval has been used for a variety of other sporting and community events including baseball, soccer, rugby league and American football. It is the home ground for the Norwood Football Club ("The Redlegs") in the South Australian National Football League (SANFL) and the primary home ground of the Adelaide Crows in AFL Women's (AFLW).

The oval is one of two sporting venues in Adelaide to carry the name of Coopers Stadium. The other is the soccer specific Hindmarsh Stadium which also has naming rights sponsorship from Coopers Brewery.

== Ground Opening ==
On Saturday afternoon 27th April 1901, in the presence of about 900 people, the Norwood Oval was declared open. There was a representative gathering at the opening, including Sir Edwin Smith and Lady Smith, Messrs. P. W. Conybeer and J. Darling, jun., member for the district, the mayor, aldermen, and councillors, and other leading residents. Mr. A. W. Piper, chairman of the committee, asked Lady Smith to declare the recreation ground open for public use.

== Australian rules football ==
Use of Norwood Oval for football dates back to 1901, the year of its official opening. The first game being Norwood against the newly formed Sturt Football Club on 4 May 1901.

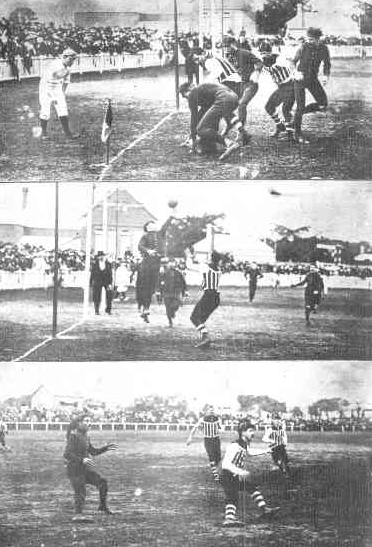
Norwood vs Port Adelaide in front of 10,000 spectators in 1906

A match between Norwood and Port Adelaide in 1906 attracted a packed out 10,000 fans. The ground record crowd was set in 1971 when 20,280 watched an SANFL match between Norwood and its traditional SANFL rivals Port Adelaide.

Norwood Oval's dimensions are 165m x 110m, making it the narrowest ground in use in the SANFL.

In the 1950s the Norwood Football Club received permission from the then City of Kensington & Norwood to install six light towers at the oval. This allowed Norwood to host not only night football matches but also night baseball. Regular night SANFL night series matches were played at the oval until 1984 when all night games were transferred to the SANFL's own Football Park when construction of light towers at that ground was completed.

In 1973, the SANFL introduced a five-team finals series for the first time and Norwood Oval holds the distinction of hosting the first SANFL elimination final when home-team Norwood defeated rivals Port Adelaide by six goals. The first semi final was also held at Norwood in 1973 when reigning premiers (and 1972 Champions of Australia North Adelaide), led by three-time Magarey Medallist Barrie Robran, defeated Norwood in a close match, bringing an end to the Redlegs 1973 season.

Norwood Oval was also the scene of Norwood's triumph over East Perth in the 1977 National Football League grand final.

Night football returned to Norwood Oval during the early 2000s and Friday-night games at the oval (mostly featuring the Redlegs, although in 2013 Sturt also used the venue for night games after previously using the Adelaide Oval) have been a regular feature of the SANFL ever since. With the popularity of Friday-night matches, other clubs installed lights at their grounds including Elizabeth Oval (Central District), Richmond Oval (West Adelaide), Hickinbotham Oval (South Adelaide) and Glenelg Oval (Glenelg). Woodville-West Torrens also played selected night games at the Thebarton Oval (the former home ground of West Torrens) after the oval's six original light towers were replaced with four modern ones by the ground's major tenant, the South Australian Amateur Football League.

The light towers were upgraded at Norwood Oval in 2010. The six light towers that had been in place since the 1950s were replaced with four light towers of television standard positioned at the "corners" of the oval.

The Adelaide Crows women's team played one game at the venue in the AFLW's inaugural 2017 season; the other two games held in Adelaide were played at Thebarton Oval. All three home games held in Adelaide during the 2018 and 2019 seasons were played at Norwood Oval. No AFLW games were held at Norwood Oval in 2020 due to the construction of the Wolf Blass Community Centre at the ground but the Crows returned to playing the majority of their games at Norwood Oval in 2021.

Since 2023, the oval hosts two senior Australian Football League matches a year as part of Gather Round with an AFL record crowd of 9,434 set on April 12, 2026 when Geelong defeated West Coast by 46 points.

== Baseball ==
Norwood has also hosted Baseball since 1951 with the South Australian Baseball team being tenants until 1988. Between 1951 and 1988 Norwood Oval hosted the Claxton Shield competition on six occasions (1951, 1956, 1961, 1966, 1971, 1976 and 1981) with the winners being NSW (1951), Victoria (1956 and 1981) and SA (1961, `66, `71 and `76).

The original Australian Baseball League (ABL) started in 1989 with Adelaide represented by the Adelaide Giants. The ABL ran from 1989 until it folded in 1999 with the Giants playing all of their home games at Norwood Oval with most being under lights. During their time in the ABL the Giants were affiliated, as were every other team in the league, with a team from Major League Baseball. In a massive coup the Giants managed to get themselves affiliated with the 1988 World Series champions the Los Angeles Dodgers with the team receiving 3-4 'import players' a season from the Dodgers Minor League system to complement their array of 'local' talent. During the ABL the Giants never made the ABL's championship series.

Following the collapse of the ABL after 1999 and the short lived International Baseball League of Australia (IBLA) which ran from 1999-2000 until the 2002 the Claxton Shield was revived in 2003 with South Australia playing their games at the Thebarton Oval before moving back to Norwood Oval in 2009.

In August 2010 it was announced that there would be a new Australian Baseball League and that Norwood Oval would be the home ground of Adelaide Bite, the team representing Adelaide in the ABL.

Prior to 2009, the baseball diamond at Norwood Oval was located closer to the Wood Street stand. The third base line ran almost parallel to the stand, with the first base line running east towards the outer side of the ground. The diamond was then moved to its present position in 2009.

As of February 2012 Norwood Oval's field dimensions for baseball are:

Left Field - 320 feet (98 m)
Centre Field - 390 feet (120 m)
Right Field - 290 feet (88 m)
