= 1965 Claxton Shield =

- 1965

Tournament information
- Host(s): New South Wales (Sydney)
- Teams: 5
- Defending champions: South Australia

Final positions
- Champion: Victoria (8th title)

The 1965 Claxton Shield was the 26th annual Claxton Shield, it was held in Sydney. The participants were South Australia, New South Wales, Victoria, Western Australia and Queensland. Victoria won their 8th Claxton Shield title in poor weather conditions similar to that of the 1964 Shield.
