= 1953 Claxton Shield =

1953 Claxton Shield Champions

New South Wales
7th title

The 1953 Claxton Shield was the 14th annual Claxton Shield, a major Australian baseball tournament. It was held at the Brisbane Exhibition Ground and Davies Park in Brisbane, Queensland from 11 to 19 July 1953. It was the first Claxton Shield held in Queensland. The participants were South Australia, New South Wales, Victoria and Queensland. The Western Australia team, holders of the Shield, were unable to afford the costs to travel to Brisbane. The series was won by New South Wales, their seventh Shield title.
