= 1960 Claxton Shield =

21st annual Claxton Shield held in Sydney

1960 Claxton Shield Champions

South Australia
6th title

The 1960 Claxton Shield was the 21st annual Claxton Shield, it was held in Sydney, New South Wales. The participants were South Australia, New South Wales, Victoria, Western Australia and Queensland. The series was won by South Australia, claiming their sixth Shield title.
