= 1958 Claxton Shield =

1958 Claxton Shield Champions

Victoria
6th title

The 1958 Claxton Shield was the 19th annual Claxton Shield, and was held in Brisbane. The participants were South Australia, New South Wales, Victoria, Western Australia and Queensland. The series was won by Victoria claiming their sixth Shield title.
