= 1954 Claxton Shield =

1954 Claxton Shield Champions

Victoria
4th title

The 1954 Claxton Shield was the 15th annual Claxton Shield, and was held in Melbourne. The participants were South Australia, New South Wales, Victoria, Western Australia and Queensland. The series was won by Victoria, defeating previous champions New South Wales 6–5, claiming their fourth Shield title.
