= 1959 Claxton Shield =

1959 Claxton Shield Champions

South Australia
6th title

The 1959 Claxton Shield was the 20th annual Claxton Shield, it was held in Melbourne, Victoria. It was originally scheduled for Perth, Western Australia, but when teams hinted at pulling out of the Shield that year due to travel costs, the venue was moved. The participants were South Australia, New South Wales, Victoria, Western Australia and Queensland. The series was won by South Australia, claiming their fifth Shield title.
