= 1977 Claxton Shield =

Australia Championship Series
- 1977

Tournament information
- Date: 14 – 23 January
- Host(s): (Western Australia) Perth, WA
- Teams: 5
- Defending champions: South Australia

Final positions
- Champion: Western Australia (3rd title)
- 1st runner-up: Victoria
- 2nd runner-up: New South Wales

The 1977 Claxton Shield was the 38th annual Claxton Shield, an Australian national baseball tournament. It was held in Perth from 14 to 23 January, the eighth time Perth had hosted the Shield. Hosts Western Australia won the Shield for the third time. The other participating teams were New South Wales, Queensland, South Australia and Victoria.

== Format ==
The five teams played a double round-robin schedule, meeting each other team twice, with two competition points on offer in each game. The points were awarded as follows:

- Win – two points
- Tie – one point
- Loss – no points

After each team has played their eight games, the team with the most points was declared the champions. In the event of a tie between teams in terms of points, the tiebreaker used would have been the net runs for and against, with the team achieving the greater value placing in the higher position.

== Results ==
| Team | Points | Wins | Losses | For-Against |
|---|---|---|---|---|
| Western Australia | 12 | 6 | 2 | +29 |
| Victoria | 10 | 5 | 3 | +23 |
| New South Wales | 8 | 4 | 4 | -5 |
| Queensland | 6 | 3 | 5 | -27 |
| South Australia | 4 | 2 | 6 | -20 |

| 14 January 1977 | Western Australia | 3 – 2 | Queensland | (Western Australia) Perth, WA |

| 14 January 1977 | Victoria | 3 – 4 | New South Wales | (Western Australia) Perth, WA |

| 15 January 1977 | Queensland | 7 – 5 | New South Wales | (Western Australia) Perth, WA |

| 15 January 1977 | South Australia | 3 – 16 | Victoria | (Western Australia) Perth, WA |

| 16 January 1977 | South Australia | 4 – 3 | Queensland | (Western Australia) Perth, WA |

| 16 January 1977 | Western Australia | 2 – 1 | New South Wales | (Western Australia) Perth, WA |

| 17 January 1977 | Western Australia | 8 – 7 | South Australia | (Western Australia) Perth, WA |

| 17 January 1977 | Victoria | 14 – 7 | Queensland | (Western Australia) Perth, WA |

| 18 January 1977 | Western Australia | 4 – 5 | Victoria | (Western Australia) Perth, WA |

| 18 January 1977 | New South Wales | 3 – 1 | South Australia | (Western Australia) Perth, WA |

| 19 January 1977 | New South Wales | 8 – 7 (F/10) | Victoria | (Western Australia) Perth, WA |

| 19 January 1977 | Queensland | 4 – 20 | Western Australia | (Western Australia) Perth, WA |

| 20 January 1977 | Victoria | 2 – 0 | South Australia | (Western Australia) Perth, WA |

| 20 January 1977 | New South Wales | 8 – 13 (F/10) | Queensland | (Western Australia) Perth, WA |

| 21 January 1977 | New South Wales | 4 – 8 | Western Australia | (Western Australia) Perth, WA |

| 21 January 1977 | Queensland | 10 – 9 | South Australia | (Western Australia) Perth, WA |

| 22 January 1977 | Queensland | 7 – 17 | Victoria | (Western Australia) Perth, WA |

| 22 January 1977 | South Australia | 10 – 9 | Western Australia | (Western Australia) Perth, WA |

| 23 January 1977 | South Australia | 2 – 5 | New South Wales | (Western Australia) Perth, WA |

| 23 January 1977 | Victoria | 1 – 9 | Western Australia | (Western Australia) Perth, WA |

1977 Claxton Shield Champions

Western Australia
3rd title

== Bibliography ==
- Clark, Joe (2003). A History of Australian Baseball: Time and Game. Lincoln, NE, United States: University of Nebraska Press. ISBN 0-8032-6440-2.
