= 1957 Claxton Shield =

1957 Claxton Shield Champions

South Australia
4th title

The 1957 Claxton Shield was the 18th annual Claxton Shield, it was held in Perth, Western Australia. The participants were South Australia, New South Wales, Victoria and Western Australia. The winners were the South Australian team, who won their first title since the 1936 Claxton Shield. The year marked the centenary celebrations for baseball in Victoria.
