= 1952 Claxton Shield =

1952 Claxton Shield Champions

Western Australia
1st title

The 1952 Claxton Shield was the 13th annual Claxton Shield, it was held in Perth, Western Australia. The participants were South Australia, New South Wales, Victoria and Western Australia. The series was won by the home team, Western Australia.
