= 1961 Claxton Shield =

1961 Claxton Shield Champions

South Australia
7th title

The 1961 Claxton Shield was the 22nd annual Claxton Shield, it was held at Norwood Oval in Adelaide, South Australia. The participants were South Australia, New South Wales, Victoria, Western Australia and Queensland. The series was won by the home team South Australia, claiming their seventh and third consecutive Shield title.
