= 1951 Claxton Shield =

1951 Claxton Shield Champions

New South Wales
6th title

The 1951 Claxton Shield was the 12th annual Claxton Shield, and was held in Adelaide from 28 July to 4 August. The participants were hosts South Australia, defending champions New South Wales, Victoria, Western Australia and Queensland. The series was won by an undefeated New South Wales, their sixth Shield title.

== Results ==
28 July	Queensland	0 – 5	New South Wales

South Australia	6 – 0	Victoria

30 July	South Australia	3 – 0	Western Australia

Queensland	4 – 2	Victoria

31 July	Queensland	0 – 3	South Australia

New South Wales	3 – 1	Western Australia

2 August	Queensland	0 – 9	Western Australia

New South Wales	4 – 0	Victoria

4 August	Victoria	10 – 3	Western Australia

New South Wales	6 – 1	South Australia
