= 1949 Claxton Shield =

10th annual Claxton Shield

1949 Australian Championship Series
- 1949

Tournament information
- Date: 31 July – 7 August
- Host(s): (Victoria (state)) Melbourne, VIC
- Teams: 4
- Defending champions: (Victoria (state)) Victoria

Final positions
- Champion: Victoria (3rd title)
- 1st runner-up: New South Wales
- 2nd runner-up: South Australia

The 1949 Claxton Shield (at the time known as the 1949 Australian Championship Series) was the tenth annual Claxton Shield, an Australian national baseball tournament. It was held in Melbourne, Victoria from 31 July to 7 August, and was won by Victoria for the third time overall, all in successive years. The other participants were South Australia, New South Wales and Western Australia.

== Format ==
The 1949 edition of the Claxton Shield saw a new format introduced. Each of the four teams played a double round-robin schedule, meeting each other team twice. This ensured that each team would be guaranteed to play six games during the tournament. Two competition points were on offer in each game, with the points were awarded as follows:

- Win – two points
- Tie – one point
- Loss – no points

At the end of the round-robin games, if a team had an outright lead over all other teams, they would be declared the champions. If two teams were tied for the lead, they would then play in a championship game on the final day. If the championship game was not required, an Australian team would have been named after the round-robin games to play The Rest as an alternative, however given weather constraints this game was not played.

== Bibliography ==
- Clark, Joe (2003). A History of Australian Baseball: Time and Game. Lincoln, NE, United States: University of Nebraska Press. ISBN 0-8032-6440-2.
