= David Mundy (baseball) =

Australian cricketer (born 1947)

Personal information
- Full name: David Lloyd Mundy
- Born: 30 June 1947 (age 79); Enfield, South Australia
- Batting: Right-handed
- Bowling: Right arm medium

Domestic team information
- Years: Team
- 1969/70: South Australia

Career statistics
Competition	FC
Matches	2
Runs scored	52
Batting average	17.33
100s/50s	0/0
Top score	35*
Balls bowled
Wickets	1
Bowling average	166.00
5 wickets in innings	0
10 wickets in match	0
Best bowling	1/56
Catches/stumpings	1/–
- Source: Cricinfo, 23 August 2020

David Lloyd Mundy (born 30 June 1947) is an Australian baseballer and cricketer who was an inaugural inductee to the Baseball Australia Hall of Fame in 2005.

== Baseball career ==
Mundy played for South Australia in the Claxton Shield from 1965 to 1981. He also represented Australia at a national level from 1966 to 1979, highlighted by a bronze medal at the 1975 Asian Baseball Championship.

== Cricket career ==
Mundy also played in two first-class matches for South Australia in 1969/70.

== See also ==
- List of South Australian representative cricketers
