= 2024 AdFL season =

2024 premiership season
- Date: 13 April - 21 September
- Premiers: Division 1: Port District; Division 2: Rostrevor O.C. Division 3: Henley; Division 4: Kilburn; Division 5: Mitcham; Division 6: Eastern Park; Division 7: Para Hills

The 2024 AdFL season was the 106th season of the Adelaide Footy League (AdFL). The season commenced on 13 April and concluded on 21 September.

At the start of the season, the SA Football Commission ratified penalties for Gaza over 223 counts of salary breaches from 2018 to 2022. The breaches involved player payments, total player match payment and sign-on breaches, as well as false contracts during the 2018, 2019, 2021 and 2022 seasons. The former president, Don Rosella, was also found guilty of involvement in these breaches. The Independent Salary Cap Commissioner, Michael David KC, handed the penalties to the club, which included a $186,000 fine and deduction of six premiership points and player points, as well as a five-year suspension from holding an official role with any SANFL-affiliated club for Rosella.

West Croydon were docked 8 premiership points across all grades under the league's Behaviour Rating System after receiving five suspensions. The suspensions ranged from striking to misconduct and umpire abuse. The club's A Grade were winless prior to the punishment, while the B Grade went from fifth to eighth.

In Division 6, Elizabeth had two of their worst losses, including being on the losing end of the highest team score to date. Being beaten by Fitzroy on 4th May, 82 goals 24 behinds (516 points) to 0. As well as being beaten by Eastern Park on 13th April, 47 goals 17 behinds (347 points) to 1 goal 1 behind (7 points). They were also beaten in round two by 254 points against St. Paul's OS.

Henley won the Club Championship Cup with 32.7 points.

== Team Changes ==
Division	Promoted to Division	Relegated to Division
Division 1	Golden Grove, Payneham Norwood Union	N/A
Division 2	Flinders Park, Modbury	Goodwood Saints, Old Ignatians
Division 3	Lockleys, CBC OC	Henley, North Haven
Division 4	Gepps Cross, Kilburn	Gaza, Westminster OS
Division 5	Greenacres, Marion	Mitcham, Portland
Division 6	Ingle Farm, Salisbury	Eastern Park, Elizabeth
Division 7	N/A	Brahma Lodge, Smithfield

== Men's Division 1 ==
Brighton, Broadview, Glenunga, Golden Grove, Payneham Norwood Union, Port District, Prince Alfred OC, Sacred Heart OC, St Peter’s OC, Tea Tree Gully

=== Seniors ===
==== Ladder ====
Pos	Team	Pld	W	L	D	PF	PA	PP	Pts
1	Glenunga	18	17	1	0	1730	1040	62.45	34
2	Sacred Heart OC	18	13	5	0	1153	950	54.82	26
3	Port District	18	11	6	1	1474	1148	56.21	23
4	Golden Grove	18	10	8	0	1394	1323	51.30	20
5	Payneham NU	18	9	9	0	1293	1395	48.10	18
6	Prince Alfred OC	18	7	11	0	1107	1509	42.31	14
7	Broadview	18	6	12	0	1183	1398	45.83	12
8	St Peters OC	18	6	12	0	1154	1376	45.61	12
9	Brighton Bombers	18	5	12	1	1149	1353	45.92	11
10	Tea Tree Gully	18	5	13	0	1257	1402	47.27	10

source:PlayHQ

==== Finals ====
===== Week 1 =====
	Elimination and Qualifying Finals
Saturday, 31 August (2:15pm)	Sacred Heart OC 7.6	def. by	Port District 9.10 (64)	Sacred Heart Senior School Oval	Report
Saturday, 31 August (2:30pm)	Golden Grove 7.15 (57)	def. by	Payneham NU 8.14 (62)	Harpers Field	Report

===== Semi Finals =====
	Semi Finals
Saturday, 7 September (2:00pm)	Glenunga 16.10 (106)	def.	Port District 4.8 (32)	Webb Oval	Report
Saturday, 7 September (2:00pm)	Sacred Heart OC 9.7 (61)	def. by	Payneham NU 12.8 (80)	Sacred Heart Senior School Oval	Report

===== Preliminary Final =====
	Preliminary Final
Saturday, 14 September (2:15pm)	Port District 13.14 (92)	def.	Payneham NU 8.8 (56)	Campbelltown Memorial Oval	Report

===== Grand Final =====
Grand Final
Saturday, 21 September (2:30pm)	Glenunga	def. by	Port District	Norwood Oval	Report
3.2 (20); 4.5 (29); 5.7 (37); 6.8 (44)	Q1; Q2; Q3; Final	1.3 (9); 4.4 (28); 8.5 (53); 9.10 (64)	Umpires: Field – Andrew Crosby, Paul Smitheram; Boundary – Anthony Brattoli, Peter McMullen, Michael Pollnitz, Andrew Roberts; Goal – Steve Martin, Jason Rigg; BoG Medal: Mitchell Gaffney, Port District

=== Reserves ===
==== Ladder ====
Pos	Team	Pld	W	L	D	PF	PA	PP	Pts
1	Sacred Heart OC	18	14	3	1	1244	746	62.51	29
2	Glenunga	18	14	3	1	1170	834	58.38	29
3	Golden Grove	18	13	5	0	1156	846	57.74	26
4	Broadview	18	11	7	0	1184	881	57.33	22
5	Port District	18	11	7	0	1250	944	56.97	22
6	Payneham NU	18	10	8	0	1007	1072	48.43	20
7	Prince Alfred OC	18	8	10	0	1042	961	52.02	16
8	Tea Tree Gully	18	5	12	1	855	1043	45.04	11
9	St Peters OC	18	2	15	1	675	1467	31.51	5
10	Brighton Bombers	18	0	18	0	631	1420	30.76	0

source:PlayHQ

==== Finals ====
===== Week 1 =====
	Elimination and Qualifying Finals
Saturday, 31 August (12:15pm)	Broadview 7.10 (52)	def. by	Port District 9.12 (66)	Sacred Heart Senior School Oval	Report
Saturday, 31 August (12:30pm)	Glenunga 14.5 (89)	def.	Golden Grove 6.7 (43)	Harpers Field	Report

===== Semi Finals =====
	Semi Finals
Saturday, 7 September (11:00am)	Golden Grove 11.9 (75)	def. by	Port District 12.11 (83)	Harpers Field	Report
Saturday, 7 September (12:00pm)	Sacred Heart OC 11.10 (76)	def.	Glenunga 5.8 (38)	Webb Oval	Report

===== Preliminary Final =====
	Preliminary Final
Saturday, 14 September (12:15pm)	Glenunga 10.10 (70)	def.	Port District 5.6 (36)	Campbelltown Memorial Oval	Report

===== Grand Final =====
Grand Final
Saturday, 21 September (12:15pm)	Sacred Heart OC	def.	Glenunga	Norwood Oval	Report
0.4 (4); 2.7 (19); 5.8 (38); 8.12 (60)	Q1; Q2; Q3; Final	1.2 (8); 2.7 (19); 4.9 (33); 5.11 (41)	Umpires: Field – Cameron MacLeod, Pat Noonan; Boundary – Tristan Rogers, Wayne Steer; Goal – John Biggs, Annette Greenshields; BoG Medal: Lachlan Hartshorne, Sacred Heart OC

== Men's Division 2 ==
Adelaide University, Athelstone, Edwardstown, Flinders Park, Goodwood, Modbury, Old Ignatians, PHOS Camden, Rostrevor OC, Salisbury North

=== Seniors ===
==== Ladder ====
Pos	Team	Pld	W	L	D	PF	PA	PP	Pts
1	Salisbury North	18	16	2	0	1617	1062	60.35	32
2	Rostrevor OC	18	15	3	0	1563	914	63.10	30
3	Athelstone	18	12	6	0	1529	1177	56.50	24
4	Modbury	18	10	8	0	1439	1219	54.13	20
5	Flinders Park	18	10	8	0	1308	1174	52.69	20
6	Goodwood Saints	18	8	10	0	1133	1226	48.02	16
7	Adelaide University	18	7	11	0	1121	1449	43.61	14
8	Old Ignatians	18	6	12	0	1173	1196	49.51	12
9	PHOS Camden	18	6	12	0	1013	1356	42.76	12
10	Edwardstown	18	0	18	0	850	1973	30.10	0

source:PlayHQ

==== Finals ====
===== Week 1 =====
	Elimination and Qualifying Finals
Saturday, 24 August (2:15pm)	Rostrevor OC 8.12 (60)	def.	Athelstone 6.14 (50)	Campbelltown Memorial Oval	Report
Saturday, 24 August (2:15pm)	Modbury 10.7 (67)	def. by	Flinders Park 14.10 (94)	Modbury Oval	Report

===== Semi Finals =====
	Semi Finals
Saturday, 31 August (2:15pm)	Salisbury North 12.11 (83)	def.	Rostrevor OC 6.14 (50)	Salisbury North Oval	Report
Saturday, 31 August (2:15pm)	Athelstone 13.13 (91)	def.	Flinders Park 5.10 (40)	Max Amber Sportsfield	Report

===== Preliminary Final =====
	Preliminary Final
Saturday, 7 September (2:30pm)	Rostrevor OC 8.12 (60)	def.	Athelstone 6.8 (44)	Elizabeth Oval	Report

===== Grand Final =====
Grand Final
Saturday, 14 September (2:30pm)	Salisbury North	def. by	Rostrevor OC	Norwood Oval	Report
3.4 (22); 4.8 (32); 4.11 (35); 7.13 (55)	Q1; Q2; Q3; Final	3.0 (18); 6.2 (38); 9.4 (58); 10.6 (66)	Umpires: Field – Stefan Cederblad, Matt Harris; Boundary – Daniel Milne, Guido Porcaro, Jake Smith, James Underwood; Goal – Chris May, Robert Tainsh; BoG Medal: James Wharton, Rostrevor OC

=== Reserves ===
==== Ladder ====
Pos	Team	Pld	W	L	D	PF	PA	PP	Pts
1	Goodwood Saints	18	17	1	0	1723	586	74.62	34
2	Rostrevor OC	18	15	3	0	1557	713	68.59	30
3	Salisbury North	18	12	5	1	1160	911	56.01	25
4	Flinders Park	18	10	8	0	1000	979	50.53	20
5	Old Ignatians	18	9	8	1	1075	1125	48.86	19
6	PHOS Camden	18	7	10	1	1100	1170	48.45	15
7	Athelstone	18	6	11	1	969	1214	44.38	13
8	Modbury	18	6	12	0	960	1019	48.50	12
9	Adelaide University	18	3	15	0	673	1566	30.05	6
10	Edwardstown	18	3	15	0	692	1626	29.85	6

source:PlayHQ

==== Finals ====
===== Week 1 =====
	Elimination and Qualifying Finals
Saturday, 24 August (12:15pm)	Rostrevor OC 11.11 (77)	def.	Salisbury North 8.5 (53)	Campbelltown Memorial Oval	Report
Saturday, 24 August (12:15pm)	Flinders Park 6.13 (49)	def.	Old Ignatians 6.12 (48)	Modbury Oval	Report

===== Semi Finals =====
	Semi Finals
Saturday, 31 August (12:15pm)	Goodwood Saints 8.4 (52)	def.	Rostrevor OC 4.6 (30)	Max Amber Sportsfield	Report
Saturday, 31 August (12:15pm)	Salisbury North 7.8 (50)	def. by	Flinders Park 8.6 (54)	Salisbury North Oval	Report

===== Preliminary Final =====
	Preliminary Final
Saturday, 7 September (12:30pm)	Rostrevor OC 11.6 (72)	def. by	Flinders Park 12.7 (79)	Elizabeth Oval	Report

===== Grand Final =====
Grand Final
Saturday, 14 September (12:15pm)	Goodwood Saints	def.	Flinders Park	Norwood Oval	Report
5.2 (32); 7.3 (45); 9.10 (64); 9.12 (66)	Q1; Q2; Q3; Final	1.1 (7); 4.1 (25); 4.1 (25); 8.5 (53)	Umpires: Field – Liam Binning, Chris Lambert; Boundary – Lachlan Price, Tristan Rogers; Goal – Riley Jensen, Ian MacGregor; BoG Medal: Hamish Burns, Goodwood Saints

== Men's Division 3 ==
CBC OC, Henley, Hope Valley, Lockleys, North Haven, Pembroke OS, SMOSH West Lakes, Scotch OC, Seaton Ramblers, Unley Mercedes Jets

=== Seniors ===
==== Ladder ====
Pos	Team	Pld	W	L	D	PF	PA	PP	Pts
1	Henley	18	16	2	0	2096	929	69.28	32
2	Lockleys	18	15	3	0	1787	1173	60.37	30
3	Unley Mercedes Jets	18	13	5	0	1689	1154	59.40	26
4	North Haven	18	13	5	0	1666	1287	56.41	26
5	Pembroke OS	18	8	9	1	1319	1195	52.46	17
6	Seaton Ramblers	18	8	9	1	1362	1332	50.55	17
7	Hope Valley	18	8	9	1	1434	1579	47.59	17
8	Scotch OC	18	4	14	0	868	1601	35.15	8
9	CBC OC	18	3	14	1	1270	1437	46.91	7
10	SMOSH West Lakes	18	0	18	0	625	2429	20.46	0

source:PlayHQ

==== Finals ====
===== Week 1 =====
	Elimination and Qualifying Finals
Saturday, 24 August (2:15pm)	Lockleys 10.11 (71)	def. by	Unley Mercedes Jets 13.11 (89)	Lockleys Oval	Report
Saturday, 24 August (2:15pm)	North Haven 11.10 (76)	def. by	Pembroke OS 15.5 (95)	Largs North Reserve	Report

===== Semi Finals =====
	Semi Finals
Saturday, 31 August (2:00pm)	Lockleys 18.7 (115)	def.	Pembroke OS 8.4 (52)	Lockleys Oval	Report
Saturday, 31 August (2:30pm)	Henley 17.5 (107)	def.	Unley Mercedes Jets 12.7 (79)	Henley Memorial Oval	Report

===== Preliminary Final =====
	Preliminary Final
Saturday, 7 September (2:15pm)	Unley Mercedes Jets 5.11 (41)	def. by	Lockleys 8.7 (55)	Richmond Oval	Report

===== Grand Final =====
Grand Final
Saturday, 14 September (2:30pm)	Henley	def.	Lockleys	Woodville Oval	Report
3.2 (20); 3.6 (24); 13.8 (86); 15.9 (99)	Q1; Q2; Q3; Final	0.3 (3); 0.5 (5); 2.5 (17); 7.8 (50)	Umpires: Field – Jason Hayes, Frank Manikas; Boundary – Nathan D’Souza, Alex Whicker; Goal – Chris Adey, Jonathan Owen; BoG Medal: Jack Enright, Henley

=== Reserves ===
==== Ladder ====
Pos	Team	Pld	W	L	D	PF	PA	PP	Pts
1	Henley	18	18	0	0	2510	293	89.54	36
2	Lockleys	18	15	3	0	1474	816	64.36	30
3	Unley Mercedes Jets	18	11	7	0	1346	923	59.32	22
4	North Haven	18	11	7	0	1095	899	54.91	22
5	Hope Valley	18	10	8	0	1322	1071	55.24	20
6	Seaton Ramblers	18	9	9	0	1068	1030	50.90	18
7	Pembroke OS	18	8	10	0	1145	1209	48.64	16
8	Scotch OC	18	4	14	0	724	1552	31.81	8
9	CBC OC	18	4	14	0	699	1778	28.21	8
10	SMOSH West Lakes	18	0	18	0	435	2247	16.21	0

source:PlayHQ

==== Finals ====
===== Week 1 =====
	Elimination and Qualifying Finals
Saturday, 24 August (12:15pm)	Lockleys 7.11 (53)	def. by	Unley Mercedes Jets 7.13 (55)	Lockleys Oval	Report
Saturday, 24 August (12:15pm)	North Haven 11.2 (68)	def.	Hope Valley 6.10 (46)	Largs North Reserve	Report

===== Semi Finals =====
	Semi Finals
Saturday, 31 August (12:00pm)	Lockleys 13.13 (91)	def.	North Haven 4.4 (28)	Lockleys Oval	Report
Saturday, 31 August (12:30pm)	Henley 18.15 (123)	def.	Unley Mercedes Jets 5.2 (32)	Henley Memorial Oval	Report

===== Preliminary Final =====
	Preliminary Final
Saturday, 7 September (12:15pm)	Unley Mercedes Jets 9.10 (64)	def. by	Lockleys 12.4 (76)	Richmond Oval	Report

===== Grand Final =====
Grand Final
Saturday, 14 September (12:15pm)	Henley	def.	Lockleys	Woodville Oval	Report
4.0 (24); 7.5 (47); 10.8 (68); 16.12 (108)	Q1; Q2; Q3; Final	1.0 (6); 1.0 (6); 2.0 (12); 2.0 (12)	Umpires: Field – Iggy Mareolas, Tony Symons; Boundary – Lewis Hogben, Alexander Leo; Goal – Ron Kennealy, Warren Williams; BoG Medal: Jordan Hodges, Henley

== Men's Division 4 ==
Gaza, Gepps Cross, Hectorville, Kenilworth, Kilburn, Morphettville Park, Plympton, Pooraka, Walkerville, Westminster OS

=== Seniors ===
==== Ladder ====
Pos	Team	Pld	W	L	D	PF	PA	PP	Pts
1	Plympton	18	14	3	1	2053	923	68.98	29
2	Westminster OS	18	14	4	0	1748	917	65.59	28
3	Kilburn	18	14	4	0	1801	1083	62.44	28
4	Morphettville Park	18	12	6	0	1519	1150	56.91	24
5	Hectorville	18	10	7	1	1613	1055	60.45	21
6	Kenilworth	18	9	9	0	1354	1290	51.21	18
7	Walkerville	18	7	11	0	1342	1472	47.69	14
8	Gepps Cross	18	5	13	0	1488	1551	48.96	10
9	Pooraka	18	4	14	0	1149	1967	36.87	8
10	Gaza	18	0	18	0	460	3119	12.85	-6

source:PlayHQ

==== Finals ====
===== Week 1 =====
	Elimination and Qualifying Finals
Saturday, 24 August (2:00pm)	Westminster OS 15.13 (103)	def. by	Kilburn 16.12 (108)	Glandore Oval Reserve	Report
Saturday, 24 August (2:30pm)	Morphettville Park 11.13 (79)	def.	Hectorville 8.12 (60)	Kellett Reserve Oval	Report

===== Semi Finals =====
	Semi Finals
Saturday, 31 August (2:00pm)	Westminster OS 13.9 (87)	def.	Morphettville Park 11.4 (70)	Glandore Oval Reserve	Report
Saturday, 31 August (2:30pm)	Plympton 9.12 (66)	def. by	Kilburn 11.13 (79)	Plympton Oval	Report

===== Preliminary Final =====
	Preliminary Final
Saturday, 7 September (2:15pm)	Plympton 8.6 (54)	def. by	Westminster OS 12.13 (85)	Woodville Oval	Report

===== Grand Final =====
Grand Final
Saturday, 14 September (2:30pm)	Kilburn	def.	Westminster OS	Richmond Oval	Report
5.1 (31); 6.4 (40); 10.5 (65); 15.11 (101)	Q1; Q2; Q3; Final	1.6 (12); 2.7 (19); 2.8 (20); 3.9 (27)	Umpires: Field – Marek Carls, Nathan May; Boundary – Xavier Allen, Michael Duffett; Goal – Robert Errigo, Daniel Harrold; BoG Medal: Brayden Lauder, Kilburn

=== Reserves ===
==== Ladder ====
Pos	Team	Pld	W	L	D	Forf	PF	PA	PP	Pts
1	Plympton	16	14	1	1	0	1455	509	74.08	29
2	Walkerville	16	11	4	1	0	1178	737	61.51	23
3	Kilburn	16	11	5	0	0	1240	933	57.06	22
4	Kenilworth	16	8	8	0	0	1199	870	57.95	16
5	Hectorville	16	8	8	0	0	956	788	54.81	16
6	Morphettville Park	16	7	9	0	0	1072	1069	50.07	14
7	Westminster OS	16	6	10	0	0	1123	847	57.00	12
8	Gepps Cross	16	6	10	0	0	950	895	51.49	12
9	Pooraka	16	0	15	0	1	133	2658	4.76	0

source:PlayHQ

==== Finals ====
===== Week 1 =====
	Elimination and Qualifying Finals
Saturday, 24 August (12:00pm)	Walkerville 13.14 (92)	def.	Kilburn 6.4 (40)	Glandore Oval Reserve	Report
Saturday, 24 August (12:30pm)	Kenilworth 16.15 (111)	def.	Hectorville 4.9 (33)	Kellett Reserve Oval	Report

===== Semi Finals =====
	Semi Finals
Saturday, 31 August (12:00pm)	Kilburn 11.8 (74)	def.	Kenilworth 5.8 (38)	Glandore Oval Reserve	Report
Saturday, 31 August (12:30pm)	Plympton 4.10 (34)	def. by	Walkerville 6.4 (40)	Plympton Oval	Report

===== Preliminary Final =====
	Preliminary Final
Saturday, 7 September (12:15pm)	Plympton 8.7 (55)	def.	Kilburn 5.5 (35)	Woodville Oval	Report

===== Grand Final =====
Grand Final
Saturday, 14 September (12:15pm)	Walkerville	def. by	Plympton	Richmond Oval	Report
2.0 (12); 6.2 (38); 7.2 (44); 7.2 (44)	Q1; Q2; Q3; Final	1.3 (9); 3.4 (22); 4.4 (28); 7.8 (50)	Umpires: Field – Mark Braunack, Greg Symons; Boundary – Owen Chilman, James Hutchins; Goal – Lindsay Holst, Stewart Hood; BoG Medal: Johnny Pegorano, Plympton

== Men's Division 5 ==
Blackfriars OS, Colonel Light Gardens, Greenacres, Marion, Mitcham, Portland, Pulteney, Trinity OS, West Croydon, Woodville South

=== Seniors ===
==== Ladder ====
Pos	Team	Pld	W	L	D	Forf	PF	PA	PP	Pts
1	Mitcham	18	16	2	0	0	1927	995	65.94	32
2	Colonel Light Gardens	18	16	2	0	0	1909	1104	63.35	32
3	Marion	18	12	6	0	0	1901	1024	64.99	24
4	Greenacres	18	12	6	0	0	1558	1307	54.38	24
5	Pulteney	18	9	9	0	0	1653	1326	55.48	18
6	Woodville South	18	9	9	0	0	1577	1348	53.91	18
7	Trinity OS	18	7	11	0	0	1165	1484	43.97	14
8	Portland	18	6	12	0	0	1682	1662	50.29	12
9	Blackfriars OS	18	3	15	0	0	1163	2013	36.61	6
10	West Croydon	18	0	16	0	2	535	2807	16.00	-8

source:PlayHQ

==== Finals ====
===== Week 1 =====
	Elimination and Qualifying Finals
Saturday, 24 August (2:15pm)	Greenacres 11.11 (77)	def.	Pulteney 11.10 (76)	LJ Lewis Reserve	Report
Saturday, 24 August (2:30pm)	Colonel Light Gardens 14.8 (92)	def.	Marion 13.11 (89)	Mortlock Park	Report

===== Semi Finals =====
	Semi Finals
Saturday, 31 August (2:00pm)	Marion 16.15 (111)	def.	Greenacres 9.11 (65)	Marion Oval	Report
Saturday, 31 August (2:30pm)	Mitcham 11.13 (79)	def.	Colonel Light Gardens 3.10 (28)	Price Memorial Oval	Report

===== Preliminary Final =====
	Preliminary Final
Saturday, 7 September (2:15pm)	Colonel Light Gardens 11.10 (76)	def.	Marion 8.7 (55)	St Marys Park	Report

===== Grand Final =====
Grand Final
Saturday, 14 September (2:30pm)	Mitcham	def.	Colonel Light Gardens	Payneham Oval	Report
6.2 (38); 7.4 (46); 11.8 (74); 18.12 (120)	Q1; Q2; Q3; Final	0.1 (1); 4.3 (27); 6.6 (42); 8.7 (55)	Umpires: Field – Dennis Cester, Michael Williamson; Boundary – Jakeb Eichler, Levi Mosley; Goal – Jason Collard, Roberto Lombardi; BoG Medal: Maxwell Smyth, Mitcham

=== Reserves ===
==== Ladder ====
Pos	Team	Pld	W	L	D	Forf	PF	PA	PP	Pts
1	Marion	18	17	1	0	0	1897	522	78.42	34
2	Woodville South	18	15	3	0	0	1890	539	77.80	30
3	Colonel Light Gardens	18	14	4	0	0	1881	563	76.96	28
4	Mitcham	18	12	6	0	0	1588	897	63.90	24
5	Greenacres	18	9	9	0	0	1201	1221	49.58	18
6	Pulteney	18	6	12	0	0	1192	1309	47.66	12
7	Trinity OS	18	6	12	0	0	1092	1409	43.66	12
8	West Croydon	18	8	8	0	2	980	1435	40.57	8
9	Blackfriars OS	18	2	15	0	1	703	2169	24.47	4
10	Portland	18	1	11	0	6	265	2625	9.16	2

source:PlayHQ

==== Finals ====
===== Week 1 =====
	Elimination and Qualifying Finals
Saturday, 24 August (12:15pm)	Mitcham 9.5 (59)	def.	Greenacres 6.8 (44)	LJ Lewis Reserve	Report
Saturday, 24 August (12:30pm)	Woodville South 9.12 (66)	def.	Colonel Light Gardens 7.8 (50)	Mortlock Park	Report

===== Semi Finals =====
	Semi Finals
Saturday, 31 August (12:00pm)	Marion 4.4 (28)	def. by	Woodville South 10.9 (69)	Marion Oval	Report
Saturday, 31 August (12:15pm)	Colonel Light Gardens 4.12 (36)	def.	Mitcham 2.9 (21)	Price Memorial Oval	Report

===== Preliminary Final =====
	Preliminary Final
Saturday, 7 September (12:15pm)	Marion 4.3 (27)	def. by	Colonel Light Gardens 16.9 (105)	St Marys Park	Report

===== Grand Final =====
Grand Final
Saturday, 14 September (12:15pm)	Woodville South	def. by	Colonel Light Gardens	Payneham Oval	Report
2.3 (15); 2.4 (16); 4.6 (30); 5.6 (36)	Q1; Q2; Q3; Final	3.2 (20); 7.3 (45); 7.5 (47); 10.7 (67)	Umpires: Field – Gavin Dew, Bill Spencer; Boundary – Leif Mosley, Hamish Pullen; Goal – Bill Begetis, Tony Crescitelli; BoG Medal: Jacob Blake Smith, Colonel Light Gardens

== Men's Division 6 ==
Adelaide Lutheran, Central United, Eastern Park, Elizabeth, Fitzroy, Houghton Districts, Ingle Farm, Rosewater, Salisbury, St Paul’s OS

=== Seniors ===
==== Ladder ====
Pos	Team	Pld	W	L	D	PF	PA	PP	Pts
1	Salisbury	18	18	0	0	2384	751	76.04	36
2	Eastern Park	18	16	2	0	2863	995	74.20	32
3	Fitzroy	18	12	6	0	2293	1143	66.73	24
4	Ingle Farm	18	12	6	0	2042	1157	63.83	24
5	St Paul's OS	18	9	9	0	1715	1711	50.05	18
6	Houghton Districts	18	8	10	0	1735	1726	50.13	16
7	Rosewater	18	8	10	0	1206	1507	44.45	16
8	Adelaide Lutheran	18	3	15	0	1139	1985	36.45	6
9	Central United	18	3	15	0	897	2428	26.97	6
10	Elizabeth	18	1	17	0	541	3412	13.68	2

source:PlayHQ

==== Finals ====
===== Week 1 =====
	Elimination and Qualifying Finals
Saturday, 24 August (2:00pm)	Eastern Park 21.15 (141)	def.	Fitzroy 10.15 (75)	Dwight Reserve	Report
Saturday, 24 August (2:30pm)	Ingle Farm 12.10 (82)	def. by	St. Paul's OS 15.13 (103)	Rowe Park	Report

===== Semi Finals =====
	Semi Finals
Saturday, 31 August (2:15pm)	Salisbury 9.10 (64)	def.	Eastern Park 9.6 (60)	Salisbury Oval	Report
Saturday, 31 August (2:15pm)	Fitzroy 13.11 (89)	def.	St. Paul's OS 5.13 (43)	Sam Johnson Sportsground	Report

===== Preliminary Final =====
	Preliminary Final
Saturday, 7 September (2:15pm)	Eastern Park 19.11 (125)	def.	Fitzroy 15.7 (97)	Campbelltown Memorial Oval	Report

===== Grand Final =====
Grand Final
Saturday, 14 September (2:30pm)	Salisbury	def. by	Eastern Park	Elizabeth Oval	Report
2.0 (12); 4.4 (28); 4.5 (29); 6.5 (41)	Q1; Q2; Q3; Final	1.3 (9); 3.3 (21); 6.4 (40); 7.10 (52)	Umpires: Field – Adam Forster, Luke Harrington; Boundary – Nathan Nigro, Harrison Zeuner; Goal – Fabian Baldwin, Grant Potter; BoG Medal: Chris Knapp, Eastern Park

=== Reserves ===
==== Ladder ====
Pos	Team	Pld	W	L	D	Forf	PF	PA	PP	Pts
1	Salisbury	18	16	1	0	0	1971	532	78.74	33
2	Eastern Park	18	16	2	0	0	1972	687	74.16	32
3	Ingle Farm	18	14	4	0	0	2130	765	73.57	28
4	Adelaide Lutheran	18	12	5	0	0	1421	843	62.76	25
5	Rosewater	18	10	8	0	0	1648	925	64.04	20
6	Houghton Districts	18	8	10	0	0	1475	1015	59.23	16
7	Fitzroy	18	6	12	0	0	1239	1594	43.73	12
8	St Paul's OS	18	5	13	0	0	1039	1695	38.00	10
9	Elizabeth	18	2	16	0	0	302	2726	9.97	4
10	Central United	18	0	16	0	2	369	2784	11.70	0

source:PlayHQ

==== Finals ====
===== Week 1 =====
	Elimination and Qualifying Finals
Saturday, 24 August (12:00pm)	Eastern Park 15.14 (104)	def.	Ingle Farm 9.2 (56)	Dwight Reserve	Report
Saturday, 24 August (12:30pm)	Adelaide Lutheran 13.13 (91)	def.	Rosewater 6.10 (46)	Rowe Park	Report

===== Semi Finals =====
	Semi Finals
Saturday, 31 August (12:15pm)	Salisbury 6.13 (49)	def.	Eastern Park 2.6 (18)	Salisbury Oval	Report
Saturday, 31 August (12:15pm)	Ingle Farm 9.4 (58)	def. by	Adelaide Lutheran 10.7 (67)	Sam Johnson Sportsground	Report

===== Preliminary Final =====
	Preliminary Final
Saturday, 7 September (12:15pm)	Eastern Park 5..5 (35)	def. by	Adelaide Lutheran 13.6 (84)	Campbelltown Memorial Oval	Report

===== Grand Final =====
Grand Final
Saturday, 14 September (12:15pm)	Salisbury	def.	Adelaide Lutheran	Elizabeth Oval	Report
0.4 (4); 4.8 (32); 6.10 (46); 11.14 (80)	Q1; Q2; Q3; Final	0.3 (3); 0.4 (4); 0.8 (8); 0.8 (8)	Umpires: Field – Matthew Jacques, Salvator Smolinski; Boundary – Noah Horner, James Roissetter; Goal – Daniel Bartlett, Phillip Devlin; BoG Medal: Corey Pryor, Salisbury

== Men's Division 7 ==
Brahma Lodge, Flinders University, Hackham, Mawson Lakes, Mitchell Park, OSB Lonsdale, Para Hills, Smithfield

=== Seniors ===
==== Ladder ====
Pos	Team	Pld	W	L	D	PF	PA	PP	Pts
1	Para Hills	17	15	2	0	2289	693	76.76	30
2	O'Sullivan Beach Lonsdale	17	15	2	0	2111	1016	67.50	30
3	Hackham	17	10	7	0	1324	1340	49.69	20
4	Flinders University	17	8	9	0	1448	1487	49.33	16
5	Brahma Lodge	17	7	9	1	1264	1527	45.28	15
6	Mawson Lakes	17	7	10	0	1414	1416	49.96	14
7	Mitchell Park	17	3	13	1	1042	1952	34.80	7
8	Smithfield	17	2	15	0	1088	2549	29.91	4

source:PlayHQ

==== Finals ====
===== Week 1 =====
	Elimination and Qualifying Finals
Saturday, 17 August (2:00pm)	O'Sullivan Beach Lonsdale 15.20 (110)	def.	Hackham 6.10 (46)	Lonsdale Oval	Report
Saturday, 17 August (2:30pm)	Flinders University 11.9 (75)	def. by	Brahma Lodge 12.11 (83)	Flinders University Oval	Report

===== Semi Finals =====
	Semi Finals
Saturday, 24 August (2:15pm)	Hackham 12.11 (83)	def.	Brahma Lodge 10.8 (68)	Hackham Oval	Report
Saturday, 24 August (2:30pm)	Para Hills 13.15 (93)	def.	O'Sullivan Beach Lonsdale 5.5 (35)	Paddocks Oval	Report

===== Preliminary Final =====
	Preliminary Final
Saturday, 31 August (2:15pm)	O'Sullivan Beach Lonsdale 11.10 (76)	def.	Hackham 9.6 (60)	St Marys Park	Report

===== Grand Final =====
Grand Final
Saturday, 7 September (3:15pm)	Para Hills	def.	O'Sullivan Beach Lonsdale	Norwood Oval	Report
2.3 (15); 4.5 (29); 9.7 (61); 11.9 (75)	Q1; Q2; Q3; Final	3.4 (22); 5.8 (38); 7.9 (51); 10.9 (69)	Umpires: Field – Joel Degilio, Chris Rasch; Boundary – Syd Cousins, Aedan Ryan; Goal – Phil Devlin, Nic Rogers; BoG Medal: Aron Asfaha, Para Hills

=== Reserves ===
==== Ladder ====
Pos	Team	Pld	W	L	D	Forf	PF	PA	PP	Pts
1	Para Hills	17	17	0	0	0	1898	381	83.28	34
2	Mawson Lakes	17	11	6	0	0	1189	818	59.24	22
3	Smithfield	17	11	6	0	0	1445	1016	58.71	22
4	O'Sullivan Beach Lonsdale	17	10	7	0	0	1124	1169	49.01	20
5	Flinders University	17	9	8	0	0	1100	1090	50.22	18
6	Brahma Lodge	17	8	9	0	0	1145	1274	47.33	16
7	Mitchell Park	17	1	15	0	1	722	1584	31.30	2
8	Hackham	17	1	16	0	0	642	1933	24.93	2

source:PlayHQ

==== Finals ====
===== Week 1 =====
	Elimination and Qualifying Finals
Saturday, 17 August (12:00pm)	O'Sullivan Beach Lonsdale 11.11 (77)	def.	Flinders University 9.4 (58)	Lonsdale Oval	Report
Saturday, 17 August (12:30pm)	Mawson Lakes 7.9 (51)	def. by	Smithfield 9.6 (60)	Flinders University Oval	Report

===== Semi Finals =====
	Semi Finals
Saturday, 24 August (12:00pm)	Mawson Lakes 6.14 (50)	def. by	O'Sullivan Beach Lonsdale 13.6 (84)	Mawson Lakes Oval	Report
Saturday, 24 August (12:30pm)	Para Hills 12.13 (85)	def.	Smithfield 8.11 (59)	Paddocks Oval	Report

===== Preliminary Final =====
	Preliminary Final
Saturday, 31 August (12:15pm)	Smithfield 11.15 (81)	def.	O'Sullivan Beach Lonsdale 8.5 (53)	St Marys Park	Report

===== Grand Final =====
Grand Final
Saturday, 7 September (1:00pm)	Para Hills	def.	Smithfield	Norwood Oval	Report
2.4 (16); 6.4 (40); 10.5 (65); 11.9 (75)	Q1; Q2; Q3; Final	2.1 (13); 3.2 (20); 4.3 (27); 5.4 (34)	Umpires: Field – Elliott Giles, Rob Middlin; Boundary – Charlie Loffler. Connor O’Driscoll; Goal – David Burness, Tony Laintoll; BoG Medal: Lachlan Sullivan, Para Hills

== C1 ==
=== Ladder ===
Pos	Team	Pld	W	L	D	Forf	PF	PA	PP	Pts
1	Prince Alfred OC	18	18	0	0	0	2065	468	81.52	36
2	Port District	18	14	4	0	0	1424	523	73.13	28
3	Sacred Heart OC	18	14	4	0	0	1519	655	69.87	28
4	Payneham NU	18	9	8	1	0	1093	1032	51.43	19
5	Broadview	18	9	9	0	0	1059	697	60.30	18
6	Golden Grove	18	9	9	0	0	1053	1113	48.61	18
7	Glenunga	18	7	11	0	0	905	1159	43.84	14
8	Tea Tree Gully	18	6	11	1	0	1051	975	51.87	13
9	St Peters OC	18	2	13	0	3	446	1970	18.46	4
10	Brighton Bombers	18	1	13	0	4	319	2342	11.98	2

source:PlayHQ

=== Finals ===
==== Week 1 ====
	Elimination and Qualifying Finals
Saturday, 31 August (10:15pm)	Port District 7.2 (44)	def. by	Sacred Heart OC 10.8 (68)	Sacred Heart Senior School Oval	Report
Saturday, 31 August (10:30pm)	Payneham NU 7.5 (47)	def. by	Broadview 10.7 (67)	Harpers Field	Report

==== Semi Finals ====
	Semi Finals
Saturday, 7 September (10:00pm)	Port District 10.14 (74)	def.	Broadview 6.6 (42)	Webb Oval	Report
Saturday, 7 September (12:00pm)	Prince Alfred OC 10.7 (67)	def. by	Sacred Heart OC 10.8 (68)	Sacred Heart Senior School Oval	Report

==== Preliminary Final ====
	Preliminary Final
Saturday, 14 September (10:15pm)	Prince Alfred OC 10.9 (69)	def.	Port District 6.8 (44)	Campbelltown Memorial Oval	Report

==== Grand Final ====
Grand Final
Saturday, 21 September (10:00am)	Sacred Heart OC	def.	Prince Alfred OC	Norwood Oval	Report
1.0 (6); 5.7 (37); 6.9 (45); 7.10 (52)	Q1; Q2; Q3; Final	3.2 (20); 3.3 (21); 4.4 (28); 5.6 (36)	Umpires: Field – Jason Mounce, Cody Rowston; Boundary – Syd Cousins, Tyler Rowston; Goal – Phil Daws, Robert Payne; BoG Medal: Hamish Dunkin, Sacred Heart OC

== C2 ==
=== Ladder ===
Pos	Team	Pld	W	L	D	Forf	PF	PA	PP	Pts
1	Modbury	18	18	0	0	0	1906	462	80.48	36
2	Goodwood Saints	18	15	3	0	0	1849	568	76.49	30
3	Rostrevor OC	18	14	4	0	0	1580	683	69.81	28
4	Athelstone	18	13	5	0	0	1448	819	63.87	26
5	Old Ignatians	18	8	10	0	0	1094	1061	50.76	16
6	Flinders Park	18	6	12	0	0	790	1488	34.67	12
7	Edwardstown	18	5	13	0	0	957	1522	38.60	10
8	Adelaide University	18	5	13	0	0	862	1441	37.42	10
9	PHOS Camden	18	5	12	0	1	736	1689	30.35	10
10	Salisbury North	18	1	17	0	0	487	1976	19.77	2

source:PlayHQ

=== Finals ===
==== Week 1 ====
	Elimination and Qualifying Finals
Saturday, 24 August (10:15am)	Goodwood Saints 16.8 (104)	def.	Rostrevor OC 7.9 (51)	Campbelltown Memorial Oval	Report
Saturday, 24 August (10:15am)	Athelstone 9.15 (69)	def.	Old Ignatians 9.8 (62)	Modbury Oval	Report

==== Semi Finals ====
	Semi Finals
Saturday, 31 August (10:15am)	Modbury 7.3 (45)	def. by	Goodwood Saints 16.5 (101)	Max Amber Sportsfield	Report
Saturday, 31 August (10:15am)	Rostrevor OC 7.6 (48)	def. by	Athelstone 11.4 (70)	Salisbury North Oval	Report

==== Preliminary Final ====
	Preliminary Final
Saturday, 7 September (10:30am)	Modbury 10.10 (70)	def.	Athelstone 3.7 (25)	Elizabeth Oval	Report

==== Grand Final ====
Grand Final
Saturday, 14 September (10:00am)	Goodwood Saints	def.	Modbury	Norwood Oval	Report
3.2 (20); 8.5 (53); 11.10 (76); 15.13 (103)	Q1; Q2; Q3; Final	1.2 (8); 1.3 (9); 3.3 (21); 6.8 (44)	Umpires: Field – Jon Vass, Chris Robertson; Boundary – Cooper Eaton, Jasper Eaton; Goal – Gary Coombes, Holly Robertson; BoG Medal: Nicholas Burgess, Goodwood Saints

== C3 ==
=== Ladder ===
Pos	Team	Pld	W	L	D	Forf	PF	PA	PP	Pts
1	Henley	16	16	0	0	0	2219	287	88.54	32
2	Lockleys	16	14	2	0	0	1752	646	73.06	28
3	Unley Mercedes Jets	16	10	5	0	1	1069	1086	49.60	20
4	SMOSH West Lakes	16	9	7	0	0	1131	1082	51.10	18
5	Pembroke OS	16	8	8	0	0	1048	1339	43.90	16
6	Seaton Ramblers	16	7	8	0	1	1027	1056	49.30	14
7	Scotch OC	16	5	9	0	2	795	1214	39.57	10
8	Hope Valley	16	2	14	0	0	879	1780	33.05	4
9	North Haven	16	1	15	0	0	463	1893	19.65	2

source:PlayHQ

=== Finals ===
==== Week 1 ====
	Elimination and Qualifying Finals
Saturday, 24 August (10:15am)	Lockleys 16.10 (106)	def.	Unley Mercedes Jets 7.3 (45)	Lockleys Oval	Report
Saturday, 24 August (10:15am)	SMOSH West Lakes 11.11 (77)	def.	Pembroke OS 5.9 (39)	Largs North Reserve	Report

==== Semi Finals ====
	Semi Finals
Saturday, 31 August (10:00am)	Unley Mercedes Jets 4.9 (33)	def. by	SMOSH West Lakes 8.10 (58)	Kingswood Oval	Report
Saturday, 31 August (10:30am)	Henley 14.11 (95)	def.	Lockleys 4.1 (25)	Henley Memorial Oval	Report

==== Preliminary Final ====
	Preliminary Final
Saturday, 7 September (10:15am)	Lockleys 12.10 (82)	def.	SMOSH West Lakes 2.8 (20)	Richmond Oval	Report

==== Grand Final ====
Grand Final
Saturday, 14 September (10:00am)	Henley	def.	Lockleys	Woodville Oval	Report
3.3 (21); 5.8 (38); 5.13 (43); 10.14 (74)	Q1; Q2; Q3; Final	0.2 (2); 0.3 (3); 0.3 (3); 0.4 (4)	Umpires: Field – Tyson Usher, Richard Williams; Boundary – Harrison Crispin, Zac Moss; Goal – Troy Burge, Paul Hicks; BoG Medal: Jordan Chandley, Henley

== C4 ==
=== Ladder ===
Pos	Team	Pld	W	L	D	Forf	PF	PA	PP	Pts
1	Adelaide University	16	15	1	0	0	1629	527	75.55	30
2	Plympton	16	14	2	0	0	1736	500	77.63	28
3	Morphettville Park	16	13	3	0	0	1514	758	66.63	26
4	Walkerville	16	10	6	0	0	1431	811	63.82	20
5	Kenilworth	16	7	8	0	1	1172	981	54.43	14
6	Gepps Cross	16	6	10	0	0	990	1231	44.57	12
7	Kilburn	16	4	12	0	0	746	1616	31.58	8
8	Hectorville	16	3	12	0	1	564	1449	28.01	6
9	CBC OC	16	0	13	0	3	341	2250	13.16	0

source:PlayHQ

=== Finals ===
==== Week 1 ====
	Elimination and Qualifying Finals
Saturday, 24 August (10:00am)	Walkerville 23.7 (145)	def.	Kenilworth 6.8 (44)	Glandore Oval Reserve	Report
Saturday, 24 August (10:30am)	Plympton 13.13 (91)	def.	Morphettville Park 6.0 (36)	Kellett Reserve Oval	Report

==== Semi Finals ====
	Semi Finals
Saturday, 31 August (10:00am)	Morphettville Park 6.4 (40)	def. by	Walkerville 11.13 (79)	Glandore Oval Reserve	Report
Saturday, 31 August (10:30am)	Adelaide University 3.10 (28)	def. by	Plympton 8.5 (53)	Plympton Oval	Report

==== Preliminary Final ====
	Preliminary Final
Saturday, 7 September (10:15am)	Adelaide University 9.9 (63)	def.	Walkerville 9.3 (57)	Woodville Oval	Report

==== Grand Final ====
Grand Final
Saturday, 14 September (10:00am)	Plympton	def.	Adelaide University	Richmond Oval	Report
0.1 (1); 4.4 (28); 5.5 (35); 10.8 (68)	Q1; Q2; Q3; Final	2.4 (16); 2.4 (16); 4.6 (30); 5.6 (36)	Umpires: Field – Sam Colella, Craig Trewartha; Boundary – Oliver Moss, Conor O’Driscoll; Goal – David Burness, Frankie Creazzo; BoG Medal: Daniel Roach, Plympton

== C5 ==
=== Ladder ===
Pos	Team	Pld	W	L	D	Forf	PF	PA	PP	Pts
1	Golden Grove	18	16	2	0	0	1637	714	69.62	32
2	Prince Alfred OC	18	15	3	0	0	1657	714	69.88	30
3	Woodville South	18	12	6	0	0	1296	825	61.10	24
4	Henley	18	12	6	0	0	1364	901	60.22	24
5	Colonel Light Gardens	18	10	8	0	0	1192	856	58.20	20
6	Adelaide University	18	9	9	0	0	1402	931	60.09	18
7	Marion	18	8	10	0	0	991	1231	44.59	16
8	Mitcham	18	4	14	0	0	923	1158	44.35	8
9	Greenacres	18	3	15	0	0	672	1932	25.80	6
10	Trinity OS	18	1	15	0	2	304	2176	12.25	2

source:PlayHQ

=== Finals ===
==== Week 1 ====
	Elimination and Qualifying Finals
Saturday, 24 August (10:00am)	Prince Alfred OC 10.6 (66)	def. by	Woodville South 10.7 (67)	University Oval (Park 12)	Report
Saturday, 24 August (10:30am)	Henley 8.7 (55)	def.	Colonel Light Gardens 7.12 (54)	Mortlock Park	Report

==== Semi Finals ====
	Semi Finals
Saturday, 31 August (10:00am)	Golden Grove 5.11 (41)	def. by	Woodville South 10.4 (64)	Marion Oval	Report
Saturday, 31 August (10:15am)	Prince Alfred OC 14.8 (92)	def.	Henley 3.8 (26)	Price Memorial Oval	Report

==== Preliminary Final ====
	Preliminary Final
Saturday, 7 September (1:00pm)	Golden Grove 4.12 (36)	def. by	Prince Alfred OC 10.8 (68)	Harpers Field	Report

==== Grand Final ====
Grand Final
Saturday, 14 September (10:00am)	Woodville South	def. by	Prince Alfred OC	Payneham Oval	Report
1.1 (7); 3.4 (22); 3.7 (25); 5.9 (39)	Q1; Q2; Q3; Final	1.2 (8); 2.3 (15); 6.4 (40); 7.6 (48)	Umpires: Field – Howard Noble, Matt Schmidt; Boundary – Archie Spier, Sam Waters; Goal – Sorcha Cowan, Alex Manning; BoG Medal: Edwards Dolling, Prince Alfred OC

== C6 ==
=== Ladder ===
Pos	Team	Pld	W	L	D	Forf	PF	PA	PP	Pts
1	Modbury	17	17	0	0	0	2327	417	84.80	34
2	Adelaide Lutheran	17	15	2	0	0	1901	660	74.22	30
3	Para Hills	17	12	5	0	0	1473	745	66.41	24
4	Adelaide University	17	10	7	0	0	1476	901	62.09	20
5	Salisbury	17	10	6	0	1	1247	999	55.52	20
6	Eastern Park	17	6	11	0	0	900	1510	37.34	12
7	Houghton Districts	17	5	11	1	0	909	1588	36.40	11
8	Ingle Farm	17	4	13	0	0	848	1418	37.42	8
9	St Paul's OS	17	1	9	1	6	431	1745	19.80	3
10	West Croydon	8	0	5	0	3	79	1438	5.20	0

source:PlayHQ

=== Finals ===
==== Week 1 ====
	Elimination and Qualifying Finals
Saturday, 24 August (10:30am)	Adelaide Lutheran 6.10 (46)	def. by	Para Hills 9.12 (66)	Paddocks Oval	Report
Saturday, 24 August (12:00pm)	Adelaide University 13.8 (86)	def.	Salisbury 4.3 (27)	University Oval (Park 12)	Report

==== Semi Finals ====
	Semi Finals
Saturday, 31 August (10:15am)	Adelaide Lutheran 6.12 (68)	def.	Adelaide University 5.4 (34)	Sam Johnson Sportsground	Report
Saturday, 31 August (12:15pm)	Modbury 11.10 (76)	def.	Para Hills 5.4 (34)	Modbury Oval	Report

==== Preliminary Final ====
	Preliminary Final
Saturday, 7 September (10:15am)	Para Hills 3.13 (31)	def. by	Adelaide Lutheran 10.4 (64)	Campbelltown Memorial Oval	Report

==== Grand Final ====
Grand Final
Saturday, 14 September (10:00am)	Modbury	def.	Adelaide Lutheran	Elizabeth Oval	Report
0.1 (1); 2.1 (13); 2.4 (16); 5.7 (37)	Q1; Q2; Q3; Final	2.1 (13); 2.5 (17); 3.7 (25); 3.8 (26)	Umpires: Field – Mark Goodes, Ron Murch; Boundary – Hayden Chester, Patrick Coghill; Goal – Lynton Davies, Ron Field; BoG Medal: Brett Tarca, Modbury

== C7 ==
=== Ladder ===
Pos	Team	Pld	W	L	D	Forf	PF	PA	PP	Pts
1	Tea Tree Gully	18	16	1	1	0	1899	492	79.42	33
2	Rostrevor OC	18	13	5	0	0	1630	669	70.90	26
3	Lockleys	18	13	5	0	0	1497	656	69.53	26
4	Sacred Heart OC	18	11	5	1	1	1422	709	66.72	23
5	Port District	18	11	7	0	0	1339	800	62.59	22
6	Prince Alfred OC	18	10	7	0	0	1106	635	63.52	20
7	Adelaide University	18	8	10	0	0	1170	933	55.63	16
8	Golden Grove	18	4	14	0	0	517	1961	20.86	8
9	Rosewater	17	2	15	0	0	487	1709	22.17	4
10	Para Hills	18	1	17	0	0	348	2791	11.08	2

source:PlayHQ

=== Finals ===
==== Week 1 ====
	Elimination and Qualifying Finals
Saturday, 24 August (12:15pm)	Sacred Heart OC 10.6 (66)	def.	Port District 4.10 (34)	Sacred Heart Middle School Oval	Report
Saturday, 24 August (4:45pm)	Rostrevor OC 13.13 (91)	def.	Lockleys 5.8 (38)	Campbelltown Memorial Oval	Report

==== Semi Finals ====
	Semi Finals
Saturday, 31 August (10:00am)	Lockleys 8.8 (56)	def. by	Sacred Heart OC 8.10 (58)	Lockleys Oval	Report
Saturday, 31 August (12:15pm)	Tea Tree Gully 7.13 (55)	def.	Rostrevor OC 5.5 (35)	Pertaringa Oval	Report

==== Preliminary Final ====
	Preliminary Final
Saturday, 7 September (10:00am)	Rostrevor OC 8.8 (56)	def.	Sacred Heart OC 4.12 (36)	Sacred Heart Senior School Oval	Report

==== Grand Final ====
Grand Final
Saturday, 14 September (10:00am)	Tea Tree Gully	def.	Rostrevor OC	Walkerville Oval	Report
2.1 (13); 6.2 (38); 7.2 (44); 11.2 (68)	Q1; Q2; Q3; Final	2.2 (14); 3.3 (21); 5.5 (35); 6.8 (44)	Umpires: Field – Ian Gore, Brendan Smales; Boundary – Maddy Forde, Charlie Loffler; Goal – Andrew Barkell, Mia Borrello; BoG Medal: Luke Flynn, Tea Tree Gully

== Women's Division 1 ==
=== Seniors ===
==== Ladder ====
Pos	Team	Pld	W	L	D	PF	PA	PP	Pts
1	Payneham NU	12	10	2	0	811	344	70.21	20
2	Henley	12	9	3	0	493	345	58.83	18
3	Broadview	12	6	5	1	461	307	60.02	13
4	Goodwood Saints	12	6	6	0	494	395	55.56	12
5	Morphettville Park	12	5	6	1	454	441	50.72	11
6	Golden Grove	12	5	7	0	374	548	40.56	10
7	SMOSH West Lakes	12	0	12	0	192	899	17.59	0

source:PlayHQ

==== Finals ====
===== Semi Finals =====
	Semi Finals
Saturday, 10 August (3:15pm)	Broadview 7.6 (48)	def.	Goodwood Saints 4.8 (32)	Broadview Oval	Report
Saturday, 10 August (4:45pm)	Payneham NU 9.4 (58)	def.	Henley 6.4 (40)	Payneham Oval	Report

===== Preliminary Final =====
	Preliminary Final
Saturday, 17 August (3:30pm)	Henley 3.5 (23)	def. by	Broadview 5.3 (33)	Campbelltown Memorial Oval	Report

===== Grand Final =====
Grand Final
Saturday, 24 August (3:50pm)	Payneham NU	def.	Broadview	St Marys Park	Report
3.1 (19); 3.3 (21); 4.4 (28); 7.5 (47)	Q1; Q2; Q3; Final	0.1 (1); 3.2 (20); 6.4 (40); 6.6 (42)	Umpires: Field – Jai Birrell, Alex Haughey; Boundary – Kai Dalby, Maddy Forde; Goal – Annette Greenshields, Holly Robertson; BoG Medal: Makaya Bryant, Payneham NU

=== Reserves ===
==== Ladder ====
Pos	Team	Pld	W	L	D	Forf	PF	PA	PP	Pts
1	Broadview	12	12	0	0	0	807	62	92.86	24
2	Payneham NU	12	9	3	0	0	636	246	72.10	18
3	Henley	12	6	6	0	0	346	483	41.73	12
4	Golden Grove	12	5	7	0	0	302	460	39.63	10
5	Goodwood Saints	12	4	8	0	0	422	544	43.68	8
6	SMOSH West Lakes	12	3	9	0	0	299	581	33.97	6
7	Morphettville Park	12	3	8	0	1	235	671	25.93	6

source:PlayHQ

==== Finals ====
===== Semi Finals =====
	Semi Finals
Saturday, 10 August (1:30pm)	Broadview 3.1 (19)	def.	Payneham NU 0.2 (2)	Broadview Oval	Report
Saturday, 10 August (4:45pm)	Henley 4.1 (25)	def. by	Golden Grove 4.14 (38)	Henley Memorial Oval	Report

===== Preliminary Final =====
	Preliminary Final
Saturday, 17 August (1:40pm)	Payneham NU 7.6 (48)	def.	Golden Grove 1.4 (10)	Campbelltown Memorial Oval	Report

===== Grand Final =====
Grand Final
Saturday, 24 August (1:55pm)	Broadview	def.	Payneham NU	St Marys Park	Report
2.0 (12); 4.0 (24); 5.2 (32); 6.5 (41)	Q1; Q2; Q3; Final	2.2 (14); 4.2 (26); 4.3 (27); 4.8 (28)	Umpires: Field – Markita Bond, Chris Lees; Boundary – Jaylen Haines, Rylan Henke; Goal – Sorcha Cowan, Michael Thayu; BoG Medal: Mackenzie Lum, Broadview

== Women's Division 2 ==
=== Seniors ===
==== Ladder ====
Pos	Team	Pld	W	L	D	Forf	PF	PA	PP	Pts
1	Happy Valley	14	13	1	0	0	857	204	80.77	26
2	Hectorville	14	10	4	0	0	766	272	73.79	20
3	Hope Valley	14	10	4	0	0	667	322	67.44	20
4	Tea Tree Gully	14	10	4	0	0	651	331	66.29	20
5	Old Ignatians	14	7	7	0	0	418	468	47.17	14
6	Lockleys	14	4	10	0	0	287	795	26.52	8
7	Westminster OS	14	1	12	0	1	244	691	26.09	2
8	Flinders Park	14	1	13	0	0	172	979	14.94	2

source:PlayHQ

==== Finals ====
===== Semi Finals =====
	Semi Finals
Saturday, 10 August (3:15pm)	Happy Valley 5.6 (36)	def. by	Hectorville 9.6 (60)	Happy Valley Oval	Report
Saturday, 10 August (4:45pm)	Hope Valley 9.3 (57)	def.	Tea Tree Gully 7.7 (49)	Hope Valley Sporting Club	Report

===== Preliminary Final =====
	Preliminary Final
Saturday, 17 August (11:50am)	Happy Valley 8.10 (58)	def.	Hope Valley 2.2 (14)	Campbelltown Memorial Oval	Report

===== Grand Final =====
Grand Final
Saturday, 24 August (11:50am)	Hectorville	def. by	Happy Valley	St Marys Park	Report
3.4 (22); 5.5 (35); 7.7 (49); 7.8 (50)	Q1; Q2; Q3; Final	2.1 (13); 6.1 (37); 6.2 (38); 8.5 (53)	Umpires: Field – Mark Barnett, Aaron Reval; Boundary – Zoe Blundell, Sam Kelly; Goal – Mia Borrello, Jackson Webber; BoG Medal: Jorja Hooper, Happy Valley

=== Reserves ===
==== Ladder ====
Pos	Team	Pld	W	L	D	PF	PA	PP	Pts
1	Happy Valley	12	9	3	0	647	122	84.13	18
2	Tea Tree Gully	12	9	3	0	503	336	59.95	18
3	Hectorville	12	8	4	0	551	303	64.51	16
4	Flinders Park	12	6	6	0	267	371	41.84	12
5	Old Ignatians	12	4	7	1	295	514	36.46	9
6	Lockleys	12	3	9	0	204	496	29.14	6
7	Hope Valley	12	2	9	1	266	591	31.03	5

source:PlayHQ

==== Finals ====
===== Semi Finals =====
	Semi Finals
Saturday, 10 August (11:45am)	Hectorville 11.9 (75)	def.	Flinders Park 0.1 (1)	Happy Valley Oval	Report
Saturday, 10 August (1:30pm)	Happy Valley 4.5 (29)	def. by	Tea Tree Gully 10.1 (61)	Happy Valley Oval	Report

===== Preliminary Final =====
	Preliminary Final
Saturday, 17 August (10:00am)	Happy Valley 2.2 (14)	def. by	Hectorville 4.14 (38)	Campbelltown Memorial Oval	Report

===== Grand Final =====
Grand Final
Saturday, 24 August (10:00am)	Tea Tree Gully	def. by	Hectorville	St Marys Park	Report
1.1 (7); 3.2 (20); 3.3 (21); 4.7 (31)	Q1; Q2; Q3; Final	3.1 (19); 3.3 (21); 5.9 (39); 6.9 (45)	Umpires: Field – Jacob Danchenko, Steve Pringle; Boundary – Zane Gabel, Leif Mosley; Goal – Stan Filipek, Alex Manning; BoG Medal: Matilda Margitich, Hectorville

== Women's Division 3 ==
=== Ladder ===
Pos	Team	Pld	W	L	D	Forf	PF	PA	PP	Pts
1	Brighton Bombers	14	12	1	1	0	519	243	68.11	25
2	Eastern Park	14	10	4	0	0	559	396	58.53	20
3	Pulteney	14	9	4	1	0	668	329	67.00	19
4	Angle Vale	14	9	4	1	0	557	440	55.86	19
5	Port District	14	8	5	1	0	544	291	65.14	17
6	Pembroke OS	14	3	11	0	0	311	563	35.58	6
7	Adelaide University	14	2	12	0	0	166	611	21.36	4
8	Gepps Cross	14	1	12	0	1	285	736	27.91	2

source:PlayHQ

=== Finals ===
==== Semi Finals ====
	Semi Finals
Saturday, 3 August (10:30am)	Pulteney 2.6 (18)	def. by	Angle Vale 5.3 (33)	Morgan Oval (Park 20)	Report
Saturday, 3 August (1:30pm)	Brighton Bombers 3.6 (24)	def. by	Eastern Park 4.1 (25)	Edwardstown Oval	Report

==== Preliminary Final ====
	Preliminary Final
Saturday, 10 August (3:30pm)	Brighton Bombers 2.3 (15)	def. by	Angle Vale 2.5 (17)	Carol Martin Reserve (Blair Athol Reserve)	Report

==== Grand Final ====
Grand Final
Saturday, 17 August (3:30pm)	Eastern Park	def. by	Angle Vale	St Marys Park	Report
0.0 (0); 0.1 (1) 0.3 (3)	Q1; Q2; Q3; Final	0.3 (3); 5.5 (35); 7.8 (50); 8.9 (57)	Umpires: Field – Aaron Reval, Greg von Einem; Boundary – Billy Rowston, Sam Waters; Goal – Maeve Elshaug-Betson, Jackson Webber; BoG Medal: Brittany Perry, Angle Vale

== Women's Division 4 ==
=== Ladder ===
Pos	Team	Pld	W	L	D	Forf	PF	PA	PP	Pts
1	Mitcham	15	13	2	0	0	643	162	79.87	26
2	Modbury	15	12	3	0	0	487	176	73.45	24
3	Woodville South	15	9	6	0	0	357	288	55.34	18
4	Scotch OC	15	6	8	0	1	386	406	48.73	12
5	Loreto OS	15	5	9	0	1	310	419	42.52	10
6	Fitzroy	15	0	14	0	1	51	783	6.11	0

source:PlayHQ

=== Finals ===
==== Semi Finals ====
	Semi Finals
Saturday, 3 August (3:15pm)	Mitcham 5.6 (36)	def.	Modbury 0.1 (1)	Price Memorial Oval	Report
Saturday, 3 August (3:15pm)	Woodville South 5.6 (36)	def. by	Scotch OC 6.4 (40)	Ledger Reserve	Report

==== Preliminary Final ====
	Preliminary Final
Saturday, 10 August (1:40pm)	Modbury 1.3 (9)	def. by	Scotch OC 2.7 (19)	Carol Martin Reserve (Blair Athol Reserve)	Report

==== Grand Final ====
Grand Final
Saturday, 17 August (1:40pm)	Mitcham	def.	Scotch OC	St Marys Park	Report
0.2 (2); 1.4 (10); 3.6 (24); 3.6 (24)	Q1; Q2; Q3; Final	0.0 (0); 1.1 (7); 1.1 (7); 1.2 (8)	Umpires: Field – Rob McKay, Alison McMeekin; Boundary – Cameron Medlow, Elliot Vinall; Goal – Stan Filipek, Jason Zwarts; BoG Medal: Gemma Monaghan, Mitcham

== Women's Division 5 ==
=== Ladder ===
Pos	Team	Pld	W	L	D	Forf	PF	PA	PP	Pts
1	Athelstone	15	15	0	0	0	907	201	81.85	30
2	Salisbury	15	11	3	0	1	826	305	73.03	22
3	Edwardstown	15	10	5	0	0	705	320	68.78	20
4	Kilburn	15	6	9	0	0	453	478	48.65	12
5	North Haven	15	2	8	0	5	211	791	21.05	4
6	West Croydon	15	1	14	0	0	126	1133	10.00	2

source:PlayHQ

=== Finals ===
==== Semi Finals ====
	Semi Finals
Saturday, 3 August (3:15pm)	Athelstone 10.4 (64)	def.	Salisbury 2.5 (17)	Max Amber Sportsfield	Report
Saturday, 3 August (3:15pm)	Edwardstown 7.13 (55)	def.	Kilburn 2.4 (16)	Edwardstown Oval	Report

==== Preliminary Final ====
Preliminary Final
Salisbury 0.0 (0)	def. by	Edwardstown 10.0 (60)	Report
Salisbury Forfeited

==== Grand Final ====
Grand Final
Saturday, 17 August (11:50am)	Athelstone	def. by	Edwardstown	St Marys Park	Report
0.1 (1); 0.1 (1); 0.1 (1); 0.1 (1)	Q1; Q2; Q3; Final	0.1 (1); 0.9 (9); 2.10 (22); 2.13 (25)	Umpires: Field – Brett Crowhurst, James Paschalis; Boundary – Owen Chilman, Lewis Rodda; Goal – Lynton Davies, Ron Field; BoG Medal: Grace Sim, Edwardstown

== Women's Division 6 ==
=== Ladder ===
Pos	Team	Pld	W	L	D	Forf	PF	PA	PP	Pts
1	Marion	15	15	0	0	0	1000	85	92.16	30
2	Houghton Districts	15	11	4	0	0	807	304	72.63	22
3	Salisbury North	15	9	5	1	0	478	435	52.35	19
4	Ingle Farm	15	4	9	2	0	371	424	46.66	10
5	Mitchell Park	15	4	8	1	2	265	616	30.07	9
6	Smithfield	15	0	14	0	1	114	1171	8.87	0

source:PlayHQ

=== Finals ===
==== Semi Finals ====
	Semi Finals
Saturday, 3 August (3:15pm)	Marion 7.9 (51)	def.	Houghton Districts 3.4 (22)	Marion Oval	Report
Saturday, 3 August (4:45pm)	Salisbury North 2.2 (14)	def.	Ingle Farm 0.5 (5)	Salisbury North Oval	Report

==== Preliminary Final ====
	Preliminary Final
Saturday, 10 August (10:00am)	Houghton Districts 8.7 (55)	def.	Salisbury North 3.6 (24)	Carol Martin Reserve (Blair Athol Reserve)	Report

==== Grand Final ====
Grand Final
Saturday, 17 August (10:00am)	Marion	def.	Houghton Districts	St Marys Park	Report
2.1 (13); 3.3 (21); 5.4 (34); 7.4 (46)	Q1; Q2; Q3; Final	0.0 (0); 0.0 (0); 0.0 (0); 1.0 (6)	Umpires: Field – Martin Daunt, Simon McMahon; Boundary – Harrison Crispin, Aksh Hu; Goal – Lachlan Northcote, Michael Thayu; BoG Medal: Emily Pelling, Marion

== Men's Medallists ==
=== Best and Fairest ===
Division	Medallist	Club	Medal Name	Votes
M1	Abaina Davis	Glenunga	Keith Sims OAM Medal	30
M1R	Declan Tomney	Golden Grove	EA Davoren Medal	17
M2	Mitchell Grigg	Athelstone	FA Bloch Medal	30
M2R	Adam Casburn	Athelstone	G Palasis Medal	19
M2R	Izak Richards	Flinders Park	G Palasis Medal	19
M3	Mark Rowe	North Haven	GS Heard Medal	29
M3R	Josh Stevens	Unley Mercedes Jets	DG McKay Medal	24
M4	Alex Barns	Morphettville Park	JW Schulz Medal	24
M4R	Brodie Clark	Plympton	RB Lambert Medal	20
M5	Kye Dean	Colonel Light Gardens	JB Dicker Medal	26
M5R	Sean Bayzand	Marion	JR Wilson Medal	23
M6	Sean Hee	Salisbury	AG Bert Medal	28
M6R	Paul Wootton	Adelaide Lutheran	AEC Treloar Medal	16
M7	Luke Allan	Hackham	RA Stennett Medal	30
M7R	Anthony Cream	Flinders University	FJ Monten Medal	22
C1	Luke Nicholls	Port District	P Collins Medal	28
C2	Todd Stanton	Modbury	JA Burchell Medal	37
C3	Luke Wilksch	Henley	CG Tideman Medal	16
C4	Heath Deer	Plympton	HD Naylor Medal	17
C5	Tom Wormald	Henley	CC Sando Medal	22
C6	Benjamin Finch	Modbury	HV Millard Medal	31
C7	Sam Tagg	Rostrevor OC	RH Elix Medal	32

=== Leading Goal Kicker ===
Division	Name	Club	Goals
M1	Brodie Latham	Tee Tree Gully	45
M1R	Joel Horskins	Golden Grove	47
M2	Malachai Ah Matt	Modbury	54
M2R	Matthew Brown	Rostrevor	45
M3	Ben Haren	Lockleys	72
M3R	Aren Mattschoss	Hope Valley	48
M4	Zac Peake	Plympton	69
M4R	James Siemering	Kenilworth	44
M5	Maxwell Smyth	Mitcham	89
M5R	Sam Prior	Mitcham	72
M6	Shawn Mansell	Eastern Park	121
M6R	Jordan Perna-Hague	Ingle Farm	66
M7	Daniel Weetra	Para Hills	128
M7R	Frankie Cirocco	Para Hills	71
C1	Luke Bartlett	Prince Alfred OC	56
C1	Will Dalwood	Prince Alfred OC	56
C2	Joel Vaneveld	Modbury	61
C3	Daniel Wilksch	Henley	77
C4	Robert Wilde	Plympton	81
C5	Joel Chapman	Henley	86
C6	Corey Polyak	Modbury	68
C7	Michael Kocman	Sacred Heart OC	67

== Women's Medallists ==
=== Best and Fairest ===
Division	Medallist	Club	Medal Name	Votes
W1	Abby Klaebe	Payneham NU	Gina Dutschke Medal	22
W1R	Georgia Robertson	Broadview	Louise Crowe Medal	11
W2	Hayley Taheny	Hope Valley	Catherine Mulvihill Medal	16
W2R	Kat Vlachos	Happy Valley	Murray Amos Medal	13
W3	Brittany Perry	Angle Vale	Narelle Smith Medal	28
W4	Reni Schlink	Woodville South	Stephen Baxter & Jules Smith Medal	20
W5	Maka Geale	Salisbury	Anni Sergeant Medal	20
W5	Jess Patching	Edwardstown	Anni Sergeant Medal	20
W6	Taylan Ralph	Houghton Districts	Georgi Iley Medal	28

=== Leading Goal Kicker ===
Division	Name	Club	Medal Name	Goals
W1	Abby Klaebe	Payneham NU	Trudy Glazbrook Award	23
W1R	Tashara Wilson	SMOSH West Lakes		20
W2	Haley Taheny	Hope Valley		48
W2R	Kat Vlachos	Happy Valley		25
W3	Tamara Clapton	Eastern Park		44
W4	Jo Paterson	Scotch OC		19
W5	Natalie Lomman	Athelstone		45
W6	Kayla Foran	Marion		40
W6	Taylan Ralph	Houghton Districts		40

== Team of the Year ==
=== Men ===
Men's TotY
B:	Zac Smith (Glenunga)	Aidan Thatcher (Golden Grove)	Seb Kerrish (Sacred Heart OC)
HB:	Brad McKenzie (Payneham NU)	Jonnie Read (St. Peter's OC	Joey Haines (Port District)
C:	Lewis Johnstone (Golden Grove)	Jake Pitman (Golden Grove)	Louis Sharrad (Port District)
HF:	Lachlan McNamara (Prince Alfred OC)	Will Rivers (Brighton)	Charlie Pridham (Glenunga)
F:	Brodie Latham (Tea Tree Gully)	John Boras (Broadview)	Cameron Rankine (Sacred Heart OC)
Foll:	Jordan West (Glenunga)	Abaina Davis (Glenunga) capt.	Matt Nunn (Payneham NU)
Int:	Sam Parsons (Glenunga)	Scott Lycett (Port District)	Tom McDermott (Sacred Heart OC)
Int:	Malachy Carruthers (St. Peter's OC)		
Coach:	Nathan Grima (Glenunga)		

=== Women ===
Women's TofY
B:	Ella Metcalfe (Broadview)	Jess Meachin (Payneham NU) vice-capt.	Lara Chehade (Henley)
HB:	Amalie Innes (Golden Grove)		Astrid Gooley (SMOSH West Lakes)
C:	Olivia McEvoy (Goodwood Saints)	Abby Klaebe (Payneham NU) capt.	Ailene Hiebner (Golden Grove)
HF:	Emma Whyte (Goodwood Saints)		Chloe Samuel (Payneham NU)
F:	Remy Grant (Broadview)	Letisha Ackland (Payneham NU)	Liana Antionoli (Broadview)
Foll:	Ellie Fixter (Henley)	Amy Jones (Broadview)	Madelyn Griffiths (Goodwood Saints)
Int:	Megan Harper (Morphettville Park)	Zara Bowles (Goodwood Saints)	Mia Smith (Henley)
Int:	Tessa Kohn (Morphettville Park)		
Coach:	Garry McIntosh (Payneham NU)		
