= Northern Territory Buffaloes =

Information
- League: Claxton Shield
- Location: Northern Territory
- Founded: 1981
- Folded: 1988

Northern Territory Buffaloes was a baseball team from the Northern Territory that competed in the Australian national Claxton Shield competition from 1981 until 1988. The Buffaloes enjoyed little success during its eight-year admittance winning only 1 game, in 1987, against South Australia. Despite their poor on-field results, the Buffaloes did manage to play a few competitive games.

- At the 1983 Claxton Shield, the Buffaloes tied the game 2 all against Western Australia, after Bill Fryar doubled down the left field line with the bases loaded. Despite a strong pitching performance by Vic Stanfield, they could not add to their score and eventually lost 5 - 2.
- At the 1984 Claxton Shield, the Buffaloes scored 11 runs against South Australia in the 1st inning, but lost the game in extra innings, 12 - 11. Bill Hutcheson became the first Territorian to hit a home run, against Victoria.
- At the 1985 Claxton Shield, the Buffaloes held a 15 - 0 lead against New South Wales after 5 innings, only to lose the game 16 - 15.
- At the 1987 Claxton Shield, the Buffaloes win their first (and only) game against South Australia. Buffalo player Brad Kerr wins "Rookie of the Year", the only Territory player to win any award at a Claxton Shield.
- At the 1988 Claxton Shield, Buffalo teenager Scott McCormack pitched 10 strong innings against Victoria, only to lose the game in extra innings 3 - 2.

Bill Hutcheson, a catcher from originally Tennant Creek and later Darwin, was the only player to play in all 8 Claxton Shields for the Territory.

Northern Territory Buffaloes roster
1981 Team roster
| Pitchers: 1. 10 Jeff Hyde; 2. 17 Wayne Longstaff; 3. 20 David McKeon; 4. 22 Tony Prescott; 5. 6 Lance Schmidt; 6. 21 Victor Stanfield; 7. 7 Steve Tarte; Catchers: 1. 12 Bill Hutcheson; 2. 3 Tim Hyde | Infielders: 1. 8 Doug Alderson; 2. 15 Robbie Decet; 3. 4 Bill Fryar; 4. 14 Fred Kovoloff; 5. 5 Graeme Masters | Outfielders: 1. 13 Lyn Bradshaw; 2. 11 Jeff Goodworth; 3. 18 Leigh Halprin; 4. 9 Lindsay Heaver | Manager: 1. 1 John Tarca; Coaches: 1. 2 Graham Shaw; Roster 1981 to 1988 → Claxton Shield |

== See also ==
- Baseball NT
- Baseball in Australia
- Australian Baseball League
