= Clayton Byrne =

Former Australian baseball player

Personal information
- Full name: Clayton Philip Byrne
- National team: 2000 Sydney Olympic Team
- Born: 12 February 1972 (age 53); Guildford, Western Australia, Australia
- Occupation: Currently Unemployed
- Height: 189 cm (6 ft 2 in)
- Weight: 115 kg (254 lb; 18 st 2 lb)

Sport
- Country: Australia
- Sport: Baseball
- League: Claxton Shield
- Team: Perth Heat

Clayton Byrne (born 12 February 1972 in Guildford, Western Australia) is an Australian baseball player. He represented Australia at the 2000 Summer Olympics.

Byrne was inducted into the Baseball WA Hall of Fame in 2021.
