= 2005 Claxton Shield =

2005 Claxton Shield teams

Results and Statistics of the 2005 Claxton Shield

== Results ==
=== Round 1: Saturday, 22 January 2005 ===
Round 1
South Australia	2	def. by	Victoria	6
Australian Provincial	3	def. by	Western Australia	10
New South Wales	3	def.	Queensland	0

=== Round 2: Sunday, 23 January 2005 ===
Round 2
Victoria		RAINED OUT	Australian Provincial	
Queensland		RAINED OUT	South Australia	
Western Australia	6	def.	New South Wales	3

=== Round 3: Monday, 24 January 2005 ===
Round 3
Australian Provincial	5	def.	Queensland	4
Victoria	0	def. by	Western Australia	4
South Australia	5	def.	New South Wales	0

=== Round 4: Tuesday, 25 January 2005 ===
Round 4
Queensland	2	def.	Western Australia	0
Australian Provincial	4	def. by	South Australia	8
New South Wales	5	def.	Victoria	3

=== Round 5: Wednesday, 26 January 2005 ===
Round 5
Western Australia	5	def.	South Australia	4
Victoria	5	def.	Queensland	0
New South Wales	3	def.	Australian Provincial	2

=== Round 2 Make-up: Thursday, 27 January 2005 ===
Games 1 and 2 on 23 January were rained out, so a make up round was called.

Round 2 Make-up
Victoria	6	def.	Australian Provincial	1
Queensland	1	def. by	South Australia	2

== Ladder ==
Team	Played	Wins	Loss	Drawn	Win %	Runs For	Runs Against	Percentage
Perth Heat	5	4	1	0	.800	25	12	.676
Victoria Aces	5	3	2	0	.600	20	12	.625
South Australia	5	3	2	0	.600	22	16	.579
NSW Patriots	5	3	2	0	.600	14	16	.467
Australia Provincial	5	1	4	0	.200	15	26	.366
Queensland Rams	5	1	4	0	.200	7	15	.318

== Finals ==
=== Semi-finals ===
Semi-Finals
Victoria	1	def.	Western Australia	0
New South Wales	2	def.	South Australia	0

=== Grand final ===
Grand Final
Victoria	4	def.	New South Wales	8
