= 1999–2000 International Baseball League of Australia season =

Results from the 1999-2000 International Baseball League of Australia.

== Ladder ==
| Team | Wins | Loss | % | GB |
|---|---|---|---|---|
| Victoria Aces | 11 | 6 | 0.647 | - |
| Western Heelers | 10 | 7 | 0.588 | 1 |
| NSW Country | 9 | 8 | 0.529 | 2 |
| Queensland Rams | 8 | 9 | 0.471 | 3 |
| South Australian Bite | 7 | 10 | 0.412 | 4 |
| NSW Storm | 6 | 11 | 0.353 | 5 |

== Championship series ==
=== Northern Division Play-off Series ===
Held at Palm Meadows, Gold Coast.

Game 1

| Team | 1 | 2 | 3 | 4 | 5 | 6 | 7 | 8 | 9 | R | H | E |
|---|---|---|---|---|---|---|---|---|---|---|---|---|
| Queensland Rams | ? | ? | ? | ? | ? | ? | ? | ? | ? | 11 | ? | ? |
| Country NSW | ? | ? | ? | ? | ? | ? | ? | ? | ? | 4 | ? | ? |
WP: ? (1-0) LP: ? (0-1) Sv: ? Home runs: Rams: ? Country: ?

Game 2

| Team | 1 | 2 | 3 | 4 | 5 | 6 | 7 | 8 | 9 | R | H | E |
|---|---|---|---|---|---|---|---|---|---|---|---|---|
| NSW Country | ? | ? | ? | ? | ? | ? | ? | ? | ? | 4 | ? | ? |
| Queensland Rams | ? | ? | ? | ? | ? | ? | ? | ? | ? | 6 | ? | ? |
WP: ? (1-0) LP: ? (0-1) Sv: ? Home runs: Country: ? Rams: ?

=== Southern Division Play-Off Series ===
Held at Melbourne Ballpark, Altona, Melbourne.

Game 1

| Team | 1 | 2 | 3 | 4 | 5 | 6 | 7 | 8 | 9 | R | H | E |
|---|---|---|---|---|---|---|---|---|---|---|---|---|
| Western Heelers | ? | ? | ? | ? | ? | ? | ? | ? | ? | 2 | ? | ? |
| Victoria Aces | ? | ? | ? | ? | ? | ? | ? | ? | ? | 3 | ? | ? |
WP: ? (1-0) LP: ? (0-1) Sv: ? Home runs: Heelers: ? Aces: ?

Game 2

| Team | 1 | 2 | 3 | 4 | 5 | 6 | 7 | 8 | 9 | R | H | E |
|---|---|---|---|---|---|---|---|---|---|---|---|---|
| Victoria Aces | ? | ? | ? | ? | ? | ? | ? | ? | ? | 1 | ? | ? |
| Western Heelers | ? | ? | ? | ? | ? | ? | ? | ? | ? | 7 | ? | ? |
WP: ? (1-0) LP: ? (0-1) Sv: ? Home runs: Aces: ? Heelers: ?

Game 3

| Team | 1 | 2 | 3 | 4 | 5 | 6 | 7 | 8 | 9 | R | H | E |
|---|---|---|---|---|---|---|---|---|---|---|---|---|
| Western Heelers | ? | ? | ? | ? | ? | ? | ? | ? | ? | 4 | ? | ? |
| Victoria Aces | ? | ? | ? | ? | ? | ? | ? | ? | ? | 3 | ? | ? |
WP: ? (1-0) LP: ? (0-1) Sv: ? Home runs: Heelers: ? Aces: ?

=== Championship series ===
Held at Palm Meadow Baseball Field, Gold Coast.

Game 1

| Team | 1 | 2 | 3 | 4 | 5 | 6 | 7 | 8 | 9 | R | H | E |
|---|---|---|---|---|---|---|---|---|---|---|---|---|
| Western Heelers | ? | ? | ? | ? | ? | ? | ? | ? | ? | 9 | ? | ? |
| Queensland Rams | ? | ? | ? | ? | ? | ? | ? | ? | ? | 5 | ? | ? |
WP: ? (1-0) LP: ? (0-1) Sv: ? Home runs: Heelers: ? Rams: ?

Game 2

| Team | 1 | 2 | 3 | 4 | 5 | 6 | 7 | 8 | 9 | R | H | E |
|---|---|---|---|---|---|---|---|---|---|---|---|---|
| Queensland Rams | ? | ? | ? | ? | ? | ? | ? | ? | ? | 9 | ? | ? |
| Western Heelers | ? | ? | ? | ? | ? | ? | ? | ? | ? | 8 | ? | ? |
WP: ? (1-0) LP: ? (0-1) Sv: ? Home runs: Rams: ? Heelers: ?

Game 3

| Team | 1 | 2 | 3 | 4 | 5 | 6 | 7 | 8 | 9 | R | H | E |
|---|---|---|---|---|---|---|---|---|---|---|---|---|
| Western Heelers | ? | ? | ? | ? | ? | ? | ? | ? | ? | 3 | ? | ? |
| Queensland Rams | ? | ? | ? | ? | ? | ? | ? | ? | ? | 2 | ? | ? |
WP: ? (1-0) LP: ? (0-1) Sv: ? Home runs: Heelers: ? Rams: ?

== Awards ==
| Award | Person | Team |
|---|---|---|
| Qantas Umpire of the Year | Paul Begg | South Australia |
| Rookie of the Year | Daniel Floyd | Western Heelers |
| Golden Glove Award | Rodney Van Buizen | NSW Storm |
| Reliever of the Year | Shane Tonkin | Western Heelers |
| Pitcher of the Year | Brett Baker | Queensland Rams |
| Batting Championship Title | Gavin Fingleson | Country NSW |
| Manager of the Year | Shane Barclay | Country NSW |
| Most Valuable Player | Chris Snelling | Country NSW |
| Championship Series MVP | Clayton Byrne | Western Heelers |
