= Andrew Scott (baseball) =

Australian baseball player (born 1969)

Personal information
- Born: 22 December 1969 (age 55); Adelaide, South Australia, Australia

Sport
- Country: Australia
- Sport: Baseball

Andrew Scott (born 22 December 1969 in Adelaide, South Australia) is an Australian baseball player. He represented Australia at the 1996 Summer Olympics.
