= Queensland Rams =

Australian state baseball team

- [[File: |frameless|class=pageimage|alt=]] Logo

Information
- League: IBLA (1999-2000 & 2002), Claxton Shield (1934–88, 2003–2010.
- Location: Queensland
- Ballpark: Holloway Field
- Founded: 1939
- Nickname: Rams
- League championships: 1982 Claxton Shield; 1983 Claxton Shield; 1987 Claxton Shield; 1988 Claxton Shield; 2003 Claxton Shield; 2006 Claxton Shield
- Former ballpark(s): John Murray Field; Baxter Field; Brisbane Exhibition Ground
- Colours: Maroon, Navy, White
- Mascot: Ronny the Ram
- Manager: Dave Nilsson

Current uniforms
Home	Away

Queensland Rams compete in the Claxton Shield Baseball Championship in Australia. The Rams were one of the founding teams of the Claxton Shield in 1934 and competed as Queensland until 1988. Between 1988 and 1999, the Claxton Shield was awarded to the winner of the Australian Baseball League. In 1999, the Rams were invited to join the International Baseball League of Australia in which they competed for 2 seasons (1999-2000 and 2002). After this point, the Claxton Shield reverted to a competition similar to that of 1988.

== History ==
Season	Finish
1999-00	2nd
2002	3rd
2003	1st
2004	2nd
2005	5th
2006	1st
2007	4th
2008	2nd Eastern
2009	4th

== Diamond All-Star Team ==
On 2 December 2008 Baseball Queensland released in honour of the 75th anniversary of the Claxton Shield, an All-Star team. Nominees must have played in at least one Claxton Shield competition between 1934 and 2008. This includes all ABL competition between 1990 and 1999 where the Claxton Shield continued to be awarded to the ABL Champion each year. Teams consist of 10 position players (maximum of one player per position, plus one DH and one utility), eight pitchers, one manager and three assistant coaches.

Position	Name	Position	Name	Position	Name
P	Allan Albury	C	Dave Nilsson	DH	Brett Roneberg
P	Kevin Albury	1B	Ron Johnson	Utility	Peter Dutton
P	Matt Gahan	2B	Trent Durrington	Manager	Mike Young
P	Kim Jessop	3B	Larry Home	Coach	Peter Gahan
P	Adrian Meagher	SS	Wayne Reed	Coach	Steve Gilmore
P	Bob Nilsson	LF	Peter Vogler	Coach	Ted Roebuck
P	Gary Nilsson	CF	Grant McDonald		
P	Phil Stockman	RF	Geoff Martin		

== 2010 Claxton Shield squad ==
Queensland Ram's 30-man roster for the 2010 Claxton Shield. The active roster is for the series against New South Wales Patriots.
