= South Australia (baseball team) =

Information
- League: IBLA (1999-00 & 2002), Claxton Shield (1934–88, 2003–2010.
- Location: South Australia
- Ballpark: Norwood Oval; 1961-1989; 2010
- Founded: 1934
- League championships: 15 (Claxton Shield)
- 2008: 3–9 (3rd south)
- Former name(s): South Australia Bite
- Manager: Mark Haylock

Current uniforms
Home	Away

South Australia (previously known as the South Australian Bite) competes in the Claxton Shield Baseball Championship in Australia. As one of the founding teams of the Claxton Shield in 1934, they participated until 1988, when the Shield began being awarded to the winner of the Australian Baseball League. In 1999, they were invited to join the International Baseball League of Australia, where they competed for two seasons (1999–2000 and 2002). After that, the Claxton Shield returned to a format similar to the one used prior to 1988.

== History ==
Season	Finish
1999-00	5th
2002	4th
2003	5th
2004	3rd
2005	3rd
2006	6th
2007	3rd
2008	3rd Southern

== 2009 Claxton Shield squad ==
South Australia's 19-man roster for the 2009 Claxton Shield, Announced by Baseball South Australia.

2009 South Australia roster
Active roster		Coaches
Pitchers: 24 Phil Brassington; 8 Adam Crabb; 9 Chris Doyle; 21 Lachlan Eldridge; 13 Micheal Ewart; 26 Darren Fidge; 18 Tom Fieburg; 27 Chris Lawson; 5 Nick Talbot; 19 Jay Ziersch	Catchers: 11 Brendan Pett; Infielders: 3 Josh Cakebread; 1 Jeremy Crasswell; 2 Jared Kempf; 12 Craig Watts; 22 Stefan Welch; Outfielders: 14 Angus Roeger; 10 Ben Wigmore; 20 Dan Wilson	Coaches: 7 Brian Cakebread (assistant coach); 28 Jeff Downs (assistant coach); 25 David Hilterbrand (executive officer); -- Dave Watkins (physio)

== Famous players ==
- Vic Richardson
- Ian Chappell
- Mark Hutton
- Shayne Bennett
- Luke Prokopec
- Andrew Scott
