= Victoria Aces =

Australian baseball team

- Logo

Information
- League: IBLA (1999-00 & 2002); Claxton Shield (1934-88, 2003-10.
- Location: Victoria
- Ballpark: Melbourne Ballpark
- Founded: 1934
- League championships: 16 (Claxton Shield)
- 2008: 7-5 (2nd south)
- Former name: Victoria
- Manager: David White

Current uniforms
Home	Away

The Victoria Aces are an Australian baseball team who compete in the Claxton Shield Baseball Championship. One of the founding teams of the Claxton Shield in 1934, they competed until 1988. Thereafter the Claxton Shield was awarded to the winner of the Australian Baseball League until 2002. In 1999 the Victoria Aces accepted an invitation to join the International Baseball League of Australia. They competed in the League for two seasons (1999–2000 and 2002); after this point the Claxton Shield reverted to a competition similar to 1988.

Baseball Victoria (BV) selects the Victoria Aces team to compete in the Claxton Shield. BV also governs all levels of baseball in the state of Victoria, and directly runs the State League, which is the top level of competition in the state and the source of the majority of Australian-based players selected for the Victoria Aces.

== History ==
Season	Finish
1999-00	3rd
2002	1st
2003	2nd
2004	6th
2005	2nd
2006	2nd
2007	1st
2008	2nd Southern

== 2009 Claxton Shield roster ==
Victoria Ace's 19-man roster for 2009 Claxton Shield, announced by Baseball Victoria, consisted of:

2009 Victoria Aces roster
Active roster		Coaches
Pitchers: 21 Dean Barker; 6 Elliot Biddle; 7 Adam Blackley; 22 Darryn Cassidy; 11 Blake Cunningham; 4 Donovan Hendricks; 10 Kable Hogben; 14 Glen Richards	Catchers: 23 Grant Karlsen; 24 Tristian McDonald; Infielders: 29 Hayden Dingle; 20 Brad Harman; 8 Scott McIntyre; 10 Brett Tamburrino; Outfielders: 16 Daniel Berg; 8 Scott Wearne; 12 Paul Weichard	Coaches: 28 Phil Allen (assistant coach); 26 Damian Shanahan (assistant coach); 27 Lee Hogan (executive officer); -- Alicia Tang (physio)
