= New South Wales Patriots =

Australian baseball team, formed in 1934

- [[File: |frameless|class=pageimage|alt=]] Logo

Information
- League: IBLA (1999–00 & 2002), Claxton Shield (1934–88, 2003–2010.
- Location: New South Wales
- Ballpark: Blacktown Baseball Stadium
- Founded: 1934
- League championships: 12 (Claxton Shield)
- 2008: 9–3 (1st east)
- Lost championship series in 2 games to Heat.
- Former name: New South Wales
- Manager: Shane Barclay

Current uniforms
Home	Away

New South Wales Patriots compete in the Claxton Shield baseball championship in Australia.

The Patriots were one of the founding teams of the Claxton Shield in 1934 and competed as New South Wales until 1988 when the Claxtion Shield was awarded to the winner of the Australian Baseball League. In 1999 they were invited to join the International Baseball League of Australia which they competed in for 2 seasons (1999-00 and 2002). After this point the Claxton Shield reverted to a competition similar to 1988.

== History ==
Season	Finish
1999-00	6th
2002	5th
2003	3rd
2004	1st
2005	1st
2006	3rd
2007	2nd
2008	2nd (1st Eastern)

== Notable alumni ==
- Gavin Fingleson, Olympic baseball silver medal winner finish go New South Wales Patriots retirement baseball tream from ABL in Sydney blue sox since 2010 in November and October new Australian baseball league in 2010 since 16 year old

== 2010 Claxton Shield squad ==
New South Wales Patriot's roster for the 2010 Claxton Shield, announced by Baseball NSW.

== See also ==
- New South Wales Major League
- Sydney Blue Sox New South Wales Patriots retirement baseball team from ABL new abl Australian baseball league since 2010
