= Claxton Shield =

Major Australian baseball tournament and its trophy

- Most recent season or competition: 2024-25 Australian Baseball League season
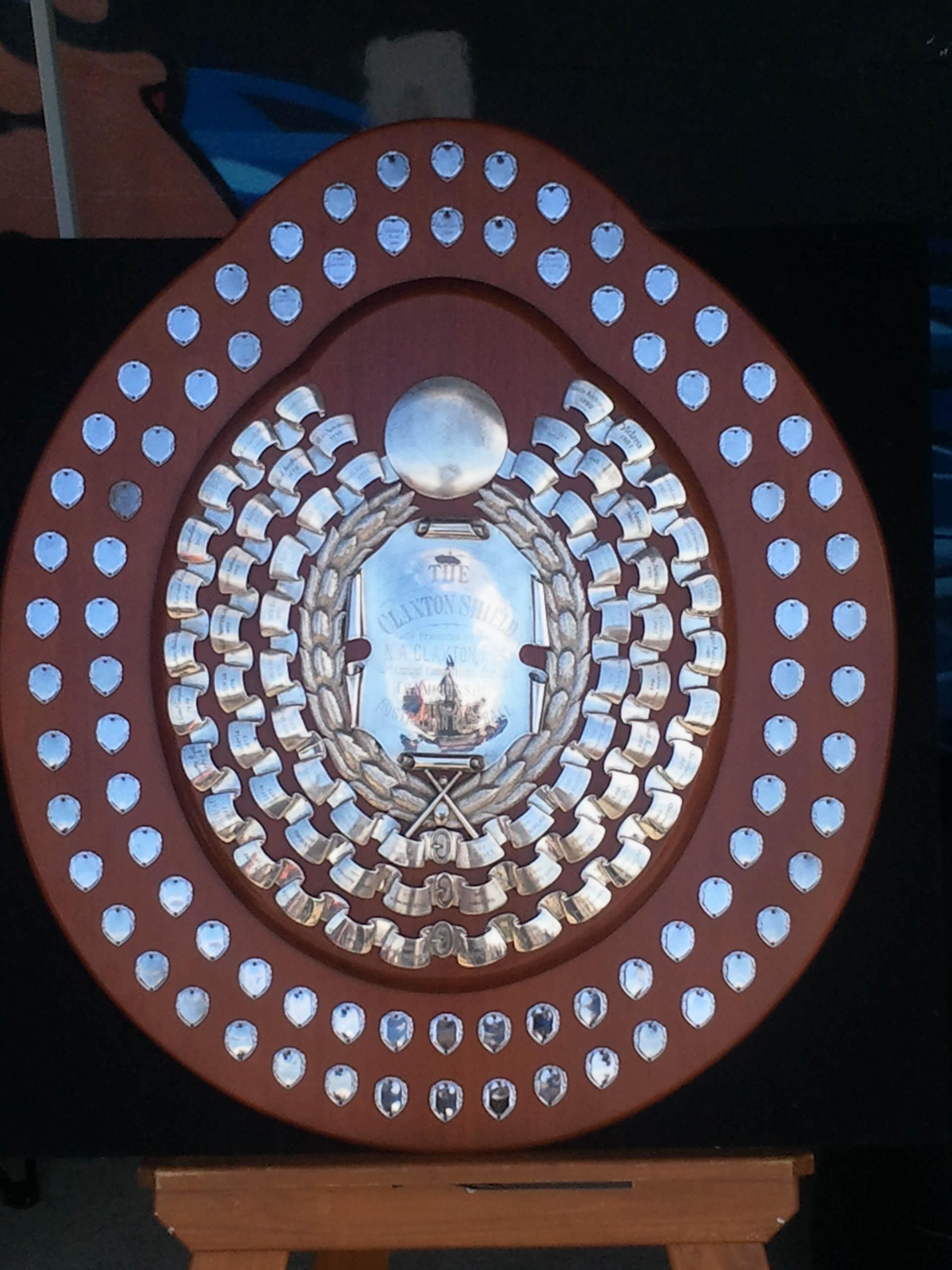
- The Claxton Shield
- Sport: Baseball
- Founded: 1934
- First season: 1934
- No. of teams: 6
- Country: Australia
- Continent: Australia
- Most recent champions: Adelaide Giants (ABL 2025–26, 3rd title)
- Most titles: Victoria Aces (23 titles)
- Related competitions: Australian Baseball League; ABL (1989–1999) & IBLA
- Website: Australian Baseball League

The Claxton Shield was the name of the premier baseball competition in Australia held between state-based teams, as well as the name of the trophy awarded to the champion team. From the summer of 1989–90 until 2001–02, and again since 2010–11, the tournament was replaced by one of three other competitions: the original Australian Baseball League (ABL), the International Baseball League of Australia (IBLA), and since the 2010–11 season the new ABL. Despite other competitions being held in place of the Claxton Shield, the physical trophy has remained the award for the winning teams. Though city-based teams have competed for the Claxton Shield in some seasons, the name engraved on the shield is that of the winning state; for the 2010–11 ABL season won by the Perth Heat, "West Australia 2011" was engraved.

The Victoria Aces were the last team to win the shield under the Claxton Shield format, having won the 2010 tournament by defeating South Australia two games to nil in the final series. It was the eighteenth time the Aces had won the shield, and the twenty-second time it had been won by a Victorian team—the most by any state—including three times by the Waverley / Melbourne Reds and once by the Melbourne Monarchs.

The Canberra Cavalry currently hold the shield after overcoming the Perth Heat in the 2024-25 Australian Baseball League Championship Series. It was the Canberra Cavalry's second ABL title.

== History ==
There had been interstate baseball tournaments held prior to the start of the Claxton Shield. Prior to the federation of Australia, an inter-colonial series was held in Melbourne in 1890 between Victoria and South Australia at the East Melbourne Cricket Ground. South Australia were the eventual winners of the series, winning two games to one. New South Wales and Victoria started holding an annual series between themselves in 1900, that was only called off for a smallpox outbreak in 1913, but would not return until 1919 because of World War I. The first "national" tournament was held in Hobart in 1910, won by New South Wales defeating Victoria and hosts Tasmania. New South Wales repeated the feat in 1912 in Melbourne when they won again, this time with the addition of South Australia. None were held regularly though, and they did not always involve all baseball–playing states.

=== Establishment ===
In 1913 and in the wake of national tournaments having already been played, the Australian Baseball Council was formed by representatives of the state controlling bodies. Because of conflict between the north and south Tasmanian baseball community, they were not among the states on the council, which included New South Wales, South Australia and Victoria. Further national tournaments were not organised though, until the efforts of Norrie Claxton in 1934. Claxton, who had played for South Australia in both cricket and baseball, and was a patron of the South Australia Baseball Association, donated a shield to be awarded to the winners of the annual carnival, with the intention of permanently awarding the shield to the first team to win three consecutive tournaments, and was named the Claxton Shield.

The first tournament was held in 1934, with matches played at the Adelaide Oval and Hindmarsh Oval in Adelaide. The hosts South Australia won the tournament, and would go on to win the next two editions as well. At this point, all participating states agreed that it should be a perpetual shield awarded to the winner each year. In 1936, the Western Australia Baseball League applied to join the other states in competing for that year's tournament in Sydney. However their request came too late, as the arrangements had already been confirmed. A month after the tournament, Western Australia hosted Victoria in Perth for a three-game series as a form of preparation for their entry in the 1937 tournament in Adelaide. In a repeat of circumstances, the Queensland Baseball Association applied to send a team to the 1937 tournament, but as had been the case with Western Australia their application was too late. Queensland would make their Claxton Shield debut in the 1939 tournament in Melbourne.

=== Post WWII ===
The early part of the decade was interrupted by World War II, however the post war years provided many new players to the competition and brought Australian baseball to new heights. The Victoria Aces began their rise to the dominance of Claxton Shield by achieving their first hat-trick of titles between 1947 and 1949.

In 1950, the Claxton Shield was restored to a national competition after the Queensland Rams returned to the competition after a four-year absence. It was a decade of close competition with each capital city holding at least one series during the decade. In 1952, Western Australia won their first title.

The series in 1961 marked an expansion in the competition as all teams played each other twice that year. In 1962, the longstanding tradition of hosting the event in August was broken when host Adelaide scheduled the series in October, perhaps the first step in a long march to create the sport's eventual move in Australia to the summer season. Behind starting pitcher Neil Page, South Australian teams dominated the decade, winning six championships. The decade also marked the introduction of the Helm's Award, which is presented to the Claxton Shield's MVP every year.

South Australia's decade may well have been the 1960s, but the 1970s belonged to Western Australia who captured a title in 1975 and a hattrick from 1977 to 1979.

The era saw a new dimension of Claxton Shield with corporate involvement and interstate rivalries becoming strong. It also saw the expansion of the competition to six teams, with the admittance of the Northern Territory between 1981 and 1988. After a 42-year drought, the Queensland Rams won their first national title in 1982 before capturing two others in 1983 and 1987. The 1980s saw the likes of such names as Tony Adamson, Dave Nilsson, Graeme Lloyd, Adrian Meagher and Phil Dale. New South Wales Patriots won the last championship in 1988 before the introduction of the Australian Baseball League.

=== Australian Baseball League ===
After the 1988 Claxton Shield and the Australian Baseball League was formed to take over from the traditional Claxton Shield, the first game was between Perth Heat and Adelaide Giants at Parry Field in Perth 27 October 1989 with the Giants winning 8–5.

The league ran for 10 seasons before being bought out by Dave Nilsson and his company Nilcorp due to the declining financial state of the league.

=== International Baseball League of Australia ===
In late 1999 Australian baseball player David Nilsson purchased the rights to the Australian Baseball League for A$5,000,000. Nilsson, who with Glenn Partridge had the vision of creating the International Baseball League of Australia, ran the next 3 Claxton Shields each using a different format.

The first format used was the most similar to the former Australian Baseball League, 6 teams divided into 2 divisions, southern and northern division playing home and away games with a total of 17 games, followed by a best of 3 division championship with the winner of each division meeting in the best of 3 championship series to decide the Claxton Shield champion and IBLA champion.

The second format was a four-team competition played exclusively on the Gold Coast at Palm Meadows Baseball Stadium. Teams involved in this championship were 3 composite teams; IBLA Australia, IBLA Internationals, MLB All-Stars and the 4th team was the Taiwanese national team. A cut-throat finals system was used in this championship with a 3rd place play-off.

The third and final format was run jointly with the Australian Baseball Federation, The championship was held in Melbourne at the Melbourne Ballpark and used a more traditional Claxton Shield format, 6 teams over 1 week playing each other once again using a cut-throat finals system.

=== Return to Claxton Shield ===
The "State vs State" format of Claxton Shield returned in 2002 during the IBLA season. It then truly became the top tier baseball competition in Australia again in 2003 when the IBLA folded. The decade has brought close to a hundred young Australians playing baseball in Major League Baseball and Japan, most of who return home to showcase their talents to local fans.

The 2004 Olympic Games signalled a coming of age for Australian baseball when the Australian national baseball team won silver medals. More recently, the 2008 series saw the return of a "home & away" format so that the game can be showcased nationwide.

== Season structure ==
The Claxton Shield has followed numerous formats over the years. The original format saw a round-robin tournament used, with each of the three participating teams playing each other once over the course of a week. The tournament would be hosted in a single city, though in some cases multiple grounds were used for individual games, the team with the most wins being declared the winner. With the expansion to four teams in 1937, the addition of a final was made, with the top two teams playing in a championship game. Though there were many variations in the fine details from year to year, particularly when a team was added or removed from the competition, the basic concept of a round-robin followed by a final was continued through to the final Claxton Shield before the start of the Australian Baseball League in 1988. When the International Baseball League of Australia collapsed and the Claxton Shield resumed in its own right in 2003, the original format was continued.

The 2008 Claxton Shield saw a new format for the tournament. A home and away season was introduced, splitting the six participating teams into two divisions of three teams each. The teams played within their own divisions, meeting both other teams twice for a three-game series: one series at home, one away. The division leaders then met in a best of three final series for the championship.

2009 marked the 75th anniversary of the inaugural Claxton Shield, and so a mix of old and new was used. A showcase round was held in Sydney, where each team met each other team once. After this, each team met each other once again for a three-game series on a home and away basis, much the same as the previous season. The finals series was expanded to allow three teams to reach the playoffs. The second and third placed teams met in a best of three series, the winner of which met the first placed team.

The 2010 season eliminated the showcase round, and used a double round-robin format: each team met each other team twice—once at home, once away—each time for a three-game series, resulting in each team playing 24 games over ten rounds before the finals series, the most for any Claxton Shield season. The three team playoff structure was kept. This season structure was seen as a template for the relaunch of the Australian Baseball League the following season: the only likely changes being the expansion to six teams meaning no bye rounds for any teams, and the possible change from a three-game series each round to a four-game series.

== See also ==
- Baseball Australia Diamond Awards
- Baseball Australia Hall of Fame
- Baseball awards#Australia
- Australia Women's Championships (baseball)

== Bibliography ==
- Clark, Joe (2003). A History of Australian Baseball: Time and Game. Lincoln, NE, United States: University of Nebraska Press. ISBN 0-8032-6440-2.
