= Harvey brothers =

Australian cricketers

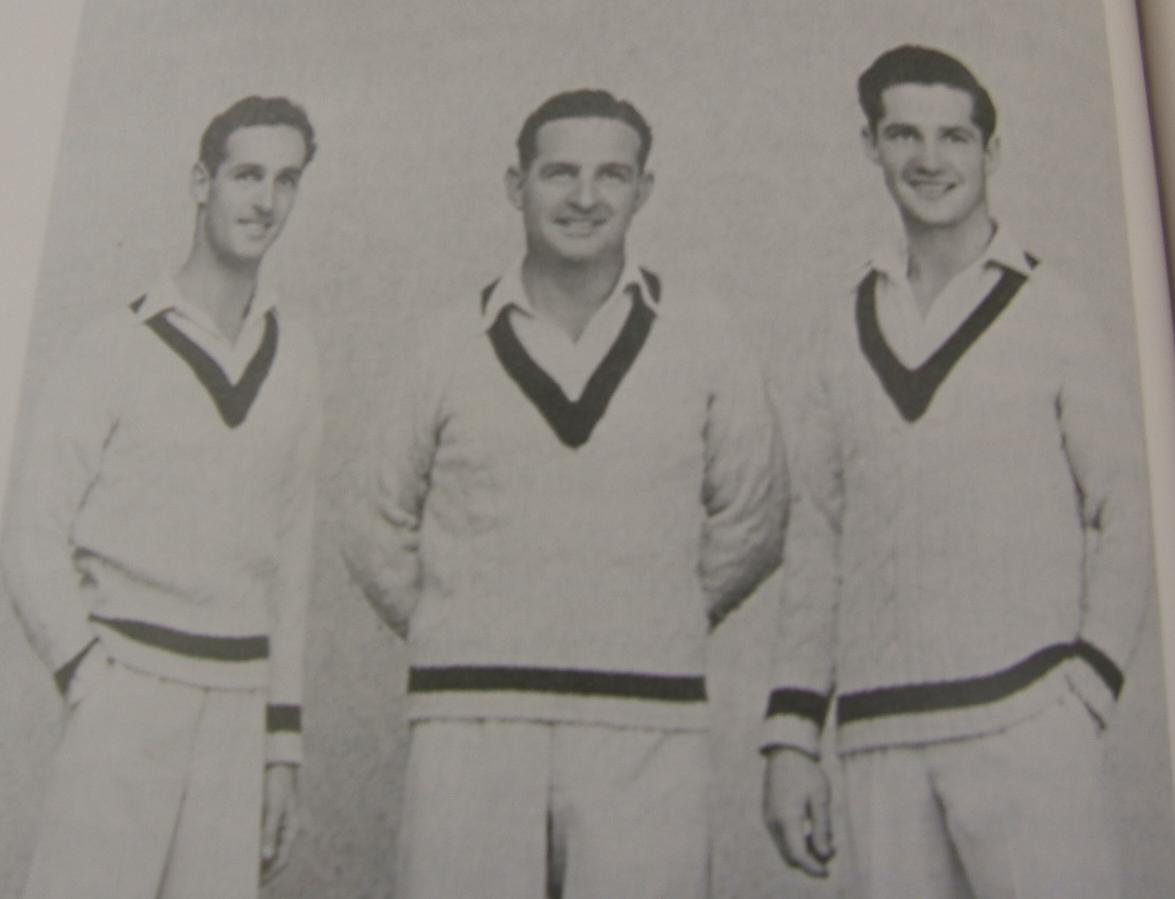
At one point during the 1947–48 season, Ray, Merv and Neil Harvey were all members of the Victorian team.

The Harvey brothers are six siblings from Victoria, Australia, known primarily for their success in the sport of cricket between the mid-1930s and the early 1960s. The sons of Horace and Elsie Harvey, in chronological order, they are Merv (1918–1995), Clarence (aka "Mick"); 1921–2016), Harold (b. 1923), Ray (1926-2011), Neil (b. 1928) and Brian (1932–1969). All six were long-serving members of the Fitzroy Cricket Club (now Fitzroy Doncaster), which played in Melbourne's district cricket competition.

Neil Harvey represented Australia in 79 Test matches between 1948 and 1963. He was Australia's most prolific batsman during the post-war era, served as vice-captain of Australia in the last five years of his career and regarded by Wisden as the leading fielder in the world during his career. At the time of his retirement, he held the record for the most Test appearances by an Australian and was the country's second-highest run scorer and century-maker, behind Don Bradman. He was selected in the Australian Cricket Board's Team of the Century and inducted into the Australian Cricket Hall of Fame. He was an inaugural inductee into the ICC Cricket Hall of Fame. The family's eldest son, Merv, played one Test for Australia in 1946–47 after losing his best years to World War II and his grandson Robert Harvey was one of the elite Australian rules footballers of the last twenty years, twice winning the Australian Football League's Brownlow Medal for the best and fairest player of the season and being voted the Most Valuable Player in the competition by his peers in 1997.

Along with their better-known brothers, Mick and Ray played first-class cricket for Victoria, although the former moved to Queensland after one season for his native state due to a lack of opportunities. Neither approached the level of success of Neil or Merv and often found themselves dropped, although Ray was a consistent player for Victoria for two seasons in the 1950s and came close to national selection. Mick's daughter, Pauline Harvey-Short, represented Australia in softball and her daughter, Kirby Short, plays for the Queensland women's cricket team. After his playing career ended, Mick became a Test cricket umpire, officiating in two matches. The two other brothers, Brian and Harold, played for Fitzroy in district cricket. Apart from Harold, all of the brothers represented Victoria at baseball.

While the brothers played together for Fitzroy on a regular basis, they only played first-class cricket together occasionally, mainly due to a lack of form and differences in age. Merv debuted for Victoria before the war, and Neil joined him in 1946–47. Ray followed in subsequent season, and the trio played in two matches together for their state. However, there were no occasions after this when more than two played together in the same match and such occurrences became more sporadic after this as Merv was dropped, while Neil was often away playing for Australia. Mick made his debut in 1948–49, but left Victoria at the end of the season after being unable to hold his position in the team, while Ray often struggled to gain regular selection except when Neil and the other Test players were representing Australia. Ray had a strong end to the 1952–53 season and was selected for all the matches in the following two seasons alongside Neil, but was then dropped.

== Early years ==
Born at Kapunda, South Australia, Horace "Horry" Harvey moved to Broken Hill where he worked for BHP, driving horse-drawn trailers. In 1914, he married Elsie May Bitmead and their first two children, daughter Rita and son Mervyn, were born in the mining town. The family relocated to Newcastle, a mining town and harbour in New South Wales, and had two more sons, Clarence (always known as "Mick", as he was born on Saint Patrick's Day) and Harold. In 1926, the Harveys shifted to the inner-Melbourne suburb of Fitzroy, a staunchly working-class, industrial area. During their relocation, Ray was born in Sydney. Horace secured a job at the confectionery company Life Savers, located next door to their house at 198 Argyle Street. The 19th century two-storey house was owned by the firm and was used as lodgings for the workers' families. It no longer exists, having been demolished to make way for a textile factory. The two youngest sons Neil and Brian were born in Fitzroy.

The Cornish-descended Horry raised his family as strict Methodists, disallowing gambling, alcohol, tobacco and profanity in his household. An ardent cricketer during his years in New South Wales, he was good enough to hit 196 runs during a match in Newcastle, and encouraged his children to play sport. He played for the Rita Social Club after moving to Fitzroy, while his wife kept score. His daughter was also a scorer for the club. As recreational facilities and grass ovals were sparse in densely populated Fitzroy, the boys took to playing cricket in a cobblestone laneway between their terraced house. Here they played cricket with a tennis ball, home made cricket bat and a kerosene tin for a wicket.

They were usually joined by other local children, two of whom became elite sportsmen: Allan Ruthven (an Australian rules footballer) and Harold Shillinglaw (both an Australian rules footballer and first-class cricketer)—the group also played Australian rules football, kicking around rolled up cardboard and newspaper. Much of the batting skill displayed by the Harvey brothers has been attributed to these games played on the unpredictable bounce of the bumpy laneway. The surface also had a V-shaped slope inwards towards the centre of the lane, causing balls to deviate sideways after bouncing.

As the laneway meant that the playing area was long and narrow, the young boys also had to learn to play the ball straight in accordance with orthodox cricket technique. The Harveys played another form of cricket in their concreted backyard (using a marble instead of a ball) that sharpened their reflexes, and a miniature bat. All were right-handed batsmen with the exception of Neil. All the siblings attended the nearby George Street State School and, one by one, the brothers joined the Fitzroy Cricket Club as they reached their early teens. The club had a program whereby they gave a medal to local schools to award to their best cricketer in their ranks, who would then be given access to all of the club's facilities. The Harvey brothers were all recipients of the medal. At Fitzroy, they came under the influence of former Victorian all-rounder Arthur Liddicut and the club's veteran captain Joe Plant. The Harveys had no formal coaching, and their father, a regular presence at the club, chose to stay in the background as their respective careers developed. Horace did not advise his sons on how to bat, allowing them to formulate their own style and technique, something Neil later regarded as beneficial. According to the Harvey brothers, it was their mother who was vocal and extroverted, in contrast to their reserved father. The boys who failed to score runs were given kitchen duty, and according to them, their parents never showed favouritism.

During the winter, they played for the Fitzroy Baseball Club, often competing in matches played as curtain raisers to the elite Australian rules football competition, the Victorian Football League. Saturday night entertainment for the family typically consisted of dinner after the day's cricket for Fitzroy, and Plant, Liddicut and other club personnel were often invited. Under the influence of Plant and Liddicut, the boys were taught to adopt an aggressive approach, using fast feet movement to attack spin bowling in particular. In 1942–43, Neil broke into Fitzroy's First XI, joining his older brothers Merv, Mick, and Ray. During that season, the family held down the first four batting positions for Fitzroy; Merv and Mick opened the batting and Ray and Neil came in after them. The four brothers entered the Victorian team in the 1940s; Merv in 1940–41, Neil in 1946–47, and Ray and Mick in successive seasons thereafter.

== Neil Harvey ==
Harvey represented the Australian cricket team between early 1948 and early 1963. He was the vice captain of the team from 1957 until his retirement. An attacking left-handed batsman, sharp fielder and occasional off-spin bowler, Harvey was the senior batsman in the Australian team for much of the 1950s and was regarded by Wisden as the finest fielder of his era. Harvey followed his elder brother Merv in making his Test debut in January 1948, aged 19 and three months. In his second match, he became the youngest Australian to score a Test century, a record that as of July 2010, still stands. He was then part of The Invincibles of Don Bradman who toured England without defeat and were acclaimed as one of the finest teams in history; Harvey was the youngest player in the team and scored a century on his Ashes debut in the Fourth Test at Headingley. The opening period of his Australian career was particularly fruitful, scoring six centuries in his first thirteen Test innings, at the end of which he averaged over 100. As Bradman's team broke up in the 1950s due to retirements, Harvey became Australia's senior batsman, and was named as one of the Wisden Cricketers of the Year in 1954. In 1957 he was passed over for the captaincy and was named as the deputy of Ian Craig who had played just six matches as Australia sought to rebuild the team with a youth policy. The following season, Craig had fallen ill, but Harvey moved interstate and Richie Benaud was promoted to the captaincy ahead of him as Benaud was higher in the New South Wales hierarchy. Harvey continued as vice-captain until the end of his career, and led the team in only one Test. In the Second Test at Lord's in 1961 when Benaud was injured, Harvey led the team in the "Battle of the Ridge", a match played on a surface with a visible ridge that caused erratic bounce, grinding out a hard-fought victory. When Harvey retired, only Bradman, generally deemed as the finest batsman in history, had scored more runs or centuries for Australia. Harvey was best known for his extravagant footwork and flamboyant strokeplay. In retirement, he became a national selector for twelve years but in recent times is best known for his strident criticism of modern cricket. He was inducted into the Australian Cricket Hall of Fame in 2000, and also selected in the Australian Cricket Board's Test Team of the Century. In 2009, Harvey was one of the 55 inaugural inductees into the ICC Cricket Hall of Fame. In 102 First XI matches for Fitzroy, he made 4,044 runs at an average of 37.10, the highest average in the family.

== Merv Harvey ==
Described by his younger brother Neil as the "best cricketer of us all", Merv was an attacking opening batsman, strong on the drive and fond of hooking fast bowling. He graduated to Fitzroy's first XI in 1933-34 and made his first-class debut for Victoria against Queensland at the Gabba in 1940–41. In the next match, he made an impression on cricket observers by scoring 70 in an hour at the SCG against New South Wales, whose bowling line-up included Bill O'Reilly. Service in the Royal Australian Air Force as an airframe fitter during World War II severely interrupted his cricket career.

After the war, he resumed with Victoria, but faced a lot of competition for a place as an opening batsman in the Australian team. He played his only Test in the 1946-47 Ashes series at the Adelaide Oval, filling in for the injured Sid Barnes. Scoring 12 and 31, he partnered Arthur Morris in a second innings opening stand of 116. After a further two first-class seasons, Harvey retired after being dropped from Victoria's first-choice team. He ended with a record of 1,147 first-class runs at 38.23 in 22 matches. This included three centuries, and he captained Victoria five times, winning one match—the rest were drawn. His career highlight was an innings of 136 in December 1946 against New South Wales, when he hooked a bouncer from Ray Lindwall into the Melbourne Cricket Ground public bar and featured in a partnership of 271 with Keith Miller. His highest score was 163 against South Australia at Adelaide. Harvey continued playing for Fitzroy until 1954–55, and he finished with 6,654 runs at an average of 29.31 in 207 First XI matches for the club.

=== Anthony and Robert Harvey ===
Merv's grandson Robert Harvey made the Victorian Under-19 cricket team, but decided to focus on Australian rules football, becoming one of the most successful players of his generation. He made his AFL debut for St Kilda Football Club in 1988 and played 21 seasons before retiring at the end of 2008 as the most capped current player.

A midfielder, he was a member of the All-Australian team eight times and won the Brownlow Medal twice, in 1997 and 1998, for the best and fairest player in the Australian Football League. In addition, he was voted the AFL's Most Valuable Player in 1997 by his peers and also won the Trevor Barker Award for St Kilda's best and fairest four times. He played in one grand final, in 1997, when the Saints lost to the Adelaide Crows. His brother, Anthony, played for St Kilda and captained Norwood to victory in the 1997 SANFL Grand Final.

== Mick Harvey ==
A printer by trade, Clarence Edgar "Mick" Harvey played in the Fitzroy first XI in 1938–39, then served as an infantryman in the Second Australian Imperial Force during World War II. A veteran of Kokoda, he resumed with Fitzroy at the war's end and made enough runs to be selected for Victoria's first three Sheffield Shield matches of the 1948–49 season. However, he failed to pass 33 in six innings as an opening batsman and was dropped from the team. Moving to Brisbane the following season, Harvey joined the Toombul grade club and made his first-class debut for Queensland. Noted for his sound defence, he was a patient and dogged batsman, in contrast to the exciting styles of brothers Merv, Ray and Neil.

In 1950–51, he hit 490 runs at an average of 37.69, including 100 not out against New South Wales at the Sydney Cricket Ground. However, he struggled the following season and was dropped, and did not play a single first-class match in 1952–53. His only other first-class centuries came in 1953–54: 102 against South Australia and 111 against Western Australia. He struggled in the following two summers and could not hold a consistent position in the team, and retired. Altogether, he made 1,716 first-class runs (mostly as an opener) in 37 matches at an average of 27.23. A regular choice for the Queensland baseball team, Harvey later turned to cricket umpiring. His initial first-class match as an umpire was in 1974-75 and he stood in two Tests from 1979 to 1980 after many players and officials left for the breakaway World Series Cricket. He stood in six One Day Internationals including one of the finals of the inaugural World Series Cup. In all, he officiated in 31 first-class and 13 List A matches.

In 90 First XI matches for Fitzroy, Mick Harvey scored 2,601 runs at an average of 30.24. His daughter, Pauline Harvey-Short, represented Australia at softball, and later became a sports administrator; her daughter, Kirby Short, played cricket for and captained the Queensland women's team and Brisbane Heat.

== Ray Harvey ==
Raymond Harvey played 40 matches for Victoria. He was an attacking and talented batsman, but failed to reach international standards and only managed to hold down a regular position in the Victorian team in two seasons in the 1950s. This failure to match the standards set by his Test-capped brothers was often attributed to a lack of single-mindedness and hunger.

Harvey made his first-class debut in 1947–48, but performed poorly, and did not play a match in the following summer, and for the two subsequent seasons, he played in only three games. In 1951-52 he made five appearances, gaining selection only when Victoria's Test players were busy representing Australia. The following season, he broke through for his maiden first-class century, having never previously passed 50.

Having broken through at the end of the preceding summer, Harvey played his first full season for Victoria in 1953–54. He scored two centuries and five half-centuries against full-strength teams from other states. He was hailed as the best player outside the Australian Test team, and at the start of the following season, Harvey was included in an Australian XI for a match against the touring England team for a Test trial match. However, rain curtailed the match and turned the playing surface into a sticky wicket hostile to batting. Harvey made only seven in his solitary innings. He played in all of Victoria's matches for the season, but his form slumped and he was overlooked for state selection until 1958–59, when he regained his position and made 97 and 86 in consecutive innings. However, the following season, he made only sporadic appearances and was dropped after some low scores. He shone mainly for Fitzroy; his club first-grade records for the most career runs and centuries, and the most runs in a season, still stand. He ended his first-grade career in 1960–61 with 19 centuries and 9,146 runs at an average of 36.15 from 247 matches.

== Harold and Brian Harvey ==
Due to commitments during the war, the fourth of the brothers, Harold Lindsay Harvey was unable to pursue a cricket career. He played mainly Second XI cricket at Fitzroy, but did play in the First XI during the war. A fitter and turner, Harold Harvey enlisted on 19 April 1945 and was discharged on 20 January 1947 with the rank of sergeant. He served with the Second Australian Imperial Force in Bougainville in New Guinea and played 15 First XI matches for Fitzroy from 1942–43 to 1949–50, as a wicketkeeper-batsman, scoring 237 runs at an average of 14.81.

Brian Clifford Harvey, a Victorian representative at baseball, was a useful cricketer at club level, spending almost a decade in the Fitzroy First XI until 1961–62. An electrician, he was electrocuted in 1969 at the age of 37 while working for the State Electricity Commission. In 111 First XI matches for Fitzroy, he made 2,503 runs at 21.57.

Between them, the Harvey brothers totalled 25,185 runs in 772 appearances for the Fitzroy Cricket Club. Over time, their numbers in the ranks began to diminish. In 1949–50, Mick moved to Queensland while Harold was dropped from his position in the Fitzroy First XI. Merv retired after 1954-55 and Neil moved to New South Wales after 1956–57. Ray retired from the First XI at the end of 1960–61 and Brian the year after. In 1962–63, the club played their first season for 30 years without a Harvey in the team. At first-class level, the family's contribution is 26,532 in 405 appearances, with 7,964 coming for Victoria.

== First-class team-mates ==
Although the four brothers all played for Victoria, there was not a great deal of overlap in their careers at first-class level, due to a combination of age, interstate moves, international duty and omissions from the team. The most Harveys in one first-class team occurred twice in 1947–48, when Merv, Ray and Neil all played for Victoria in successive Shield matches.

The first time that more than one of the brothers played for Victoria together came in 1946–47, after Neil was selected to play for the state against Tasmania. At the time, a second-string team was used to play Tasmania—who were not in the Sheffield Shield—in two first-class matches, while the strongest team played in the regular interstate competition. Neil struck a century in the second match against Tasmania, and was called into the Victorian team to play against New South Wales in a Sheffield Shield match at the SCG, and he played alongside Merv for their state's three remaining matches of the season. However, the brothers never batted together in these three matches. Merv opened the batting and was always out before Neil came in, usually at No. 6 upon the fall of the fourth wicket. Merv captained at first-class level for the first time in the last match, a draw against South Australia that was severely shortened by rain.

Neil and Merv retained their positions for Victoria's first two matches of the 1947–48 season, against India and South Australia respectively. Again, Merv was out before Neil came in, so they did not bat together. The brotherly selection pairing was broken up for Victoria's next match, as Neil was rewarded with selection for an Australian XI for a Test trial match against the Indians, while Merv continued to represent the state. Neil returned to the Victorian team for the match against New South Wales at the SCG the following week, and Ray was selected to make his first-class debut, so three Harveys were in the state team for the first time. Merv opened, while Neil and Ray batted at Nos. 4 and 7 respectively. Victoria batted first and the brothers again did not form any partnerships. Merv opened and made 45 before being dismissed at 2/99, prompting Neil's entrance to replace him at the crease. Neil then top-scored with 61 before falling at 4/200, and Ray then came in at 5/208 to make 43. Victoria ended with 331 and the Harvey brothers had scored almost half the runs. New South Wales were forced to follow on, and Victoria were set 51 for victory. After the fall of Fred Freer at 1/24, captain Lindsay Hassett elevated Ray to No. 3, allowing two Harveys to bat together for the first time at first-class level. Ray and Merv put on an unbeaten partnership of 27 to take Victoria to a nine-wicket win. Merv and Ray ended unbeaten on 12 and 22 respectively.

The trio then proceeded to play together in the next match against Western Australia two weeks later and Merv captained the team as Hassett was away on Test duty. Victoria batted first and Neil came in to join Merv with the score at 2/102, and the pair added 173 together before Neil fell for 94. One run later, Merv was out for 141; later, Ray made only 1. Victoria ended on 370 and Western Australia took a 59-run lead. In the second innings, Merv, Neil and Ray made 6, 41 and 15 respectively, never batting together as the match was drawn after Merv declared the innings at 9/304, setting Western Australia a target of 246 for victory. The hosts reached 5/205 and Victoria avoided defeat.

After this match, Neil was called into the Australian Test team, so only Ray and Merv played in Victoria's next match against New South Wales. Merv—again captaining the side—made a duck and was out before Ray came in, in Victoria's only innings of the match and was not selected for the remainder of the season. After this, Ray and Neil played together for Victoria on two occasions in the second half of the season when the latter did not have a match for Australia. In the first match, against New South Wales, the two batted in partnership for the first time for their state. Ray came in at 5/53 to join Neil and he fell for 9 to leave the score at 6/64 as Victoria collapsed to be all out for 130. In the second innings, Ray joined Neil with the score at 5/266 and the latter fell at 6/292, ending a 26-run partnership. The pair did not bat together in the second match against South Australia as Neil was out before Ray came in on both occasions. The 1947-48 was the most productive for the Harveys as a combination for Victoria until Ray played a full season in 1953-54 together with Neil.

In 1948–49, Ray, who had made only 190 runs at an average of 21.11 in his debut season, was not selected for a single match, while Merv's only first-class outings were two matches for a second-choice team against Tasmania while the leading players were participating in Shield fixtures at the same time. Mick was selected as an opener for Victoria's first three Shield matches, and played with Neil in these matches. However, he struggled and made only 91 runs at 15.16 and was then dropped. In six innings, the two brothers batted together only twice, even though they batted in successive batting positions; Mick's poor form meant he was usually the first batsman out, bringing his younger brother to the crease. In the first match of the season, against Queensland, Mick was the first wicket to fall on each occasion. In the second match, the brothers shared partnerships. In the first innings, Neil came in at 1/8 and the Harveys put on 39 runs before Merv was out. The second innings proceeded similarly as Neil came in at 1/31 and 40 runs were added before the older Harvey fell. In the third match of the season, Mick was out for 4 and 12 before Neil came in and was subsequently dropped.

In 1949–50, none of the Harveys played together at first-class level; Merv had retired, Mick had moved to Queensland looking for more opportunities, while Neil was in South Africa with the Australian team. Ray and Mick played in one match each for the season, but not against the other. In 1950–51, Ray was selected in two matches for Victoria, both when Neil and the other Test players were competing against England. Both of these were against Tasmania, so he did not meet Mick. However, there were no international fixtures coinciding with Victoria's two matches with Queensland, and Neil met Mick in both of these matches. In 1951–52, Ray was able to gain selection more regularly for Victoria. All of these came when Neil and the other Test players were playing for Australia; when they available for Victoria, Ray was not selected. Ray played in both of Victoria's matches against Queensland, for whom Mick played in the first match.

In 1952–53 Ray only managed selection in the last three matches of the season, and played alongside Neil in the last two fixtures, against South Africa and Western Australia. The brothers had previously had little success in partnerships together for Victoria and in the match against South Africa, Neil came in to join Ray—who was playing as an opener—with the score at 2/21. The pair put on 96 runs. The Victorians drew the match and the brothers did not bat together in the second innings. In the match against South Australia, Neil joined his brother at 1/118 and the Harveys again narrowly missed a century partnership, as Ray fell at 2/211 for 121. Later, Neil was out for 95, missing out on another milestone. Mick was not selected for his adopted state in any fixture for the entire season and did not meet his brothers.

In 1953–54, Ray had his most effective season and played in all seven of Victoria's Shield matches, even though there were no Test matches for the summer, meaning that all the national team members were available for state selection for the whole season. He played the entire season alongside Neil, and the pair encountered Mick in both matches against Queensland. During the summer, Neil typically batted at No. 3, and Ray usually succeeded him. Despite this, they batted together only four times in 13 innings, as Neil was usually out first. Their first partnership came in the first innings of the second match of the season, against New South Wales. It was brief; Ray came in at 2/93 and scored two runs before falling at 3/97. They then batted together on New Year's Day in the first innings of the next match against South Australia. Ray came in to join Neil after the Victorians had slumped to be 2/5, and after twice coming close to century partnerships for their state in the past, the brothers put on 150 before Neil was out for 88 to leave the score at 3/165. Ray went on to make 110. In the following match against Queensland, Ray came in with the score at 2/65 and put on 82 with his brother before he was out for 50. Their only other partnership of the season amounted to 36 runs in the second innings of the return match against New South Wales; Neil was out for 47 as Ray guided the Victorians to their target with five wickets in hand, scoring 106 not out himself. Ray and Neil were also selected for the testimonial match for retiring Australian captain Lindsay Hassett. Neil played for Hassett's XI while Ray was on the opposition team captained by Arthur Morris.

At the start of the 1954–55 season, along with Neil, Ray was called into an Australian XI for a Test trial against Len Hutton's touring English team, the closest that two Harveys came to playing in a Test for Australia together. Ray did not make an impact in the match, scoring only seven in his solitary innings, and was not selected for Australian duty. He came in at No. 4 after the dismissal of his brother. Ray was selected for all six of Victoria's matches and played in all of these matches alongside Neil, as the domestic season was shortened and there were no scheduling clashes between the Tests and the domestic matches. Mick also played in all of Queensland's matches, and three brothers met in their states' only meeting for the season.

Ray and Neil did not bat together in the first match, before adding 24 for the second wicket in the second innings of the following match against England. They did not bat together in the third match of the season, against New South Wales, as Ray, who was batting one position ahead of Neil, was out first in both innings. In the return match that followed, the brothers had brief partnerships of two and ten runs, Ray being dismissed soon after Neil joined him at the crease. These brief stands continued in the first innings of the match against Queensland, as Ray fell after a six-run partnership. In the second innings, the pair narrowly missed out on a century partnership. Neil came in at 1/17 to join Ray, who was opening in the match, and they took the score to 1/117 before Neil was out for 66. In the final match of the season against the Marylebone Cricket Club, Ray was the first wicket to fall in the innings and he did not bat with Neil.

In 1955–56, Ray was overlooked and spent four years out of first-class cricket, and he never played alongside Neil again at first-class level. Neil played in all of Victoria's matches, and Mick played in Queensland's first six matches before being dropped for the second and final match against Victoria. In 1956–57, Mick played in two matches for Queensland earlier in the season before being dropped and retiring; neither were against Victoria, so none of the brothers played together in one match. Ray was recalled to the Victorian team in the latter half of the 1958–59 season. By this time, Neil had moved to New South Wales for employment reasons, and played each other late in the season. The Harvey brothers never played together or against one another again at first-class level. In 1959–60, Neil was in the Indian subcontinent representing Australia as Ray played his final first-class season before retiring.
