= Ray Harvey =

Australian cricketer (1926–2011)

Personal information
- Full name: Raymond Harvey
- Born: 3 January 1926; Sydney, New South Wales, Australia
- Died: 6 January 2011 (aged 85); Melbourne, Victoria, Australia
- Batting: Right-handed
- Bowling: Right-arm leg spin
- Role: Middle-order batsman
- Relatives: Merv Harvey (brother); Mick Harvey (brother); Neil Harvey (brother)

Domestic team information
- Years: Team
- 1947/48–1959/60: Victoria

Career statistics
Competition	First-class
Matches	40
Runs scored	1,970
Batting average	30.78
100s/50s	3/7
Top score	121
Balls bowled	543
Wickets	5
Bowling average	65.20
5 wickets in innings	0
10 wickets in match	0
Best bowling	3/26
Catches/stumpings	44/–
- Source: CricketArchive, 18 June 2010

Raymond Harvey (3 January 1926 – 6 January 2011) was an Australian former first-class cricketer who played for Victoria in the 1940s and 1950s. He was the brother of Australian Test batsmen Merv and Neil and first-class cricketer and umpire Mick Harvey. Ray Harvey was an attacking and talented batsman but failed to reach international standards and only managed to hold down a regular position in the Victorian team in two seasons in the 1950s. This failure to match the standards set by his Test-capped brothers was often attributed to a lack of single-mindedness and hunger.

Harvey was born into a working-class, devoutly Methodist family. His father was a keen amateur cricketer and an instilled a love of the game in his six sons, all of whom played for Fitzroy in Victorian Premier Cricket. Harvey made his first class debut in the middle of the 1947–48 season, and played his first two matches for Victoria alongside his more decorated brothers Merv and Neil. However, he performed poorly and did not play a match in the following summer and for the two subsequent seasons, he played in only three games but contributed little to his team's cause. In 1951–52 he made five appearances, gaining selection only when Victoria's Test players were busy representing Australia. The following season, he gained selection for the last three matches and broke through for his maiden first-class century, having never previously passed 50.

Having broken through at the end of the preceding summer, Harvey played his first full season for Victoria in 1953–54, despite the availability of the Test players for the whole campaign. He scored two centuries and five half centuries against full strength teams from other states and was rewarded with selection in Lindsay Hassett's testimonial match, which was effectively a Test trial match. Harvey ended the season with 699 runs at a batting average of 49.92. At the start of the following season, Harvey was included in an Australian XI for a match against the touring England cricket team for a Test trial match. However, rain curtailed the match and turned the playing surface into a sticky wicket hostile to batting. Harvey made only seven in his only innings. He played in all of Victoria's matches for the season, despite a form slump—he scored only 206 runs at 18.72. He was then overlooked for state selection until 1958–59, when he regained his position late in the season and made 97 and 86 in consecutive innings. However, the following season, he made only sporadic appearances despite the absence of the Test players overseas and aggregated only 133 runs at 16.62 in four matches and he was never selected for Victoria again. He shone mainly for Fitzroy in Victorian Premier Cricket, scoring 19 centuries and 9,146 runs in first-grade competition, both of which are still club records.

== Early years ==
Ray Harvey's father, Horace "Horry" Harvey moved to Broken Hill, New South Wales where he worked for BHP driving horse-drawn trailers. In 1914, he married Elsie May Bitmead and their first two children, daughter Rita and son Mervyn, were born in the mining town. The family relocated to Newcastle, a mining town and harbour in New South Wales and had two more sons, Mick and Harold there. In 1926, the Harveys shifted to the inner-Melbourne suburb of Fitzroy, a staunchly working-class, industrial area. During their relocation, Ray was born in Sydney. Horace secured a job at the confectionery company Life Savers (Australasia) Ltd. located next door to their house at 198 Argyle Street. The 19th century two-storey house was owned by the firm and was used as lodgings for the workers' families. It no longer exists, having been demolished to make way for a textile factory. The two youngest sons Neil and Brian were born in Fitzroy.

The Cornish-descended Horry raised his family as strict Methodists, disallowing gambling, alcohol, tobacco and profanity in his household. An ardent cricketer during his years in New South Wales, he was good enough to hit 196 runs during a match in Newcastle, and he encouraged his children to play sport. He himself played for the Rita Social Club after moving to Fitzroy, while his wife kept score.

As recreational facilities and grass ovals were sparse in densely populated Fitzroy, the boys took to playing cricket in a cobblestone laneway between their terraced house. Here they played cricket with a tennis ball, homemade cricket bat and a kerosene tin for a wicket. They were usually joined by other local children, two of whom became elite sportsmen: Allan Ruthven (an Australian rules footballer) and Harold Shillinglaw (both an Australian rules footballer and first-class cricketer)—the group also played Australian rules football, kicking around rolled up cardboard and newspaper. Much of the batting skill displayed by the Harvey brothers has been attributed to these games played on the unpredictable bounce of the bumpy laneway. The surface also had a V-shaped slope inwards towards the centre of the lane, causing balls to deviate sideways after bouncing. As the laneway meant that the playing area was long and narrow, the young boys also had to learn to play the ball straight in accordance with orthodox cricket technique. The Harveys played another form of cricket in their concreted backyard using a marble instead of a ball that sharpened their reflexes, and a miniature bat. All were right-handed batsmen with the exception of Neil.

All of the children attended the nearby George Street State School and one by one the brothers joined the Fitzroy Cricket Club as they reached their early teens. The club had a program whereby they gave a medal for every local school to award to the best cricketer in their ranks in that year. The successful student would then be given access to all of the club's facilities. All of the Harvey brothers were recipients were of this medal. At Fitzroy, they came under the influence of former Victorian all-rounder Arthur Liddicut and the club's veteran captain Joe Plant. The Harveys had no formal coaching, and their father, although a regular presence at the club, chose to stay in the background as their respective careers developed. Horace did not advise his sons on how to bat, allowing them to formulate their own style and technique. According to the Harvey brothers, it was their mother who was vocal and extroverted, in contrast to their reserved father. The boys who failed to score runs were given kitchen duty and according to them, their parents never showed favouritism.

During the winter, they played baseball for the Fitzroy Baseball Club, often competing in matches played as curtain raisers to the elite Australian rules football competition, the Victorian Football League. In 1948, Harvey was selected at short stop in the 1948 All-Australian baseball team. Saturday night entertainment for the family typically consisted of dinner after the day's cricket matches for Fitzroy and Plant, Liddicut and other club personnel were often invited. Under the influence of cricketing mentors Plant and Liddicut, the boys were taught to adopt an aggressive approach, using fast feet movement to attack spin bowling in particular. Harvey made his First XI debut for Fitzroy in 1941–42. In 1943–44, he scored a club record of 817 First XI runs in a season. In 1942–43, Neil was promoted to Fitzroy's First XI, joining Merv, Mick and Ray. During that season, the family held down the first four batting positions for Fitzroy; Merv and Mick opened the batting and Ray and Neil came in after them. Ray continued to play for Fitzroy over the next two decades when he was not required by Victoria. Outside cricket, Harvey was an electrical fitter and he worked for the Melbourne & Metropolitan Tramways Board. He and his wife Lorna and settled in the inner-northern suburb of Reservoir.

== First-class beginnings ==
Midway through the 1947–48 season, Harvey was called into the Victorian team for the Sheffield Shield match against New South Wales and made his debut alongside Merv and Neil, who were already established players. Merv opened, while Neil and Ray batted at Nos. 4 and 7 respectively. Victoria batted first and the brothers again did not form any partnerships as they were always out before the next sibling came in to bat. Ray came in at 5/208 to make 43. Victoria ended with 331 and the Harvey brothers had scored almost half the runs. New South Wales were forced to follow on and Victoria were set 51 for victory. After the fall of Fred Freer at 1/24, captain Lindsay Hassett elevated Ray to No. 3, allowing two Harveys to bat together for the first time at first-class level. Ray and Merv put on an unbeaten partnership of 27 to take Victoria to a nine-wicket win. Merv and Ray ended unbeaten on 12 and 22 respectively.

The three brothers played together in the next match against Western Australia. Merv captained the team as Hassett was away on Test duty. Victoria batted first and Ray made only 1. In the second innings, Ray 15, not batting with his brothers in a drawn match.

The brotherly trio was broken up for the match against Queensland, as Neil was selected for the Australian team. In his only innings, Ray scored 48 and appeared set for his maiden first-class half-century before being run out in a drawn match. He bowled eight overs for the season, conceding 32 runs without taking a wicket. Merv dropped after this match, and Ray made 9 and 15 alongside Neil in the next fixture against New South Wales, a six-wicket win. Ray played in the next match against Tasmania with none of his brothers alongside him, as Neil was again busy with the national team. Ray made two in his only innings in a ten-wicket win. Despite his run of low scores, he was retained as Neil and the other Test players returned; he made 25 and 10 as Victoria lost by four wickets in their final match of the season against South Australia. Ray ended his debut first-class season with 190 runs at a batting average of 21.11 with a best score of 48.

== Fringe Victorian player ==
After a poor debut season for Victoria, Harvey did not gain first-class selection in 1948–49 and vacancies were hard to come by as the season was purely domestic with no touring Test team, so all of Australia's international representatives were available for the whole season. Harvey was selected for a Second XI match against New South Wales but failed to make an impact, scoring two runs in each innings as the Victorians completed a 195-run win. Harvey took the wicket of H Hinman in the first innings, ending with 1/24 from four overs.

The following season, 1949–50, with the Australian Test team in South Africa for the whole of the southern hemisphere summer, Victoria lost batsmen Lindsay Hassett, Sam Loxton and Neil Harvey. Despite the extra vacancies, Ray was only selected for one match, against Tasmania, making 9 and 45 in a four-wicket win. This was effectively a second-choice Victorian team as the leading players were involved in a Shield match against New South Wales at the same time.

Harvey's 1950–51 season was similarly unproductive, with the Test players back in Australia for a home series against England. He was only selected for the two first class matches against Tasmania, was even less successful. In the first match, he made a duck in the first innings, before coming to the crease at the end of the run-chase and being yet to score as a nine wicket win was completed. In the next match he made 0 and 9, as Victoria scraped home for a nine run win, despite Harvey conceding 20 runs from four wicketless overs. He ended the first class season with 9 runs at 3.00. In a Second XI fixture against New South Wales, he made 61 before being bowled by Alan Davidson. In the first innings he delivered one over and was attacked heavily, conceding 23 runs. In the second innings, he bowled 13 overs and took 1/49 as New South Wales ended 24 runs short of making Victoria bat again with three wickets in hand when the match ended in a draw.

In 1951–52, Harvey was in and out of the team on a regular basis as the Test players were periodically available for Victorian duty between the international matches. With the Test players away for the first two Sheffield Shield matches, Harvey played in both fixtures. He made only 28 in the first match, an innings win over Western Australia. He also took two catches. In the next match against South Australia, he made 47 out of Victoria's 281 and took his first wickets at first-class level, dismissing century-maker Ernest England and tail-ender Geff Noblet and ending with 2/29 and two catches as Victoria conceded a 240-run first innings lead. He then made 18 as his team collapsed for 101 to lose by an innings. Harvey was then dropped for the next three matches, as the Test players, including his younger brother Neil, returned. With a Test match in progress at the same time, he was recalled for the home match against Queensland but made only 35 and 14 as Victoria collapsed in the second innings to be 9/147, holding on for a draw with one wicket in hand. Harvey bowled seven overs in the match and conceded 0/51. He was immediately dropped again when the Test players returned, before being recalled for the away match against Queensland when the national representatives were again unavailable. Harvey then made 31 and 1 in a narrow 18-run loss. Having made only 21 of Victoria's 647 in the next match against Tasmania, he was dropped for the final Shield match when the Test players returned. Harvey ended the season with 195 runs at 24.37; he reached 14 in all but one of his eight innings but was unable to convert his starts into large scores, with a highest innings of 47.

Harvey was unable to gain selection during the 1952–53 season until late in the season, at the end of January. In his first match of the summer against New South Wales, he made 42 and 36, but was unable to convert his starts into large scores in a drawn match. The next match against the touring South Africans proceeded similarly. In a drawn encounter, Harvey made 47 in the first innings and was unbeaten on 5 in the run-chase when time ran out. In the final match of the season, against Western Australia, Harvey broke through for his maiden first-class century, scoring 121 in an innings victory over Western Australia. It was also his first score of 50 or more at first-class level. He took seven catches in his three matches and ended the season with 251 runs at 62.75, and took a total of 0/43 from 15 overs.

== Peak years and pushing for national selection ==
Having broken through for his first century at the end of the previous season, Harvey played consistently in 1953–54, and was selected for each of Victoria's matches for the season for the first time. He did so despite the fact that there were no Tests scheduled for the Australian season, meaning that the international representatives would be available for all of Victoria's matches. Ray and Neil played together in every match of the summer. In the opening match of the season against Queensland, Ray Harvey made 82 and 8 in a 254-run win. He followed this with 2 and 91 in the next match against New South Wales over the Christmas holiday period. Harvey was one of the few batsmen to make an impact in the second innings, as the New South Wales bowlers, including the likes of Keith Miller, Ray Lindwall, Richie Benaud and Davidson, all members of Australia's Test bowling attack, dismissed Victoria for only 222 to set up a nine-wicket win. A week later, he started the new year by scoring 110 as Victoria batted first and took a 117-run first innings lead against South Australia. He made only 10 in the second innings but his state completed a 290-run win nonetheless.

Harvey was then rewarded with selection in a testimonial match for retiring Australian captain Lindsay Hassett. Typically, such matches involved the best players in Australia divided into two teams, and Harvey played for Arthur Morris's XI against Hassett's outfit. Harvey scored 69 and 17 as his team completed a 121-run win. He also bowled three overs in total, but was unsuccessful, conceding 27 runs as the opposition batsmen attacked him. Harvey then made 50 and 19 in a drawn match again Queensland.

Harvey played a key part in Victoria's win over New South Wales away at the SCG. Having taken two catches as the hosts batted first, he made 61 as the visitors made 234 to take a 52-run first innings lead. After taking another catch in the second innings, he then made an unbeaten 106 to guide the Victorians to their target of 268 with five wickets in hand. Harvey's run-scoring tapered away in the last two matches of the season; he made 74 runs in three innings in the match. Nevertheless, he ended the season with 699 runs at 49.92; he had made the same number of runs in his first six first-class seasons since his debut in 1947–48. As a result of his performances in this season, he was hailed as the best batsman outside the Australian Test team.

Harvey's performances were rewarded with selection for an Australian XI in a tour match against the England cricket team at the start of the 1954–55 season. However, the match was curtailed by rain and Harvey was not able to exhibit his talents on a sticky wicket highly difficult for batting. Listed at No. 4, Harvey came in after the dismissal of his brother and made seven in his only innings. As a result, Ray was not chosen for the Test team alongside his brother during the season.

This was the start of a poor season for Harvey as he managed a top-score of only 44 in 11 innings for the summer, passing 20 on only four occasions and ending with 206 runs at 18.72. Despite this, the Victorian selectors persisted with him for every match of the season.

== Final seasons ==
Harvey was overlooked for selection for entirety of the 1955–56 season. After four years out of first-class cricket, Harvey earned a recall in the latter half of the 1958–59 season for a match against Queensland. He made only 21 in the first innings and was unbeaten on 17 when time ran out in the second innings. He was retained for the match against South Australia the following week and scored 97 in an innings win. In the subsequent fixture against New South Wales, who were in the process of completing a sixth consecutive Shield title, Harvey faced a full-strength team with Australia's two leading Test bowlers Benaud and Davidson. He made 86 in the first innings but managed only 6 in the second before being removed by Benaud, as the Victorians ended 37 runs short of victory with five wickets in hand when time ran out. Harvey made six in his only innings in the last match of the season against Queensland. He ended the season with 233 runs at 46.60.

In 1959–60, the Test team toured the Indian subcontinent during the Australian summer, opening up more vacancies in the Sheffield Shield. Harvey was given a recall in December 1959. However, he was not successful and failed to convert his starts into substantial scores, making 8, 36, 12, 25, 22 and 20 in three matches. In the last of these matches, he took his career-best bowling figures of 3/26, in the first innings against South Australia. He dismissed the top-scorer John Lill for 176 and his other victims were Michael Clingly and Peter Trethewey. This allowed Victoria to take first innings points and eventually complete a six-wicket win. This meant that all of Harvey's five wickets as first-class level came against South Australia. Harvey's first-class career ended with the following match against New South Wales. He made 1 and 9, and conceded 26 runs from three wicketless overs, and was dropped, having made only 133 runs at 16.62 for the season.

In 1960–61, Harvey played a final First XI season for Fitzroy. His Fitzroy first-grade records for the most career runs and centuries, and the most runs in a season, still stand, and he managed a double-century for the club against University. He ended his first-grade career with 19 centuries and 9,146 runs at an average of 36.15 from 247 matches.

== Style ==
Harvey was an attacking and free-flowing batsman but he was not a prolific scorer, which was attributed by observers to a lack of single-mindedness required to succeed at the top level. Neil said that Ray's footwork was suspect and that the stronger bowlers in domestic cricket were able to exploit this. Neil said that if Ray had been able to rectify his weakness, then he could have become a Test player for Australia. Australian captain Bill Lawry said that Harvey was one of the two best district cricketers he had faced. Aside from his batting, Harvey was an occasional leg spinner, and was known for his fielding ability.
