= Fitzroy, Victoria =

Fitzroy
- Suburb
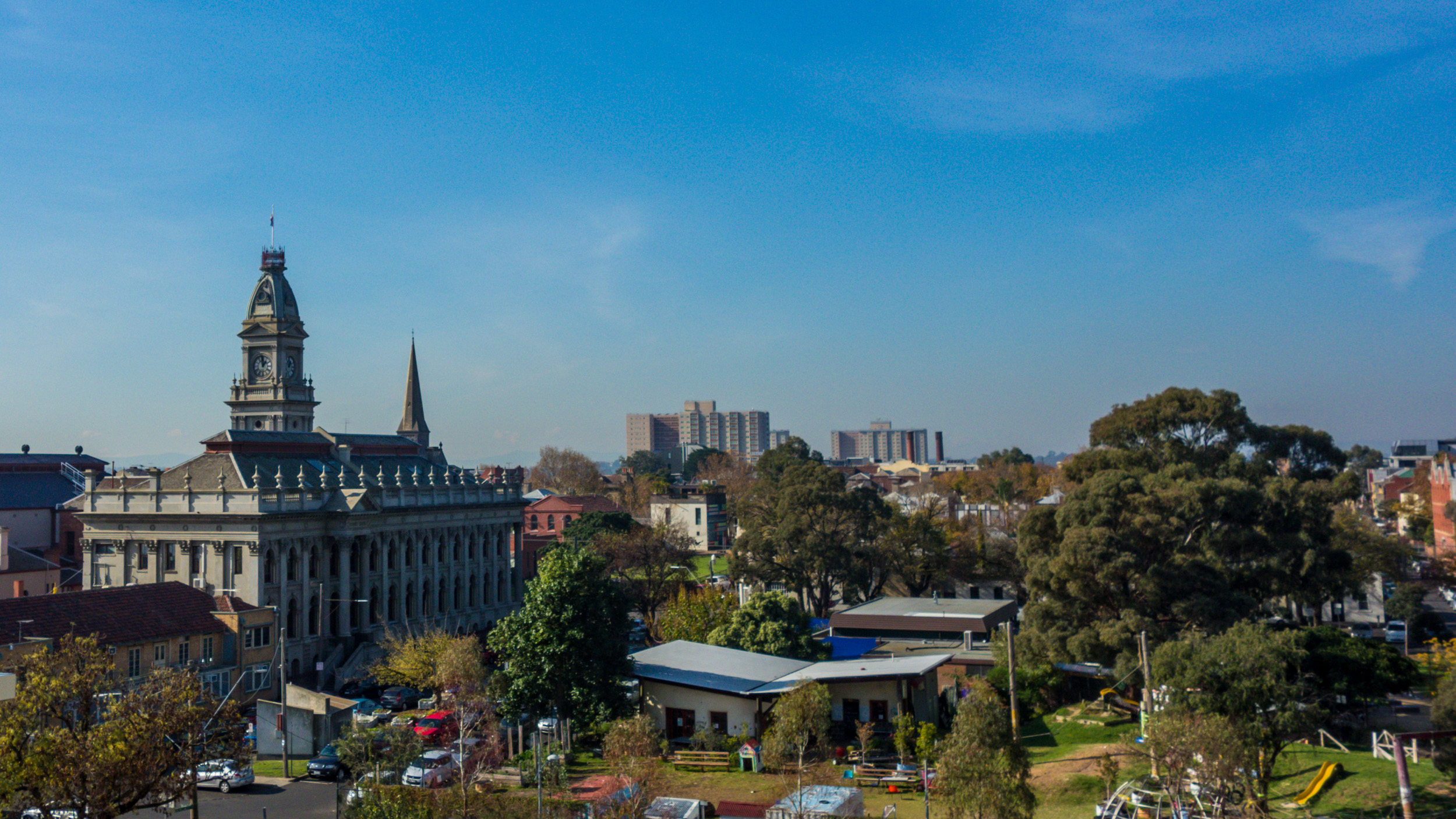
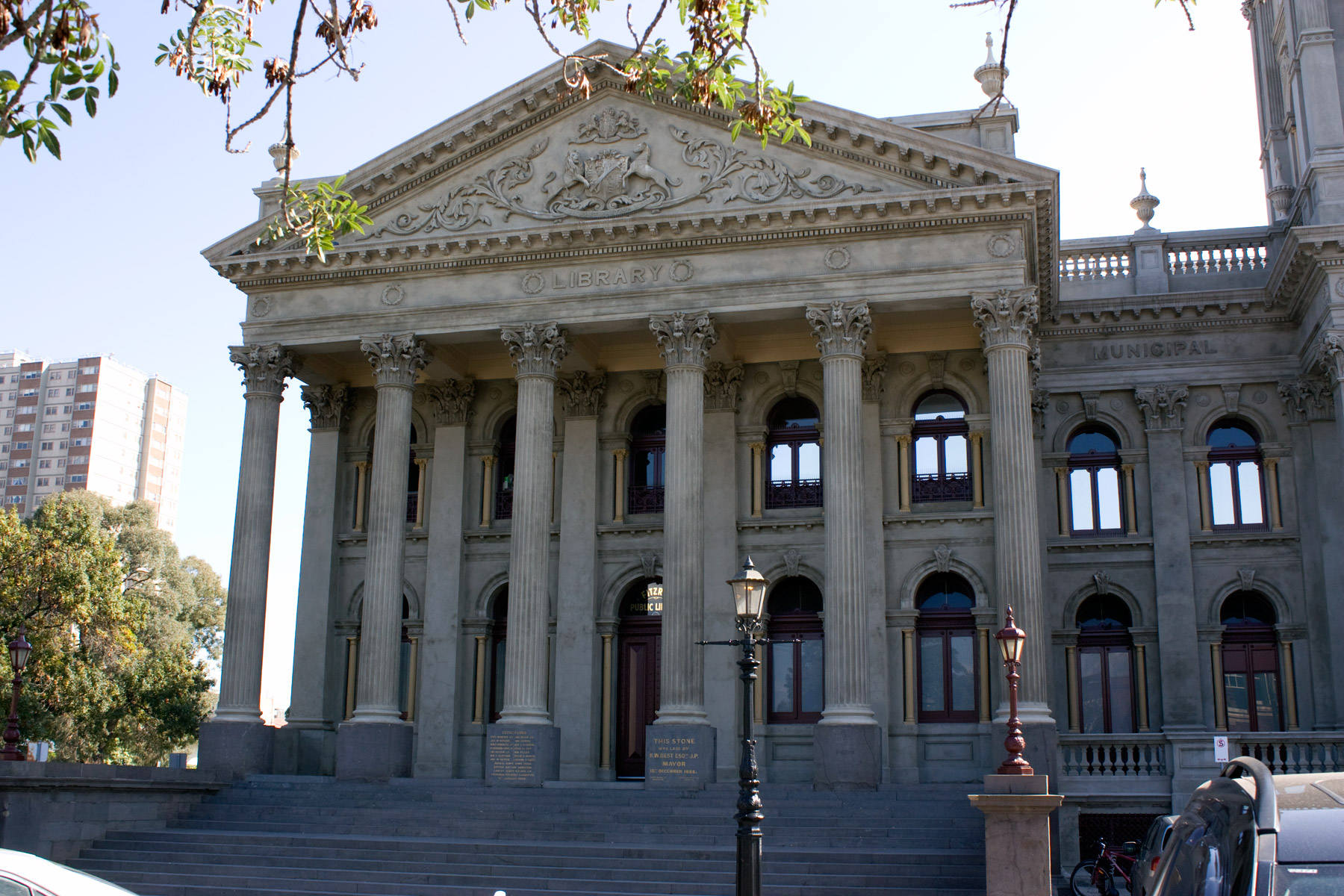
- The Fitzroy skyline, with the Fitzroy Town Hall visible on the far left Fitzroy Town Hall

- Interactive map of Fitzroy
- Coordinates: 37.7984°S 144.9785°E
- Country: Australia
- State: Victoria
- City: Melbourne
- LGA: City of Yarra
- Location: 3 km (1.9 mi) from Melbourne CBD
- Established: 1839

Government
  - State electorate: Richmond
  - Federal division: Melbourne

Area
  - Total: 1.4 km^{2} (0.54 sq mi)
- Elevation: 35 m (115 ft)

Population
  - Total: 10,431 (SAL 2021)
- Postcode: 3065
Suburbs around Fitzroy
Carlton North	Fitzroy North	Clifton Hill
Carlton	Fitzroy	Collingwood
Melbourne	East Melbourne	Richmond

Fitzroy is an inner-city suburb in Melbourne, Victoria, Australia, three kilometres (two miles) northeast of the Melbourne central business district, located within the City of Yarra local government area. Fitzroy recorded a population of 10,431 at the 2021 census.

Planned as Melbourne's first suburb in 1839, it later became one of the city's first areas to gain municipal status, in 1858, then known as Fitz Roy. It occupies Melbourne's smallest and most densely populated area outside the CBD, just 100 ha.

Fitzroy is known as a cultural hub, particularly for its live music scene and street art, and is the main home of the Melbourne Fringe Festival. Its commercial heart is Brunswick Street, one of Melbourne's major retail, culinary strips. the intersection of Smith and Gurtrude street has become a nightlife hub, especially for queer venues and events.

From the 1960s through to the 1980s, the area became a meeting place for Aboriginal people who had left government institutions and reserves. Musicians such as Archie Roach spent time there as a young man, later described in his song "Charcoal Lane". Vika and Linda Bull started their careers singing in Fitzroy venues such as the Black Cat Cafe. Long associated with the working class, Fitzroy has undergone waves of urban renewal and gentrification since the 1980s and today is home to a wide variety of socio-economic groups, featuring both some of the most expensive rents in Melbourne and one of its largest public housing complexes, Atherton Gardens.

Its built environment is diverse and features some of the finest examples of Victorian era architecture in Melbourne. Much of the suburb is a historic preservation precinct, with many individual buildings and streetscapes covered by Heritage Overlays. The most recent changes to Fitzroy are mandated by the Melbourne 2030 Metropolitan Strategy, in which both Brunswick Street and nearby Smith Street are designated for redevelopment as Activity centres.

The suburb was named after Sir Charles Augustus FitzRoy, the Governor of New South Wales from 1846 to 1855. It is bordered by Alexandra Parade (north), Victoria Parade (south), Smith Street (east) and Nicholson Street.

== History ==
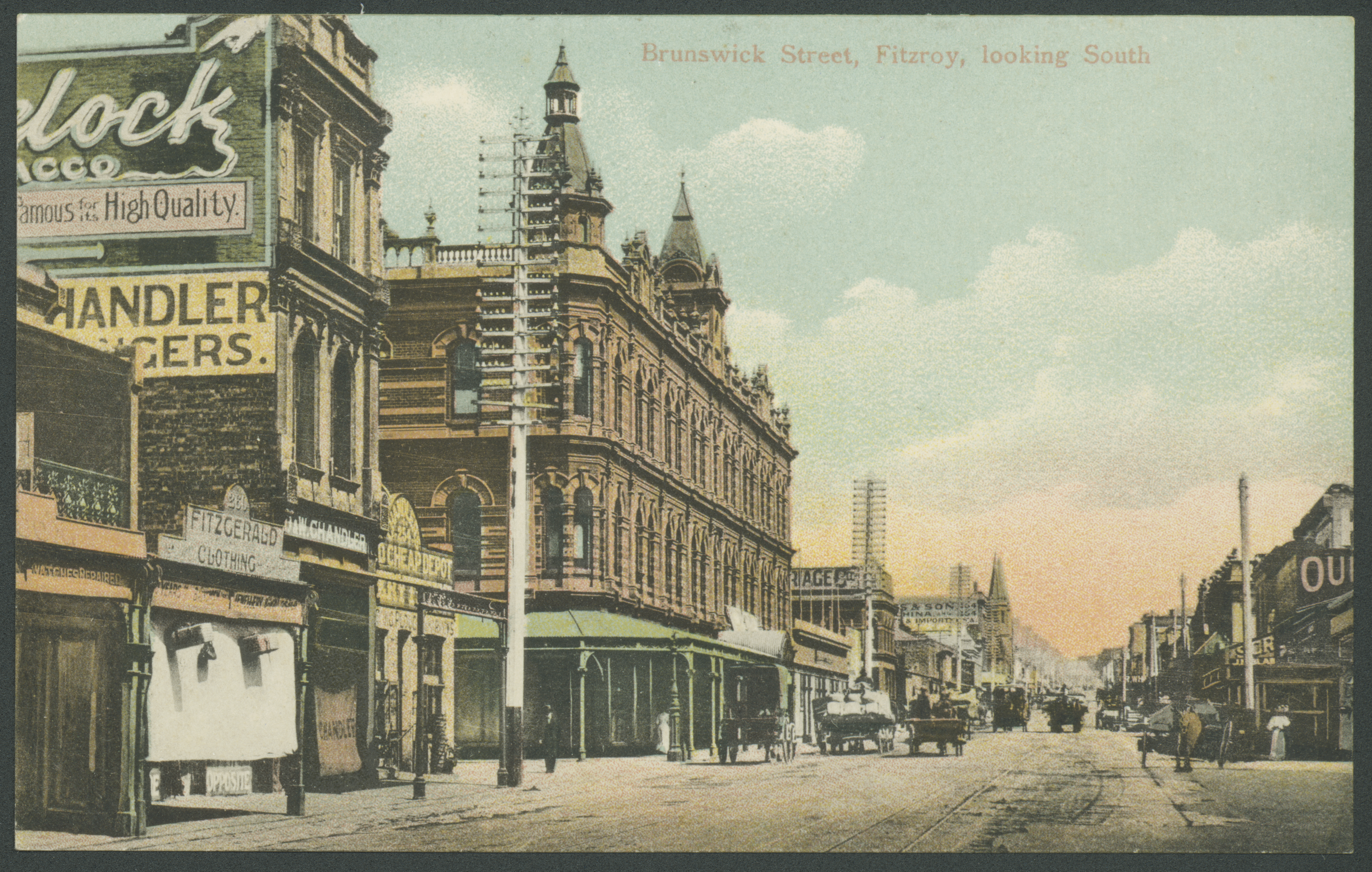
Looking south down Brunswick Street in 1906

=== Pre-settlement history ===
The area that is now known as Fitzroy and Collingwood was part of the territory of the country of the Woiwurrung people of the Kulin nation. The area that is now known as Fitzroy was the land of the Wurundjeri people.

Anthropologist Alfred William Howitt recorded Ngár-go (meaning "high ground") as the Woiwurrung word for Fitzroy in working notes rediscovered in 2018, likely sourced from conversations with elder William Barak between 1897 and 1901. However, it is unclear whether this referred to a broader area (possibly a clan boundary) or an individual hill. In another document, Howitt wrote that Ngár-go referred to a net bag worn by men over their shoulders.

The name Ngár-go has been revived in a 2021 project called Yalinguth (meaning "yesterday").

=== 19th century ===
Melbourne's first suburb, Fitzroy was effectively created on 13 February 1839, when the area between Melbourne and Alexandra Parade (originally named Newtown) was subdivided into vacant lots and offered for sale. Newtown was later renamed Collingwood, and the area now called Fitzroy (west of Smith Street) was made a ward of the Melbourne City Council. On 9 September 1858, Fitzroy became a municipality in its own right, separate from the City of Melbourne. In accordance with the Municipal Act, on 28 September 1858, a meeting of ratepayers was held in 'Mr Templeton's schoolroom, George street' to prepare for a local council election, with Thomas Embling, MLA for Collingwood, presiding. The council election took place two days later and the first councilors were; Thomas Rae, George Symons, Edward Langton, Henry Groom, Benjamin Bell, Edwin Bennett and Thomas Hargreave. The first council meeting, held after the declaration of election, was at the Exchange Hotel, George Street, and Symons was unanimously elected chair.

Surrounded as it was by a large number of factories and industrial sites in the adjoining suburbs, Fitzroy was ideally suited to working men's housing, and from the 1860s to the 1880s, Fitzroy's working class population rose dramatically. The area's former mansions became boarding houses and slums, and the heightened poverty of the area prompted the establishment of several charitable, religious and philanthropic organisations in the area over the next few decades. A notable local entrepreneur was Macpherson Robertson, whose confectionery factories covered 30 hectares and stand as heritage landmarks today.

The Fitzroy Gasworks was erected on Reilly Street (now Alexandra Parade) in 1861, dominating the suburb, with the Gasometer Hotel located opposite.

=== 20th century ===
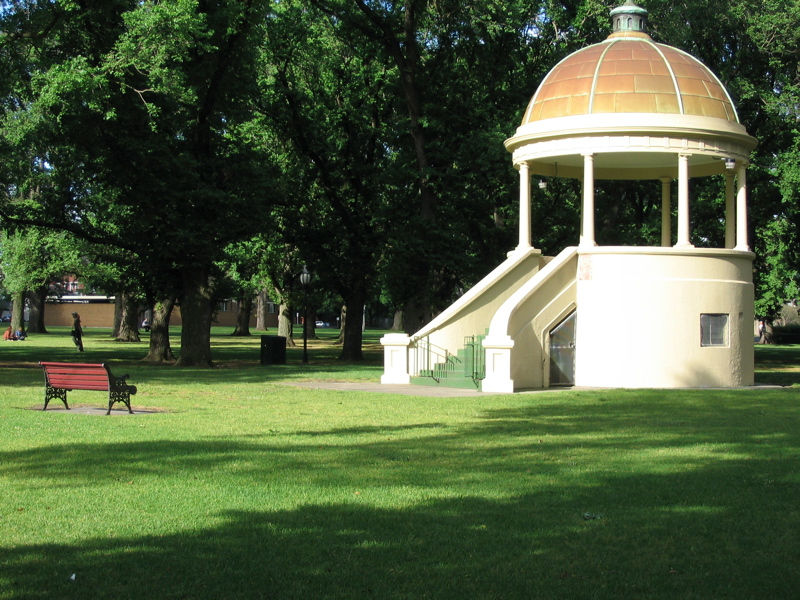
Fitzroy Memorial Rotunda, built 1925 in honour of Fitzroy casualties of World War I

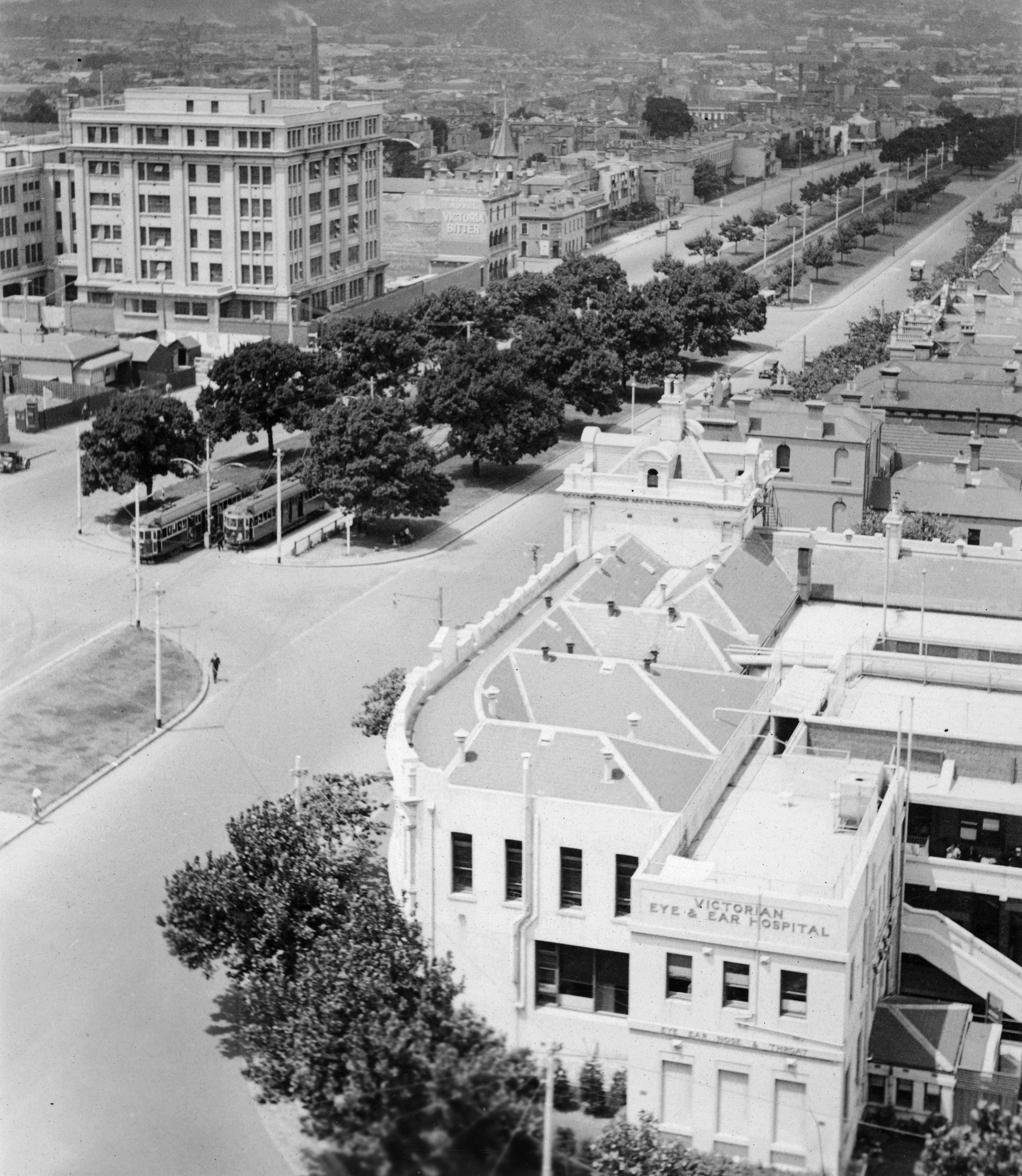
Victoria Parade, Fitzroy, 1935

The population of Fitzroy in 1901 was 31,610.

Before World War I, Fitzroy was a working-class neighbourhood, with a concentration of political radicals already living there. Post-war immigration into the suburb resulted in the area becoming socially diverse. Many working-class Chinese immigrants settled in Fitzroy due to its proximity to Chinatown. The establishment of the Housing Commission of Victoria in 1938 saw swathes of new residences being constructed in Melbourne's outer suburbs. With many of Fitzroy's residents moving to the new accommodation, their places were taken by post-war immigrants, mostly from Italy and Greece and the influx of Italian and Irish immigrants saw a marked shift towards Catholicism from Fitzroy's traditional Methodist and Presbyterian roots. The Housing Commission would build two public housing estates in Fitzroy in the 1960s; one in Hanover Street and one at the southern end of Brunswick Street.

From the 1960s through to the 1980s, the area became a meeting place for Aboriginal people who had left missions, Aboriginal reserves, and other government institutions and drifted to the city in a bid to trace their families. The Builders Arms Hotel was the only pub which allowed Aboriginal people to drink there. The Aboriginal Health Service opened on Gertrude Street in 1973 and provided a service largely provided by volunteers, operating as a de facto community centre there until 1992. A nearby street behind a factory was a meeting and drinking place, known to the community as Charcoal Lane. Archie Roach tells of his time in Fitzroy hanging out and getting drunk, and of reconnecting with his siblings there, in his autobiography, Tell Me Why: The Story of My Life and My Music. His song "Charcoal Lane" mentions Gertrude Street, Brunswick Street, and other locations in Fitzroy and his time wandering the streets there. Vika and Linda Bull started their careers by singing in various venues around Fitzroy in the 1980s, including the Black Cat Cafe (which opened in 1982) and the Purple Pit. The area is highly significant in the history of the Australian Aboriginal rights movement.

The Fitzroy Magistrates' Court closed on 1 February 1985.

Like other inner-city suburbs of Melbourne, Fitzroy underwent a process of gentrification from the 1980s onwards. The area's manufacturing and warehouse sites were converted into apartments, and the corresponding rising rents in Fitzroy saw many of the area's residents move to Northcote and Brunswick.

In June 1994, the City of Yarra was created by combining the Cities of Fitzroy, Collingwood and Richmond.

=== 21st century ===
Gentrification continued into the 2000s, with Gertrude Street being transformed into a string of fine dining restaurants, art galleries, bookshops and fashion stores.

In 2009 the Aboriginal Health Service building at 136 Gertrude Street was converted into a social enterprise restaurant called Charcoal Lane, run by Mission Australia, which provided training for Aboriginal and Torres Strait Islander young people and became well known for its gastronomy. It closed its doors in August 2021, during the COVID-19 pandemic, and the historic building was handed back to the Victorian Aboriginal Health Service (VAHS).

== Geography ==
Fitzroy's topography is flat. It is laid out in grid plan and is characterised by a fairly tightly spaced rectangular grid of medium-sized streets, with many of its narrow streets and back lanes facilitating only one-way traffic. Its built form is a legacy of its early history when a mixture of land uses was allowed to develop close to each other, producing a great diversity of types and scales of building.

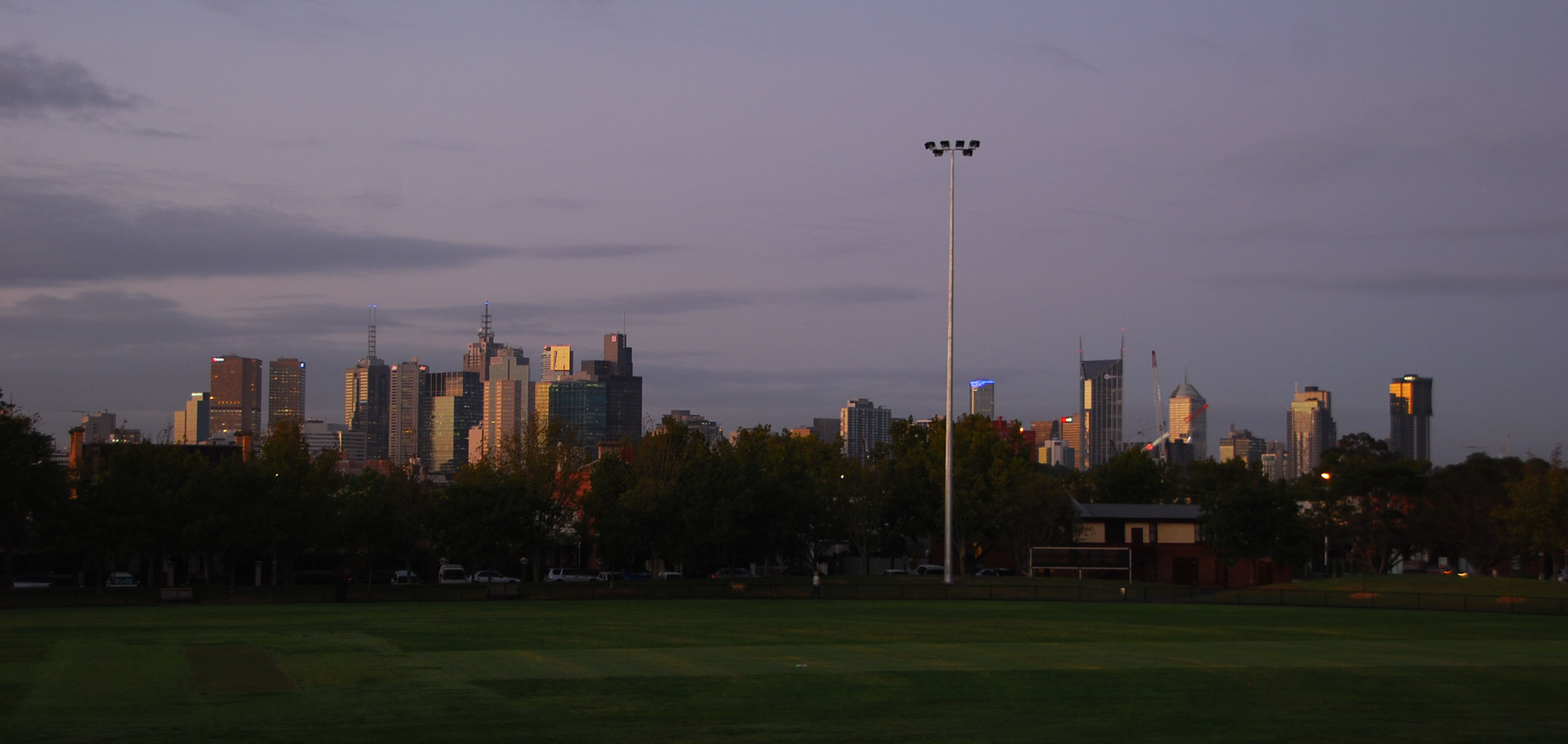
The skyline of Melbourne from Brunswick Street Oval, Fitzroy.

== Demographics ==
In the 2021 Australian census conducted by the Australian Bureau of Statistics, the total population of Fitzroy was recorded as 10,431 people. Only 58 (0.3%) of the population identified as Aboriginal and/or Torres Strait Islander. Just over 60% of the population were born in Australia, but 41.4% of residents had both parents born overseas. The most common countries of birth were England 4.5%, Vietnam 3.3%, New Zealand 3.0%, China 2.1% and United States of America 1.5%.

In the 2016 census, Fitzroy had a population of 10,445. The median age (33) was younger than the national average (38), while the median weekly individual income (AU$925 per week) was higher than the national average (AU$662). Only 24.9% of Fitzroy's population were married, compared to 48.1% nationwide.

In 2016, 53.3% of people were born in Australia. The most common countries of birth were England 3.9%, Vietnam 3.3%, New Zealand 2.9%, China 2.7% and United States of America 1.2%. 61.0% of people only spoke English at home. Other languages spoken at home included Vietnamese 4.1%, Mandarin 2.5%, Cantonese 2.1%, Arabic 2.0% and Greek 1.6%.

== Housing ==
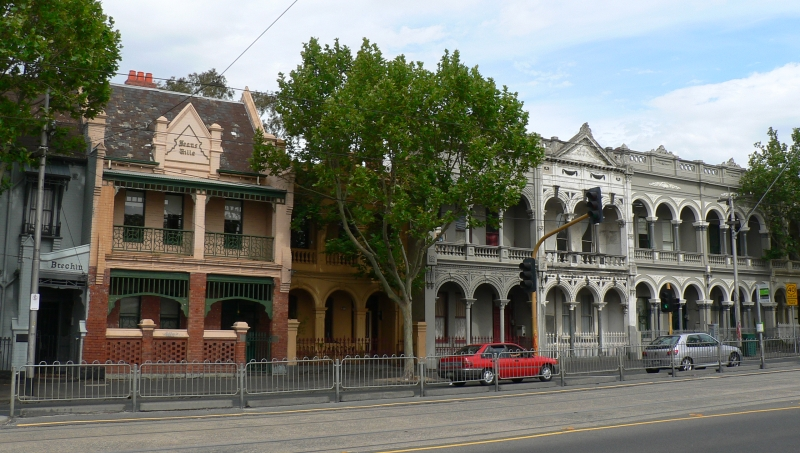
Terraced houses on Nicholson Street

Fitzroy's housing is diverse. It has some of Melbourne's earliest surviving houses and one of Melbourne's most extensive stands of terraced housing, along with a mix of converted industrial and commercial buildings, walk-up flats, modern apartments and public housing.

Among the earliest homes are Royal Terrace (1853–1858) on Nicholson Street. Overlooking the Carlton Gardens, Royal Terrace was one of the first of its kind in Melbourne. Fitzroy's "character housing" (pre-war) is now mostly gentrified and highly sought after real estate.

As early as 1923, the City of Fitzroy was accused of 'creating slums' by allowing inappropriate development such as three houses on a 31-foot by 100-foot block. By 1953, the state Housing Minister Thomas Hayes, said that Camp Pell in Royal Park, Parkville, Victoria, which had been a temporary military camp for United States forces during the Second World War, 'might become a permanent emergency housing settlement' and 'Fitzroy slum dwellers who had refused offers of alternative accommodation by the housing Commission because they would have to pay higher rents would probably' be moved there. Two years later the headline was 'Outcry Rages Over Fitzroy Slums', as the state government accused the Commonwealth of bringing in immigrants that the states had nowhere to house, arguing that the 'Awful, dilapidated buildings in Fitzroy, crowded beyond description with exploited New Australians were a grave danger to the health of the community.' The Atherton Gardens high-rise public housing estate, on the corner of Brunswick and Gertrude streets, is one of Melbourne's largest, built by the Housing Commission of Victoria as part of its controversial "slum clearance" urban renewal program in the 1960s. The commission was established by the Housing Act 1937 in response to slum housing in Melbourne, and operated under the Slum Reclamation and Housing Act 1938.

Since at least the early 2000s, some Fitzroy residents have opposed medium or high density housing. In 2003, residents objected to an eight-story building designed by local architect Ivan Rijavec on a site near two activity centres and public transport.

As of 2019, the City of Yarra found housing suitable for a family in Fitzroy would be unaffordable for a moderate income family, let alone a low-income family. Median rents are well above what is considered affordable.

In 2026, the Fitzroy Residents Association claimed the price of apartments in Fitzroy had not increased. The association claimed there is no evidence of demand for apartments exceeding supply in Fitzroy, and that oversupply is keeping prices down.

== Governance ==
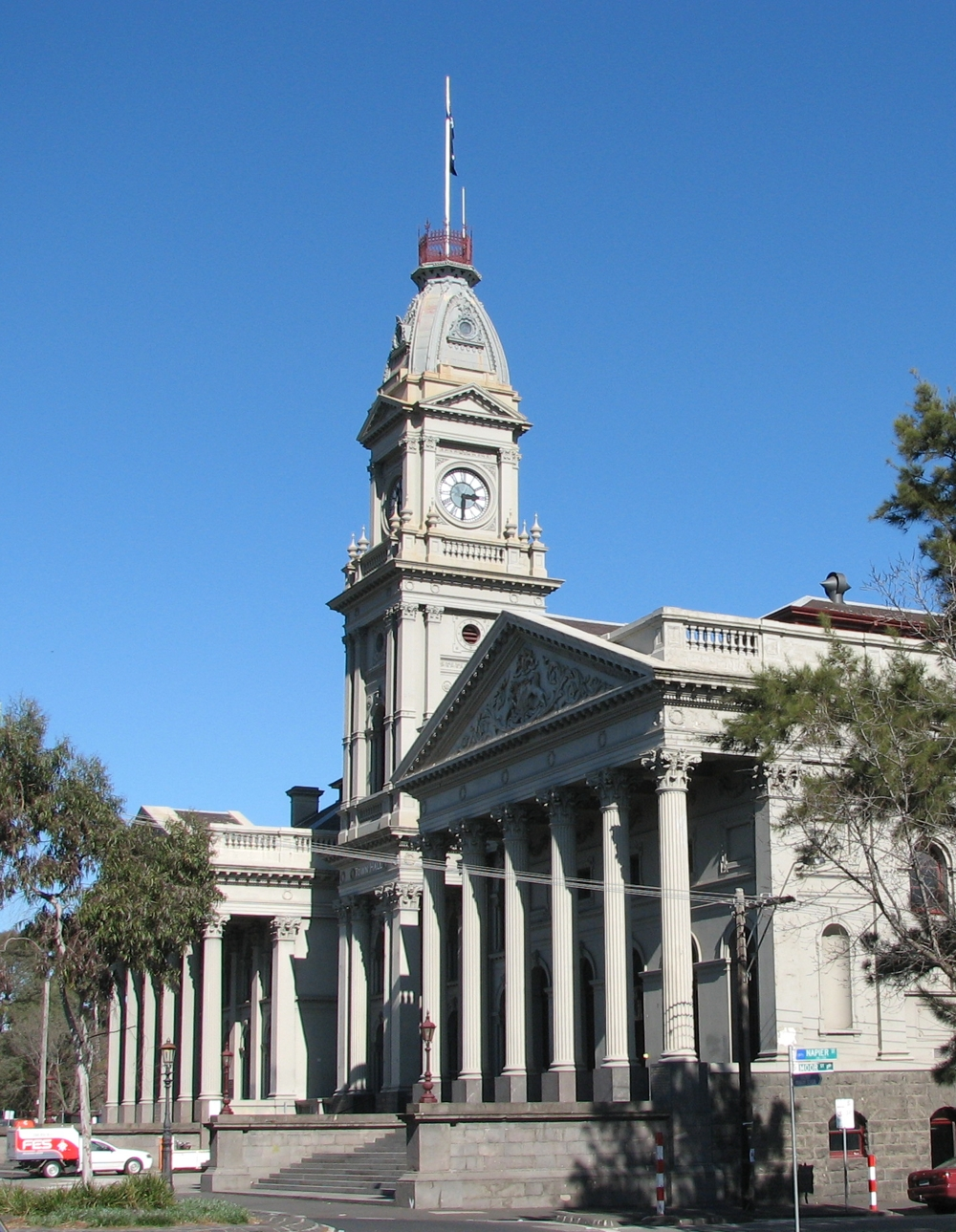
Former Fitzroy Town Hall, now functions as secondary offices for the City of Yarra

Fitzroy's traditional representation at all levels of government reflects the area's working class and bohemianism, and Left-wing politics dominates. The Australian Labor Party and more recently the Australian Greens both have a very strong political presence.

At a local level, Fitzroy is part of the City of Yarra Local Government Area. The Fitzroy area falls within the wards of Langridge and Nicholls, both of which are currently represented by the Australian Greens.

At a state level, Fitzroy is within the Electoral district of Richmond, traditionally a safe Australian Labor Party seat.

At federal level, it is within the Division of Melbourne, where Australian Greens leader Adam Bandt was unseated by Sarah Witty of the Labor following the 2025 Australian federal election.

=== Former City of Fitzroy and Fitzroy Town Hall ===
The area formerly had its own municipal status from 1858, with the City of Fitzroy meeting at Fitzroy Town Hall on Napier Street. The Town Hall is on the Victorian Heritage Register for its state historical and architectural significance. The building was constructed in stages (1863, 1887 and 1890) to comprise municipal offices, meeting hall, police station, courthouse and clock tower.

Since the amalgamation of the Cities of Fitzroy, Collingwood and Richmond in 1994 to form the City of Yarra, the Town Hall has functioned as secondary offices for the City of Yarra, and other occupants including the Fitzroy Legal Service, currently at Level 4, Moor Street entrance.

== Culture ==
=== Art ===
There are many small commercial art galleries, artist-run spaces and artist studios located within the suburb. Fitzroy has a thriving street art community and is also the home of Gertrude Contemporary Art Spaces and the Centre for Contemporary Photography.

=== Live performance ===
Fitzroy was the primary home of the little band scene, an experimental post-punk scene which thrived from 1978 to 1981. Initially led by local groups the Primitive Calculators and Whirlywirld, it helped foster the careers of a number of notable musicians, including members of Dead Can Dance and Hunters & Collectors.

Today Fitzroy is a hub for live music in Melbourne, and plays host to several prominent venues.

=== Heritage ===
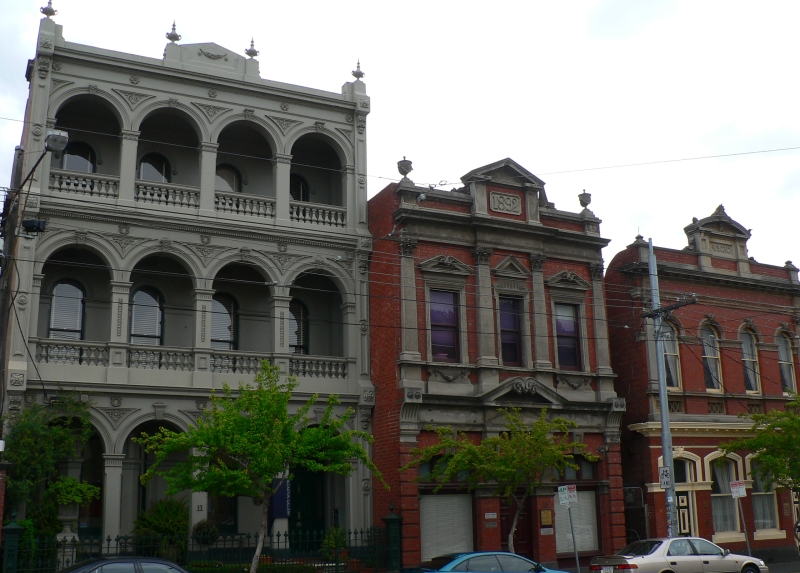
Fitzroy is home to many Victorian era buildings.

The Moran & Cato warehouse designed by R.A. Lawson is considered to be of high architectural merit. The Champion Hotel is notable for its grand and flamboyant Edwardian design.

A number of buildings and sites have been included on the Victorian Heritage Inventory (VHI) or classified by the National Trust (NT). These include:

- Aqua Profonda sign, Fitzroy Swimming Pool, 160-122 Alexandra Parade.(VHI) & (NT)
- Cordial Factory, 12–16 Argyle Street. (VHI)
- Exhibition High School Residence, 17 Bell Street. (VHI)
- National School, 40–48 Bell Street. (VHI) & (NT)
- Dodgshun House, 7–9 Brunswick Street. (VHI) & (NT)
- The Terrace, 11 Brunswick Street. (VHI) & (NT)
- Shop & residence, 13 Brunswick Street. (VHI) & (NT)
- Cathedral Hall, 20 Brunswick Street. (VHI)
- Melbourne Veterinary College, 38–40 Brunswick Street. (VHI) & (NT)
- Royal Terrace, 39–49 Brunswick Street. (VHI) & (NT)
- Shops, 236–252 Brunswick Street. (VHI)
- Fitzroy Cricket Club Grandstand, Edinburgh Gardens. (NT)
- Devonshire Arms Hotel, 38 Fitzroy Street. (VHI) & (NT)
- Christian Israelite Sanctuary, 185–193 Fitzroy Street. (VHI) & (NT)
- St Mark's Church of England, 268 George Street. (VHI) & (NT)
- Glass Terrace, 64–78 Gertrude Street. (VHI) & (NT)
- Shops & Residence, 177–183 Gertrude Street. (NT)
- Shops, 181–183 Gertrude Street. (VHI)
- Holyrood Terrace, 331 Gore Street. (VHI) & (NT)
- Cobden Terrace, 209–221 Gore Street. (VHI) & (NT)
- Residence, 35 Hanover Street. (VHI) & (NT)
- All Saints Church Hall, 95 King William Street. (VHI)
- Falconer Terrace, 36–50 Napier Street. (VHI) & (NT)
- Fitzroy Town Hall, 201 Napier Street. (VHI) & (NT)
- Cable Tram Engine House, Cnr Nicholson & Gertrude Streets. (VHI) & (NT)
- Osborne House, 40 Nicholson Street. (VHI) & (NT)
- Royal Terrace, 50–68 Nicholson Street. (VHI) & (NT)
- Mercy Convent, 88 Nicholson Street. (VHI) & (NT)
- Cairo Flats, unit 1–36, 98 Nicholson Street. (VHI) & (NT)
- Denny house, 122 Nicholson Street. (VHI) & (NT)
- Avon Butter Factory, 218–222 Nicholson Street. (VHI) & (NT)
- Methodist Church, 472 Nicholson Street. (VHI)
- Post Office, 251 St Georges Road. (NT)
- Union Bank of Australia, 165–167 Smith Street. (VHI) & (NT)
- Eastern Hill Hotel, 77 Victoria Parade. (VHI) & (NT)
- McClelland house, 203 Victoria Parade. (VHI) & (NT)
- Blanche Terrace, 163–183 Victoria Parade. (VHI) & (NT)
- Russian House (formerly Collingwood & Fitzroy United Friendly Societies Dispensary) (VHI)

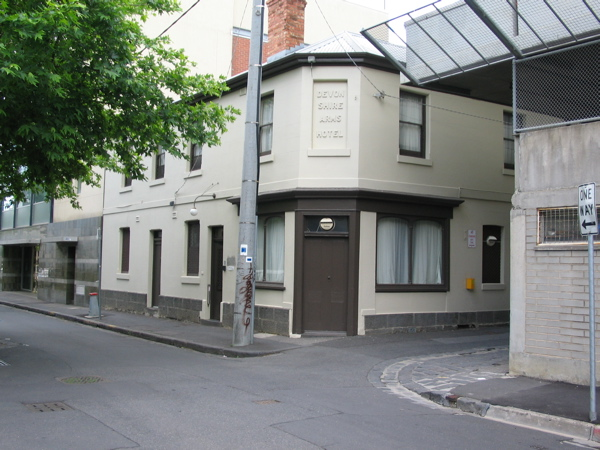
The Devonshire Arms, built in 1843, is the oldest extant building in Fitzroy.

=== Cafés ===
The tiny suburb of Fitzroy has many cafés.

The Black Cat Cafe, now styled Blackcat Fitzroy, has transformed itself into a bar/cafe and art exhibition space, but still retains its onstreet garden. Music is provided by local DJs.

With the advance of gentrification, a variety of cafés in different styles have opened up and down Brunswick Street, on Smith Street, parts of Gertrude Street and in some of the back streets, in former milk bars and warehouse sites.

=== Markets ===
There are a number of weekend artisan markets in Fitzroy, including the Fitzroy Market and the Rose Street Artists' Market.

== Sport ==
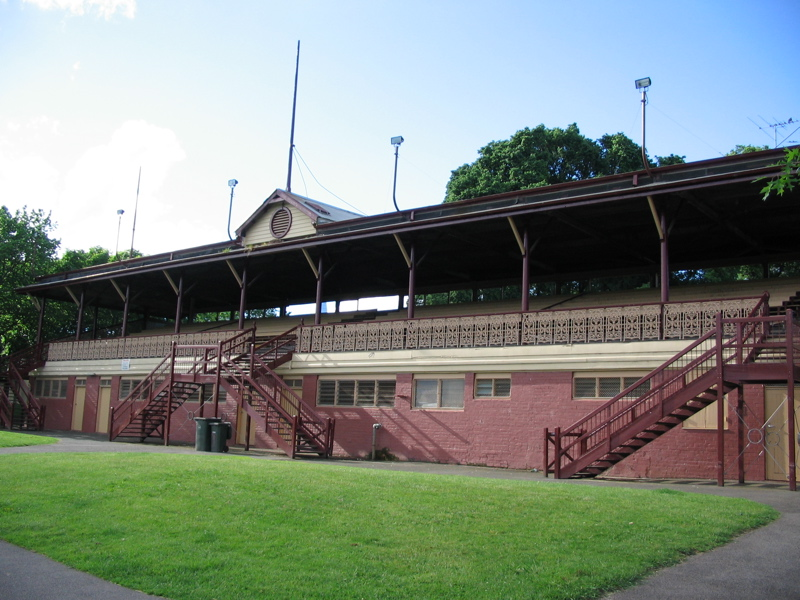
Heritage-listed grandstand at Brunswick Street Oval, used primarily for cricket and Australian rules football

Formed in 1883, the Fitzroy Football Club, an Australian rules football club, went on to play in the Victorian Football League (now known as the Australian Football League). From 1884 until 1966, Brunswick Street Oval was its primary home ground, even after the club stopped playing games at the venue, the Brunswick Street Oval still remained the primary training and administrative base of the Fitzroy Football Club in the VFL until 1970.

The club had some early success before relocating its home games several times and finally running into financial difficulties in the 1980s, forcing it to merge its AFL operations with the Brisbane Bears at the end of 1996, to form the Brisbane Lions.

The Brisbane Lions adopted a logo, song, and guernsey based on those of Fitzroy, would take eight Fitzroy players in the 1996 draft, three Fitzroy representatives would serve on the board, and the Lions would keep an office in Melbourne.

The Lions would go onto win three premierships in a row twice: in 2001, 2002, and 2003, and again in 2024,2025 and 2026, to be the most successful team of the AFL era.

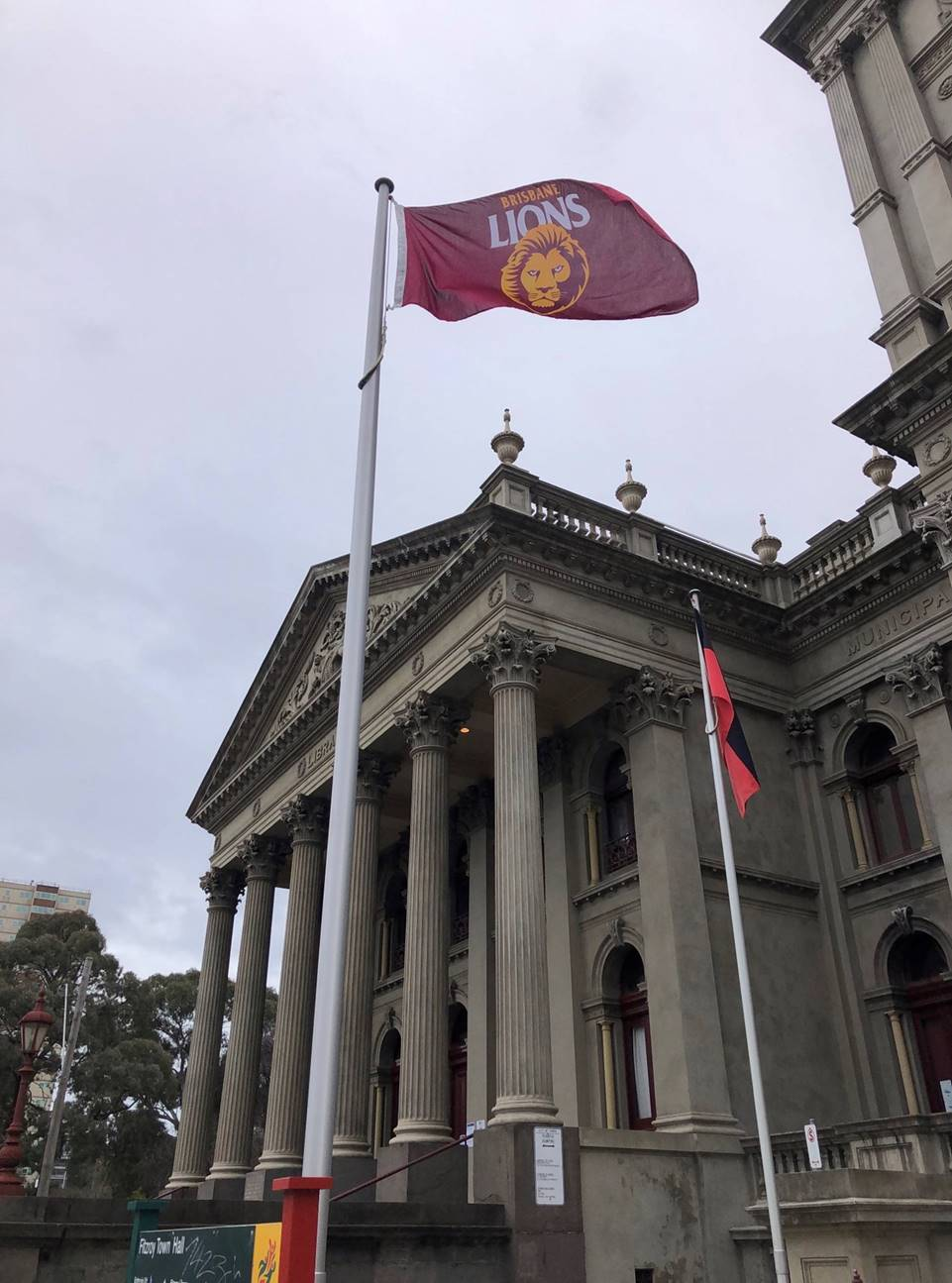
Brisbane Lions flag flying over Fitzroy Town Hall on Napier Street before the 2021 finals series

The club keeps strong ties within the Fitzroy community, keeping a social club at the Royal Derby Hotel for Victorian Lions fans, and maintaining links with the Fitzroy VAFA team by sponsoring a men's and women's player each season.

Fitzroy's non-AFL operations came out of administration after the Brisbane merger in 1998, and the clubs shareholders voted for it to continue with the goal of resuming its playing operations. After sponsoring various local clubs, Fitzroy merged with the University Reds and finally returned the playing field after a 13-year absence, participating in the 2009 Victorian Amateur Football Association season with its home games played out of Brunswick Street Oval. Since that time, Fitzroy have doubled their membership and achieved promotion twice within the VAFA. The club currently plays in the premier B division.

The Fitzroy Stars Football Club are an Indigenous club that joined the Northern Football League in 2008. They currently play their home games at Crispe Park in Reservoir with the club's off-field administration still based in Fitzroy.

Fitzroy United Alexander Football Club, now Heidelberg United, was Fitzroy's first ever sporting club to play at a national level. Founded by Melbourne's inner eastern Greek community, the club was relocated to the Brunswick Street Oval in early 1971 but later departed by late 1978. Whilst the club was based in Fitzroy, the club was initially participating in the Victorian State League where it was crowned state champions in the 1975 season. With the club's on and off-field strength, Fitzroy was invited to be an inaugural participant of the National Soccer League, the former highest level of soccer in Australia, where the club became the suburb's first national sporting team. Although administration and club training was based at Fitzroy, the club used various venues in Melbourne for its home matches. The suburb's first domestic first tier sporting match of any code was played at the Brunswick Street Oval on 2 May 1977, with Fitzroy United defeating Brisbane Lions 4–1 in front of over 4000 attendees. The club participated in the 1977 and 1978 seasons as 'Fitzroy' finishing third and fifth respectively. In late 1978, the club and its administration was relocated to Olympic Village Stadium in Heidelberg West prior to the 1979, with name being changed to Heidelberg United FC as a result of a better stadium deal and there being a larger Greek community in Heidelberg West than Fitzroy.

Fitzroy City Serbia Soccer Club, a soccer club formed in 1953 by Serbian migrants, is based in Fitzroy. The club is currently playing in the Victorian State League Division 3 South-East and play their home games at Fairfield Park, with the club's off-field administration still based in Fitzroy.

The Fitzroy Baseball Club, known as the Fitzroy Lions, is a baseball club founded in 1889 to represent Fitzroy. The club has five senior teams competing in the Baseball Victoria Summer League, as well as junior sides representing the club at every age level.

The Melbourne Chess Club, the oldest chess club in the southern hemisphere (est. 1866).

== Social and community services ==
The health needs of Fitzroy residents and other Melburnians ars served by St Vincent's Hospital.

There are two primary schools in Fitzroy: Fitzroy Primary School (government school) and Sacred Heart Primary School (Catholic school). Fitzroy High School is located in Fitzroy North. At the 2021 ARIA Music Awards, Sacred Heart School's Zoë Barry won Music Teacher of the Year.

A long tradition of community activism and civil society with many social and community service organisations having been based in Fitzroy. Organisations currently operating in the suburb include; the Fitzroy Legal Service, Yarra Community Housing Limited, Society of Saint Vincent de Paul, Brotherhood of St Laurence and the Tenants Union of Victoria, a free legal service for residential tenants.

The Atherton Gardens Resident Association advocates in the interests of the Fitzroy estate.

The Fitzroy Residents Association was formed in 1969.

== Transport ==
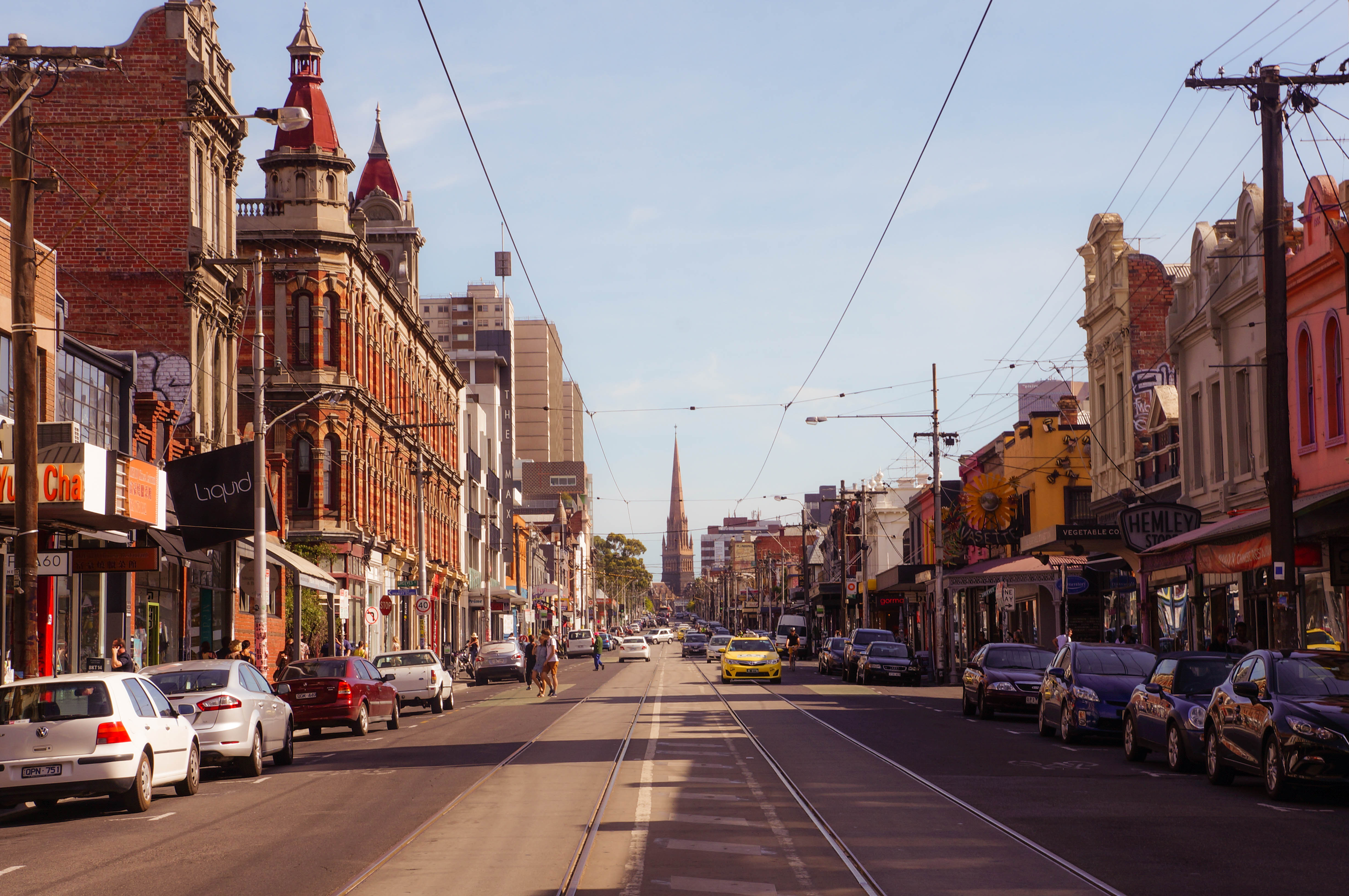
Brunswick Street

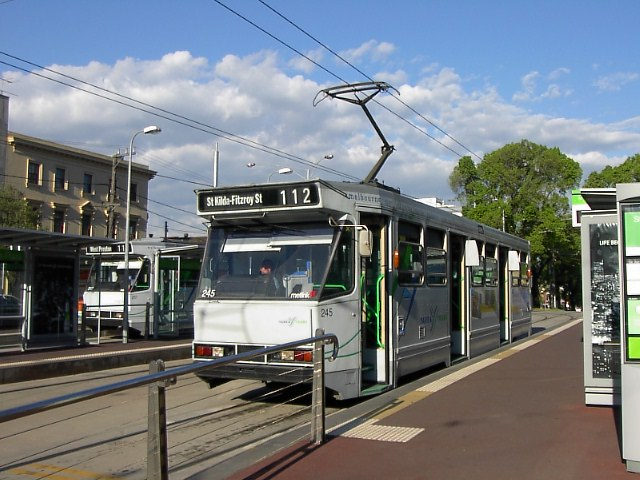
St Vincents Plaza tram interchange

Fitzroy's major road arterials are Brunswick Street (north-south) and Johnston Street (east-west). Other main roads include Victoria Parade, Nicholson Street, Smith Street and Alexandra Parade, which circumnavigate the suburb. It is characterised by a fairly tightly spaced rectangular grid of medium-sized streets, with many of its narrow streets and back lanes facilitating only one-way traffic. Traffic and parking congestion is a problem and Fitzroy and local councils have implemented strategies to keep this traffic off residential side streets. It has been the site of several controversial inner city freeway proposals, particularly in the 1950s, however none of which have proceeded.

There are no railway stations located in Fitzroy itself, with the nearest stations being Rushall in Fitzroy North, and Collingwood and Parliament Stations. There was a short-lived railway station named Fitzroy but it was just north of the actual Fitzroy suburb and was closed to passengers in 1892 (but remained open for freight until 1981). An underground railway line running between the City Loop and Clifton Hill, with stations located beneath Brunswick Street and Smith Street, has been proposed.

Three tram lines pass through Fitzroy or its boundaries:

- Route 86 (Bundoora – Docklands): travels along Nicholson Street, Gertrude Street and Smith Street.
- Route 96 (Brunswick East – St Kilda): travels along Nicholson Street.
- Route 11 (West Preston – Victoria Harbour Docklands): bisects Fitzroy along Brunswick Street.

The St Vincents Plaza tram interchange, in adjacent East Melbourne, is at the junction of Victoria Parade and Brunswick Street and handles tram routes 30, 109 and 11. It also handled tram route 24 before it was discontinued on 27 July 2014.

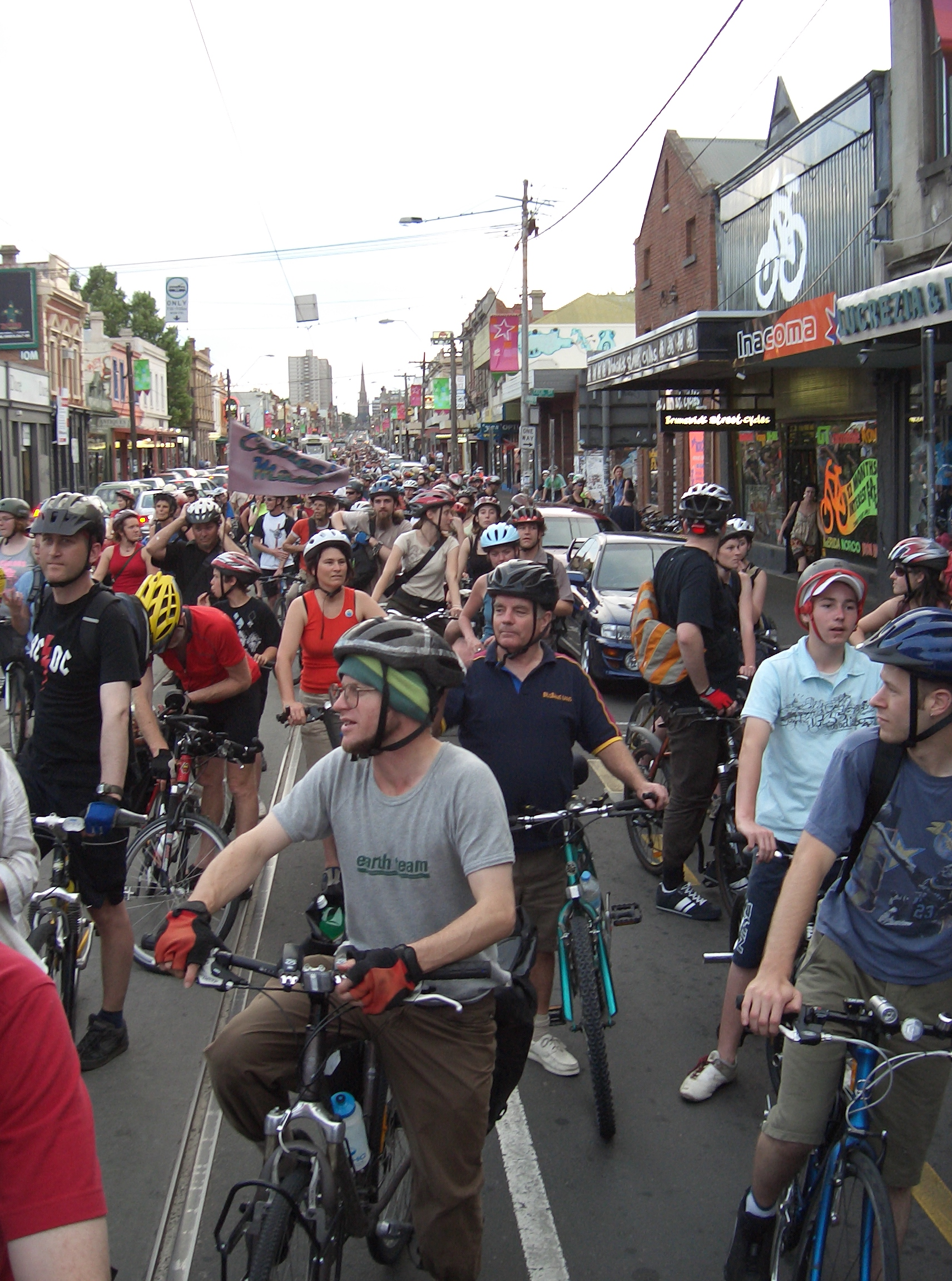
Critical Mass Melbourne at Brunswick Street

Cycling is a very popular form of transport in Fitzroy, as with much of the City of Yarra. A station for the Melbourne Bicycle Share scheme is located near the St Vincents Plaza tram interchange.

The City of Yarra also supports a car sharing service, which has several locations in Fitzroy.

== In popular culture ==
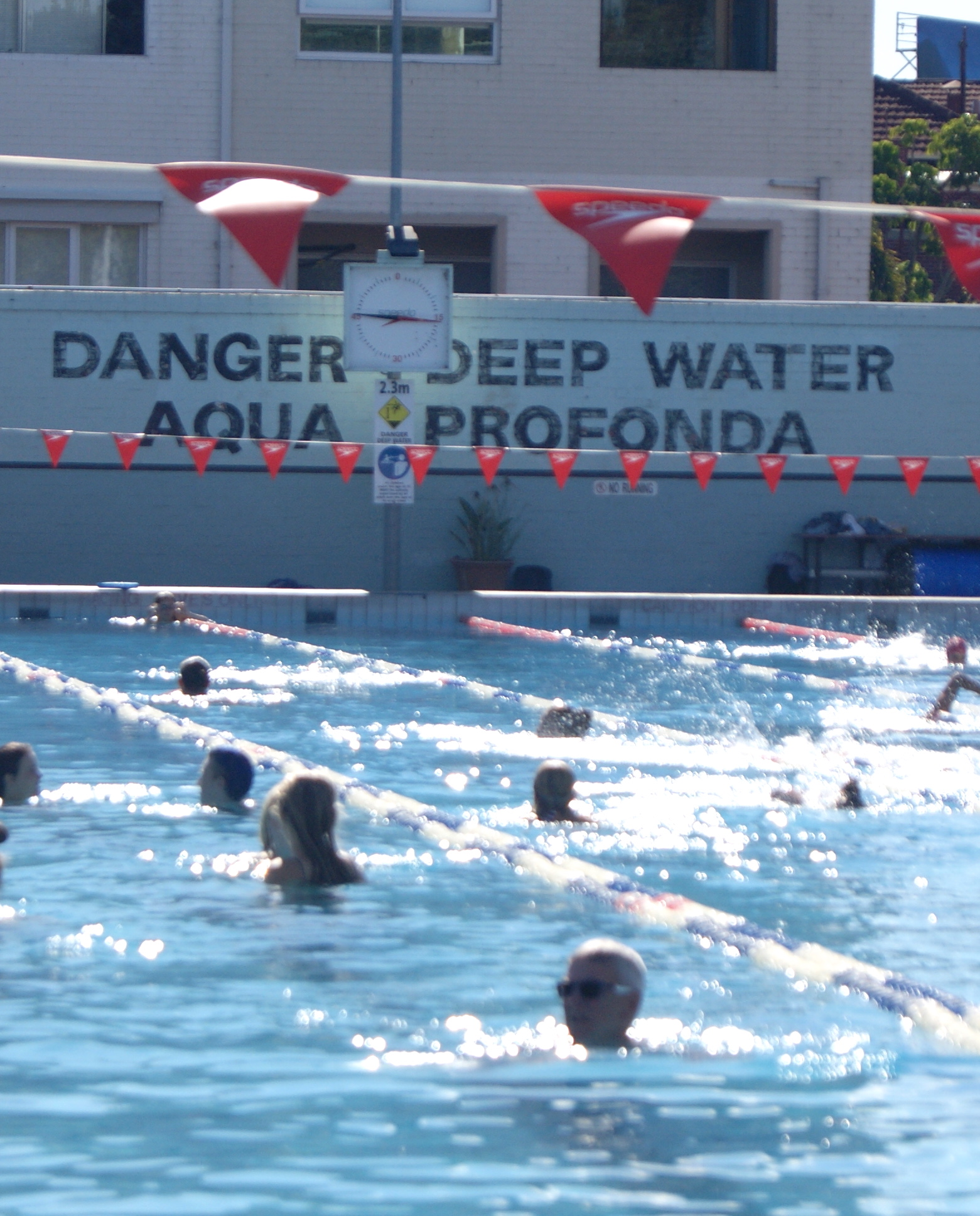
The heritage-listed "Aqua Profonda" sign made famous in Helen Garner's 1977 novel Monkey Grip.

The 1977 cult classic novel Monkey Grip by Helen Garner took place mostly in Fitzroy and Carlton. Many of the central characters frequent the Fitzroy local swimming pool in the summer, referred to as the "Fitzroy baths", and the "Aqua Profonda" sign at the deep end of the pool is the title of the novel's first chapter, used as a metaphor for the central character's deeply troubled romantic relationship with a man. The use of the sign recognised its somewhat iconic status, which was part of the basis for the sign's State level heritage listing in 2004.

The pool itself was threatened with closure in 1994, kept open by a successful and high-profile community campaign.

The 2010 Australian television show Offspring was set almost entirely in Fitzroy. The main characters of the show were often seen at the Black Cat, a Brunswick Street bar. Fitzroy has also featured in episodes of a number of Australian TV shows, including City Homicide and Rush (notably in Season 3, where the team shot at Fitzroy Town Hall to commemorate the death of a former colleague).

The movie series and television series, Jack Irish, is filmed in Fitzroy. Based on the Peter Temple novels, it features many Fitzroy cultural icons.

Australian and American musicians have made mention of Fitzroy in their lyrics, including:

- Archie Roach, in "Charcoal Lane" (1990), which mentions Gertrude Street, Brunswick Street, and other locations in Fitzroy
- Clare Bowditch, in the song "Divorcee by 23"
- Musical comedian The Bedroom Philosopher, in the song "Northcote (So Hungover)".
- American rapper Tyler, The Creator, in his song "Slater", which mentions skating to Fitzroy
- Dan Sultan's song "Old Fitzroy", the black and white video for which is shot entirely in Fitzroy, featuring shots of and from Atherton Gardens, as well as shots of a number of Fitzroy pubs
- The Distillers' song "Young Crazed Peeling", in which Brody Dalle sings about growing up in Fitzroy
- Birds of Tokyo, in their song "Good Lord" reference drinking in Fitzroy pubs.
- Gretta Ray has a song titled "When We're in Fitzroy" from her 2018 EP Here And Now.

== Notable people ==
- Harris Andrews (1996–) – Australian rules footballer
- Tony Birch (1957–) – author, academic and activist
- Francis Birtles (1881–1941) – adventurer
- Jack Cooper (1889–1917) – Australian rules footballer.
- Brody Dalle (1979–) – lead singer of The Distillers.
- Bruce Dawe (1930–2020) – poet
- Alfred Deakin (1856–1919) – second Prime Minister of Australia.
- Arthur Drakeford (1878–1957) – politician
- Florrie Forde (1875–1940) – music hall artist, popular singer and entertainer.
- E. Phillips Fox (1865–1915) – painter, associated with the Heidelberg School.
- Keith Hancock (1898–1988) – historian
- Harvey brothers – cricketing family
  - Neil Harvey (1928–) – Test cricketer, captained one Test.
  - Merv Harvey (1918–1995) – Test cricketer.
  - Ray Harvey (1926–2011) – first-class cricketer.
  - Mick Harvey (1921–2016) – first-class cricketer and Test umpire.
- Donald Alaster Macdonald (1859–1932) – journalist, nature writer and sports commentator.
- Bertram Mackennal (1863–1931) – sculptor
- Mary MacKillop (1842–1909) – Roman Catholic nun and the only Australian saint, born on Brunswick Street.
- Laurie Nash (1910–1986) – Test cricketer.
- Bert Newton (1938–2021) – television personality.
- Sir Doug Nicholls (1906–1988) – Aboriginal activist, pastor, and sportsman
- Charles Nuttall (1872–1934) – painter, cartoonist and illustrator.
- Jack O'Hagan (1898–1987) – musician
- Anne Phelan (1948–2019) – actress
- Ethel Florence Lindesay Richardson (1870–1946) – author
- Archie Roach (1956–2022) – musician
- Ben Simmons (1996–) – National Basketball Association player
- Alma Thorpe (1935–) – an Aboriginal elder
- Frank S. Williamson (1865–1936) – poet
- Louis Buvelot (1814–1888) – Swiss artist, lived in Fitzroy for 23 years
- Peter Daicos (born 1961) – AFL footballer
- Holly Valance (born 1983) – Australian Actress

== See also ==
- City of Fitzroy – Fitzroy was previously within this former local government area.
