= Mick Harvey (umpire) =

Australian cricketer and umpire (1921–2016)

Personal information
- Full name: Clarence Edgar Harvey
- Born: 17 March 1921; Newcastle, New South Wales, Australia
- Died: 6 October 2016 (aged 95); Brisbane, Queensland, Australia
- Batting: Right-handed
- Role: Opening batsman
- Relatives: Merv Harvey (brother); Ray Harvey (brother); Neil Harvey (brother); Kirby Short (granddaughter)

Domestic team information
- Years: Team
- 1948/49: Victoria
- 1949/50–1956/57: Queensland

Umpiring information
- Tests umpired: 2 (1979–1979)
- ODIs umpired: 6 (1979–1980)
- FC umpired: 31 (1975–1981)
- LA umpired: 13 (1976–1981)

Career statistics
Competition	FC
Matches	37
Runs scored	1,716
Batting average	27.23
100s/50s	3/8
Top score	111
Catches/stumpings	35/–
- Source: CricketArchive, 18 June 2010

Clarence Edgar "Mick" Harvey (17 March 1921 – 6 October 2016) was a first-class cricketer and Australian Test cricket umpire. He was the brother of Test batsmen Merv and Neil Harvey. He was born in Newcastle, New South Wales, and died in Brisbane, Queensland.

Harvey made his first-class debut in 1948–49, playing in the first three matches of the season for Victoria as an opening batsman. However, he scored only 91 runs at a batting average of 15.16, and was dropped. He moved to Queensland the following season in search of more opportunities and was selected in one match.

Harvey had his best first-class season in 1950–51, scoring 490 runs at 37.69, including his maiden first-class century against a full-strength New South Wales team with several Test bowlers. However, he struggled the following season and was dropped, and did not play a single first-class match in 1952–53. Recalled the following season, he overcame a slow start to score two centuries later in the summer to end with 421 runs at 38.27 for the summer. After a poor season, Harvey was dropped late in the 1955–56 season.

He was dropped after two matches in 1956–57, ending his first-class career. After his playing career was over, Harvey took up umpiring, and made his first-class debut in 1974–75. He regularly umpired in first-class matches over the next few seasons and then broke into international umpiring in 1978–79. In that summer, Harvey stood in two One Day Internationals (ODIs) and one Test. The following season he made his final appearances at international level, presiding over another Test and four ODIs. His last season of top-level domestic umpiring was in 1981–82 during which he officiated in two matches. He finished his career having presided over 31 first-class and 13 List A matches.

== Early years ==
Mick's father Horace "Horry" Harvey moved to Broken Hill, New South Wales, where he worked for BHP driving horse-drawn trailers. In 1914, he married Elsie May Bitmead and their first two children, daughter Rita and son Merv, were born in the mining town. The family relocated to Newcastle, a mining town and harbour in New South Wales, where Clarence Edgar Harvey—always known as Mick, as he was born on Saint Patrick's Day—and Harold were born. In 1926, the Harveys shifted to the inner-Melbourne suburb of Fitzroy, a staunchly working-class, industrial area. During their relocation, Ray was born in Sydney. Horace secured a job at the confectionery company Life Savers, located next door to their house at 198 Argyle Street. The 19th century two-storey house was owned by the firm and was used as lodgings for the workers’ families. It no longer exists, having been demolished to make way for a textile factory. The two youngest sons Neil and Brian were born in Fitzroy. The Cornish-descended Horry raised his family as strict Methodists, disallowing gambling, alcohol, tobacco and profanity in his household. An ardent cricketer, he encouraged his children to play sport. He himself played for the Rita Social Club after moving to Fitzroy.

As recreational facilities and grass ovals were sparse in densely populated Fitzroy, the boys took to playing cricket in a cobblestone laneway between their terraced house. Here they played cricket with a tennis ball, home made cricket bat and a kerosene tin for a wicket. They were usually joined by other local children, two of whom became elite sportsmen: Allan Ruthven (an Australian rules footballer) and Harold Shillinglaw (both an Australian rules footballer and first-class cricketer)—the group also played Australian rules football, kicking around rolled up cardboard and newspaper. Much of the batting skill displayed by the Harvey brothers has been attributed to these games played on the unpredictable bounce of the bumpy laneway. The surface also had a V-shaped slope inwards towards the centre of the lane, causing balls to deviate sideways after bouncing. As the laneway meant that the playing area was long and narrow, the young boys also had to learn to play the ball straight in accordance with orthodox cricket technique. The Harveys played another form of cricket in their concreted backyard using a marble instead of a ball that sharpened their reflexes, and a miniature bat. All were right-handed batsmen with the exception of Neil.

All of the children attended the nearby George Street State School and, one by one, the brothers joined the Fitzroy Cricket Club as they reached their early teens. The club had a program whereby they gave a medal for every local school to award to the best cricketer in their ranks in that year. The successful student would then be given access to all of the club's facilities. All of the Harvey brothers were recipients were of this medal. At Fitzroy, they came under the influence of former Victorian all-rounder Arthur Liddicut and the club's veteran captain Joe Plant. The Harveys had no formal coaching, and their father, although a regular presence at the club, chose to stay in the background as their respective careers developed. Horace did not advise his sons on how to bat, allowing them to formulate their own style and technique. According to the Harvey brothers, it was their mother who was vocal and extroverted, in contrast to their reserved father. The boys who failed to score runs were given kitchen duty, and according to them, their parents never showed favouritism.

During the winter, they played baseball for Fitzroy, often competing in matches played as curtain raisers to the elite Australian rules football competition, the Victorian Football League. Saturday night entertainment for the family typically consisted of dinner after the day's cricket matches for Fitzroy, and Plant, Liddicut and other cricket club personnel were often invited. Under the influence of Plant and Liddicut, the boys were taught to adopt an aggressive approach, using fast feet movement to attack spin bowling in particular.

== World War II and first-class debut ==
A printer by trade, Harvey first played in the Fitzroy First XI in 1938–39. Mick opened the batting with Merv, and in 1942–43, when Neil broke into the First XI, the family occupied the first four batting positions for the team; Merv and Mick opened and Ray and Neil came in after them. During World War II, Harvey enlisted in the Second Australian Imperial Force at Fitzroy on 4 March 1943 and was a member of the 39th Infantry Battalion and went on to serve in Kokoda. He was discharged on 29 March 1946 with the rank of private. He resumed cricket with Fitzroy after the war's end and made enough runs to be selected for Victoria's first three Sheffield Shield matches of the 1948–49 season. Playing as an opening batsman, he made 10 and 13 on debut against Queensland, and was trapped leg before wicket (lbw) in both innings in an eight-wicket win. In the next match against New South Wales, who boasted Australia's new ball opening bowlers Ray Lindwall and Keith Miller, Harvey made 19 and 33 in a drawn match. In the subsequent match against South Australia, he made 4 and 12, again being trapped lbw in both innings. The 1948–49 season was purely domestic with no touring Test team, so all of Australia's international representatives were available for the whole season. Having scored only 91 runs at a batting average of 15.16, Harvey was dropped from the team. He did not play alongside Ray, who was dropped, and Merv, who had retired. It was Harvey's last season for Fitzroy, and in 90 first-grade matches, he scored 2,601 runs at an average of 30.24.

== Move to Queensland ==
At the time, Queensland were the least successful team in the Sheffield Shield, and Harvey moved north to Brisbane the following season to try to get more opportunities to play Sheffield Shield cricket. Harvey joined the Toombul grade club, and made his first-class debut for Queensland against Victoria late in the season, although none of his brothers played for Victoria in this match; Merv had already retired, Neil was representing Australia, and Ray had been dropped. In his only match for the summer, he scored 1 and 13 and took two catches in each innings as an opener. He was dropped after the match.

In 1950–51, his most prolific first-class season, he hit 490 runs at 37.69 for Queensland. The season started with consecutive matches against a full-strength New South Wales, who had an attack including Lindwall, Miller, Alan Walker and Alan Davidson. In the first match, in Brisbane, Harvey made 40 and 19 batting at No. 7 before being dismissed by Davidson and Lindwall respectively. The visitors won by an innings.

In the return match at the Sydney Cricket Ground, Harvey was promoted to bat at No. 3. He made 38 in the first innings before being dismissed by Walker. Harvey broke through for his maiden first-class century in the second innings, scoring an unbeaten 100. Queensland declared at 4/237 as soon as he reached his milestone, only to see the hosts reach the victory target of 225 with all ten wickets intact.

Harvey played against an international outfit for the first time in the following match against the touring England cricket team, but made only three in his solitary innings. However, he continued to score consistently, making a half-century in each of the next three matches. From the third of these matches—against South Australia—onwards, he generally opened the batting for Queensland. On his first innings back as an opener, he narrowly missed a century, being dismissed for 95 by Geff Noblet. However, it was enough for the Queenslanders to take a 162-run first innings lead in a low-scoring match in which only one team surpassed 240 once, and set up an eight-wicket victory, the only time his state won a match for the season. Harvey's performance tapered away in the last two matches of the season. He made only 0 and 2 in the last match against Victoria, and 48 runs in his last four innings.

Harvey started the 1951–52 season poorly, scoring 9 and 5 against a full-strength New South Wales team. In the following match, he made 90 in the first innings as Queensland defeated the touring West Indies by ten wickets. Harvey was sidelined for six weeks before returning in late December against Victoria. He struggled in this match and the next against New South Wales, scoring 9, 20, 9 and 3. In the next match, he made 46 in the first innings before managing only five in the second, against South Australia. Nor did Queensland have success in these three matches. They were one wicket away from victory in the first match when time ran out, and lost the other two. Harvey was dropped for the remainder of the season, ending with 196 runs at 21.77.

Harvey was overlooked for Queensland selection for the whole 1952–53 season. He was recalled at the start of the 1953–54 campaign and made 26 and 20 in the first match against New South Wales, failing to convert his starts into big scores. He was retained despite making 15 and 0 in the next match against Victoria, but scored only 1 in the first innings of the match against South Australia starting on Christmas Day. Victoria were set 329 for victory, and having made only 62 runs in five innings for the season so far, he was the mainstay of the innings, scoring 102, but his team were all out for 245.

The century saw Harvey retained in the side and started a productive second half of the season. He made 2 and 58 in the next match starting on New Year's Day, against New South Wales. Harvey then made 84 in the only innings of a drawn match against Victoria, before scoring 111 in an innings win against Western Australia. It was the first time in over two years that Harvey had played in a victorious Queensland side. He made only 2 in the final match of the season against South Australia to end with 421 runs at 38.27 for the summer.

== Decline ==
Harvey continued his good form at the start of the 1954–55 season, scoring 90 and 9 in the opening match against New South Wales. He then made 49 and 9 against the touring England cricket team of Len Hutton. In the Christmas match against South Australia, Harvey failed to capitalise on his starts, making 31 and 35 as Queensland won by 34 runs. The following week, he made only 0 and 3 not out in the New Year's match against New South Wales. He finished the truncated season with only 16 in the following match against Victoria, ending the summer with 242 runs at 30.25.

Harvey had a poor season in 1955–56. He scored only 37 runs in six completed innings in the first three matches. In the next match against Western Australia, he made only 8 in the first innings but scored 70 not out in the second innings as his team's run-chase petered away to a draw, and he retained his position in the team. He then made 17 and 28 in the next match against South Australia, run out in the latter innings after making a start. After making 10 and 20 in the next match against New South Wales, he was dropped for the remainder of the season, having made only 190 runs at 17.27 for the season.

Recalled at the start of the 1956–57 season, Harvey made 40 and 28 in his first match of the summer against New South Wales, but after scoring only 2 and 2 not out against Western Australia in the next match, he was dropped for the final time.

Noted for his sound defence, he was a patient and dogged batsman, in contrast to the exciting styles of brothers Merv, Ray and Neil. According to Neil, Mick had a weakness against spin bowling. Harvey was a rare bowler during his first-class career. He bowled only five overs in total, delivering one over in five different matches. He never took a wicket. Altogether, he made 1,716 first-class runs (mostly as an opener) in 37 matches at an average of 27.23. Harvey was also a regular choice for the Queensland baseball team during his career. His daughter Pauline Harvey-Short represented Australia at softball, before becoming a sports administrator. She is a fellow of the Australian Council for Health, Physical Education and Recreation, and was a founding member of Womensport Queensland in 1993, serving as the chair of the board from 2007 until 2010. Her daughter Kirby Short plays cricket for the Queensland women's team.

== Umpiring career ==
After his retirement as a player, Harvey took up umpiring. His initial first-class match was in 1974–75, when he officiated in Queensland's home match against Victoria late in the season; at the time the host team provided both umpires. The following year, he was selected for four first-class matches, one of which was against the touring West Indies. He also officiated in his first List A match, presiding over the final of the Australian domestic limited-overs cricket tournament, which Queensland hosted against Western Australia. The following two seasons were similar; Harvey stood in four first-class matches including one against a touring international team, and one List A match, both of which were quarter-finals.

In 1978–79, Harvey's appointments increased. Harvey stood in all of Queensland's five home Shield matches, as well as their match against the touring Englishmen. He stood in one List A match involving Queensland and was then rewarded with his international debut in the second ODI between Australia and England at the SCG, before presiding over the next ODI at the Melbourne Cricket Ground (MCG). At the end of the season, Harvey was selected for the first of his two Tests. The first, played by Australia against Pakistan at the MCG in March 1979 was dramatic. During the run-chase, the Australians were stunned by a spell of 7 wickets for 1 run by Sarfraz Nawaz, just when they looked like winning. Sarfraz ended with 9/86—the other wicket was run out—as Australia collapsed from 3/305 to 310 all out to lose by 71 runs. Harvey's partner was Robin Bailhache.

Harvey's other Test match was between Australia and the West Indies at the MCG during the Christmas-New Year period of 1979–80. It was won by the visitors by 10 wickets, with a bowling attack of Andy Roberts, Michael Holding, Colin Croft, and Joel Garner proving too powerful for the hosts. Harvey's on-field colleague in the match was Tony Crafter. Harvey also stood in four ODIs played during the inaugural World Series Cup that season, which involved England, Australia and the West Indies. He presided in three of the round-robin matches, the third of which was between the two visiting teams at the Gabba. It was the only time that Harvey umpired a match at his adopted home ground. He later presided over the first match of the finals series, between the West Indies and England at the MCG. This was his sixth and final appointment at ODI level. Harvey also officiated three Shield matches, Queensland's tour match against England and one of their domestic one-dayers during the season.

The following season, Harvey presided over four of the five home Shield matches, a tour match by India, and a domestic one-dayer, but was overlooked for an international fixture. Harvey's final fixtures were during the 1981–82 season. He officiated in two matches hosted by Queensland in November, a Shield match and a one-dayer, both against Queensland. Altogether, he umpired 31 first-class and 13 List A matches in his career. He continued to umpire interstate matches at youth level until 1988 and stood in six finals the first grade of Queensland's local competition.
