= Merv Harvey =

Australian cricketer

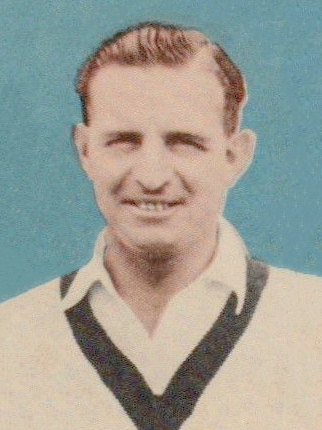
- Harvey in about 1948

Personal information
- Full name: Mervyn Roye Harvey
- Born: 29 April 1918; Broken Hill, New South Wales, Australia
- Died: 18 March 1995 (aged 76) (Note: Both CricInfo and CricketArchive give Harvey's date of death as 18 March. Wisden, in its obituary, gave the date he died as 20 March.); Footscray, Victoria, Australia
- Batting: Right-handed
- Relatives: Mick Harvey (brother); Ray Harvey (brother); Neil Harvey (brother); Robert Harvey (grandson); Anthony Harvey (grandson)

International information
- National side: Australia
- Only Test (cap 175): 31 January 1947 v England

Domestic team information
- Years: Team
- 1940/41–1948/49: Victoria

Career statistics
Competition	Test	First-class
Matches	1	22
Runs scored	43	1147
Batting average	21.50	38.23
100s/50s	0/0	3/3
Top score	31	163
Catches/stumpings	0/–	11/–
- Source: Cricinfo, 23 May 2022

Mervyn Roye Harvey (29 April 1918 – 18 March 1995) was a cricketer who played in one Test match for Australia in 1947. His younger brother, Neil, was one of Australia's finest batsmen, and the pair played together for Victoria during the latter part of Merv's career.

Merv Harvey broke into the Victorian state team during the 1940–41 season and played in three first-class matches. The highlight of the first phase of his career for Victoria was a rapid 70 in one hour against a New South Wales attack containing Bill O'Reilly, regarded as the best bowler in the world at the time. However, the outbreak of World War II in the Pacific caused the suspension of top-level cricket and halted Harvey's progress. Harvey then served in the Royal Australian Air Force as an airframe fitter, losing his best cricketing years to the war.

An opening batsman, Harvey was described by Neil as "the greatest cricketer of us all" and known for his attacking style and penchant for hooking fast bowlers. He was initially overlooked for Victorian selection after cricket resumed in 1945–46, before being recalled for the final match of the season, and he responded by scoring a career-best 163. He was a regular member of the Victorian team during the 1946–47 season, and although he faced much competition for national selection as Australia had an abundance of quality openers at the time, he was selected for his only Test during the fourth Test of the season against England at the Adelaide Oval when both Bill Brown and Sid Barnes were injured. Harvey made 12 and 31 before being dropped immediately due to Barnes' recovery.

In 1947–48, Harvey played with younger brothers Neil and Ray in two matches for Victoria, captaining the team in the second of these fixtures. However, his own form began to wane and he was dropped from the team midway through the season. In 1948–49, Harvey remained outside the first-choice team, and played in only two first-class matches against Tasmania when Victoria fielded a second-string team. He retired at the end of the season, having played only 22 first-class matches in an interrupted career. Harvey captained his state five times during the post-war phase of his career, standing in when regular captain Lindsay Hassett was away on national duty.

== Early years ==
Merv Harvey was born in Broken Hill, New South Wales to Horace "Horrie" and Elsie Harvey. Horace worked for BHP driving horse-drawn trailers. Merv was the second child in the family and the oldest son. Five younger brothers were to follow, in chronological order Mick, Harold, Ray, Neil and Brian. The family relocated to Newcastle, a mining town and harbour in New South Wales, before shifting to the inner-Melbourne suburb of Fitzroy, a staunchly working-class, industrial area. Horace secured a job at the confectionery company Life Savers, located next door to their house at 198 Argyle Street. The 19th century two-storey house was owned by the firm and was used as lodgings for the workers' families. It no longer exists, having been demolished to make way for a textile factory.

The Cornish-descended Horace raised his family as strict Methodists, disallowing gambling, alcohol, tobacco and profanity in his household. An ardent cricketer during his years in New South Wales, he was good enough to hit 196 runs during a match in Newcastle, and he encouraged his children to play sport. He himself played for the Rita Social Club after moving to Fitzroy.

As recreational facilities and grass ovals were sparse in densely populated Fitzroy, Merv and his younger brothers played cricket in a cobblestone laneway between their terraced house. Here they played cricket with a tennis ball, home made cricket bat and a kerosene tin for a wicket. They were usually joined by other local children, two of whom became elite sportsmen: Allan Ruthven and Harold Shillinglaw. The group also played Australian rules football, kicking around rolled up cardboard and newspaper. Much of the batting skill displayed by the Harvey brothers has been attributed to these games played on the unpredictable bounce of the bumpy laneway. The surface also had a V-shaped slope inwards towards the centre of the lane, causing balls to deviate sideways after bouncing. As the laneway meant that the playing area was long and narrow, the young boys also had to learn to play the ball straight in accordance with orthodox cricket technique. The Harveys played another form of cricket in their concreted backyard using a marble instead of a ball, and a miniature bat. This sharpened their reflexes.

Merv was the first of the brothers to attend the nearby George Street State School and join the Fitzroy Cricket Club as they reached their early teens. The club had a program whereby they gave a medal for every local school to award to the best cricketer in their ranks in that year. The successful student would then be given access to all of the club's facilities. All of the Harvey brothers were recipients were of this medal. At Fitzroy, they came under the influence of former Victorian all-rounder Arthur Liddicut and the club's veteran captain Joe Plant. Merv and his younger siblings had no formal coaching, and their father, a regular presence at the club, chose to stay in the background as their respective careers developed. Horace did not advise his sons on how to bat, allowing them to formulate their own style and technique. According to the brothers, it was their mother who was vocal and extroverted, in contrast to their reserved father. The boys who failed to score runs were given kitchen duty, and according to them, their parents never showed favouritism.

During the winter, they played baseball for Fitzroy Baseball Club, often competing in matches played as curtain raisers to the elite Australian rules football competition, the Victorian Football League. Saturday night entertainment for the family typically consisted of dinner after the day's cricket matches for Fitzroy, and Plant, Liddicut and other cricket club personnel were often invited. Under the influence of Plant and Liddicut, the boys were taught to adopt an aggressive approach, using fast feet movement to attack spin bowling in particular. In 1932, Harvey captained the Victorian Under-15 schoolboys team on a tour of Queensland and one of his players was future Victorian and Australian teammate Keith Miller. Harvey graduated to Fitzroy's first XI in 1933–34.

== First-class beginnings ==
During the 1938–39 season, Harvey was selected for the Victorian Second XI to play in a match against their counterparts from New South Wales. Harvey was run out for four in the first innings and then made eight as his team succumbed to a 227-run defeat. As a result, he was not called up into the First XI for the next two years.

Harvey made his first-class debut for Victoria against Queensland at the Gabba in 1940–41. In the first innings, he made 25 before being caught by wicket-keeper Don Tallon from the bowling of Jack Ellis as the visitors took first innings points in a drawn match. In the next match, he made an impression. After making 35 in the first innings, he scored 70 in an hour's batting in the second innings at the Sydney Cricket Ground (SCG) against New South Wales. In both innings, he was dismissed by leg spinner Bill O'Reilly, the leading bowler in the world, but Victoria managed to prevail by 24 runs. The teams met again three weeks later, and this time, New South Wales turned the table, winning by 235 runs. Harvey made 14 in the first innings, bowled by O'Reilly for the second innings in a row. In the second innings he made 38 before being removed by another leg spinner, Cec Pepper. Harvey ended the season with 182 runs at 36.40.

Harvey enlisted in the Royal Australian Air Force at Fitzroy on 12 May 1942 and was a member of the 30 Squadron. He served as an airframe fitter during World War II, which severely interrupted his sporting career, and first-class cricket was cancelled after the Japanese bombing of Pearl Harbor prompted the outbreak of hostilities in the Pacific. He was discharged on 25 January 1946 with the rank of aircraftman. According to cricket administrator Bill Jacobs, the war cost Harvey his prime cricketing years. Jacobs believed that Harvey would have been selected for Australia in the period otherwise interrupted by war.

== Post-war resumption and only Test ==
After the war ended in 1945, first-class cricket resumed in 1945–46. Harvey played in a trial match for state selection. Playing for the Rest of Victoria against the first-choice state team, he made 82 and 25. This was not enough to convince the state selectors and Harvey did not get a recall to the Victorian team until the end of the season when he played against South Australia at the Adelaide Oval. He responded by striking a career-best 163 to help his team to an innings win.

Immediately after the war, Harvey faced a lot of competition for a place as an opening batsman in the Australian team, but a vacancy arose in 1946–47, when Bill Brown, who had captained Australia the previous season and opened for the country in Tests in the 1930s, was sidelined with injury for the whole summer.

In the first match of the season, Harvey's Victorians faced the touring England cricket team led by Wally Hammond. In the first innings, Harvey made 21 of the team's 189 before being caught and bowled by leg spinner Doug Wright. He then made 57 before being dismissed by Alec Bedser as the hosts fell for only 204 in pursuit of 449 for victory, losing by 244 runs.

This was enough for him to be selected in the Australian XI for a match against the Englishmen, in what was effectively a Test dress rehearsal. Rain curtailed the match, and the game did not reach the second innings; Harvey made 22 in his only opportunity.

There was another match for Victoria against South Australia before the Tests, allowing him another chance to push his claim for national selection. It was also his first Sheffield Shield match; his previous appearances for Victoria in interstate games were in seasons where the competition was called off due to war and replaced by one-off matches. Harvey could manage only 9 as Victoria amassed 548 in their first innings. They needed 79 runs for victory in 35 minutes on the last afternoon, and with quick scoring required, the more aggressive Keith Miller opened in place of Harvey. When the first wicket fell with the target almost completed, Harvey came in and made three not out by the time the match was over. These performances were not enough for the Australian selectors and Harvey was overlooked for the team for the first two Tests.

After this, Harvey had two opportunities to press for selection for the next Test. He made 13 in an innings victory over Queensland and continued to be overlooked. The second match was the Shield clash with arch-rivals New South Wales, which started on Boxing Day at the Melbourne Cricket Ground. After the visitors had made 205, Harvey opened with Ken Meuleman, who was out at 1/31, bringing Miller to the crease. Miller hammered the bowling and Victoria were 1/154 at the end of the day. The next day, the 271-run partnership ended after just over three hours when Miller fell at 2/302. Harvey went on to make 136 in what was generally regarded as his best innings. He famously hooked leading Australian paceman Ray Lindwall, the fastest in the world at the time, over the fence into the public bar for six. It was one of the few occasions that Lindwall was hit for six in his long career. Victoria declared at 8/560, Test bowlers Lindwall and Ernie Toshack taking the most punishment with figures of 1/100 and 0/133 from 18 and 21 overs respectively, as Victoria went on to win by an innings and 114 runs.

In the return match against Queensland, Harvey made 17 as Victoria took a convincing innings win. In the next match against New South Wales, Harvey played with Neil for the first time at first-class level, and pair played together for their state's two remaining matches of the season, although they never batted together as Merv was always out before Neil came in, usually at No. 6. Merv made 30 and 44, failing to capitalise on his starts to make a big score with a Test vacancy beckoning; incumbent opener Sid Barnes was injured and unavailable for the Fourth Test.

Nevertheless, Harvey was selected to play his only Test, the Fourth Test at Adelaide, filling in for the injured Barnes. England batted first and made 460 before being dismissed late on the second day. Harvey opened with Arthur Morris, and made 12 in the first innings before being bowled by Bedser while playing an aggressive shot. With only a few minutes of play left, the Australian captain Don Bradman came in and he too was bowled by Bedser, without scoring a run. Harvey later privately said the Bradman had told him to play cautiously and survive until the end of the day, rather than attack, and that the captain was angry with the resulting two wickets. According to Harvey, Bradman told him that he would never be selected for Australia again. The tourists then declared during the last afternoon and left Australia a target of 314. The target was not a realistic offer and Morris and Harvey put on an opening stand of 116 before the latter was bowled for 31 by the medium pace of occasional bowler Norman Yardley. The match ended in a draw with Australia on 1/215.

Barnes recovered and resumed his position for the Fifth Test. Harvey ended his season by scoring 10 in his only innings of Victoria's second tour match against England, which was drawn, and was 3 not out in the first innings of the Shield match against South Australia when it was washed out. Harvey made his captaincy debut in the latter match as Lindsay Hassett was representing Australia in the Fifth Test, and his bowlers dismissed South Australia for 222 in Victoria's only innings in the field. This washed-out drawn match was the only time in six Shield matches during the season that Victoria did not emerge victorious, and they won the competition. Harvey ended the season with 405 runs at 33.75.

== Final seasons ==
By 1947–48, Brown had recovered, so Harvey had to compete with him as well as Morris and Barnes for selection. In the first match of the season against the touring Indians, Harvey made 4 and 35. The following week, he made 89 in the first innings against South Australia but managed only three in the second innings as the Victorians collapsed to be all out for 182 and lost by nine wickets. Harvey was overlooked for the Australian XI for the Test trial against India the following week. Instead, he played in the match against Queensland, scoring only 13 and 3. He was subsequently overlooked for the Test selection. During this time, he played alongside Neil in all but the Queensland match, when his younger brother was playing in the Australian XI. However, neither batted together.

Neil returned to the Victorian team for the match against New South Wales at the SCG the following week, and Ray was selected to make his first-class debut, so three Harveys were in the state team for the first time. Merv opened, while Neil and Ray batted at Nos. 4 and 7 respectively. Victoria batted first and the brothers again did not form any partnerships. Merv opened and made 45 as Victoria ended with 331; the Harvey brothers had scored almost half the runs. New South Wales were forced to follow on, and Victoria were set 51 for victory. After the fall of Fred Freer at 1/24, captain Lindsay Hassett elevated Ray to No. 3, allowing two Harveys to bat together for the first time at first-class level. Ray and Merv put on an unbeaten partnership of 27 to take Victoria to a nine-wicket win. Merv and Ray ended unbeaten on 12 and 22 respectively.

The trio then proceeded to play together in the next match against Western Australia two weeks later and Merv captained the team as Hassett was away on Test duty. Victoria batted first and Neil came in to join Merv with the score at 2/102, and the pair added 173 together before the younger brother fell for 94. One run later, Merv was out for 141 in what turned out to be his final first-class century; later, Ray made only 1. Victoria ended on 370 and Western Australia took a 59-run lead. In the second innings, Merv made 6 and did not bat with his brothers. He declared the innings at 9/304, setting Western Australia a target of 246 for victory. They reached 5/205 and Victoria avoided defeat. A fortnight later, Harvey again captained the team and made a duck in his only innings in a rain-curtailed match. After the Victorians had made 412, Queensland reached 5/144 at the end of the match. Despite being the captain, Harvey was dropped for the next match and was overlooked for the rest of the season, ending with 351 runs at 35.10.

After being dropped for the second half of the previous season, Harvey had even less opportunities in 1948–49. His only matches for Victoria came during the Christmas period, when he played consecutive fixtures, both against Tasmania. Although the two games had first-class status, they were effectively Second XI fixtures, as the first-choice team was playing Sheffield Shield matches at the same time. Victoria only batted once in each innings and Harvey made 7 and 36 respectively. Harvey captained the team, and they dominated both matches. The Victorians took a first-innings lead of 171 in the first match, but rain interruptions ended the match with Tasmania at 1/100 in their second innings, still 71 runs in arrears. In the second match, Victoria dismissed their opponents for 65 in the first innings to take a lead of 309 runs and they went on to win by an innings and 73 runs. Having seen his previous four matches as captain end in a draw, Harvey ended his first-class career with his only victory as a leader in his final match.

Harvey continued playing in the First XI for Fitzroy until 1954–55, and he finished with 6,654 runs at 29.31 in 207 First XI matches for the club. Harvey was an attacking opening batsman, strong on the drive and fond of hooking fast bowling. His brother Neil called him "the greatest cricketer of us all".

== Outside cricket ==
Harvey worked for more than five decades for the same engineering firm, and lived with his wife Myrtle in the western industrial suburb of Footscray. He had two sons, Jeff and Graeme, both of whom played in first grade for Fitzroy. His grandson Robert Harvey—son of Jeff—was one of the leading Australian rules footballers of the 1990s and the early 21st century. Robert made his Australian Football League debut for St Kilda Football Club in 1988 and played 21 seasons. He was a member of the All-Australian team eight times and won the Brownlow Medal twice, in 1997 and 1998, for the best and fairest player. Robert played cricket for Victoria at Under-19 level as a bowler, but he was already playing top-flight football at the time and gave up his cricket career after the national Under-19 tournament. Another grandson Anthony, the younger brother of Robert, also played for St Kilda and captained Norwood to the 1997 South Australian National Football League (SANFL) premiership.
