= Anthony Harvey (footballer) =

Australian rules footballer

Personal information
- Full name: Anthony Harvey
- Born: 25 May 1973 (age 53)
- Original team: Frankston
- Height: 176 cm (5 ft 9 in)
- Weight: 77 kg (170 lb)
- Position: Midfield

Playing career^{1}
Years	Club	Games (Goals)
1994	St Kilda	4 (1)
1995–2004	Norwood	122 (105)
- ^{1} Playing statistics correct to the end of 1994.

Career highlights
- SANFL premiership captain: 1997; Norwood Best and Fairest: 1998

Anthony Harvey (born 25 May 1973) is a former Australian rules footballer who played with St Kilda in the Australian Football League (AFL) and Norwood in the South Australian National Football League (SANFL).

Harvey comes from a famous sporting family with his grandfather Merv Harvey and granduncle Neil Harvey both being Australian Test cricket representatives. His brother Robert is St Kilda's games record holder.

A midfielder, Harvey was recruited to St Kilda from Frankston and his four AFL appearances consisted of just one win, against Fitzroy at Waverley Park. His best performance came in the last of those games, when he kicked his only career goal and managed 23 disposals against that year's Grand Final runners-up Geelong.

The next chapter of his football career was spent in South Australia where he played for Norwood, which he captained to the 1997 premiership when regular skipper Garry McIntosh was unavailable due to a suspension. Harvey again captained Norwood for part of the 1998 season, the same year which he won his club's 'Best and Fairest'. After McIntosh retired he was appointed to the captaincy full-time in 1999, a role he would keep through to the end of the 2001 season. His stint included the losing SANFL Grand Final team of 1999.

== See also ==
- Harvey family
