= Peter Trethewey =

Australian cricketer and businessman

Personal information
- Full name: Peter Grant Trethewey
- Born: 12 May 1935 (age 91); Croydon, Adelaide, South Australia
- Batting: Right-handed
- Bowling: Right-arm fast-medium

Domestic team information
- Years: Team
- 1957–58 to 1960–61: South Australia
- 1962–63: Queensland

Career statistics
Competition	First-class
Matches	28
Runs scored	79
Batting average	3.43
100s/50s	0/0
Top score	13*
Balls bowled	6,283
Wickets	92
Bowling average	28.48
5 wickets in innings	6
10 wickets in match	1
Best bowling	7/69
Catches/stumpings	10/0
- Source: Cricinfo, 18 April 2025

Peter Grant Trethewey (born 12 May 1935) is a former Australian cricketer. He played in 28 first-class matches for South Australia and Queensland between 1957 and 1963. He migrated to the United States, where he founded a hotel chain.

== Life and career ==
Born in Adelaide, Trethewey attended Adelaide Technical High School and trained as a mechanic.

A right-arm fast-medium bowler, Trethewey's best figures were 7 for 69 and 3 for 53 in South Australia's victory over Victoria in the 1957–58 Sheffield Shield. He took 6 for 53 when South Australia dismissed the touring West Indians for 143 in November 1960.

Trethewey was one of several Australian bowlers at the time whose actions were widely considered to be suspect, although he was never no-balled for throwing. He tried to amend his action to make it more acceptable, but lost form as a consequence.

After his cricket career, Trethewey pursued a successful business career in California. He founded the Greystone Hotel chain, which operates hotels in California and Oregon. He also owned a vineyard in Sonoma.
