= Harold Shillinglaw =

Australian rules footballer and cricketer

Personal information
- Born: 2 December 1927; Melbourne, Victoria
- Died: 15 April 2016 (aged 88); Melbourne
- Original team: Collingwood Tech
- Height: 175 cm (5 ft 9 in)
- Weight: 67 kg (148 lb)

Playing career^{1}
Years	Club	Games (Goals)
1945–1951	Fitzroy	63 (19)
- ^{1} Playing statistics correct to the end of 1951.

Harold Arthur Edward Shillinglaw (2 December 1927 – 15 April 2016) was an Australian rules footballer who played for Fitzroy in the Victorian Football League (VFL).

Shillinglaw was brought up in Fitzroy and made his debut for their football club in the 1945 VFL season. The Collingwood Tech recruit ended up playing 63 games over seven seasons with Fitzroy.

He also had a brief first-class cricket career, playing three matches for Victoria between 1949–50 and 1953–54, taking 8 wickets at 20.25 with his right-arm medium pace bowling and scoring 88 runs at 17.60.

Shillinglaw played 157 first eleven games of Melbourne District Cricket for Fitzroy Cricket Club between 1943 and 1960.

Shillinglaw also played for Fitzroy in the Melbourne Major Baseball LEague in 1956. On 16 June 1956 he was noted to hit a home run in a tied game against Prahan.

== Links ==
- Harold Shillinglaw's playing statistics from AFL Tables
- List of Victoria first-class cricketers
- Cricinfo profile
- Harold Shillinglaw at CricketArchive (subscription required)
