= Charlie Puckett =

Australian sportsman

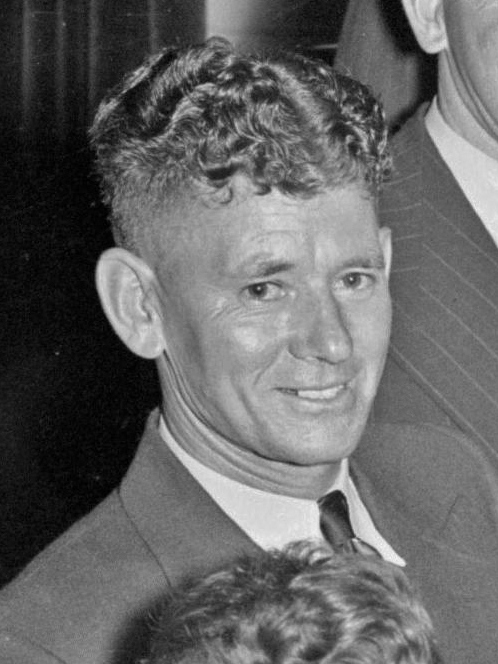
- Puckett in 1948

Personal information
- Full name: Charles William Puckett
- Born: 21 February 1911; Beddington Corner, Surrey, England
- Died: 21 January 2002 (aged 90); Morphett Vale, South Australia, Australia
- Nickname: "Iron Man"
- Batting: Right-handed
- Bowling: Right-arm fast-medium
- Role: Bowler
- Relatives: MC Puckett (son)

Domestic team information
- Years: Team
- 1940–1953: Western Australia

Career statistics
Competition	First-class
Matches	37
Runs scored	643
Batting average	14.61
100s/50s	0/1
Top score	75
Balls bowled	10,508
Wickets	158
Bowling average	25.58
5 wickets in innings	14
10 wickets in match	2
Best bowling	6/35
Catches/stumpings	24/-
- Source: CricketArchive, 16 November 2012

Charles William Puckett (21 February 1911 – 21 January 2002) was an Australian sportsman who excelled at both baseball and cricket. Born in Surrey, England, Puckett emigrated with his family to Adelaide, South Australia, and took up playing both sports early in life. Playing baseball as both a catcher and a pitcher, he represented South Australia in the Claxton Shield on several occasions, and was also the winner of the inaugural Capps Medal as the best player in the South Australian Baseball League. He moved to Victoria in 1937, playing a season for the Essendon Baseball Club and also playing state baseball for Victoria, before moving to Western Australia the following year to work in the publishing house of The West Australian. Considered one of the best all-round baseballers in Australia, Puckett subsequently represented Western Australia in the Claxton Shield competition, winning the award for best player on three consecutive occasions, in the 1936, 1937, and 1938 tournaments.

From 1940, he began to also play cricket for Western Australia, as a fast bowler. He enlisted in the Australian Army in 1942, and although not posted overseas, played little sport until the conclusion of the war. On his return to competitive cricket, Puckett became one of Western Australia's leading bowlers. In the state's inaugural season in the first-class Sheffield Shield, he took 35 wickets, which remains a state record. Puckett played his last match for the state in 1953, at the age of 42, finishing his career with 158 wickets from 37 matches. Having returned to South Australia later in life, Puckett died in Adelaide in 2002, and was posthumously named an inaugural inductee in the Baseball Australia Hall of Fame in 2005. His son, Max Puckett, also played representative baseball and cricket for South Australia.

== Early life and baseball career ==
Puckett was born in Beddington Corner on 21 February 1911, at the time part of the Croydon Rural District in Surrey. His father had occasionally served as a groundsman at The Oval. Having emigrated to Adelaide, South Australia, with his family, he began playing A-grade baseball in the 1931 season of the South Australian Baseball League, playing alongside his three brothers at the newly formed Prospect Baseball Club. After a poor start, Puckett improved to batting just below .300 by the season's end. He often formed a successful battery with his older brother, Tom, with the brothers alternating between the roles of pitcher and catcher. After good form pitching in the 1933 season, including a shutout against Sturt, Puckett was selected as one of two pitchers for the South Australian state team at the interstate carnival held in August 1933 between representative teams from New South Wales, South Australia, and Victoria. He played in both of the games against Victoria, recording a total of three hits, all singles. The same month, Puckett was involved in another shutout, in Prospect's defeat of the previous season's minor premiers, Goodwood.

Considered one of the finest players in the state league, Puckett was again named in the South Australian team for the 1934 interstate tournament—the inaugural edition of the Claxton Shield. In the tournament, he partnered with Ron Sharpe, with their partnership playing a key role in the state's three wins from four games. Puckett finished the 1934 season fourth in the league batting averages, at .357 from 70 at bats. Having again represented South Australia at the 1935 and 1936 Claxton Shields, Puckett was awarded the inaugural Capps Medal at the end of the 1936 season, as the best player in the league. Prior to the start of the 1937 season, Puckett transferred to Melbourne to play for the Essendon Baseball Club in the Victorian Baseball Association. Now playing almost exclusively as a pitcher, he did not debut until several weeks into the season as a result of residency requirements. In his first match, against the Melbourne Baseball Club, he only had one hit recorded against him, with The Daily News reporting that he was "the fastest pitcher seen in Victoria for years". In one early-season match against Fitzroy, he hit a grand slam, allowing Essendon to win the game 4–1. At the season's end, Puckett was awarded the Lansdown Medal as the association's best player, having also represented Victoria at the Claxton Shield. However, Puckett left Victoria at the end of the year for Perth, Western Australia, where he had accepted a position working for the publishing house of The West Australian. The Adelaide-based Mail noted "the departure of Puckett will rob Victoria of one of the finest baseballers it has ever had".

His type of pitching is rarely seen in Australia. He maintains great speed throughout a game of any length—this alone is an achievement, and his curves are definite breaks, not just round house deliveries. Some of his faster deliveries really jump as they reach the batter. This type of ball can get its hop only from exceptional speed. With a fast delivery he can swerve either way, or make the ball dip suddenly. His control is exceptionally good, and his catcher knows that whenever he signals knee-high, shoulder-high, inside or outside, curve or speed ball—Puckett will deliver it unerringly. Therein lies his unusual quality as a pitcher.

— Albany Advertiser, 6 December 1937

After arriving in Perth, Puckett took up playing baseball for the West Australian Press Club (generally known as simply "Press"), effectively a sporting branch of his employer. The Sunday Times noted prior to the beginning of the season that Press would "have as their pitcher Charlie Puckett, the outstanding baseballer in Australia". Puckett was selected to pitch for Western Australia at the 1938 Claxton Shield held in Perth, which marked the first occasion that the state would participate in the tournament. Although Western Australia was unsuccessful, he was awarded the Tom Smith Memorial Trophy as the best all-round player at the tournament, the third successive year he had won such an award in interstate competition. Continuing his form in the 1939 season, Puckett pitched a perfect game against Victoria Park, in one instance needing only ten pitched balls to strike out three batters. He once again was selected for the state team at the 1939 Claxton Shield, and at the tournament's end was selected as part of the reserve battery in an "All-Australian" team—the team was merely symbolic, and did not actually play any games. In the carnival, Puckett played a match against his younger brother, Jim, who was still based in South Australia. Local baseball competition was more subdued over the following years, owing to the war, and interstate competition was suspended until 1946. Puckett did not play at interstate level again, although he did play several games for a combined "WA Army" side against a United States Army side in 1942.

== Cricket career and later life ==
Puckett had played cricket in Adelaide for almost as long as he played baseball, beginning with the Prospect North Methodist club in the United Church association. He later progressed to the Goodwood Baseballers in the Adelaide and Suburban Cricket Association, which consisted of a group of baseball players attempting to keep fit over the summer months. The staggered nature of the two sports' seasons (baseball during the winter months and cricket during summer months) allowed Puckett to continue to play both sports well into his 40s. After moving to Perth, he took up playing for the West Australian Newspapers side in the Mercantile Cricket Association, gaining a reputation as a fast opening bowler—indeed, in his first four matches for the team, he had averaged at least ten wickets in every game. Puckett finished the season with 66 wickets at an average of 6.56, easily topping the league's bowling averages, and helping his team win its first premiership. The Western Mail remarked "Puckett keeps an excellent length and swings the ball ably", and The Sunday Times said that Puckett had "showed again that he is out of his class in matting cricket".

Residing in the West Perth Cricket Club's zone, Puckett made his First Grade debut for the side in the WACA District competition in October 1939, against East Perth, and took two wickets. Continued good form, including a haul of 7/27 against Claremont, led to Puckett's selection to play for Western Australia in a first-class match against the touring South Australia in February 1940, held at the WACA Ground. Replacing the unavailable Ron Halcombe, also a fast bowler, he took the wickets of two tail-enders in South Australia's only innings, with the match ending in a draw after three days. Puckett ended his season at the top of the competition's bowling aggregates, finishing with 82 wickets at an average of 10.65. He remaining in similar form over the following seasons, with his 1940–41 season including hauls of 5/29 against Claremont, 7/34 against Fremantle, 8/61 against North Perth, and 6/56 against the RAAF, as well as 7/21 against North Perth in the competition's final. In February 1944, he recorded figures of 9/49 against the RAAF, a First Grade record.

Interstate competition was suspended in the early 1940s due to the war, and like many other players, Puckett joined the Australian Defence Force, enlisting in the Australian Army in September 1942. He spent the war as a physical training and unarmed combat instructor, and was thus able to remain in Australia. Continuing to play grade cricket for West Perth, Puckett was regarded as one of the finest bowlers in the state during the war, and led the First Grade bowling aggregates over the 1939–40 (82 wickets at 10.65), 1940–41 (73 wickets at 11.57), 1943–44 (99 wickets at 8.25), and 1944–45 seasons (73 wickets at 12.41)—the latter two seasons had been restricted to one-day games due to the limited availabilities of players.

Puckett died in Adelaide in January 2002, aged 90, with Max having predeceased him by eleven years. In 2005, he was an inaugural inductee into the Baseball Australia Hall of Fame.

== See also ==
- List of first-class cricketers for Western Australia
