= Baseball in Australia =

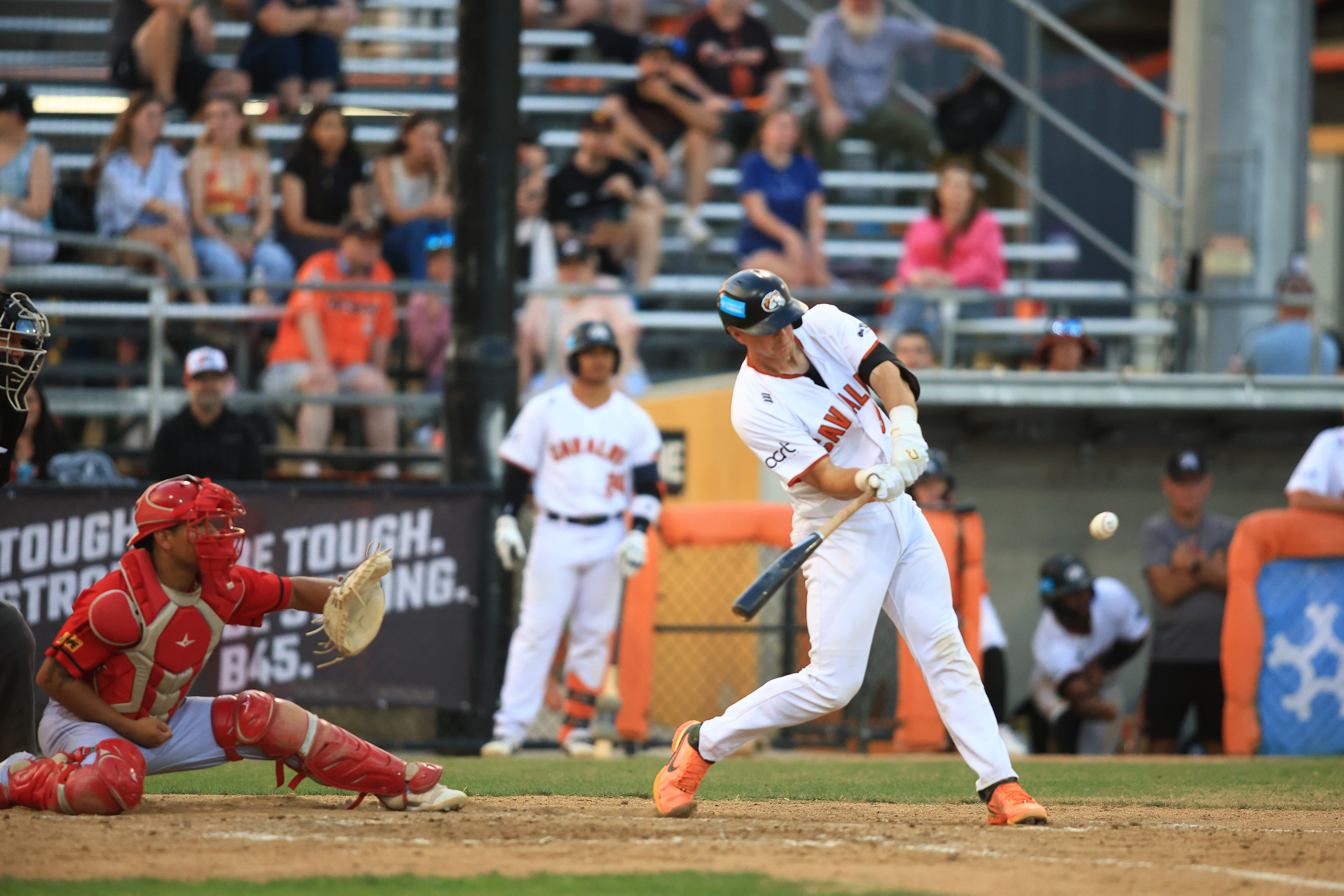
- A 2025 game in the Australian Baseball League
- Country: Australia
- Governing body: Australian Baseball Federation
- National team: Australia
- Nickname: Southern Thunder (Men); Emeralds (Women)

National competitions
- Claxton Shield

Club competitions
- Australian Baseball League

International competitions
- Oceania Baseball Championship; World Baseball Classic; Women's Baseball World Cup

Audience records
- Single match: 104,400, 1 December 1956, Melbourne Cricket Ground

In Australia, baseball is a game that is played in all states and territories of the country.

== History ==
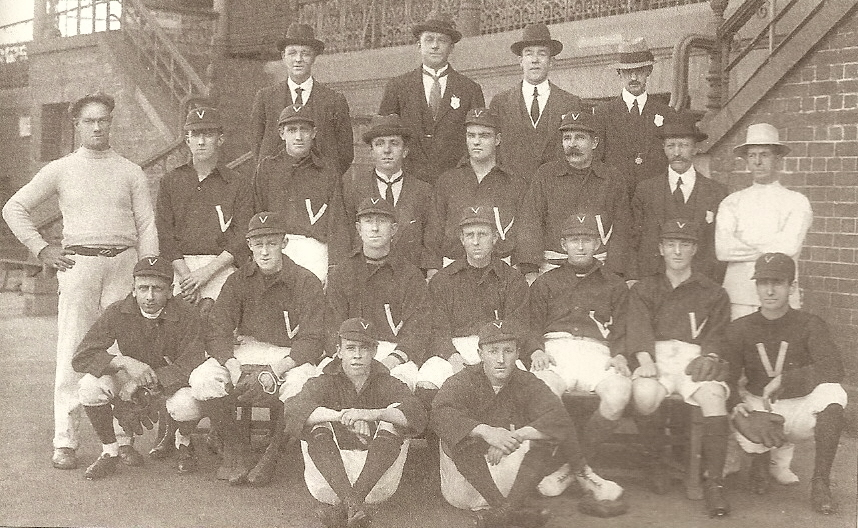
The Victoria baseball team at the Melbourne Cricket Ground in 1919.

Baseball was believed to have been brought to Australia with American gold miners in the Victorian gold rush of the 1850s, where miners would play baseball on the gold fields on their rest days. The first reports of organised teams and results appeared in Ballarat, Victoria in 1857.

In 1867, Victorian cricketers William Gaggin and Louis Goldsmith tried to set up a game of baseball at Yarra Park but were disrupted by fans arriving for a local Australian football match. The first competitive series was played between the Surry Baseball Club and members of the New South Wales Cricket Association over June/July 1878. However, it is argued competitive organised one-off matches from as early as 1875 were played before this time.

In December 1888, American entrepreneur Albert Spalding brought his Chicago White Stockings and a team of U.S. all-stars to Australia, as part of a world tour. Sydney Cricket Ground hosted three games. After the tour left Australia, Spalding's aide Harry Simpson helped organize baseball leagues in Victoria (1890) and New South Wales (1891); he was inducted into the Baseball Australia Hall of Fame in its inaugural class of 2005.

The first interstate baseball games were played in 1890 when Victoria played South Australia at the East Melbourne Cricket Ground. The visitors won the best of three series 16–14, 27–18 and 22–26 in Melbourne. These two states in 1897 formed the first Australia representative baseball team which toured the United States on what became known as the Kangaroo Tour.

The Australian team sponsored by Mr A.J. Roberts with £1,500 was selected to tour the United States. They were outclassed by the home teams, winning only eight of their first 26 games. The Americans were surprised to note the Australian outfielders did not wear gloves. Many of the tourists relied on friends and relatives to get them home as the organisers ran out of credit to send them back home.

Those players on the team who could afford it continued on to tour England. Games were billed as Australia vs England and were played at the Crystal Palace Sports Ground, although the tour turned sour when the team manager left London with the gate receipts, leaving many more players in financial limbo. This set the game back several years in Victoria and South Australia; however, it continued to flourish in New South Wales where the sport was established as a winter sport through the New South Wales Winter League in 1898.

The first Australian championships were in 1910 in Hobart, Tasmania between New South Wales, Victoria and Tasmania and won by NSW. This was followed by a similar series in Melbourne, Victoria between Victoria, NSW, South Australia and Tasmania in August 1910. NSW also won this series.

At the end of the 19th century, Americans also tried to set up baseball leagues and competitions in Australia, with some success. A national league was initiated in 1934, and the national team entered World Championship competition in the late 1970s. Prior to winning the silver medal at the 2004 Olympic Games in Athens, Australia had finished 7th in the Olympics twice, which is also the highest position reached in World Championships.

In the late 1980s to late 1990s the national league took off, with most capital cities having a team. The games were broadcast weekly on ABC television around the country. In the 12 months to March 1995 baseball hit its peak attendance rates with 133,000 people, equivalent to 0.9% of Australians over 15, having attended a baseball game that year. This was just under the attendance of golf and above outdoor hockey and lawn bowls.

A national-level competition still exists, as well as lower-level club competitions, but the game attracts comparatively little or no spectator or media interest. Several Australians, however, have attracted the attention of American scouts and have gone on to play in the major leagues in the United States and Japan.

Although baseball remains a fringe sport at adult level, it has experienced explosive growth at the youth level in the 21st century. The first Little League Baseball-affiliated league in the country was established in 2007. By mid-2012, the number of Little Leagues in the country had risen to about 400, making Australia the largest country in Little League participation outside of North America. This growth led the parent organisation to announce that Australia would receive an automatic berth in the Little League World Series starting in 2013.

== Baseball Associations and Leagues ==
Baseball Australia

- Australian Baseball League

Baseball Victoria

- Baseball Victoria Summer League
- Melbourne Winter Baseball League
- Geelong Baseball Association
- Ballarat Baseball Association
- Dandenong Baseball Association
- Latrobe Valley Baseball Association
- North Eastern Baseball Association
- Bendigo Baseball Association
- Sunraysia Baseball League

Baseball NSW

- New South Wales Major League
- Macarthur Baseball League
- Sydney Winter Baseball League
- NSW Women's League
- Country NSW League
- Central Coast Baseball Association
- Coffs Harbour Baseball
- Pacific Coast League
- Hastings Baseball Association
- Tamworth Baseball Association
- Shoalhaven Baseball Association
- Wagga Baseball Association
- Newcastle League
- Illawarra League
- Far North Coast League

Baseball Queensland

- Greater Brisbane League
- Gold Coast Baseball Association
- Baseball Association Townsville
- Cairns Baseball League
- Southern Queensland Winter Baseball League

Baseball SA

- South Australian Baseball League
- Super League Baseball Adelaide
- SA Winterball Association
- Port Pirie Night Baseball League
- Riverland Baseball League

Baseball Canberra

- Canberra Baseball League

Baseball NT

- Alice Springs Baseball Association
- Darwin Baseball League

Baseball TAS

- Hobart Summer Baseball League
- Launceston Baseball League

Baseball WA

- State League

== Summer vs Winter ==
Baseball is considered traditionally a summer sport, meaning such that it will start in spring and end in autumn, however, this has changed many times in Australia for different reasons. One of these reasons is because baseball in Australia was originally considered a sport for cricketers in the off-season, but as baseball became more popular as a standalone sport it was played more often in summer. The Claxton Shield was traditionally played in the Australian winter so Sheffield Shield players could participate.

However, the Australian Baseball League, International Baseball League of Australia and Claxton Shield in recent years have been played in the Australian summer, this is due to the MLB and other Northern Hemisphere baseball leagues being played in the northern summer, therefore many high-profile players from Australia were unable to play in the southern winter.

Both summer and winter baseball was played in Melbourne in the 1920s and Sydney from 1913 until the end of World War II, when baseball across Australia became mainly winter only. The exception to this was summer night baseball at Norwood Oval in Adelaide, South Australia in the 1950s and at Oriole Stadium in Sydney from 1969. During the late 1960s the trend swung back towards baseball's traditional season of summer.

When the New South Wales Major League decided to play summer only day baseball in 1973, a breakaway Sydney Winter League formed to continue playing in winter, while most NSW country centres continued in the winter. The Victorian Baseball Association in Melbourne switched to summer only in mid-1970. Since 1974 Sydney Baseball is now indeed an all year round sport.

== Notable players ==
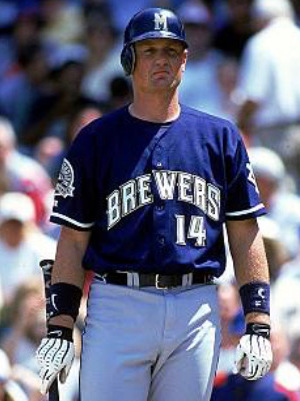
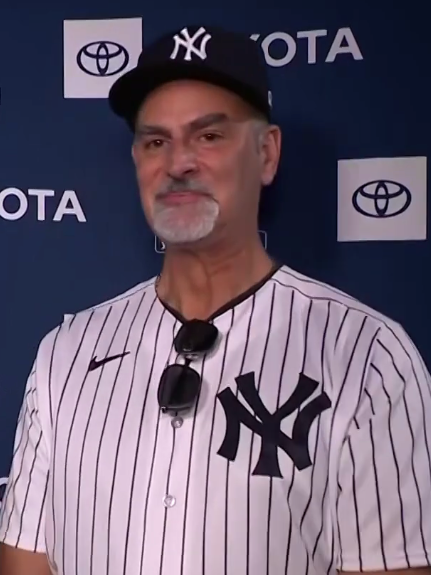
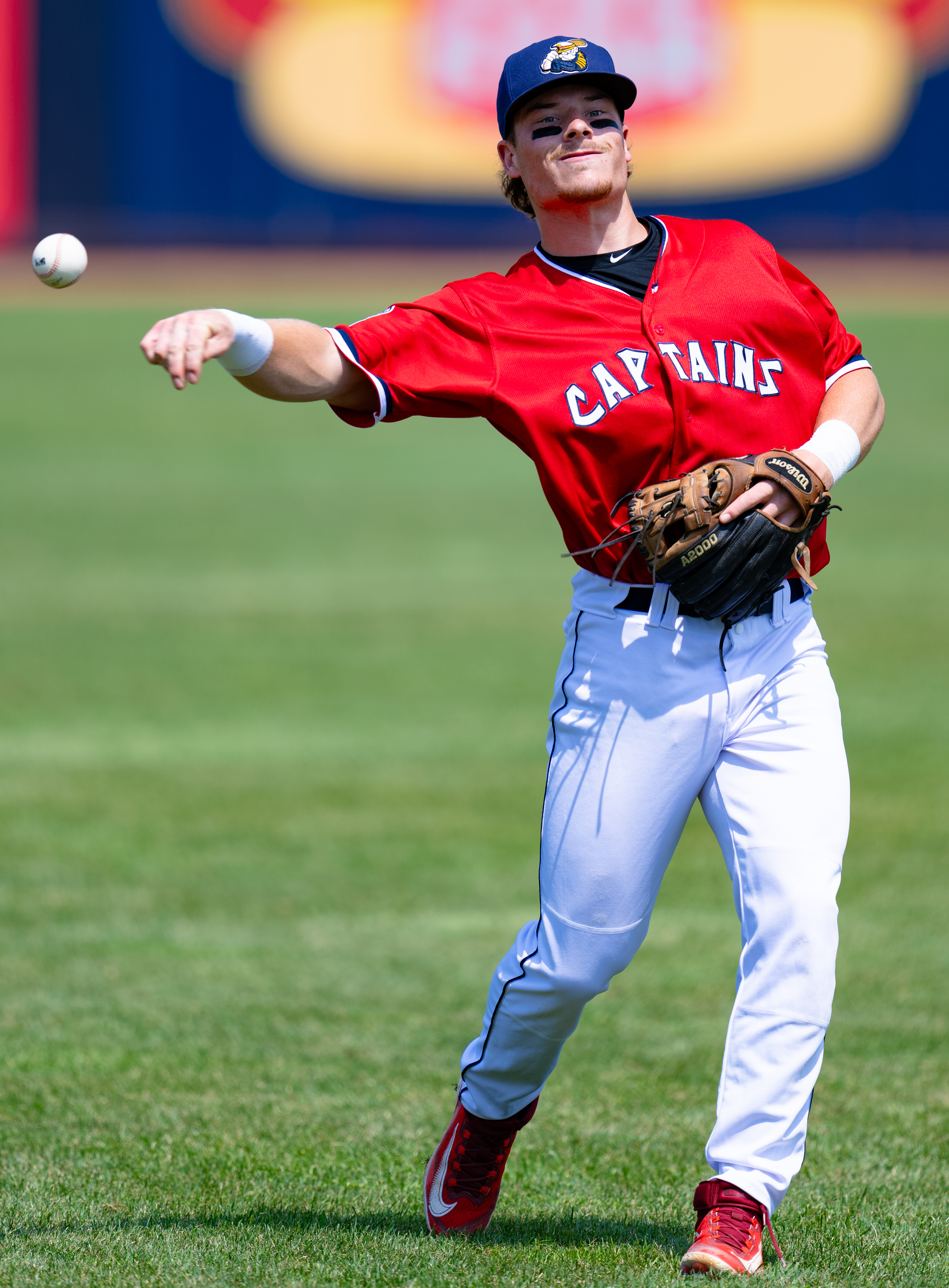
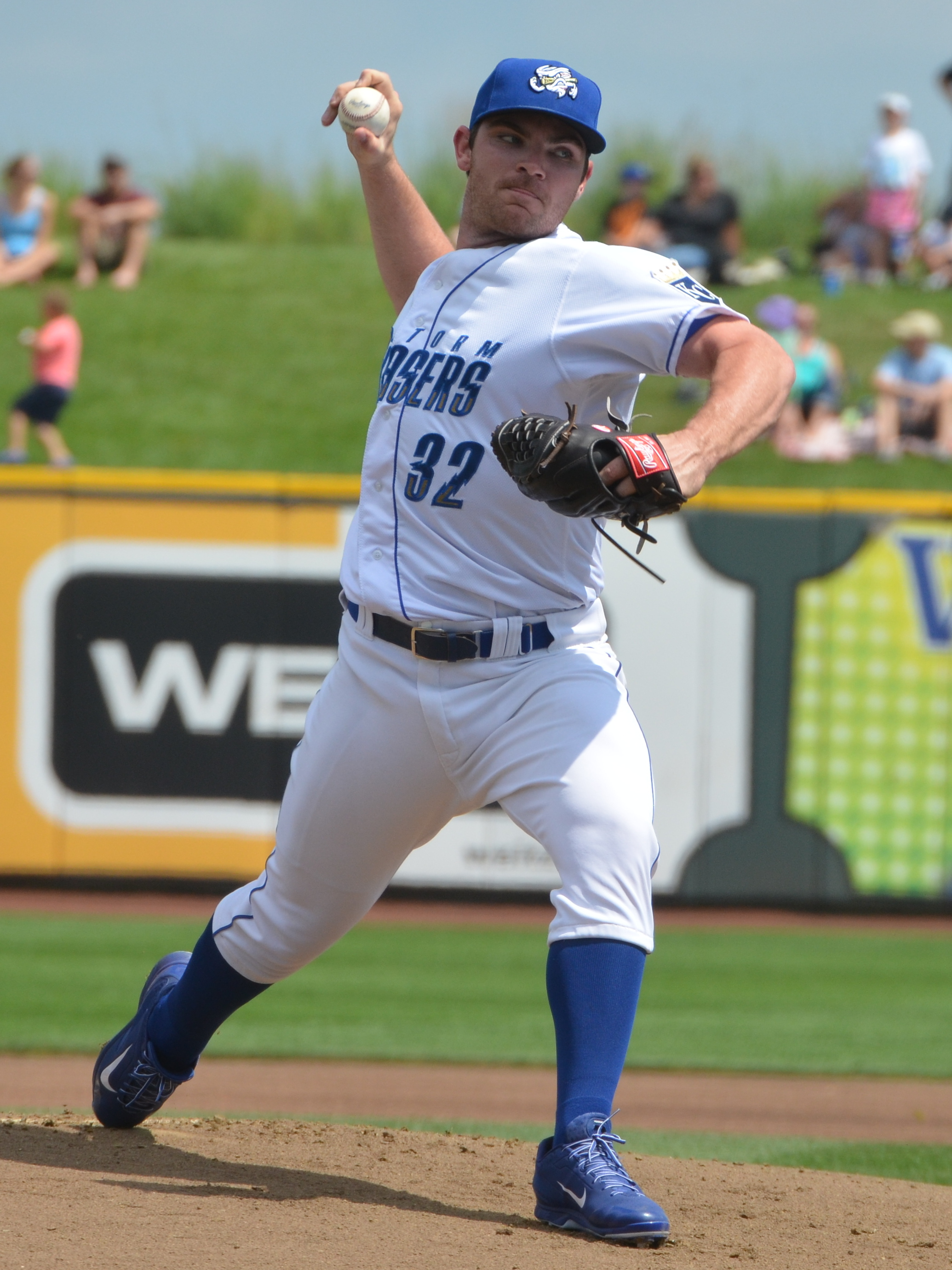
Clockwise from upper left: Dave Nilsson, Graeme Lloyd, Liam Hendriks and Travis Bazzana

There are many Australians playing baseball professionally in the United States, Japan, Korea, and various other countries.

In 1986, Craig Shipley became the first Australian in the modern era to play in Major League Baseball. Graeme Lloyd was the first Australian World Series champion, winning with both the 1996 and 1998 New York Yankees. In 1999, Dave Nilsson became the first Australian to be named a Major League All-Star. Liam Hendriks of Perth was a three-time All-Star in Major League Baseball and one of the best closers in the sport. Travis Bazzana of Turramurra High School in South Turramurra was the first overall pick in the 2024 MLB draft.

Domestically, Tim Kennelly of the Perth Heat is one of the most accomplished players in national history. By January 2024, he held the Australian Baseball League records for home runs, hits, runs batted in and games played.

== Secondary school level ==
=== Australian Schools Championships ===
The Australian Schools Championships for baseball, also informally named at all levels 'schoolboys', is an annual secondary school tournament that has been officially running since 1989. It includes an Open and U-15 tournament. Currently New South Wales, Victoria, South Australia, Queensland, Western Australia and the ACT compete in the Championship.

Teams are picked by their state's school sport association from their respective schoolboys state titles. It also provides an opportunity for the Australia national schoolboy baseball team to be picked.

Champions

- 1989 – Victoria
- 1990 – Victoria
- 1991 – New South Wales
- 1992 – New South Wales
- 1993 – New South Wales
- 1994 – Queensland
- 1995 – Victoria
- 1996 – Victoria
- 1997 – New South Wales
- 1998 – New South Wales
- 1999 – New South Wales
- 2000 – New South Wales
- 2001 – New South Wales
- 2002 – Victoria
- 2003 – New South Wales
- 2004 – Western Australia
- 2005 – Victoria
- 2006 – New South Wales
- 2007 – Queensland
- 2008 – Western Australia
- 2009 – Victoria
- 2010 – New South Wales
- 2011 – New South Wales
- 2012 – Victoria
- 2013 – New South Wales
- 2014 – New South Wales
- 2015 – New South Wales
- 2016 – Western Australia
- 2017 – New South Wales
- 2018 – New South Wales
- 2019 – New South Wales

Past Competitions

- Geelong 2007 – From 6 to 12 May 2007 the Championship was held in Geelong, Victoria at the Geelong Baseball Park.

The eventual tournament winner was Queensland, defeating New South Wales 3–1 in the final.

- Lismore 2008 – The 2008 tournament was held in Lismore, New South Wales at Albert Park from 4 to 10 May 2008.

Western Australia won the event defeating New South Wales 5–0 in the final.

- Canberra 2009 – In 2009, the tournament was held in Canberra, Australian Capital Territory from 4–9 May. In one of the most tightly contested championships of recent years, the Victorian side came out on top, defeating NSW 5–3 in the final on Saturday. Leading 3-0 early in the final, NSW fell victim to Victorian reliever Thomas Shaw who shut out his opponents the rest of the game – giving his team a chance of a thrilling comeback that they provided in turn. For NSW the honours were shared, but some brilliant work in the field from shortstop Jacob Younis kept his side close enough to bring the tying run to the plate in the last inning. That was as close as the team got, as it took Victorian closer Andrew Jones just the one pitch to finish the game and bring the title back to Victoria – their first since 2005 and 7th in the history of the tournament. In addition to team heroics, the tournament also played host to a raft of standout individual performances – culminating in the naming of the 2009 Australian Schools Team that will tour North America later this year under the guidance of Head Coach Stuart Hanrahan, assistants Chris Norrie and Brendon Wallace and tour Manager Neil Barrowcliff.
- Perth 2010 – The 2010 tournament was played a week later than usual and at Perth, meaning many states sent a weakened squad due to the geographic location of Perth in relation to the rest of Australia and that Major League Baseball Australian Academy Program was due to start earlier in the year. New South Wales sent a roster far stronger than any of the other states and dominated the tournament, winning all eight matches and scoring an average of 12 runs per game. They defeated Australian Capital Territory in the final 10–5. Individual standouts were Luke Parish from New South Wales, who batted .524 and Colin Tilini (1-0) also from NSW who pitched 8.1 scoreless innings in two appearances, striking out 11.

== See also ==
- List of baseball teams in Australia
- Australian Baseball Federation
- Baseball Australia Hall of Fame
- Baseball at the Australian University Games
- Baseball awards#Australia
- Tee-ball

== Bibliography ==
- Harris, John O. (2009). Queensland Baseball 1905–1990.
