= Fitzroy Baseball Club =

- Logo

Information
- League: Baseball Victoria Summer League
- Location: Fitzroy, Victoria
- Ballpark: Merri Park
- Founded: 1889
- League championships: Division 1 – 1914, 1917, 1918, 1921, 1922, 1923, 1924, 1925, 1927, 1929, 1936, 1937, 1950, 1951, 1952, 1954 Division 2 – 1906, 1934, 1941, 1945, 1973, 1976/77, 1986/87, 2004/05, 2009/10
- Former name: Fitzroy Maroons
- Former ballpark: Brunswick St Oval
- Colors: Maroon and Navy Blue

Current uniforms
Home	Away

The Fitzroy Baseball Club, known as the Fitzroy Lions, is a baseball club founded in 1889 to represent the inner Melbourne suburb of Fitzroy, Victoria. The club was a founding member of the Victorian Baseball League, Victoria's first organised baseball competition. Fitzroy has won 16 Division 1 championships and currently has seven senior men's teams, one women's team and a masters team competing in the Baseball Victoria Summer League, as well as junior sides representing the club at every age level.

== Early history ==
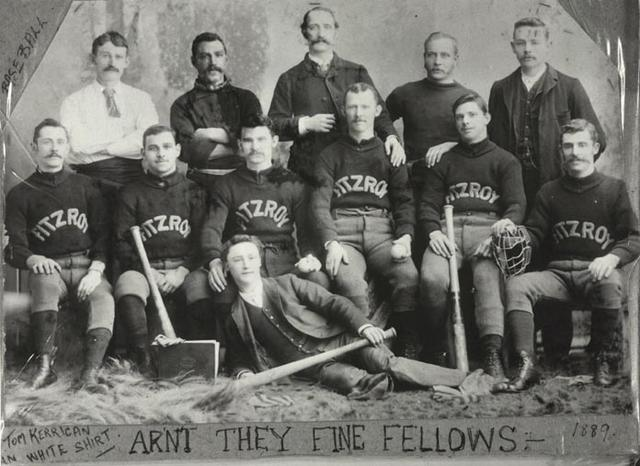
1889 Fitzroy Lions, back row T Kerrigan, T Lederman, R Simmons, W Park, A Fletcher centre row J McCurdy, G Lederman, R Mitchell, A Mc Neill, G Beecham, J Cantwell front row P Fairway

The Fitzroy Baseball Club was founded by the Fitzroy Cricket Club in 1889, the cricket club also founded the Fitzroy Football Club, Tennis Club and Bowls Club. The first intimation to form a baseball club was received by the committee from Mr E. Glass on 20 May 1889, and it was resolved at the next committee meeting to form a team in connection with the club.

Fitzroy was a foundation member of the Victorian Baseball League which was formed under the guidance of Harry Simpson in March 1889. The other foundation teams were; Victoria, MCC, Fitzroy, Richmond, Richmond Cricket Club, Ferguson, Mitchell, The Age, St Kilda, Malvern, Carlton, South Melbourne, East Melbourne, Metropolitans, Essendon and Blackburn.

Several notable cricketers played for Fitzroy early in the club's history including cricketer Bill Ponsford who played for Fitzroy from 1913 to 1934 and the Harvey brothers (Neil Harvey, Merv Harvey, Mick Harvey, Ray Harvey, Harold Harvey and Brian Harvey) who played from the 1930s to the 1960s.

== Recent history ==
=== 2009/10: Division 2 club champions ===
Fitzroy Baseball Club had a season winning the Baseball Victoria's Division 2 Club Championship Award and gaining promotion to division 1. The club championship reflected the club's depth throughout all grades, after the home and away season the 1sts finished second, the 2nds finished, the 3rds went undefeated throughout the season, the 4ths finished second and the 5ths finished fifth; resulting in three premierships. The award was a fitting tribute to the 120 year anniversary of the club.

=== 2015/16: Division 2 runners up and promotion to division 1 ===
Fitzroy were runners up in the division 2 grand final to Moorabbin Baseball Club earning promotion to division 1 for the 2016/17 season. Taylor Eichhorst won the Division 2 home run championship and John Peterson was honoured as the Baseball Victoria Coach of the Year for his work coaching the lions back into division 1.

=== 2016/17: Division 1 club champions ===
In the club's first year back in division 1 it won the club championship and made the first division 1 finals appearance for the firsts since 1961. Following the Christmas break Fitzroy's firsts strung together ten consecutive victories to surge into playoff contention, bowing out in the conference playoff against Essendon. Josh Tols starred on the mound with a 0.20 ERA winning the league's best pitcher award and new club coach Tom Dicker was a standout with the bat, finishing with a 0.421 batting average (the 3rd best in the league) and a 0.513 OBA. Four Fitzroy players were also recognised in the league allstar team Alex Turlea, Josh Tols, Tom Dicker and Zach Rhodes

In the 2016/2017 year the club's 1sts, 2nds, 4ths and 5ths all made it into the playoffs helping to secure the club championship. The 2nds won the grand final 6-4 against Waverley making it back to back premierships for the team.

== Notable players ==
=== Bill Ponsford ===
William Harold "Bill" Ponsford MBE (19 October 1900 – 6 April 1991) started his baseball career at Alfred Crescent School (now Fitzroy North Primary School), where his coach was the former Victorian player Charles Landsdown. As a junior Ponsford played shortstop, later as a senior for the Fitzroy Baseball Club he converted to catching. Ponsford was a key member of the all conquering 1920's Fitzroy Maroons, captaining the club to its historic 1925 premiership, the Club's fifth consecutive Division 1 premiership.

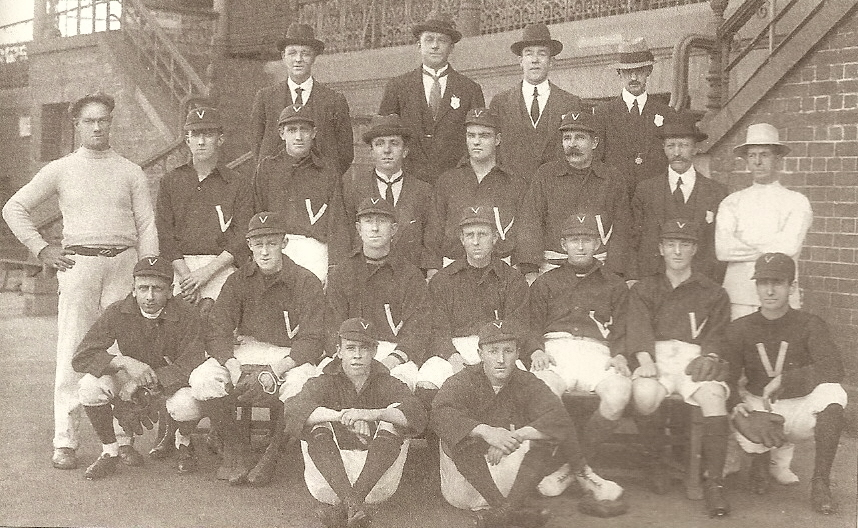
Ponsford (front row, left) wearing the Big V of the Victorian baseball team at the Melbourne Cricket Ground in 1919. His future Test cricket teammate, Jack Ryder is seated directly behind him.

Ponsford improved rapidly and by 1913 he was included in the Victorian schoolboys side for a tournament in Adelaide. He was again selected in the following year—now as a catcher—representing his state at the first national schoolboys championship in Sydney. The tournament coincided with a visit to Australia by two professional major league teams from the United States—the Chicago White Sox and the New York Giants. The manager of the Giants, John "Mugsy" McGraw, watched part of the tournament; the Ponsford family claim that McGraw was so impressed with Ponsford's skills that he later spoke to Ponsford's parents about the possibility of Bill playing in the United States.

In 1919, Ponsford was selected for Victoria's baseball team, alongside future Test cricket teammate Jack Ryder. In 1923, The Sporting Globe claimed that Ponsford was "... the best batter of the season. ... Indeed, as an all-round man, it is doubtful if he has a superior in the state." In 1925, Ponsford captained the Victorian team and was selected as centre fielder in an Australian representative team that played three matches against an outfit from the United States Pacific Fleet, which had docked in Melbourne. Over the three matches, won by the Australians, Ponsford had five safe hits and his batting average was .357. Ponsford's next match against American opposition was against a team from Stanford University that visited Australia in 1927. Ponsford's Victorian team defeated Stanford 5–3; it was the visitors' only loss on the tour.

Ponsford simultaneously retired from baseball and cricket in 1934. In his newspaper column, he said that he liked both sports equally. He felt that baseball gave a player more opportunities to perform: "In cricket you may have the bad luck to get out early; which often means a blank afternoon. It is not so with baseball; you are in the game all the time." Joe Clark, the author of History of Australian Baseball, said "Ponsford is considered by many to be the best baseballer of his time in Australia." The official program for the 1952 Claxton Shield—held in Perth—made a similar claim.

One name in Australian baseball stands pre-eminent above all others and that is the name of Bill Ponsford ... During his long career he was a star outfielder, perhaps the finest third baseman to represent his state and certainly as a catcher the equal of anybody. ... But it was as a batter that Bill outshone anyone ... Ponsford could, and did, hit to any part of a baseball field at will, and would nominate innings by innings, where he would hit the ball ... Ponsford will always remain amongst the greatest sportsmen of all time.

— 1952 Claxton Shield program,

=== Graeme Deany ===
Graeme started playing cricket at Fitzroy Cricket Club as a 13-year-old in 1949. At the cricket club Ray Harvey noticed his athletic ability, throwing and fielding and invited Graeme to join the Fitzroy Baseball Club where he started as a 16-year-old in the seconds in 1953 (there were no junior teams at the time). Graeme started playing baseball at left field and for 2 seasons at Fitzroy played alongside Neil Harvey at center field and his younger brother Ian Deany at right field. After those first two seasons he moved into the infield playing shortstop and 3rd base for the rest of his career at the top level of baseball.

Graeme played baseball for Fitzroy from 1953 to 1962 and then 1964 to 1965. After one season of baseball he was selected on the bench for the club's 1954 A-grade Grand final victory against St Kilda 6-4 at the Junction Oval. In 1963 he moved to Footscray as captain / coach and then returned to Fitzroy to captain / coach in 1964 and 1965. Finally in 1966 he moved to Ivanhoe and coached them to a C grade premiership.

Graeme was a member of the Victorian Claxton Shield Team for 11 consecutive years (from 1956 to 1966), winning the Claxton Shield 4 times playing at SS and 3rd Base and playing in 72 of 74 possible games. He was selected in the Australian team 9 times and 7 years in a row from 1957 to 1963, an Australian record at the time. He won the Helms award in 1965 for the best player of the Australian championships, the first Victorian to win the Helms award.

=== Australian Baseball Hall of Fame ===
- Graeme Deany – inducted 2005

=== Helms Award winners ===
The 'Helms' award is arguably Australian baseball's most prestigious individual award. Since 1962 the 'Helms' award has been awarded each year to the most outstanding player of the Claxton Shield competition (Australian baseball's annual national tournament). The following Fitzroy Baseball club players have won the award:

- Graeme Deany – 1965

=== Baseball Victoria life members ===
- John King – inducted 2015

== International / national representatives ==
=== Australian team ===
- Bill Ponsford – 1920's
- Neil Harvey – 1946
- Ray Harvey – 1948
- Graeme Deany – 1957, 1958, 1959, 1960, 1961, 1962, 1963, 1965, 1966
- Josh Tols – 2017 World Baseball Classic
- Allie Bebbere – 2023 World Cup

=== Victorian team ===
- Bill Ponsford – 1919, 1920 1922, 1927
- H Lansdown – 1922, 1927
- A Dummett – 1927
- Alan Logan – 1930s
- Tom Ruddell – 1934
- Ted Melling – 1934
- Howard Parkin – 1936 (captain)
- McCarthy – 1938
- J Plant – 1938, 1939 (captain coach)
- Merv Harvey – 1940s
- Neil Harvey – 1946, 1950, 1951
- Mick Harvey – 1940–50s
- Ray Harvey – 1947, 1948, 1949, 1950, 1951
- Brian Harvey – 1940–50s
- Don Arnall – 1952
- Keith Cant – 1950, 1951, 1952
- J. Knight – 1950, 1952
- A. McLean – 1951, 1952
- Neil Turl – 1956
- Glen Tippett – 1950, 1951, 1952, 1956
- Graeme Deany – 1956, 1957, 1958, 1959, 1960, 1961, 1962, 1963, 1964, 1965, 1966
- Allie Bebbere – 2019, 2022, 2023

=== Melbourne Aces ===
Fitzroy has had several clubmen represent the Melbourne Aces playing professional baseball in the Australian Baseball League, including:

- Jamie Lethborg – 2011/12
- John Edwards – 2011/12
- Adam Rowe – 2012/13
- Josh Tols – 2016-2019

== Legends and life members ==
=== Club legends ===
- Graham Moss
- John King
- Norm McHenry
- Jim Bolkas
- Graeme Deany
- Laurie Mazzocato
- Edward Sedgman
- Karen King
- Michael Chambers
- Tony Wyatt

=== Life members ===
- Graham Moss – 1980/81
- Rick Stevens – 1981/82
- Ross Stevens – 1981/82
- Laurie Mazzocato – 1986/87
- Paul Farris – 1990/91
- Frank Hanlon – 1990/91
- Don Hevey – 1990/91
- Greg Hooper – 1990/91
- Peter Hooper – 1990/91
- Joan Hooper – 1990/91
- Norm McHenry – 1990/91
- Michael Chambers – 1992/93
- Ed Evans – 1992/93
- Barbara Wood – 1992/93
- Chris Wilson – 1993/94
- Steve Brooke – 1993/94
- Ian Brown – 1993/94
- Marcia Brown – 1993/94
- Lloyd Ingram – 1993/94
- David Jones – 1993/94
- John King – 1993/94
- Karen King – 1993/94
- Wendy McHenry – 1994/95
- Joe Salanitri – 1995/96
- Colin Richardson – 1997/98
- Bruce Robinson – 1997/98
- Judy Wilson – 1997/98
- Tony Wyatt – 1997/98
- Storm Arnott – 2003/04
- Jim Beitzel – 2003/04
- Jim Bolkas – 2003/04
- Tony Bullen – 2003/04
- Gaele Kirk – 2006/07
- Ingar Kirkland – 2007/08
- Peter Wilson – 2008/09
- Karl Leake – 2011/12
- Geoff Freeth – 2014/15
- Gerard Joss – 2014/15
- Mark McCloskey – 2014/15
- Phyllis Hargreaves – 2016/17
- Marc Heenan - 2020/21
- Darren Hill - 2020/21
- D'Arcy Mills - 2021/22
- Tony King - 2022/23
- Carl Wilson - 2022/23

== Club honour roll ==
Fitzroy Baseball Club Honour Roll
	President	Secretary	Treasurer	Club coach	Best player
2022/23	John King	Mario Epifanio	Patrick Wyatt	Zach Breen	Tom Dicker
2021/22	John King	Ingar Kirkland	Chris Wilson	Danny King	Tom Wilson
2020/21	John King	Ingar Kirkland	Chris Wilson	Ryan Mitchell	Riley Hill
2019/20	John King	Leah Trebilcock	Chris Wilson	Ryan Mitchell	
2018/19	John King	Ingar Kirkland	Chris Wilson	Tom Dicker	Alex Merithew
2017/18	John King	Ingar Kirkland	Chris Wilson	Tom Dicker	Tom Dicker
2016/17	John King	Ingar Kirkland	Chris Wilson	Tom Dicker	Brock Pawley
2015/16	John King	Ingar Kirkland	Chris Wilson	John Peterson	Taylor Eichhorst
2014/15	John King	Ingar Kirkland	Chris Wilson	John Peterson	Callum Stevens
2013/14	John King	Ingar Kirkland	Chris Wilson	John Peterson	Derek Christensen
2012/13	John King	Ingar Kirkland	Chris Wilson	John Peterson	Adam Rowe
2011/12	John King	Ingar Kirkland	Chris Wilson	Matthew Kemp	
2010/11	John King	Ingar Kirkland	Ben Lethborg	John Edwards	
2009/10	John King	Ingar Kirkland	Karen King	John Edwards	John Edwards
2008/09	John King	Ingar Kirkland	Karen King	John King	
2007/08	John King	Ingar Kirkland	Karen King	John King	Brock Pawley
2006/07	John King	Ingar Kirkland	Karen King	Andrew McKenzie	Joel Arnott
2005/06	John King	Ingar Kirkland	Karen King	Stephen Black	Jason Blejwas
2004/05	John King	Ingar Kirkland	Karen King	Stephen Black	
2003/04	John King	Ingar Kirkland	Karen King	Stephen Black	
2002/03	John King	Ingar Kirkland	Karen King	Stephen Black	

== Home ground at Merri Park ==
In 1883, Charles McCarthy, an Irish-born doctor, opened a Melbourne Retreat for the Cure of Inebriates on 32 acres on St. Georges Rd that is now largely occupied by Northcote High School and Merri Park.

In the early 1900s the growing Fitzroy Cricket Club (the original parent club of the Fitzroy Baseball Club) was in need of an additional field for its teams to play on. To develop a solution the club arranged a meeting on 17 August 1909 between the Mayor of Northcote, the Mayor of Fitzroy, Councillors from both cities, the committee of the Fitzroy Cricket Club and the Minister for Lands Mr McKenzie. The Cricket Club urged that the 10 acres of the Crown land known as the Inebriates' Retreat, at Northcote, be sold to the Club for recreation purposes at a nominal price. The Minister promised to take the matter to the Cabinet and the outcome was the following letter :

Department of Lands and Survey.

Melbourne, 21st October, 1909.

Referring to the deputation which waited on the Honorable the Minister of Lands on the 17th August last, in regard to the purchase by your Club of portion of the site known as the "Inebriates' Retreat", Northcote, I have the honor, by direction, to inform you that the Cabinet has decided to allow, the Northcote Town Council permissive occupancy, for recreation purposes, of the area (a out 9 acres) indicated by blue on the annexed tracing, for a term of five (5) years, on condition that the Council arrange with the Fitzroy Cricket Club for the use of about 5 acres of such area, and on the understanding that, improvements be effected thereon to the value of at least £1,000 during the said term of five (5) years, the area of 9 acres will be permanently reserved for recreation purposes.

I have the honor to be, Sir, Your obedient servant,

JNO. MACGIBBON,

Hon. Secretary, Pro Secretary for Lands.

The ground was used by the Club as an adjunct ground from 1910 with the club undertaking a number of improvements together with the Northcote Council. In 1912 with the help of the Fitzroy Council the cricket club filled in the unused watercourse that crossed the park with 4,000 square yards of filling.

In 1914 considerable improvements were made by the Cricket Club with the pavilion re-erected and caretakers quarters added as well as a 4 ft 3in picket fence being erected along the length of the western and southern boundaries of the field to prevent cricket balls going into the Merri Creek so often. The improvements made by the club up to 1914 totalled £750, including the filling of the storm water channel.

In 1915 the club continued to make improvements in order to fulfil the terms of the land grant, the pavilion was re-painted, the water supply was laid to the park and the showers connected proving a great convenience to players.

In 1927 Merri Park was made into a permanent reserve after the Minister of Lands allowed the Education Department to use part of the reserve for Northcote High School.

During the 2011–12 summer season Merri Park was resurfaced and underwent a warm weather turf conversion to protect it from the drought conditions which had seen it become a dust bowl in previous years. Fitzroy relocated for the majority of the season to Elder St Reserve, Greensborough Baseball Club's winter ground.

== Club song ==
To the tune of "La Marseillaise"

We are the boys from old Fitzroy,
We wear the colours maroon and blue,
We will always strive for victory,
We will always see it through.
Win or lose we do or die,
And in defeat we always try,
Fitzroy Fitzroy the team we love so dear,
Premiers we'll be this year.

== See also ==
- Baseball Victoria
- Baseball Victoria Summer League
