= Steven Kent (baseball) =

Australian baseball player

Canberra Cavalry – No. 23
- Pitcher
- Born: 8 May 1989 (age 36); Canberra, Australia
- Bats: Left Throws: Left
- Stats at Baseball Reference

Steven John Kent (born 8 May 1989) is an Australian professional baseball pitcher for the Canberra Cavalry of the Australian Baseball League.

Kent is a four time ABL All-Star.

== Career ==
=== Atlanta Braves ===
Kent signed with the Atlanta Braves as an international free agent in 2005 for a $370,000 signing bonus. In 2007 the Australian Baseball Federation named him the youth player of the year. He started his professional career in 2006 playing for the GCL Braves of the rookie-level Gulf Coast League. After a successful return from Tommy John surgery during the 2015–16 ABL season Kent trialed with the Kansas City Royals. In January 2016 it was announced that Kent has signed with his former club the Atlanta Braves. Kent spent the majority of the 2016 season playing with Atlanta's AA side the Mississippi Braves. In September 2016 Kent was promoted to Atlanta's AAA side the Gwinnett Braves.

=== Canberra Cavalry ===
Kent has played for the Canberra Cavalry in the Australian Baseball League since their opening season in 2010. Before the 2013–14 ABL season he hurt his ulnar collateral ligament in a Baseball ACT game, and had a Tommy John surgery on 2 December 2015, sidelining him for the entire 2013–14, and most of the 2014–15 ABL season.

On 14 November 2015 he threw a 7-inning complete game shutout against the Brisbane Bandits. On 21 November he threw 8 2/3 shutout innings against the Melbourne Aces, but gave up a 2-run home run against Brad Harman. He was named as the Pitcher of the Week of 12–15 November and 19–22 November.

On 15 March 2018, against the Belconnen Bandits, he set a new Baseball Canberra single-game strikeout record, striking out 23 hitters in a complete-game shutout. Kent finished the 2018–19 ABL season with a team record and league-leading 7 wins and was named as the best Cavalry player of the season.

On 12 February 2019 he was invited for spring training of Yokohama DeNA BayStars of Nippon Professional Baseball (NPB) with Steven Chambers.

== Australian national team ==
Kent has been a member of Team Australia since he was 17. Kent competed in the 2008 Summer Olympics Qualification, 2011 Baseball World Cup, 2013, 2017 World Baseball Classic 2018 exhibition games against Japan and 2019 WBSC Premier12.

On 20 February 2018, he was selected exhibition games against Japan.

On 8 October 2019, he was selected at the 2019 WBSC Premier12.

On 10 February 2023, he selected at the 2023 World Baseball Classic.
