= Ron Sharpe (baseball) =

Australian baseball player

Ronald Maxy Sharpe (11 March 1905 – 24 October 1972 in Adelaide, South Australia) is regarded as South Australia's and Australia's finest ever baseball player.

Sharpe began his representative baseball career when he played his first interstate game for South Australia as a pitcher in 1921 at the age of 16. He then went on to represent South Australia for more than 18 years, becoming vice-captain and selector in 1928 and again in 1930 before taking over the captaincy from 1932. Sharpe was one of the first players in the Claxton Shield, helping South Australia to victory in the inaugural 1934 Claxton Shield as well as 1935 where he pitched 15 innings in the final against New South Wales and the 1936 Claxton Shield. He retired in 1946, missing only 1926 and 1939 through illness and the war years. His most notable performance was striking out 19 batters while conceding only three hits and four walks against New South Wales in 1931.

He played, pitched and coached the Goodwood Baseball Club in the South Australian Baseball League competition from 1922 to 1946, during which time the club won 16 premierships and was runner up four times. He won a number of league and club best-player awards in his time. His deeds also caused the Helms Foundation to present to the Australian Baseball Council (now Federation) a perpetual trophy to be awarded to the most valuable player in the Claxton Shield series each year. It is called the Ron Sharpe Trophy and was presented in his honour.

Sharpe was also an Australian representative on two occasions when an Australian representative team played a visiting American fleet in 1925 and Stanford University in 1928. Ron also represented South Australia in the Sheffield Shield cricket competition.

He was a baseball reporter for the 'Adelaide News' from 1923 to 1953. After his long and successful career as a player and coach, Sharpe became a dedicated administrator at club, league and Australian level. He was made a life member of the South Australian Baseball League in 1949. Sharpe was always a gentleman on and off the sporting field and was greatly admired.

Sharpe was inducted in the Sport Australia Hall of Fame in 1986 an inaugural inductee into the Baseball Australia Hall of Fame in 2005 and the National Sports Museum in 2008. He is also part of the Australia 75th Diamond Anniversary All-Star team as a pitcher.

Elder brother Cy (Cyril John Crutchfield Sharpe) entered the film industry. After Hollywood experience, he and Jack Bruce established Commonwealth Film Laboratories in Sydney c.1926, a firm which eventually became Colorfilm. There was an associated film studio located in the Sydney Showground. Most of Cy's life was spent in California.
