= St Kilda Baseball Club =

St Kilda Saints

Information
- League: Baseball Victoria Summer League - Summer Melbourne Winter Baseball League - Winter (Division 3, 3 Reserves, Division 4 - Summer, B grade, B Reserves, C reserves - Winter)
- Location: Albert Park, Victoria
- Ballpark: Tom O’Halloran Field, Albert Park
- Founded: 1879
- Colors: Black, White, Red, Yellow

Current uniforms
Current	Alternative

The St Kilda Saints Baseball Club is a baseball club based in the inner Melbourne suburb of St Kilda. The club, formed in 1879, is the oldest baseball club in Australia and played a series of games against the touring Georgia Minstrels.

The Club currently fields senior teams in summer in the Baseball Victoria Summer League in Division 3 and 4. In winter, the club fields senior teams in the Melbourne Winter Baseball League in B and C grades, and Junior Teams in the Little League Mariners Charter.

== History ==
The St Kilda Baseball Club was formed in 1879 to play against the traveling Hick Georgia Minstrels, However once the Minstrels left Melbourne, Victoria, the club went into recess. The Club reformed in 1889 with the establishment of the Victorian Baseball League.

The St Kilda Baseball Club was one of the 8 clubs that succeeded from the original Victorian Baseball League in 1915 to form the Victorian Baseball Union, the others being Melbourne, East Melbourne, South Melbourne, Fitzroy, Carlton, Richmond, Collingwood, and Hawthorn.
