= 1964 Claxton Shield =

25th annual Claxton Shield

- 1964

Tournament information
- Host(s): (Victoria (state)) Melbourne, VIC
- Teams: 5
- Defending champions: New South Wales

Final positions
- Champion: South Australia (8th title)
- Runner-up: Victoria

The 1964 Claxton Shield was the 25th annual Claxton Shield, it was held at the Albert Park in Melbourne, Victoria. The participants were South Australia, New South Wales, Victoria, Western Australia and Queensland. The series final was between South Australia and Victoria, with South Australia defeating the Victorians led by newcomer Ian Chappell who drove in seven runs in the final alone.

== Conditions ==
The 1964 series was played in poor conditions, with rain being a factor across most of the tournament. The ABC reported "after four days the grounds were quagmires and baseball has never been played under worse conditions". Queensland Baseball Association life member Stan Holloway also described one particular match as "a game of baseball played under the worst conditions I have ever seen" and recalled the mud being so thick that a hard line drive to third base was stopped dead on the full.

New South Wales shortstop Don Buchanan broke his leg in the conditions at second base in what was believed to be a career-ending injury. Buchanan received the Golden Glove for the series and returned to play for his state in the 1966 Claxton Shield.
