= Australian Schoolboys =

The Australian Schoolboys refer to junior teams that represent Australia in various sports. The name is mainly used in rugby league, rugby union and baseball. Other popular team sports in Australia such as cricket, basketball, soccer and Australian rules football generally use age-related team names, such as Under 18s, rather than the schoolboys title.

Baseball

- Australian Schoolboys national baseball team

Rugby league
Australia national schoolboy rugby league team
Rugby union
Australia national schoolboy rugby union team
