= Puckett =

Puckett is a surname of French Huguenot origin, an anglicized form of French surnames such as Pouquette or Pouquet meaning "the son of Pouque" or Puck. It is found mostly in North America and the British Isles with the mass emigration of Huguenot families following the St. Bartholomew's Day massacre.

== People ==
- Aaron Jennings Puckett (born 1994), American rapper known as Lil Aaron
- Billy Puckett (born 2007), American football player
- Casey Puckett (born 1972), American alpine skier
- Charlie Puckett (1911–2002), Australian baseball player and cricketer
- Clinton A. Puckett (1926–2002), American Marine, 6th Sergeant Major of the United States Marine Corps
- Elliott Puckett, American drag queen
- Gary Puckett (born 1942), lead singer of Gary Puckett & The Union Gap, an American rock band from the 1960s
- Joel Puckett (born 1977), American composer of concert music
- Kirby Puckett (1960–2006), American baseball player
- Matthew Puckett, American songwriter
- Max Puckett (1935–1991), Australian baseball player and cricketer
- Miller Puckette (born 1959), American academic
- Phillip Puckett (born 1947), American politician, Virginia state senator
- Ralph Puckett (1926–2024), United States Army Ranger in the Korean War
- Riley Puckett (1894–1946), American country music pioneer
- Tim Puckett (born 1962), American amateur astronomer

== Fictional characters ==
- Sam Puckett (iCarly), from the TV show iCarly
- Sam Puckett (Sam & Cat), from the TV show Sam & Cat
- Red Puckett, from the movie Hoodwinked!
