= North Balwyn Baseball Club =

Melbourne suburban baseball club

North Balwyn Stingers

Information
- League: Melbourne Winter Baseball League (A & C grades)
- Location: North Balwyn, Melbourne, Victoria
- Ballpark: Myrtle Park
- Founded: 1937
- Colors: Black, Gold and White

Current uniforms
Current	Former

The North Balwyn Stingers Baseball Club is a Baseball Club based in the Melbourne suburb of North Balwyn. The club's senior teams compete in the Melbourne Winter Baseball League and its Juniors compete in the Ringwood District Baseball League.

== History ==
The North Balwyn Baseball Club was formed in 1937, and played in the Victorian Baseball Association competition. On July 9, 1967 the club opened the first all weather Baseball Diamond in Victoria.

In 2004 the club was down to 2 teams with a total of 20 playing members. The Club set on a rebuilding phase and by 2009 the club was playing in the B grade section of the Melbourne Winter Baseball League, The Club had built up to 5 senior teams and 4 junior teams.

In 2010 the club was promoted to the A grade section after the Knox Falcons requested to be relegated before the 2010 season{source}. In 2012 the club announced Phil Dale as the new club coach and A grade game day manager.
