= 1936 Claxton Shield =

Australian national baseball tournament

Australia Interstate Baseball Carnival
- 1936

Tournament information
- Date: 1 – 8 August
- Host(s): (New South Wales) Sydney, NSW
- Teams: 3
- Defending champions: South Australia

Final positions
- Champion: South Australia (3rd title)
- 1st runner-up: Victoria
- 2nd runner-up: New South Wales

The 1936 Claxton Shield was the third annual Claxton Shield, an Australian national baseball tournament. It was held at Marrickville Oval in Sydney from 3 to 10 August, and was won by South Australia for the third time in a row. The other participating teams were Victoria and hosts New South Wales.

Western Australia applied to join the competition, however the plans for the tournament had already been confirmed between the other three states at that time. Alternate arrangements were made, where Victoria sent a team for a three-game series in September as a way for Western Australia to prepare for their entry in the 1937 tournament.

== Format ==
As had been the case in the two previous editions of the tournament, each team met each other team twice over the course of the week. In each game, two competition points were on offer to the teams. The points were awarded as follows:

- Win – two points
- Tie – one point
- Loss – no points

At the end of the tournament, the team with the most points was declared the winner, and awarded the Claxton Shield. Had there been a tie between New South Wales and Victoria for first place, they would have been declared joint winners. However had South Australia been involved in a tie for first, they would have retained the Shield.

== Results ==
1936 Claxton Shield Champions

South Australia
3rd title

Team	Points	Wins	Ties	Losses
South Australia	6	3	–	1
Victoria	4	2	–	2
New South Wales	2	1	–	3

1 August 1936	New South Wales	3 – 1	Victoria	(New South Wales) Marrickville Oval

1 August 1936	New South Wales	3 – 5	South Australia	(New South Wales) Marrickville Oval

3 August 1936	Victoria	0 – 1	South Australia	(New South Wales) Marrickville Oval

6 August 1936	South Australia	3 – 4	Victoria	(New South Wales) Marrickville Oval

8 August 1936	South Australia	4 – 1	New South Wales	(New South Wales) Marrickville Oval

8 August 1936	Victoria	5 – 4	New South Wales	(New South Wales) Marrickville Oval

== Attempted expansion ==
On 3 June, a letter was received by the Victorian Baseball Association seeking permission for a Western Australian team to compete in the 1936 Claxton Shield. At that point in time, the New South Wales Baseball Association had already confirmed plans with the other state bodies for the tournament, and were advised that it was therefore too late for Western Australia to be admitted. As an alternative, Australian international cricketer Bert Oldfield was appointed as Western Australia's representative for the conference during the tournament to organise the 1937 Claxton Shield in Adelaide, where Western Australia first participated.

In preparation for their admission, the Western Australia Baseball League invited both New South Wales and Victoria to come to Perth to play in an interstate series. Though New South Wales did not participate, Victoria did send a team for a three-game series from 19 to 26 September, which the visitors won two games to one.

== Bibliography ==
- Clark, Joe (2003). A History of Australian Baseball: Time and Game. Lincoln, NE, United States: University of Nebraska Press. ISBN 0-8032-6440-2.
- Harris, John O. (2009). Baseball Queensland 1905-1990. Archived from the original on 6 July 2011.
