= Puckett (disambiguation) =

Puckett is a surname. It may also refer to:

- Puckett, Mississippi, United States, a village
- Puckett Observatory, a private observatory in Georgia, United States
- Puckett Gliderport, a privately owned public-use glider airport in Bedford County, Tennessee, United States
- 32096 Puckett, an asteroid
