= 1946 Claxton Shield =

Australian baseball tournament

Australian Interstate Baseball Carnival
- 1946

Tournament information
- Date: 3 – 10 August
- Host(s): (New South Wales) Sydney, NSW
- Teams: 3
- Defending champions: New South Wales

Final positions
- Champion: New South Wales (4th title)
- 1st runner-up: Victoria
- 2nd runner-up: South Australia

The 1946 Claxton Shield was the seventh annual Claxton Shield, an Australian national baseball tournament—the first time the tournament was held after a seven-year break due to World War II. It was held at Petersham Oval and Marrickville Oval in Sydney from 3 to 10 August, and was won by the hosts New South Wales for the fourth time in a row. With this tournament win, they overtook South Australia as the outright leading state in Claxton Shield tournament wins.

The other participating teams were Victoria and hosts South Australia. The two newest teams to the tournament—Western Australia and Queensland—did not participate. However both did host an interstate series: Western Australia hosted a South Australian team, and Queensland hosted New South Wales after the Sydney season.

== Format ==
With the reduction of participating teams back to the original three, the format also returned to a pure round-robin tournament. Once again, each team met each other team twice over the course of the week. In each game, two competition points were on offer to the teams. The points were awarded as follows:

- Win – two points
- Tie – one point
- Loss – no points

At the end of the tournament, the team with the most points was declared the winner, and awarded the Claxton Shield.

== Results ==
1946 Claxton Shield Champions

New South Wales
4th title

Team	Points	Wins	Ties	Losses
New South Wales	8	4	-	-
Victoria	4	2	-	2
South Australia	0	-	-	4

3 August 1946	New South Wales	9 – 1	South Australia	(New South Wales) Petersham Oval

3 August 1946	New South Wales	3 – 0	Victoria	(New South Wales) Petersham Oval

6 August 1946	Victoria	6 – 4	South Australia	(New South Wales) Petersham Oval

8 August 1946	Victoria	5 – 3	South Australia	(New South Wales) Petersham Oval

10 August 1946	New South Wales	8 – 0	South Australia	(New South Wales) Marrickville Oval

10 August 1946	New South Wales	10 – 2	Victoria	(New South Wales) Marrickville Oval

== All-Australian team ==
At the conclusion of the tournament, representatives from the Australian Baseball Council selected an All-Australian team. It was the second such Australian team selected at the end of a Claxton Shield tournament. As had been the case in the 1939 side, New South Wales players dominated the team, with seven players selected.

Position		Player
Pitcher		(New South Wales) L. Dale
Catcher		(New South Wales) M. Yuille
First Base		(New South Wales) F. Brittain
Second Base		(Victoria (state)) N. Harvey
Third Base		(New South Wales) M. Diegan
Short Stop		(New South Wales) K. Gulliver (c)
Left Field		(New South Wales) H. Hawkins
Centre Field		(South Australia) W. Radbone
Right Field		(Victoria (state)) J. Nagle
Reserve Battery	Pitcher	(New South Wales) R. Lawler
Reserve Battery	Catcher	(South Australia) P. Brideoake
Utility		(Victoria (state)) J. Ellis
Manager		(Victoria (state)) R. Darling

== Bibliography ==
- Clark, Joe (2003). A History of Australian Baseball: Time and Game. Lincoln, NE, United States: University of Nebraska Press. ISBN 0-8032-6440-2.
- Harris, John O. (2009). Baseball Queensland 1905-1990. Archived from the original on 6 July 2011.
