= 1939 Claxton Shield =

Australia Interstate Baseball Carnival
- 1939

Tournament information
- Date: 29 July – 5 August
- Host(s): (Victoria (state)) Melbourne, VIC
- Teams: 5
- Defending champions: New South Wales

Final positions
- Champion: New South Wales (3rd title)
- 1st runner-up: Western Australia
- 2nd runner-up: Victoria

The 1939 Claxton Shield was the sixth annual Claxton Shield, an Australian national baseball tournament. It was held at Richmond Cricket Ground, Albert Ground, South Melbourne Cricket Ground, and National Park in Melbourne from 29 July to 5 August, the second time Melbourne had hosted the Shield. New South Wales won the Shield for the third time, successfully defending their title from the previous two years. Queensland joined the other four states for the first time in the tournament. The other participating teams were Victoria, Western Australia, and South Australia. It was also the first year an Australia national team was picked primarily based on the Championships.

== Format ==
As had been the case in the 1937 tournament, the four teams played a round-robin schedule, meeting each other team once, with two competition points on offer in each game. The points were awarded as follows:

- Win – two points
- Tie – one point
- Loss – no points

At the end of these preliminary games, the top two teams played each other to determine the champions, while the remaining two teams faced each other to determine third place. In the event of a tie between teams in terms of points, the tiebreaker used would have been the net runs for and against, with the team achieving the greater value and placing in the higher position.

== Results ==
=== Preliminaries ===
Team	Points	Wins	Ties	Losses	For-Against
Western Australia	6	3	–	1	+16
New South Wales	5	2	1	1	+23
Victoria	5	2	1	1	+20
South Australia	4	2	–	2	+22
Queensland	0	–	–	4	-81

29 July 1939	Western Australia	2 – 1	South Australia	(Victoria (state)) Richmond Cricket Ground

29 July 1939	Victoria	4 – 4 (F/11)	New South Wales	(Victoria (state)) Richmond Cricket Ground

31 July 1939	Queensland	0 – 23	New South Wales	(Victoria (state)) Albert Ground

31 July 1939	Victoria	2 – 8	Western Australia	(Victoria (state)) Albert Ground

1 August 1939	Victoria	6 – 5	South Australia	(Victoria (state)) Albert Ground

1 August 1939	Western Australia	11 – 1	Queensland	(Victoria (state)) Albert Ground

2 August 1939	Victoria	25 – 0	Queensland	(Victoria (state)) Albert Ground

2 August 1939	New South Wales	3 – 4	South Australia	(Victoria (state)) Albert Ground

3 August 1939	New South Wales	2 – 1	Western Australia	(Victoria (state)) South Melbourne Cricket Ground

3 August 1939	South Australia	24 – 1	Queensland	(Victoria (state)) South Melbourne Cricket Ground

=== Finals ===
==== Third place final ====
5 August 1939	South Australia	2 – 5	Victoria	(Victoria (state)) National Park

==== Championship game ====
5 August 1939	New South Wales	1 – 0	Western Australia	(Victoria (state)) National Park

1939 Claxton Shield Champions

New South Wales
3rd title

== All-Australian team ==
At the conclusion of the tournament, representatives from the Australian Baseball Council selected an All-Australian team. Though the selected team did not actually play together, it was the first time an Australian team had been selected.

Position	Player
Pitcher	(New South Wales) J. Lanfear
Pitcher	(Western Australia) C. Puckett
Catcher	(New South Wales) L. Miller
Catcher	(New South Wales) A. Goodwin
First Base	(Western Australia) A. Barras
Second Base	(South Australia) F. Catt
Third Base	(New South Wales) W. Rankin
Short Stop	(Victoria (state)) R. Corby
Outfield	(New South Wales) N. Blanche
Outfield	(Victoria (state)) S. Yum
Outfield	(Victoria (state)) J. Denison
Utility	(New South Wales) G. Borwick
Manager	(New South Wales) D. Mould

== Bibliography ==
- Clark, Joe (2003). A History of Australian Baseball: Time and Game. Lincoln, NE, United States: University of Nebraska Press. ISBN 0-8032-6440-2.
- Harris, John O. (2009). Baseball Queensland 1905-1990. Archived from the original on 6 July 2011.
