= Josh Tols =

Australian baseball player (born 1989)

Melbourne Aces – No. 21
- Pitcher
- Born: 6 October 1989 (age 37); Adelaide, South Australia
- Bats: Left Throws: Left
- Stats at Baseball Reference

Joshua Peter Tols (born 6 October 1989) is an Australian former professional baseball pitcher.

Tols played college baseball at John Wood Community College and Rockhurst University. Undrafted, he then played three seasons of independent baseball in the Pecos League and American Association of Professional Baseball. He has played for the Adelaide Bite and Melbourne Aces in the Australian Baseball League, a winter league, for several years. He represented Australia at the 2017 World Baseball Classic before signing with the Phillies organization in 2018.

== Early life ==
Tols was born in Adelaide, South Australia, to Peter and Debbie Tols. He attended Seaton High School in Australia. Josh started playing baseball as a junior with the Woodville District Baseball Club where he continued to play while living in Adelaide.

== Playing career ==
=== Amateur ===
==== John Wood Junior College (2009-2010) ====
Tols attended John Wood Community College in Quincy, Illinois in 2009 where he appeared in 13 games as a pitcher, had a 4-3 (win–loss record) 4.87 Earned run average (ERA) record with 44.1 innings pitched in his freshman year. He struck out 46 batters while walking 21 and allowing 51 hits.

As a sophomore, he appeared in 21 games as a pitcher, had a 3-4, 3.09 ERA record with 71 K in 46 2/3 IP and led the nation in strikeouts per inning. He also led the nation in saves, earning himself a place on the all conference team.

In 2017 he was inducted into the college's baseball hall of fame. Over his career he was part of one of the best two year winning percentages in the college programme's history. Josh continues to be a mainstay on many all-time statistical categories, including 1st in single season saves, 2nd in career saves, 4th in single season strikeouts, 4th in career strikeouts.

==== Rockhurst University (2012-2014) ====
In 2012 Tols transferred to continue his college career at Rockhurst University in Kansas City, Missouri. in his first year, he pitch for a record of 6-2 with a 3.36 ERA. He held opposition batters to a .247 batting average, stuck out 66 batters over 67 innings pitched, and recorded four complete games and two shutouts. He was recognised as a member of the All-Great Lakes Valley Conference team.

He redshirted in 2013 due to a shoulder injury. In 2014, as a pitcher he recorded 4-7 (win-loss) with a 2.60 ERA and struck out 71 in 69 1/3 IP. He led the GLVC in strike outs and was second-team All-Conference.

=== Trinidad Triggers ===
He began his pro career with the Trinidad Triggers of the Pecos League. He finished the summer at 5-0, 3.28 with 61 K in 60 1/3 IP. He also hit for a batting average of .269 on base percentage .345 and slugging .308 from 31 plate appearances.

=== Kansas City T-Bones ===
In 2015 Tols signed with the Kansas City T-Bones in the American Association where he went 2-0 with a 4.55 ERA with 49 strike outs over 55.1 innings pitched. In 2016 Tols returned for his final season with the T-Bones where he went 5-4 with a 4.18 ERA with 60 strike outs over 60.1 innings pitched.

=== Niigata Albirex ===
On 1 April 2017, Tols signed with the Niigata Albirex of the Baseball Challenge League.

=== Philadelphia Phillies ===
Tols signed a minor league contract with the Philadelphia Phillies on 9 February 2018. He was assigned to the High-A Clearwater Threshers of the Florida State League to begin the season. Through 4 appearances, including 1 start, he had struck out 13 batters while allowing only 2 hits and posting an ERA of 0.93. He was then promoted to the Double-A Reading Fightin Phils of the Eastern League. He still primarily served as a relief pitcher and accumulated 42 strikeouts and a 3.27 ERA by the season's end. Cumulatively, his first season record stood at 2–1 with a 2.74 ERA over 42 2/3 innings with 55 strikeouts.

For the 2019 campaign, Tols was promoted to the Triple-A Lehigh Valley IronPigs of the International League. Coming on exclusively in relief, he retired 39 batters on strikes and had a 1–1 record with a 3.84 ERA in 79 2/3 innings pitched.

Tols did not play in a game in 2020 due to the cancellation of the Minor League Baseball season because of the COVID-19 pandemic.

On 29 April 2021, Tols was released by the Phillies organization.

=== Kane County Cougars ===
On May 3, 2021, Tols signed with the Kane County Cougars of the American Association of Professional Baseball. Tols played the entire 2021 season with the Cougars, during which he recorded a 4-8 record with a 4.27 ERA and 121 strikeouts in 21 appearances. On May 4, 2022, Tols was released by the Cougars.

== Australian Baseball League ==
Tols made his Australian Baseball League debut in 2010 as a 20-year-old. He pitched 2 1/3 shutout innings for his hometown Adelaide Bite in the 2010-2011 Australian Baseball League (3 H, 1 BB, 1 K).

With Adelaide for the first time in four winters, Josh went 9-2 with a 2.38 ERA and 46 K in 34 IP as a reliever. He led the league in wins (two over Scott Mitchinson and Morgan Coombs) and tied for third with 22 games pitched. He was named the ABL Rookie of the Year and Reliever of the Year, and selected in the Australian team for the Australian Baseball League All-Star Game. In 2015-2016, he remained hot for Adelaide (4-1, Sv, 2.23, .200 opponent average). He was 4th in the ABL in ERA (between Scott Mitchinson and Edwin Carl).

Josh was signed to play for the Melbourne Aces in 2016 where he posted a 3-2 (win-loss), 2 save, 0.92 ERA season with 42 strike outs over 29.2 innings pitched.

After moving to Melbourne Josh also joined the Fitzroy Baseball Club in Division one of the Victorian Summer Baseball League. In his debut season Josh won the Harry Douglas trophy for the league's best pitcher, with an ERA of 0.20 helping Fitzroy to win the league's club championship.

Returning to the Aces Josh increased his workload with 5-3, 1 save, 4.78 ERA season with 75 strike outs over 52.2 innings pitched. Tols was selected as a member of the Australian national baseball team at the 2017 World Baseball Classic and signed by the Philadelphia Phillies organisation. Following his signing by the Phillies Josh was restricted to a light workload in the 2017/18 ABL season pitching only 8 innings over 4 games with the Aces. He had a 1.18 ERA, with 1 win and 9 strike outs.

Tols retired after the 2022–23 Australian Baseball League season in which he pitched for the Claxton Shield-winning Adelaide Giants.

== International career ==
Tols was selected for the Australian national baseball team at the 2017 World Baseball Classic and 2019 WBSC Premier12.

== Coaching career ==
On January 19, 2023, Tols was announced as the rehab pitching coach for the Florida Complex League Twins, the rookie-level affiliate of the Minnesota Twins.
