= Rob Templeton =

Australian cricketer (born 1957)

Robert Ian "Rob" Templeton (born 15 March 1957) is a former Victorian cricketer. He was born in Hamilton, Victoria, Australia.

In 1999, Templeton was named as the wicket-keeper in Melbourne Cricket Club's "Team of the Century". He played in two first-class matches for Victoria in 1982/83.

== See also ==
- List of Victoria first-class cricketers
