= Geelong Baseball Association =

Australian baseball league

The Geelong Baseball Association (GBA), is an Australian baseball association and league based in Geelong, Victoria.

It runs the Geelong Winter League, one of the premier winter competitions in Victoria. The GBA is affiliated with Baseball Victoria.

Established in 1937, the GBA offers senior and junior competitions to clubs and teams from metropolitan Geelong, Colac, Werribee, Bacchus Marsh, Lara, Newport and Ballarat. Competition is conducted from early April through to September.

== History ==
In 1889, the first match of interest played at Geelong between Melbourne and Geelong Baseball Clubs. Melbourne won the game 25–15. The driving force behind the creation of the original Geelong Baseball Club was Charles Brownlow, the namesake of the Brownlow Medal, who served as the inaugural honorary secretary and treasurer.

Established over seventy years ago, in 1937 the GBA offers senior and junior competitions to clubs and teams from metropolitan Geelong, Colac, Werribee, Bacchus Marsh, Lara and Ballarat.

Since the Waurn Ponds Baseball Centre was opened in 2002, Geelong has attracted numerous major baseball events, including Provincial series, international matches, two Japanese training camps, international friendly games, AAA Youth series, Claxton Shield games and Masters series.

== Clubs ==
- Alfredton Eagles
- Bacchus Marsh Tigers
- Ballarat Royals
- Bellarine Bears
- Colac Braves
- Corio Tigers
- Deakin Blues
- East Belmont Saints
- Guild Lions
- Lara Wildcats
- Newport Rams
- Sunshine Eagles

== See also ==
- List of baseball teams in Australia
