= Professional baseball =

Type of baseball where players are paid

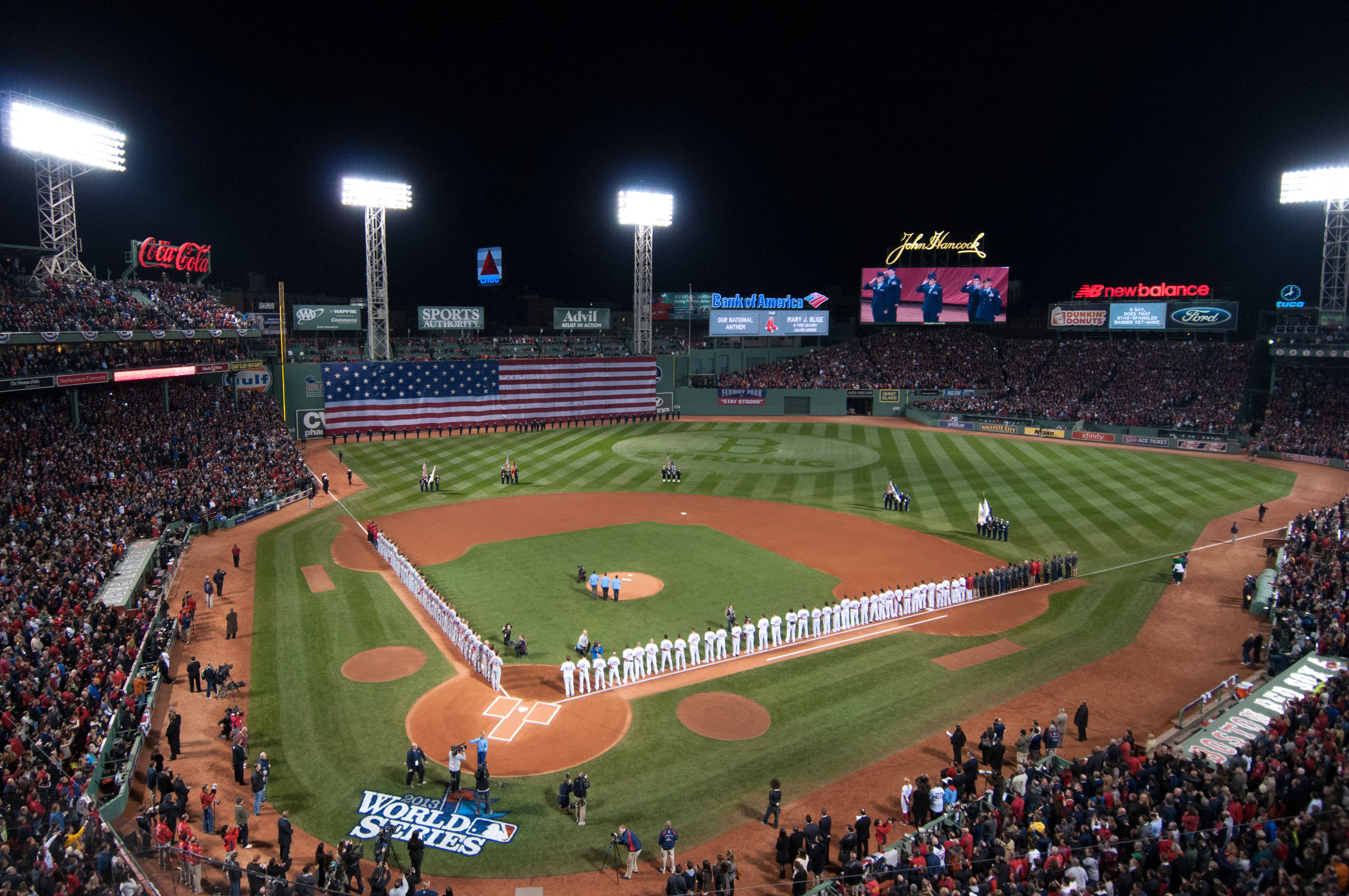
Fenway Park, home of the Boston Red Sox, during the World Series

Professional baseball is organized baseball in which players are selected for their talents and are paid to play for a specific team or club system. It is played in leagues and associated farm teams throughout the world.

== Modern professional leagues ==
=== Americas ===
==== United States and Canada ====
Major League Baseball in the United States and Canada consists of the National League (founded in 1876) and the American League (founded in 1901). Historically, teams in one league never played teams in the other until the World Series, in which the champions of the two leagues played against each other. This changed in 1997 with the advent of interleague play. The Philadelphia Phillies, founded in 1883, are the oldest continuous same-name, same-city franchise in both Major League Baseball and all of American professional sports.

In addition to the major leagues, many North American cities and towns feature minor league teams. An organization officially styled Minor League Baseball, formerly the National Association of Professional Baseball Leagues, oversees nearly all minor league baseball in the United States and Canada. The minor leagues are divided into classes Triple-A, Double-A, High-A, Single-A, and Rookie. These minor-league divisions are affiliated with major league teams, and serve to develop young players and rehabilitate injured major-leaguers. "Affiliated baseball" (archaically, "organized baseball") is often applied as an umbrella term for all leagues — major and minor — under the authority of the Commissioner of Baseball.

Operating outside the Minor League Baseball organization are many independent minor leagues such as the Atlantic League, American Association, Frontier League, and Empire Professional Baseball League.

==== Caribbean countries ====
- Dominican Professional Baseball League (1951–present; winter league)
- Puerto Rico Baseball League (1938–present)
- Cuban National Series (1961–present)

==== Mexico ====
- Mexican Pacific League (1945–present; winter league)
- Mexican League (1925–present; summer league)
  - The Mexican League was formerly part of Minor League Baseball, although with no affiliations to any Major League Baseball teams.

==== Central America ====
- Panamanian Professional Baseball League (1946–1972, 2001–present)
- Nicaraguan Professional Baseball League (1957–1967, 2004–present)

==== South America ====
- Venezuelan Professional Baseball League (1946–present)
- Colombian Professional Baseball League (1948–1958, 1979–1988, 1994–present)

=== Asia ===
==== Japan ====
Japan has had professional baseball since the 1930s. Nippon Professional Baseball consists of two leagues, the Central League and the Pacific League, each with six teams.

==== South Korea ====
South Korea has had professional baseball since 1982. There are 10 teams in KBO League.

==== Taiwan ====
Taiwan has had professional baseball since the 1990s. The Chinese Professional Baseball League absorbed Taiwan Major League in 2003. There are 6 teams in the CPBL.

==== Other Asian leagues ====
Other Asian leagues include three now defunct leagues, the China National Baseball League, Israel Baseball League, and Baseball Philippines.

=== Europe ===
- Italian Baseball League
- Honkbal Hoofdklasse (Dutch league)
- Elitserien (Sweden)
- Deutsche Baseball Liga (Germany)

=== Australia ===
- Australian Baseball League
- Greater Brisbane League
- New South Wales Major League

== Historic leagues ==
During the late 19th and early 20th centuries, players of black African descent were barred from playing the major leagues, though several did manage to play by claiming to be Cubans or Native Americans. As a result, a number of parallel Negro leagues were formed. However, after Jackie Robinson began playing with the major-league Brooklyn Dodgers in 1947, the Negro leagues gradually faded. The process of integration did not go entirely smoothly; there were some ugly incidents, including pitchers who would try to throw directly at a black player's head. Now, however, baseball is fully integrated, and there is little to no racial tension between teammates.

Between 1943 and 1954, the All-American Girls Professional Baseball League fielded teams in several Midwestern towns.

== See also ==
- Baseball § Around-the-world
- Baseball awards § International
- List of organized baseball leagues § Professional baseball
- Professional sports
