= 1963 Claxton Shield =

1963 Claxton Shield Champions

New South Wales
9th title

The 1963 Claxton Shield was the 24th annual Claxton Shield, it was held at the Brisbane Cricket Ground and Bannister Park in Brisbane, Queensland. The participants were South Australia, New South Wales, Victoria, Western Australia and Queensland. The series was won by New South Wales claiming their ninth Shield title and first since the 1955 Claxton Shield.

The Helms Award was given to Kevin Cantwell from New South Wales.

== Championship Table ==
| Team | Played | Wins | Loss | Drew | Points |
|---|---|---|---|---|---|
| New South Wales | 8 | 6 | 1 | 1 | 13 |
| Victoria | 8 | 6 | 2 | | 12 |
| South Australia | 8 | 4 | 4 | | 8 |
| Western Australia | 8 | 3 | 4 | 1 | 7 |
| Queensland | 8 | | 8 | | 0 |
