= 1938 Claxton Shield =

Australia Interstate Baseball Carnival
- 1938

Tournament information
- Date: 6 – 13 August
- Host(s): Perth, Western Australia
- Teams: 4
- Defending champions: New South Wales

Final positions
- Champion: New South Wales (2nd title)
- 1st runner-up: Western Australia
- 2nd runner-up: South Australia

The 1938 Claxton Shield was the fifth annual Claxton Shield, an Australian national baseball tournament. It was held at the WACA Ground and Subiaco Oval in Perth from 3 to 13 August, the first time Perth had hosted the Shield. New South Wales won the Shield for the second time, successfully defending their title from the previous year. Hosts Western Australia had their best finish, losing to New South Wales in the final to finish second overall. The other participating teams were Victoria and South Australia.

== Format ==
As had been the case in the 1937 tournament, the four teams played a round-robin schedule, meeting each other team once, with two competition points were on offer in each game. The points were awarded as follows:

- Win – two points
- Tie – one point
- Loss – no points

At the end of these preliminary games, the top two teams played each other to determine the champions, while the remaining two teams faced each other to determine third place. In the event of a tie between teams in terms of points, the tiebreaker used would have been the net runs for and against, with the team achieving the greater value placing in the higher position.

== Results ==
=== Preliminaries ===
Team	Points	Wins	Ties	Losses	For-Against
New South Wales	4	2	–	1	+4
Western Australia	4	2	–	1	-1
South Australia	2	1	–	2	+5
Victoria	2	1	–	2	-8

6 August 1937	Victoria	0 – 7	South Australia	(Western Australia) WACA Ground

6 August 1937	New South Wales	4 – 0	Western Australia	(Western Australia) WACA Ground

9 August 1937	New South Wales	2 – 3	Victoria	(Western Australia) Subiaco Oval

9 August 1937	South Australia	1 – 2	Western Australia	(Western Australia) Subiaco Oval

11 August 1937	Western Australia	2 – 0	Victoria	(Western Australia) WACA Ground

11 August 1937	South Australia	1 – 2	New South Wales	(Western Australia) WACA Ground

=== Finals ===
==== Third place final ====
13 August 1937	Victoria	0 – 9	South Australia	(Western Australia) Subiaco Oval

==== Championship game ====
13 August 1937	Western Australia	0 – 2	New South Wales	(Western Australia) Subiaco Oval

1938 Claxton Shield Champions

New South Wales
2nd title

== Bibliography ==
- Clark, Joe (2003). A History of Australian Baseball: Time and Game. Lincoln, NE, United States: University of Nebraska Press. ISBN 0-8032-6440-2.
- Harris, John O. (2009). Baseball Queensland 1905-1990. Archived from the original on 6 July 2011.
