= Baseball ACT =

Baseball ACT is the governing body of Baseball within the Australian Capital Territory. Baseball ACT is governed by the Australian Baseball Federation
