= 1935 Claxton Shield =

Australia Interstate Baseball Carnival
- 1935

Tournament information
- Date: 3 – 10 August
- Host(s): (Victoria (state)) Melbourne, VIC
- Teams: 3
- Defending champions: South Australia

Final positions
- Champion: South Australia (2nd title)
- 1st runner-up: New South Wales
- 2nd runner-up: Victoria

The 1935 Claxton Shield was the second annual Claxton Shield, an Australian national baseball tournament. It was held at the Albert Ground and the Melbourne Cricket Ground in Melbourne from 3 to 10 August, and was won by South Australia for the second time in a row. The other participating teams were New South Wales and hosts Victoria.

== Format ==
As had been the case in the 1934 tournament, each team met each other team twice over the course of the week. In each game, two competition points were on offer to the teams. The points were awarded as follows:

- Win – two points
- Tie – one point
- Loss – no points

At the end of the tournament, the team with the most points was declared the winner, and awarded the Claxton Shield. Had there been a tie between New South Wales and Victoria for first place, they would have been declared joint winners. However had South Australia been involved in a tie for first, they would have retained the Shield.

== Results ==
1935 Claxton Shield Champions

South Australia
2nd title

Team	Points	Wins	Ties	Losses
South Australia	5	2	1	1
New South Wales	4	2	–	2
Victoria	3	1	1	2

3 August 1935	New South Wales	1 – 4	Victoria	(Victoria (state)) Albert Ground

3 August 1935	Victoria	0 – 5	South Australia	(Victoria (state)) Albert Ground

6 August 1935	South Australia	3 – 0	New South Wales	(Victoria (state)) Melbourne Cricket Ground

8 August 1935	New South Wales	13 – 1	South Australia	(Victoria (state)) Melbourne Cricket Ground

10 August 1935	Victoria	1 – 2 (F/11)	New South Wales	(Victoria (state)) Melbourne Cricket Ground

10 August 1935	South Australia	0 – 0 (F/15)	Victoria	(Victoria (state)) Melbourne Cricket Ground

== Bibliography ==
- Clark, Joe (2003). A History of Australian Baseball: Time and Game. Lincoln, NE, United States: University of Nebraska Press. ISBN 0-8032-6440-2.
- Harris, John O. (2009). Baseball Queensland 1905-1990. Archived from the original on 6 July 2011.
