= 1988 Claxton Shield =

1988 Claxton Shield Champions

Queensland
4th title

The 1988 Claxton Shield was the 49th annual Claxton Shield. The participants were South Australia, New South Wales Patriots, Victoria Aces, Western Australia, Queensland Rams and Northern Territory. The series was won by Queensland claiming their fourth and second consecutive Shield title.

The Helms Award was given to Tony Adamson from Western Australia while the Golden Arm was given to Adrian Meagher of Queensland and the batting award to Dave Nilsson of Queensland.
