= 1955 Claxton Shield =

Baseball competition

1955 Claxton Shield Champions

New South Wales
8th title

The 1955 Claxton Shield was the 16th annual Claxton Shield, and was held in Sydney. The participants were hosts New South Wales, Queensland, South Australia, defending champions Victoria and Western Australia. The series was won by the New South Wales for their eighth Shield title.

== Results ==
Western Australia	8 – 2	New South Wales

Queensland	1 – 12	South Australia

New South Wales	6 – 3	Victoria

Victoria	3 – 0	New South Wales

Queensland	0 – 10	New South Wales

Queensland	3 – 7	Victoria

Western Australia	3 – 2	South Australia

New South Wales	3 – 1	South Australia

Queensland	2 – 0	Western Australia

Semi-Final	Victoria	5 – 3	South Australia

Final	New South Wales	7 – 1	Victoria
