= Max Puckett =

Australian baseball player and cricketer (1935–1991)

Personal information
- Full name: Maxwell Charles Puckett
- Born: 3 June 1935; Unley Park, South Australia, Australia
- Died: 25 August 1991 (aged 56); North Adelaide, South Australia, Australia
- Batting: Right-handed
- Bowling: Right-arm fast-medium
- Role: Bowler
- Relatives: CW Puckett (father)

Domestic team information
- Years: Team
- 1964: South Australia

Career statistics
Competition	First-class
Matches	1
Runs scored	1
Batting average	n/a
100s/50s	0/0
Top score	1*
Balls bowled	224
Wickets	2
Bowling average	60.50
5 wickets in innings	0
10 wickets in match	0
Best bowling	1/59
Catches/stumpings	2/-
- Source: CricketArchive, 16 November 2012

Maxwell Charles Puckett (3 June 1935 – 25 August 1991) was an Australian and cricket and baseball player.

== Biography ==
The son of Charlie Puckett, who also played both sports at interstate level, Puckett was born in Adelaide, South Australia, but moved interstate twice as a result of his father's sporting career—firstly, to Melbourne, and then to Perth, Western Australia, where he spent most of his early life. He played both baseball and cricket growing up, playing as a pitcher for the Nedlands Baseball Club and as a fast bowler for West Perth in the WACA district cricket competition. Puckett had made his First Grade cricket debut for West Perth at the age of 17, during the 1952–53 season. In both sports, he often played alongside his father, with the pair either opening the bowling for West Perth or serving as Nedlands' battery. Puckett was selected as the pitcher for the Western Australian state team at the 1954 Claxton Shield, with his father serving as the side's captain-coach. He was subsequently forced to miss portions of seasons of both sports due to mandatory national service.

Puckett later returned to South Australia with his father, and took up playing for the West Torrens Baseball Club in the South Australian Baseball League. At the 1956 Summer Olympics, held in Melbourne, he represented the Australian national baseball team at the baseball tournament, a demonstration event. Puckett went to play for Australia in 1957, 1961, 1964, and 1965. Also continuing to play cricket, he played one first-class match for South Australia during the 1964–65 Sheffield Shield season, taking two wickets.

Puckett died in North Adelaide in 1991, aged 56, predeceasing his father by eleven years. A number of awards in South Australian baseball are named after him, including the Max Puckett Memorial Award, the Max Puckett Medal, and the Max Puckett Junior Scholarship.
