= Bendigo Baseball Association =

Baseball league located in Bendigo, Australia

- Sport: Baseball
- Divisions: 3 Senior, 17U, U15, U13 & T-Ball
- No. of teams: 5
- Headquarters: Albert Roy Reserve
- Region: City of Greater Bendigo
- Official website: https://bendigobaseball.com.au/

The Bendigo Baseball Association (BBA), is an Australian baseball association and league based in Bendigo, Victoria. Its headquarters are located at the Albert Roy Reserve in Eaglehawk.

The BBA runs senior and junior winter baseball competitions involving clubs from Bendigo and surrounding regions, with current competing clubs based in Eaglehawk, Quarry Hill, Strathfieldsaye and Malmsbury. Competition is conducted from April through to September, among three senior divisions and junior divisions for the 17U, U15 and U13 age groups as well as a T-Ball competition for younger participants.

The BBA is affiliated with Baseball Victoria and hosts the U14 State Winter Championships and All Girl's Invitational annual tournaments. They also compete at all levels of the State Winter Championship tournaments, sending representative teams away to all junior, senior and women's divisions.

== Clubs ==
- Bendigo East
- Central Vic Rangers
- Falcons
- Scots
- Strathfieldsaye Dodgers

== See also ==
- List of baseball teams in Australia
