= Baseball NSW =

Australian governing body for baseball

Baseball NSW is the governing body of baseball within New South Wales (NSW). Baseball NSW is governed by the Australian Baseball Federation. It is located in Rooty Hill in Greater Western Sydney, and is based at Blacktown Baseball Stadium

Baseball NSW is responsible for selecting the NSW Sydney Blue Sox team to compete in the Claxton Shield; an annual, national baseball competition currently contested by the five mainland states of Australia. It governs all levels of baseball in the state, and directly runs the NSW Major League, considered to be the top level of competition in the state and the source of the majority of Australian-based players selected for the NSW Sydney Blue Sox.

== Competitions ==
=== Seniors ===
Baseball NSW run events throughout the year for both the metropolitan Sydney area and country regions of NSW. Their major competition is the Senior and U/18's State League competition that runs over the course of Spring/Summer annually. The Senior State League has 3 graded divisions.

Baseball NSW also provide a Sydney Winter Baseball League, which was established in 1901, and is a baseball competition for metropolitan Sydney at a representative level. The competition has been developed from a small group of enthusiasts to a competitive eight-team League to focus on the development of elite players in the state.

=== Juniors ===
Baseball NSW juniors are given the opportunity to compete at club level and representative levels for both the association and the state. With 12 affiliated associations across the Metropolitan and Country regions of NSW there are a multitude of clubs to play with. The Juniors can participate in club competitions that run either in Summer (October-March) or Winter (April-September).

=== Representative ===
There are both Senior and Junior representative opportunities in the pathways of NSW Metropolitan or Country.

State representative opportunities include the annual National Youth Championships in both the U16 and U18 age divisions for either Metropolitan or Country NSW teams.

Baseball NSW also provide High Performance programs.

== Baseball 5 ==
Baseball 5 is a Baseball variant that is currently being run in the BNSW organisation. The sport, originating from Cuba, in the Caribbean, is anticipated to be one of Baseball NSW's biggest competitions, currently running programs in schools that allow juniors to get a taste for the skills of the game. This fun game is also allowing for greater participation, allowing all abilities to get involved in the sport.

== See also ==
- Australian Baseball Federation
- New South Wales Major League
- Sydney Blue Sox
