= New South Wales Major League =

Baseball League in Australia

NSW State Baseball League
- Sport: Baseball
- Founded: 1899
- No. of teams: 8
- Country: Australia
- Most recent champions: 1st Grade Premiers: Blacktown Workers; Club Championship: Blacktown Workers
- Most titles: 1st Grade Premierships: Canterbury Bankstown Vikings(9); Club Championships: Baulkham Hills (13)
- Related competitions: Australian Baseball League; Sydney Winter Baseball League
- Website: NSW State Baseball League

The NSW State Baseball League (previously known as the New South Wales Major League) is the highest amateur level of play for the sport of baseball in New South Wales. The league is currently composed of 8 baseball clubs from Sydney. The current 1st Grade Champions are the Blacktown Workers, and the current Club Champions are also the Blacktown Workers.

== Structure ==
The NSW State Baseball League is composed of four separate divisions of play. Each club participating is required to field a team in each division, of:

- 1st Grade
- 2nd Grade
- 3rd Grade
- Under 18s

The teams play a round-robin format of games that forms the regular season. The teams in each division are ranked on their win/loss percentage, dividing the number of wins (counting ties as a half win) by the number of games played. The four highest-placed teams from each division progressing to compete in their respective finals series in the post-season, to determine the four division Premiers. The finals are played at the neutral venue of Blacktown International Sportspark, one of the venues for baseball during the 2000 Sydney Olympics, and home of the Sydney Blue Sox during the Australian Baseball League

At the end of the regular season, the Club Championship is calculated by taking each grade's win/loss percentage, and multiplying it by a maximum number of Club Championship points that would have been available in that grade, had a full season been played (some games being cancelled due to rain-outs).

Grade	Points Per Game	Games (2011/12)	Maximum Points
1st Grade	150	36	5,400
2nd Grade	100	18	1,800
3rd Grade	50	18	900
Under 18s	75	18	1,350

Then, 100 bonus points are added for each occasion where a club wins a "clean sweep" (win all divisions) over their opponent in a particular round. The club with the highest total are declared the Club Champions.

== Teams ==
The following 8 clubs competed in the 2021–22 season.

Club	Team Name	Home Ground(s)	Location	Club Championships	Grade Premierships			
Club	Team Name	Home Ground(s)	Location	Club Championships	1st	2nd	3rd	U/18
Baulkham Hills	Kookaburras	Kellyville Park; Northmead Reserve	Kellyville, Sydney; Northmead, Sydney	13^{‡†}	7	9^{†}	7^{†}	4
Blacktown	Workers	Laybutt Reserve	Huntingwood, Sydney	-	1	-	-	1^{‡}
Canterbury Bankstown	Vikings	Riverside Park	Riverwood, Sydney	-	9^{†}	1	6	3
				1	1	3^{‡}	-	1
Cronulla Sutherland	Sharks	Tonkin Oval	Cronulla, Sydney	2	1	3	4	5^{†}
Macarthur	Orioles	Gilchrist Oval	Campbelltown, Sydney	-	1	-	1	-
Manly	Eagles	Aquatic Reserve	Frenchs Forest, Sydney	-	2	3	-	5^{†}
Greater Western	Warriors	Field of Dreams	Pen Sydney	-	1^{‡}	-	-	-
Ryde	Hawks	ELS Hall Park	North Ryde, Sydney	6	3	3	5^{‡}	1

- ^{‡} - signifies current champion/premier
- ^{†} - signifies most championships/premierships by an active club
- most championships/premierships by any club, where held by a non-active club;

- 1st Grade: 17 - 2nd Grade: 19 - 3rd Grade: 16

- ^{&} Macarthur Colts merged with Auburn Orioles in 2010/11. Prior to the merger Macarthur had one 1st Grade title and one 3rd Grade title.

== History ==
The NSW Baseball Association (the precursor to Baseball NSW) was first established in 1894. But it was not until 1899 that what is now known as the NSW Major League was played, with Redfern as the inaugural winners. The league expanded in 1901 to include a second grade, with clubs fielding teams in both. Paddington won the premiership for both grades that year, a feat which has been achieved a total of 27 times over the 107 seasons of Second Grade played.

The League expanded again in 1911 to three grades. Though First and Second Grades have both been contested continuously since their respective introductions, Third Grade initially only lasted until the 1915 season. It was reintroduced for the 1918 and continued through to 1941. The league expanded to three grades once more in 1944, and with the exception of the following year has continued as such since.

1973 was the final year that the League played during the winter months, as the Australian Baseball Federation decided to make baseball a summer sport. The move was designed to allow more favourable weather conditions for spectators and players alike, and to bring it in line with baseball in the United States. This saw the creation of the Sydney Winter League in 1974, and the first summer season of the NSW Major League played in 1974–75.

A Club Championship was introduced for the 1980–81 season, which was used to determine the best performing club over the three grades. Auburn was the first club to win the Championship, winning nine times in the first twelve seasons.

An Under 18s competition was incorporated into the League for the 1985–86 season, with Baulkham Hills the inaugural winners.

=== All-star games ===
The league first considered an all-star game in the offseason of 2001, with the first NSWML All Star Games held during the season's Christmas break on 12 January 2002, held at ELS Hall Park. Three games were played: First Grade, Second Grade, and a combined Third Grade/Under 18s game. To determine the makeup of the teams, the teams were the 'Odds' and the 'Evens', based on their position at the time of the game. The 'Evens' won all three games.

From the 2003–04 season it was decided that the teams in the all-star games would be determined geographically:

- North East division – including Central Coast, Cronulla, Manly Warringah, & Ryde Eastwood
- South West division – including Baulkham Hills, Blacktown, Canterbury, Macarthur & Penrith

Since the switch to geographic-based all-star teams, no division won both the First & Second Grade games in the same season.

In addition to the all-star games, a home run derby has been held each season (with the exception of the 2006–07 season). Only Dane Tomaszewski has won the home run derby more than once, winning it in both 2002-03 and 2003–04, representing Blacktown both times.

The NSW State Baseball League All Star games were dropped from the season program after the 2012/13 season due to being deemed unnecessary with the majority of elite players being selected to play in the Australian Baseball League.

Since season 2013/14, a two-game pre-season series has been contested between the Sydney Blue Sox squad and a NSW State Baseball League All-Stars team. These games serve as a pre-season warm-up for the Sydney Blue Sox and as talent identification for the Sydney Blue Sox coaching staff who have the best players in the NSW State Baseball League on show.

In season 2014/15, the Sydney Blue Sox also added a one off pre-season game against a NSW State Baseball League club 1st Grade side to their pre-season schedule. Their opposition in 2014/15 were the eventual NSW State Baseball League champions, the Penrith Panthers, who drew with the Sydney Blue Sox 2–2 after 9 complete innings at which point the game ended as extra innings were deemed not necessary for a pre-season game.

== See also ==
- Baseball NSW
- Australian Baseball Federation
- Baseball awards § Australia
