= Australian Schoolboys national baseball team =

The Australian Schoolboys national baseball team is the national team for secondary school students in Australia. In 2007 the team toured Virginia, Washington and British Columbia, playing 13 matches from a variety of club, college and MLB scout teams, with a 9–1–3 record.

The Australian Secondary Schools Baseball Team initially toured in 1992 with a seven-game tour of Japan. The team finished the tour with a 3.5/3.5 win–loss record against some of Japan's leading prefectures. In 1995, the Australian Secondary Schools Baseball Team toured Canada participating in the BC Falls Classic and won all 10 matches. The team also toured to Florida in 2000.

Tours continued in 2005, with a tour to South Africa, and again in 2007 to Canada, the national team undertakes an international tour every second year.

Notable players include Jacob Reust, New South Wales Patriots David Kandilas and Queensland Rams and ABF Players Player of the Year, James Linger.

== 2009 Tour ==
The Australian schoolboys team toured Oregon, California and Arizona in 2009, playing 16 games finishing with an 11–5 record over the course of 19 days.

The team played in the Arizona Fall Classic, defeating San Diego in the quarter-final and being knocked out by Colorado in the semi-final. The team won best sportsmanship for the tournament.

2009 Schoolboys Results

| 25 September | Linn Benton Community College | 6–2 | Australia | Albany, Oregon |

| 26 September | Kansas City Scouts | 10–1 | Australia | Goss Stadium |

| 27 September | North-West Oregon All-Stars | 3–4 | Australia | Goss Stadium |

| 28 September | Lane Community College | 4–7 | Australia | Eugene, Oregon |

| 29 September | Chemeketa Community College | 7–17 | Australia | Salem, Oregon |

| 1 October | Clackamas Community College | 5–7 | Australia | Oregon City, Oregon |

| 2 October | Mt. Hood Community College | 1–7 | Australia | Gresham, Oregon |

| 5 October | Placentia Mustangs | 0–2 | Australia | Placentia, California |

| 5 October | Placentia Mustangs | 3–7 | Australia | Placentia, California |

| 6 October | Fullerton Junior College | 4–1 | Australia | Fullerton, California |

| 6 October | Fullerton Junior College | 11–4 | Australia | Fullerton, California |

| 9 October | Calgary | 1–9 | Australia | Peoria Sports Complex |

| 9 October | Arizona Athletics | 2–7 | Australia | Peoria Sports Complex |

| 10 October | Southern California Outlaws | 2–14 | Australia | Peoria Sports Complex |

| 11 October | San Diego | 2–4 | Australia | Peoria Sports Complex |

| 11 October | Colorado | 4–3 | Australia | Peoria Sports Complex |
