= 1966 Claxton Shield =

- 1966

Tournament information
- Host(s): (South Australia) Adelaide, SA
- Teams: 5
- Defending champions: (Victoria (state)) Victoria

Final positions
- Champion: South Australia (9th title)
- Runner-up: Victoria

The 1966 Claxton Shield was the 27th annual Claxton Shield, it was held in Adelaide, South Australia. The participants were South Australia, New South Wales, Victoria, Western Australia and Queensland. The series was won by South Australia who finished ahead of Victoria on run percentage for their 9th title.

The standard of the tournament was of poor quality with 114 errors committed over the 20 games. The 1966 Shield also marked the start of modern Australian players getting signed to the Major League system with Neil Page of South Australia getting signed to the Cincinnati Reds and Sid Thompson from New South Wales signing with the Philadelphia Phillies. Both players were released at the end of the 1967 Major League Baseball season.
