= Melbourne Cricket Club =

Sports club in Melbourne, Victoria, Australia

- Full name: Melbourne Cricket Club
- Sports: List: Cricket; Australian rules football; (Melbourne FC); (Women's Football); Baseball; (Melbourne BC); Bowls; Croquet; Field hockey; Golf; Lacrosse; Netball; Squash; Target shooting; Real tennis; Tennis
- Founded: 15 November 1838; 188 years ago
- Based in: Melbourne
- Stadium: Melbourne Cricket Ground
- Colours
- Owner: Melbourne Cricket Club
- President: Fred Oldfield
- CEO: Stuart Fox
- Website: www.mcc.org.au

The Melbourne Cricket Club (MCC) is an Australian sporting club based at the Melbourne Cricket Ground (MCG) in Melbourne, Victoria. Founded in 1838, it is one of Australia's oldest sporting organisations and has played a prominent role in the development of cricket, Australian rules football and organised sport in Australia. Its membership numbers more than 155,000.

The club has managed the MCG since 1853, when it was granted occupancy of the present site, and has been responsible for much of the ground's subsequent development. While the MCG is overseen by the government-appointed Melbourne Cricket Ground Trust, its management is vested in the MCC under an agreement extending to 2042.

Although established as a cricket club, the MCC developed into a multi-sport organisation and today incorporates sporting sections in baseball, bowls, cricket, croquet, football, golf, hockey, lacrosse, netball, real tennis, squash, target shooting and tennis; the Melbourne Football Club is also a sporting section of the club. The club fields teams in the Victorian Premier Cricket competition with its First XI being the most successful team winning 22 premierships.

During the nineteenth and early twentieth centuries, the MCC was a major administrator and promoter of cricket in Australia, organising intercolonial and international matches and tours and hosting the first Test match in 1877. The club and its members also played an important role in the early development of Australian rules football, with the first codified rules of the Melbourne Football Club being drawn up in 1859 and matches under those rules subsequently played at the MCG.

== History ==
=== Foundations and early years ===
The Melbourne Cricket Club was established in 1838 three years after the founding of Melbourne. On 15 November five men: Frederick Powlett, Robert Russell, George Brunswick Smyth and brothers Alfred and Charles Mundy, met to establish the club. The first cricket match occurred a week later in an open field at what is today the site of the Royal Mint.

Portrait of Frederick Powlett that is displayed on Level 2 of the MCC Members' Reserve. Powlett was the first President of the club and for many years was described as the best cricketer in Victoria.

The club initially played at several locations around the young settlement, including near Batman's Hill and later on the southern bank of the Yarra River. In 1839 it had 20 members and Powlett was elected the inaugural President in 1841.

In 1846 it was reorganised as a permanent year-round club, rather than suspending its activities during winter. The term Melbourne Cricket Ground was first used during this period for the club's then ground south of the Yarra.

In 1853, the construction of the first railway line to Sandridge divided the cricket ground. The MCC was granted use of land in Yarra Park where a new cricket ground was established, which became the present-day Melbourne Cricket Ground. The First Members Pavillion was erected in 1854 and the first match on the ground was played amongst members on 30 September. The MCC has occupied and managed the ground since that time.

=== Development of Australian cricket ===
During the nineteenth century the MCC became one of the principal organisations responsible for the development and administration of cricket in Victoria. In 1851 it played the first 'first class' cricket match in Australia and the first inter-colonial match under the name 'Port Phillip' against Van Diemen's Land in Launceston. In 1856, it issued a challenge to cricketers throughout the Australian colonies, resulting in an intercolonial match between Victoria and New South Wales at the MCG. Such matches were predecessors of the later Sheffield Shield competition.

The MCC also played an important role in the development of international cricket in Australia. It was involved in organising and financing tours by English teams to Australia and Australian teams to England during the nineteenth century. The MCG hosted the first Test match, between Australia and England, in March 1877, establishing the ground as one of the principal venues of international cricket.

The club's administrative role in Victorian cricket gradually diminished following the establishment and growth of the Victorian Cricket Association, which assumed responsibility for the administration of the game in the state in the early twentieth century. The MCC nevertheless continued to field its own cricket teams.

=== Expansion beyond cricket ===
Although established as a cricket club, the MCC developed into a broader sporting organisation during the late nineteenth and twentieth centuries.

MCC members played an important role in the early development of Australian rules football. When Tom Wills wrote his 1858 letter proposing that cricketers form a football club to maintain their fitness during winter, he was serving as secretary of the MCC. Wills and several other MCC members subsequently helped establish the Melbourne Football Club and codified its first rules in 1859. The MCC assumed control of the football club in 1890, and Melbourne remained part of the MCC until becoming a separately incorporated entity in 1980. The football club rejoined the MCC as an affiliated sporting section in 2009.

The MCC also promoted a range of other sports. It opened a bowling green on Punt Road in 1865, while tennis courts were established at the MCG in 1879 and baseball was played at the ground during the 1880s. Bowling greens were constructed at the MCG in 1894. Other sporting sections were subsequently established or affiliated with the club, including lacrosse in 1896, rifle shooting in 1900 and hockey in 1961. Squash courts were added to the MCG in 1968.

=== Development of the MCG ===
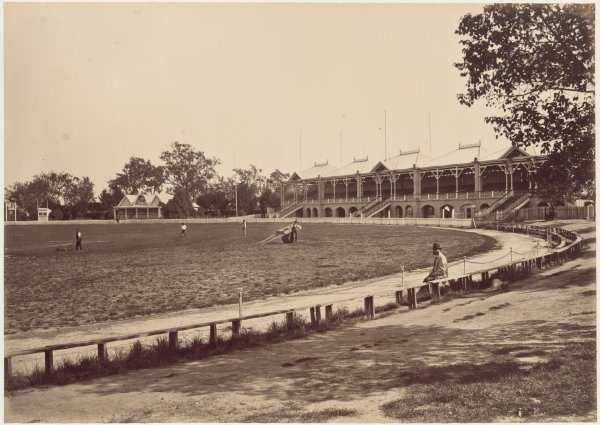
The MCG in 1878. The First Members Pavillion (1853) is the small building on the left, with the Grandstand (1876) to its right.

The MCC has been the principal manager and developer of the Melbourne Cricket Ground for almost its entire existence. From 1853, the MCC effectively drove the MCG's physical development. It improved the playing surface and drainage, constructed pavilions and grandstands, and progressively expanded spectator facilities as attendances increased. The first Members Pavillion was constructed in 1853 with a seating capacity of 60. A more substantial edifice for the members was built in 1881. It was extended in 1886 at a cost of just under £6000 and demolished in 1927 to make way for the Third Members Pavilion, which was completed in 1928 at a cost of £60,000.In 1906 construction of a new grandstand began in the Members' Reserve adjascent to the Members Pavillion. It was known from 1912 as the Grey Smith Stand and was demolished in 1966 for the construction of the Ponsford Stand. In late 2002 the Members Pavillion, Ponsford Stand and Olympic Stands were progressively demolished with the completion of a new continuous section completed for the 2006 Commonwealth Games.

For much of its history, the MCC financed the MCG’s public grandstands through members’ subscriptions including the first Grandstand built in 1876. The 1956 Olympic Stand was an exception: the Victorian Government advanced £100,000 towards its construction, while the MCC increased membership to help meet the cost. Larger redevelopments required borrowing and government support. The MCC financed the $150 million Great Southern Stand, completed in 1992, with borrowings guaranteed by the Victorian Government. The 2006 redevelopment of the ground’s northern side was supported by $77 million in state grants and a government-guaranteed loan facility to the MCC.

== Membership ==
The MCC is the largest sporting club in Australia consisting of more than 155,000 members and approximately 118,000 on the waiting list to join. Membership numbers of the club have increased substantially throughout time from 20 full members in 1839 to 204 in 1858, 1,500 in 1881, 9,800 in 1956, and 57,000 in 2006.

Membership is divided into several categories, principally Provisional, Restricted and Full membership, with access rights increasing at each level. Provisional members have limited access to major events, while Restricted members may attend most AFL and cricket matches in the Members Reserve. Full members receive access to all AFL matches at the MCG (including the AFL Grand Final) as well as international and domestic cricket (including the Boxing Day Test).

Prospective members must be nominated by two existing Full members before joining the waiting list. Admission is highly competitive and progression through the membership categories can take many years. For the 2026–27 season, candidates nominated between May 2009 and March 2010 were offered Provisional membership, while members originally nominated in 1994 were being elevated to Full membership.

Members also have access to the club's dining facilities, sporting sections, special-interest groups and reciprocal arrangements with other sporting clubs in Australia and overseas. Members reaching 50 years receive a distinct membership status, dedicated seating and access to special functions, including an annual 50-Year Member luncheon.

For most of its history, MCC membership was restricted to men. Women were first admitted as members in 1984, following changes to the club's rules. Women's participation in MCC sport subsequently expanded, with women's teams established across several sporting sections, including cricket.

=== Reciprocal clubs ===
Members of the MCC are able to access the members' area of reciprocal clubs, typically while on a short visit to the area. These benefits, with the exclusion of the VRC and Docklands Stadium, are reserved for full members. These clubs include:

- Docklands Stadium Axcess One, Melbourne
- Victoria Racing Club (VRC), Melbourne
- Sydney Cricket Ground, Sydney
- Brisbane Cricket Ground Trust (Gabba), Brisbane
- South Australian Cricket Association (Adelaide Oval), Adelaide
- West Australian Cricket Association (WACA Ground), Perth
- Tasmanian Cricket Association (Bellerive Oval), Hobart

Also other overseas grounds, including the Singapore and Hong Kong Cricket Clubs, the Cricket Club of India and the Marylebone Cricket Club (Lord's).

== Melbourne Cricket Ground ==
=== Management ===
In addition to administering the club and its sporting sections, the MCC acts as manager of the Melbourne Cricket Ground and Yarra Park on behalf of the Melbourne Cricket Ground Trust. The Trust meets bi-monthly to discuss general policy on ground management and development. All trustees are State Government nominees. The Hon Steve Bracks is its current Chair. This dual role gives the MCC responsibilities both as a private membership organisation and as the manager of a major public sporting venue. The current agreement between the MCC and the MCG Trust expires in 2042.

The MCC Members' Reserve

=== Members' Reserve ===
The MCC Members' Reserve is a designated area of the MCG reserved primarily for MCC members and their guests. It occupies part of the northern side of the stadium and includes seating, dining rooms, bars and other member facilities. It is distinguished from other sections of the ground by its green coloured seating. The Members' Reserve has been a feature of the MCG for much of its history and has expanded and changed substantially through successive redevelopments of the ground.

Access to the reserve varies according to membership category and event. Full members generally receive the broadest access, including to major cricket matches and AFL fixtures, while other membership categories are subject to additional restrictions. The reserve operates under its own dress and behavioural standards and is one of the principal benefits associated with MCC membership.

The Members' Reserve is accessed through Gate 2 of the MCG and the Cordner Entrance, named in honour of former MCC President, Melbourne Football Club Premiership Captain and Brownlow Medallist Don Cordner.

== Club traditions ==
=== Club colours ===
Melbourne Cricket Club Blazer held by the Australian Sports Museum.

The club colours of red, white and blue were chosen in 1851 ahead of its intercolonial match against Van Diemen's Land in Launceston. In 1864, the MCC committee formally resolved that the club uniform would consist of white flannel clothing accompanied by a ribbon and belt in red, white and blue. The colours and most visibly expressed through the MCC crest, club tie, members’ accessories and the distinctive MCC blazer. The blazer is famously worn by the MCG tour guides, all of whom are MCC Members.

=== The Long Room ===
The Long Room is a traditional members' room within the MCC Members' Reserve. Its predecessor formed part of the Members' Pavilion opened in 1928, where the space was originally divided between the Members' Lounge and Members' Dining Room. The two areas were renamed the Long Room in 1958.

The original Long Room was demolished with the Members' Pavilion in 2003 during redevelopment of the northern side of the MCG. A new Long Room was incorporated into the rebuilt Members' Reserve and opened in 2005. Its design retained elements of its predecessor, including portraits of former club officeholders, leather furnishings and MCC insignia. The foundation stone of the club's second Members' Pavilion is also displayed in the room. Access to the Long Room is subject to MCC membership and visitor regulations and a formal dress code applies.

=== Dress codes ===
The MCC has long maintained dress standards for members and visitors using the Members' Reserve. While general reserve areas require neat casual attire, more formal spaces, including the Long Room and Members' Dining Room, have traditionally required jackets, collared shirts and ties for men and equivalent formal dress for women.

== Governance ==
The MCC is a body corporate incorporated under its own Act of the Victorian Parliament, Melbourne Cricket Club Act 1974 (Vic). Its affairs are overseen by the MCC Committee, which is elected from the club's membership and comprises a president, vice-presidents, a treasurer and other committee members. The committee is responsible for the club's strategic direction, financial oversight and governance, while day-to-day operations are delegated to the chief executive and management team.

Full members elect committee members and consider club business at the Annual General Meeting, including the club's annual report and financial statements. The committee is supported by a number of subcommittees covering areas including finance, audit and risk, cricket, nominations and remuneration.

== Cricket team ==
The MCC has been active in club cricket in Victoria since its inception. The club was one of the strongest in pennant cricket during the pre-district era (1889–90 to 1905–06). When district cricket commenced in 1906–07, the club initially opted out; and while it continued to play club matches, it was not eligible for the district pennant. The club agreed to join the district scheme starting from the 1914–15 season, under special rules whereby it could draw players from any district but with a limit on how many could be drawn from any single other club's district.

The MCC plays its First XI matches at the Albert Cricket Ground. It has been the most successful club in Victorian District/Premier Cricket, and as of 2023–24 has won an association-high 22 First XI two-day premierships:
First XI Two-Day (22): 1914–15, 1919–20, 1929–30, 1932–33, 1934–35, 1935–36, 1936–37, 1937–38, 1948–49, 1951–52, 1958–59, 1972–73, 1975–76, 1981–82, 1988–89, 1992–93, 1994–95, 1997–98, 2009–10, 2012–13, 2019–20, 2022-23
First XI One-Day/White Ball (3): 2008–09, 2012–13, 2013-14
First XI Twenty20 (2): 2007–08, 2012–13

=== Team of the century ===
In 1999, the MCC announced its cricket team of the century, with all players who had played at least one season for the club since 1906-07 being eligible for selection. All members of the team of the century except Robert Templeton had played at least one Test match for the Australian cricket team.The team as selected was:

1. Bill Ponsford
2. Colin McDonald
3. Dean Jones
4. Hunter Hendry
5. Paul Sheahan
6. Warwick Armstrong (Captain)
7. Hugh Trumble
8. Rob Templeton
9. Max Walker
10. Hans Ebeling
11. Bert Ironmonger
12. Vernon Ransford (12th Man)

== Sporting sections and interest groups ==
=== Sporting sections ===
The MCC operates a number of sporting sections, allowing its members to participate in organised competition across a range of sports in addition to cricket. These include Australian rules football, baseball, bowls, croquet, golf, hockey, lacrosse, real tennis, squash and tennis.

The Melbourne Football Club which competes in the Australian Football League (AFL) is the best-known sporting section. It was formally part of the MCC from 1890 to 1980 and rejoined as an affiliated sporting section in 2009.

In 2018, the club created the MCC Football Club to facilitate a women's team in the Victorian Amateur Football Association Women's (VAFAW) competition.

=== Interest groups ===
The MCC maintains several special interest groups for its members, including the Bridge Club, Long Room Wine and Food Society, Military Veterans' Group, Women of the MCC and Young Members. The XXIX Club, which plays social cricket matches in Australia and overseas, is also recognised as a special interest group. The groups organise social, recreational and cultural activities for members outside the club's formal sporting sections.

== Notable members and office holders ==
The MCC has been associated with a number of prominent figures in Australian sport, public life and administration. Notable officeholders have included long-serving presidents, trustees and administrators who played significant roles in the development of the club and the Melbourne Cricket Ground.

=== Honorary life members ===
Life membership has been bestowed sparingly and, including visiting royalty, only 86 members have been honoured since the Club's foundation in 1838.

Notable life members include George V, Edward VIII, George VI, Prince Phillip, The Duke of Edinburgh, Charles III, Hon Ivo Bligh, Prince Ranjitsinhji, Hugh Trumble, Warwick Armstrong, H. C. A. Harrison, Arthur Somers-Cocks, 6th Baron Somers, William C McClland, Albert Chadwick, Don Cordner, Percy Beames, Sir Bernard Callinan, Ian Johnson, John Cain Jr, Paul Sheahan.

=== MCC presidents ===
- Frederick Powlett, 1841–1843
- J. Stephen, 1844–1845
- G. Cavenagh, 1845–1849
- William Meek, 1849–1850
- G. Cavenagh, 1850–1852
- Thomas Hamilton, 1852–1853
- G. Cavenagh, 1853–1854
- E. P. S. Sturt, 1854–1855
- D. S. Campbell, 1855–1859
- Thomas Hamilton, 1859–1868
- David McArthur, 1868–1877
- James Francis, 1877–1880
- W.J. Clarke, 1880–1886
- Frank Grey Smith, 1886–1900
- Roderick Murchison, 1900–1907
- Leo Cussen, 1907–1933
- Edward Mitchell, 1933–1941
- Ramsay Mailer, 1941–1943
- William McClelland, 1944–1957
- Charles Simmonds, 1957–1965
- Albert Chadwick, 1965–1979
- Hans Ebeling, 1979–1980
- Bernard Callinan, 1980–1985
- Donald Cordner, 1985–1992
- John Mitchell, 1992–1997
- Bruce Church, 1997–2003
- David Jones, 2003–2007
- David Meiklejohn, 2007–2011
- Paul Sheahan, 2011–2015
- Steven Smith, 2015–2019
- Michael Happell, 2019–2023
- Fred Oldfield, 2023–present

== See also ==
- Cricket in Victoria
- Melbourne Cricket Ground
- Melbourne Football Club
- Melbourne Baseball Club
