= Essendon Baseball Club =

Baseball club

Essendon Bombers Baseball Club
- Logo

Information
- League: Baseball Victoria Summer League - Summer, Melbourne Winter Baseball League - Winter (Summer - Division 1 & 4, Winter - B grade)
- Location: Strathmore, Victoria
- Ballpark: Don Cornish Field, Boeing Reserve
- Founded: 1893
- Colors: Red & Black

Current uniforms
Current	Former

The Essendon Bombers Baseball Club is a Baseball Club based in the Melbourne suburb of Strathmore, The club formed in 1893, however a team under the Essendon name was formed with the formation of the Victorian Baseball League, it is one of the oldest continuously running Baseball Clubs in Australia.

The Club enters 6 Senior teams, 3 Women's Baseball teams, 8 junior baseball teams in the Baseball Victoria Summer League, with Masters and Tee Ball baseball too, in 2012 the club entered its first team into the Melbourne Winter Baseball League the team played in the B grade section.

== History ==
The Essendon Baseball Club was formed 1893, after a meeting at the Essendon Cricket, Bowls and Tennis Club on 24 April. For the club's entire history it has started in the highest division every year of its existence.

In 1947 Essendon and Collingwood Baseball Clubs played a series of exhibition matches in Benalla over the weekend of 20–21 September in conjunction with Benalla's Youth Week for National Fitness.

Essendon was the last Baseball Club to play Baseball Victorian Football League curtain raiser games, by 1948 the trend had moved towards reserve Football to be played before all VFL matches, The Essendon Football Club had been trying to get exclusive use of the ground with an attempt in 1935 to have School Boy Football played before their games.

1965 was a successful year. Essendon won their fourth State Premiership, defeating Melbourne 7-1 in the Grand Final, but a closer examination of the ‘entire’ Club's performances that year, reveal that 1965 was indeed a banner year in the Club's history.

In 2015, following four consecutive premierships, Essendon Baseball club was announced as winners of the “Inside Sports Magazine” Best club in Australia Award which covered all sports. They were presented this award at the Extreme Sports Expo at the Melbourne Show grounds. The prize received was a Hyundai Mini van to the value of $40,000. The club president, Tony Cornish was later interviewed on SEN, airing Sunday 22nd 2015.

Essendon Senior sides successfully defended their crown in the years 2016 & 2017 too, to make history through a "six-peat".

In the 2018/2019 summer season, the Essendon Women's Baseball firsts team took out their first State Premiership in Division 1 of the VSBL.
