= 1934 Claxton Shield =

Australia Interstate Baseball Carnival
- 1934

Tournament information
- Date: 5 – 12 August
- Host(s): (South Australia) Adelaide, SA
- Teams: 3
- Defending champions: Inaugural tournament

Final positions
- Champion: South Australia (1st title)
- 1st runner-up: New South Wales
- 2nd runner-up: Victoria

The 1934 Claxton Shield was the first annual Claxton Shield, an Australian national baseball tournament. It was held at the Adelaide Oval and Hindmarsh Oval in Adelaide from 5 to 12 August, and was won by the hosts South Australia. The other participating teams were New South Wales and Victoria.

The tournament was the first of what would be an ongoing series of regular national tournaments. Prior to 1934, there had been interstate tournaments, where one state would host only one of the others for a series of games, and there had been two national tournaments, the first in 1910 with New South Wales, Tasmania and Victoria, the second in 1912 which also included South Australia, both of which were won by New South Wales. Though the specifics of the tournament's format would change over the years, with the exception of the suspension due to World War II, the tournament would continue through to 1988 as the highest level of baseball in the country.

== Format ==
Each team met each other team twice over the course of the week. In each game, two competition points were on offer to the teams. The points were awarded as follows:

- Win – two points
- Tie – one point
- Loss – no points

At the end of the tournament, the team with the most points was declared the winner, and awarded the Claxton Shield. As there was a tie between New South Wales and Victoria for second place at the end of the tournament, their net for and against was used to split them, hence New South Wales finishing second.

== Results ==
Pos	Team	Pld	W	T	L	RF	RA	RD	Pts	(South Australia)	(New South Wales)	(Victoria (state))
1	South Australia	4	3	0	1	14	10	+4	9	—	2–1	4–2
2	New South Wales	4	1	1	2	13	13	0	4	2–0	—	6–6
3	(Victoria (state)) Victoria	4	1	1	2	18	22	−4	4	5–8	5–4	—

5 August 1934	South Australia	4 – 2	Victoria	(South Australia) Hindmarsh Oval

5 August 1934	New South Wales	2 – 0	South Australia	(South Australia) Hindmarsh Oval

7 August 1934	Victoria	5 – 4 (F/8)	New South Wales	(South Australia) Adelaide Oval

9 August 1934	New South Wales	6 – 6 (F/12)	Victoria	(South Australia) Hindmarsh Oval

12 August 1934	South Australia	2 – 1 (F/11)	New South Wales	(South Australia) Adelaide Oval

12 August 1934	Victoria	5 – 8	South Australia	(South Australia) Adelaide Oval

== Bibliography ==
- Clark, Joe (2003). A History of Australian Baseball: Time and Game. Lincoln, NE, United States: University of Nebraska Press. ISBN 0-8032-6440-2.
- Harris, John O. (2009). Baseball Queensland 1905-1990. Archived from the original on 6 July 2011.
