= Melbourne Baseball Club =

Melbourne Demons (MCC)
- [[File: |frameless|class=pageimage|alt=]] Logo

Information
- League: Baseball Victoria Summer League - Summer (Division 1)
- Location: Boxhill, Victoria
- Ballpark: Surrey Park, Box Hill
- Founded: 1888
- League championships: Division 1 - 1890, 1893, 1894, 1904, 1905, 1907, 1908, 1909, 1910, 1911, 1912, 1913, 1916, 1919, 1920, 1932, 1935, 1942, 1943, 1945, 1946, 1967, 1969, 1971 Division 2 - 1958, 1987/88, 2000/01, 2010/11
- Former ballpark(s): M.C.G., Albert Cricket Ground, Myrtle Park Nth Balwyn
- Colors
- Website: mccbaseball.org.au

Current uniforms
Current	Alternative

The Melbourne Baseball Club, nicknamed the Demons, is a baseball club based in the inner Melbourne suburb of Box Hill. The club is the baseball section affiliated with the Melbourne Cricket Club (MCC).

Having been established as the baseball section of the MCC in 1888, it is one of the oldest baseball clubs in Australia.

== History ==
The club had been involved in baseball since 1857, when a group of cricket enthusiasts played a game held in the Carlton Gardens. By the 1860s S.P. Lord led several attempts to organise baseball in Melbourne, although the game never progressed beyond games in the Carlton Gardens.

The 1876 Philadelphia Centennial Exhibition showed that the United States was on the road to become an economic world power and baseball could be a crucial link between the US and the new colony. From then on, American influence became more pronounced. The Melbourne International Exhibition (1880) caught the attention of several foreign observers who realised that Melbourne looked like an "American-style" city.

In October 1885, members of the Melbourne Cricket Club played the officers of the US Enterprise which were the first ever played at the Melbourne Cricket Ground. The American won 23–17 but they could watch the progress of the Australians in the sport. To commemorate the United States Declaration of Independence in 1887, the American Baseball Club established in Melbourne played a team captained by H.F. Boyle of the MCC, being defeated.

The MCC committee continued to support the expansion of local interest in baseball. In 1888 they resolved to form a team and arrange exhibition games as a preparation for a visit to the US. The MCC played the MBC who were American expatriated mostly. The game, played in Albert Park, saw MCC to win 35–29.

The scores were tolerably even until Bruce, of the Melbourne took the position of thrower, and Cotter went behind the striker. Bruce performed the equivalent of the “hat trick” in cricket, or, in other words, he put their opponents out before they had even scored a base. Their catching gave the cricketers a decided advantage, but their opponents could handle the bat with more telling effect.

— The Argus, 5 July 1888

The matches against the resident Americans became a regular practise during those times.

On 23 December 1888, Melbourne played a four-inning game against the Chicago White Stockings of the American National League, visiting Australia as part of the Spalding World Tour, before a crowd of 12,000; cricketer William Bruce was pitcher for the Melbourne side, who was reported to have "very good form for a novice."

== See also ==
- Melbourne Cricket Club
