= 1937 Claxton Shield =

Australia Interstate Baseball Carnival
- 1937

Tournament information
- Date: 7 – 14 August
- Host(s): (South Australia) Adelaide, SA
- Teams: 4
- Defending champions: South Australia

Final positions
- Champion: New South Wales (1st title)
- 1st runner-up: Victoria
- 2nd runner-up: South Australia

The 1937 Claxton Shield was the fourth annual Claxton Shield, an Australian national baseball tournament. It was held at Unley Oval in Adelaide from 7 to 14 August, the second time Adelaide had hosted the Shield. New South Wales won the Shield for the first time. Western Australia joined the tournament for the first time, becoming the fourth state to be represented. The other participating teams were Victoria and hosts South Australia.

== Format ==
With the introduction of a fourth team to the tournament, changes were made to the format used in the three previous years. The four teams played a round-robin schedule, meeting each other team once, with two competition points were on offer in each game. The points were awarded as follows:

- Win – two points
- Tie – one point
- Loss – no points

At the end of these preliminary games, the top two teams played each other to determine the champions, while the remaining two teams faced each other to determine third place.

In the event of a tie between teams in terms of points, the tiebreaker used would have been the net runs for and against, with the team achieving the greater value placing in the higher position. This became a factor in the final preliminary game, between South Australia and Victoria. If South Australia had won, they would have tied with New South Wales and Victoria on points. Given the previous results in the tournament, South Australia needed to win by four or more runs to overtake Victoria on for and against, and therefore meet New South Wales in the championship game. Leading 1–0 in the bottom of the ninth inning, South Australia intentionally allowed Victoria to score a run to tie the game, and force extra innings. The plan failed though, as neither team was able to score any further runs, and the game was called after 14 innings because of the light. As a result, Victoria and New South Wales contested the final.

== Results ==
=== Preliminaries ===
Team	Points	Wins	Ties	Losses	For-Against
Victoria	5	2	1	–	+4
New South Wales	4	2	–	1	+7
South Australia	3	1	1	1	-3
Western Australia	0	–	–	3	-8

7 August 1936	Western Australia	2 – 5	Victoria	(South Australia) Unley Oval

7 August 1936	New South Wales	6 – 0	South Australia	(South Australia) Unley Oval

10 August 1936	Western Australia	0 – 3	South Australia	(South Australia) Unley Oval

10 August 1936	New South Wales	1 – 2	Victoria	(South Australia) Unley Oval

12 August 1936	Western Australia	0 – 2	New South Wales	(South Australia) Unley Oval

12 August 1936	Victoria	1 – 1 (F/14)	South Australia	(South Australia) Unley Oval

=== Finals ===
==== Third place final ====
14 August 1936	Western Australia	0 – 2	South Australia	(South Australia) Unley Oval

==== Championship game ====
14 August 1936	New South Wales	4 – 1	Victoria	(South Australia) Unley Oval

1937 Claxton Shield Champions

New South Wales
1st title

== Bibliography ==
- Clark, Joe (2003). A History of Australian Baseball: Time and Game. Lincoln, Nebraska: University of Nebraska Press. ISBN 0-8032-6440-2.
- Harris, John O. (2009). Baseball Queensland 1905–1990. Archived from the original on 6 July 2011.
