= Baseball Victoria =

Australian governing body for baseball

- Sport: Baseball
- Jurisdiction: Victoria
- Abbreviation: BVIC
- Founded: 1890; 135 years ago
- Affiliation: World Baseball Softball Confederation
- Regional affiliation: Baseball Confederation of Oceania
- Headquarters: Altona Meadows, Victoria
- President: Andy Rose
- Chairman: David Hynes
- CEO: Chet Gray
- Men's coach: Dave Nilsson
- Women's coach: Jason Pospishil

Official website
- baseballvictoria.com.au
- (Victoria (state))

Baseball Victoria is the governing body of baseball within Victoria. Baseball Victoria is governed by the Australian Baseball Federation.

The body has teams competing in four divisions.

== Early history ==
The Victorian Baseball League (VBL) was constituted in 1890 by J.C. Williamson, Harry Rickards, Harry Musgrove, J.S. Milford and Major Ben Wardill (the longtime secretary of the Melbourne Cricket Club). J. C. Williamson was the first President and remained in office for six years.

The teams in the inaugural season of the Victorian Baseball League were: Carlton, Ferguson & Mitchell, Fitzroy, Geelong, Kew, M.C.C., Melbourne (to be renamed Metropolitans), Richmond, Richmond C.C., St.Kilda, the "Age" and Victoria.

They were followed by South Melbourne, East Melbourne and Malvern in 1893, Essendon in 1893, Hawkesburn in 1896, and Prahran in 1897.

== Victorian Baseball Union split ==
Since before the First World War Baseball curtain-raisers to League football had been an institution. The Victorian Baseball League A-grade competition fixture was aligned with the Victorian Football Association fixture and under this system every A grade team also had the backing of a District Cricket Club with all of the resultant benefits.

In 1896 football in Victoria was split into two sections when eight of the thirteen Victorian Football Association (VFA) clubs (Carlton, Collingwood, Essendon, Fitzroy, Geelong, Melbourne, St Kilda and South Melbourne) broke away to form the Victorian Football League (VFL). This league soon became the dominant of the two especially given all twenty Victorian Football Association premierships to that stage had been shared by six of those eight clubs. The VFA continued to be an independent body, with only five of its original clubs (Footscray, North Melbourne, Port Melbourne, Richmond and Williamstown) – but within five years it had expanded to ten clubs, a size it maintained until the 1920s. This split had a significant impact on Victorian Baseball.

For several years after football split the Victorian Baseball League debated the need to restructure its constitution to recognize the split between the VFA and VFL. At each annual meeting of the VBL a portion of the business was dedicated to the allocation of teams between A and B grades, following a basic relegation and promotion system. In 1915 this meant that A Grade consisted of six teams playing on league football grounds and four on Association grounds. This caused it to be near impossible to organize a fair fixture of home and away matches matching teams with their respective football club. Further exacerbating the problem was that the VFL played on better grounds to larger crowds.

At a special meeting of the Victoria Baseball League on 25 March 1915 the executive committee submitted a proposition to split the league into one division of "League" clubs and one of "Association" clubs. Each section was to compete for its own pennant, the winners to play one game at the end of the season to decide the championship and the right to hold the Frank Laver shield. However a sufficient majority to pass the changes to the constitution was not secured.

A Grade delegates contended that they had little voice in the management of the League, being frequently out-voted by the B and C grade delegates. With a feeling of certainty that baseball affairs in Victoria were not controlled by the administrative officers and responsible clubs, the seceding clubs unanimously agreed that there was only one step to take. The Victorian Baseball Union was formed by Fitzroy, East Melbourne, Melbourne, South Melbourne, Carlton, Richmond, St Kilda and Collingwood. The Union included every major office holder of the Victorian Baseball League (with the exception of one member of the executive committee).

In 1925 the League and the Union settled their differences and amalgamated into the Victorian Baseball Association (VBA) under the Presidency of Len Johnston.

== Victorian Baseball after Football ==
Baseball curtain-raisers were discontinued in 1947 when the introduction of the VFL third eighteen eliminated baseball from League football grounds. This did allow the Victorian Baseball Association to reintroduce promotion and relegation independent of football to the competition.

In 1960 the VBA amalgamated A and B grades together and formed North and South division. In 1963 however, the VBA reverted to the old A and B grade system.

In August 1976 the Victorian Baseball Association made the major decision to change the season for the main competition to summer. This is the time of year in which the sport is played in the two major countries of America and Japan. Furthermore, all other Australian states were playing during summer and this put Victoria at a considerable disadvantage for the Australian Championships (the Claxton Shield).

== Recent history ==
In 2006, the Victorian Baseball Association (VBA) and the Victorian Provincial Baseball League (VPBL) entered into a Memorandum of Understanding (MOU). The MOU was an attempt to clear the situation of having two governing bodies for baseball in Victoria. The VPBL was made of affiliated associations, predominantly based in regional centres, which scheduled competitions in the winter months (i.e. April - September). The VBA was predominantly based around the metropolitan suburbs of Melbourne and played their matches in the summer months (i.e. October - March). The VBA and the VPBL both have strong histories and heritage.

The unification process was further galvanised in 2009 by the establishment of a new Constitution and independent Board of Directors to run a single governing body for Victorian baseball, to be known as Baseball Victoria. It was hoped that the unification process would guarantee the growth and management of baseball in Victoria. The conduct, and therefore costs associated with the previous VPBL competitions remained the jurisdiction of the various associations.

Features of a unified model would be the full establishment of statewide programs, operating in all areas of Melbourne and Country Victoria and working with all clubs regardless of historical ties to VBA or VPBL.

Baseball Victoria is responsible for selecting the Victoria Aces team that competed in the Claxton Shield; an annual, national baseball competition currently contested between the five mainland states of Australia. Baseball Victoria also governs all levels of baseball in the state, and directly runs the State Summer League (renamed the Baseball Victoria Summer League in 2010), considered to be the top level of competition in the state and the source of the majority of Australian-based players selected for the Victoria Aces.

== Victorian Baseball Today ==
Baseball in Victoria is played all year round with two seasons - Summer and Winter.

=== Summer Baseball in Victoria ===
Summer Baseball is conducted between October and March. The Baseball Victoria Summer League (BVSL) has the direct authority over the competitions conducted within the summer season, with Baseball Victoria providing umbrella support. Competition matches are generally played within the metropolitan areas of Melbourne.

==== Baseball Victoria Summer League ====
The Baseball Victoria Summer League was formed in 2010 by Baseball Victoria and replaced the former Victorian State League and the Vodafone State League. Baseball Victoria rebranded the competition to comprise mainstream men's, women's, junior and Masters competitions.

=== Winter Baseball in Victoria ===
Winter Baseball is conducted between April and September. Regionally based Associations have the direct authority over the competitions conducted within the winter season, with Baseball Victoria providing umbrella support to other baseball activities, such as development and high performance programs.

Victorian Baseball during the winter is played across eight Leagues and Associations. Each League and Association is responsible for the competitions within their local areas.

Affiliated Winter Competitions
Ballarat Baseball Association	Bendigo Baseball Association
Dandenong Baseball Association	Geelong Baseball Association
Latrobe Valley Baseball Association	Melbourne Winter Baseball League
North Eastern Baseball Association	Sunraysia Baseball League

Baseball Victoria also stage the State Winter Championships which matches representative teams from each League and Association. While being competitive is a high priority, it is just as important to have fun and enjoy a weekend of baseball in a relaxed environment.

==== Melbourne Winter Baseball League ====
The Melbourne Winter Baseball League, formerly the Victorian Winter Baseball League, is the biggest winter baseball league in Victoria. It is run by Baseball Victoria as of 2010 after it took control from the VPBL after a Memorandum of Understanding. There are 25 different clubs, fielding teams in five grades from A to E. Every Grade has a reserves as well.

The Melbourne Winter Baseball League is made up from two leagues. One being the Ringwood District Baseball League and the other, Diamond Valley Baseball League. This is more important for juniors as junior teams only play teams in their own district. Except for under 17s where both districts play each other. At the state winter championships these two districts play against each other

==== Geelong Winter Baseball League ====
The Geelong Winter League, is run by the Geelong Baseball Association (GBA) and based in Geelong, Victoria. The GBA is affiliated with Baseball Victoria.

Established in 1937, the GBA offers senior and junior competitions to clubs and teams from metropolitan Geelong, Colac, Werribee, Bacchus Marsh, Lara, Newport and Ballarat. Competition is conducted from early April through to September.
