= Baseball Australia =

National governing body of baseball in Australia

- Sport: Baseball
- Jurisdiction: Australia
- Abbreviation: BA
- Affiliation: World Baseball Softball Confederation
- Regional affiliation: Baseball Confederation of Oceania
- Headquarters: Sydney, New South Wales
- Chairman: David Hynes
- CEO: Glenn Williams
- Men's coach: Dave Nilsson
- Women's coach: Jason Pospishil
- (Australia)

Baseball Australia, formerly the Australian Baseball Federation is the national governing body of Baseball in Australia and owns the Australian Baseball League.

Baseball is played in all the mainland states and territories, but it struggles for popularity due to the popularity of many other sports, including the comparable sport of cricket, in which Australia has always been one of the leading nations. School-aged children are generally guided toward a future in cricket, rather than baseball, especially in the private schooling system.

Baseball Australia were previously 25% stakeholders along with Major League Baseball of the ABL when it began play in November 2010. Following the 2015–16 Australian Baseball League season, MLB decided to relinquish its 75% share in the League, with Baseball Australia becoming the sole owner.

Since Australia's silver medal performance at the 2004 Athens Olympics the participation rate in most of the eastern states has remained stable, however, there has been a large increase in the sport's popularity and participation in Western Australia.

In 2003, within Australia there was roughly 57,000 Australians playing baseball in around 5000 teams.

The most notable Australian-born baseball players include Dave Nilsson and Graeme Lloyd.

== See also ==
- Baseball in Australia
