= 2010 Claxton Shield =

Baseball competition

- The logo for the 2010 Claxton Shield
- Sport: Baseball
- Defending champions: Perth Heat (2009)
- Duration: 6 November 2009 – 7 February 2010
- Teams: 5

Regular season
- Season champions: Victoria Aces (17–7)
- Second place: South Australia (14–10)
- Third place: New South Wales Patriots (14–10)

Championship series
- Champions: Victoria Aces (22nd title)
- Runners-up: South Australia

Seasons
- ← 2009

The 2010 Claxton Shield was the 76th Claxton Shield tournament, the premier baseball competition in Australia, and was held from 6 November 2009 to 7 February 2010. It was hailed as the precursor to the new Australian Baseball League that would start in the place of the Claxton Shield in late 2010 to early 2011. The Victoria Aces defeated South Australia two games to nil in the championship series to win the tournament; this was the 22nd time the Claxton Shield had been awarded to a Victorian team. The competition was sponsored by Domino's Pizza.

At the conclusion of the regular season, the Victoria Aces finished in first place with a 17–7 record, earning home-field advantage for the three-game championship series. South Australia hosted the three-game semi-final series against the New South Wales Patriots. Both teams finished with a 14–10 record. The Perth Heat (12–12) and Queensland Rams (3–21) both failed to qualify for the finals.

== Overview ==
In June 2009, it was announced that the rights to the Claxton Shield had been sold to a new Australian Baseball League (ABL), with ownership split between Major League Baseball's 75 percent share and the 25 percent share owned by the Australian Baseball Federation. The 2010 tournament was considered preparation for the inaugural ABL season starting in 2010–11. It varied from the 2009 Claxton Shield by expanding the season to include ten rounds. Since an uneven number (five) teams were involved, four teams paired off for each round and played a three-game series, while the remaining team took a bye. During the season, each team had two bye rounds and played two rounds against each other team, one at home and one away. In total, the schedule allowed for 24 regular-season games per team before a postseason similar to the 2009 edition: the first-place team directly qualified for the championship series and played against the winner of a playoff series between the second- and third-place teams.

During the regular season, games were played on a Friday night and a doubleheader on Saturday; in each doubleheader one of the two games was shortened to seven innings. The exception to this was when Perth played their home games; they played on a Thursday night instead of a doubleheader on Saturday. Each postseason series was scheduled for a Friday, Saturday and Sunday.

== Teams ==
=== Rosters ===
The 2010 series allowed each team to make use of a 19-man active roster. Exceptions were made in two cases that allowed teams' active rosters to expand to 21 players, both times for the same reason. Two games during the season had to be postponed because of poor weather. Both games involved teams meeting for the first time during the season; make-up games were scheduled at the start of the return series between the teams, and this resulted in two four-game series. In both cases, the teams had a 19-man roster for the make-up game, and an expanded 21-man roster for the originally scheduled series.

==== New South Wales Patriots ====
The New South Wales Patriots announced on 4 November 2009 both their 30–man roster and their 19–man roster for the opening series of the season.

New South Wales Patriots roster
Active roster		Inactive roster	Coaches
Pitchers Right-handed pitchers: 21 Jarrett Commane; 32 Todd Grattan; 14 Lee Ingram; 44 Wayne Lundgren; 9 Jarryd Sullivan; 26 Matthew Williams; Left-handed pitchers: 31 Craig Anderson; 10 Tim Cox; 19 Matthew Rae	Catchers: 23 Andrew Graham; 20 Patrick Maat; Infielders: 24 Mark Holland; 16 Michael Lysaught; Outfielders: 30 Tim Atherton; 33 Tim Auty; 17 Mitch Dening; 25 David Kandilas; Utility players: 11 Trent D'Antonio; 6 Jason Pospishil	-- Alessio Angelucci; 3 Scott Dalgairns; 36 Josh Dean; 43 Josh Freeman; 37 Vaughn Harris; 22 Alex Johnson; 42 Boss Moanaroa; 12 Shannon Pender; 2 Trent Schmutter; 28 Aaron Sookee; 5 Tim Stanford; 39 Bradley Tippett; 29 Mark Trau; 35 Todd Van Steensel	Manager: 18 Glenn Williams; Coaches: 15 Gary White (assistant coach); 7 Graham Cassel (assistant coach); 31 Chris Oxspring (pitching coach); Other Staff: Eddie Bray (Executive Officer)
Correct as of 31 January 2010

==== Queensland Rams ====
Queensland Rams roster
Active roster		Inactive roster	Coaches
Pitchers Right-handed pitchers: 41 James Albury; 45 Justin Erasmus; 5 Brett Montgomery; 48 Simon Morriss; 37 Drew Naylor; 44 Aaron Thompson; 29 Matthew Timms; Left-handed pitchers: 11 Chris Lamb; 21 Rodney Wodson	Catchers: 25 Joel Naughton; 18 Mitch Nilsson; Infielders: 31 Andrew Campbell; 24 Brad Dutton; 15 Daniel Lamb-Hunt; 8 Alan Schoenberger; Outfielders: 6 Joel McInnes; Utility players: 52 Ryan Battaglia; 20 Andrew Utting; 13 Shayne Watson	42 Trent Baker; -- PJ Bevis; 35 Jarrod Bruce; 27 Nathan Crawford; -- Tristan Crawford; -- Wade Dutton; -- Todd Fairbrother; 46 Aven Fletcher; -- Stephen Greer; -- James Linger; -- Jay Nilsson; -- Carlos Prichard; -- Rory Rhodes; -- Ryan Searle; -- Phil Stockman; -- Logan Wade; 9 Luke White	Manager: 14 Dave Nilsson; Coaches: 17 Peter Gahan (assistant coach); 7 Brett Ward (assistant coach); 19 Gary Nilsson (pitching coach); Other Staff: Robert Moden (Executive Officer); Chris Beaton (physiotherapist)
Correct as of 24 January 2010

==== Perth Heat ====
Perth Heat roster
Active roster		Inactive roster	Coaches
Pitchers Right-handed pitchers: 17 Benn Grice; 32 Mark Kelly; 35 Scott Mitchinson; 22 Dylan Peacock; 30 Warwick Saupold; 21 Brendan Wise; Left-handed pitchers: 26 Daniel Schmidt; 33 Terrence Wohlever	Catchers: 11 Allan de San Miguel; 9 Chris House; Infielders: 34 Dallas Christison; 2 Mitch Graham; 16 Luke Hughes; 4 Andrew Kyle; Outfielders: 38 Brandon Dale; 10 Nick Kimpton; Utility players: 19 Matthew Kennelly; 23 Timothy Kennelly; 14 Dean White	1 Corey Adamson; 40 Robin Adamson; 21 Lachlan Dale; 29 Nathan Driessen; 20 Jesse Barron; 18 Liam Hendriks; 12 Liam Hopkins; 31 Bryant Kraus; -- Cameron Lamb; -- Richard Michell; 7 Todd Murphy; -- Travis Murphy; 27 Aaron Ottoway; -- Ben Risinger; -- Graeme Scorer; 6 Jason Smit	Manager: 5 Don Kyle; Coaches: 40 Greg Jelks (assistant coach); 37 Graeme Lloyd (assistant coach); 28 Steven Kirkham (pitching coach); Other staff: Annie Italiano (physiotherapist)
Correct as of 24 January 2010

==== South Australia ====
South Australia roster
Active roster		Inactive roster	Coaches
Pitchers Right-handed pitchers: 27 Richard Bartlett; 17 Hayden Beard; 26 Darren Fidge; 62 Chris Lawson; 21 Steven O'Connor; 32 Wayne Ough; 99 Dushan Ruzic; Left-handed pitchers: 23 Paul Mildren	Catchers: 29 Michael Collins; 20 Dan Wilson; Infielders: 6 Josh Cakebread; 51 Jeremy Cresswell; 4 Scott Gladstone; 55 Ryan Murphy; 22 Stefan Welch; Outfielders: 8 Angus Roeger; 3 David Washington; 37 Ben Wigmore; Utility players: 15 Mathew Smith	-- Dylan Child; 5 Chris Doyle; -- Wilson Lee; -- Ben Lodge; 9 Jackson Lodge; 11 Ricky Meinhold; -- Brendan Pett; 18 Nick Talbot	Manager: 14 Tony Harris; Coaches: 16 Warwick Marks (pitching coach); 12 Craig Watts (assistant coach); Other Staff: David Hilterbrand (Executive Officer); Andrew Darcey (physiotherapist)
Correct as of 7 February 2010

==== Victoria Aces ====
Victoria Aces roster
Active roster		Inactive roster	Coaches
Pitchers Right-handed pitchers: 18 Matthew Blackmore; 4 Ross Hipke; 15 Shane Lindsay; 17 Russell Spear; Left-handed pitchers: 5 Elliot Biddle; 22 Adam Blackley; 11 Adam Bright; 19 Donovan Hendriks	Catchers: 16 Grant Karlsen; 24 Tristan McDonald; Infielders: 7 James Beresford; 10 Josh Davies; 23 Hayden Dingle; 12 Brad Harman; 6 Matthew Lawman; Outfielders: 3 Andrew Russell; 14 Paul Weichard; Utility players: 2 Brett Tamburrino; 9 Scott Wearne	27 Dean Barker; -- Blake Cunningham; -- Josh Davies; -- Matthew Gourlay; -- Lee Hogan; -- Justin Huber; -- Casey Jones; 13 Scott McIntyre; -- Matthew Prior; -- Tim Sullivan; 28 Greg Wiltshire	Manager: 43 Phil Dale; Coaches: 29 Phil Allen (assistant coach); 26 David Clarkson (assistant coach); Other Staff: Alicia Tang (physiotherapist)
Correct as of 7 February 2010

=== Venues ===
The 2010 Claxton Shield was contested between five teams from around Australia. In previous years, many of the teams had played their home games at multiple venues. This season each team held their home games at only one venue. There was one scheduled exception to this at the start of the season: the New South Wales Patriots' final home series against the Perth Heat was held at Gilchrist Oval, whereas all of their other home games were held at Blacktown Baseball Stadium.

As a result of poor attendance at Geelong Baseball Park, game one of the fifth-round series between New South Wales and the Victoria Aces was moved to La Trobe University, Melbourne. Although the Geelong games had attracted crowds of no more than 500, the moved game had an attendance of 2,200. Though no further regular season games were moved, the finals series hosted by the Aces was held at La Trobe University as well.

The venues are as follows:

Team	Stadium(s)	Location(s)
New South Wales Patriots	Blacktown Baseball Stadium; Gilchrist Oval	Rooty Hill (Sydney); Campbelltown (Sydney)
Perth Heat	Baseball Park	Thornlie (Perth)
Queensland Rams	Holloway Field	Newmarket (Brisbane)
South Australia	Norwood Oval	Norwood (Adelaide)
Victoria Aces	Geelong Baseball Park; La Trobe University	Grovedale (Geelong); Bundoora (Melbourne)

== Regular season ==
The regular season was held from 6 November 2009 through to 23 January 2010. All five teams competed in a double round-robin format; playing each other team in two series of three games each, totaling 24 games played each. The top three teams progressed to the finals series. The top team automatically qualified for the championship series, to face the winner of the semi-final series between the second and third placed teams.

The Queensland Rams were the first team to be eliminated from contention for the finals, after being swept four games to nil by the Victoria Aces in round 8. The following round saw South Australia clinch a position in the finals, despite finishing the round in second position. It was not until the final round that the last two spots in the finals were decided: the Aces clinched top spot by sweeping the Perth Heat, which combined with the New South Wales Patriots sweep of the Rams eliminated Perth from contention and secured the last finals spot for the Patriots.

=== Standings ===
Pos	Team	Pld	W	L	PCT	GB	Qualification
1	Victoria Aces	24	17	7	.708	—	Advance to Championship series
2	South Australia	24	14	10	.583	3	Advance to Semi-final series
3	New South Wales Patriots	24	14	10	.583	3	Advance to Semi-final series
4	Perth Heat	24	12	12	.500	5	
5	Queensland Rams	24	3	21	.125	14	

=== Round 1 ===
The New South Wales Patriots and the Victoria Aces hosted the opening round of the 2010 Claxton Shield, against the Queensland Rams and the Perth Heat respectively. New South Wales overcame a loss in their first game to take both games in the doubleheader, while Victoria had a first up win, then split their double header with Perth.

Round 1 Results

6 November 2009	Queensland Rams	4 – 3	New South Wales Patriots	(New South Wales) Blacktown Baseball Stadium, Sydney
6 November 2009	WP: Justin Erasmus (1–0); Sv: Matthew Timms (1)	Boxscore	LP: Vaughn Harris (0–1)	(New South Wales) Blacktown Baseball Stadium, Sydney

6 November 2009	Perth Heat	8 – 9	Victoria Aces	(Victoria (state)) Geelong Baseball Park, Geelong
6 November 2009	LP: Mark Kelly (0–1)	Boxscore	WP: Casey Jones (1–0)	(Victoria (state)) Geelong Baseball Park, Geelong
6 November 2009	HR: Timothy Kennelly (1)	Boxscore	HR: Hayden Dingle (1)	(Victoria (state)) Geelong Baseball Park, Geelong

7 November 2009	Queensland Rams	1 – 10	New South Wales Patriots	(New South Wales) Blacktown Baseball Stadium, Sydney
7 November 2009	LP: James Albury (0–1)	Boxscore	WP: Timothy Cox (1–0)	(New South Wales) Blacktown Baseball Stadium, Sydney

7 November 2009	Perth Heat	3 – 8	Victoria Aces	(Victoria (state)) Geelong Baseball Park, Geelong
7 November 2009	LP: Travis Murphy (0–1)	Boxscore	WP: Matthew Blackmore (1–0)	(Victoria (state)) Geelong Baseball Park, Geelong
7 November 2009	HR: Mitchell Graham (1)	Boxscore		(Victoria (state)) Geelong Baseball Park, Geelong

7 November 2009	Queensland Rams	3 – 4^{*}	New South Wales Patriots	(New South Wales) Blacktown Baseball Stadium, Sydney
7 November 2009	LP: Matthew Timms (0–1)	Boxscore	WP: Aaron Sookee (1–0)	(New South Wales) Blacktown Baseball Stadium, Sydney

7 November 2009	Perth Heat	11 – 1^{*}	Victoria Aces	(Victoria (state)) Geelong Baseball Park, Geelong
7 November 2009	WP: Dylan Peacock (1–0)	Boxscore	LP: Greg Wiltshire (0–1)	(Victoria (state)) Geelong Baseball Park, Geelong

*—Scheduled as a 7–inning game

=== Round 2 ===
The Perth Heat hosted their first series of the competition, winning their series against the New South Wales Patriots two games to one. South Australia had their first games of the season, hosting and sweeping the Queensland Rams three–nil. The second game of both series featured the first extra innings games of the season, with the respective home teams winning both matches.

As a result of their sweep, South Australia (3–0) took the outright lead of the competition, leaving Victoria (2–1) in second, New South Wales and Perth (3–3) tied, and Queensland (1–5) in last position.

Round 2 Results

12 November 2009	New South Wales Patriots	5 – 3	Perth Heat	(Western Australia) Baseball Park, Perth
12 November 2009	WP: Matthew Rae (1–0)	Boxscore	LP: Benn Grice (0–1)	(Western Australia) Baseball Park, Perth
12 November 2009	HR: Mitch Dening (1)	Boxscore		(Western Australia) Baseball Park, Perth

13 November 2009	Queensland Rams	0 – 7	South Australia	(South Australia) Norwood Oval, Adelaide
13 November 2009	LP: Simon Morriss (0–1)	Boxscore	WP: Darren Fidge (1–0)	(South Australia) Norwood Oval, Adelaide

13 November 2009	New South Wales Patriots	2 – 3 (F/11)	Perth Heat	(Western Australia) Baseball Park, Perth
13 November 2009	LP: Jarrett Commane (0–1)	Boxscore	WP: Travis Murphy (1–1)	(Western Australia) Baseball Park, Perth

14 November 2009	Queensland Rams	5 – 6 (F/8)^{*}	South Australia	(South Australia) Norwood Oval, Adelaide
14 November 2009	LP: Aaron Thompson (0–1)	Boxscore	WP: Wayne Ough (1–0)	(South Australia) Norwood Oval, Adelaide

14 November 2009	New South Wales Patriots	5 – 6	Perth Heat	(Western Australia) Baseball Park, Perth
14 November 2009	LP: Timothy Atherton (0–1)	Boxscore	WP: Benn Grice (1–1)	(Western Australia) Baseball Park, Perth

14 November 2009	Queensland Rams	0 – 9	South Australia	(South Australia) Norwood Oval, Adelaide
14 November 2009	LP: Chris Lamb (0–1)	Boxscore	WP: Richard Bartlett (1–0)	(South Australia) Norwood Oval, Adelaide
14 November 2009		Boxscore	HR: Angus Roeger (1)	(South Australia) Norwood Oval, Adelaide

*—Scheduled as a 7–inning game

=== Round 3 ===
The Queensland Rams hosted the Perth Heat, while South Australia travelled to Geelong to face the Victoria Aces. After winning the opening game, Queensland (2–7) dropped both games of the doubleheader to fall further behind the rest of the field. With Perth's (5–4) series win, they moved ahead of New South Wales (3–3) into outright third.

South Australia (4–1) and Victoria (3–2) split their series. The final game of their doubleheader suspended in the bottom of the second due to rain with South Australia leading 2–0. At the time the game administrators considered continuing the game from the point of suspension when the teams next met in Round 9, though the game was actually restarted and eventually won by South Australia.

Round 3 Results

20 November 2009	Perth Heat	1 – 8	Queensland Rams	(Queensland) Holloway Field, Brisbane
20 November 2009	LP: Mark Kelly (0–2)	Boxscore	WP: Simon Morriss (1–1)	(Queensland) Holloway Field, Brisbane
20 November 2009		Boxscore	HR: Andrew Utting 2 (2), Brad Dutton (1)	(Queensland) Holloway Field, Brisbane

20 November 2009	South Australia	6 – 4	Victoria Aces	(Victoria (state)) Geelong Baseball Park, Geelong
20 November 2009	WP: Paul Mildren (1–0); Sv: Wayne Ough (1)	Boxscore	LP: Donavon Hendricks (0–1)	(Victoria (state)) Geelong Baseball Park, Geelong

21 November 2009	Perth Heat	7 – 4^{*}	Queensland Rams	(Queensland) Holloway Field, Brisbane
21 November 2009	WP: Terrence Wohlever (1–0)	Boxscore	LP: Justin Erasmus (1–1)	(Queensland) Holloway Field, Brisbane
21 November 2009	HR: Timothy Kennelly (2), Chris House (1)	Boxscore		(Queensland) Holloway Field, Brisbane

21 November 2009	South Australia	2 – 3	Victoria Aces	(Victoria (state)) Geelong Baseball Park, Geelong
21 November 2009	LP: Darren Fidge (1–1)	Boxscore	WP: Casey Jones (2–0); Sv: Lee Hogan (1)	(Victoria (state)) Geelong Baseball Park, Geelong

21 November 2009	Perth Heat	4 – 3	Queensland Rams	(Queensland) Holloway Field, Brisbane
21 November 2009	WP: Dylan Peacock (2–0); Sv: Warwick Saupold (1)	Boxscore	LP: PJ Bevis (0–1)	(Queensland) Holloway Field, Brisbane
21 November 2009	HR: Mitchell Graham (2), Timothy Kennelly (3)	Boxscore	HR: Andrew Utting (3)	(Queensland) Holloway Field, Brisbane

21 November 2009; Game suspended – weather Replayed in Round 9	South Australia	2 – 0 (Bot 2nd)^{*}	Victoria Aces	(Victoria (state)) Geelong Baseball Park, Geelong
21 November 2009; Game suspended – weather Replayed in Round 9		Boxscore		(Victoria (state)) Geelong Baseball Park, Geelong

*—Scheduled as a 7–inning game

=== Round 4 ===
South Australia, closely followed by New South Wales, had the first games called prior to their scheduled end due to a mercy rule. South Australia's 10–run win helped to set up their series win against Queensland in Brisbane, while the Patriot's 13–run win over Victoria snapped a 3–game losing streak and was the significant part of the 20 runs they scored in the two games for the day.

South Australia (6–2) extended their tournament lead to a game and a half over New South Wales and Perth (5–4), once again tied. Victoria (4–4) fell to fourth, while Queensland (3–9) remained in last.

Round 4 Results

27 November 2009	Victoria Aces	6 – 3	New South Wales Patriots	(New South Wales) Blacktown Baseball Stadium, Sydney
27 November 2009	WP: Casey Jones (3–0); Sv: Matthew Blackmore (1)	Boxscore	LP: Todd Grattan (0–1)	(New South Wales) Blacktown Baseball Stadium, Sydney

27 November 2009	South Australia	15 – 5 (F/7)	Queensland Rams	(Queensland) Holloway Field, Brisbane
27 November 2009	WP: Paul Mildren (2–0); Sv: Hayden Beard (1)	Boxscore	LP: Simon Morriss (1–2)	(Queensland) Holloway Field, Brisbane
27 November 2009	HR: Dan Wilson (1), Stefan Welch (1), Ben Wigmore (1), Michael Collins (1)	Boxscore	HR: Joel Naughton (1)	(Queensland) Holloway Field, Brisbane

28 November 2009	Victoria Aces	5 – 18 (F/7)	New South Wales Patriots	(New South Wales) Blacktown Baseball Stadium, Sydney
28 November 2009	LP: Donavon Hendricks (0–2)	Boxscore	WP: Timothy Cox (2–0)	(New South Wales) Blacktown Baseball Stadium, Sydney
28 November 2009	HR: Grant Karlsen (1)	Boxscore	HR: Andrew Graham (1), Mitch Dening (2)	(New South Wales) Blacktown Baseball Stadium, Sydney

28 November 2009	South Australia	3 – 2^{*}	Queensland Rams	(Queensland) Holloway Field, Brisbane
28 November 2009	WP: Dushan Ruzic (1–0); Sv: Wayne Ough (2)	Boxscore	LP: PJ Bevis (0–2)	(Queensland) Holloway Field, Brisbane
28 November 2009	HR: Michael Collins (2)	Boxscore	HR: Alan Schoenberger (1)	(Queensland) Holloway Field, Brisbane

28 November 2009	Victoria Aces	1 – 2^{*}	New South Wales Patriots	(New South Wales) Blacktown Baseball Stadium, Sydney
28 November 2009	LP: Dean Barker (0–1)	Boxscore	WP: Wayne Lundgren (1–0); Sv: Matthew Rae (1)	(New South Wales) Blacktown Baseball Stadium, Sydney

28 November 2009	South Australia	7 – 9 (F/8)	Queensland Rams	(Queensland) Holloway Field, Brisbane
28 November 2009	LP: Chris Lawson (0–1)	Boxscore	WP: PJ Bevis (1–2); Sv: Matthew Timms (2)	(Queensland) Holloway Field, Brisbane
28 November 2009	HR: Angus Roeger (2)	Boxscore	HR: Alan Schoenberger (2), Joel Naughton (2)	(Queensland) Holloway Field, Brisbane

*—Scheduled as a 7–inning game

=== Round 5 ===
As a result of poor attendance at Geelong Baseball Park, game one of the fifth round series between New South Wales and the Victoria was moved to La Trobe University, Melbourne. Having previously attracted crowds of no more than 500, the moved game had an attendance of 2,200, which the home team won 3–2. The series concluded in a doubleheader at Geelong, split between the two teams, giving the Aces the series win. Despite winning the series at Norwood Oval, South Australia suffered their first defeat at home, losing to Perth in the second game of the series.

At the end of the round, South Australia (8–3) held a two-game lead over Victoria (6–5). New South Wales and Perth (6–6) remained tied, having dropped to third place, while Queensland (3–9) remained in last position.

Round 5 Results

4 December 2009	Perth Heat	1 – 2	South Australia	(South Australia) Norwood Oval, Adelaide
4 December 2009	LP: Warwick Saupold (0–1)	Boxscore	WP: Hayden Beard (1–0)	(South Australia) Norwood Oval, Adelaide

4 December 2009	New South Wales Patriots	2 – 3	Victoria Aces	(Victoria (state)) La Trobe University, Melbourne
4 December 2009	LP: Aaron Sookee (1–1)	Boxscore	WP: Matthew Blackmore (2–0)	(Victoria (state)) La Trobe University, Melbourne

5 December 2009	Perth Heat	4 – 2^{*}	South Australia	(South Australia) Norwood Oval, Adelaide
5 December 2009	WP: Mark Kelly (1–2); Sv: Dean White (1)	Boxscore	LP: Darren Fidge (1–2)	(South Australia) Norwood Oval, Adelaide
5 December 2009	HR: Matthew Kennelly (1)	Boxscore	HR: Ryan Murphy (1)	(South Australia) Norwood Oval, Adelaide

5 December 2009	New South Wales Patriots	13 – 10	Victoria Aces	(Victoria (state)) Geelong Baseball Park, Geelong
5 December 2009	WP: Todd Van Steensel (1–0); Sv: Matthew Rae (2)	Boxscore	LP: Matthew Blackmore (2–1)	(Victoria (state)) Geelong Baseball Park, Geelong
5 December 2009	HR: Andrew Graham (2), Michael Lysaught (1)	Boxscore	HR: Grant Karlsen (2), Matthew Lawman (1)	(Victoria (state)) Geelong Baseball Park, Geelong

5 December 2009	Perth Heat	3 – 8	South Australia	(South Australia) Norwood Oval, Adelaide
5 December 2009	LP: Daniel Schmidt (0–1)	Boxscore	WP: Dushan Ruzic (2–0)	(South Australia) Norwood Oval, Adelaide
5 December 2009		Boxscore	HR: Matthew Smith (1)	(South Australia) Norwood Oval, Adelaide

5 December 2009	New South Wales Patriots	3 – 9^{*}	Victoria Aces	(Victoria (state)) Geelong Baseball Park, Geelong
5 December 2009	LP: Wayne Lundgren (1–1)	Boxscore	WP: Donavon Hendricks (1–2)	(Victoria (state)) Geelong Baseball Park, Geelong
5 December 2009	HR: David Kandilas (1)	Boxscore	HR: Scott Wearne (1), Paul Weichard (1)	(Victoria (state)) Geelong Baseball Park, Geelong

*—Scheduled as a 7–inning game

=== Round 6 ===
For the second time in the season, the Queensland were swept in a series this time by the Heat at Baseball Park. The Patriots hosted South Australia, and after dropping the first game won both games in the doubleheader to win the series, and inflict their first series loss of the season.

Despite their series loss, South Australia (9–5) remained in first place. Perth (9–6) moved to second place on the back of their sweep, only one half game behind. Victoria (6–5) dropped to third without playing a game. New South Wales (8–7) fell to fourth, while Queensland (3–12) remained in last place.

Round 6 Results

10 December 2009	Queensland Rams	2 – 5	Perth Heat	(Western Australia) Baseball Park, Perth
10 December 2009	LP: Justin Erasmus (1–2)	Boxscore	WP: Dylan Peacock (3–0); Sv: Warwick Saupold (2)	(Western Australia) Baseball Park, Perth
10 December 2009		Boxscore	HR: Luke Hughes (1)	(Western Australia) Baseball Park, Perth

11 December 2009	South Australia	7 – 2	New South Wales Patriots	(New South Wales) Blacktown Baseball Stadium, Sydney
11 December 2009	WP: Paul Mildren (3–0)	Boxscore	LP: Timothy Cox (2–1)	(New South Wales) Blacktown Baseball Stadium, Sydney

11 December 2009	Queensland Rams	0 – 1	Perth Heat	(Western Australia) Baseball Park, Perth
11 December 2009	LP: PJ Bevis (1–3)	Boxscore	WP: Nathan Dreissen (1–0); Sv: Benn Grice (1)	(Western Australia) Baseball Park, Perth

12 December 2009	South Australia	1 – 2 (F/9)^{*}	New South Wales Patriots	(New South Wales) Blacktown Baseball Stadium, Sydney
12 December 2009	LP: Hayden Beard (1–1)	Boxscore	WP: Matthew Rae (2–0)	(New South Wales) Blacktown Baseball Stadium, Sydney

12 December 2009	Queensland Rams	3 – 10	Perth Heat	(Western Australia) Baseball Park, Perth
12 December 2009	LP: Chris Lamb (0–2)	Boxscore	WP: Mark Kelly (2–2)	(Western Australia) Baseball Park, Perth
12 December 2009	HR: Alan Schoenberger (3)	Boxscore		(Western Australia) Baseball Park, Perth

12 December 2009	South Australia	5 – 6	New South Wales Patriots	(New South Wales) Blacktown Baseball Stadium, Sydney
12 December 2009	LP: Richard Bartlett (1–1)	Boxscore	WP: Aaron Sookee (2–1); Sv: Timothy Atherton (1)	(New South Wales) Blacktown Baseball Stadium, Sydney

*—Scheduled as a 7–inning game

=== Round 7 ===
Round 7 Results

18 December 2009	New South Wales Patriots	2 – 8	South Australia	(South Australia) Norwood Oval, Adelaide
18 December 2009	LP: Todd Grattan (0–2)	Boxscore	WP: Richard Bartlett (2–1)	(South Australia) Norwood Oval, Adelaide

18 December 2009	Victoria Aces	3 – 2 (F/12)	Queensland Rams	(Queensland) Holloway Field, Brisbane
18 December 2009	WP: Matthew Blackmore (3–1)	Boxscore	LP: Matthew Timms (0–2)	(Queensland) Holloway Field, Brisbane
18 December 2009		Boxscore	HR: Andrew Utting (4)	(Queensland) Holloway Field, Brisbane

19 December 2009	New South Wales Patriots	2 – 1^{*}	South Australia	(South Australia) Norwood Oval, Adelaide
19 December 2009	WP: Wayne Lundgren (2–1); Sv: Matthew Rae (3)	Boxscore	LP: Darren Fidge (1–3)	(South Australia) Norwood Oval, Adelaide
19 December 2009	HR: Andrew Graham (3)	Boxscore	HR: Ryan Murphy (2)	(South Australia) Norwood Oval, Adelaide

19 December 2009	Victoria Aces	5 – 2 (F/6)^{*}	Queensland Rams	(Queensland) Holloway Field, Brisbane
19 December 2009	WP: Dean Barker (1–1)	Boxscore	LP: James Albury (0–2)	(Queensland) Holloway Field, Brisbane
19 December 2009	HR: Scott Wearne (2), Andrew Russell (1)	Boxscore	HR: Andrew Utting (5)	(Queensland) Holloway Field, Brisbane

19 December 2009	New South Wales Patriots	1 – 4	South Australia	(South Australia) Norwood Oval, Adelaide
19 December 2009	LP: Jarrett Commane (0–2)	Boxscore	WP: Paul Mildren (4–0); Sv: Hayden Beard (2)	(South Australia) Norwood Oval, Adelaide

19 December 2009; Game postponed – weather Played in Round 8	Victoria Aces	–	Queensland Rams	(Queensland) Holloway Field, Brisbane

*—Scheduled as a 7–inning game

=== Round 8 ===
Round 8 Results

8 January 2010; Postponed from 19 December 2009 (Round 7)	Victoria Aces	8 – 1^{*}	Queensland Rams	(Victoria (state)) Geelong Baseball Park, Geelong
8 January 2010; Postponed from 19 December 2009 (Round 7)	WP: Adam Blackley (1–0)	Boxscore	LP: Simon Morriss (1–3)	(Victoria (state)) Geelong Baseball Park, Geelong
8 January 2010; Postponed from 19 December 2009 (Round 7)	HR: Paul Weichard (2), Brett Tamburrino (1)	Boxscore		(Victoria (state)) Geelong Baseball Park, Geelong

7 January 2010	South Australia	3 – 8	Perth Heat	(Western Australia) Baseball Park, Perth
7 January 2010	LP: Paul Mildren (4–1)	Boxscore	WP: Dylan Peacock (4–0)	(Western Australia) Baseball Park, Perth

8 January 2010	Queensland Rams	1 – 3^{*}	Victoria Aces	(Victoria (state)) Geelong Baseball Park, Geelong
8 January 2010	LP: James Albury (0–3)	Boxscore	WP: Matthew Blackmore (4–1); Sv: Russell Spear (1)	(Victoria (state)) Geelong Baseball Park, Geelong

8 January 2010	South Australia	6 – 4	Perth Heat	(Western Australia) Baseball Park, Perth
8 January 2010	WP: Richard Bartlett (3–1)	Boxscore	LP: Warwick Saupold (0–2)	(Western Australia) Baseball Park, Perth

9 January 2010	Queensland Rams	3 – 9^{*}	Victoria Aces	(Victoria (state)) Geelong Baseball Park, Geelong
9 January 2010	LP: Drew Naylor (0–1)	Boxscore	WP: Dean Barker (2–1)	(Victoria (state)) Geelong Baseball Park, Geelong
9 January 2010	HR: Daniel Lamb-Hunt (1)	Boxscore		(Victoria (state)) Geelong Baseball Park, Geelong

9 January 2010	South Australia	3 – 11	Perth Heat	(Western Australia) Baseball Park, Perth
9 January 2010	LP: Ricky Meinhold (0–1)	Boxscore	WP: Todd Murphy (1–0)	(Western Australia) Baseball Park, Perth

9 January 2010	Queensland Rams	0 – 2^{*}	Victoria Aces	(Victoria (state)) Geelong Baseball Park, Geelong
9 January 2010	LP: Justin Erasmus (1–3)	Boxscore	WP: Donavon Hendricks (2–2); Sv: Ross Hipke (1)	(Victoria (state)) Geelong Baseball Park, Geelong

*—Scheduled as a 7–inning game

=== Round 9 ===
Round 9 Results

14 January 2010; Postponed from 21 November 2009 (Round 3)	South Australia	13 – 6	Victoria Aces	(South Australia) Norwood Oval, Adelaide
14 January 2010; Postponed from 21 November 2009 (Round 3)	WP: Richard Bartlett (4–1)	Boxscore	LP: Lee Hogan (0–1)	(South Australia) Norwood Oval, Adelaide
14 January 2010; Postponed from 21 November 2009 (Round 3)	HR: Michael Collins 3 (5)	Boxscore		(South Australia) Norwood Oval, Adelaide

15 January 2010	Victoria Aces	2 – 5	South Australia	(South Australia) Norwood Oval, Adelaide
15 January 2010	LP: Adam Bright (0–1)	Boxscore	WP: Paul Mildren (5–1)	(South Australia) Norwood Oval, Adelaide
15 January 2010		Boxscore	HR: Michael Collins (6)	(South Australia) Norwood Oval, Adelaide

15 January 2010	Perth Heat	2 – 8	New South Wales Patriots	(New South Wales) Gilchrist Oval, Campbelltown
15 January 2010	LP: Dylan Peacock (4–1)	Boxscore	WP: Tim Cox (3–1); Sv: Lee Ingram (1)	(New South Wales) Gilchrist Oval, Campbelltown
15 January 2010	HR: Mitchell Graham (3), Luke Hughes (2)	Boxscore	HR: Michael Lysaught 2 (3)	(New South Wales) Gilchrist Oval, Campbelltown

16 January 2010	Victoria Aces	13 – 5^{*}	South Australia	(South Australia) Norwood Oval, Adelaide
16 January 2010	WP: Russell Spear (1–0)	Boxscore	LP: Dushan Ruzic (2–1)	(South Australia) Norwood Oval, Adelaide
16 January 2010	HR: Justin Huber (1), Brett Tamburrino (2), Grant Karlsen (3)	Boxscore	HR: Ryan Murphy (3)	(South Australia) Norwood Oval, Adelaide

16 January 2010	Perth Heat	12 – 8^{*}	New South Wales Patriots	(New South Wales) Gilchrist Oval, Campbelltown
16 January 2010	WP: Dean White (1–0)	Boxscore	LP: Matthew Williams (0–1)	(New South Wales) Gilchrist Oval, Campbelltown
16 January 2010	HR: Luke Hughes (3), Matthew Kennelly (2), Chris House (2)	Boxscore	HR: Michael Lysaught (4)	(New South Wales) Gilchrist Oval, Campbelltown

16 January 2010	Victoria Aces	8 – 3	South Australia	(South Australia) Norwood Oval, Adelaide
16 January 2010	WP: Matthew Blackmore (5–1)	Boxscore	LP: Darren Fidge (1–4)	(South Australia) Norwood Oval, Adelaide
16 January 2010	HR: Andrew Russell (2), Josh Davies (1)	Boxscore		(South Australia) Norwood Oval, Adelaide

16 January 2010	Perth Heat	7 – 11	New South Wales Patriots	(New South Wales) Gilchrist Oval, Campbelltown
16 January 2010	LP: Scott Mitchinson (0–1)	Boxscore	WP: Jarrett Commane (1–2); Sv: Lee Ingram (2)	(New South Wales) Gilchrist Oval, Campbelltown
16 January 2010	HR: Timothy Kennelly (4)	Boxscore	HR: Timothy Atherton (1)	(New South Wales) Gilchrist Oval, Campbelltown

*—Scheduled as a 7–inning game

=== Round 10 ===
Going into the final round, the Perth Heat and the Victoria Aces were the two teams that could have taken first place and assured themselves of a home final. In the first game of their series though, the Aces clinched the top spot, and in doing so made the Patriot's chance of overtaking the Heat and making the finals easier. The following two games saw New South Wales beat Queensland to move them into third position, and Perth drop another game to Victoria to allow South Australia to secure second, and a home semi final series.

The Patriots secured the last remaining finals berth in the first game of their doubleheader, beating the Rams 16–0 and eliminating the Heat from finals contention.

Round 10 Results

21 January 2010	Victoria Aces	6 – 3	Perth Heat	(Western Australia) Baseball Park, Perth
21 January 2010	WP: Donovan Hendricks (3–2)	Boxscore	LP: Scott Mitchinson (0–2)	(Western Australia) Baseball Park, Perth
21 January 2010	HR: Scott Wearne (3)	Boxscore		(Western Australia) Baseball Park, Perth

22 January 2010	New South Wales Patriots	7 – 5	Queensland Rams	(Queensland) Holloway Field, Brisbane
22 January 2010	WP: Vaughn Harris (1–1); Sv: Lee Ingram (3)	Boxscore	LP: Simon Morriss (1–4)	(Queensland) Holloway Field, Brisbane
22 January 2010		Boxscore	HR: Joel Naughton (3)	(Queensland) Holloway Field, Brisbane

22 January 2010	Victoria Aces	5 – 4	Perth Heat	(Western Australia) Baseball Park, Perth
22 January 2010	WP: Matthew Blackmore (6–1); Sv: Adam Bright (1)	Boxscore	LP: Benn Grice (1–2)	(Western Australia) Baseball Park, Perth
22 January 2010		Boxscore	HR: Brandon Dale (1), Mitchell Graham (4)	(Western Australia) Baseball Park, Perth

23 January 2010	New South Wales Patriots	16 – 0 (F/7)	Queensland Rams	(Queensland) Holloway Field, Brisbane
23 January 2010	WP: Wayne Lundgren (3–1)	Boxscore	LP: Chris Lamb (0–3)	(Queensland) Holloway Field, Brisbane
23 January 2010	HR: Trent D'Antonio (1), Patrick Maat (1), Tim Auty (1)	Boxscore		(Queensland) Holloway Field, Brisbane

23 January 2010	Victoria Aces	6 – 0	Perth Heat	(Western Australia) Baseball Park, Perth
23 January 2010	WP: Adam Blackley (2–0)	Boxscore	LP: Mark Kelly (2–3)	(Western Australia) Baseball Park, Perth
23 January 2010	HR: Elliot Biddle (1)	Boxscore		(Western Australia) Baseball Park, Perth

23 January 2010	New South Wales Patriots	5 – 1^{*}	Queensland Rams	(Queensland) Holloway Field, Brisbane
23 January 2010	WP: Jarrett Commane (2–2)	Boxscore	LP: James Albury (0–4)	(Queensland) Holloway Field, Brisbane
23 January 2010	HR: Patrick Maat (2)	Boxscore		(Queensland) Holloway Field, Brisbane

*—Scheduled as a 7–inning game

=== Statistical leaders ===
Batting leaders
Stat	Player	Total
AVG	Matthew Lawman (VIC)	.423
HR	Michael Collins (SA)	6
RBI	Timothy Kennelly (PER)	23
R	Michael Lysaught (NSW) & Scott Wearne (VIC)	21
H	Josh Davies (VIC) & Timothy Kennelly (PER)	34
SB	David Washington (SA)	12

Pitching leaders
Stat	Player	Total
W	Matthew Blackmore (VIC)	6
L	James Albury (QLD), Darren Fidge (SA) & Simon Morriss (QLD)	4
ERA	Casey Jones (VIC)	1.75
K	Timothy Cox (NSW)	46
IP	Darren Fidge (SA)	50
SV	Lee Ingram (NSW) & Matthew Rae (NSW)	3

== Finals series ==
The finals series made use of the same structure as had been used in the 2009 season. The top three teams at the conclusion of the ten rounds of regular season games qualified. The second and third placed teams faced each other in a best-of-three series hosted by the second placed team. The winner of that series then faced the first placed team for a best of three series. South Australia hosted the New South Wales Patriots at Norwood Oval, Adelaide for the semi-final series, while the Victoria Aces hosted the championship series at La Trobe University, Melbourne.

In the finals, the home team and away team alternated during each of the series. As a result, South Australia was officially the away team for game two of its series against New South Wales, as was Victoria in game two of the championship series.

South Australia came from behind in the semi-final series to win 2–1. New South Wales won game one 1–0 on the back of Timothy Auty's RBI-double, as well as Timothy Cox and Lee Ingram combining for a four-hit shutout. Despite being outhit 10–6, South Australia won game two 3–2. Unusually, the winning run was scored in the top of the ninth inning without a safe hit being recorded. Game three was won by South Australia 1–0, largely through the man of the match performance of Ryan Murphy; he pitched a complete game shutout, and scored the only run of the game on a solo home run to right field.

Despite splitting their regular season games 3–3, Victoria swept South Australia in the championship series 2–0. Despite taking an early lead in game one, South Australia was unable to hold on after allowing six runners to reach base resulting in three runs scoring in the fourth inning. Victoria held its 5–3 lead for the rest of the game through the pitching of Russell Spear and finals MVP Matthew Blackmore. In game two, South Australia led for much of the game, but a costly error by Ben Wigmore in the sixth inning, hits from Andrew Russell, Paul Weichard, James Beresford and Matthew Lawman in the ninth, and a run-free pitching performance from Ross Hipke and Russell Spear in the final three innings allowed Victoria to come from behind two nights in a row to win 7–4, and claim the states' 22nd Claxton Shield title.

=== Bracket ===
Semi-final series			Championship series
			1	Victoria Aces	2
2	South Australia	2	SF W	South Australia	0
3	New South Wales Patriots	1

=== Semi-final series ===
==== Game 1 ====
The finals series started off with a pitcher's duel: both teams were held scoreless through the first six innings, with both New South Wales' Timothy Cox and South Australia's Paul Mildren holding their opposition to only three hits in that time. But in the seventh, Patrick Maat led off the inning for the Patriots with a base hit to centre field. He then advanced to second base on Andrew Graham's sacrifice bunt, and scored on Timothy Auty's double. Cox pitched 8 innings, giving up 4 hits, 3 walks, and striking out 9 batters to pick up the win. Lee Ingram came into the game for the ninth inning to close the game, picking up a strike out while retiring three hitters in a row to get the save.

29 January 19:05 (GMT+10:30) at Norwood Oval, Adelaide
Team	1	2	3	4	5	6	7	8	9	R	H	E
New South Wales Patriots (1–0)	0	0	0	0	0	0	1	0	0	1	6	1
South Australia (0–1)	0	0	0	0	0	0	0	0	0	0	4	0
WP: Timothy Cox (1–0) LP: Paul Mildren (0–1) Sv: Lee Ingram (1); Attendance: 2,157; Boxscore

==== Game 2 ====
In another tight contest, South Australia snapped a streak of eight losing efforts in a row in finals games to New South Wales, winning 3–2. South Australia opened the scoring in the top of the fifth. Ben Wigmore and Dan Wilson hit back–to–back singles, Mathew Smith grounded out to advance both. With two out, Jason Pospishil errored on Scott Gladstone's hit to second base, allowing both runners to score.

Pospshil helped the Patriots to recover immediately in the bottom of the inning, with a single to lead off the inning. He then scored on Mark Holland's double to cut the deficit in half. In the eighth inning, New South Wales evened the game, with David Kandilas's infield hit driving in Patrick Maat. In the ninth however, South Australia regained the lead without a hit: two walks and two hit by pitches allowed Stefan Welch to score.

30 January 19:05 (GMT+10:30) at Norwood Oval, Adelaide
Team	1	2	3	4	5	6	7	8	9	R	H	E
South Australia (1–1)	0	0	0	0	2	0	0	0	1	3	6	0
New South Wales Patriots (1–1)	0	0	0	0	1	0	0	1	0	2	10	1
WP: Darren Fidge (1–0) LP: Wayne Lundgren (0–1) Sv: Hayden Beard (1); Attendance: 2,119; Boxscore

==== Game 3 ====
Like the first two games of the semi-final series, the third and deciding game was also decided by one run. Ryan Murphy was named man of the match, after pitching a two–hit shutout, and hitting a solo home run in the second inning to score the only run in the game. Prior to the game, Murphy had not started on the mound in any game in the season, and had only pitched one and a third innings in one prior appearance. Michael Lysaught almost tied the game in the third inning with a solo home run of his own. Only Dan Wilson's catch from over the fence in right field prevented it.

31 January 19:05 (GMT+10:30) at Norwood Oval, Adelaide
Team	1	2	3	4	5	6	7	8	9	R	H	E
New South Wales Patriots (1–2)	0	0	0	0	0	0	0	0	0	0	2	0
South Australia (2–1)	0	1	0	0	0	0	0	0	X	1	7	1
WP: Ryan Murphy (1–0) LP: Craig Anderson (0–1); Home runs: NSW: None; SA: Ryan Murphy (1); Attendance: 1,500; Boxscore

=== Championship series ===
==== Game 1 ====
Baseball returned to La Trobe University for the Victoria Aces' home championship series, after having just the one game there during the regular season. Unlike the semi-final series, scoring started immediately in the championship series, with South Australia scoring in the top of the first inning: Jeremy Cresswell singled and then advanced to third when Stefan Welch reached on a throwing error by catcher Grant Karlsen. Michael Collins and Ryan Murphy each walked in consecutive plate appearances, advancing Cresswell to score the first run. Before the inning could be closed out, Welch scored on a wild pitch to extend South Australia's lead to two.

Brad Harman opened the scoring for Victoria in the second inning, with a first pitch solo home run to halve the deficit. Victoria tied the game up at 2–2 through back to back doubles in the third, first from Brett Tamburrino and followed by Andrew Russell to drive Tamburrino in. South Australia briefly regained the lead in the top of the fourth inning: Ben Wigmore lead off the inning with a walk, advanced to second on Mathew Smith's single, and scored on Scott Gladstone's double.

Gladstone's RBI-double was the final pitch for Adam Blackley, having scattered 4 hits over 3 1/3 innings pitched, striking out 7 and allowing 3 runs, only 1 of which was earned. He was replaced by Matthew Blackmore, who pitched into the ninth inning, allowing only 1 hit and striking out 4 over 5 innings pitched. Neither starting pitcher pitched beyond the fourth inning, as South Australia's Paul Mildren was also replaced after 3 1/3 innings, allowing 7 hits and 5 runs (4 earned), and striking out 3.

Victoria regained the lead permanently in the bottom of the fourth, and in the process drove Mildren from the game. James Beresford led off the inning with a walk, advanced to third on Matthew Lawman's double and scored on Elliott Biddle's single. Scott Wearne reached second on a throwing error by second baseman Smith, which also allowed Lawman to score. Tamburrino received a walk, followed by Russell being hit by a pitch which forced Biddle to score. The hit batter resulted in Chris Lawson replacing Mildren on the mound. Like the other relievers in the game, Lawson did not allow a run to score over his 2 2/3 innings pitched. The 5–3 score at the end of the fourth inning would be maintained for the rest of the game. Russell Spear entered the game in the ninth inning to close the game for Victoria, earning the save. Blackmore was credited with the win, while Mildren was charged with the loss for South Australia.

5 February 19:35 (GMT+11) at La Trobe University, Melbourne
Team	1	2	3	4	5	6	7	8	9	R	H	E
South Australia (0–1)	2	0	0	1	0	0	0	0	0	3	5	2
Victoria Aces (1–0)	0	1	1	3	0	0	0	0	X	5	7	2
WP: Matthew Blackmore (1–0) LP: Paul Mildren (0–1) Sv: Russell Spear (1); Home runs: SA: None; VIC: Brad Harman (1); Boxscore

==== Game 2 ====
The second game of the series started in even fashion: both sides were retired in order in the first inning, and each got runners into scoring position without actually scoring in the second. The games' first run came in the third inning, and for the fourth time in the 2010 postseason a run was driven in by a walk. Tristan McDonald led off the inning with a single to center field. He advanced to second on Brett Tamburrino's single to right field, to third when Andrew Russell was hit by a pitch, then scored when Paul Weichard drew a walk. South Australia tied the score again in the fourth inning. Ben Wigmore walked to lead off the inning, and advanced to second when Dan Wilson ground out to first base. Wigmore then scored on Mathew Smith's single.

Victoria immediately regained the lead in the top of the fifth inning. Tamburrino singled, and then advanced to third on Russell's own base hit. Weichard hit a deep fly ball to center field, allowing Tamburrino to score on the sacrifice fly. However South Australia took the lead for the first time in the game in the bottom of the inning, when Shane Lindsay—pitching in relief of Adam Bright, who'd struck out 5 and allowed 5 hits, 1 walk and 1 run over 4 innings pitched—walked David Washington and Jeremy Cresswell, before giving up a home run to Michael Collins to take the score to 4–2. After the home run Lindsay, Ross Hipke and Russell Spear would combine to keep South Australia from scoring again in the game.

That lead was halved in the sixth through an unearned run. Elliot Biddle got on through an infield hit, and then advanced to third when Ben Wigmore dropped a fly ball in center field off the bat of Hayden Dingle. This allowed Tristan McDonald to drive Wigmore in on a sacrifice fly. Richard Bartlett entered the game to pitch for South Australia in the seventh inning, but was unable to hold on to the one-run lead he was given, allowing the tying run to score in the eighth when he walked McDonald and gave up an RBI-double to Scott Wearne.

James Beresford drove in the go-ahead run in the top of the ninth inning in the form of Paul Weichard after he and Andrew Russell hit back to back infield singles. Hayden Beard was brought in by South Australia to try to stop the flow of runs, but gave up a two run-double to Matthew Lawman to take Victoria to a 7–4 lead. Russell Spear entered the game for Victoria as closer for the second night in a row, and despite giving up two hits was able to keep South Australia scoreless to earn a second save.

6 February 19:35 (GMT+11) at La Trobe University, Melbourne
Team	1	2	3	4	5	6	7	8	9	R	H	E
Victoria Aces (2–0)	0	0	1	0	1	1	0	1	3	7	13	1
South Australia (0–2)	0	0	0	1	3	0	0	0	0	4	8	2
WP: Ross Hipke (1–0) LP: Richard Bartlett (0–1) Sv: Russell Spear (2); Home runs: VIC: None; SA: Michael Collins (1); Boxscore

== Awards ==
At the conclusion of the finals series, the winner of two awards were announced. Matthew Blackmore won both the Pitcher of the Year award and the Finals Series MVP award. At the Baseball Australia Diamond Awards, held on 6 March at the Hotel Grand Chancellor, Adelaide, Wayne Lundgren was announced as the 35th winner of the Helms Award; the Claxton Shield's Most Valuable Player award. Lundgren was the first pitcher to win since 1986. Runners-up by two votes were Paul Mildren and Michael Collins.
