= Wayne Lundgren =

Australian professional baseball pitcher (born 1982)

- Pitcher
- Born: 21 April 1982 (age 44); Thornleigh, New South Wales, Australia
- Bats: Right Throws: Right
- Stats at Baseball Reference

Wayne Leslie Lundgren (born 21 April 1982) is an Australian former professional baseball pitcher. He has previously played for the Brockton Rox of the Can-Am League and the Sydney Blue Sox of the Australian Baseball League (ABL).

== Professional career ==
Lundgren was signed by Jon Deeble and debuted as a professional in 2000 with GCL Red Sox, recording 2–2 with a save and a 3.41 ERA. He then pitched in the International Baseball League of Australia for the off-season in 2000–2001, going 2–3 with a 4.50 ERA. In 2001, he had a 4–2, 2 Sv record for the GCL Red Sox. Wayne did not pitch in 2002 due to injury, then split 2003 between the Lowell Spinners and Augusta GreenJackets before being released from the Red Sox organisation.

In 2004, he was then picked up as a free agent by the St. Louis Cardinals and pitched that year for the Peoria Chiefs (2–2, 3.94) and Palm Beach Cardinals (0–1, 4.26). He was promoted and spent 2005 with the Swing of the Quad Cities (1–0, 8.76) and Palm Beach (3–3, 4.15).

Lundgren debuted and pitched for the Australia national baseball team in the 2006 World Baseball Classic. In the 5th against the Dominican Republic national baseball team, he replaced Paul Mildren with a 5–1 deficit. He retired Ronnie Belliard, Wily Mo Pena and Alberto Castillo in order. After Australia made it 5–2, Lundgren opened the bottom of the 6th by hitting Willy Taveras. Taveras stole second and moved to third on a ground out by Alfonso Soriano. Wayne retired Albert Pujols and continued his fine run against the MLB stars by retiring Miguel Tejada on a fly to right. Matty Gahan relieved him in the 7th.

In 2006, Wayne moved to the Cincinnati Reds chain and pitched for the Sarasota Reds (0–2, 7.62) and Dayton Dragons (2–1, Sv, 2.60). After one year in Japan, he went 11–3 with a 3.28 for the Brockton Rox of the Can-Am League, finishing 6th in the league for ERA.

Lundgren's pitching in the 2009 Claxton Shield earned him a spot on Australia's provisional roster for the 2009 World Baseball Classic, though he did not make the final cut. He was with the Rox for 2009 and as of 10 August, was 6–5 with a 2.39 ERA.

The 2010 Claxton Shield proved to be even more successful for Lundgren as he won the tournament MVP, known as the prestigious Helms Award, becoming the first pitcher to do so since 1986. With 8 starts for the NSW Patriots, he finished the year with a 3–1 record and tidy 3.02 ERA. This included six quality starts, in which he conceded just 3 runs over 33.1 innings while striking out 28 and walking just 3 batters.

Lundgren ceased playing professional ball in the US after his 2009–2010 season with the Brockton Rox. In 2010, he returned to Australia where he began playing for the Sydney Blue Sox of the Australian Baseball League.

In 2014, Lundgren was selected to play for Australia during the 2014 Major League Baseball Opening Series against the LA Dodgers and the Arizona Diamondbacks. Wayne played during the 5th inning, where he pitched a clean inning. Team Australia defeated the Diamondbacks 5–0.

On 24 January 2016, Lundgren pitched his final regular season professional game for the Blue Sox. The Blue Sox triumphed over the Melbourne Aces 10–8; Lundgren threw 5.1 innings and struck out seven batters. Wayne's longtime teammates Craig Anderson and Vaughan Harris met him on the mound at the end of his outing and the Blue Sox crowd gave him a fitting ovation.

Lundgren was one of four Blue Sox players selected to play for Team Australia during the 2016 World Baseball Classic Qualifier.

== Personal life ==
Lundgren grew to love baseball from a young age and was encouraged to pursue his passion by his parents Diana and Carl Lundgren. When he was 12 years old, Lundgren played for the Kellyville Under 12 team, coached by his father, Carl Ludgren. Carl, who won a scholarship to Rutgers University for basketball, was no stranger to organized sports. Wayne credits his belief that young baseball players should be concerned with learning, listening and having fun to his father. After Wayne moved on from the team, an award was set up in his name so as to recognize a Kellyville player for each season who truly embraced Carl's teachings. Wayne later requested that the award be presented in his father's name: the Coach Carl Award.
