= Timothy Cox (baseball) =

Australian baseball player (born 1986)

- Pitcher
- Born: 8 July 1986 (age 39); Sydney, Australia
- Bats: right Throws: left
- Stats at Baseball Reference

Timothy Mark Cox (born 8 July 1986 in Sydney, Australia) was an Australian baseball player who played for the New South Wales Patriots, Sydney Blue Sox and in the Boston Red Sox organisation.

== Early career ==
As an 18-year-old, Cox was signed to the Boston Red Sox organisation by Jon Deeble and had a solid first season with the GCL Red Sox going 3–1 with a 2.19 ERA and was promoted to the Lowell Spinners going a 1–1 season and a 3.89 ERA. His maiden season proving to be very successful with a Gulf Coast League best 56 strikeouts.

Tim made his debut for the New South Wales Patriots in 2005 Claxton Shield, going 1–0 with a 6.75 ERA.

He was then promoted to Class A with the Greenville Drive and as a relief pitcher he went 5–6 with a 2.80 ERA. His success was rewarded by making the Australia national baseball team for the 2006 Intercontinental Cup, he recorded a 1–1 with a 4.50 ERA.

In 2007, he was again promoted to the Lancaster JetHawks, but being the youngest on the team at 20 years old, Cox struggled with a 6.18 ERA and mid-season was hit in the head by a line drive and decided to retire from a career in the US.

== Claxton Shield ==
Cox returned to baseball in Australia for the 2008 Claxton Shield where he dominated the competition, going 3–0 with a 1.00 ERA and was awarded Claxton Shield Pitcher of the Year. Unfortunately he gave up a one run in the final, a solo shot from Mitch Graham, which would prove costly as Perth Heat's Mark Kelly would go on to throw a shutout.

He had an even better 2009 Claxton Shield going 3–0, and not conceding any earned runs, arguably the best pitching record in the history of the Claxton Shield. He led New South Wales to a semi-final victory in game two, pitching a shutout against the Victoria Aces. The only blemish on an almost perfect tournament was his outing in game two of the final against eventual champions, Perth Heat. He allowed 4 runs over 5.1 innings in a 4–5 loss. He won Pitcher of the Year for the second consecutive year.

His performances in Australia led him to being selected for Australia in the 2009 World Baseball Classic and 2009 Baseball World Cup.

In the 2010 Claxton Shield, he was again the best pitcher for New South Wales recording 3-1 and a 2.38 ERA, but New South Wales struggled and was eliminated in the semi-final against South Australia.

== Australian Baseball League ==
Cox didn't play in the Australian Baseball League until the 2012-13 season, making nine appearances for the Sydney Blue Sox going 1–2 with a 3.74 ERA. After another full season out of the top flight of Australian baseball, Cox played his final game in the ABL on 30 November 2014 finishing his 14-game ABL career 2-2 and a 4.76 ERA.
