= Andrew Graham (baseball) =

Australian baseball player and manager (born 1982)

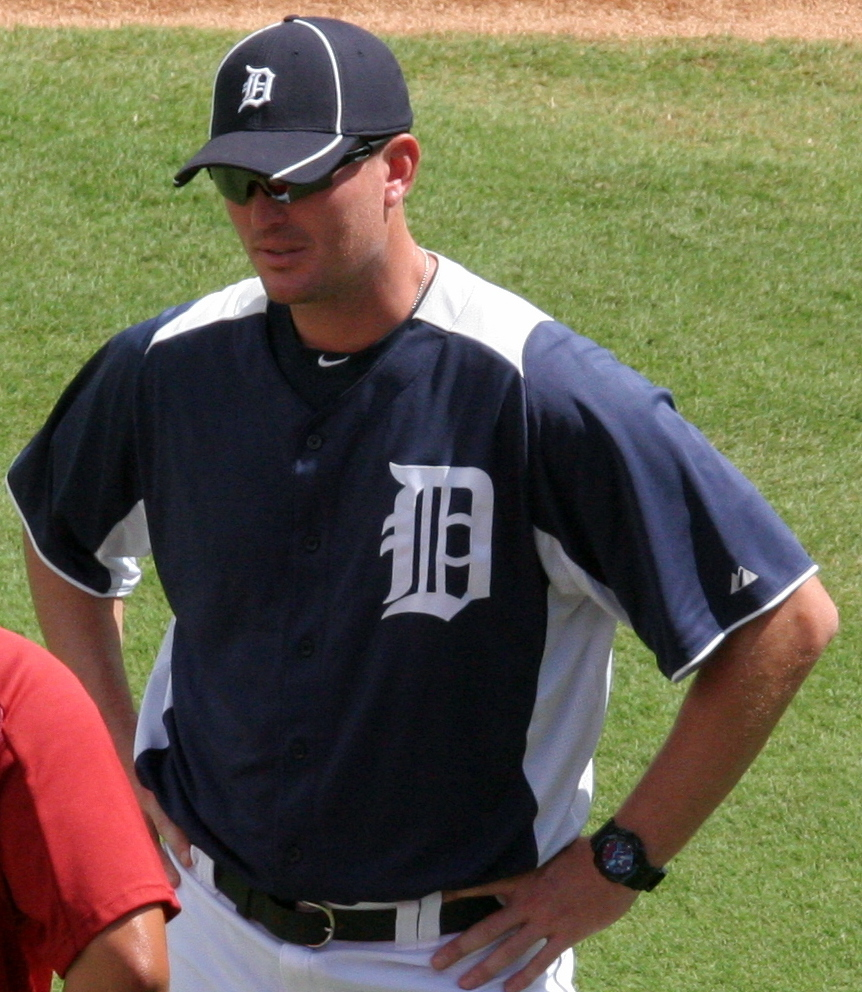
- Graham in 2012

Lakeland Flying Tigers
- Manager / Coach / Catcher
- Born: 22 April 1982 (age 43); Sydney, Australia
- Bats: Right Throws: Right
- Stats at Baseball Reference

Andrew Graham (born 22 April 1982) is an Australian baseball manager and former player who played with the Detroit Tigers organization from 2003–2007. Graham was most recently (2025) the manager of the Erie SeaWolves, a Double-A minor league affiliate of the Detroit Tigers. Growing up in Australia he played baseball for the Ku-ring-gai Stealers Baseball Club.

== Early career ==
Graham started his baseball career with Armstrong Atlantic State University in 2003. The Tigers picked him up in the 19th round of the 2003 Major League Baseball draft. He was assigned to the Oneonta Tigers and hit .182 in his first season. In 2004, he played for Oneonta (.280 in 8 games) and the West Michigan Whitecaps (.253 in 26 games).

Graham made his Claxton Shield debut in 2005, in which he was 3 for 14 for the New South Wales Patriots. He played for the Australian national baseball team in the 2005 Baseball World Cup, going 4 for 15 with a double and two passed balls in seven games, starting ahead of Trent D'Antonio.

In February 2006, Graham was selected to play in the World Baseball Classic.

In Claxton Shield 2006, the New South Wales catcher hit a .409/.435/.636 clip with 5 runs, 4 RBI and 5 doubles in five games. He was filling a big role replacing the catcher role with the retirement of long-time Australian star Gary White.

Graham hit only .127 in 28 games for Lakeland in 2006 but was better with the Erie SeaWolves, batting .276/.344/.362 in 20 games. In the 2006 Intercontinental Cup, he was 4 for 8 with two walks and 5 RBI as the backup to Matthew Kent.

He was only 3 for 20 with a homer and a walk in the 2007 Claxton Shield. Graham batted .208/.274/.292 in 36 games for the 2007 Toledo Mud Hens as the backup to a player with an even lower average that year, Dane Sardinha. In the 2007 Baseball World Cup, Graham hit .231/.389/.308 while splitting catching duties with Kent. In 2008, Graham was released as a free agent from the Detroit organisation.

In 2009, he was selected to play in the 2009 World Baseball Classic held in March, as the starting catcher alongside Joel Naughton. In September he was selected for 2009 Baseball World Cup, making it his third consecutive World Cup selection.

Graham played in the inaugural season of the rebooted Australian Baseball League for the Sydney Blue Sox in 2010–11. He played his last game in professional baseball with the team 5 February 2012 in the deciding preliminary series game of the 2012 Australian Baseball League postseason

== Coaching career ==
In December 2009, Graham was hired as the minor league catching coordinator for the Tigers and then as a coach with the GCL Tigers in 2010.

Since 2011, Graham has been a manager in the Detroit organization including the Connecticut Tigers from 2011-2013, West Michigan Whitecaps 2014-2016, Lakeland Flying Tigers in 2017 & 2019-2024, and Erie SeaWolves in 2018 & 2025.

With the Whitecaps in 2015, Graham led the team to the Midwest League championship going 75-64.

Graham was also a coach on Australia's 2017 World Baseball Classic roster.

Andrew Graham was selected as 2023 Florida State League Manager of the Year.
