= James Linger =

Australian baseball player

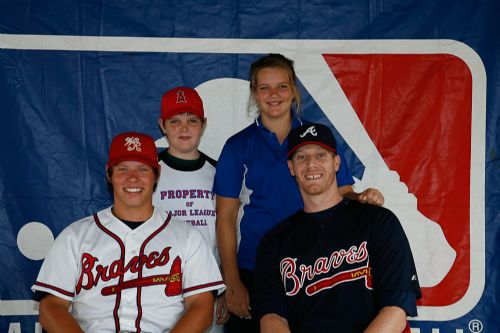
- Linger (left) and Phil Stockman in 2006
- Second baseman
- Born: 6 September 1990 (age 36); Box Hill, Victoria, Australia
- Bats: Right Throws: Right
- Stats at Baseball Reference

James Linger (born 6 September 1990) is an Australian former professional baseball player. He was signed to the Atlanta Braves organisation and plays second base for the GCL Braves.

== Career ==
Linger played Baseball for Norths in the Far North Coast Baseball Association competition, and also for the Queensland Rams in the 2008 Claxton Shield, batting at .394. He was then scouted by Phil Dale and signed with the Braves for $120,000 over five years.

James then joined the Australian national baseball team for the 2008 Final Olympic Qualification Tournament at just 17 years of age, making him the youngest player to play for Australia. He was named as Young Player of the Year at the Baseball Australia Diamond Awards.

In 2009, he had another solid tournament in the 2009 Claxton Shield, hitting .268 for the Rams. Later that year, he was a replacement call up to Australia's team for the 2009 Baseball World Cup, when Justin Huber was called up to the Majors. He was named Young Player of the Year in the 2009 Baseball Australian Diamond Awards.

Linger's last national level baseball was at the 2010 Claxton Shield, where he hit .091 in six games.
