= Shane Watson (disambiguation) =

Shane Watson is a former Australian international cricketer

Shane or Shayne Watson may also refer to:

- Shane Watson (footballer) (born 1974), former Australian rules footballer
- Shayne Watson (born 1983), baseball player and coach
