= Bradley Erasmus =

South African baseball player (born 1988)

Bradley Erasmus (born 6 July 1988) represented the South African national baseball team as a catcher in the 2006 World Baseball Classic when he was 17 years old and competed at the Africa/Europe 2020 Olympic Qualification tournament in Italy in September 2019.

His brother, Justin Erasmus, has also played for the South African team and professionally.
