= Ricky Meinhold =

American baseball player (born 1986)

- Pitcher / Coach
- Born: March 8, 1986 (age 40); St. Louis, Missouri, U.S.
- Bats: Switch Throws: Left
- Stats at Baseball Reference

Teams
- As coach: New York Mets (2020-2021)

Ricky Meinhold (born March 8, 1986) is an American former professional baseball pitcher who currently serves as the pitching coordinator for the Toronto Blue Jays of Major League Baseball (MLB). He has previously worked in MLB for the St. Louis Cardinals and New York Mets, in the KBO League for the Lotte Giants, in the Southeastern Conference for the Missouri Tigers, and in the Sun Belt Conference for the Appalachian State Mountaineers.

== Early life ==
Meinhold was born in St. Louis, Missouri. He attended Westmont High School in Campbell, California, and Georgia College & State University in Milledgeville, Georgia. Meinhold attended West Valley College in Saratoga, California from 2004 to 2006 earning an Associate of Arts in Liberal Arts and Sciences, General Studies and Humanities. From 2006 to 2008, Meinhold attended Drury University in Springfield, Missouri earning a Bachelor of Arts in Kinesiology and Exercise Science. He graduated in 2009.

== Playing career ==
While attending Drury University he played for both the Drury Panthers baseball team from 2007 to 2008 and the basketball team for the 2008–09 season.

Not being drafted coming out of college by a major league team, Meinhold was signed by the Gateway Grizzlies of the independent Frontier League on April 29, 2009, however, he would be released on May 17, 2009, having never played for the team. Meinhold began his playing career with the Windy City ThunderBolts after being signed on July 23, 2009. He posted a 4–3 record with a 3.35 ERA and 44 strikeouts in 11 games. His 2010 contract exercise was picked up by the Thunderbolts on December 3, 2009, and was signed to an extension on April 8, 2010. The 2010 season with the Thunderbolts proved poorly for Meinhold as he compiled an 0–2 record and a 5.56 ERA in 16 games. On July 15, 2010, Meinhold was traded to the Grizzlies, and the following day he was signed to a contract extension. His 2010 season with the Grizzlies was a poorer effort as he posted a 1–2 record with an 8.19 ERA. His contract option was picked up by the Grizzlies for the 2011 season but would be released on December 10, 2010, ending his playing career in the United States.

Meinhold moved to Australia and played for the South Australian team for the 2010 Claxton Shield regular season. He was the losing pitcher in the January 9, 2010, game against the Perth Heat losing 3-11.

== Coaching career ==
=== Coker College ===
Following his playing career, Meinhold was hired as the pitching coach, recruiting coordinator, and assistant athletic director of administration at Coker College from July 2011 to December 2013, while he was earning his Master of Science in Sports Administration. He graduated in 2014.

=== St. Louis Cardinals ===
In 2013, Meinhold was hired as a scout and as a coach for the St. Louis Cardinals minor-league affiliate Palm Beach Cardinals. After the 2014 season he was promoted to being a professional major league scout. From 2017 to 2019, he served as the pitching development analyst.

During his time with the Cardinals, he also served at USA Baseball for pitching development and evaluation. He would later serve as the pitching coach for the 2017 United States national under-18 baseball team.

=== New York Mets ===
In December 2019, Meinhold was hired by then-GM Brodie Van Wagenen as the minor league pitching coordinator for the New York Mets.

In January 2021, Meinhold was promoted by the Mets as the club's assistant pitching coach serving alongside Jeremy Accardo while retaining the minor league pitching coordinator position.

On September 23, 2021, Meinhold left his position as the assistant pitching coach and minor league pitching coordinator.

=== Lotte Giants ===
On November 6, 2021, Meinhold was hired as the director of pitching for the Lotte Giants of the KBO League.

=== University of Missouri ===
In the late summer of 2022, Missouri Tigers hired Meinhold as their pitching coach taking over after the passing of former Seattle Mariners bullpen coach/Director of Pitching, Brian DeLunas. Meinhold, as Assistant Major League Pitching Coach and Pitching Coordinator, hired DeLunas as Special Projects Coordinator with the New York Mets working together during the 2020–2021 season.

=== Appalachian State University ===
Due to the dismissal of Steve Bieser from the Missouri Tigers coming off a 30-win season and an appearance in the Southeastern Conference Baseball Tournament for the first time in three years, Meinhold was hired in the summer of 2023 as the Appalachian State Mountaineers baseball pitching coach. He replaced Justin Aspegren.

=== Toronto Blue Jays ===
On January 5, 2024, Meinhold left Appalachian State University to work in pitching development for the Toronto Blue Jays.
