= Alan Schoenberger =

Australian infielder (born 1989)

- Infielder
- Born: 19 January 1989 (age 36); Brisbane, Australia
- Bats: Switch Throws: Right

Alan Schoenberger (born 19 January 1989 in Brisbane, Australia) is an Australian infielder who had played for the Queensland Rams and with the Lakewood BlueClaws of the Philadelphia Phillies organisation.

In the 2010 Claxton Shield, Schoenberger was a regular starter in an under-performing Queensland Rams and batted with a .284 average and slugged .481 including three home runs.

He also played for New Zealand in the 2012 qualifier for the 2013 World Baseball Classic.
