= East Belmont Saints Baseball Club =

East Belmont Saints Baseball Club Inc
- Logo

Information
- League: Geelong Baseball Association (1sts, 2nds, 3rds, 4ths, 5ths, Women and junior grades)
- Location: Grovedale, Victoria
- Ballpark: Pioneer Park
- Founded: 1963
- Former name: St. Bernards Baseball Club
- Colors: Red, White, Black

Current uniforms
Current Home	Current Away	Original circa 1970

St. Bernards Baseball Club circa 1971

The East Belmont Saints is a baseball club playing in Australia's Geelong Baseball Association. The team plays their home games at Pioneer Park in Geelong, Australia.

Since 1963, the club has won 15 A-Grade premierships in the Geelong Baseball Association.

== About the Club ==
The club was created to encourage "healthy, organised and Christian recreation for the youth of St Bernards." The Saints began play as St. Bernard's Baseball Club, an affiliate of East Belmont Cricket Club based in Geelong. The club's first game was played in the 1963 winter competition and resulted in a 1–9–1 record.

The club underwent a name change in 1976 to East Belmont 'Saints' Baseball Club and later became East Belmont 'Saints' Baseball Club Inc, when it went through incorporation in 1988.

Saints has been one of the largest clubs in the GBA (Geelong Baseball Association) for over 35 years, having fielded minimum of five senior teams every year since 1986 when the club went from four to six senior teams. In 2024 the club fielded six senior teams with five senior grades and one Women's teams within the GBA competition. Saints are very supportive of junior baseball in Geelong and field teams in all age groups. In 2024 Saints fielded four junior teams being teeball, U12, U14, U16 age groups playing Saturday mornings. Saints regularly have female players in both senior and junior ranks of the club and support the league Women's Competition.

As St. Bernards the club won two A-Grade Premierships in 1970 & 1971. In 1986 the club won its first A-Grade premiership under the 'Saints' name and begun the club's most successful era as it went on to win 11 A-Grade premierships in 22 years through 2008. Saints has also won the GBA Club Championship 20 straight seasons from 1985 to 2004. In 2019 Saints had a successful year returning to the Grand Final, finishing runners-up in the premier A-Grade competition. More recently, Saints has won in Firsts grade in 2022 and 2024 with the league renaming its Senior grades to Firsts, Seconds, Thirds, Fourths, Fifths in 2023.

== Ground Facility ==
Prior to 1984 the club home ground was Winters Reserve, Kidman Ave, Belmont, Victoria.

1984 to 1992 the club home ground was South Barwon Reserve No.2 Oval.

Since 1993, East Belmont Saints Baseball Club have been located at Pioneer Park which in 2003 became within the boundary of the newly built Geelong Baseball Centre, Saints use Diamonds 3 & 4 of the baseball centre. Saints second diamond (GBC3) is the only fully synthetic diamond in Australia. Saints main diamond (GBC4) is grass with full skin infield and weather-protected dugouts with the home (3B) dugout sunken in the ground to improve spectator viewing from within the clubhouse. Saints clubrooms and main diamond are visible directly to the north from Pioneer Road, Grovedale located on the East side of Waurn Ponds Creek. Pioneer Road carries over 20,000 cars per day (VicRoads statistic) commuting to or past the Waurn Ponds Shopping complex.

In 2019 the club added an indoor hitting facility with hitting tunnel and open floor for hitting and fielding skills development.

In 2022 the club added a 4-pack under cover bull pen for pitching, catching and skills work.

== Events ==
Saints have hosted State, National and international baseball events at its facility in Grovedale, including the 2009 and 2013 Australian Masters Games, the 2010 Australian Provincial Championships and 2013 Australian National Youth Championships.

More recently, Saints hosted the Australian Women's Championships and Women's Youth Nationals in April 2018. Victoria Youth girls won the Youth Gold medal game defeating New South Wales on Saints home field (GBC4).

In 2011 Saints launched their inaugural 'Go Pink for Cancer' day and have done so each year until 2019 (COVID-19 ended the event in 2020). The day raised funds for the Cancer Council Victoria. In 2014 Saints raised over $5,000, and in 2015 over $6,000 was raised. The day continued to raise around $5,000 each year and through 2019 has donated in excess of $42,000 to Cancer Council Victoria. As a result of this fundraising the Cancer Council Victoria awarded a research grant in the name of Saints and Deakin baseball clubs to help find a cure for children's leukaemia.

Saints have been regular host for the Baseball Victoria State Senior Winter Championships in recent years, the championships are played on Queens Birthday weekend each year.

January 2020, Saints co-hosted (with Geelong Baycats) the U16/U18 Australian Youth Championships, the championships were run by Baseball Australia

February 2020, Saints facility was used by 2019 Korean Baseball Organisation Champion Doosan Bears for their 2020 Spring Camp.

February 2025 and February 2026, Saints facility was used by KT Wiz of the Korean Baseball Organisation for their Spring Camp prior to the 2025 and 2026 KBO seasons.

== Premierships, Club Champions and Ford Cup ==
- Rena Whykes Cup - Firsts Grade (formerly A-Grade) Premierships
  - 1970^, 1971^, 1986, 1988, 1991, 1992, 1994, 1996, 1998, 1999, 2003, 2004, 2008, 2022, 2024
- Alex Everett Trophy - Club Champions
  - 1985, 1986, 1987, 1988, 1989, 1990, 1991, 1992, 1993, 1994, 1995, 1996, 1997, 1998, 1999, 2000, 2001, 2002, 2003, 2004, 2021, 2022, 2023, 2024, 2025
- Ford Shield - Firsts/A-Grade Minor Premiers
  - 1970^, 1971^, 1985, 1986, 1987, 1988, 1989, 1990, 1991, 1994, 1995, 1998, 1999, 2003, 2004, 2022, 2023, 2024, 2025
- Mick O'Brien Shield - GBA Junior Club Champions
  - 2015, 2016, 2018, 2023, 2024, 2025
- Adams Cup - Seconds Grade (formerly A-Reserve/B-Grade) Premierships
  - 1972^, 1986, 1990, 1992, 1993, 1995, 1997, 1999, 2000, 2003, 2008, 2021, 2022, 2023
- Clarrie Smith Cup - Thirds Grade (formerly B-Grade/C-Grade) Premierships
  - 1976, 1979, 1985, 1987, 2004, 2005, 2006, 2025
- Alan (Mick) Lambert Cup - Fourths Grade (formerly B-Reserve/D-Grade) Premierships
  - 1983, 1992(D2), 1986, 1998
- Craig Rickard Cup - Fifths Grade (formerly D-Grade/E-Grade) Premierships
  - 1996, 2010

^St Bernards Baseball Club

== FIRSTS 2024 Grand Final Premiership Line Up ==
Player	Position	Number
Emerson Rickard	P	15
Harper Rickard	C	28
Dion Kirchner	1B	68
Mitch Collins	2B	34
Will Brennan	3B	33
Cameron Brown	SS	42
Connor Hughes	LF	53
Sam Reale	CF	14
Brayden Bebee	RF	25
Josh Lee	DH	84
Cameron Brown	Manager	42
Andrew Hamilton	Assist. Coach	98
Chris Rickard	3B Coach	5
Julie Rickard	Scorer	

== See also ==
- List of baseball teams in Australia
