= Ryan Battaglia =

Australian baseball player (born 1992)

Brisbane Bandits – No. 29
- Catcher
- Born: 29 June 1992 (age 34); Brisbane, Australia
- Bats: Right Throws: Right

ABL debut
- 26 November, 2010, for the Brisbane Bandits

ABL statistics (through 7 February 2021)
- Batting average: .200
- Home runs: 27
- Runs batted in: 80
- Stats at Baseball Reference
Medals
Men's baseball
Representing Australia
World Junior Baseball Championship
Silver medal – second place	2010 Thunder Bay	National team
Haarlem Baseball Week
Bronze medal – third place	2016 Haarlem	National team

Ryan John Battaglia (born 29 June 1992), nicknamed Boof, is an Australian professional baseball catcher for the Brisbane Bandits of the Australian Baseball League (ABL).

== Career ==
=== Brisbane Bandits ===
Battaglia was reassigned from the Bandits 22-man roster for the start of the season, but was called up later in the season due to the injury of Joel Naughton. He made his debut as a defensive substitution on 26 November 2010 against the Sydney Blue Sox, being the youngest player to play for the Bandits. It took until his seventh game before Battaglia got his first hit, going 3–6 against the Canberra Cavalry. Battaglia's only other hit that season would be a home run against the Adelaide Bite, finishing the season only above Daniel Lamb-Hunt in average, with .143.

Battaglia plays for the Pine Hills Lightning in the Greater Brisbane League where he led the league in home runs (with eight) for the 2009–2010 season.

=== Cleveland Indians ===
Battaglia signed a minor league contract with the Cleveland Indians organization on June 19, 2011. He split his first affiliated season between the rookie-level Arizona League Indians and Low-A Mahoning Valley Scrappers, going 0-for-11 with one RBI and two walks over seven games. Battaglia returned to the AZL Indians in 2012, playing in 29 games and batting .214/.382/.417 with three home runs, 19 RBI, and one stolen base.

Battaglia split the 2013 season between Mahoning Valley and the Single-A Carolina Mudcats, playing in 39 total games and slashing .212/.326/.363 with three home runs and 13 RBI. He split the 2014 campaign between Carolina and the High-A Lake County Captains. In 32 appearances for the two affiliates, Battaglia batted a combined .109/.224/.196 with one home run and eight RBI.

Battaglia was released by the Indians organization on March 26, 2015.

== International career ==
Battaglia has played for Australian junior teams and, in 2010, starred for the Australia national under-19 baseball team where they finished second in the World AAA Championships. He was awarded the tournament Home Run Award and named as the catcher in the All-Star team.

On 8 October 2019, he was selected at the 2019 WBSC Premier12.
