= PJ Bevis =

Australian baseball pitcher

P.J. Bevis
- Pitcher
- Born: 28 July 1980 (age 45); Brisbane, Queensland, Australia
- Bats: Right Throws: Right
- Stats at Baseball Reference

P.J. Bevis (born 28 July 1980, in Brisbane, Australia) is an Australian former professional baseball pitcher. Bevis has played professional baseball ranging from Rookie to AAA for over 13 years, including time with the Arizona Diamondbacks, New York Mets, and Colorado Rockies organizations.

== Career ==
Bevis was on the big league roster for three years with the Arizona Diamondbacks & the New York Mets, as well as playing in the Can-Am League, Golden Baseball League and Northern League. He attended Cavendish Road State High School.

Bevis was signed by the Arizona organisation in 1998 as a 17-year-old before being traded in 2002, playing AA, to the New York Mets. He would play a couple of seasons for the organisation in AA and AAA as well as pitching spring training for the Mets, Bevis signed a one-year contract with the Colorado Rockies for the 2005 season. Despite playing 3 seasons of AAA baseball, Bevis has never played in the Major Leagues.

Bevis led the 2005 AA Texas League in saves with 21 while pitching for the Tulsa Drillers, who are the AA affiliate for the Colorado Rockies. Bevis was named to the 2005 AA Texas league All-Star team Despite only pitching in 12 games for Yakima in 2001 Bevis was 3rd in the league in saves with 8.

In 2003, Bevis was named as the 2003 Claxton Shield MVP for the Championship series and was named in the All-Star team as a relief pitching, posting a flat 0 ERA and .077 opponent batting average.
