= Geelong Baseball Park =

Stadium specifically built for baseball in Geelong, Australia

- Interactive map of Geelong Baseball Park
- Location: Pioneer Rd, Grovedale, Victoria, Australia
- Coordinates: 38°11′50″S 144°19′20″E
- Owner: Victoria Government
- Capacity: 5,000 (1,500 seated)
- Surface: Grass
- Field size: Left Field – 320 feet (98 m); Center Field – 380 feet (116 m); Right Field – 330 feet (101 m)

Construction
- Opened: 2002
- Renovated: 2007

Tenants
- Geelong Baycats; Guild Allstars; East Belmont Saints Baseball Club; Geelong-Korea

The Geelong Baseball Centre or Geelong Baseball Park is home to Geelong Baseball Club in Geelong, Victoria during summer and the Guild Allstars Baseball Club and East Belmont Saints Baseball Club during the winter season. In total the Geelong Baseball Centre has four playing fields, with the main diamond being one of the few international standard baseball ballparks in Australia. Features include lighting up to international standard, electronic scoreboard and associated infrastructure in the form of elevated commentary box, outfield sightboards, bullpen tunnels, meeting and dining areas and an indoor training facility. The main stadium is secured and there is ample car parking space.

It was built in 2002 to coincide with the World Masters Games and hosted baseball successfully. It has also hosted the Victorian Masters Games, international friendly matches, Claxton Shield 2009 games, 2009 World Masters Games, the 2010 Australian Provincial Championships and 2012 & 2013 U16/U18 National Youth Championships. 2020 U16/U18 National Youth Championships.

The complex has been used as a pre-season training camp for the Japanese Pacific League team the Chiba Lotte Marines and Doosan Bears from the Korean KBO league.
