= David Washington =

American baseball player (born 1990)

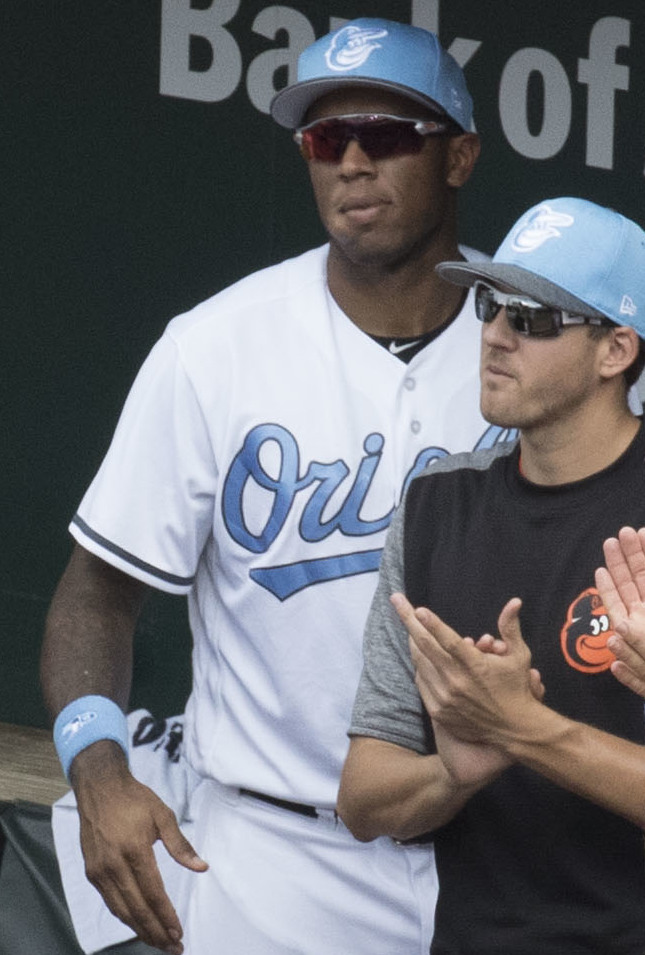
- Washington (left) with the Baltimore Orioles in 2017

Free agent
- First baseman / Outfielder
- Born: November 20, 1990 (age 35); San Diego, California
- Bats: Left Throws: Left

MLB debut
- June 14, 2017, for the Baltimore Orioles

MLB statistics (through 2017 season)
- Batting average: .000
- Home runs: 0
- Runs batted in: 0
- Stats at Baseball Reference

Teams
- Baltimore Orioles (2017)

David Edward Washington (born November 20, 1990) is an American professional baseball first baseman and outfielder who is a free agent. He has previously played in Major League Baseball (MLB) for the Baltimore Orioles.

== Career ==
=== St. Louis Cardinals ===
Washington attended University City High School in San Diego, California and was drafted by the St. Louis Cardinals in the 15th round of the 2009 MLB draft. He played in the Cardinals organization until 2016.

Washington split the 2016 season between the Double–A Springfield Cardinals and Triple–A Memphis Redbirds, hitting .259/.359/.532 with 30 home runs and 77 RBI across 127 total games. He elected free agency following the season on November 7, 2016.

=== Baltimore Orioles ===
On November 22, 2016, Washington signed a minor league contract with the Baltimore Orioles organization. On June 14, 2017, Washington was selected to the 40-man roster and promoted to the major leagues for the first time. He made his MLB debut the same day, going hitless in a 10-6 Orioles win over the Chicago White Sox. In 3 games for Baltimore, he went 0–for–6 in limited action. On July 6, Washington was designated for assignment by the Orioles following the promotion of Johnny Giavotella.

Washington cleared waivers and was sent outright to the Triple–A Norfolk Tides on July 11. In 103 games for Norfolk, Washington batted .264/.315/.478 with 18 home runs and 42 RBI. He elected free agency following the season on November 6.

=== Long Island Ducks ===
On February 13, 2018, Washington signed with the Long Island Ducks of the Atlantic League of Professional Baseball. He re-signed with the team for the 2019 season, and became a free agent following the season.

=== Milwaukee Milkmen ===
On February 3, 2020, Washington signed with the Milwaukee Milkmen of the American Association. He played in 60 games for the team, hitting .245/.298/.435 with 8 home runs and 34 RBI. Washington won the American Association championship with the Milkmen in 2020.

On March 22, 2021, Washington re-signed with the Milkmen. He appeared in 62 games for Milwaukee in 2021, slashing .325/.402/.628 with 17 home runs, 61 RBI, and eight stolen bases.

=== Winnipeg Goldeyes ===
On January 6, 2022, Washington was traded to the Winnipeg Goldeyes of the American Association in exchange for RHP Tyler Smith and a player to be named later. In 99 games for Winnipeg, Washington hit .273/.365/.564 with 30 home runs, 80 RBI, and 13 stolen bases.

=== Gastonia Honey Hunters ===
On July 11, 2023, Washington signed with the Gastonia Honey Hunters of the Atlantic League of Professional Baseball. In 62 games for Gastonia, he hit .261/.361/.601 with 22 home runs and 51 RBI. Washington would become a free agent at the end of the season.

=== Dorados de Chihuahua ===
On April 27, 2024, Washington signed with the Dorados de Chihuahua of the Mexican League. He played in only one game for the Dorados, going 0–for–4 with four strikeouts. On April 30, Washington was released by Chihuahua.

=== York Revolution ===
On May 3, 2024, Washington signed with the York Revolution of the Atlantic League of Professional Baseball. In 50 games for York, Washington batted .298/.362/.693 with 23 home runs and 60 RBI.

=== Saraperos de Saltillo ===
On July 1, 2024, Washington's contract was purchased by the Saraperos de Saltillo of the Mexican League. He went 2–for–11 (.182) with one RBI across three games. Washington was released by Saltillo on July 5.

=== York Revolution (second stint) ===
On July 16, 2024, Washington signed with the York Revolution of the Atlantic League of Professional Baseball. With York, Washington won the Atlantic League championship. He became a free agent following the season.
