= Brett Tamburrino =

Australian baseball player

Olympic medal record

Men's Baseball
Silver medal – second place	2004 Athens	Team competition

Brett Tamburrino (born 10 November 1981) is an Australian former baseballer. In 2004, he was part of the Australian Olympic baseball team, who achieved a Silver Medal in the baseball tournament at the Athens Olympics.

Tamburrino played for the Melbourne Aces in their inaugural 2010–11 season.
