= Andrew Utting =

Australian baseball players

Olympic medal record

Men's Baseball
Silver medal – second place	2004 Athens	Team competition

Andrew Utting (born 9 September 1977) is an Australian former professional baseball player.

== Career ==
In 2004, he was part of the Australian Olympic baseball team that won a silver medal in the baseball tournament at the Athens Olympics. He studied biomedical science at Bond University. He played for Tokushima Indigo Socks in Japan's Shikoku-Kyūshū Island League.
