= Shayne Watson =

Australian baseball player

Brisbane Bandits – No. 13
- Infielder
- Born: 25 August 1982 (age 44); Brisbane, Australia
- Batted: Left Threw: Right

ABL debut
- 12 November, 2010, for the Brisbane Bandits

Last appearance
- 27 November, 2015, for the Brisbane Bandits

ABL statistics (through 2011)
- Batting average: .209
- Runs batted in: 5
- Stats at Baseball Reference

Teams
- Brisbane Bandits (2010–11, 2015–16); Brisbane Bandits (2011–) as coach

Shayne Watson (born 25 August 1982) is an Australian professional baseball player who is third base coach for the Brisbane Bandits in the Australian Baseball League. He is one of the three captains of the team.

== Career ==
He made his debut for the Bandits on 10 November 2010 against the Perth Heat as a defensive substitute for catcher Joel Naughton. He had his first at-bat the next day, playing catcher and going 3/4 against the Heat. Despite initially being named as an outfielder in the squad, he didn't take the outfield all season. A season-ending injury to starting catcher Naughton forced Watson to share the catching duties with rookies Mitch Nilsson and Ryan Battaglia as well as occasionally playing third base.

Following the 2010–11 Australian Baseball League season 2011, he was dropped from the active roster, but named as one of the coaches for the Bandits. In 2015–16 he was added to the roster as an emergency defensive replacement when coaching with the team on the road. He was a defensive replacement only in five games.

Watson is now the High Performance Manager for Baseball Queensland and continues to be part of the Bandits and Team Australia coaching staff.
