= Dylan Peacock =

Gibraltarian footballer (born 2001)

Personal information
- Full name: Dylan Paul Peacock
- Date of birth: 24 August 2001 (age 25)
- Place of birth: Gibraltar
- Height: 1.68 m (5 ft 6 in)
- Positions: Midfielder; forward

Team information
- Current team: College 1975
- Number: 11

Youth career
- –2019: Lincoln Red Imps
- 2019–2020: Algeciras

Senior career*
Years	Team	Apps	(Gls)
2018–2019	Lincoln Red Imps	10	(2)
2019–2020	Algeciras	0	(0)
2020	Bruno's Magpies	5	(1)
2020	Boca Gibraltar	5	(1)
2021–2022	Lincoln Red Imps	18	(2)
2021	→ Lions Gibraltar (loan)	11	(0)
2022–2023	Bruno's Magpies	11	(2)
2023	→ Glacis United (loan)	6	(1)
2023–2024	Mons Calpe	23	(3)
2024–2025	Manchester 62	20	(2)
2026–	College 1975	1	(0)

International career^{‡}
	Gibraltar U16		(0)
2016–2017	Gibraltar U17	5	(0)
2017–2019	Gibraltar U19	9	(0)
2019–2022	Gibraltar U21	15	(1)
2023–	Gibraltar	1	(0)
- * Club domestic league appearances and goals as of 21 August 2026 ‡ National team caps and goals as of 21 November 2023

Dylan Paul Peacock (born 24 August 2001), also known as Didi, is a Gibraltarian footballer who currently plays as an attacking midfielder or forward for College 1975 and the Gibraltar national football team.

== International career ==
Didi made his international debut for Gibraltar on 21 November 2023 against the Netherlands. Prior to this he had played for Gibraltar at every youth level, notably scoring a late penalty in a 1–1 draw with Bulgaria U21 in June 2022.
