= Chris Lamb =

Australian rules footballer (born 1981)

Personal information
- Full name: Christopher Lamb
- Nicknames: Robocop, Lamby, Chop, Rakka
- Born: 11 March 1981 (age 45)
- Original teams: Wodonga Raiders; Murray Bushrangers
- Draft: 13th overall, 1998 National Draft
- Height: 192 cm (6 ft 4 in)
- Weight: 98 kg (216 lb)
- Position: Defender

Playing career^{1}
| Years | Club | Games (Goals) |
| 1999–2004 | Melbourne | 21 (1) |
- ^{1} Playing statistics correct to the end of 2003.

Christopher Lamb (born 11 March 1981) is a former Australian rules footballer who played with the Melbourne Football Club in the Australian Football League (AFL) and with the Sandringham Football Club in the Victorian Football League (VFL).

== Early life ==
Lamb was a talented junior sportsman. As a footballer, he toured Ireland in 1998 as part of an Australian Institute of Sport team. He also played for the Wodonga Raiders in the Ovens & Murray Football League, and for the Murray Bushrangers in the TAC Cup, winning the Bushrangers' under-16 development award in 1997. Lamb had a successful final season of junior football; he played for the Victorian Country side at the 1998 AFL Under 18 Championships where he was named All-Australian, and was also chosen in the TAC Cup Team of the Year. Lamb was also a highly regarded basketball player, representing the Australian under-16 and under-18 teams.

== AFL career ==
Many AFL clubs were interested in the 17-year-old Lamb at the 1998 AFL draft. Likened to champion St Kilda full-back Danny Frawley, experts suggested that he could be a top-five draft selection, but he slipped through to 13th and was taken by Melbourne with their first pick. The Demons' recruiting manager at the time, Craig Cameron, claimed Lamb was "one of the top five players in the draft" and said the Demons were excited to draft him.

It was hoped that Lamb would develop into a key player for the Demons, who needed to replace aging defenders Jamie Shanahan and Anthony Ingerson. After what was described by journalist Jake Niall as a "very good pre-season", Lamb made his AFL debut in the first match of the 1999 season. He had eight disposals and was selected the following week, but then had a poor game, only having two touches for the entire match and being comprehensively beaten by Barry Hall. Lamb was dropped for round 3, despite it being noted that "he rarely had goals kicked on him". Lamb spent the rest of the season playing for Melbourne's VFL-affiliate, Sandringham. He also spent the whole of the 2000 season playing in the VFL for the Zebras. Sandringham made the VFL Grand Final in 2000, but Lamb was injured and missed the match. At the start of the 2001 season, Lamb broke into the senior team for his first AFL match in almost two years. He was, however, dropped the following week and only played two more for matches for the Demons in 2001.

The 2002 season started poorly for Lamb, spending the first half of the year with Sandringham. His opportunity came in round 12. One of Melbourne's key defensive players, Alastair Nicholson, had injured his knee in the previous match and Lamb was required to fill in for him. Despite not having a possession, he was selected for the next game. Lamb began to play well, becoming a key figure in the Demons' defence and playing every game for the rest of the season. In round 15, he kicked his first and only AFL goal. In a match late in the 2002 home and away season, Lamb attempted a spoil and landed awkwardly on his neck. He was motionless for several minutes and there were concerns that he may have broken his neck. The incident was described as "sickening", but Lamb only had a slight concussion and he played the following week. He played in both of Melbourne's finals in 2002, was awarded the Demons' "Most Improved Player" award at the end of the year and was described by The Age as "the find of Melbourne's 2002 season". Lamb signed a new contract with Melbourne at the end of the season.

Despite his form in 2002 and his continued good play for Sandringham, where he was regularly named best on ground, Lamb was unable to gain a consistent position in the seniors in 2003, regularly being overlooked. He played one game, in round 2 against Essendon, but was only on the field for a quarter before being benched for the rest of the game after being beaten by Matthew Lloyd. Midway through the season, after two best on ground performances for the Zebras failed to result in a senior call-up, a rumour of a rift between Lamb and coach, Neale Daniher, began to grow. Daniher dismissed the rumour, saying that the reason Lamb was out of the side was because "he had to lose some weight, improve his endurance and mobility, and learn to play further afield". After he was dropped, he lost four kilograms, improved his up-the-ground play and was regularly one of Sandringham's best players. Although Daniher had stated that "he [Lamb] will be back", Lamb only played two more games in 2003 and it appeared that he had lost favour with the Melbourne coaching staff, as the Melbourne defence was lacking in height and strong bodies, which Lamb could have provided. His last game was against Adelaide. Crows forward Ian Perrie kicked two goals on Lamb in the first quarter and he was benched for the rest of the game. Lamb was dropped for the next match, never made his way back into Melbourne's senior team and was described as "exiled" by Rohan Connolly.

Lamb was retained on the Demons list for 2004, but he failed to play a senior game for the season, instead playing with Sandringham. Although a disappointing year for Lamb in terms of senior AFL appearances, he did win a VFL premiership with Sandringham, taking a saving mark in the dying seconds to help the Zebras hold on to victory. Melbourne delisted Lamb at the end of the season.

== VFL career ==
After being delisted by Melbourne, Lamb spent 2005 travelling. When he returned in 2006, Lamb signed with Sandringham, saying the Zebras were the "only club [he] would play for". Sandringham had won another VFL premiership in 2005 and they were looking to win a hat-trick of flags. Lamb played at full-back all season and was a key member of Sandringham's premiership-winning team. In the first round of 2007 Lamb played his 100th game for the Zebras. At the end of the season, he won the "Coaches Award", and was named as full-back in the VFL Team of the Year. Lamb played on for one more season and retired at the end of 2008. He finished his career with Sandringham having played 137 games.

== Personal life ==
Lamb's brother Andrew was also drafted into the AFL. He was taken with the 36th selection in the 1995 Draft by St Kilda, but was delisted at the end of the 1998 season, having never played an AFL match.

Lamb was the best man at his Melbourne teammate Troy Broadbridge's wedding. Broadbridge died only days later while on his honeymoon in the Boxing Day tsunami. Lamb named his first child Benjamin Troy as a tribute to Broadbridge.

Lamb is now a primary school teacher in Melbourne Victoria.
