= 1986 Claxton Shield =

1986 Claxton Shield Champions

Victoria
13th title

The 1986 Claxton Shield was the 47th annual Claxton Shield. The participants were South Australia, New South Wales Patriots, Victoria Aces, Western Australia, Queensland Rams and Northern Territory. The series was won by Victoria.

The competition continued its eastern and western divisional format adopted in the 1984 Claxton Shield, with the winners of both divisions playing in a final.

The highlight of the competition was the eastern sector final between Victoria and Queensland at Holloway Field, when after a scathing opinion piece written by Queensland manager Mike Young about Victorian manager John Galloway tempers were high throughout the game. This culminated in an incident later in the game when Bob Nilsson intentionally threw at a Victorian batter, who in turn threw his bat at Nilsson, leading the benches to clear. After three ejections, Victoria won the game, but had to be escorted from the field due to abusive spectators.

The Helms Award was given to pitcher Lindsay Orford of Victoria.
