= Ryan Murphy (baseball) =

Athletics
- Pitcher
- Born: October 8, 1999 (age 27); Poughkeepsie, New York, U.S.
- Bats: Right Throws: Right

Ryan Charles Murphy (born October 8, 1999) is an American professional baseball pitcher in the Athletics organization.

== Career ==
=== San Francisco Giants ===
Murphy was born in Poughkeepsie, New York, and attended Roy C. Ketcham High School in Wappingers Falls, New York. He played college baseball at Le Moyne College, and was 16–9 with a 3.40 ERA over three seasons. He was drafted by the San Francisco Giants in the fifth round of the 2020 Major League Baseball draft.

Murphy made his professional debut in 2021 with the San Jose Giants before being promoted to the Eugene Emeralds. Over 21 starts between the two clubs, Murphy went 6–4 with a 2.52 ERA and 164 strikeouts over 107 1/3 innings (13.8 strikeouts per 9 innings). He was named a California League post-season All Star and an MiLB Organization All Star. In 2022, Murphy pitched for the Arizona Complex League Giants, San Jose, Eugene, and the Richmond Flying Squirrels. He was a combined 2–1 with a 4.63 ERA in 11 games (nine starts) in which he pitched 42 1/3 innings and struck out 57 batters.

Murphy played with Richmond for the entirety of the 2023 season and appeared in 29 games (27 starts), going 2–9 with a 4.36 ERA and 107 strikeouts over 107 1/3 innings. He returned to Richmond in 2024, going 1–4 with a 3.35 ERA over 11 starts while missing time due to injury. Murphy opened the 2025 season on the 60-day injured list before being appearing in games with San Jose and Richmond, pitching to a 5.59 ERA over 19 1/3 innings. He played in the Arizona Fall League for the Scottsdale Scorpions following the end of the regular season and was named Pitcher of the Week in Week 4.

=== St. Louis Cardinals ===
After the 2025 season, Murphy was selected by the St. Louis Cardinals in the Minor League phase of the Rule 5 draft. He elected free agency on November 2, 2026.

=== Athletics ===
On November 17, 2026, Murphy signed a minor league contract with the Athletics.
