= Liam Hopkins =

British artist (born 1985)

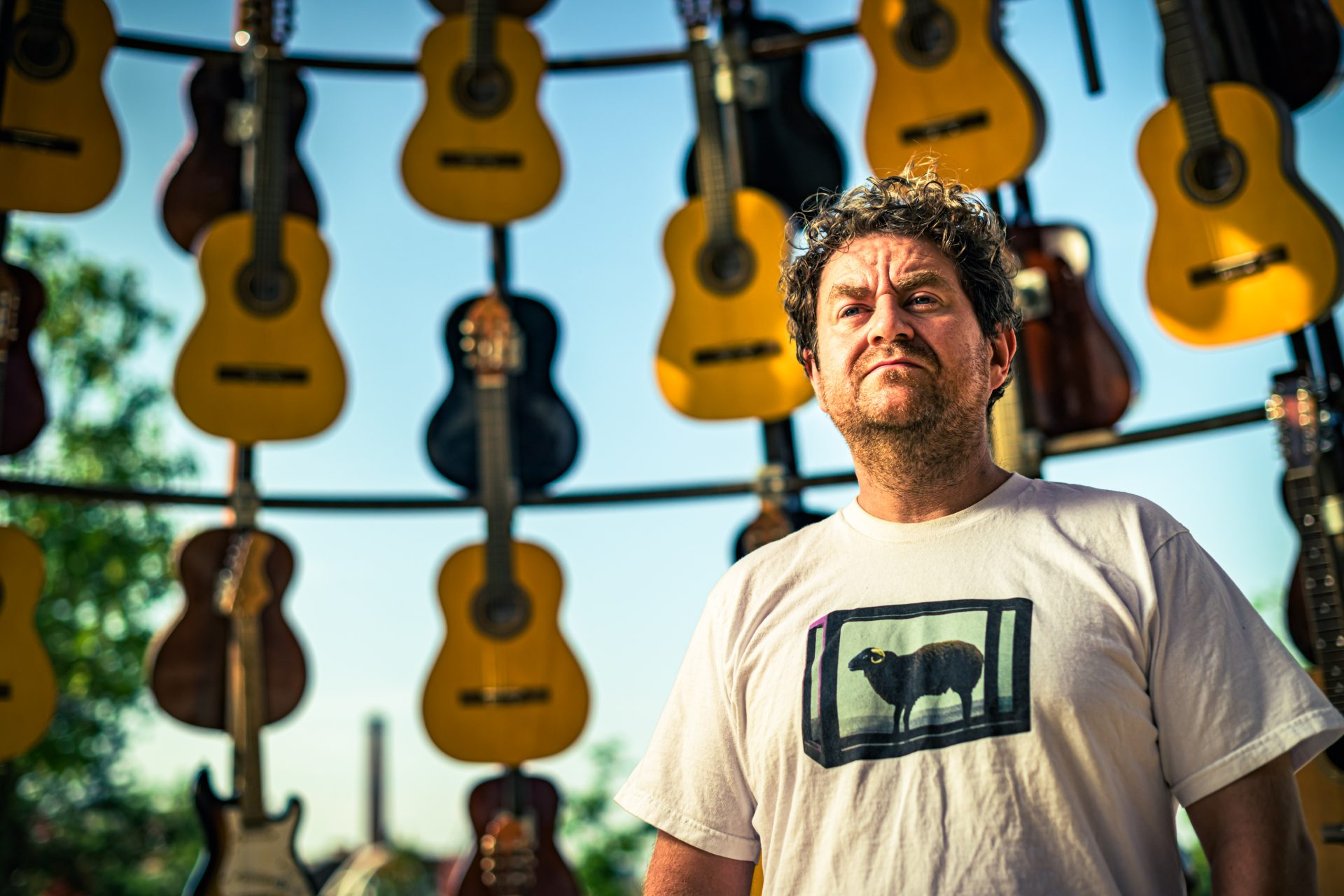
- Portrait of Liam Hopkins of Lazerian inside one of his art sculpture creation named Cathedral of Sound
- Born: 1985 (age 40–41); Ashton-under-Lyne, Greater Manchester, England
- Education: Manchester Metropolitan University
- Known for: Design, sculpture, public art, furniture
- Notable work: Chromatogram, Local Fish, Cathedral of Sound, Polo the Polar Bear
- Awards: Best in Show, Liverpool Design Show; Runner-up, 2008 Grand Design Awards; Shortlisted, Arts Foundation Futures Awards 2019
- Website: lazerian.com

Liam Hopkins (born 1985) is a British artist, sculptor, and designer based in Manchester. He is the founder of the creative studio Lazerian, established in 2006, which combines traditional craftsmanship with digital technologies to create works in architectural decoration, exhibitions, lighting, furniture, jewellery, and sculpture. Hopkins' work has been exhibited internationally, including in Milan, New York, London, Moscow, and Hull, and is held in collections such as the Moscow Design Museum, Museo Poldi Pezzoli in Milan, and Manchester Art Gallery.

== Early life and education ==
Hopkins was born in 1985 in Ashton-under-Lyne, Greater Manchester. Growing up, he developed an interest in making and repairing, restoring a Lambretta scooter at age 13 and a Mini car from ages 15 to 17.

Hopkins studied 3D design at Tameside Technical College starting in 2000, followed by a Bachelor of Arts in 3D design at Manchester Metropolitan University (MMU), where he experimented with materials such as glass, metal, wood, and ceramics.

== Career ==
After graduating, Hopkins founded Lazerian in 2006 in a mill workshop in Mossley, initially creating display stands for Callaway Golf. The studio's name derives from his father's middle name, inspired by Saint Laserian from Old Leighlin, Ireland.

A table he designed won Best in Show for furniture design at the Liverpool Design Show. A refined version was runner-up in the 2008 Grand Design Awards and acquired for the permanent collection of the Moscow Design Museum.

Hopkins collaborated with artist Richard Sweeney on cardboard furniture featured in the 2009 Crafts Council touring exhibition Lab Craft. Lazerian, now based in Denton, uses materials like paper, wood, and carbon fibre, blending hand-craft with digital modelling.

Hopkins' work often uses reclaimed and recycled materials such as cardboard, electronic waste, and single-use plastics.

=== Selected work ===
His key works include the following:

- Chromatogram (2017), 15 ten-foot-tall cardboard pods for the National Festival of Making in Blackburn.
- Local Fish (2017), a four-meter paper sculpture for Hull's Paper City exhibition as part of UK City of Culture.
- Cathedral of Sound (2025), a wind-powered sonic sculpture from donated guitars for Manchester's Music for the Senses trail.
- Polo the Polar Bear (2016), a 2.5m tall, 6m long aluminum sculpture commissioned by New Bailey.
- Weaver Bird, a copper bird sculpture for Darwen Market Square (2018).
- Formula E replica (2021), a non-drivable replica of a Gen2 Formula E car constructed from single-use plastic, in collaboration with Envision Racing and Kids Against Plastic.
- Recover E (2023), a drivable Formula E race car constructed entirely from electronic waste, created in collaboration with Envision Racing; the project won the 'Most Inspiring Campaign' at the 2024 Race Media Awards.
- Commissioned in 2024 to repurpose a historic Venetian glass chandelier into a public art installation for Manchester Airport's Terminal 2 departures lounge, in collaboration with Manchester School of Architecture students.

He has also contributed to exhibitions such as the Alcantara and Not Just A Label textiles experience in London (2018) and the Glory Glory typographic art exhibition in London (2013). Hopkins serves as an associate lecturer in product design and craft at MMU. He has worked with clients including Bloomberg, Virgin, Habitat, Liberty, Heal's, Wallpaper*, Nestlé, and the MOBO Awards.

== Personal life ==
Hopkins is in a long-term partnership with Claire McDivitt, with whom he has two children. The studio's mascot, Gerald the dog, is a recurring symbol in his work.

== Awards and recognition ==
- Best in Show for Furniture Design, Liverpool Design Show.
- Runner-up, 2008 Grand Design Awards.
- Shortlisted, Arts Foundation Futures Awards 2019 (Designer-Makers category).
- Shortlisted, Independent Creative of the Year, Manchester Culture Awards (2025).
- 2020 Northern Powerhouse Export Champion.

His work has received coverage in publications such as DesignBoom, Wallpaper*, Creative Boom, JADED, and Manchester's Finest.
