= Justin Erasmus =

South African baseball player (born 1990)

- Pitcher
- Born: 22 January 1990 (age 36); Johannesburg, South Africa
- Bats: Right Throws: Right
- Stats at Baseball Reference

Justin Erasmus (born 22 January 1990) is a South African and Australian baseball pitcher who has played professionally in the United States, Australia, Germany, and the Netherlands. Erasmus was born in South Africa, then he grew up in Brisbane, Australia, where he started his baseball career and has represented both countries. He pitched in the 2009 World Baseball Classic for South Africa.

== Playing career ==
=== Boston Red Sox ===
Erasmus was signed by the Boston Red Sox as an international free agent in 2007. He spent 2009 and 2010 with the Gulf Coast League Red Sox. While in the Gulf Coast League, Erasmus kept his earned run average (ERA) to 2.09 while pitching over 56 innings. In Australia, he debuted for the Brisbane Bandits on 13 November 2010 against the Perth Heat. In six games, including three starts, he conceded a 6.38 ERA over 18 1/3 innings pitched in the hitter-friendly Australian Baseball League.

In 2011, Erasmus was promoted to the Greenville Drive in Low-A where he had a better 1.11 ERA over 40 2/3 innings. He returned to Greenville in 2012, but struggled to a 1–3 record and 9.24 ERA with 38 strikeouts and three saves over 26 games.

=== Joliet Slammers ===
Erasmus began the 2013 season with the Joliet Slammers of the independent Frontier League. In 27 appearances out of the bullpen, he posted a 3-2 record and 1.82 ERA with 21 strikeouts and 17 saves across 29 2/3 innings pitched.

=== Gateway Grizzlies ===
On August 17, 2013, Erasmus was traded to the Gateway Grizzlies of the Frontier League. In six appearances for Gateway, he recorded one win, five strikeouts, and three saves without allowing a run across 4 2/3 innings.

On February 18, 2014, Erasmus re-signed with the Grizzlies.

=== Fargo-Moorhead RedHawks ===
On May 23, 2014, Erasmus signed with the Fargo-Moorhead RedHawks of the American Association of Professional Baseball. In 25 appearances (two starts) for Fargo-Moorhead, he compiled a 2-2 record and 5.07 ERA with 38 strikeouts and two saves over 55 innings of work.

=== Schaumburg Boomers ===
Erasmus finished the 2014 season with the Schaumburg Boomers of the Frontier League. In eight appearances (two starts) for Schaumburg, he posted a 3-0 record and 4.21 ERA with 24 strikeouts and one save across 25 2/3 innings of work.

=== Oosterhout Twins ===
In 2016, Erasmus played for the Oosterhout Twins of the Honkbal Hoofdklasse. In five starts, he logged a 2–2 record and 0.55 ERA with 20 strikeouts across 32 2/3 innings pitched.

=== Baseball Bundesliga ===
Erasmus pitched for the Haar Disciples in the Baseball Bundesliga in part of the 2016 season. He joined Heidenheim Heideköpfe for the 2017 season, also serving as a pitching coach.

== International career ==
Erasmus was named to the South Africa national baseball team for the 2009 World Baseball Classic (WBC) where he started against Mexico, giving up an RBI double and two-run home run to Adrián González, finishing the tournament 0–1 with a 9.00 ERA.

His performance in 2011 earned him a call-up to the Australia national team for the 2011 Baseball World Cup, where he conceded one earned run over two innings, picking up the win against Germany.

Erasmus was named to the 2017 WBC roster for Australia, but he did not pitch in the tournament.

In 2026 WBC qualifiers with South Africa, Erasmus successfully executed a hidden ball trick against Nicaragua.

== Personal life ==
Erasmus's brother Bradley represented South Africa as a catcher in the 2006 World Baseball Classic.
