= Daniel Lamb-Hunt =

Auckland Tuatara – No. 15
- Utility infielder
- Born: 20 May 1987 (age 37); Auckland, New Zealand
- Bats: Right Throws: Right

ABL debut
- 19 November, 2010, for the Brisbane Bandits

ABL statistics (through 25 January 2020)
- Batting average: .232
- Runs batted in: 24
- Home runs: 2

Daniel Edward Lamb-Hunt (born 20 May 1987) is a New Zealand-German professional baseball player who plays as a utility infielder for the Auckland Tuatara in the Australian Baseball League and the Bonn Capitals in the German Bundesliga.

== Career ==
After growing up in Auckland and attending Mount Albert Grammar School, Lamb-Hunt began his career studying at the Major League Baseball Australian Academy Program and relocated to the Gold Coast, Queensland.

He was the first player of New Zealand heritage to play in the Australian Baseball League and is often credited as a rapidly progressing player, getting a relatively late start in baseball at age 17. In 2005, Lamb-Hunt was signed by the Atlanta Braves before being released. Like many New Zealand players, Lamb-Hunt made the crossover from softball.

He made his debut for the Brisbane Bandits on 19 November 2010 against the Sydney Blue Sox as the designated hitter, grounding out for an RBI before being pinch-hit for by Shayne Watson. Lamb-Hunt competed for the coveted Claxton Shield and played for the Bandits for two seasons.

In 2010 Lamb-Hunt concluded the season leading Germany's Baseball-Bundesliga 1st division. The utility infielder batted .411 with seven home runs, three triples, five doubles, 29 runs and 22 RBI in 28 games with the Pulheim Gophers, who re-signed him in 2011. In a repeat stellar performance, Lam-Hunt walked away from his second season, again, with best batter honours.

Lamb-Hunt has secured a following in Germany following his success in the Northern League, where he currently resides, playing now for the Bonn Capitals.

In 2018, Lamb-Hunt signed with the Auckland Tuatara of the Australian Baseball League, an expansion team based in his hometown of Auckland, New Zealand. Lamb-Hunt didn't join the team until January in the 2019–20 Australian Baseball League season staying in Germany to apply for citizenship.

== International career ==
He was selected to the New Zealand national baseball team at the 2013 World Baseball Classic Qualifier, 2017 World Baseball Classic Qualifier, and 2021 World Baseball Classic Qualifier.
