= Ben Wigmore =

Australian baseball player

Olympic medal record

Men's baseball
Silver medal – second place	Athens 2004	Team competition

Ben Wigmore (born 17 January 1982) is an Australian baseball player. He played for the Kensington Cardinals.

In 2004, he was part of the Australian Olympic baseball team, and achieved a silver medal in the baseball tournament at the Athens Olympics.
