= Lee Ingram =

English cricketer (born 1965)

Personal information
- Full name: Lee Royston Ingram
- Born: 10 November 1965 (age 61); Cambridge, Cambridgeshire, England
- Batting: Right-handed
- Bowling: Left-arm fast-medium

Domestic team information
- Years: Team
- 1999–2000: Huntingdonshire
- 1984: Cambridgeshire

Career statistics
Competition	LA
Matches	3
Runs scored	18
Batting average	9.00
100s/50s	–/-
Top score	13
Balls bowled	156
Wickets	3
Bowling average	33.00
5 wickets in innings	–
10 wickets in match	–
Best bowling	1/26
Catches/stumpings	1/-
- Source: Cricinfo, 7 July 2010

Lee Royston Ingram (born 10 January 1965) is a former English cricketer. Ingram was a right-handed batsman who bowled left-arm fast-medium. He was born at Cambridge, Cambridgeshire.

Ingram played a single Minor Counties Championship fixture for Cambridgeshire against Staffordshire in 1984.

In 1999 he made his List-A debut for Huntingdonshire against Bedfordshire in the 1st round of the 1999 NatWest Trophy. He played 2 further List-A matches for the county, firstly in the 1st round of the 2000 NatWest Trophy against a Hampshire Cricket Board side and lastly in the 2nd round of the same competition against a Yorkshire Cricket Board side. In his 3 List-A matches, he scored 18 runs at a batting average of 9.00 and a high score of 13. With the ball he took 3 wickets at a bowling average of 33.00, with best figures of 1/26.
