= 2009 Claxton Shield =

75th Claxton Shield Diamond Anniversary
- Sport: Baseball
- Defending champions: Perth Heat (2008)
- Duration: 2 December 2008 – 8 February 2009
- Teams: 5

Regular season
- First place: Perth Heat (12–4)
- Second place: Victoria Aces (10–6)
- Third place: New South Wales Patriots (9–7)
- Fourth place: Queensland Rams (8–8)
- Fifth place: South Australia (1–15)

Finals series
- Champions: Perth Heat (10th title)
- Runners-up: New South Wales Patriots

Seasons
- ← 2008 2010 →

The 2009 Diamond Anniversary Claxton Shield was the 75-year anniversary of the Claxton Shield and was held from 2 December 2008 to 8 February 2009 and was the Shield's Diamond anniversary. The Perth Heat won the tournament after defeating the New South Wales Patriots 3–2 in the third game of a best of three series. This historic tournament served as the final edition of the Claxton Shield as a standalone national competition before its integration into the newly formed Australian Baseball League (ABL) in 2010. The victory was particularly significant for Western Australian baseball, as it represented Perth's first Claxton Shield title since 2001 and demonstrated the growing parity among Australia's regional baseball programs.

== Overview ==
The 2009 Shield series excluded the Australian Provincial baseball team and consisted of four, three-game series against each team including a two home, two away and a bye round for each of the teams. On top of this to start off the tournament, there was also a showcase round where each team played each other once. To celebrate the 75th anniversary, the showcase round also hosted a variety of other events such as a Home Run Derby. Teams that competed in the 2009 Claxton Shield were the New South Wales Patriots, Queensland Rams, Perth Heat, Victoria Aces and the South Australia.

The competition served as the primary selection trial for the national team to compete in the 2009 World Baseball Classic. The first round of the WBC commenced Mexico City on 8 March 2009, a month after the final round.

== Teams ==
=== Venues ===
2009 Claxton Shield teams

The 2009 Claxton Shield will be competed between 5 teams from around Australia in 13 different venues.

- Perth Heat
  - Baseball Park – Perth
- South Australia
  - Anderson Reserve – Glenelg
  - Blue Lake Sports Park – Mount Gambier
- Victoria Aces
  - Melbourne Ballpark – Altona
  - Geelong Baseball Park – Geelong
  - Aerodrome Oval – Mildura
- New South Wales Patriots
  - Blacktown Baseball Stadium – Sydney
  - Narrabundah Baseball Park – Canberra
  - Aquatic Reserve – Manly
  - Fred Finch Park – Wollongong
- Queensland Rams
  - John Murray Field – Redlands
  - Holloway Field – Windsor
  - Baxter Field – Lismore

== Regular season ==
The regular season was held from 2 December 2008 through to 18 January 2009, followed by a two-week finals series from 23 January to 8 February 2009. The season started with a showcase round featuring all five teams in a single round-robin series of matches at Blacktown Olympic Park. This was followed by five rounds of home and away games, with each team playing four 3-game series, one against each other team, two at home and two away. As there was an odd number of teams, each team also had a bye round. At the end of the home and away season, the top three teams qualified for the finals series.

=== Standings ===
Clinched championship series berth
Clinched semi-final series berth

Team	W	L	Pct.	GB
Perth Heat	12	4	.750	–
Victoria Aces	10	6	.625	2
New South Wales Patriots	9	7	.563	3
Queensland Rams	8	8	.500	4
South Australia	1	15	.063	11

=== Showcase - Round 1 ===
2 December 2008 18:30 (UTC+11) Blacktown Olympic Park, Sydney
Team	1	2	3	4	5	6	7	8	9	R	H	E
Queensland Rams	0	1	0	2	0	2	1	2	0	8	12	0
Perth Heat	0	1	0	0	1	0	0	0	0	2	10	0
WP: C Mowday (1-0) LP: D Peacock (0-1) Sv: S Morriss (1); Home runs: QLD: J Naughton (1); Perth: N Kimpton (1), M Kennelly (1); Attendance: 151; Boxscore

3 December 2008 15:00 (UTC+11) Blacktown Olympic Park, Sydney (F/7)
Team	1	2	3	4	5	6	7	8	9	R	H	E
Victoria Aces	2	1	3	3	0	0	4			13	16	0
Queensland Rams	0	0	1	1	0	1	0			3	8	3
WP: A Blackley (1-0) LP: D Naylor (0-1); Home runs: VIC: D Berg (1); QLD: None; Boxscore

3 December 2008 18:30 (UTC+11) Blacktown Olympic Park, Sydney
Team	1	2	3	4	5	6	7	8	9	R	H	E
Perth Heat	5	0	0	0	0	2	0	0	0	7	9	0
South Australia	0	0	0	0	1	0	0	0	0	0	1	3
WP: M Kelly (1-0) LP: D Fidge (0-1); Home runs: Perth: L Dale (1); SA: None; Attendance: 198; Boxscore

4 December 2008 15:00 (UTC+11) Blacktown Olympic Park, Sydney (F/11)
Team	1	2	3	4	5	6	7	8	9	10	11	R	H	E
Perth Heat	1	0	0	2	1	1	0	0	0	0	1	6	15	1
Victoria Aces	2	0	1	0	0	1	0	0	1	0	0	5	10	3
WP: D White (1-0) LP: M Blackmore (0-1); Boxscore

4 December 2008 18:30 (UTC+11) Blacktown Olympic Park, Sydney
Team	1	2	3	4	5	6	7	8	9	R	H	E
South Australia	0	1	0	1	0	1	0	0	0	3	5	0
New South Wales Patriots	0	0	3	0	1	0	0	0	X	4	7	4
WP: V Harris (1-0) LP: P Brassington (0-1); Attendance: 587; Boxscore

5 December 2008 15:00 (UTC+11) Blacktown Olympic Park, Sydney
Team	1	2	3	4	5	6	7	8	9	R	H	E
South Australia	0	3	3	0	0	0	0	0	3	9	16	2
Queensland Rams	1	0	2	1	1	1	0	5	X	11	12	1
WP: S Morriss (1-0) LP: E Crabb (0-1); Home runs: SA: B Wigmore 2 (2); QLD: None; Boxscore

5 December 2008 19:00 (UTC+11) Blacktown Olympic Park, Sydney
Team	1	2	3	4	5	6	7	8	9	R	H	E
New South Wales Patriots	0	0	0	0	0	2	1	0	0	3	9	1
Perth Heat	0	0	0	1	2	0	0	0	1	4	11	1
WP: B Grice (1-0) LP: T Grattan (0-1); Home runs: NSW: None; Perth: M Graham (1), N Kimpton (2); Attendance: 483; Boxscore

6 December 2008 11:00 (UTC+11) Blacktown Olympic Park, Sydney
Team	1	2	3	4	5	6	7	8	9	R	H	E
Victoria Aces	2	0	0	3	2	1	0	0	0	8	14	1
South Australia	0	0	0	0	0	0	0	0	0	0	7	0
WP: D Hendricks (1-0) LP: T Fiebig (0-1); Boxscore

6 December 2008 19:30 (UTC+11) Blacktown Olympic Park, Sydney
Team	1	2	3	4	5	6	7	8	9	R	H	E
Queensland Rams	0	0	0	0	0	0	0	1	3	4	14	1
New South Wales Patriots	0	2	0	0	7	0	0	0	0	9	14	1
WP: T Cox (1-0) LP: C Mowday (1-1) Sv: M Bennett (1); Home runs: QLD: D Sutherland (1); NSW: T Atherton (1); Attendance: 1,002; Boxscore

7 December 2008 14:45 (UTC+11) Blacktown Olympic Park, Sydney (Note: Originally scheduled for 14:00 start. Delayed by 45 minutes due to storm.)
Team	1	2	3	4	5	6	7	8	9	R	H	E
New South Wales Patriots	0	0	0	1	0	0	0	0	0	1	9	0
Victoria Aces	0	3	1	0	1	5	0	0	X	10	14	0
WP: D Barker (1-0) LP: V Harris (1-1); Attendance: 276; Boxscore

Round 1 notes

=== Round 2 ===
13 December 2008 14:00 (UTC+11) Old Aerodrome Oval, Mildura (Note: Originally scheduled for 19:00, 12 December at Melbourne Ballpark. Re-scheduled to be first game of a doubleheader (7 innings) after a washout.)
Team	1	2	3	4	5	6	7	R	H	E
Queensland Rams	0	0	0	0	0	0	0	0	4	1
Victoria Aces	3	5	3	3	0	1	X	15	13	0
WP: A Blackley (2-0) LP: C Mowday (1-2); Home runs: QLD: None; VIC: P Rutgers (1), B Harman (1), D Berg (2), H Dingle (1), A Russell (1); Boxscore

13 December 2008 15:45 (UTC+11) Narrabundah Ballpark, Canberra (Note: Originally scheduled for 19:00, 12 December. Re-scheduled to be first game of a doubleheader (7 innings) after a washout.)
Team	1	2	3	4	5	6	7	R	H	E
Perth Heat	0	0	0	3	0	0	0	3	3	3
New South Wales Patriots	0	0	0	5	0	0	X	5	7	1
WP: W Lungren (1-0) LP: M Kelly (1-1) Sv: C Oxspring (1); Home runs: Perth: L Dale (2); NSW: None; Boxscore

13 December 2008 16:45 (UTC+11) Old Aerodrome Oval, Mildura (Note: Re-scheduled as a 7 inning game as part of the doubleheader.)
Team	1	2	3	4	5	6	7	R	H	E
Queensland Rams	0	0	0	1	0	7	1	9	14	1
Victoria Aces	4	0	1	4	0	0	1	10	12	3
WP: M Blackmore (1-1) LP: N Crawford (0-1); Home runs: QLD: B Roneberg (1), D Sutherland (2); VIC: D Berg (2), A Russell (2); Boxscore

13 December 2008 19:00 (UTC+11) Narrabundah Ballpark, Canberra
Team	1	2	3	4	5	6	7	R	H	E
Perth Heat	0	2	1	1	2	2	0	7	13	1
New South Wales Patriots	0	2	0	2	0	0	0	2	7	0
WP: D Peacock (1-1) LP: M Bennett (0-1); Home runs: Perth: T Kennelly (1); NSW: None; Boxscore

14 December 2008 11:00 (UTC+11) Old Aerodrome Oval, Mildura
Team	1	2	3	4	5	6	7	8	9	R	H	E
Queensland Rams	0	0	0	0	0	0	0	0	4	4	10	3
Victoria Aces	2	0	0	0	0	0	0	0	1	3	7	0
WP: M Timms (1-0) LP: B Cunningham (0-1) Sv: T Crawford (1); Home runs: QLD: D Sutherland (3); VIC: None; Boxscore

14 December 2008 13:00 (UTC+11) Fred Finch Park, Wollongong
Team	1	2	3	4	5	6	7	8	9	R	H	E
Perth Heat	0	0	0	1	3	4	0	0	0	8	11	3
New South Wales Patriots	0	1	6	0	2	0	2	0	X	11	13	3
WP: T Grattan (1-1) LP: L Hendriks (0-1) Sv: A Angelucci (1); Home runs: Perth: N Kimpton (3), M Kennelly (2), L Dale (3), D White (1); NSW: T Atherton (2), M Holland (1); Attendance: 300; Boxscore

Round 2 notes

=== Round 3 ===
19 December 2008 19:00 (UTC+10:30) Blue Lake Sports Park, Mount Gambier (F/10)
Team	1	2	3	4	5	6	7	8	9	10	R	H	E
Victoria Aces	1	0	0	0	1	0	0	0	0	1	3	6	3
South Australia	0	1	0	0	0	1	0	0	0	0	2	11	2
WP: M Blackmore (2-1) LP: J Ziersch (0-1); Home runs: VIC: None; SA: T Kennelly (2); Boxscore

19 December 2008 19:00 (UTC+8) Baseball Park, Perth
Team	1	2	3	4	5	6	7	8	9	R	H	E
Queensland Rams	0	0	0	1	0	0	0	2	0	3	4	2
Perth Heat	0	1	0	3	0	0	0	3	X	6	6	0
WP: M Kelly (2-1) LP: C Mowday (1-3) Sv: B Wise (1); Home runs: QLD: None; Perth: B Pett (1); Boxscore

20 December 2008 19:00 (UTC+10:30) Blue Lake Sports Park, Mount Gambier (F/7)
Team	1	2	3	4	5	6	7	8	9	R	H	E
Victoria Aces	3	0	0	0	1	7	1			12	11	1
South Australia	0	0	0	0	0	0	0			0	4	3
WP: A Blackley (3-0) LP: P Brassington (0-2); Boxscore

20 December 2008 19:00 (UTC+8) Baseball Park, Perth
Team	1	2	3	4	5	6	7	8	9	R	H	E
Queensland Rams	0	1	0	0	0	1	0	0	0	2	10	0
Perth Heat	0	0	3	0	1	1	1	0	X	4	12	2
WP: D Peacock (2-1) LP: R Searle (0-1) Sv: L Hendricks (1); Boxscore

21 December 2008 13:00 (UTC+10:30) Blue Lake Sports Park, Mount Gambier
Team	1	2	3	4	5	6	7	8	9	R	H	E
Victoria Aces	3	0	1	0	0	1	3	3	1	9	10	2
South Australia	0	0	0	0	2	0	0	0	1	3	3	0
WP: A Bright (1-0) LP: C Doyle (0-1) Sv: B Cunningham (1); Home runs: VIC: B Tamburrino (1); SA: S Welch (1); Boxscore

21 December 2008 18:00 (UTC+8) Baseball Park, Perth
Team	1	2	3	4	5	6	7	8	9	R	H	E
Queensland Rams	2	1	0	0	0	0	0	0	0	3	7	3
Perth Heat	0	0	0	2	2	1	1	1	X	6	7	2
WP: D Schmidt (1-0) LP: T Crawford (0-1) Sv: B Wise (2); Home runs: QLD: None; Perth: T Kennelly (3), L Dale (4); Boxscore

=== Round 4 ===
2 January 2009 19:00 (UTC+11) Albert Park, Lismore
Team	1	2	3	4	5	6	7	8	9	R	H	E
New South Wales Patriots	0	0	0	0	0	0	0	0	0	0	6	1
Queensland Rams	0	3	0	0	0	0	0	0	X	3	7	1
WP: C Mowday (2-3) LP: C Oxspring (0-1) Sv: R Searle (1); Boxscore

2 January 2009 15:00 (UTC+10:30) Anderson Reserve, Glenelg
Team	1	2	3	4	5	6	7	8	9	R	H	E
Perth Heat	1	0	0	0	0	0	1	0	0	2	8	4
South Australia	2	0	0	3	2	3	0	1	X	11	13	0
WP: D Fidge (1-1) LP: M Kelly (2-2) Sv: T Langmann (1); Home runs: Perth: N Kimpton (4), L Hughes (1); SA: S Welch (2), J Cresswell (1); Boxscore

3 January 2009 17:00 (UTC+11) Albert Park, Lismore
Team	1	2	3	4	5	6	7	8	9	R	H	E
New South Wales Patriots	0	0	0	0	1	0	0	1	0	2	7	1
Queensland Rams	3	0	0	0	0	0	0	0	X	3	7	2
WP: J Erasmus (1-0) LP: W Lundgren (0-1) Sv: R Searle (2); Home runs: NSW: None; QLD: M Collins (1); Boxscore

3 January 2009 15:00 (UTC+10:30) Anderson Reserve, Glenelg
Team	1	2	3	4	5	6	7	8	9	10	R	H	E
Perth Heat	1	0	0	0	0	1	1	4	2	3	11	15	3
South Australia	2	0	0	0	5	0	1	0	0	1	9	10	2
WP: D White (2-0) LP: J Ziersch (0-2) Sv: B Wise (3); Home runs: Perth: L Dale 2 (6), L Hughes (2); SA: S Welch 2 (4), J Cakebread (1); Boxscore

4 January 2009 13:00 (UTC+10) Holloway Field, Brisbane
Team	1	2	3	4	5	6	7	8	9	R	H	E
New South Wales Patriots	1	1	0	5	0	0	1	2	0	10	12	3
Queensland Rams	0	0	1	0	0	0	0	1	0	2	7	1
WP: T Cox (2-0) LP: C Naylor (0-1); Home runs: NSW: M Lysaught (1); QLD: M Collins (2); Boxscore

4 January 2009 13:00 (UTC+10:30) Anderson Reserve, Glenelg
Team	1	2	3	4	5	6	7	8	9	R	H	E
Perth Heat	1	0	0	0	2	4	0	2	7	16	16	1
South Australia	2	0	0	0	0	0	0	0	0	0	3	2
WP: L Hendricks (1-0) LP: M Ewart (0-1) Sv: D Schmidt (1); Home runs: Perth: N Kimpton (5), L Hughes 2 (4), L Dale (7); SA: None; Boxscore

=== Round 5 ===
==== 8 January 2009 at 7.00pm, Baseball Park ====
Team	1	2	3	4	5	6	7	8	9	R	H	E
Victoria Aces	0	1	3	1	0	0	1	1	0	7	11	2
Perth Heat	3	4	0	0	1	0	0	0	0	8	9	3
WP: T Murphy (1-0) LP: A Blackley (3-1) Sv: B Wise (4); Home runs: VIC: P Weichard (1); Perth: L Hughes (5) Attendance:

==== 9 January 2009 at 7.00pm, Blacktown Baseball Stadium ====
Team	1	2	3	4	5	6	7	8	9	R	H	E
South Australia	0	0	0	0	0	0	0	0	0	0	1	0
New South Wales Patriots	0	2	0	0	0	1	0	0	X	3	7	3
WP: W Lundgren (2-1) LP: D Fidge (1-2); Home runs: SA: None; NSW: Attendance:

==== 9 January 2009 at 7.00pm, Baseball Park ====
Team	1	2	3	4	5	6	7	8	9	R	H	E
Victoria Aces	1	1	0	0	0	0	1	0	0	3	6	2
Perth Heat	0	0	0	0	0	0	0	4	0	4	8	1
WP: W Saupold (1-0) LP: M Blackmore (2-2) Sv: B Grice (1); Home runs: VIC: P Weichard (2); Perth: Attendance:

==== 10 January 2009 at 7.00pm, Blacktown Baseball Stadium ====
Team	1	2	3	4	5	6	7	R	H	E
South Australia	0	0	0	0	0	0	0	0	2	4
New South Wales Patriots	0	2	5	5	1	0	X	11	10	0
WP: T Cox (3-0) LP: P Brassington (0-3); Home runs: SA: None; NSW: Attendance:

== Championship series ==
The 2009 Claxton Shield finals series will have the top three teams after regular fixtures qualify. The team who finishes first will auto-qualify for the final where they will meet the winner of the 2nd vs 3rd. Both semi-finals and finals are best of three series.

=== 23 January 2009 at 7.00 pm, Melbourne Ballpark ===
Team	1	2	3	4	5	6	7	8	9	R	H	E
NSW Patriots	0	0	0	0	1	0	0	0	0	1	1	2
Victoria Aces	2	3	1	1	0	0	0	0	X	7	10	0
Starting pitchers: Patriots: W Lundgren; Aces: T Blackley; WP: T Blackley (1-0) LP: W Lundgren (0-1); Home runs: Patriots: 0 Aces: 0 Attendance: 737

=== 24 January 2009 at 3.00 pm, Waverley ===
Team	1	2	3	4	5	6	7	8	9	R	H	E
Victoria Aces	0	0	0	0	1	0	0	0	0	0	6	6
NSW Patriots	3	0	0	0	0	3	1	2	X	9	8	0
Starting pitchers: Aces: A Blackley; Patriots: T Cox; WP: T Cox (1-0) LP: A Blackley (0-1); Home runs: Aces: 0 Patriots: 2, M Lysaught, S Pender Attendance: 1731

=== 25 January 2009 at 12.00 pm, Melbourne Ballpark ===
Team	1	2	3	4	5	6	7	8	9	R	H	E
NSW Patriots	0	0	0	0	3	0	0	0	2	5	9	0
Victoria Aces	0	0	0	0	0	0	0	0	0	0	6	1
Starting pitchers: Patriots: C Anderson; Aces: D Cassidy; WP: C Anderson (1-0) LP: D Cassidy (0-1) Sv: W Lundgren 1 Home runs: Patriots: 1, S Pender; Aces: 0 Attendance: 154

=== 6 February 2009 at 7.00 pm, Baseball Park ===
Team	1	2	3	4	5	6	7	8	9	R	H	E
NSW Patriots	2	0	0	2	0	1	0	0	0	5	5	2
Perth Heat	0	0	0	0	2	0	0	1	0	3	8	1
Starting pitchers: Patriots: C Anderson; Heat: L Hendriks; WP: C Anderson (2-0) LP: L Hendriks (0-1) Sv: W Lundgren 2 Home runs: Patriots: 0 Heat: 0 Attendance:

=== 7 February 2009 at 7.00 pm, Baseball Park ===
Perth Heat def. New South Wales Patriots.

=== 8 February 2009 at 7.30 pm, Baseball Park ===
Team	1	2	3	4	5	6	7	8	9	R	H	E
NSW Patriots	0	0	0	0	0	0	0	0	2	2	5	1
Perth Heat	0	0	0	2	0	0	0	0	1	3	9	2
Starting pitchers: Patriots: W Lundgren; Heat: D Schmidt; WP: B Wise (1-0) LP: M Williams (0-1) Sv: W Lundgren 2 Home runs: Patriots: 0 Heat: 1, C House Attendance: 2150

== Conditions ==
Blacktown Baseball Stadium experienced quite warm December summer weather for New South Wales. Although the average maximum temperature is 25 °C (77 °F), most games were above this, with Game 8 of the showcase round between South Australia and Victoria Aces hitting 32 °C (90 °F) during the match.

On 7 December, the temperature dropped to a maximum of 22 °C with a strong breeze over Blacktown as well as clouds, however, no rain fell and the games finished as scheduled.

A large low-pressure system and long periods of rain forced the postponement of both games on 12 December in Altona, Victoria and Canberra. Games the next day were rescheduled to allow for 7-inning double headers. Game 1 between Queensland Rams and Victoria Aces was relocated to Mildura, Victoria where Game 2 and 3 were also being played.

On 3 January, the New South Wales Patriots vs Queensland Rams second game at Baxter Field, Lismore was delayed during the 6th inning due to a small stint of heavy rain. Drizzle was present throughout the game, but was only delayed for approximately ten minutes.

== Fielders Choice Player of the Series ==
This is awarded recognition of outstanding individual performances each round of the 2009 Claxton Shield by the Australian Baseball Federation.

- Round 1 – Nick Kimpton
- Round 2 – Daniel Berg
- Round 3 – Tim Kennelly
- Round 4 – Luke Hughes
- Round 5 – Wayne Lundgren
- Round 6 – Justin Huber

== Statistics leaders ==
Defensive Stats*
Name	Wins	Losses	Saves	ERA
Tim COX	3	0	0	0.00
Wayne LUNDGREN	3	1	0	2.27
Darryn CASSIDY	1	0	0	2.52
Liam HENDRIKS	3	1	0	2.70
Mark KELLY	2	2	0	3.72

Offensive Stars*
Name	Avg	HR	RBI
Nick KIMPTON	.500	5	23
Wade DUTTON	.425	0	5
Brad DUTTON	.393	0	8
David KANDILAS	.370	0	5
Christopher HOUSE	.356	0	8

== Awards ==
Award	Name	Team
Championship MVP	Luke Hughes	Perth Heat
Golden Glove	Grant Karlsen	Victoria Aces
Batting Champion	Nick Kimpton	Perth Heat
Pitcher of the Year	Tim Cox	New South Wales Patriots
Rookie of the Year	Chris House	Perth Heat
Manager of the Year	Don Kyle	Perth Heat
