= Gary White (baseball) =

Australian baseball player

Personal information
- Born: 8 December 1967 (age 57); Brisbane, Queensland, Australia

Sport
- Country: Australia
- Sport: Baseball

Gary White (born 8 December 1967 in Sydney), is an Australian baseball player. He competed at the 2000 Summer Olympics.
