= Holloway Field =

Baseball stadium in Newmarket, Queensland

- Holloway Field shortly after installation of lights
- Interactive map of Holloway Field
- Former names: Spencer Park
- Location: Spencer Park, Market Street, Newmarket, Queensland
- Coordinates: 27°26′19″S 153°0′40″E
- Owner: Queensland Government
- Capacity: 1500 seated
- Surface: Grass
- Field size: Left Field – 335 feet (102 m); Center Field – 358 feet (109 m); Right Field – 315 feet (96 m)

Construction
- Opened: 10 May 1964
- Renovated: 1982, 1984
- Expanded: 1986

Tenants
- Windsor Royals; Netherlands National Baseball Team; Claxton Shield; Brisbane Bandits (2013–current)

Holloway Field (officially Viticon Stadium, formerly Onehub Stadium, powered by Optus) is a baseball stadium in Newmarket, Brisbane, Queensland, Australia. It is the home to the Brisbane Bandits of the Australian Baseball League and Windsor Royals baseball club.

== Background ==
After the formation of the Windsor Royals in 1955, the club looked for a permanent site to play baseball. Originally, Crosby Park in Albion was planned to be the new ground for the Royals, but was rejected by the Brisbane City Council. In 1964, the club was approved to break ground for a stadium at Spencer Park in Newmarket. On 10 May 1964, the ground was officially named Holloway Field after the Windsor fFoundationand life member, Stan Holloway. It was expanded and renovated in 1986 and again was refurbished to accommodate the Brisbane Bandits home Australian Baseball League fixtures after they moved from the Brisbane Exhibition Ground for the 2013–14 season.

The field itself is a fully fenced and regulation-size field with covered sunken dugouts, two bullpens, two battery cages, two officials' boxes, a scorers' box and seating for 1500. Floodlighting was added on 24 September 1982 and a sprinkler system two years later. It was prior to the 2000 Summer Olympics the training camp of the Netherlands national baseball team and has hosted a variety of international baseball matches, including the World Master Games. It was the home ground of the Queensland Rams for Claxton Shield games prior to the reformation of the ABL.

With the arrival of the Brisbane Bandits for the 2013–14 season also came upgrades to the ballpark. A new brick backstop, new backstop netting, seating added to the tiered grandstands as well as a refurbished infield. A progressive replacement plan for the lighting towers was implemented to bring Holloway Field up to the highest standard for night games. After the completion of the Major League Baseball Opening Series at the Sydney Cricket Ground in 2014, the foul poles that were fabricated for the event were relocated to Brisbane and erected at Holloway Field prior to the 2014–15 Australian Baseball League season.
