= Joel Naughton =

Australian catcher

Brisbane Bandits
- Catcher
- Born: 27 August 1986 (age 39); Brisbane, Australia
- Bats: Left Throws: Right

ABL debut
- 11 November, 2010, for the Brisbane Bandits
- Stats at Baseball Reference

Joel Matthew Naughton (born 27 August 1986) is an Australian catcher for the Brisbane Bandits.

== Professional career ==
=== Philadelphia Phillies ===
Naughton made his professional debut in 2005 with the Rookie-Level Gulf Coast League Phillies. He batted .275 with three doubles, one home run and 11 RBIs in 29 games.

In 2006 Naughton spent the season with Class-A Short-Season Batavia Muckdogs. He hit safely in 19 of 23 games from 17 July to 26 August.

He spent the 2007 season with Class-A Lakewood BlueClaws. He hit safely in his first seven games of the season going 9-for-23. He also hit safely in nine straight games from 30 June to 15 July batting .351.

Naughton spent the season with Class-A Lakewood. He was named a South Atlantic League midseason All-Star. He ended the season hitting safely in six straight games going 13-for-26. Naughton had 19 multi-hit games, including four with three-plus hits. He also hit .307 with 12 RBIs in the seventh inning or later.

With the Class-A Advanced Clearwater Threshers in 2009 he hit .240 with seven home runs 37 RBIs in 82 games. In 2010, he made a fa improved .308 with the Threshers, slugging .429. However, Joel was hampered by an arm injury towards the end of the season and although he debuted for the Brisbane Bandits in the Australian Baseball League on 11 November, he only played four more games as he underwent surgery to be fit for the 2011 spring training.

He played in 2011 spring training for the Phillies and delivered a game-winning hit in one of the games. He was promoted briefly to AAA in May then was returned to High A. He requested his release and left the Phillies on 13 June 2011.

== Personal life ==
Joel was a graduated from Grace Lutheran College in 2003 and played for the Pine Hills Lightning in the Greater Brisbane League.
