= 1948 Claxton Shield =

1948 Australian Carnival 1948 Interstate Carnival
- 1948

Tournament information
- Date: 7 – 14 August
- Host(s): (Western Australia) Perth, WA
- Teams: 4
- Defending champions: Victoria

Final positions
- Champion: Victoria (2nd title)
- 1st runner-up: South Australia
- 2nd runner-up: New South Wales

The 1948 Claxton Shield (at the time known as either the 1948 Australian Carnival or the 1948 Interstate Carnival) was the ninth annual Claxton Shield, an Australian national baseball tournament. It was held in Perth, Western Australia from 7 to 14 August, and was won by Victoria for the second time overall, successfully defending their title from 1947. The other participants were South Australia, New South Wales, and hosts Western Australia.

== Format ==
As had been the case in all previous tournaments where there had been four teams, each team played a round-robin schedule, meeting each other team once, with two competition points were on offer in each game. The points were awarded as follows:

- Win – two points
- Tie – one point
- Loss – no points

At the end of these preliminary games, the top two teams played each other to determine the champions, while the remaining two teams faced each other to determine third place.

== Results ==
=== Preliminaries ===
Team	Points	Wins	Ties	Losses
Victoria	5	2	1	–
South Australia	4	2	–	1
New South Wales	2	1	–	2
Western Australia	1	–	1	2

7 August 1948	South Australia	4 – 1	New South Wales	(Western Australia) Perth, WA

7 August 1948	Western Australia	1 – 1	Victoria	(Western Australia) Perth, WA

9 August 1948	New South Wales	1 – 0	Western Australia	(Western Australia) Perth, WA

9 August 1948	Victoria	2 – 1	South Australia	(Western Australia) Perth, WA

11 August 1948	Victoria	8 – 1	New South Wales	(Western Australia) Perth, WA

11 August 1948	South Australia	5 – 0	Western Australia	(Western Australia) Perth, WA

=== Finals ===
==== Third place final ====
14 August 1948	New South Wales	2 – 1	Western Australia	(Western Australia) Perth, WA

==== Championship game ====
14 August 1948	Victoria	3 – 2	South Australia	(Western Australia) Perth, WA

1948 Claxton Shield Champions

Victoria
2nd title

== All-Australian team ==
At the conclusion of the tournament, representatives from the Australian Baseball Council selected an All-Australian team. It was the fourth such Australian team selected at the end of a Claxton Shield tournament.

Position	Player
Pitcher	(New South Wales) R. Lawler
Pitcher	(Western Australia) C. Puckett
Catcher	(South Australia) P. Brideoake (c)
Catcher	(Victoria (state)) W. Anderson
First Base	(Victoria (state)) R. Straw
Second Base	(New South Wales) C. Emmerick
Third Base	(New South Wales) M. Deigan
Short Stop	(Victoria (state)) R. Harvey
Outfielders	(Victoria (state)) R. Black
Outfielders	(Victoria (state)) W. Driver
Outfielders	(New South Wales) J. Rowley
Utility	(Western Australia) G. Dickinson
Manager	(South Australia) R. C. Scott

== Bibliography ==
- Clark, Joe (2003). A History of Australian Baseball: Time and Game. Lincoln, NE, United States: University of Nebraska Press. ISBN 0-8032-6440-2.
- Harris, John O. (2009). Baseball Queensland 1905-1990. Archived from the original on 6 July 2011.
