= 1947 Claxton Shield =

Australian Interstate Baseball Carnival
- 1947

Tournament information
- Date: 2 – 9 August
- Host(s): (South Australia) Adelaide, SA
- Teams: 4
- Defending champions: New South Wales

Final positions
- Champion: Victoria (1st title)
- 1st runner-up: South Australia
- 2nd runner-up: New South Wales

The 1947 Claxton Shield was the eighth annual Claxton Shield, an Australian national baseball tournament. It was held at the Adelaide Oval in Adelaide from 2 to 9 August and was won by Victoria for the first time. The other participating teams were defending champions New South Wales, hosts South Australia and the returning Western Australian team.

== Format ==
With the return of Western Australia to the tournament, the four teams played a round-robin schedule, meeting each other team once, with two competition points were on offer in each game. The points were awarded as follows:

- Win – two points
- Tie – one point
- Loss – no points

At the end of these preliminary games, the top two teams played each other to determine the champions.

== Results ==
=== Preliminaries ===
Team	Points	Wins	Ties	Losses
South Australia	8	4	-	-
Victoria	6	3	-	1
New South Wales	2	1	-	3
Western Australia	0	-	-	4

2 August 1947	Victoria	4 – 3	Western Australia	(South Australia) Adelaide Oval

2 August 1947	South Australia	4 – 3	New South Wales	(South Australia) Adelaide Oval

4 August 1947	New South Wales	4 – 2	Western Australia	(South Australia) Adelaide Oval

4 August 1947	South Australia	4 – 0	Victoria	(South Australia) Adelaide Oval

6 August 1947	South Australia	4 – 0	Western Australia	(South Australia) Adelaide Oval

6 August 1947	Victoria	6 – 1	New South Wales	(South Australia) Adelaide Oval

8 August 1947	Victoria	4 – 1	Western Australia	(South Australia) Adelaide Oval

8 August 1947	South Australia	3 – 0	New South Wales	(South Australia) Adelaide Oval

=== Final ===
9 August 1947	Victoria	4 – 0	South Australia	(South Australia) Adelaide Oval

1947 Claxton Shield Champions

Victoria
1st title

== All-Australian team ==
At the conclusion of the tournament, representatives from the Australian Baseball Council selected an All-Australian team. It was the third such Australian team selected at the end of a Claxton Shield tournament. South Australian players made up the largest proportion in the squad, despite not being the champion team of the year, while champions Victoria had only two players selected: the smallest from any team, along with Western Australia.

Position		Player
Pitcher		(South Australia) D. Vaughan
Catcher		(South Australia) P. Brideoake
First Base		(Victoria (state)) R. Straw
Second Base		(New South Wales) T. Geegan
Third Base		(New South Wales) M. Deigan
Short Stop		(South Australia) R. Brealy
Left Field		(Victoria (state)) R. Black
Centre Field		(South Australia) W. Radbone
Right Field		(New South Wales) J. Rowley
Reserve Battery	Pitcher	(South Australia) B. Dooland
Reserve Battery	Catcher	(Western Australia) T. Nisbet
Utility		(Western Australia) C. Dickinson (c)

== Bibliography ==
- Clark, Joe (2003). A History of Australian Baseball: Time and Game. Lincoln, NE, United States: University of Nebraska Press. ISBN 0-8032-6440-2.
