= 2010–11 Australian Baseball League season =

- League: Australian Baseball League
- Sport: Baseball
- Duration: 6 November 2010 – 13 February 2011
- Games: 132
- Teams: 6

Regular season
- Season MVP: James McOwen (ADE)

Championship Series
- Venue: Baseball Park
- Champions: Perth Heat (1st title)
- Runners-up: Adelaide Bite

Seasons
- 2011–12 →

The 2010–11 Australian Baseball League season was the inaugural Australian Baseball League (ABL) season, and was held from 6 November 2010 to 13 February 2011. It came 12 years after the old Australian Baseball League ceased and is the successor of the mostly amateur Claxton Shield competition that has been played since 1934. The season consisted of six teams competing in a 40-game schedule, followed by a three-round finals series to determine the ABL champion.

At the conclusion of the regular season, the Sydney Blue Sox, Perth Heat, Adelaide Bite and Melbourne Aces progressed to the finals series, while the Brisbane Bandits and Canberra Cavalry were only eliminated from contention on the final day of the season. Both Melbourne and Sydney were eliminated by Adelaide in the minor semi-final series and the preliminary final series, respectively. Perth became the inaugural ABL champions when they defeated Adelaide two games to one in the championship series.

== Formation ==
In June 2009, it was announced that the rights to the Claxton Shield had been sold to a new Australian Baseball League, with ownership split between Major League Baseball's 75 percent share and the 25 percent share owned by the Australian Baseball Federation. The 2010 Claxton Shield tournament was considered preparation for the inaugural ABL season.

Although initial reports suggested that between eight and ten teams would contest the first season, including the possibility of a team based in New Zealand, six teams representing Adelaide, Brisbane, Canberra, Melbourne, Perth and Sydney were announced in November 2009 as the foundation clubs.

Compared to the previous season's Claxton Shield tournament, there were few structural changes to the competition. With the expansion from five to six teams, the need for teams to have a bye was eliminated, with all teams participating in games each round. The individual rounds were expanded from three to four games per round, resulting in an increase from 24 to 40 games per team for the season. The postseason was also expanded to include the top four teams, rather than only the top three.

== Teams ==

=== Rosters ===
During the season each team made use of a 22-man active roster, drawn from 35-man squads announced on 28 October 2010.

=== Venues ===
Four of the six teams used their existing venues from the Claxton Shield: the Adelaide Bite, Perth Heat and Sydney Blue Sox all used the same grounds used in the 2010 Claxton Shield by the respective state teams, and the Canberra Cavalry used the same venue used by Australia Provincial when they last contested the Claxton Shield in 2008: Narrabundah Ballpark.

The Melbourne Aces played at the Melbourne Showgrounds, after the Victorian state government announced a A$300,000 upgrade of the grounds. Similarly the Queensland state government announced a A$300,000 upgrade of the Brisbane Exhibition Ground for use by the Brisbane Bandits as their home field.

Team	City	State	Stadium	Ref
Adelaide Bite	Adelaide	South Australia	Coopers Stadium	
Brisbane Bandits	Brisbane	Queensland	Brisbane Exhibition Ground	
Canberra Cavalry	Canberra	Australian Capital Territory	Narrabundah Ballpark	
Melbourne Aces	Melbourne	Victoria	Melbourne Showgrounds	
Perth Heat	Perth	Western Australia	Baseball Park	
Sydney Blue Sox	Sydney	New South Wales	Blacktown Olympic Park	

== Regular season ==
The Australian Baseball League logo.

The regular season was held from 6 November 2010 through to 22 January 2011. All six teams competed in a double round-robin format, playing each other team in two series of four games each, totalling 40 games played each. The top four teams progressed to the postseason. The winner of the championship series will be awarded the Claxton Shield.

At the end of the regular season, the Sydney Blue Sox finished in first place with a 24–15 win–loss record. Half a game behind Sydney were the Perth Heat in second place. The third place team was the Adelaide Bite a further game behind. The Melbourne Aces finished in fourth place six games behind the Blue Sox. The Brisbane Bandits and Canberra Cavalry, who played only 36 games due to 2010–11 Queensland floods, finished in fifth and sixth place, eight and a half and ten and a half games behind the leader respectively.

=== Standings ===
2010–11 regular season standings
Team	Pld	HW	HL	AW	AL	GB	PCT	Qualification
Sydney Blue Sox	39	12	7	12	8	—	.615 (Note: The third game played between Sydney and Melbourne in round 4 was called a tie with a score of 1–1 under ABL rule 5-6-8. The result is not counted towards the teams' standings. A game postponed from round 4, held in round 5, was played with the Melbourne Aces as the away team and the Sydney Blue Sox as the home team, despite being played at the Melbourne Showgrounds.)	Major semi final berth
Perth Heat	40	10	10	14	6	0.5	.600	Major semi final berth
Adelaide Bite	40	15	5	8	12	1.5	.575 (Note: A game postponed from round 4, held in round 7, was played with the Adelaide Bite as the away team and the Canberra Cavalry as the home team, despite being played at Coopers Stadium, Adelaide.) (Note: Two games postponed from round 5, held in round 10, were played with the Adelaide Bite as the away team and the Brisbane Bandits as the home team, despite being played at Coopers Stadium, Adelaide.)	Minor semi final berth
Melbourne Aces	39	11	9	7	12	6	.462	Minor semi final berth
Brisbane Bandits	36	6	10	8	12	8.5	.389	
Canberra Cavalry	36	11	9	1	15	10.5	.333	

=== Opening night ===
The season started on 6 November 2010, when the Sydney Blue Sox hosted the Canberra Cavalry at Blacktown Olympic Park. The Blue Sox won the inaugural game of the league, defeating the Cavalry 1–0. In what was effectively a pitchers' duel, Blue Sox starting pitcher Chris Oxspring was the stand-out performer for the night, having scattered 3 hits and 1 walk over 6 innings and striking out 8. The Cavalry, however, opted to use several pitchers, each throwing two complete innings.

Sydney left fielder Tim Auty registered the league's first hit of the season in the bottom of the first with a line drive single to centre field. Canberra did not register a hit until the fourth inning to see their first baserunner when third baseman Kyu-Hyun Moon singled to right field.

The game had been scoreless through the first seven innings, despite Sydney loading the bases in the bottom of the sixth against reliever Lee Jung-Min: right fielder David Kandilas walked to lead off the inning, and was followed by third baseman Trent D'Antonio with a single to left field. Auty hit a sacrifice bunt to move both runners over, leading the Cavalry to intentionally walk centre fielder Mitch Dening. The Blue Sox were unable to capitalise on the opportunity, when designated hitter Patrick Maat struck out and catcher Andrew Graham grounded out.

Sydney scored the only run of the night in the eighth inning against reliever Heo Jun-Hyeok. With two out, Auty singled to left field for his second hit of the night, then stole second base. He was then driven in by Dening, who singled to centre field. Dening also stole second, but was stranded there at the end of the inning. In the top of the ninth, relievers Matthew Williams and Koo Dae-Sung combined to close the game out, earning a hold and save respectively.

6 November 2010 19:30 (UTC+11:00) at Blacktown Olympic Park, Sydney
Team	1	2	3	4	5	6	7	8	9	R	H	E
Canberra	0	0	0	0	0	0	0	0	0	0	3	0
Sydney	0	0	0	0	0	0	0	1	X	1	4	0
WP: Wayne Lundgren (1–0) LP: Heo Jun-Hyeok (0–1) Sv: Koo Dae-Sung (1); Attendance: 1,427; Boxscore

=== Round 1 ===
The Melbourne Aces played the Adelaide Bite at Coopers Stadium in Adelaide, the Perth Heat played against the Brisbane Bandits at the Brisbane Exhibition Ground, and the Sydney Blue Sox and Canberra Cavalry continued their series at Blacktown Olympic Park for the first round of the season.

==== Adelaide v Melbourne ====
The Adelaide Bite won its opening game for the season, defeating the Melbourne Aces 9–1, in large part due to the Paul Mildren's pitching and Ben Wigmore's hitting. Mildren pitched 7 scoreless innings, allowing 6 hits and struck out 5, while Wigmore went 4–for–5 with a double, a home run and 5 runs batted in. Despite scoring first in the second inning through back-to-back doubles from Grant Karlsen and Itaru Hashimoto, the Aces lost the second game of the series 7–4. the Bite's starting pitcher Darren Fidge was once again the standout; he pitched 8 innings and allowed 3 runs on 3 hits and 3 walks, and struck out 7. Quincy Latimore went 4–for–8 over the two games of the doubleheader; he hit a 3-run home run in the first inning and took a catch at the left field wall in the fifth inning of game one to help Adelaide to a 13–2 win, then hit two more home runs in the second game where Adelaide won 8–3 to complete the series sweep.

11 November 2010 19:00 (UTC+10:30) at Coopers Stadium, Adelaide
Team	1	2	3	4	5	6	7	8	9	R	H	E
Melbourne	0	0	0	0	0	0	0	1	0	1	8	4
Adelaide	0	1	0	4	0	1	1	2	X	9	12	4
WP: Paul Mildren (1–0) LP: Adam Blackley (0–1); Home runs: MEL: None; ADE: Ben Wigmore (1); Attendance: 1,795; Boxscore

12 November 2010 19:00 (UTC+10:30) at Coopers Stadium, Adelaide
Team	1	2	3	4	5	6	7	8	9	R	H	E
Melbourne	0	3	0	0	0	0	0	0	1	4	5	3
Adelaide	0	0	2	3	2	0	0	0	X	7	6	1
WP: Darren Fidge (1–0) LP: Norihito Kaneto (0–1); Home runs: MEL: Justin Huber (1); ADE: Ben Wigmore (2); Attendance: 1,538; Boxscore

13 November 2010 16:00 (UTC+10:30) at Coopers Stadium, Adelaide
Team	1	2	3	4	5	6	7	R	H	E
Melbourne	0	1	1	0	0	0	0	2	4	3
Adelaide	3	0	0	2	5	3	X	13	13	0
WP: Ryan Murphy (1–0) LP: Brad Hertzler (0–1); Home runs: MEL: None; ADE: Quincy Latimore (1); Notes: Scheduled as 7 innings. The first game of a doubleheader. Boxscore

13 November 2010 19:00 (UTC+10:30) at Coopers Stadium, Adelaide
Team	1	2	3	4	5	6	7	8	9	R	H	E
Melbourne	0	0	0	0	0	0	1	2	0	3	10	2
Adelaide	0	0	0	3	0	1	2	2	X	8	10	0
WP: Dushan Ruzic (1–0) LP: Donavon Hendricks (0–1); Home runs: MEL: None; ADE: Quincy Latimore 2 (3); Notes: The second game of a doubleheader. Boxscore

==== Brisbane v Perth ====
The Brisbane Bandits and the Perth Heat opened their seasons in Brisbane. The ceremonial first pitch was thrown by Graeme Lloyd and caught by the Bandits' manager Dave Nilsson; the only all-Australian battery to appear in a Major League Baseball game and both Baseball Australia Hall of Fame inductees in their own right. Despite Robbie Widlansky's two extra base hits and his scoring two runs, Perth was unable to take the lead at any point in the game. Brisbane's Wade Dutton, Shuhei Fukuda, Alan Schoenberger, and Joel Naughton each had multi-hit games to help the Bandits to an 8–3 win. Widlansky was a key player for the Heat again in the second game, which Perth won 2–0, opening the scoring with a solo home run. Daniel Schmidt was the other key player; he was the starting pitcher and pitched 8 innings, allowing no runs on 5 hits and striking out 8 Bandits. Perth also won both games of the doubleheader—4–2 in the day game and 4–1 in the night game—to win its opening series. In the day game Brandon Dale went 3–for–4 with a double and a run batted in, and Luke Hughes went 1–for–2 scoring 2 runs, including scoring a run from his lead-off triple in the fifth inning. Heat pitchers Warwick Saupold, Tyler Anderson, Robert Sorensen, and Liam Hendriks combined to keep the Bandits to 1 run on 7 hits, striking out 11 Brisbane hitters.

11 November 2010 19:00 (UTC+10:00) at Brisbane Exhibition Ground
Team	1	2	3	4	5	6	7	8	9	R	H	E
Perth	0	0	1	0	0	1	1	0	0	3	7	4
Brisbane	1	0	1	0	0	1	1	4	X	8	13	2
WP: Chris Mowday (1–0) LP: Dean White (0–1) Sv: Simon Morriss (1); Attendance: 1,551; Boxscore

12 November 2010 19:00 (UTC+10:00) at Brisbane Exhibition Ground
Team	1	2	3	4	5	6	7	8	9	R	H	E
Perth	1	0	0	1	0	0	0	0	0	2	6	1
Brisbane	0	0	0	0	0	0	0	0	0	0	4	1
WP: Daniel Schmidt (1–0) LP: Hiroki Yamada (0–1) Sv: Liam Hendriks (1); Home runs: PER: Robbie Widlansky (1); BRI: None; Attendance: 1,151; Boxscore

13 November 2010 16:30 (UTC+10:00) at Brisbane Exhibition Ground
Team	1	2	3	4	5	6	7	R	H	E
Perth	0	0	1	0	1	1	1	4	8	0
Brisbane	1	0	1	0	0	0	0	2	5	3
WP: Cameron Lamb (1–0) LP: Chris Mowday (1–1) Sv: Brett Jacobson (1); Attendance: 1,450; Notes: Scheduled as 7 innings. The first game of a doubleheader. Boxscore

13 November 2010 19:00 (UTC+10:00) at Brisbane Exhibition Ground
Team	1	2	3	4	5	6	7	8	9	R	H	E
Perth	0	0	0	1	1	1	0	1	0	4	6	1
Brisbane	0	0	0	0	0	0	1	0	0	1	7	1
WP: Warwick Saupold (1–0) LP: Ryan Searle (0–1) Sv: Liam Hendriks (1); Attendance: 1,450; Notes: The second game of a doubleheader. Boxscore

==== Sydney v Canberra ====
Six days after the opening night of the season Sydney and Canberra continued their series at Blacktown Olympic Park. Three of the Blue Sox's key players from that opening night gave repeat performances to defeat the Cavalry 4–2: Chris Oxspring was the starting pitcher for Sydney and pitched 8 innings, having allowed 2 runs on 4 hits and struck out 7 to earn the win; Koo Dae-Sung retired the three Cavalry hitters he faced for a scoreless ninth inning to earn the save; Mitch Dening hit a ground rule double with the bases loaded to drive in the go-ahead run in the bottom of the fifth inning. In the first game of the season to be called early as a result of the league's run differential rule, Sydney comfortably beat Canberra 13–3. Though the Blue Sox combined to hit 7–for–17 with runners in scoring position and 7 runs driven in with two out, they were aided by 2 wild pitches by Cavalry pitchers, 3 passed balls by catcher Michael Collins, and 4 errors in the field, resulting in only 3 of the 13 runs scored by the Blue Sox being earned. Alex Johnson's 3-run home run in the bottom of the seventh inning was the difference in the final game of the series, helping Sydney to a 7–5 win and to sweep Canberra 4–0 in the series.

12 November 2010 19:30 (UTC+11:00) at Blacktown Olympic Park, Sydney
Team	1	2	3	4	5	6	7	8	9	R	H	E
Canberra	0	0	0	2	0	0	0	0	0	2	4	0
Sydney	0	0	1	0	3	0	0	0	X	4	9	0
WP: Chris Oxspring (1–0) LP: Heo Jun-Hyeok (0–2) Sv: Koo Dae-Sung (2); Home runs: CAN: Nick Kimpton (1); SYD: Trent D'Antonio (1); Attendance: 797; Boxscore

13 November 2010 19:30 (UTC+11:00) at Blacktown Olympic Park, Sydney (F/7)
Team	1	2	3	4	5	6	7	8	9	R	H	E
Canberra	0	1	0	0	0	1	1			3	8	4
Sydney	0	0	4	1	0	8	X			13	11	1
WP: Wayne Lundgren (2–0) LP: Phil Brassington (0–1); Attendance: 998; Boxscore

14 November 2010 13:30 (UTC+11:00) at Blacktown Olympic Park, Sydney
Team	1	2	3	4	5	6	7	8	9	R	H	E
Canberra	3	0	0	1	0	0	0	0	1	5	11	3
Sydney	0	0	0	0	3	0	3	1	X	7	10	1
WP: Aaron Sookee (1–0) LP: Tim Atherton (0–1) Sv: Koo Dae-Sung (3); Home runs: CAN: None; SYD: Alex Johnson (1); Attendance: 984; Boxscore

=== Round 2 ===
The Perth Heat had their home opening series, hosting the Adelaide Bite at Baseball Park as did Canberra Cavalry in facing the Melbourne Aces at Narrabundah Ballpark. The Brisbane Bandits continued their homestand, playing the Sydney Blue Sox at the Brisbane Exhibition Ground.

==== Perth v Adelaide ====
In their first game at home for the season, Perth defeated Adelaide 4–2. Matt Kennelly and Luke Hughes each hit home runs in the fourth and fifth innings respectively to lead the Heat offence. Despite home runs from Evan McArthur and Ronnie Welty, Adelaide were able to square the series by winning 7–3 in the second game; James McOwen homered as part of the Bite's 6-run sixth inning, while Quincy Latimore hit his 4th home run of the season in the seventh. Tied at 4–4 at the end of nine innings, game three went into extra innings. Ronnie Welty produced a walk-off home run in the bottom of the twelfth inning; his second home run in as many days to give the Heat a 6–4 win. The final game of the series was won by Adelaide 4–3. Quincy Latimore hit an RBI-double in the top of the ninth inning to put the Bite in front. In trying to score the tying run, Matt Kennelly was thrown out at home plate by James McOwen in center field for the final out of the game.

17 November 2010 19:00 (UTC+08:00) at Baseball Park, Perth
Team	1	2	3	4	5	6	7	8	9	R	H	E
Adelaide	1	1	0	0	0	0	0	0	0	2	8	2
Perth	0	1	0	2	1	0	0	0	X	4	8	0
WP: Cameron Lamb (2–0) LP: Paul Mildren (1–1) Sv: Brett Jacobson (2); Home runs: ADE: None; PER: Matt Kennelly (1), Luke Hughes (3); Attendance: 1,000; Boxscore

18 November 2010 11:00 (UTC+08:00) at Baseball Park, Perth
Team	1	2	3	4	5	6	7	8	9	R	H	E
Adelaide	0	0	0	0	0	6	1	0	0	7	9	1
Perth	0	0	0	0	0	2	1	0	0	3	10	0
WP: Darren Fidge (2–0) LP: Daniel Schmidt (1–1); Home runs: ADE: James McOwen (1), Quincy Latimore (4); PER: Evan McArthur (1), Ronnie Welty (1); Attendance: 400; Boxscore

19 November 2010 19:00 (UTC+08:00) at Baseball Park, Perth (F/12)
Team	1	2	3	4	5	6	7	8	9	10	11	12	R	H	E
Adelaide	0	0	0	0	0	0	2	2	0	0	0	0	4	7	2
Perth	3	1	0	0	0	0	0	0	0	0	0	2	6	11	4
WP: Dean White (1–1) LP: Ryan Murphy (1–1); Home runs: PER: None; PER: Ronnie Welty (2); Attendance: 1,000; Boxscore

20 November 2010 19:00 (UTC+08:00) at Baseball Park, Perth
Team	1	2	3	4	5	6	7	8	9	R	H	E
Adelaide	1	0	1	0	0	0	0	1	1	4	10	2
Perth	0	0	0	0	0	1	1	1	0	3	8	0
WP: Wayne Ough (1–0) LP: Liam Baron (0–1); Home runs: ADE: James McOwen (2); PER: None; Attendance: 1,200; Boxscore

==== Canberra v Melbourne ====
18 November 2010 19:00 (UTC+11:00) at Narrabundah Ballpark, Canberra
Team	1	2	3	4	5	6	7	8	9	R	H	E
Melbourne	0	0	2	0	0	0	0	0	0	2	6	1
Canberra	1	0	0	0	4	0	0	0	X	5	8	2
WP: Heo Jun-Hyeok (1–2) LP: Norihito Kaneto (0–2) Sv: Chris Morgan (1); Home runs: MEL: None; CAN: Moon Kyu-Hyun (1); Attendance: 1,382; Boxscore

19 November 2010 19:00 (UTC+11:00) at Narrabundah Ballpark, Canberra
Team	1	2	3	4	5	6	7	8	9	R	H	E
Melbourne	0	1	0	0	0	0	0	3	0	4	7	1
Canberra	0	0	0	0	0	0	0	0	0	0	2	1
WP: Adam Blackley (1–1) LP: Steve Kent (0–1) Sv: Tetsu Nishikawa (1); Attendance: 957; Boxscore

20 November 2010 16:00 (UTC+11:00) at Narrabundah Ballpark, Canberra
Team	1	2	3	4	5	6	7	R	H	E
Melbourne	2	0	0	0	0	0	1	3	3	3
Canberra	0	0	0	0	0	1	0	1	4	1
WP: Greg Wiltshire (1–0) LP: Jin Myung-Ho (0–1) Sv: Masumi Hoshino (1); Home runs: MEL: Andrew Russell (1); CAN: None; Notes: Scheduled as 7 innings. The first game of a doubleheader. Boxscore

20 November 2010 19:00 (UTC+11:00) at Narrabundah Ballpark, Canberra (F/11)
Team	1	2	3	4	5	6	7	8	9	10	11	R	H	E
Melbourne	3	0	3	0	0	0	0	1	1	0	0	8	12	4
Canberra	1	2	3	2	0	0	0	0	0	0	1	9	11	0
WP: Phil Brassington (1–1) LP: Adam Bright (0–1); Home runs: MEL: None; CAN: Josh Davies (1); Attendance: 1,215; Notes: The second game of a doubleheader. Boxscore

==== Brisbane v Sydney ====
18 November 2010 19:00 (UTC+10:00) at Brisbane Exhibition Ground
Team	1	2	3	4	5	6	7	8	9	R	H	E
Sydney	0	0	1	0	3	0	0	0	1	5	7	2
Brisbane	1	3	1	3	0	0	1	0	X	9	15	1
WP: James Albury (1–0) LP: Wayne Lundgren (2–1); Home runs: SYD: Mitch Denning (1), Alex Johnson (2); BRI: None; Attendance: 654; Boxscore

19 November 2010 16:30 (UTC+10:00) at Brisbane Exhibition Ground (F/12)
Team	1	2	3	4	5	6	7	8	9	10	11	12	R	H	E
Sydney	1	0	0	0	0	2	0	0	0	0	0	0	3	11	1
Brisbane	0	0	2	0	1	0	0	0	0	0	0	1	4	7	0
WP: Chris Mowday (2–1) LP: Koo Dae-Sung (0–1); Notes: Originally scheduled as 7 innings. The first game of a doubleheader. Boxscore

19 November 2010 21:00 (UTC+10:00) at Brisbane Exhibition Ground
Team	1	2	3	4	5	6	7	R	H	E
Sydney	0	0	0	0	1	3	0	4	7	1
Brisbane	0	0	0	0	0	0	0	0	1	0
WP: Chris Oxspring (2–0) LP: Ryan Searle (0–2); Home runs: SYD: Alex Johnson (3); BRI: None; Attendance: 1,203; Notes: Scheduled as 9 innings but shortened to 7. The second game of a doubleheader. Boxscore

21 November 2010 14:00 (UTC+10:00) at Brisbane Exhibition Ground
Team	1	2	3	4	5	6	7	8	9	R	H	E
Sydney	0	0	0	0	0	0	2	0	0	2	7	1
Brisbane	0	0	0	0	0	0	0	0	0	0	6	1
WP: Craig Anderson (1–0) LP: Justin Erasmus (0–1) Sv: Koo Dae-Sung (4); Attendance: 1,050; Boxscore

=== Round 3 ===
The third round of the season had the same match-ups of teams from the previous round, but with a switch of home and away teams: the Adelaide Bite hosted the Perth Heat at Coopers Stadium, the Melbourne Aces had their home opener against the Canberra Cavalry at the Melbourne Showgrounds, and the Sydney Blue Sox faced the Brisbane Bandits at Blacktown Olympic Park.

==== Adelaide v Perth ====
25 November 2010 19:00 (UTC+10:30) at Coopers Stadium, Adelaide
Team	1	2	3	4	5	6	7	8	9	R	H	E
Perth	0	4	0	4	0	0	1	0	0	9	12	1
Adelaide	0	0	4	0	1	1	0	0	1	7	10	0
WP: Warwick Saupold (2–0) LP: Paul Mildren (1–2) Sv: Brett Jacobson (3); Home runs: PER: Evan McArthur (2), Allan de San Miguel (1), Mitchell Graham (1); ADE: Jeremy Cresswell 2 (2), James McOwen (3); Attendance: 1,399; Boxscore

26 November 2010 19:00 (UTC+10:30) at Coopers Stadium, Adelaide
Team	1	2	3	4	5	6	7	8	9	R	H	E
Perth	0	2	0	0	2	0	0	5	0	9	12	0
Adelaide	0	0	0	0	0	0	0	3	0	3	12	2
WP: Daniel Schmidt (2–1) LP: Darren Fidge (2–1); Home runs: PER: Allan de San Miguel (2); ADE: None; Attendance: 1,639; Boxscore

27 November 2010 16:00 (UTC+10:30) at Coopers Stadium, Adelaide
Team	1	2	3	4	5	6	7	R	H	E
Perth	0	0	0	2	0	0	0	2	9	0
Adelaide	0	0	0	4	0	0	X	4	4	1
WP: Brandon Maurer (1–0) LP: Cole McCurry (0–1) Sv: Mark Brackman (1); Home runs: PER: Evan McArthur (3); ADE: Brendon Pett (1); Notes: Scheduled as 7 innings. The first game of a doubleheader. Boxscore

27 November 2010 19:00 (UTC+10:30) at Coopers Stadium, Adelaide
Team	1	2	3	4	5	6	7	8	9	R	H	E
Perth	0	0	0	0	2	2	0	0	0	4	7	2
Adelaide	0	0	6	0	2	3	0	0	X	11	12	2
WP: Dushan Ruzic (2–0) LP: Liam Hendriks (0–1); Home runs: PER: Clint Balgera (1), Allan de San Miguel (3); ADE: Quincy Latimore (5), Brandon Bantz (1); Attendance: 1,622; Notes: The second game of a doubleheader. Boxscore

==== Melbourne v Canberra ====
The Melbourne Aces were scheduled to open their first home series of the season on Friday, 26 November but had to wait for two days and three games to be rained out. As a result, the series was shortened to two 7 inning games played on Sunday, 28 November. In the first game the Aces scored all their runs from four home runs, including 2-run shots from Scott Wearne (2–for–3) in the first inning and Grant Karlsen (2–for–3 with a double) in the fourth, allowing Melbourne to win 6–2. Wearne hit another first-inning home run in the second game, but the highlight—also in the first inning—of the game was a grand slam from Takahiro Ijyuin. Both home runs helped to set up a comfortable 10–2 win for the Aces to complete a sweep of the shortened series.

28 November 2010 12:00 (UTC+11:00) at Melbourne Showgrounds
Team	1	2	3	4	5	6	7	R	H	E
Canberra	0	0	0	2	0	0	0	2	6	1
Melbourne	2	0	0	4	0	0	X	6	9	0
WP: Greg Wiltshire (2–0) LP: Heo Jun-Hyeok (1–3); Home runs: CAN: Nick Kimpton (2); MEL: Scott Wearne (1), Josh Davies (2), Grant Karlsen (1), Itaru Hashimoto (1); Notes: Re-scheduled as the first game of a doubleheader for 7 innings. Boxscore

28 November 2010 15:00 (UTC+11:00) at Melbourne Showgrounds
Team	1	2	3	4	5	6	7	R	H	E
Canberra	0	2	0	0	0	0	0	2	5	2
Melbourne	6	1	0	0	0	3	X	10	8	0
WP: Norihito Kaneto (1–2) LP: Steven Kent (0–2); Home runs: CAN: None; MEL: Scott Wearne (2), Takahiro Ijyuin (1); Attendance: 783; Notes: Shortened to 7 innings, as part of a make-up doubleheader. Boxscore

==== Sydney v Brisbane ====
26 November 2010 19:30 (UTC+11:00) at Blacktown Olympic Park, Sydney
Team	1	2	3	4	5	6	7	8	9	R	H	E
Brisbane	0	0	0	2	2	0	2	0	0	6	12	0
Sydney	0	0	0	1	0	0	0	0	0	1	6	2
WP: James Albury (2–0) LP: Wayne Lundgren (2–2); Home runs: BRI: Josh Roberts (1); SYD: None; Attendance: 1,314; Boxscore

27 November 2010 17:00 (UTC+11:00) at Blacktown Olympic Park, Sydney
Team	1	2	3	4	5	6	7	R	H	E
Brisbane	0	0	0	0	0	0	1	1	7	1
Sydney	0	0	2	0	0	1	X	3	8	1
WP: David Welch (1–0) LP: Ryan Searle (0–3) Sv: Koo Dae-Sung (5); Notes: Scheduled as 7 innings. The first game of a doubleheader. Boxscore

27 November 2010 19:30 (UTC+11:00) at Blacktown Olympic Park, Sydney (F/11)
Team	1	2	3	4	5	6	7	8	9	10	11	R	H	E
Brisbane	0	0	0	0	0	3	0	0	0	0	9	12	18	0
Sydney	0	1	1	0	1	0	0	0	0	0	0	3	5	3
WP: Chris Mowday (3–1) LP: Matthew Williams (0–1); Attendance: 1,770; Notes: The second game of a doubleheader. Boxscore

28 November 2010 13:30 (UTC+11:00) at Blacktown Olympic Park, Sydney (F/5)
Team	1	2	3	4	5	6	7	8	9	R	H	E
Brisbane	0	0	0	0	0					0	2	1
Sydney	0	1	0	0	0					1	4	0
WP: Vaughan Harris (1–0) LP: Justin Erasmus (0–2); Attendance: 1,135; Notes: Called due to rain. Boxscore

=== Round 4 ===
The Canberra Cavalry returned to the Narrabundah Ballpark to host the Adelaide Bite. The Perth Heat also returned to their home ground at Baseball Park to face the Brisbane Bandits, completing their season series. The Sydney Blue Sox completed their homestand against the Melbourne Aces at Blacktown Olympic Park.

==== Canberra v Adelaide ====
As was the case for Canberra's previous series in Melbourne, the opening game of the series was called off because of the rain before a pitch was thrown. The game was rescheduled for the following day as part of a doubleheader.

3 December 2010 16:00 (UTC+11:00) at Narrabundah Ballpark, Canberra
Team	1	2	3	4	5	6	7	R	H	E
Adelaide	0	0	0	0	0	0	1	1	6	0
Canberra	0	0	0	0	0	3	X	3	7	2
WP: Rinku Singh (1–0) LP: Paul Mildren (1–3) Sv: Chris Morgan (2); Notes: Re-scheduled as the first game of a doubleheader for 7 innings. Boxscore

3 December 2010 19:30 (UTC+11:00) at Narrabundah Ballpark, Canberra
Team	1	2	3	4	5	6	7	R	H	E
Adelaide	0	0	0	1	0	0	5	6	0	2
Canberra	0	0	0	0	11	0	X	11	0	0
WP: Michael Lennox (1–0) LP: Darren Fidge (2–2) Sv: Alex Rogers (1); Home runs: ADE: Brandon Bantz (2); CAN: None; Attendance: 897; Notes: Shortened to 7 innings, as part of a make-up doubleheader. Boxscore

4 December 2010 16:00 (UTC+11:00) at Narrabundah Ballpark, Canberra
Team	1	2	3	4	5	6	7	R	H	E
Adelaide	0	0	0	0	1	0	0	1	5	1
Canberra	0	1	3	0	2	0	X	6	9	1
WP: Heo Jun-Hyeok (2–3) LP: Brandon Maurer (1–1); Home runs: ADE: None; CAN: Donald Lutz (1); Attendance: 792; Notes: Scheduled as 7 innings. The first game of a doubleheader. Boxscore

==== Perth v Brisbane ====
Brisbane dominated Perth in the first game of the series to win in 8–1. Alan Schoenberger led the offence for the Bandits, hitting 3–for–4 with a double and a run batted in, as did Shuhei Fukuda with a home run in the first at bat of the game. Hiroki Yamada was credited with the win on the mound, pitching for 7 innings, allowing 1 run on 5 hits, striking out 8.

2 December 2010 19:00 (UTC+08:00) at Baseball Park, Perth
Team	1	2	3	4	5	6	7	8	9	R	H	E
Brisbane	1	0	7	0	0	0	0	0	0	8	11	1
Perth	0	0	0	0	0	0	1	0	0	1	5	3
WP: Hiroki Yamada (1–1) LP: Liam Hendriks (0–2); Home runs: BRI: Shuhei Fukuda (1); PER: None; Attendance: 200; Boxscore

3 December 2010 19:00 (UTC+08:00) at Baseball Park, Perth
Team	1	2	3	4	5	6	7	8	9	R	H	E
Brisbane	0	0	0	0	2	0	0	0	0	2	8	3
Perth	0	2	0	0	3	0	0	2	X	7	6	0
WP: Daniel Schmidt (3–1) LP: James Albury (2–1) Sv: Cameron Lamb (1); Home runs: BRI: Josh Roberts (2); PER: Robbie Widlansky (2); Attendance: 600; Boxscore

4 December 2010 15:00 (UTC+08:00) at Baseball Park, Perth (F/12)
Team	1	2	3	4	5	6	7	8	9	10	11	12	R	H	E
Brisbane	0	0	0	0	1	0	0	0	0	0	0	2	3	13	0
Perth	1	0	0	0	0	0	0	0	0	0	0	0	1	7	1
WP: Simon Morriss (1–0) LP: Dean White (1–2); Boxscore

4 December 2010 19:00 (UTC+08:00) at Baseball Park, Perth
Team	1	2	3	4	5	6	7	8	9	R	H	E
Brisbane	0	0	0	0	0	0	1	1	0	2	6	1
Perth	0	0	0	1	1	0	0	0	1	3	5	0
WP: Liam Baron (1–1) LP: Simon Morriss (1–1); Home runs: BRI: Brandon Dale (1); PER: None; Attendance: 1,383; Boxscore

==== Sydney v Melbourne ====
3 December 2010 19:30 (UTC+11:00) at Blacktown Olympic Park, Sydney
Team	1	2	3	4	5	6	7	8	9	R	H	E
Melbourne	0	0	1	0	0	0	0	0	0	1	7	1
Sydney	1	2	0	0	0	0	0	0	X	3	5	0
WP: Chris Oxspring (3–0) LP: Adam Blackley (1–2) Sv: Koo Dae-Sung (6); Attendance: 1,019; Boxscore

5 December 2010 11:00 (UTC+11:00) at Blacktown Olympic Park, Sydney
Team	1	2	3	4	5	6	7	R	H	E
Melbourne	1	0	0	0	0	0	0	1	3	1
Sydney	0	0	0	0	0	2	X	2	3	1
WP: Wayne Lundgren (3–2) LP: Jumpei Ono (0–1) Sv: Koo Dae-Sung (7); Home runs: MEL: Yoshiyuki Kamei (1); SYD: None; Notes: Re-scheduled as the first game of a doubleheader for 7 innings. Boxscore

5 December 2010 15:30 (UTC+11:00) at Blacktown Olympic Park, Sydney (F/8)
Team	1	2	3	4	5	6	7	8	R	H	E
Melbourne	0	0	0	0	0	0	0	1	1	3	0
Sydney	0	0	0	0	0	0	0	1	1	1	0
Attendance: 1,540; Notes: Shortened to 7 innings, as part of a make-up doubleheader. ABL tiebreaking rule in effect for extra innings due to league imposed curfew. Game officially called complete as a tie. Boxscore

=== Round 5 ===
The Adelaide Bite completed their road trip, facing the Brisbane Bandits at the Brisbane Exhibition Ground. The Perth Heat completed their homestand, playing the Canberra Cavalry at Baseball Park in Perth. The Melbourne Aces hosted the Sydney Blue Sox for the final games of their season series, including a makeup game from the previous round in Sydney.

==== Brisbane v Adelaide ====
9 December 2010 19:00 (UTC+10:00) at Brisbane Exhibition Ground
Team	1	2	3	4	5	6	7	8	9	R	H	E
Bite	0	4	0	2	0	0	0	0	2	8	8	1
Bandits	0	0	0	2	0	1	0	0	1	4	7	0
WP: Mark Brackman (1–0) LP: James Albury (2–2) Sv: Darren Fidge (1); Home runs: ADE: Stefan Welch 2 (2), Brandon Bantz (3); BRI: Akira Nakamura (1); Attendance: 801; Boxscore

10 December 2010 19:00 (UTC+10:00) at Brisbane Exhibition Ground
Team	1	2	3	4	5	6	7	8	9	R	H	E
Bite	1	0	0	0	0	0	0	0	0	1	8	0
Bandits	2	0	0	0	0	0	0	1	X	3	8	1
WP: Hiroki Yamada (2–1) LP: Paul Mildren (1–4) Sv: Simon Morriss (2); Home runs: ADE: Stefan Welch (3); BRI: Rory Rhodes (1); Attendance: 1,205; Boxscore

==== Perth v Canberra ====
9 December 2010 19:00 (UTC+08:00) at Baseball Park, Perth
Team	1	2	3	4	5	6	7	8	9	R	H	E
Canberra	0	0	0	0	0	0	0	0	0	0	0	0
Perth	0	1	2	2	2	0	0	0	X	7	6	0
WP: Liam Hendriks (1–2) LP: Jin Myung-Ho (0–2); Home runs: CAN: None; PER: Mitch Graham (2), Ronnie Welty (3); Attendance: 593; Boxscore

10 December 2010 19:00 (UTC+08:00) at Baseball Park, Perth
Team	1	2	3	4	5	6	7	8	9	R	H	E
Canberra	0	0	0	0	0	0	0			0	5	0
Perth	4	3	2	1	0	0	X			10	10	0
WP: Daniel Schmidt (4–1) LP: Steven Kent (0–3); Home runs: CAN: None; PER: Mitch Graham (3); Attendance: 900; Boxscore

11 December 2010 15:00 (UTC+08:00) at Baseball Park, Perth (F/9)
Team	1	2	3	4	5	6	7	8	9	R	H	E
Canberra	0	0	0	1	0	0	0	0	0	1	5	2
Perth	0	0	0	0	0	0	1	0	1	2	8	1
WP: Liam Baron (2–1) LP: Chris Morgan (0–1); Home runs: CAN: Michael Collins (1); PER: None; Notes: Scheduled as 7 innings. The first game of a doubleheader. Boxscore

11 December 2010 19:00 (UTC+08:00) at Baseball Park, Perth
Team	1	2	3	4	5	6	7	8	9	R	H	E
Canberra	0	0	0	1	1	0	0	0	0	2	8	1
Perth	0	0	0	0	2	0	5	1	X	8	8	0
WP: Tyler Anderson (1–0) LP: Phil Brassington (1–2); Attendance: 1,069; Notes: The second game of a doubleheader. Boxscore

==== Melbourne v Sydney ====
10 December 2010 19:00 (UTC+11:00) at Melbourne Showgrounds (F/15)
Team	1	2	3	4	5	6	7	8	9	10	11	12	13	14	15	R	H	E
Sydney	0	0	0	0	2	0	0	2	0	0	0	0	0	0	0	4	9	1
Melbourne	0	0	0	0	0	0	0	4	0	0	0	0	0	0	2	6	14	3
WP: Adam Bright (1–1) LP: Matthew Rae (0–1); Home runs: SYD: Boss Moanaroa (1), Michael Lysaught (1); MEL: Justin Huber (2), Josh Davies 2 (4); Attendance: 1,998; Boxscore

11 December 2010 16:30 (UTC+11:00) at Melbourne Showgrounds (F/8)
Team	1	2	3	4	5	6	7	8	R	H	E
Sydney	0	2	0	0	0	0	4	0	6	7	2
Melbourne	2	2	0	1	0	1	0	1	7	14	3
WP: Masumi Hoshino (1–0) LP: Todd Van Steensel (0–1); Home runs: SYD: Mitch Dening 2 (3); MEL: None; Notes: Scheduled as 7 innings. The first game of a doubleheader. Boxscore

11 December 2010 19:00 (UTC+11:00) at Melbourne Showgrounds
Team	1	2	3	4	5	6	7	8	9	R	H	E
Sydney	0	3	0	0	0	0	1	0	0	4	7	2
Melbourne	0	0	0	0	0	0	1	0	0	1	7	1
WP: David Welch (2–0) LP: Travis Blackley (0–1) Sv: Koo Dae-Sung (8); Home runs: SYD: Alex Johnson (4); MEL: Takahiro Ijyuin (2); Attendance: 1,113; Notes: The second game of a doubleheader. Boxscore

12 December 2010 11:00 (UTC+11:00) at Melbourne Showgrounds
Team	1	2	3	4	5	6	7	R	H	E
Melbourne	1	1	0	0	4	5	1	12	17	1
Sydney	0	1	0	0	2	2	0	5	6	3
WP: Matthew Blackmore (1–0) LP: Craig Anderson (1–1); Home runs: MEL: Yoshiyuki Kamei (2), Andrew Russell (2), Takahiro Ijyuin (3); SYD: Michael Lysaught (2), Patrick Maat (1); Notes: Re-scheduled from round 4, to 7 innings as the first game of a doubleheader. Boxscore

12 December 2010 15:00 (UTC+11:00) at Melbourne Showgrounds (F/7)
Team	1	2	3	4	5	6	7	8	9	R	H	E
Sydney	0	1	0	0	1	0	1			3	5	1
Melbourne	1	4	1	7	2	3	X			18	17	1
WP: Jumpei Ono (1–1) LP: Vaughan Harris (1–1); Home runs: SYD: Boss Moanaroa 2 (3), Josh Dean (1); MEL: Itaru Hashimoto (2), Yoshiyuki Kamei (3), Andrew Russell (3), Nathan Aron (1); Attendance: 754; Notes: The second game of a doubleheader. Boxscore

=== Round 6 ===
The Canberra Cavalry hosted the Perth Heat at Narrabundah Ballpark to complete their season series. The Sydney Blue Sox continued their road trip, facing the Adelaide Bite at Coopers Stadium. The Melbourne Aces completed their homestand with two back–to–back series at the Melbourne Showgrounds; two games against the Cavalry to make up for the games washed out in round 3, and four against the Brisbane Bandits as was originally scheduled.

==== Canberra v Perth ====
16 December 2010 19:00 (UTC+11:00) at Narrabundah Ballpark, Canberra
Team	1	2	3	4	5	6	7	8	9	R	H	E
Perth	0	1	1	0	0	0	1	2	0	5	7	1
Canberra	1	3	0	2	0	0	0	1	X	7	14	0
WP: Tim Atherton (1–1) LP: Liam Hendriks (1–3) Sv: Hayden Beard (1); Attendance: 874; Boxscore

17 December 2010 19:00 (UTC+11:00) at Narrabundah Ballpark, Canberra
Team	1	2	3	4	5	6	7	8	9	R	H	E
Perth	0	0	0	0	3	0	0	0	2	5	10	2
Canberra	0	0	0	0	0	9	0	0	X	9	13	0
WP: Lee Jung-Min (1–0) LP: Daniel Schmidt (4–2); Home runs: PER: Donald Lutz (2); CAN: Ronnie Welty (4); Attendance: 1,006; Boxscore

18 December 2010 16:00 (UTC+11:00) at Narrabundah Ballpark, Canberra
Team	1	2	3	4	5	6	7	R	H	E
Perth	0	4	3	1	0	0	0	8	8	3
Canberra	0	1	0	0	0	0	0	1	2	3
WP: Benn Grice (1–0) LP: Heo Jun-Hyeok (2–4); Home runs: PER: Evan McArthur (4), Ryne Price 2 (2), Ronnie Welty (5); CAN: None; Notes: Scheduled as 7 innings. The first game of a doubleheader. Boxscore

18 December 2010 19:00 (UTC+11:00) at Narrabundah Ballpark, Canberra
Team	1	2	3	4	5	6	7	8	9	R	H	E
Perth	0	0	0	2	2	0	0	0	0	4	11	0
Canberra	0	3	1	1	0	1	0	0	X	6	16	1
WP: Tim Atherton (2–1) LP: Warwick Saupold (2–1) Sv: Hayden Beard (2); Home runs: PER: Tim Kennelly (1); CAN: None; Attendance: 992; Notes: The second game of a doubleheader. Boxscore

==== Adelaide v Sydney ====
16 December 2010 19:00 (UTC+10:30) at Coopers Stadium, Adelaide
Team	1	2	3	4	5	6	7	8	9	R	H	E
Sydney	0	0	0	0	1	0	1	1	0	3	6	1
Adelaide	0	2	1	0	0	0	0	0	1	4	5	0
WP: Dushan Ruzic (3–0) LP: Vaughan Harris (1–2); Home runs: SYD: Boss Moanaroa (4); ADE: James McOwen (4); Attendance: 1,305; Boxscore

17 December 2010 19:00 (UTC+10:30) at Coopers Stadium, Adelaide
Team	1	2	3	4	5	6	7	8	9	R	H	E
Sydney	2	2	0	0	0	0	1	0	0	5	10	1
Adelaide	0	0	0	0	0	0	0	0	0	0	2	1
WP: David Welch (3–0) LP: Paul Mildren (1–5); Home runs: SYD: Michael Lysaught (3), Alex Johnson (5); ADE: None; Attendance: 2,601; Boxscore

18 December 2010 19:00 (UTC+10:30) at Coopers Stadium, Adelaide
Team	1	2	3	4	5	6	7	8	9	R	H	E
Sydney	0	1	1	0	0	0	1	0	0	3	10	2
Adelaide	2	0	0	0	0	3	0	2	X	7	12	1
WP: Brandon Maurer (2–1) LP: Wayne Lundgren (3–3); Home runs: SYD: None; ADE: James McOwen (4); Attendance: 1,374; Boxscore

19 December 2010 19:00 (UTC+10:30) at Coopers Stadium, Adelaide
Team	1	2	3	4	5	6	7	8	9	R	H	E
Sydney	0	2	0	0	0	2	0	0	0	4	7	0
Adelaide	0	0	0	0	0	0	0	0	0	0	4	0
WP: Craig Anderson (2–1) LP: Dushan Ruzic (3–1); Attendance: 849; Boxscore

==== Melbourne v Canberra ====
20 December 2010 11:00 (UTC+11:00) at Melbourne Showgrounds
Team	1	2	3	4	5	6	7	R	H	E
Canberra	1	0	2	0	0	0	0	3	1	2
Melbourne	1	8	0	3	4	4	X	20	20	1
WP: Norihito Kaneto (2–2) LP: Luke Wilkins (0–1); Home runs: CAN: None; MEL: Yoshiyuki Kamei (4), Andrew Russell 2 (5), Justin Huber (3); Notes: Re-scheduled as the first game of a doubleheader for 7 innings. Boxscore

20 December 2010 14:00 (UTC+11:00) at Melbourne Showgrounds
Team	1	2	3	4	5	6	7	R	H	E
Canberra	0	0	0	0	0	1	2	3	5	2
Melbourne	0	0	0	0	2	0	0	2	4	0
WP: Nathan Crawford (1–0) LP: Adam Bright (1–2) Sv: Tim Atherton (1); Home runs: CAN: None; MEL: Andrew Russell (6); Attendance: 314; Notes: Re-scheduled as the second game of a doubleheader for 7 innings. Boxscore

==== Melbourne v Brisbane ====
21 December 2010 19:00 (UTC+11:00) at Melbourne Showgrounds (F/8)
Team	1	2	3	4	5	6	7	8	9	R	H	E
Brisbane	2	0	2	0	2	0	0	2		8	10	3
Melbourne	0	3	1	4	0	0	3	7		18	15	1
WP: Greg Wiltshire (3–0) LP: Hiroki Yamada (2–2) Sv: Adam Bright (1); Home runs: BRI: Alan Schoenberger 2 (2), Shuhei Fukuda 2 (3), Akira Nakamura (1); MEL: Justin Huber (4), Grant Karlsen (2), Scott Wearne (3); Attendance: 723; Boxscore

22 December 2010 16:30 (UTC+11:00) at Melbourne Showgrounds
Team	1	2	3	4	5	6	7	R	H	E
Brisbane	0	0	3	1	0	1	5	10	8	1
Melbourne	0	3	5	0	2	2	X	12	14	4
WP: Tetsu Nishikawa (1–0) LP: Ryan Searle (0–4) Sv: David Miller (1); Home runs: BRI: Josh Roberts 2 (4), Brad Dutton 2 (2); MEL: Josh Davies (5), Paul Rutgers (1), Justin Huber (5); Notes: Scheduled as 7 innings. The first game of a doubleheader. Boxscore

22 December 2010 19:00 (UTC+11:00) at Melbourne Showgrounds (F/7)
Team	1	2	3	4	5	6	7	8	9	R	H	E
Brisbane	0	0	0	0	0	0	0			0	2	2
Melbourne	0	6	2	0	0	1	1			10	12	1
WP: Adam Blackley (2–2) LP: Reo Chikada (0–1); Home runs: BRI: None; MEL: Yoshiyuki Kamei (5), Justin Huber (6); Attendance: 1,203; Notes: The second game of a doubleheader Boxscore

23 December 2010 19:00 (UTC+11:00) at Melbourne Showgrounds (F/7)
Team	1	2	3	4	5	6	7	8	9	R	H	E
Brisbane	1	0	0	0	0	0	2			3	7	0
Melbourne	2	0	4	2	2	6	X			16	15	1
WP: Jeff Jamnik (1–0) LP: James Albury (2–3); Home runs: BRI: Shuhei Fukuda (4); MEL: Yoshiyuki Kamei 2 (7), Grant Karlsen 2 (4); Attendance: 952; Boxscore

=== Round 7 ===
The Adelaide Bite completed their homestand by hosting the Canberra Cavalry for a five–game series, including a game postponed from round 4 due to wet weather, at Coopers Stadium, Adelaide. The Brisbane Bandits returned home to complete their season series against the Melbourne Aces at the Brisbane Exhibition Ground. The Perth Heat faced the Sydney Blue Sox for the first time in the season, playing at Baseball Park, Perth.

==== Adelaide v Canberra ====
29 December 2010 19:00 (UTC+10:30) at Coopers Stadium, Adelaide
Team	1	2	3	4	5	6	7	8	9	R	H	E
Adelaide	0	0	0	0	0	0	0	0	0	0	3	1
Canberra	0	0	3	0	0	0	0	1	X	4	8	0
WP: Heo Jun-Hyeok (3–4) LP: Mark Brackman (1–1); Home runs: ADE: None; CAN: Didi Gregorius (1); Attendance: 914; Notes: Re-scheduled from round 4. Boxscore

30 December 2010 19:00 (UTC+10:30) at Coopers Stadium, Adelaide
Team	1	2	3	4	5	6	7	8	9	R	H	E
Canberra	0	0	0	0	0	0	0	0	0	0	2	2
Adelaide	2	2	0	0	0	0	0	0	X	4	9	1
WP: Paul Mildren (2–5) LP: Lee Jung-Min (1–1); Home runs: CAN: None; ADE: Stefan Welch (4); Attendance: 1,335; Boxscore

31 December 2010 17:00 (UTC+10:30) at Coopers Stadium, Adelaide
Team	1	2	3	4	5	6	7	8	9	R	H	E
Canberra	0	0	0	0	0	0	0	0	0	1	3	2
Adelaide	3	2	1	0	1	0	1	0	X	8	7	0
WP: Brandon Maurer (3–1) LP: Phil Brassington (1–3); Home runs: CAN: None; ADE: Tom Brice (1); Attendance: 778; Boxscore

1 January 2011 17:00 (UTC+10:30) at Coopers Stadium, Adelaide
Team	1	2	3	4	5	6	7	8	9	R	H	E
Canberra	0	0	0	0	0	0	1	1	0	2	6	1
Adelaide	0	0	0	0	0	0	5	0	X	5	5	0
WP: Dushan Ruzic (4–1) LP: Tim Atherton (2–2) Sv: Jackson Lodge (1); Home runs: CAN: Michael Wells (1), Lee Seung-Hwa (1); ADE: None; Attendance: 1,343; Boxscore

2 January 2011 13:00 (UTC+10:30) at Coopers Stadium, Adelaide (F/7)
Team	1	2	3	4	5	6	7	8	9	R	H	E
Canberra	1	0	0	0	0	0	0			1	1	2
Adelaide	2	0	0	5	4	1	X			12	10	1
WP: Darren Fidge (3–2) LP: Michael Lennox (1–1); Home runs: CAN: None; ADE: Scott Gladstone (1), James McOwen (6), Stefan Welch (5); Attendance: 1,292; Boxscore

==== Brisbane v Melbourne ====
30 December 2010 19:00 (UTC+10:00) at Brisbane Exhibition Ground
Team	1	2	3	4	5	6	7	8	9	R	H	E
Melbourne	0	0	2	5	2	1	0	0	0	10	12	2
Brisbane	0	0	2	0	1	3	0	2	0	8	13	2
WP: Adam Blackley (3–2) LP: James Albury (2–4) Sv: Adam Bright (2); Home runs: MEL: Brett Tamburrino (1); ADE: Joshua Roberts (5), Rory Rhodes (2); Attendance: 1,057; Boxscore

31 December 2010 18:00 (UTC+10:00) at Brisbane Exhibition Ground
Team	1	2	3	4	5	6	7	8	9	R	H	E
Melbourne	0	0	0	1	0	0	0	0	0	1	4	1
Brisbane	0	0	0	0	0	0	3	0	X	3	7	1
WP: Simon Morriss (2–1) LP: Shane Lindsay (0–1) Sv: Chris Mowday (1); Attendance: 886; Boxscore

1 January 2011 19:00 (UTC+10:00) at Brisbane Exhibition Ground
Team	1	2	3	4	5	6	7	8	9	R	H	E
Melbourne	0	2	0	1	2	0	0	0	2	7	14	0
Brisbane	2	0	0	0	0	1	0	1	0	4	5	1
WP: Greg Wiltshire (4–0) LP: Steven Chambers (0–1) Sv: Shane Lindsay (1); Home runs: MEL: Paul Rutgers (2); BRI: Chad Gabriel (1); Attendance: 1,167; Boxscore

2 January 2011 14:00 (UTC+10:00) at Brisbane Exhibition Ground
Team	1	2	3	4	5	6	7	8	9	R	H	E
Melbourne	0	0	0	0	1	0	0	0	0	1	6	5
Brisbane	0	1	3	1	1	0	0	0	X	6	11	3
WP: Chris Mowday (4–1) LP: Jeff Jamnik (1–1); Attendance: 958; Boxscore

==== Perth v Sydney ====
30 December 2010 19:00 (UTC+08:00) at Baseball Park, Perth
Team	1	2	3	4	5	6	7	8	9	R	H	E
Sydney	0	0	0	0	0	0	0	0	0	8	11	0
Perth	0	0	0	0	0	0	0	0	0	1	6	3
WP: Chris Oxspring (4–0) LP: Liam Hendriks (1–4); Home runs: SYD: Mitch Dening (4); PER: None; Attendance: 1,299; Boxscore

31 December 2010 19:00 (UTC+08:00) at Baseball Park, Perth
Team	1	2	3	4	5	6	7	8	9	R	H	E
Sydney	0	1	0	2	1	0	1	0	0	5	11	0
Perth	0	0	0	0	0	1	0	0	0	1	8	0
WP: David Welch (4–0) LP: Daniel Schmidt (4–3) Sv: Koo Dae-Sung (9); Home runs: SYD: Alex Johnson (6), Trent Schmutter (1); PER: None; Attendance: 1,237; Boxscore

1 January 2011 19:00 (UTC+08:00) at Baseball Park, Perth (F/10)
Team	1	2	3	4	5	6	7	8	9	10	R	H	E
Sydney	1	1	0	0	0	0	0	0	0	1	3	6	2
Perth	0	1	0	0	0	0	0	0	1	0	2	9	2
WP: Koo Dae-Sung (1–1) LP: Matt Zachary (0–1); Attendance: 1,215; Boxscore

2 January 2011 19:00 (UTC+08:00) at Baseball Park, Perth
Team	1	2	3	4	5	6	7	8	9	R	H	E
Sydney	4	3	0	0	2	1	0	0	0	10	11	1
Perth	0	0	0	0	1	2	0	0	0	3	6	2
WP: Craig Anderson (3–1) LP: Warwick Saupold (2–2); Attendance: 1,356; Boxscore

=== Round 8 ===
The Melbourne Aces started their final homestand of the season at the Melbourne Showgrounds, facing the Adelaide Bite to complete their season series. The Canberra Cavalry and the Brisbane Bandits met for the first time, at Narrabundah Ballpark. The Sydney Blue Sox and Perth Heat completed their season series in back–to–back rounds, at Blacktown Olympic Park.

==== Melbourne v Adelaide ====
Though Adelaide were able to put together an early 6-run lead through 3 home runs—including a grand slam from Tom Brice—Melbourne built their score throughout the game to win the opening game of the series 11–8. Of the Aces' 11 runs, 6 were unearned resulting from the Bite's 7 errors. In a reversal of form, Adelaide won the second game 6–3: two plays in the eighth inning that would otherwise have resulted in the third out were missed, each allowing the Bite to score an additional run to take the lead. For the third game in a row, the first team to score actually lost with Adelaide winning 9–2. Also continuing a trend in the series of runs scored from mistakes; both Bite runs scored in the sixth inning came when Melbourne's Shane Lindsay hit two consecutive hitters with bases loaded. Adelaide sealed the series win in the final game of the series, defeating Melbourne 10–7. The bite scored 5 runs without an out being recorded, including the first of two home runs from both Brandon Bantz and Tom Brice.

6 January 2011 19:00 (UTC+11:00) at Melbourne Showgrounds
Team	1	2	3	4	5	6	7	8	9	R	H	E
Adelaide	0	2	4	0	1	0	1	0	0	8	6	7
Melbourne	0	0	1	1	1	2	3	3	X	11	12	1
WP: Adam Bright (2–2) LP: Reed Brown (0–1); Home runs: ADE: Tom Brice 2 (3), Kwak Yong-Sup (1), Jeremy Cresswell (3); MEL: Brett Tamburrino (2), Scott Wearne (4), Andrew Russell (7); Attendance: 1,008; Boxscore

7 January 2011 19:00 (UTC+11:00) at Melbourne Showgrounds
Team	1	2	3	4	5	6	7	8	9	R	H	E
Adelaide	0	0	1	0	0	0	0	4	1	6	9	1
Melbourne	0	1	0	0	0	0	2	0	0	3	7	2
WP: Adrian Burnside (1–0) LP: Russell Spear (0–1) Sv: Tom Becker (1); Attendance: 1,342; Boxscore

8 January 2011 19:00 (UTC+11:00) at Melbourne Showgrounds
Team	1	2	3	4	5	6	7	8	9	R	H	E
Adelaide	0	0	0	0	4	2	2	0	1	9	15	0
Melbourne	0	2	0	0	0	0	0	0	0	2	5	1
WP: Brandon Maurer (4–1) LP: Adam Blackley (3–3); Home runs: ADE: James McOwen (7), Brandon Bantz (4), Jeremy Cresswell (4); MEL: Paul Rutgers (3); Attendance: 1,332; Boxscore

9 January 2011 15:00 (UTC+11:00) at Melbourne Showgrounds
Team	1	2	3	4	5	6	7	8	9	R	H	E
Adelaide	6	0	0	1	0	2	0	1	0	10	15	3
Melbourne	1	1	1	0	2	1	1	0	0	7	14	5
WP: Dushan Ruzic (5–1) LP: Jeff Jamnik (1–2) Sv: Tom Becker (2); Home runs: ADE: Brandon Bantz 2 (6), Tom Brice 2 (5); MEL: Paul Rutgers (4), Josh Davies (6); Attendance: 1,098; Boxscore

==== Canberra v Brisbane ====
The first game of the series was tied after the ninth inning, with both sides having had the lead at different points in the game. In the twelfth inning, Rory Rhodes for Brisbane and Donald Lutz for Canberra each hit solo home runs to keep the game tied. Alan Schoenberger scored the winning run in the thirteenth inning for the Bandits to win 7–6; Schoenberger doubled to centre field, was advanced by Wade Dutton's sacrifice bunt, and scored on Trent Baker's sacrifice fly. Alan Schoenberger opened the scoring in the second game with a grand slam in the second inning, while Michael Collins likewise ended the scoring with a grand slam in the eighth inning to give the win to Canberra 9–7. Despite Donald Lutz's third home run in as many games, Brisbane won the third game 16–9, after converting 7 hits and 5 walks in the first two innings into 11 runs. After the fourth game was tied in the bottom of the ninth inning through Tylor Prudhome's RBI-single broke the tie immediately in the tenth inning with an RBI-single from Trent Baker and a 3-run double from Josh Roberts to give Brisbane the win 8–4 and Canberra its first series loss at home.

6 January 2011 19:00 (UTC+11:00) at Narrabundah Ballpark, Canberra (F/13)
Team	1	2	3	4	5	6	7	8	9	10	11	12	13	R	H	E
Brisbane	0	0	0	3	0	2	0	0	0	0	0	1	1	7	16	1
Canberra	2	0	2	0	0	0	1	0	0	0	0	1	0	6	11	1
WP: Chris Mowday (5–1) LP: Chris Kimpton (0–1); Home runs: BRI: Chad Gabriel (2), Rory Rhodes (3); CAN: Donald Lutz (3); Attendance: 1,138; Boxscore

7 January 2011 19:00 (UTC+11:00) at Narrabundah Ballpark, Canberra
Team	1	2	3	4	5	6	7	8	9	R	H	E
Brisbane	0	4	0	1	0	1	0	1	0	7	9	0
Canberra	0	0	0	1	3	0	1	4	X	9	12	2
WP: Lee Jung-Min (2–1) LP: Chris Mowday (5–2) Sv: Tim Atherton (2); Home runs: BRI: Alan Schoenberger (3); CAN: Donald Lutz (4), Michael Collins (2); Attendance: 1,162; Boxscore

8 January 2011 19:00 (UTC+11:00) at Narrabundah Ballpark, Canberra
Team	1	2	3	4	5	6	7	8	9	R	H	E
Brisbane	6	5	0	2	0	3	0	0	0	16	17	0
Canberra	1	0	0	3	0	1	2	2	0	9	13	1
WP: James Albury (3–4) LP: Jarrett Commane (0–1); Home runs: BRI: None; CAN: Donald Lutz (5); Attendance: 1,358; Boxscore

9 January 2011 13:30 (UTC+11:00) at Narrabundah Ballpark, Canberra (F/10)
Team	1	2	3	4	5	6	7	8	9	10	R	H	E
Brisbane	0	0	0	0	0	1	2	0	1	4	8	13	0
Canberra	0	0	2	0	0	0	0	0	2	0	4	9	1
WP: Chris Mowday (6–2) LP: Chris Morgan (0–2); Attendance: 820; Boxscore

==== Sydney v Perth ====
Despite having been swept at home by Sydney the previous weekend, and the addition of two Major Leaguers to the Blue Sox roster, Perth opened the series with a 3–1 win. A two-run single from Robbie Widlansky in the sixth inning proved the difference between the two teams. Allan de San Miguel's two 2-run home runs gave the Heat the lead in the second game and then provided insurance against a late Blue Sox rally, allowing Perth an 11–7 win. In his longest start of the season, Cole McCurry pitched 7 innings, allowing 3 earned runs on 6 hits, striking out 7 to get his first win in Perth's 4–3 victory, ensuring a Heat series win. Blue Sox manager Glenn Williams was ejected in the bottom of the sixth inning of the final game of the series, for arguing against two consecutive calls that according to him were "questionable". Had either call been made the other way, Sydney would likely have scored the first run of the game. Perth scored in each of the remaining innings to win the game 4–1, and complete the sweep of the series locking the season series at 4–4.

6 January 2011 19:00 (UTC+11:00) at Blacktown Olympic Park, Sydney
Team	1	2	3	4	5	6	7	8	9	R	H	E
Perth	0	0	0	0	0	2	1	0	0	3	5	2
Sydney	0	0	0	0	0	1	0	0	0	1	6	3
WP: Trevor Caughey (1–0) LP: Chris Oxspring (4–1) Sv: Brendan Wise (1); Attendance: 1,282; Boxscore

7 January 2011 19:00 (UTC+11:00) at Blacktown Olympic Park, Sydney
Team	1	2	3	4	5	6	7	8	9	R	H	E
Perth	1	1	0	0	1	2	3	3	0	11	15	3
Sydney	0	1	3	0	1	0	0	0	2	7	9	1
WP: Daniel Schmidt (5–3) LP: Matthew Williams (0–2); Home runs: PER: Allan de San Miguel 2 (5); SYD: Alex Johnson (7); Attendance: 1,405; Boxscore

8 January 2011 19:00 (UTC+11:00) at Blacktown Olympic Park, Sydney
Team	1	2	3	4	5	6	7	8	9	R	H	E
Perth	0	1	0	0	0	0	3	0	0	4	8	0
Sydney	0	0	0	0	0	0	0	3	0	3	7	0
WP: Cole McCurry (1–1) LP: Wayne Lundgren (3–4) Sv: Brendan Wise (2); Attendance: 1,652; Boxscore

9 January 2011 13:30 (UTC+11:00) at Blacktown Olympic Park, Sydney
Team	1	2	3	4	5	6	7	8	9	R	H	E
Perth	0	0	0	0	0	0	1	1	2	4	11	2
Sydney	0	0	0	0	0	0	0	0	1	1	8	0
WP: Matt Zachary (1–1) LP: Craig Anderson (3–2); Home runs: PER: Luke Hughes (2); SYD: None; Attendance: 1,175; Boxscore

=== Round 9 ===
The Sydney Blue Sox hosted their final home series of the season, against the Adelaide Bite at Blacktown Olympic Park, Sydney. The Melbourne Aces and Perth Heat started their season series at the Melbourne Showgrounds. The Brisbane Bandits were scheduled to host the Canberra Cavalry at the Brisbane Exhibition Ground, however the ABL postponed the series as a result of widespread flooding in South East Queensland. At the time, a decision had not been made as to whether the games would be rescheduled, however it was announced approximately one week later that the games would be rescheduled to the Monday and Tuesday immediately following round 10 in the form of two doubleheaders, but only if either team had a chance of making the playoffs, and only the games required for one of the teams to qualify.

==== Sydney v Adelaide ====
For the third game in a row, Sydney allowed their opponents to get a 4-run lead before scoring themselves. However, in the first game of the series against Adelaide, the Blue Sox were able to snap a season-long 4-game losing streak through a walk off single from Trent Schmutter that drove in Mark Holland to win 5–4. Sydney regained first place in the league with a second consecutive win over the Bite 4–3. David Welch was credited with his 5th win of the season (6 innings pitched, 1 unearned run, 5 hits, 8 strikeouts), and Koo Dae-Sung earned his league leading 10th save (2 1/3 innings pitched, 1 unearned run, 2 hits, 3 strikeouts). For the second time in three games, Sydney recorded a walk-off win, beating Adelaide 6–5 in extra innings. Mark Holland's 2-run home run tied the game in the eighth inning, while in the tenth Alex Johnson doubled, then Michael Lysaught—pinch running for Johnson—scored on catcher Brandon Bantz's wild throw to third base to score the winning run. The Blue Sox secured the series sweep by beating the Bite 6–2 in their final home game of the regular season. The four runs driven in by Andrew Graham, Trent Schmutter and Alex Johnson in the fifth inning gave Sydney the lead for the rest of the game.

12 January 2011 19:30 (UTC+11:00) at Blacktown Olympic Park, Sydney
Team	1	2	3	4	5	6	7	8	9	R	H	E
Adelaide	0	1	0	1	2	0	0	0	0	4	12	1
Sydney	0	0	0	0	0	0	3	1	1	5	11	1
WP: Rich Thompson (1–0) LP: Tom Becker (0–1); Attendance: 1,187; Boxscore

13 January 2011 19:30 (UTC+11:00) at Blacktown Olympic Park, Sydney
Team	1	2	3	4	5	6	7	8	9	R	H	E
Adelaide	0	0	0	1	0	0	1	0	1	3	10	2
Sydney	1	2	0	0	0	1	0	0	X	4	8	2
WP: David Welch (5–0) LP: Paul Mildren (2–6) Sv: Koo Dae-Sung (10); Attendance: 1,145; Boxscore

14 January 2011 19:30 (UTC+11:00) at Blacktown Olympic Park, Sydney (F/10)
Team	1	2	3	4	5	6	7	8	9	10	R	H	E
Adelaide	0	2	0	0	0	2	1	0	0	0	5	14	2
Sydney	0	0	1	0	0	0	1	3	0	1	6	8	2
WP: Jarryd Sullivan (1–0) LP: Darren Fidge (3–3); Home runs: ADE: None; SYD: Mark Holland (1); Attendance: 1,640; Boxscore

15 January 2011 19:30 (UTC+11:00) at Blacktown Olympic Park, Sydney
Team	1	2	3	4	5	6	7	8	9	R	H	E
Adelaide	0	0	2	0	0	0	0	0	0	2	5	0
Sydney	2	0	0	0	4	0	0	0	X	6	9	2
WP: Wayne Lundgren (4–4) LP: Dushan Ruzic (5–2); Attendance: 1,655; Boxscore

==== Melbourne v Perth ====
14 January 2011 19:00 (UTC+11:00) at Melbourne Showgrounds
Team	1	2	3	4	5	6	7	8	9	R	H	E
Perth	3	0	1	0	0	4	1	4	0	13	15	2
Melbourne	7	0	1	0	1	0	0	0	0	9	8	1
WP: Cameron Lamb (3–0) LP: Adam Bright (2–3); Home runs: PER: Luke Hughes 2 (4), Robbie Widlansky (3), Ronnie Welty (6), Mitchell Graham (4); MEL: Justin Huber (7), Matthew Lawman (1), Elliot Biddle (1); Attendance: 836; Boxscore

15 January 2011 16:30 (UTC+11:00) at Melbourne Showgrounds
Team	1	2	3	4	5	6	7	R	H	E
Perth	2	1	6	0	2	4	0	15	15	0
Melbourne	0	4	1	0	0	1	0	6	7	3
WP: Cole McCurry (2–1) LP: Nicholas Martin (0–1); Home runs: PER: Evan McArthur (5), Mitchell Graham (5), Robbie Widlansky (4), Ronnie Welty (7), Tim Kennelly (2); MEL: Elliot Biddle (2), Justin Huber (8), Josh Davies (7); Notes: Scheduled as 7 innings. The first game of a doubleheader. Boxscore

15 January 2011 19:00 (UTC+11:00) at Melbourne Showgrounds
Team	1	2	3	4	5	6	7	8	9	R	H	E
Perth	3	0	1	0	4	4	0	0	4	16	20	1
Melbourne	0	7	1	0	0	0	0	0	0	8	13	3
WP: Benjamin Moore (1–0) LP: Russell Spear (0–2); Home runs: PER: Ronnie Welty 2 (9), Tim Kennelly (3), Lachlan Dale (1); MEL: None; Attendance: 1,723; Notes: The second game of a doubleheader. Boxscore

16 January 2011 19:00 (UTC+11:00) at Melbourne Showgrounds (F/7)
Team	1	2	3	4	5	6	7	8	9	R	H	E
Perth	3	0	7	0	0	0	2			12	14	0
Melbourne	0	0	0	0	0	0	2			2	7	0
WP: Matt Zachary (2–1) LP: Shane Lindsay (0–2); Home runs: PER: Luke Hughes (5), Tim Kennelly (4), Evan McArthur (6), Ryne Price (3), Ronnie Welty (10); MEL: Glenn Mascoll (1); Attendance: 266; Notes: Re-scheduled from 13 January. Boxscore

=== Round 10 ===
==== Adelaide v Brisbane ====
19 January 2011 19:00 (UTC+10:30) at Coopers Stadium, Adelaide
Team	1	2	3	4	5	6	7	8	9	R	H	E
Adelaide	0	0	2	0	0	1	0	0	3	6	7	1
Brisbane	0	0	0	1	0	0	0	0	0	1	6	1
WP: Mark Brackman (2–1) LP: James Albury (3–5); Home runs: ADE: Tom Brice (6); BRI: None; Attendance: 1,114; Notes: Re-scheduled from round 5. Boxscore

20 January 2011 15:00 (UTC+10:30) at Coopers Stadium, Adelaide (F/10)
Team	1	2	3	4	5	6	7	8	9	10	R	H	E
Adelaide	1	0	0	2	0	0	3	0	0	3	9	8	2
Brisbane	2	1	0	1	0	2	0	0	0	0	6	10	4
WP: Reed Brown (1–1) LP: Chris Mowday (6–3); Home runs: ADE: Brendon Pett (2); BRI: Wade Dutton (1), David Sutherland 2 (2), Ryan Battaglia (1); Notes: Re-scheduled from round 5 as the first game of a doubleheader for 7 innings. Boxscore

20 January 2011 19:00 (UTC+10:30) at Coopers Stadium, Adelaide (F/10)
Team	1	2	3	4	5	6	7	8	9	10	R	H	E
Brisbane	0	0	0	2	0	1	0	1	1	0	5	7	1
Adelaide	0	0	3	0	2	0	0	0	0	1	6	10	1
WP: Darren Fidge (4–3) LP: John Veitch (0–1); Home runs: BRI: Rory Rhodes 2 (5), Joshua Roberts (6); ADE: Brandon Bantz (7); Attendance: 1,103; Notes: The second game of a make-up doubleheader. Boxscore

21 January 2011 19:00 (UTC+10:30) at Coopers Stadium, Adelaide (F/7)
Team	1	2	3	4	5	6	7	8	9	R	H	E
Brisbane	0	0	0	0	0	0	0			0	1	0
Adelaide	0	5	1	4	2	0	X			12	10	0
WP: Brandon Maurer (5–1) LP: Josh Warner (0–1); Home runs: BRI: None; ADE: Stefan Welch (6), James McOwen (8), Brandon Bantz (8), Tom Brice (7); Attendance: 2,005; Boxscore

22 January 2011 15:00 (UTC+10:30) at Coopers Stadium, Adelaide
Team	1	2	3	4	5	6	7	R	H	E
Brisbane	4	0	2	1	1	0	4	12	12	0
Adelaide	0	0	3	0	1	4	0	8	12	3
WP: John Veitch (1–1) LP: Nick Talbot (0–1); Home runs: BRI: Joshua Roberts (7), Trent Baker (1), Mitchell Nilsson 2 (2); ADE: Jeremy Cresswell (5), James McOwen (9); Notes: Scheduled as 7 innings. The first game of a doubleheader. Boxscore

22 January 2011 19:00 (UTC+10:30) at Coopers Stadium, Adelaide
Team	1	2	3	4	5	6	7	8	9	R	H	E
Brisbane	1	0	0	0	0	0	0	1	0	2	6	0
Adelaide	1	0	0	3	0	0	0	1	X	5	7	0
WP: Darren Fidge (5–3) LP: Justin Erasmus (0–3) Sv: Tom Becker (3); Home runs: BRI: Trent Baker (2); ADE: James McOwen 2 (11), Scott Gladstone (2), Stefan Welch (7); Attendance: 1,950; Notes: The second game of a doubleheader. Boxscore

==== Canberra v Sydney ====
20 January 2011 19:00 (UTC+11:00) at Narrabundah Ballpark, Canberra
Team	1	2	3	4	5	6	7	8	9	R	H	E
Sydney	0	0	0	0	0	0	0	1	0	1	3	2
Canberra	1	0	1	0	3	0	0	0	X	5	9	2
WP: Lee Jung-Min (3–1) LP: Chris Oxspring (4–2) Sv: Tim Atherton (3); Home runs: SYD: None; CAN: Lee Seung-Hwa (2); Attendance: 1,104; Boxscore

21 January 2011 19:00 (UTC+11:00) at Narrabundah Ballpark, Canberra
Team	1	2	3	4	5	6	7	8	9	R	H	E
Sydney	0	0	0	0	2	0	0	2	6	10	13	3
Canberra	0	0	0	0	3	0	0	0	0	3	8	1
WP: Todd Grattan (1–0) LP: Hayden Beard (0–1) Sv: Koo Dae-Sung (11); Home runs: SYD: Michael Lysaught (4); CAN: None; Attendance: 1,412; Boxscore

22 January 2011 16:00 (UTC+11:00) at Narrabundah Ballpark, Canberra (F/8)
Team	1	2	3	4	5	6	7	8	R	H	E
Sydney	1	0	0	0	3	0	0	1	5	10	1
Canberra	0	1	0	0	2	1	0	0	4	9	1
WP: Koo Dae-Sung (2–1) LP: Tim Atherton (2–3); Home runs: SYD: Brendan Kingman (1); CAN: None; Notes: Scheduled as 7 innings. The first game of a doubleheader. Boxscore

22 January 2011 19:00 (UTC+11:00) at Narrabundah Ballpark, Canberra
Team	1	2	3	4	5	6	7	8	9	R	H	E
Sydney	1	0	0	1	0	0	0	1	1	4	9	0
Canberra	0	1	1	0	0	0	0	0	0	2	9	0
WP: Vaughan Harris (2–2) LP: Lee Jung-Min (3–2) Sv: Koo Dae-Sung (12); Home runs: SYD: Brendan Kingman (2); CAN: Michael Collins (3); Attendance: 1,320; Notes: The second game of a doubleheader. Boxscore

==== Perth v Melbourne ====
20 January 2011 19:00 (UTC+08:00) at Baseball Park, Perth
Team	1	2	3	4	5	6	7	8	9	R	H	E
Melbourne	2	0	0	0	0	2	0	0	1	5	15	0
Perth	0	0	0	0	0	0	0	0	0	0	4	0
WP: Tetsu Nishikawa (2–0) LP: Benjamin Moore (1–1); Home runs: MEL: Justin Huber (9); PER: None; Attendance: 1,290; Boxscore

21 January 2011 19:30 (UTC+08:00) at Baseball Park, Perth
Team	1	2	3	4	5	6	7	8	9	R	H	E
Melbourne	0	0	0	1	0	0	0	1	0	2	9	1
Perth	0	0	1	0	0	2	2	0	X	5	10	0
WP: Daniel Schmidt (6–3) LP: Jeff Jamnik (1–3) Sv: Brendan Wise (3); Home runs: MEL: None; PER: Matt Kennelly (2); Attendance: 2,314; Boxscore

22 January 2011 15:00 (UTC+08:00) at Baseball Park, Perth
Team	1	2	3	4	5	6	7	R	H	E
Melbourne	2	0	1	0	3	0	0	6	8	0
Perth	0	4	0	0	0	0	0	4	10	1
WP: Nicholas Martin (1–1) LP: Cameron Lamb (3–1); Home runs: MEL: None; PER: Evan McArthur (7); Notes: Scheduled for 7 innings. The first game of a doubleheader. Boxscore

22 January 2011 19:00 (UTC+08:00) at Baseball Park, Perth
Team	1	2	3	4	5	6	7	8	9	R	H	E
Melbourne	0	0	0	0	0	0	1	0	0	1	5	0
Perth	2	0	0	4	0	0	1	0	X	7	14	1
WP: Warwick Saupold (3–2) LP: Shane Lindsay (0–3); Home runs: MEL: None; PER: Ryne Price (4); Attendance: 1,999; Notes: The second game of a doubleheader. Boxscore

The season length was similar to the 2010 Claxton Shield by spreading ten rounds over twelve weeks, playing only the season's first game in the first week and taking a week off for Christmas and Boxing Day. Six teams were involved, playing a four-game series every week totaling two series against each team, one at home and one away. In total, the schedule allowed for 40 regular season games per team before a four-team finals series. During the regular season, games were played Thursday to Sunday, varying depending on the series and team, with 18 games scheduled as doubleheaders on a Saturday. Doubleheaders were scheduled to have the first of the two games shortened to seven innings, with the second game using the full nine innings.

One of the regular season games resulted in a tie, which is unusual in baseball given the provision in the rules of the game to play extra innings to determine a winner. The game between the Sydney Blue Sox and the Melbourne Aces at Blacktown Olympic Park was the second game of a makeup doubleheader as a result of rain earlier that weekend washing out two games, and so had been shortened to seven innings. A rain delay during the first game of the day forced the second game to a later start. Under a provision in the ABL rules that is modeled on the International Baseball Federation's tiebreaker rule, in any extra inning that starts within an hour of the curfew time for the game—a time set to allow the visiting team time to meet travel schedules to return home at the end of a series—each team starts with runners at first and second base with nobody out. In addition, no new inning may start within 15 minutes of the curfew time. The game was scoreless at the end of the regulation seven innings, and was tied at 1–1 at the end of the eighth inning, which ended at the curfew time. Though the game was an official game, the result did not count towards the season standings.

All but 4 of the scheduled 120 games were played. The four games that were not played were the series scheduled between the Brisbane Bandits and the Canberra Cavalry at the Brisbane Exhibition Ground for the ninth round. Flooding in Brisbane had resulted in the Exhibition Ground being used as an evacuation centre for affected residents. Initially the ABL postponed the series, leaving a decision as to whether the games would be rescheduled to a later time. Just prior to the final round of scheduled games, it was announced that the games would go ahead in the form of two doubleheaders, but that only games that would affect the playoffs would be played. When Brisbane lost the final game of their series against the Adelaide Bite, both they and Canberra were eliminated from contention for the playoffs; hence, the makeup games were not played.

Key
Clinched major semi final berth
Clinched minor semi final berth

2010–11 regular season standings
Team	W	L	Pct.	GB	Home	Road
Sydney Blue Sox	24	15	.615	–	12–7 (Note: The third game played between Sydney and Melbourne in round 4 was called a tie with a score of 1–1 under ABL rule 5-6-8. The result is not counted towards the teams' standings. A game postponed from round 4, held in round 5, was played with the Melbourne Aces as the away team and the Sydney Blue Sox as the home team, despite being played at the Melbourne Showgrounds.)	12–8
Perth Heat	24	16	.600	1/2	10–10	14–6
Adelaide Bite	23	17	.575	1 1/2	15–5	8–12 (Note: A game postponed from round 4, held in round 7, was played with the Adelaide Bite as the away team and the Canberra Cavalry as the home team, despite being played at Coopers Stadium, Adelaide.) (Note: Two games postponed from round 5, held in round 10, were played with the Adelaide Bite as the away team and the Brisbane Bandits as the home team, despite being played at Coopers Stadium, Adelaide.)
Melbourne Aces	18	21	.462	6	11–9	7–12
Brisbane Bandits	14	22	.389	8 1/2	6–10	8–12
Canberra Cavalry	12	24	.333	10 1/2	11–9	1–15

The Perth Heat and Sydney Blue Sox were the first teams to clinch positions in the finals series when Perth defeated the Melbourne Aces in the final game of their series in round 9. The Adelaide Bite were the next team to secure a place in the top four, after winning the third of an expanded six-game series against Brisbane. It was only on the final day of the regular season that Melbourne was able to claim the fourth finals position, and that the makeup of the semi-final series was decided: Sydney hosting Perth in the major semi-final series, and Adelaide hosting Melbourne in the minor semi-final series.

=== Statistical leaders ===
Batting leaders
Stat	Player (Note: Minimum 2.7 PAs per team game. Correct as of 23 January 2011.)	Team	Total
AVG	Michael Collins	Canberra Cavalry	.360
HR	James McOwen	Adelaide Bite	11
RBI	James McOwen Joshua Roberts	Adelaide Bite Brisbane Bandits	30
R	Jeremy Cresswell	Adelaide Bite	37
H	Robbie Widlansky	Perth Heat	52
SB	Trent D'Antonio	Sydney Blue Sox	9

Pitching leaders
Stat	Player (Note: Minimum 0.8 IP per team game. Correct as of 23 January 2011.)	Team	Total
W	Chris Mowday Daniel Schmidt	Brisbane Bandits Perth Heat	6
L	Paul Mildren	Adelaide Bite	6
ERA	David Welch	Sydney Blue Sox	1.44
K	Chris Oxspring	Sydney Blue Sox	71
IP	Chris Oxspring	Sydney Blue Sox	68 2/3
SV	Koo Dae-Sung	Sydney Blue Sox	12

== Postseason ==
2011 ABL Postseason logo

=== Format ===
At the conclusion of the regular season, the postseason involved the teams in a three-round structure. Each round consisted of a best-of-three-game series between the respective teams. The first- and second-place teams played each other in the major semi-final, the winner of which proceeded directly to the grand final and the loser to the preliminary final. The winner of the minor semi-final between the third- and fourth-place teams also qualified for the preliminary final, while the loser was eliminated. Likewise, the winner of the preliminary final qualified for the championship series, the loser being eliminated.

As in the finals series of previous Claxton Shield tournaments, though each series was hosted by a single team, the role of home team and away team alternated from game to game. For the second game in each series, the visiting team took the role of home team, fielding first, batting second, and wore their away uniform for the game.

=== Bracket ===
Semi-Final Series; 27–28 January 2011
1	Sydney Blue Sox	0
2	Perth Heat	2
3	Adelaide Bite	2
4	Melbourne Aces	0

Premliminary Final Series; 4–6 February 2011
1	Sydney Blue Sox	1
3	Adelaide Bite	2

Championship Series; 11–13 February 2011
2	Perth Heat	2
3	Adelaide Bite	1

==== Qualification ====
The Perth Heat and Sydney Blue Sox both clinched positions in the top four of the league at the same time: when Perth defeated the Melbourne Aces in the final game of their series at the Melbourne Showgrounds. The Adelaide Bite were the next team to secure a position in the finals, after winning the third of an expanded six-game series against the Brisbane Bandits at Coopers Stadium in Adelaide. Like Sydney, Melbourne secured fourth position through a result that did not involve them: Brisbane's loss in their final game against Adelaide eliminated them from contention for the finals, and since the Canberra Cavalry had already been eliminated by Melbourne's win in its second-last game, Melbourne qualified.

=== Major semi-final series ===
The Sydney Blue Sox hosted the Perth Heat in the major semi-final series at Blacktown Olympic Park. The Blue Sox and Heat split their season series 4–4. This included back-to-back sweeps for each team, with Perth winning the second of the two series, played in Sydney.

==== Game 1 ====
27 January 2011 19:30 (UTC+11:00) at Blacktown Olympic Park, Sydney
Team	1	2	3	4	5	6	7	8	9	R	H	E
Perth Heat	0	0	0	2	0	0	0	0	2	4	7	0
Sydney Blue Sox	0	0	0	0	0	0	2	0	0	2	4	1
WP: Benn Grice (1–0) LP: Chris Oxspring (0–1) Sv: Brendan Wise (1); Home runs: PER: Matt Kennelly (1); SYD: Brendan Kingman (1); Attendance: 1,002; Boxscore

==== Game 2 ====
28 January 2011 19:30 (UTC+11:00) at Blacktown Olympic Park, Sydney
Team	1	2	3	4	5	6	7	8	9	R	H	E
Sydney Blue Sox	0	0	0	0	0	0	0	0	0	0	7	1
Perth Heat	0	0	3	0	0	0	0	3	X	6	6	0
WP: Trevor Caughey (1–0) LP: Wayne Lundgren (0–1); Attendance: 1,350; Boxscore

=== Minor semi-final series ===
The Adelaide Bite hosted the Melbourne Aces in the minor semi-final series at Coopers Stadium. The Bite won their season series against the Aces 7–1. Adelaide swept Melbourne 4–0 in the season opening series in Adelaide.

==== Game 1 ====
27 January 2011 19:00 (UTC+10:30) at Coopers Stadium, Adelaide
Team	1	2	3	4	5	6	7	8	9	R	H	E
Melbourne Aces	0	0	0	0	2	0	0	0	0	2	7	0
Adelaide Bite	0	0	4	0	1	5	2	2	X	14	19	0
WP: Mark Brackman (1–0) LP: Tetsu Nishikawa (0–1); Home runs: MEL: Andrew Russell (1); ADE: Quincy Latimore 2 (2), Jeremy Cresswell (1), Stefan Welch (1); Attendance: 1,642; Boxscore

==== Game 2 ====
28 January 2011 19:00 (UTC+10:30) at Coopers Stadium, Adelaide (F/11)
Team	1	2	3	4	5	6	7	8	9	10	11	R	H	E
Adelaide Bite	0	0	1	0	2	0	0	0	0	0	1	4	8	2
Melbourne Aces	0	0	2	0	0	1	0	0	0	0	0	3	10	1
WP: Adrian Burnside (1–0) LP: Jeff Jamnik (0–1); Attendance: 3,124; Boxscore

=== Preliminary final series ===
==== Game 1 ====
4 February 2011 19:30 (UTC+11:00) at Blacktown Olympic Park, Sydney
Team	1	2	3	4	5	6	7	8	9	R	H	E
Adelaide Bite	0	0	0	0	0	0	0	0	0	0	0	0
Sydney Blue Sox	3	2	2	0	0	0	0	1	X	8	12	3
WP: David Welch (1–0) LP: Mark Brackman (1–1); Home runs: ADE: None; SYD: Trent D'Antonio (1); Attendance: 1,162; Boxscore

==== Game 2 ====
5 February 2011 19:30 (UTC+11:00) at Blacktown Olympic Park, Sydney
Team	1	2	3	4	5	6	7	8	9	R	H	E
Sydney Blue Sox	0	0	0	0	0	0	0	0	0	0	4	3
Adelaide Bite	0	0	0	1	2	0	1	0	X	4	13	0
WP: Brandon Maurer (1–0) LP: Wayne Lundgren (0–2); Attendance: 1,515; Boxscore

==== Game 3 ====
6 February 2011 13:30 (UTC+11:00) at Blacktown Olympic Park, Sydney (F/15)
Team	1	2	3	4	5	6	7	8	9	10	11	12	13	14	15	R	H	E
Adelaide Bite	0	0	0	0	1	3	0	0	0	0	0	0	0	0	3	7	15	1
Sydney Blue Sox	0	0	0	0	2	0	2	0	0	0	0	0	0	0	0	4	15	3
WP: Mark Brackman (2–1) LP: Koo Dae-Sung (0–1); Attendance: 742; Boxscore

=== Championship series ===
==== Game 1 ====
11 February 2011 16:10 (UTC+08:00) at Baseball Park, Perth
Team	1	2	3	4	5	6	7	8	9	R	H	E
Adelaide Bite	0	0	1	0	3	0	0	0	0	4	11	1
Perth Heat	1	0	0	0	0	2	0	0	0	3	14	0
WP: Mark Brackman (3–1) LP: Daniel Schmidt (0–1) Sv: Tom Becker (1); Attendance: 2,680; Boxscore

==== Game 2 ====
12 February 2011 16:10 (UTC+08:00) at Baseball Park, Perth
Team	1	2	3	4	5	6	7	8	9	R	H	E
Perth Heat	0	0	0	0	8	0	0	1	0	9	13	0
Adelaide Bite	0	0	1	0	0	0	0	1	0	2	7	1
WP: Trevor Caughey (2–0) LP: Brandon Maurer (1–1); Home runs: PER: Ronnie Welty 2 (2); ADE: None; Attendance: 3,074; Boxscore

==== Game 3 ====
13 February 2011 12:10 (UTC+08:00) at Baseball Park, Perth
Team	1	2	3	4	5	6	7	8	9	R	H	E
Adelaide Bite	0	0	0	0	0	0	0	0	1	1	4	0
Perth Heat	0	0	0	0	3	0	0	4	0	7	8	1
WP: Benjamin Moore (1–0) LP: Paul Mildren (0–1); Home runs: ADE: Stefan Welch (2); PER: Robbie Widlansky (1); Attendance: 1,876; Boxscore

=== Broadcasting ===
On 25 January 2011, it was announced that Fox Sports would broadcast live coverage of the championship series. Warren Smith provided the play-by-play commentary, and was joined by Jon Deeble, manager of the Australia national baseball team, for colour commentary.

== Awards ==
Player of the Week
Round	Player	Team	Ref
1	Not awarded		
2	Alex Johnson	Sydney Blue Sox	
3	Allan de San Miguel	Perth Heat	
4	Donald Lutz	Canberra Cavalry	
5	Yoshiyuki Kamei	Melbourne Aces	
6	Boss Moanoroa Yoshiyuki Kamei	Sydney Blue Sox Melbourne Aces	
7	Not awarded		
8	Tom Brice	Adelaide Bite	
9	Ronnie Welty	Perth Heat	
10	James McOwen	Adelaide Bite	

Pitcher of the Week
Round	Player	Team	Ref
1	Not awarded		
2	Chris Oxspring	Sydney Blue Sox	
3	David Welch	Sydney Blue Sox	
4	Wayne Lundgren	Sydney Blue Sox	
5	Adam Bright	Melbourne Aces	
6	David Welch Adam Blackley	Sydney Blue Sox Melbourne Aces	
7	Not awarded		
8	Matt Zachary	Perth Heat	
9	Benjamin Moore	Perth Heat	
10	Koo Dae-Sung Brandon Maurer	Sydney Blue Sox Adelaide Bite	

Season awards
Award	Player	Team	Ref
Helms Award (League MVP)	James McOwen	Adelaide Bite	
Championship Series MVP	Benjamin Moore	Perth Heat	
Golden Glove	Didi Gregorius	Canberra Cavalry	
Pitcher of the Year	David Welch	Sydney Blue Sox	
Reliever of the Year	Koo Dae-Sung	Sydney Blue Sox	
Rookie of the Year	Trent Schmutter	Sydney Blue Sox	
Silver Slugger	James McOwen	Adelaide Bite	
