= Adam Blackley =

Australian baseball player (born 1985)

- Pitcher
- Born: 22 February 1985 (age 40); Melbourne, Australia
- Bats: Left Throws: Left
- Stats at Baseball Reference

Adam Blackley (born 22 February 1985 in Melbourne) is a former Australian pitcher. He is the brother of Travis Blackley.

== Career ==
In 2003, Blackley was signed to the Boston Red Sox by Australia national baseball team manager Jon Deeble. He made his debut with the GCL Red Sox that year and allowed only 13 hits in 24^{2/3} IP, posting a remarkable 0.73 ERA. In 2004, he was promoted and posted 4–3 with a 3.39 ERA for the Augusta GreenJackets but pitched with less success for the Lowell Spinners (0–1, 7.71). The next year, he was 6–3, 4.01 ERA with Lowell and was promoted to the Greenville Drive (2–7, 6.15) for the rest of the season. In 2006, the southpaw was limited an injury to his elbow and spent his year back down with the GCL Red Sox (3.86) and Wilmington Blue Rocks (0–2, 4.64). He made his debut for the national team in the 2006 Intercontinental Cup and performed well, not allowing any runs in 12 innings. He led the tournament with the lowest ERA and made the All-Star team as the top left-handed pitcher.

In 2007, Adam worked out of the bullpen for Lowell (2–2, 4.70) and Greenville (1–0, 6.75). Blackley again starred in international play in the 2007 Baseball World Cup and was 1–0 with a 1.42 ERA, allowing just one run in six-plus innings against the South Korea national baseball team and allowing one run in six against the Mexico national baseball team in a quarterfinals victory.

Travis pitched poorly against Mexico in 2008 for the Olympic Qualification Tournament, he left with a no-decision but Australia lost when Adam Bright struggled to relieve. Australia failed to qualify for the 2008 Olympics.

He was then released by Boston and then signed with the El Paso Diablos, going 7–9 with a 4.98 ERA. That winter, he went 4–1 with a 3.95 ERA for the Victoria Aces in the 2009 Claxton Shield. Blackley was on the provisional Australian roster for the 2009 World Baseball Classic but did not make the final cut.

He signed with the Amsterdam Pirates for 2009. In the 2009 European Cup Nettuno phase, Blackley went 1–0, tossing 7 shutout innings against Caffè Danesi Nettuno. He was Amsterdam's Opening Day starter on 11 April. He allowed only 3 hits in 7 shutout innings for a win over Kinheim, which had won two of the three prior titles. In the final four of the 2009 European Cup, Blackley was credited with a loss to Fortitudo Bologna.

Blackley was announced for the roster of the Melbourne Aces for the Australian Baseball League's inaugural 2010–11 season.
