= Brassington (surname) =

Brassington is an English surname. Notable people with the surname include:

- Andrew Brassington (born 1954), English cricketer
- Christian Brassington (born 1983), English actor
- Isaac Brassington (1870–1932), British trade unionist and activist
- Pat Brassington (born 1942), Australian artist
- Phil Brassington (born 1970), Australian baseball player
- Samuel Brassington (1901–1950), Australian politician
- William Brassington (1837/1841 – 1905), New Zealand stonemason, sculptor and builder
