= James Albury =

Australian pitcher (born 1986)

Brisbane Bandits – No. 12
- Starting pitcher
- Born: 1 April 1986 (age 40); Brisbane, Australia
- Bats: Left Throws: Right

ABL debut
- 11 November, 2010, for the Brisbane Bandits

ABL statistics (through 2011)
- Win–loss record: 3–5
- Earned run average: 6.12
- Strikeouts: 21
- Stats at Baseball Reference

James Albury (born 1 April 1986 in Brisbane, Queensland) is an Australian pitcher for the Brisbane Bandits and the Oakland County Cruisers.

== Career ==
Albury was signed as a 17-year-old to the Boston Red Sox by Jon Deeble in 2003. He played two seasons with the GCL Red Sox going 5–0 with a 1.15 ERA in his first season. However, James struggled in his second season putting up 2–2 with a 4.83 ERA and was released at the end of 2005. James continued baseball in Australia with the Queensland Rams and played in the Greater Brisbane League with the Redlands Rays before playing in the Frontier League with the Midwest Sliders in 2008 making the Frontier League East All-Star team. In his second season with the Sliders, Albury was signed by Chicago Whitesox and played one season with their affiliate, the Kannapolis Intimidators, posting 5–2 with a 4.79 ERA.

In 2010, Albury went back to the Frontier League, but with Oakland County. He was then named in the inaugural Bandits team for the 2010–11 Australian Baseball League season. James had the honour of starting the first ever Brisbane game since the previous Brisbane Bandits in 1998. In a tight contest against the Perth Heat, he threw 5 innings for 4 hits ending in a no decision for him. Albury started in all nine series for the Bandits, but failed to control the ball in the later parts of the season landing him a 3–5 record with a 6.12 ERA.
