= Josh Roberts =

Josh Roberts may refer to:

- Joshua Roberts (born 1986), Australian baseball and rugby league player
- Josh Roberts (athlete), American Paralympic athlete, see United States at the 2012 Summer Paralympics
