= Josh Davies (disambiguation) =

Josh Davies may refer to:

- Josh Davies (musician), Vocalist for Ingested
- Josh Davies, Australian baseball player
