= Kaneto =

Kaneto (written: 金刃, 金戸 or 兼人) is both a Japanese surname and a masculine Japanese given name. Notable people with the name include:

Surname:

- Norihito Kaneto (金刃 憲人) (born 1984), Japanese baseball player
- Rie Kaneto (金藤 理絵) (born 1988), Japanese swimmer
- Shunsuke Kaneto (金戸 俊介) (born 1940), Japanese diver

Given name:

- Kaneto Shindo (新藤 兼人) (1912–2012), Japanese film director
- Kaneto Shiozawa (塩沢 兼人) (1954–2000), Japanese voice actor
