= Tom Becker (baseball) =

Australian baseball pitcher (born 1975)

Thomas Becker
Personal information
- Born: 13 January 1975 (age 51) Adelaide, South Australia, Australia

Sport
- Country: Australia
- Sport: Baseball

Thomas Becker (born 13 January 1975) is an Australian former baseball pitcher. He competed at the 2000 Summer Olympics. He also played for the Adelaide Bite in the 2010–11 season.
