= Wade Dutton =

Australian baseball player (born 1986)

Pine Rivers Rapids – No. 3
- Utility
- Born: 23 September 1986 (age 39); Brisbane, Queensland
- Bats: Right Throws: Right

ABL statistics (through February 7, 2021)
- Batting average: .272
- Runs batted in: 104
- Home runs: 22

Wade Dutton (born 23 September 1986) is an Australian professional baseball utility player for the Brisbane Bandits of the Australian Baseball League.

== Career ==
Dutton played alongside his brother Brad Dutton in the Queensland Rams, debuting in the 2008 Claxton Shield before the inaugural Australian Baseball League season when they began playing for the Brisbane Bandits. Following the 2011–12 season, he was left off the roster due to injury, but continued playing in the Greater Brisbane League for Redcliffe Padres, Ipswich Musketeers and Pine Rivers Rapids.

He made it back on the team for the 2016–17 Australian Baseball League season and has continued to be a part of the team through 2019, being part of three of the four Bandits consecutive championships

Dutton was selected as a member of the Australia national baseball team for the 2019 WBSC Premier12.
