= Paul Rutgers =

Australian baseball player

- Second baseman / Third baseman
- Born: 17 January 1984 (age 42); Melbourne, Australia
- Bats: Right Throws: Right
- Stats at Baseball Reference

Paul Martin Rutgers (born 17 January 1984) is an Australian and South African baseball player who played with the Minnesota Twins organisation and both South Africa and Australia.

== Career ==
Rutgers was signed by the Twins in 2001 and debuted in the minor leagues in 2002 with the GCL Twins, hitting .244/.270/.267 in 31 games as a backup 2B to José Morales. He made his Claxton Shield debut in the 2003 Claxton Shield for the Victoria Aces.

In the Gulf Coast League in 2003 he was hitting .353/.388/.443 for the Twins, second in the GCL in average. He was named to the GCL All-Star team as a second baseman. He played again for Victoria in the 2004 Claxton Shield.

He was playing for the Swing of the Quad Cities in a pretty dismal 2004 season, getting better back home in the 2005 Claxton Shield, batting .393/.379/.464 and winning the Batting Award. In his final year with the Twins, he batted .230/.304/.291 for the Beloit Snappers.

Paul then made his debut for the Australian senior team in the 2005 Baseball World Cup. He hit an impressive .385/.385/.538 as Australia's starting left fielder. In the 2006 Claxton Shield, the Victoria native hit .333/.394/.533 with 6 RBI in 7 games. Rutgers made the Australian roster for the 2006 World Baseball Classic but only got to bat twice in the tournament, after being put in as a pinch hitter for Tom Brice against the Dominican Republic picking up a hit

That summer, Rutgers hit .285/.361/.423 for the independent Chillicothe Paints. Rutgers completed his busy year with the Australian national team once again, batting .231/.267/.269 for them in the 2006 Intercontinental Cup as their starting right fielder. He stole 4 bases in 4 attempts, leading the Cup in steals.

In the 2007 Claxton Shield, Paul batted .296/.406/.481 to help Victoria win the Shield; he won the second base Gold Glove. Back with Chillicothe, Rutgers hit .254/.346/.387 with 22 doubles. Rutgers played well again in the 2008 Claxton Shield, hitting .319/.429/.489 with 15 runs in 12 games to lead the tournament in runs scored.

Rutgers was on South Africa's roster for the 2009 World Baseball Classic. In the Classic, he went one for eight but got South Africa's lone extra-base hit, a double off of Mexico's Elmer Dessens.

End of May 2010 he signed a contract in Germany and now plays at the Solingen Alligators (1. Bundesliga Northern league).
