= Nick Kimpton =

Australian baseball player

Olympic medal record

Men's Baseball
Silver medal – second place	2004 Athens	Team competition

Nick Kimpton (born 27 October 1983) is an Australian former baseball player.

In 2004, he was part of the Australian Olympic baseball team who achieved a silver medal in the baseball tournament at the Athens Olympics.

He signed with the Anaheim Angels in 2001.

In 2009, he returned to international competition, when he was selected for Australia at the 2009 Baseball World Cup.

Kimpton last played for the Canberra Cavalry in the Australian Baseball League's inaugural 2010-11 season where he hit .234 in 34 games. as did Chris Kimpton.
