= Brad Dutton =

Australian baseball player (born 1982)

- Third basemen
- Born: 11 May 1982 (age 44); Brisbane, Australia
- Bats: Right Throws: Right

ABL debut
- 11 November, 2010, for the Brisbane Bandits

ABL statistics
- Batting average: .253
- Home runs: 6
- Runs batted in: 67
- Stats at Baseball Reference

Career highlights and awards
- 2006 Claxton Shield Helms Award

Brad Daniel Dutton (born 11 May 1982 in Brisbane, Queensland) is an Australian former professional baseball player. Dutton played for the Brisbane Bandits and Queensland Rams, where in the 2006 Claxton Shield he won the Helms Award, given to Most Valuable Player.

He is the elder brother of current Brisbane Bandits and Australia national baseball team player Wade Dutton.

== Professional career ==
Dutton made his debut in the 2003 Claxton Shield with the Queensland Rams, batting .333 at second base. In 2004, he played with Creighton University and hit .325 and improved to .335/.377/.459 in his second season at Creighton. Brad then starred in the 2006 Claxton Shield, going 15 for 28 (.536) for Queensland with 3 doubles, a triple and home run in 6 games steering Queensland to a Claxton Shield win and a Helms Award.

In 2006, he played for the Rockford RiverHawks in the independent Frontier League and hit .217/.269/.286. In the 2007 Claxton Shield, he was less impressive batting at a .292/.292/.333 clip for Queensland. He returned to Rockford for the summer and batted .288/.370/.384 in 83 games. This included a 20 steals in 26 attempts.

For the 2008 Claxton Shield with the Rams, Dutton hit .310/.420/.429 in 12 games and stole 4 bases in 4 tries. He played for the Australia national baseball team in the 2008 Final Olympic Qualification Tournament, replacing Reading Phillies shortstop, Brad Harman while he was busy at spring training. Unfortunately in his national debut, Dutton was just 2 for 19 with three errors as Australia failed to qualify for the 2008 Olympics.

Dutton returned to Rockford for a third season in 2008 and batted .311, narrowly missing out on the top 10 in the Frontier League for average. For 2009, Brad signed with the Gauting Indians in Germany. He debuted in the Bundesliga on 5 April, going 4 for 8 with a run, double, 2 RBI and a steal.

He continued his Claxton Shield career with the formation of the Australian Baseball League in 2010 and was an everyday player for the Brisbane Bandits until the 2013–14 Australian Baseball League season. In four seasons with the Bandits he hit .253/.299/.321 in 162 games, leaving him the eighth most capped Bandits player as of 2019.

Following his ABL career, Dutton continued to play for the Redcliffe Padres and then Ipswich Musketeers in the Greater Brisbane League, before retiring in 2019.
