= Trent Baker =

Australian baseball player (1990–2016)

- Pitcher
- Born: 14 June 1990; Brisbane, Australia
- Died: 13 March 2016 (aged 25); Brisbane, Australia
- Batted: Right Threw: Left

ABL debut
- 30 December, 2010, for the Brisbane Bandits

ABL statistics
- Win–loss record: 0–0
- Earned run average: 7.36
- Strikeouts: 3

Trent Baker (14 June 1990 – 13 March 2016) was an Australian pitcher and outfielder for the Brisbane Bandits organisation.

== Career ==
Baker was signed as an outfielder by the Cleveland Indians in 2007 through MLBAAP. In Australia, he debuted for the Queensland Rams in the 2008 Claxton Shield as a 17-year-old.

He spent 2009 and 2010 with the Cleveland organisation, playing with five different teams from rookie league to Double-A. He totaled a .200 average over 111 at bats. Baker led the 2009 AZL Rookie League in outfield assists with 14, was 7th in the league in hits, 10th in the league in stolen bases. Baker was promoted to the Midwest A-League in his first professional season at the age of 19.

Baker also represented Australia in Osaka, Japan for the 2009 Friendship Games.

He was called up to the Brisbane Bandits active roster on 30 December 2010, when he debuted in centerfield against the Melbourne Aces, going 2–5. He finished the 2010–11 Australian Baseball League season batting .200, identical to his minor league batting average. He was released by the Indians after 2010 spring training.

Trent was resigned as a pitcher in July by the Braves. He pitched his first professional game for the Bandits on 5 November 2011, allowing 3 runs over 3.2 innings in relief.

== Death ==
Baker died unexpectedly on Sunday, March 13, 2016 at the age of 25. Only hours before he was due to play for the Windsor Royals in a Greater Brisbane League preliminary final game against the Carina Tigers.
