= Hiroki Yamada (baseball) =

Japanese baseball player (born 1988)

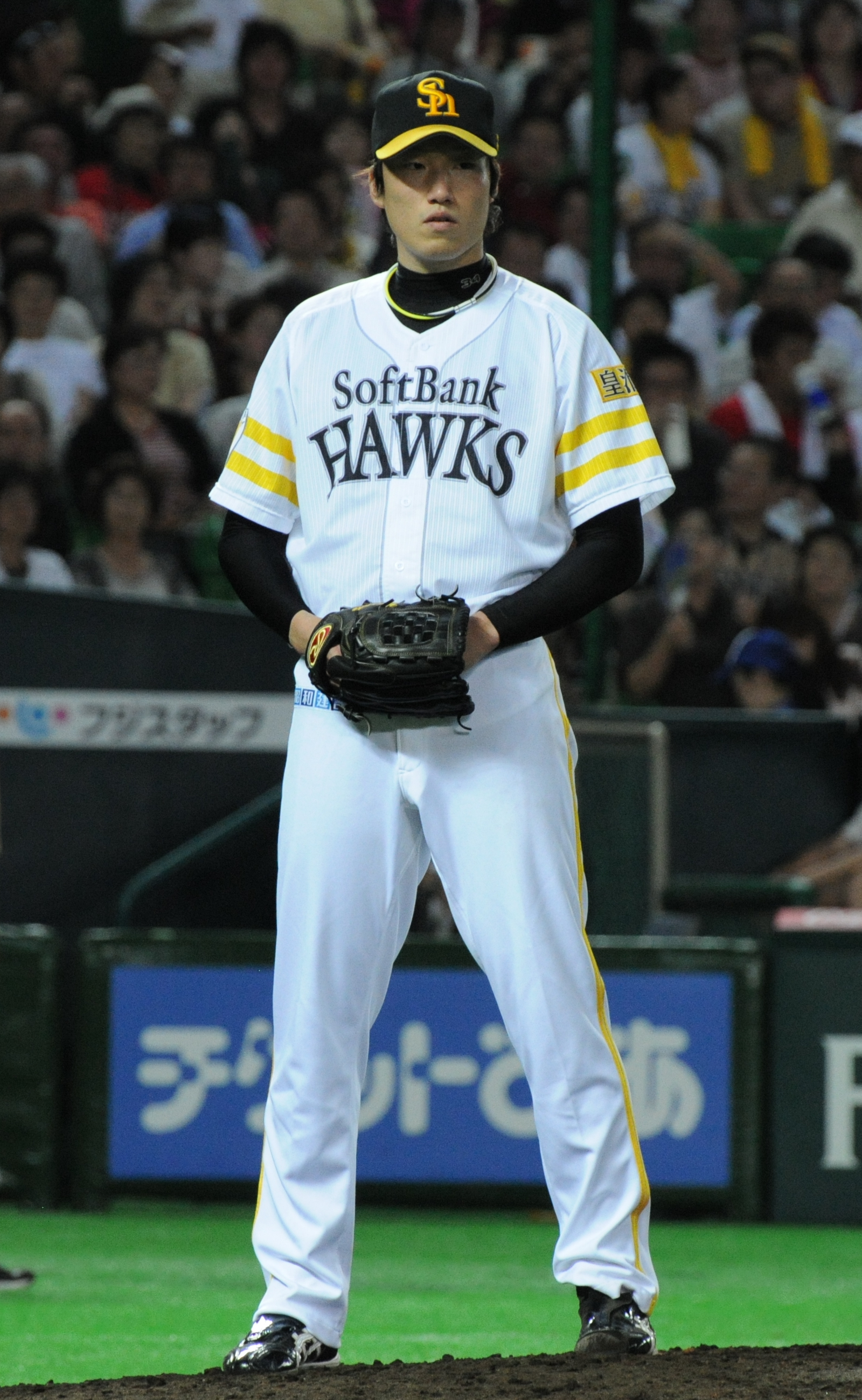
- Yamada with the Fukuoka SoftBank Hawks

Free agent
- Pitcher
- Born: July 30, 1988 (age 37); Tsukuba, Ibaraki, Japan
- Bats: Left Throws: Left

NPB debut
- June 10, 2010, for the Fukuoka SoftBank Hawks

NPB statistics (through 2020 season)
- Win–loss record: 29–33
- Earned run average: 3.73
- Strikeouts: 276
- Stats at Baseball Reference

Teams
- Fukuoka SoftBank Hawks (2007–2017); Tokyo Yakult Swallows (2018–2020)

Hiroki Yamada (山田 大樹; born July 30, 1988) is a Japanese former professional baseball left-handed pitcher who is a free agent. He has previously played in Nippon Professional Baseball (NPB) for the Fukuoka SoftBank Hawks and Tokyo Yakult Swallows.

== Career ==
Yamada played his first season in the NPB with the Hawks going 4-4 and a 4.60 ERA, striking out 44 over 59 innings. At the end of the season he joined the Brisbane Bandits inaugural roster and was reported to try to learn a slow curve during the season. Throughout the 2010-11 Australian Baseball League season, Yamada had been impressive for the Bandits with a 2-1, 3.00 ERA record, including 30 strikeouts over as many innings until in his last game against the Melbourne Aces where he let in 8 earned runs over 3 innings at the very batter friendly Royal Melbourne Showgrounds, blowing out his ERA to 4.91.

Yamada pitched his first shutout for the Hawks on May 20, 2011 over the Hanshin Tigers, letting in only 4 hits over 9 innings of work. He finished the 2011 regular season 7-7 with a 2.85 ERA. In the 2011 postseason, Hiroki picked up the win in Game 5 of the Japan Series, throwing 6 shutout innings. The Hawks would go on to win the Series against the Chunichi Dragons 4-3.

On November 11, 2017, the Fukuoka SoftBank Hawks traded Yamada to the Tokyo Yakult Swallows for free of charge.

On December 2, 2020, Yamada became a free agent.
