= Masumi Hoshino =

Japanese baseball player

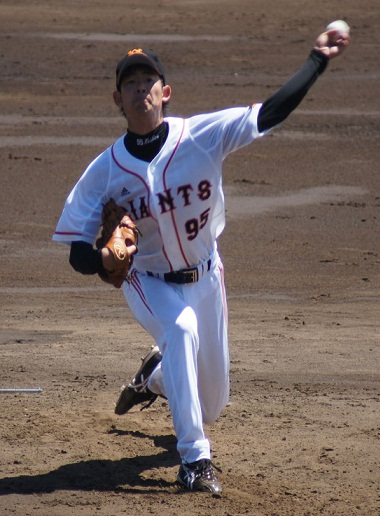
- Pitcher
- Born: April 4, 1984 (age 42); Saitama, Saitama, Japan
- Bats: Left Throws: Left

NPB debut
- 2010, for the Yomiuri Giants

NPB statistics (through 2012)
- Win–loss record: 1-0
- Earned run average: 4.37
- Strikeouts: 32
- Stats at Baseball Reference

Teams
- Shinano Grandserows (2009); Yomiuri Giants (2010–2012)

Masumi Hoshino (星野 真澄, born April 4, 1984, in Saitama, Saitama) is a Japanese former professional baseball pitcher in Japan's Nippon Professional Baseball. He played with the Yomiuri Giants from 2010 to 2012. Before joining the Giants in 2010, he pitched for the Shinano Grandserows of the Baseball Challenge League.
