= Adam Bright =

Australian baseball player (born 1984)

- Pitcher
- Born: 11 August 1984 (age 42); Melbourne, Australia
- Bats: Left Throws: Left
- Stats at Baseball Reference

Adam Bright (born 11 August 1984, in Melbourne) is an Australian former left-handed baseball pitcher. He is son of ex-star Australian spin bowler Ray Bright.

== Career ==
Bright signed with the Colorado Rockies in 2002 at the age of 17 after a strong performance at the 2002 Junior World Championships. He debuted with the Casper Rockies in 2003 and led the Pioneer League with most games pitched.

In 2004, he debuted for the Victoria Aces in the Claxton Shield and later that year played A- ball with the Tri-City Dust Devils. In 2005, Bright had his first full-season with a 4–2 record including 6 saves and a 3.38 ERA in 51 games for the Asheville Tourists.

Bright made his debut with Australia's senior national team in the 2005 Baseball World Cup, with a win against the Czech Republic and a 1.50 ERA in four games. He also made one appearance against Italy in the 2006 World Baseball Classic. Bright also played for Australia in the 2007 Baseball World Cup and the 2009 World Baseball Classic, and was selected for the 2009 Baseball World Cup.

In 2009, he played AA with the Tulsa Drillers and is often brought on as a LOOGY. He was also the shortest pitcher on the Drillers roster at 5'11". In 2010, he was released by the Rockies and played in the Italian Baseball League with Telemarket Rimini before moving back to Australia to play for the Melbourne Aces in the Australian Baseball League. In the 2010-11 Australian Baseball League season he pitched 2–3 with a 3.12 ERA including two saves.

In 2011, he was signed to the Aces sister team, the Yomiuri Giants. In three relief appearances he finished his Nippon Professional Baseball career with a 2.45 ERA.

Bright finished his professional career with the Aces during the 2013-14 season where in two starts he held an ERA of 29.70.

== Awards and honors ==
2008	TEX Mid-Season All-Star
