= Blacktown Baseball Stadium =

Baseball facility in Sydney, Australia

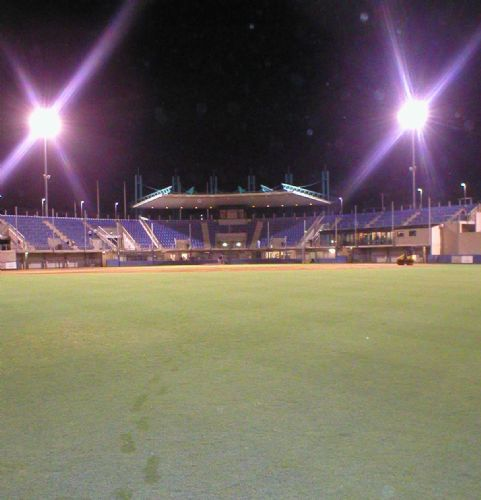
- Interactive map of Blacktown Baseball Stadium
- Location: Sydney, Australia
- Coordinates: 33°46′14″S 150°51′19″E
- Operator: Blacktown Venue Management Ltd
- Capacity: 3,000
- Surface: Grass
- Field size: Left Field - 322 feet (98 m); Center Field - 402 feet (123 m); Right Field - 320 feet (98 m)

Construction
- Opened: 1999

Tenant
- Sydney Blue Sox

Blacktown Baseball Stadium is a baseball facility located in Rooty Hill, a suburb in Sydney, Australia.

== Description ==
The Blacktown Baseball Stadium was built for the Sydney 2000 Olympic Games as the secondary baseball stadium. The stadium is now home to Baseball NSW and hosted the Claxton Shield between 2002 and 2006. It also hosted the showcase round of the 2009 Claxton Shield.

It is also home for the Sydney Blue Sox competing in the Australian Baseball League, who commenced their first season in November 2010.

== See also ==
- Blacktown International Sportspark
