= Rory Rhodes =

- First baseman
- Born: 28 July 1991 (age 35); Brisbane, Australia
- Bats: Right Throws: Right
- Stats at Baseball Reference

Rory Elias Rhodes (born 28 July 1991) is an Australian former professional baseball infielder. He has played for the Minnesota Twins organisation and for the Brisbane Bandits in Australia. Rhodes is one of the tallest players in the Australian Baseball League and the tallest position player at 208 cm (6 ft 10 in) and although primarily is a third baseman, plays first base regularly.

Rhodes has represented his country at both Australia U17 and Australia U19 levels. He has also played for the Queensland Rams in the Claxton Shield and in 2007 won Rams Junior Player of the Year.

In his first season with the Bandits, he finished with 5 home-runs and slugging .514 and was runner-up for the 2010–11 seasons Rookie of the Year behind Trent Schmutter of the Sydney Blue Sox.

Rory's older brother Ricky also briefly played in the Cincinnati Reds minor league system as a pitcher.
