= Stefan Welch =

Australian baseball player

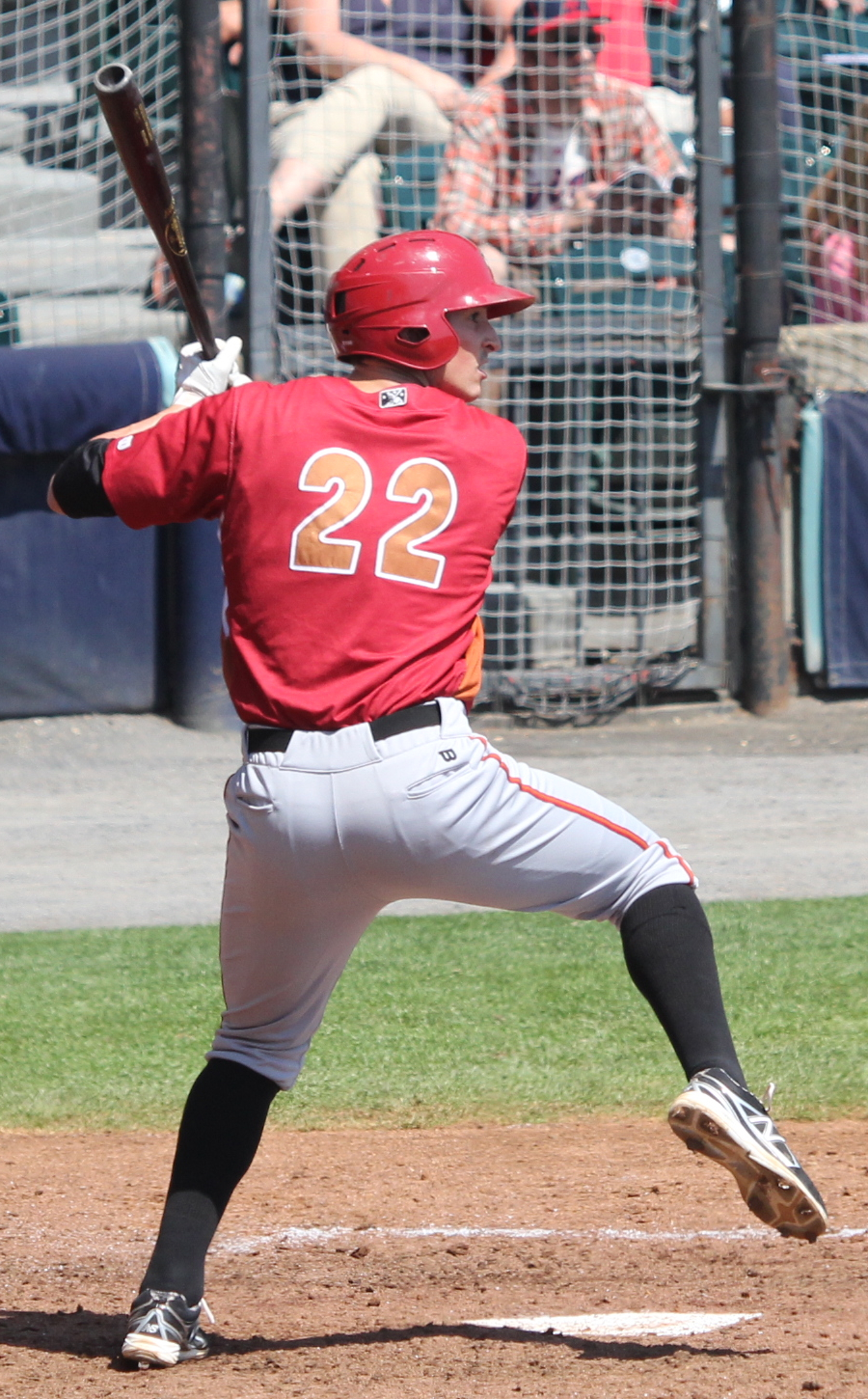
- Welch batting for the Altoona Curve, double-A affiliates of the Pittsburgh Pirates, in 2013

Adelaide Bite – No. 26
- Third baseman / First baseman
- Born: 12 August 1988 (age 38); Adelaide, Australia
- Bats: Left Throws: Right
- Stats at Baseball Reference

Stefan Robert Welch (born 12 August 1988 in Adelaide, Australia) is an Australian professional baseball first baseman for the Adelaide Bite of the Australian Baseball League. He Had played for the New York Mets, Pittsburgh Pirates and Boston Red Sox organisations.

== Professional career ==
=== New York Mets ===
He was scouted by Australian national coach Tony Harris in 2005 and eventually signed with the New York Mets in 2005 at the age of 16. In 2006, Welch made his Claxton Shield debut for the South Australia Bite where he went 0 for 1 with 3 walks. He made his pro debut in 2007 for the GCL Mets where he batted .288 in his first season. In 2009, he was twice selected for the Australia national baseball team; in March for the 2009 World Baseball Classic, and again in September for the 2009 Baseball World Cup. Welch spent the 2010 and 2011 seasons with the Class A-Advanced St. Lucie Mets.

=== Pittsburgh Pirates ===
The Pittsburgh Pirates signed Welch in November 2011. He began the season with the Bradenton Marauders. In his first game with the Marauders, which was against St. Lucie, Welch was hit by a Ryan Fraser pitch with the bases loaded in the bottom of the 11th inning, to score Gift Ngoepe and give the Marauders a walk-off win. Welch's first promotion to Double-A came in June 2012, when he was promoted to the Double-A Altoona Curve. In November 2012, Welch re-signed with the Pirates.

=== Boston Red Sox ===
Welch was traded to the Boston Red Sox in early June 2013, starting with the High A Salem Red Sox. He then got promoted to AA in March 2014 and played the season in Portland, Maine.

=== Adelaide Bite ===
Welch played for the Adelaide Bite of the Australian Baseball League (ABL) from 2010 to 2017. After missing the 2017-18 season, Welch returned to the Bite for the 2018-19 season. After the conclusion of the season, Welch announced his retirement, leading the club in all time in games (284), hits (258), runs (160), home runs (35) and RBI (169)

== Personal ==
Stefan attended Norwood Morialta High School and graduated in 2006 He also played cricket, football, and basketball for local Adelaide clubs and school teams. He still currently plays Division 1 Baseball for the Goodwood Indians
