= Jumpei Ono =

Japanese baseball player

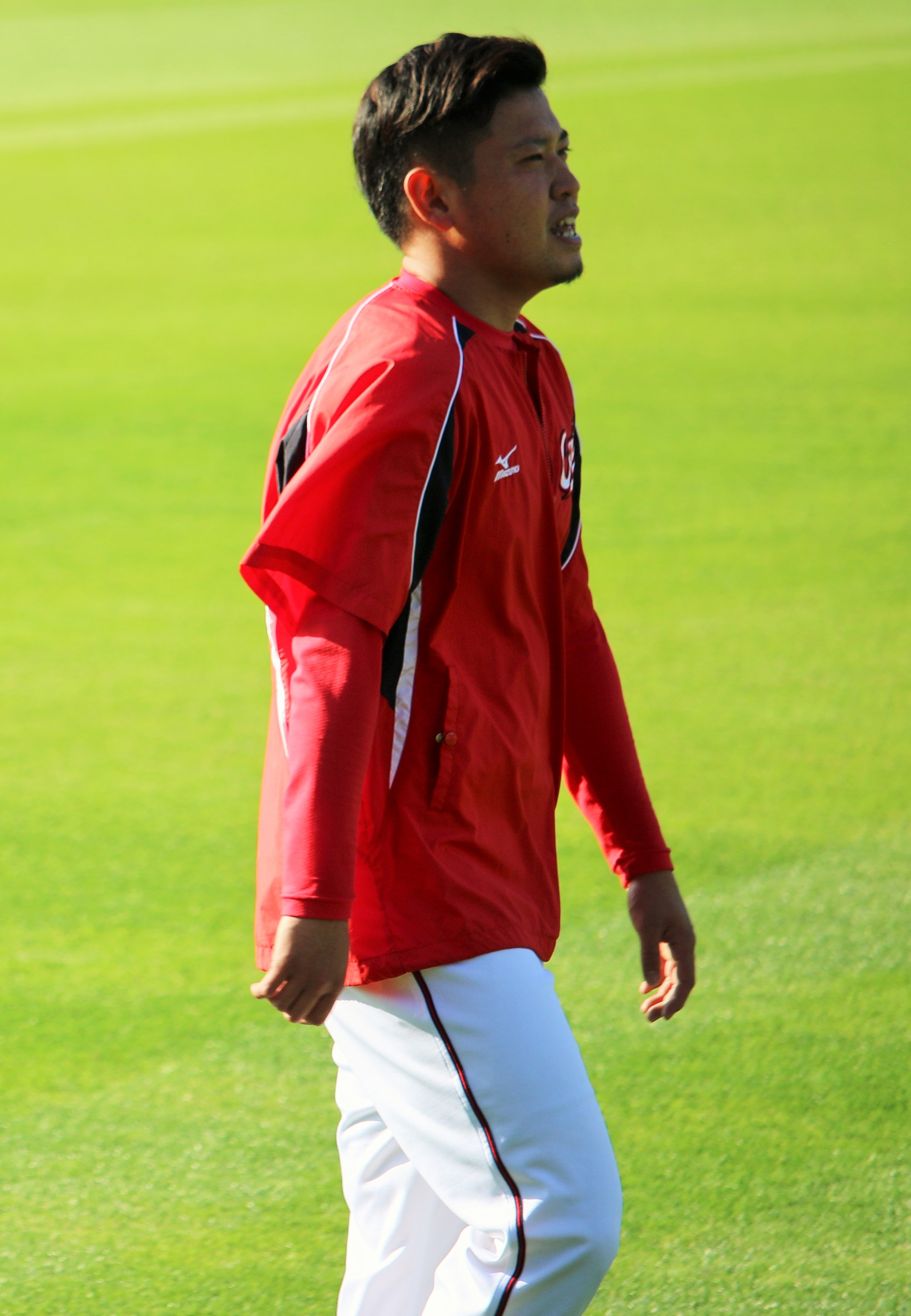
- Ono with the Hiroshima Toyo Carp
- Pitcher
- Born: April 5, 1987 (age 39); Ōita, Ōita, Japan
- Bats: Right Throws: Right

debut
- May 10, 2011, for the Yomiuri Giants
- Stats at Baseball Reference

Teams
- Yomiuri Giants (2010–2013); Hiroshima Toyo Carp (2013–2017)
- Last updated on: 19 August 2015

Jumpei Ono (小野 淳平, Ono Jumpei; born April 5, 1987) is a professional Japanese baseball player. He plays pitcher for the Hiroshima Toyo Carp.
