= Tom Brice =

- Outfielder
- Born: 24 August 1981 (age 45); Woodville, South Australia, Australia
- Batted: left Threw: left

CPBL debut
- 2006, 13 June, for the Macoto Cobras

Last CPBL appearance
- 10 October, 2006, for the Macoto Cobras

CPBL statistics
- Batting average: .284
- Home runs: 5
- Runs batted in: 29
- Stats at Baseball Reference

Teams
- Macoto Cobras (2006)
Medals
Men's baseball
Representing Australia
Olympics
Silver medal – second place	Athens 2004	Team competition

Thomas Robert Brice (born 24 August 1981) in Woodville, South Australia is an Australian baseballer.

== Career ==
A left-handed power hitter, he was drafted to the Chicago White Sox in the 2002 Major League Baseball draft in the 24th round after being named as the 2002 Alabama Junior College Player of the Year.

In 2004, he was part of the Australian Olympic baseball team, who achieved a silver medal in the baseball tournament at the Athens Olympics. In the Gold Medal Game, down 2–0 in the 4th with two on and two out, Brice hit a long fly to center against Norge Vera that was caught by CF Carlos Tabares at the wall in a controversial play that got Jon Deeble ejected for arguing the call. He finished 0 for 3 with a walk in the 6–2 defeat as Australia won Silver.

He played right field for the Australian national team during the 2006 and 2009 World Baseball Classic. He has also played for South Australia in the Claxton Shield. and has played in Japan, Taiwan and Sweden.
