= Joshua Roberts =

Australian baseball & rugby league player

Melbourne Aces – No. 27
- Outfield
- Born: 17 July 1986 (age 40); Ipswich, Australia
- Bats: Left Throws: Right
- Stats at Baseball Reference

Joshua Roberts (born 17 July 1986) is a baseball and rugby league player for the Melbourne Aces in the Australian Baseball League and Ipswich Jets in the Queensland Rugby League. Josh was signed to the Cleveland Indians in 2003 and played in their organisation from 2004–2006 reaching A ball with the Lake County Captains playing catcher, first base, outfield and even pitcher.

After being released, Josh played at home in the Claxton Shield with the Queensland Rams as well as in the Ipswich Rugby League. On 11 November 2010 he debuted in right field for the Brisbane Bandits in their first game of the Australian Baseball League. He hit the first ever home-run for the Bandits on 26 November 2010 against the Sydney Blue Sox and by the end of the season he had hit at a .319/.400/.548 clip, earning MVP honours for the Bandits after leading the club in hits, walks, doubles and home-runs.

After a successful 2010–11 Australian Baseball League season for Roberts, he was invited to and unsuccessfully trialled with the Fukuoka SoftBank Hawks of the NPB.

Roberts debuted for the Ipswich Jets in 2011, but has recommitted himself to the Brisbane Bandits and baseball as his priority over rugby league.
