= Itaru Hashimoto =

Japanese baseball player

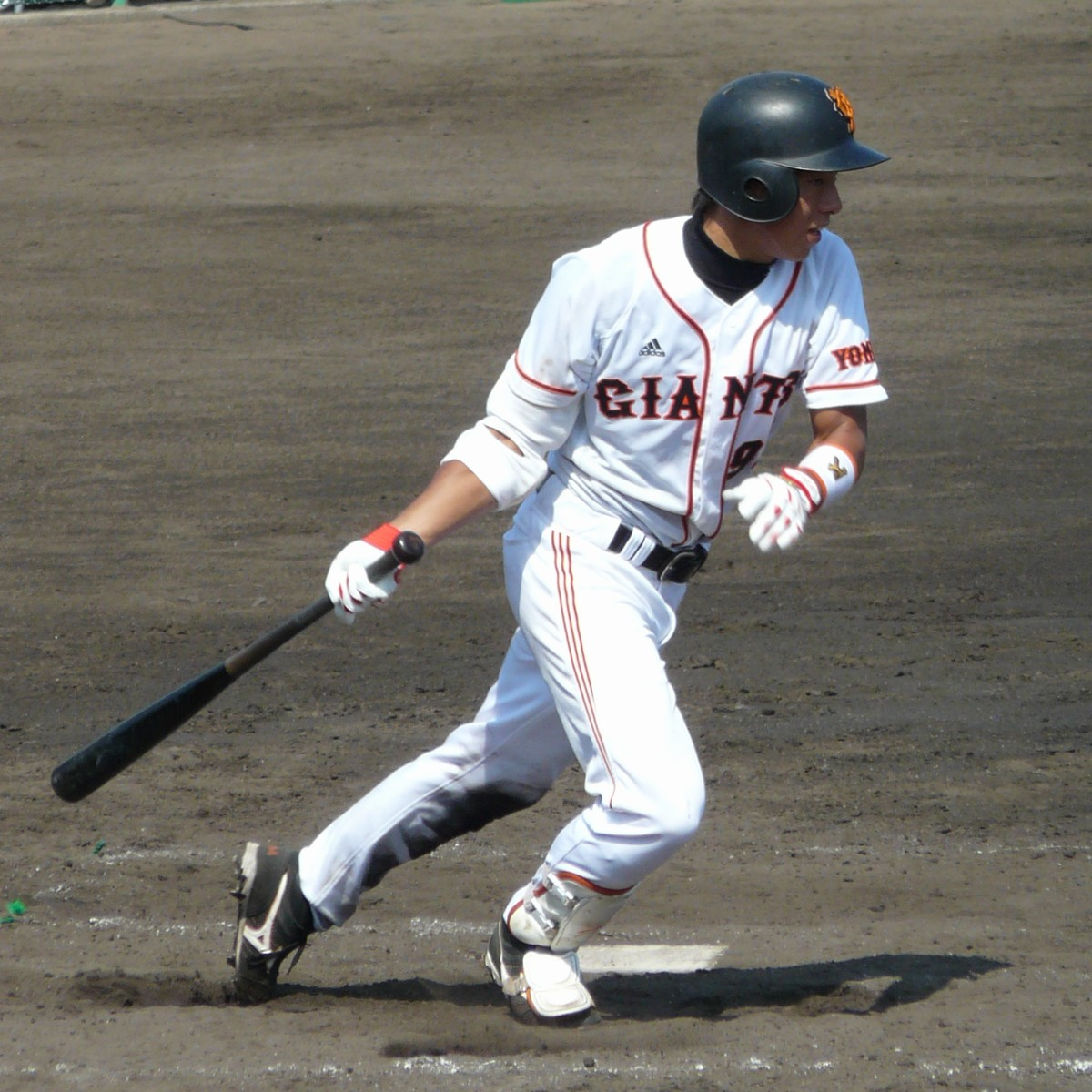
- Hashimoto with the Yomiuri Giants

Yomiuri Giants – No. 87
- Outfielder / Coach
- Born: April 28, 1990 (age 36)
- Batted: Left Threw: Right

NPB debut
- April 27, 2010, for the Yomiuri Giants

Last NPB appearance
- May 18, 2019, for the Tohoku Rakuten Golden Eagles

NPB statistics (through 2018)
- Batting average: .243
- Home runs: 9
- Runs batted in: 79
- Stats at Baseball Reference

Teams
- As player: Yomiuri Giants (2010–2011, 2013–2018); Tohoku Rakuten Golden Eagles (2019); As coach: Yomiuri Giants (2023–)

Itaru Hashimoto (橋本 到; born April 28, 1990) is a Japanese former professional baseball outfielder in Japan's Nippon Professional Baseball. He played with the Yomiuri Giants from 2009 to 2018 and for the Tohoku Rakuten Golden Eagles in 2019.
