= Robbie Widlansky =

American baseball player (born 1984)

Florida Atlantic Owls
- Assistant coach
- Born: November 6, 1984 (age 41); Plantation, Florida, U.S.
- Bats: Left Throws: Right
- Stats at Baseball Reference

Robert Eric Widlansky (born November 6, 1984) is an American former professional baseball outfielder who played internationally for the Israel national baseball team.

In college, he won the Sun Belt Conference batting title his senior season, with a Florida Atlantic University (FAU) school-record .430 average. Widlansky was named the Sun Belt Player of the Year, and an NCAA All-American.

Widlansky was drafted by the Baltimore Orioles in the 11th round of the 2007 MLB first-year player draft. With the Aberdeen IronBirds of the New York–Penn League, he broke the team record for most RBIs in a single month in July 2008, and was chosen to play in the 2008 New York–Penn League All-Star Game. In 2009 at Class A Advanced Frederick Keys he was named the Carolina League's Offensive Player of the Week three times, and the Player of the Month for August. Widlansky won the Carolina League batting title with a .340 batting average, and was named the Orioles' 27th-top prospect.

In 2010–11, he played in the Australian Baseball League for the Perth Heat. In June 2012, he was voted Topps Eastern League Player of the Month while playing for the Bowie Baysox, in July he was an Eastern League Mid-Season All Star, and later that year he was named an MiLB.com Organization All-Star. In September 2012, Widlansky played on Team Israel in the qualifying round to the World Baseball Classic.

Widlansky has played Triple A ball for the Orioles and the Los Angeles Angels of Anaheim. Through 2013, in his minor league career he had a .283 batting average with 271 runs, 141 doubles, 46 home runs, and 334 RBIs in 615 games. Widlansky served as an Assistant Baseball Coach at Florida Atlantic University for the 2014 – June 2015 season.

== Personal life ==
Widlansky is the son of Richard and Brina Widlansky, and was born in Plantation, Florida. He has two brothers, Josh and Ari.

== Baseball career ==
=== High school ===
Widlansky played high school baseball at J. P. Taravella High School in Coral Springs, Florida. He was honored both his junior and senior seasons as the "Broward County Coaches 6A Player of the Year." He also was named All-County (Broward) and All-State (Florida) twice in his high school career. He set school records for doubles in a season, career doubles, and career batting average.

After graduating, he was drafted by the New York Yankees in the 2003 MLB First-Year Player Draft (34th round), but declined as he instead chose to attend Florida Atlantic University.

=== College ===
At FAU, Widlansky saw playing time immediately as a freshman at third base, and ended up playing in 48 games for the season. Highlights of his collegiate career include: an Atlantic Sun Conference Championship his freshman year, started all 60 of FAU's games his sophomore year, a Sun Belt Conference batting title his senior season (.430 average; breaking the school's season record), and Sun Belt Player of the Year, NCAA All-American honors, and First-Team All-Conference honors his senior season. In 2005, he played collegiate summer baseball with the Bourne Braves of the Cape Cod Baseball League. He switched from third base to the outfield in 2007. In 2007, he also hit 15 home runs and had 69 RBIs. In his four seasons at FAU (2004–07), he batted .351 in 172 games with 27 home runs and 134 RBIs.

=== Minor leagues and Australian Baseball League ===
Widlansky was drafted in the 11th round (339 overall) in the 2007 MLB draft by the Baltimore Orioles. He was assigned to the Aberdeen IronBirds of the New York–Penn League as a left fielder. While playing for the Ironbirds, Widlansky broke the team record for most RBIs in a single month in July 2008. Widlansky was chosen by fans to be on the American League roster of the 2008 New York–Penn League All-Star Game. On August 20, 2008, he was promoted to Class-A Delmarva Shorebirds, for whom he played 12 games.

On May 19, 2009, he was promoted to the Class A Advanced Frederick Keys. Widlanksy averaged .431 in the first half of the season and was named the Carolina League's Offensive Player of the Week three times, as well as the Player of the Month for August. Manager Richie Hebner said: "Everything he hits is right on the button. Even his outs are hit hard." Widlansky finished with a .340 batting average to win the Carolina League batting title. He was named the 27th-top prospect for the Baltimore Orioles.

In 2010, Widlansky was promoted to the Class AA Bowie Baysox. He did not play a complete season due to a fractured left ankle.

During the winter of 2010–11, Widlansky traveled to Perth, Australia to compete in the Australian Baseball League (ABL). He had a productive season playing for the Perth Heat. He averaged .325 with 4 home runs, 30 runs, and 22 runs batted in and helped the Heat to win their first ABL Championship. He came back to the United States and played half a season for the Bowie Baysox.

In 2012, he again played for the Bowie Baysox. On June 30, 2012, he was voted Topps Eastern League Player of the Month, and in July he was an Eastern League Mid-Season All Star. During the All Star break, Widlansky was promoted to the Class AAA Norfolk Tides.

In 2012 with the Bowie Baysox, he batted .316 (second among all Orioles minor leaguers, and third in the Eastern League)/.404/.446 with 83 RBIs (leading all Orioles minor leaguers), 8 home runs, 71 runs, and 11 stolen bases. He was also among the league leaders in the Eastern League in doubles (35, 2nd), on-base percentage (.404, 2nd), walks (64, 4th) and hits (148, 5th). He helped the team reach the playoffs with the best hitting of his career.

In December 2012, he was named an MiLB.com Organization All-Star. He was also named The Jewish Baseball News Most Valuable Player among Jewish minor leaguers for 2012. That month, Widlansky was drafted by the Angels in the AAA Phase of the Rule 5 draft, after six seasons in the Baltimore Orioles organization.

In 2013, he played for Triple A Salt Lake and hit .367 in 16 games, and in Double-A he batted .261 with 8 home runs and 46 RBIs in 88 games.

In 2014, he was signed by the Somerset Patriots of the Atlantic League of Professional Baseball. Somerset manager Brett Jodie said: "Robbie does a lot of things well. He is that hard nose type of player that you need on your team. He has some power, he is a tough out, he can run a little and play a few different positions." He was released in June 2014 after hitting .214 in 33 games played.

=== World Baseball Classic ===
In September 2012, Widlansky played on Team Israel in the qualifying round to the World Baseball Classic. Widlansky did not appear in the first, or second games of the tournament. During the third and final game of the qualifier, Widlansky entered the game as a pinch hitter for Cody Decker and was intentionally walked, and stayed in the game in left field, and again walked during his second at bat.
