= Andrew Brassington =

English cricketer

Personal information
- Full name: Andrew James Brassington
- Born: 9 August 1954 (age 72); Bagnall, Staffordshire, England
- Batting: Right-handed
- Role: Wicket-keeper

Domestic team information
- Years: Team
- 1974–1978: Gloucestershire

Career statistics
Competition	First-class	List A
Matches	128	57
Runs scored	882	142
Batting average	8.01	9.46
100s/50s	–/–	–/–
Top score	35	20
Balls bowled	6	0
Wickets	0	–
Bowling average	–	–
5 wickets in innings	–	–
10 wickets in match	–	–
Best bowling	–	–
Catches/stumpings	128/47	45/11
- Source: Cricinfo, 11 July 2022

Andrew James Brassington (born 9 August 1954, at Bagnall, Staffordshire) is a former cricketer who played first-class cricket over 15 seasons for Gloucestershire from 1974 to 1988.

A lower-order right-handed batsman and a wicketkeeper, Brassington was a regular in the Gloucestershire first-class side between 1978 and 1982, but played less frequently in one-day matches because Andy Stovold was a far better batsman and an adequate wicketkeeper. He played seldom after 1982 because of the emergence of Jack Russell as a wicketkeeper-batsman.
