= Andrew Russell (baseball) =

Australian baseball player

Free Agent
- Pitcher
- Born: 27 April 1984 (age 41); Melbourne, Australia
- Bats: Left Throws: Right
- Stats at Baseball Reference

Andrew Todd Russell (born 27 April 1984, in Melbourne) is an Australian former professional baseball pitcher. He played for Team Australia in the 2013 World Baseball Classic.
