= Josh Davies =

Australian professional baseball player

- Infielder
- Born: 12 September 1985 (age 41); Bendigo, Victoria, Australia
- Bats: Right Throws: Right
- Stats at Baseball Reference

Joshua Marc Davies (born 12 September 1985) is an Australian professional baseball player.

== Career ==
Davies attended Bendigo Senior Secondary College. He signed with the Anaheim Angels as an international free agent in 2003. The Angels released Davies in 2007, and he signed with the San Diego Padres organisation a week later. He competed for the Australian national baseball team in the 2013 World Baseball Classic.
