= Phil Brassington =

Australian right-handed pitcher

- Pitcher
- Born: 19 April 1970 (age 55); Canberra, Australia
- Bats: right Throws: right
- Stats at Baseball Reference

Phillip Brassington (born 19 April 1970 in Canberra, Australia) is an Australian right-handed pitcher.

== Career ==
After a year of college baseball with the Lamar University Cardinals, Brassington was drafted by Kansas City Royals in 5th Round (133rd overall) of 1993 amateur entry draft and played the 1993 season with the Eugene Emeralds as a starting pitcher where he finished with a season ERA of 2.42.

For ten years, Brassingtons professional career was plagued by elbow, shoulder and rotator cuff injuries, but still managed to make the 1999 and 2000 US Northern League All-Star teams and play in the Australian Baseball League on and off throughout its existence. He also debuted for the Australian national baseball team in 1996. Brassington played his last full season of professional baseball until 2003 with Allentown in the independent Northeast League.

After Brassington tore his labrum in half, he was told his pitching career may be over. However, instead of giving away his career, Brassington worked on his knuckleball to keep him in the sport and after tinkering with it in a year of local club ball with Tuggeranong Vikings in Canberra, Brassington was selected for the 2006 World Baseball Classic and pitched against Venezuela.

Brassington wasn't selected for the 2009 World Baseball Classic, however he played for Australia Provincial in Claxton Shield 2008 and South Australia in Claxton Shield 2009.

Brassington played for the Canberra Cavalry in the 2011–12 ABL season and plays locally for the Tuggeranong Vikings in Canberra.

Brassington made one appearance in the 2012–2013 ABL season for the Perth Heat as an emergency call up against his local Cavalry.
