= Norihito Kaneto =

Japanese baseball player

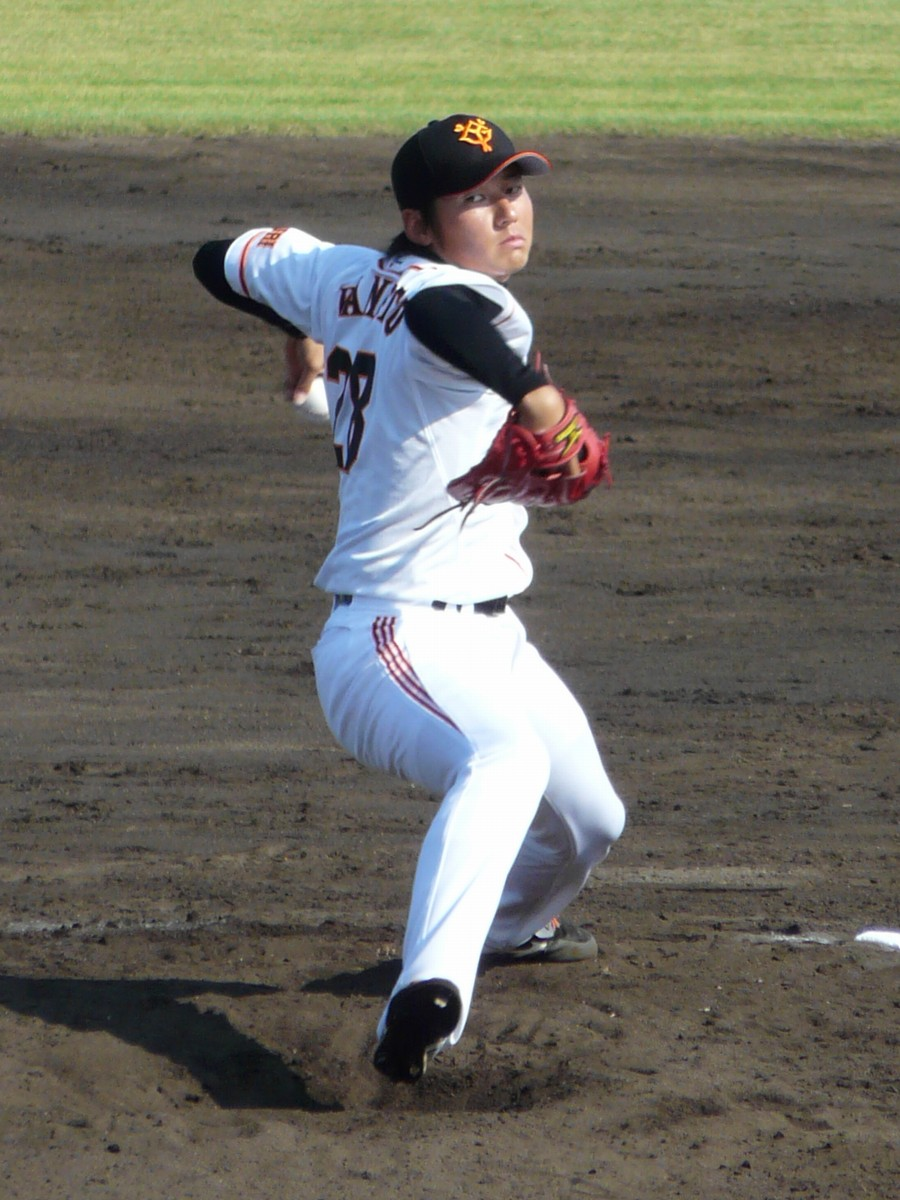
- Kaneto with the Yomiuri Giants
- Relief pitcher
- Born: April 10, 1984 (age 41); Amagasaki, Hyōgo
- Bats: Left Throws: Left

NPB debut
- April 4, 2007, for the Yomiuri Giants

NPB statistics (through 2016)
- Win–loss: 17–16
- ERA: 3.84
- Strikeouts: 212

Teams
- Yomiuri Giants (2007–2012); Tohoku Rakuten Golden Eagles (2013–2017)

Career highlights and awards
- 2× Japan Series champion (2009, 2013)
- Last updated on: January 20, 2018

Norihito Kaneto (金刃 憲人, Kaneto Norihito; born April 10, 1984 in Amagasaki, Hyōgo) is a Nippon Professional Baseball player for the Tohoku Rakuten Golden Eagles in Japan's Pacific League.
