= Jon Deeble =

Melbourne Aces
- Pitcher / Coach
- Born: 18 May 1962 (age 64); Melbourne, Australia
- Stats at Baseball Reference

Member of the Australian

Baseball Hall of Fame
- Induction: 2006

Jon Deeble (born 18 May 1962 in Melbourne) is the head coach of the Melbourne Aces of the Australian Baseball League and the former manager of the Australian national baseball team.

== Career ==
Deeble was a pitcher on the national team he now coaches from 1983 to 1995, a playing career which included the 1988 Olympics and an Australian Baseball League championship with the Melbourne Monarchs in 1993. He later went on to be a minor league manager in North American professional baseball, working in the Florida Marlins and Boston Red Sox organizations. After spending 15 seasons (2002–16) as coordinator of scouting for the Pacific Rim region for the Red Sox, Deeble joined the Los Angeles Dodgers' organization in October 2016.

Deeble managed the Australian squad at the 2000 and 2004 Olympics, leading the team to a silver medal in the latter Games. Deeble was Australia's manager, as well, in the 2006 World Baseball Classic and 2009 World Baseball Classic.

With the Red Sox organization, he was manager of the Lowell Spinners in 2003 – earlier, he had spent four seasons (1997–1999; 2001) as manager of the Rookie-level Gulf Coast Marlins – and was a coach for the Boston Red Sox during the 2005 season. As a scout, Deeble has signed countless young Australian hopefuls through the Australian Major League Baseball Academy, however, in Asia, he has signed such names as Daisuke Matsuzaka and Hideki Okajima.

Preceded by Mike Boulanger	Lowell Spinners manager 2003	Succeeded by Lynn Jones
