= 2011–12 Canberra Cavalry season =

2011–12 Canberra Cavalry
- League: Australian Baseball League
- Ballpark: Narrabundah Ballpark
- City: Canberra, Australian Capital Territory
- Record: 20–25 (.444)
- Place: 6th
- Owner: ABL
- General manager: Peter Bishell
- Manager: Steve Schrenk

The 2011–12 Canberra Cavalry season will be the second season for the team. As was the case for the previous season, the Cavalry will compete in the Australian Baseball League (ABL) with the other five foundation teams, and will again play its home games at Narrabundah Ballpark.

== Regular season ==
=== Standings ===
Pos	Team	Pld	W	L	PCT	GB	Qualification
1	Perth Heat	45	34	11	.756	—	Advance to major semi final
2	Melbourne Aces	45	21	24	.467	13	Advance to major semi final
3	Adelaide Bite	45	20	25	.444 (Note: 1st tiebreaker: 16–11 (.593))	14	Advance to minor semi final
4	Sydney Blue Sox	45	20	25	.444 (Note: 1st tiebreaker: 13–14 (.481); 2nd tiebreaker: 5–4 (.556))	14	Advance to minor semi final
5	Brisbane Bandits	45	20	25	.444 (Note: 1st tiebreaker: 13–14 (.481); 2nd tiebreaker: 4–5 (.444))	14	
**6**	Canberra Cavalry	**45**	**20**	**25**	.444 (Note: 1st tiebreaker: 12–15 (.444))	**14**	

Rules for classification: Teams are ranked on winning percentage. In a multi-way tie, the winning percentage from games in head-to-head competition with the other tied teams is used as the first tiebreaker. In a multi-way tie, where after the first tiebreaker two teams are still tied, the winning percentage from games in head-to-head competition between the two tied teams is used as the second tiebreaker.

==== Record vs opponents ====
Opponent	W–L Record	Largest Victory			Largest Defeat			Current Streak
Opponent	W–L Record	Score	Date	Ground	Score	Date	Ground	Current Streak
Adelaide Bite	2–2	10–2	10 Nov 2011	Coopers Stadium	10–7	11 Nov 2011	Coopers Stadium	W1
Brisbane Bandits	2–2	6–0	4 Nov 2011	Narrabundah Ballpark	7–4	5 Nov 2011	Narrabundah Ballpark	L1
Melbourne Aces	–	–			–			
Perth Heat	–	–			–			
Sydney Blue Sox	–	–			–			
Total	4–4	Against Adelaide Bite			Against Brisbane & Adelaide			W1
Total	4–4	10–2	10 Nov 2011	Coopers Stadium	7–4 10–7	5 Nov 2011 11 Nov 2011	Narrabundah Ballpark Coopers Stadium	W1

=== Game log ===
W	Cavalry win
L	Cavalry loss
T	Cavalry tie
	Game postponed
**Bold**	Cavalry team member

2011–12 Game Log
November

#	Date	Opponent	Score	Win	Loss	Save	Crowd	Record	Ref
1	4 November	Bandits	W 6–0	**Mike McGuire** (1–0)	Simon Morriss (0–1)		1,685	1–0	
2	5 November (DH 1)	Bandits	L 7–4	Alex Maestri (1–0)	**Nathan Crawford** (0–1)	John Veitch (1)	—	1–1	
3	5 November (DH 2)	Bandits	W 5–4	**Steven Kent** (1–0)	Chris Mowday (0–1)		1,224	2–1	
4	6 November	Bandits	L 9–6	John Veitch (1–0)	**Brian Grening** (0–1)	Chris Mowday (1)	987	2–2	
5	10 November	@ Bite	W 10–2	**Brian Grening** (1–1)	Dushan Ruzic (0–2)		876	3–2	
6	11 November	@ Bite	L 10–7	Darren Fidge (1–0)	**Hayden Beard** (0–1)	Ryan Beckman (1)	1,110	3–3	
7	12 November	@ Bite	L 3–2	Paul Mildren (1–0)	**Tristan Crawford** (0–1)	Wayne Ough (1)	1,360	3–4	
8	13 November	@ Bite	W 9–5	**Steven Kent** (2–0)	Jandy Sena (0–1)	**Mike McGuire** (1)	706	4–4	
9	24 November	Aces	–						
10	25 November	Aces	–						
11	26 November	Aces	–						
12	27 November	Aces	–						

December

#	Date	Opponent	Score	Win	Loss	Save	Crowd	Record	Ref
13	2 December	@ Heat	–						
14	3 December	@ Heat	–						
15	4 December	@ Heat	–						
16	5 December	@ Heat	–						
17	8 December	Bite	–						
18	9 December (DH 1)	Bite	–						
19	9 December (DH 2)	Bite	–						
20	10 December	Bite	–						
21	11 December	Bite	–						
22	15 December	@ Blue Sox	–						
23	16 December	@ Blue Sox	–						
24	17 December	@ Blue Sox	–						
25	18 December	@ Blue Sox	–						
26	29 December	@ Bandits	–						
27	30 December	@ Bandits	–						
28	31 December (DH 1)	@ Bandits	–						
29	31 December (DH 2)	@ Bandits	–						

January

#	Date	Opponent	Score	Win	Loss	Save	Crowd	Record	Ref
30	1 January	@ Bandits	–						
31	5 January	Blue Sox	–						
32	6 January	Blue Sox	–						
33	7 January (DH 1)	Blue Sox	–						
34	7 January (DH 2)	Blue Sox	–						
35	8 January	Blue Sox	–						
36	12 January	Heat	–						
37	13 January	Heat	–						
38	14 January (DH 1)	Heat	–						
39	14 January (DH 2)	Heat	–						
40	15 January	Heat	–						
41	18 January	@ Aces	–						
42	19 January	@ Aces	–						
43	20 January	@ Aces	–						
44	21 January (DH 1)	@ Aces	–						
45	21 January (DH 2)	@ Aces	–						

== Roster ==
Canberra Cavalry roster – 2011–12 ABL
Active roster		Inactive roster	Coaching staff
Pitchers Right-handed pitchers: 17 (Australia) Hayden Beard; 10 (Australia) Jarrett Commane; 30 (Australia) Nathan Crawford; 31 (Australia) Tristan Crawford; 41 (Australia) Brian Grening; 4 (Japan) Daiki Kiyohara; 40 (United States) Mike McGuire; Left-handed pitchers: 23 (Australia) Steven Kent; 20 (Australia) Michael Laird; 21 (Australia) Chris Morgan; 8 (Australia) Alex Rogers	Catchers: 11 (Australia) Kyle Perkins; 16 (Australia) Travis Scott; Infielders: 5 (Australia) Kody Hightower; 6 (Australia) Kellen Kmiecik; 37 (Japan) Masashi Nohara; 24 (United States) John Tolisano; Outfielders: 7 (United States) Brian Burgamy; 14 (United States) Todd Glaesmann; 13 (Japan) Yuhei Kai; 25 (United States) Ty Morrison; 3 (United States) Kenny Wilson	Pitchers: -- (Japan) Takumi Akiyama; -- (Australia) Tim Atherton; -- (Australia) Matthew Fawcett; -- (Australia) Mark Trau; -- (Australia) Luke Wilkins; Catchers: -- (Australia) Robbie Perkins; -- (United States) Mark Thomas; Infielders: -- (Australia) Byron Aird; -- (Japan) Fumiya Araki; -- (Puerto Rico) Carlos Diaz; Outfielders: -- (United States) Kevin Kiermaier	Manager: 27 (United States) Steve Schrenk; Coaches: 9 (Australia) Mike Johns (Coach); 29 (Australia) Keith Ward (Coach); 26 (Australia) Michael Wells (Coach)
Correct as of 8 November 2011.
