= 2011–12 Brisbane Bandits season =

2011–12 Brisbane Bandits
- League: Australian Baseball League
- Ballpark: Brisbane Exhibition Ground
- City: Brisbane, Queensland
- Record: 20–25 (.444)
- Place: 5th
- Owner: ABL
- General manager: Paul Gonzalez
- Manager: Kevin Jordan
- Television: In-House Broadcast

The 2011–12 Brisbane Bandits season was the second season for the team. As was the case for the previous season, the Bandits will compete in the Australian Baseball League (ABL) with the other five foundation teams, and will again play its home games at the Brisbane Exhibition Ground.

== Offseason ==
In October 2011, Bandits manager David Nilsson stood down from his role, with Kevin Jordan named manager for the 2011–12 season.

== Regular season ==
=== Standings ===
Pos	Team	Pld	W	L	PCT	GB	Qualification
1	Perth Heat	45	34	11	.756	—	Advance to major semi final
2	Melbourne Aces	45	21	24	.467	13	Advance to major semi final
3	Adelaide Bite	45	20	25	.444 (Note: 1st tiebreaker: 16–11 (.593))	14	Advance to minor semi final
4	Sydney Blue Sox	45	20	25	.444 (Note: 1st tiebreaker: 13–14 (.481); 2nd tiebreaker: 5–4 (.556))	14	Advance to minor semi final
**5**	Brisbane Bandits	**45**	**20**	**25**	.444 (Note: 1st tiebreaker: 13–14 (.481); 2nd tiebreaker: 4–5 (.444))	**14**	
6	Canberra Cavalry	45	20	25	.444 (Note: 1st tiebreaker: 12–15 (.444))	14	

Rules for classification: Teams are ranked on winning percentage. In a multi-way tie, the winning percentage from games in head-to-head competition with the other tied teams is used as the first tiebreaker. In a multi-way tie, where after the first tiebreaker two teams are still tied, the winning percentage from games in head-to-head competition between the two tied teams is used as the second tiebreaker.

==== Record vs opponents ====
Opponent	W–L Record	Largest Victory			Largest Defeat			Current Streak
Opponent	W–L Record	Score	Date	Ground	Score	Date	Ground	Current Streak
Adelaide Bite	–	–			–			
Canberra Cavalry	2–2	7–4	5 Nov 2011	Narrabundah Ballpark	6–0	4 Nov 2011	Narrabundah Ballpark	W1
Melbourne Aces	–	–			–			
Perth Heat	–	–			–			
Sydney Blue Sox	3–1	10–0 (F/7)	11 Nov 2011	Brisbane Exhibition Ground	6–4	10 Nov 2011	Brisbane Exhibition Ground	W3
Total	5–3	Against Sydney Blue Sox			Against Canberra Cavalry			W3
Total	5–3	10–0 (F/7)	11 Nov 2011	Brisbane Exhibition Ground	6–0	4 Nov 2011	Narrabundah Ballpark	W3

=== Game log ===
W	Bandits win
L	Bandits loss
T	Bandits tie
	Game postponed
**Bold**	Bandits team member

2011–12 Game Log
November

#	Date	Opponent	Score	Win	Loss	Save	Crowd	Record	Ref
1	4 November	@ Cavalry	L 6–0	Mike McGuire (1–0)	**Simon Morriss** (0–1)		1,685	0–1	
2	5 November (DH 1)	@ Cavalry	W 7–4	**Alex Maestri** (1–0)	Nathan Crawford (0–1)	**John Veitch** (1)	—	1–1	
3	5 November (DH 2)	@ Cavalry	L 5–4	Steven Kent (1–0)	**Chris Mowday** (0–1)		1,224	1–2	
4	6 November	@ Cavalry	W 9–6	**John Veitch** (1–0)	Brian Grening (0–1)	**Chris Mowday** (1)	987	2–2	
5	10 November	Blue Sox	L 6–4	Craig Anderson (1–0)	**Simon Morriss** (0–2)	Koo Dae-Sung (2)	803	2–3	
6	11 November	Blue Sox	W 10–0 (F/7)	**Alex Maestri** (2–0)	Wayne Lundgren (0–1)		1,030	3–3	
7	12 November	Blue Sox	W 2–0	**Yohei Yanagawa** (1–0)	Aiden Francis (0–1)	**Chris Mowday** (2)	1,353	4–3	
8	13 November	Blue Sox	W 2–1	**Chris Mowday** (1–1)	Chris Oxspring (2–1)		640	5–3	
9	17 November	@ Aces	–						
10	18 November	@ Aces	–						
11	19 November	@ Aces	–						
12	20 November	@ Aces	–						

December

#	Date	Opponent	Score	Win	Loss	Save	Crowd	Record	Ref
13	1 December	@ Blue Sox	–						
14	2 December (DH 1)	@ Blue Sox	–						
15	2 December (DH 2)	@ Blue Sox	–						
16	3 December	@ Blue Sox	–						
17	4 December	@ Blue Sox	–						
18	8 December	Heat	–						
19	9 December	Heat	–						
20	10 December (DH 1)	Heat	–						
21	10 December (DH 2)	Heat	–						
22	15 December	Bite	–						
23	16 December	Bite	–						
24	17 December	Bite	–						
25	18 December	Bite	–						
26	29 December	Cavalry	–						
27	30 December	Cavalry	–						
28	31 December (DH 1)	Cavalry	–						
29	31 December (DH 2)	Cavalry	–						

January

#	Date	Opponent	Score	Win	Loss	Save	Crowd	Record	Ref
30	1 January	Cavalry	–						
31	4 January	@ Heat	–						
32	5 January	@ Heat	–						
33	6 January	@ Heat	–						
34	7 January	@ Heat	–						
35	8 January	@ Heat	–						
36	11 January	Aces	–						
37	12 January	Aces	–						
38	13 January	Aces	–						
39	14 January	Aces	–						
40	15 January	Aces	–						
41	19 January	@ Bite	–						
42	20 January	@ Bite	–						
43	21 January (DH 1)	@ Bite	–						
44	21 January (DH 2)	@ Bite	–						
45	22 January	@ Bite	–						

== Roster ==
Brisbane Bandits roster – 2011–12 ABL
Active roster		Inactive Roster	Coaching Staff
Pitchers Right-handed pitchers: 15 (Australia) Steven Chambers; 16 (South Africa) Justin Erasmus; 36 (United States) Sean Jarrett; 27 (Italy) Alex Maestri; 28 (New Zealand) Andrew Marck; 24 (Australia) Simon Morriss; 34 (Australia) Chris Mowday; 32 (Australia) John Veitch; 23 (Japan) Yohei Yanagawa; Left-handed pitchers: 6 (Australia) Trent Baker; 5 (United States) Jon Durket; 7 (Australia) Chris Lamb	Catchers: 25 (Australia) Joel Naughton; 18 (Australia) Mitchell Nilsson; 2 (Japan) Ayatsugu Yamashita; Infielders: 17 (Australia) Andrew Campbell; 21 (Australia) Brad Dutton; 10 (Australia) Wade Dutton; 1 (Japan) Taisei Makihara; 33 (Australia) Rory Rhodes; 43 (Australia) David Sutherland; Outfielders: 9 (Japan) Keiji Nakahara; 19 (Australia) Joshua Roberts; 20 (Australia) Matt Roxburgh	Pitchers: 35 (Australia) Jason Kilby; -- (Australia) Tristan Loetzsch; 12 (Australia) Rhys Niit; 22 (Australia) Ryan Searle; 31 (Australia) Aaron Thompson; 26 (Australia) Josh Warner; Catchers: 29 (Australia) Ryan Battaglia; -- (Australia) Kieran Bradford; Infielders: -- (Japan) Kenta Imamiya; 31 (New Zealand) Daniel Lamb-Hunt; 20 (Australia) Jay Nilsson; 8 (Australia) Alan Schoenberger; Outfielders: -- (Australia) Aven Fletcher	Manager: 11 (Australia) Kevin Jordan; Coaches: 37 (Australia) Gary Nilsson (Pitching Coach); 13 (Australia) Shayne Watson (Coach)
Current as of 30 November 2011.
