= 2011–12 Perth Heat season =

2011–12 Perth Heat
- Claxton Shield champions
- Minor premiership
- League: Australian Baseball League
- Ballpark: Barbagallo Ballpark
- City: Perth, Western Australia
- Record: 34–11 (.756)
- Place: 1st
- Owner: ABL
- General manager: Alex Pellerano
- Manager: Brooke Knight
- Radio: 91.3 SportFM

The 2011–12 Perth Heat season will be the second season for the team. As was the case for the previous season, the Heat will compete in the Australian Baseball League (ABL) with the other five foundation teams, and will again play its home games at Barbagallo Ballpark.

The Heat will also be defending the ABL Championship title, having won the previous season's Championship Series, and over the course of the season, will represent Australia in the 2011 Asia Series.

== Offseason ==
Following the Heat's inaugural ABL Championship victory, the League announced that, beginning in 2011, the winner of each ABL Championship Series would participate in that year's Asia Series, a round-robin tournament of champion teams from the baseball leagues of Asia, including representatives of Japan, Republic of Korea, Republic of China and, going forward, People's Republic of China. As winners of the 2011 ABL Championship Series, the Heat will be the first Australian team to enter into this competition.

== Regular season ==
=== Standings ===
Pos	Team	Pld	W	L	PCT	GB	Qualification
**1**	Perth Heat	**45**	**34**	**11**	.756	—	**Advance to major semi final**
2	Melbourne Aces	45	21	24	.467	13	**Advance to major semi final**
3	Adelaide Bite	45	20	25	.444 (Note: 1st tiebreaker: 16–11 (.593))	14	Advance to minor semi final
4	Sydney Blue Sox	45	20	25	.444 (Note: 1st tiebreaker: 13–14 (.481); 2nd tiebreaker: 5–4 (.556))	14	Advance to minor semi final
5	Brisbane Bandits	45	20	25	.444 (Note: 1st tiebreaker: 13–14 (.481); 2nd tiebreaker: 4–5 (.444))	14	
6	Canberra Cavalry	45	20	25	.444 (Note: 1st tiebreaker: 12–15 (.444))	14	

Rules for classification: Teams are ranked on winning percentage. In a multi-way tie, the winning percentage from games in head-to-head competition with the other tied teams is used as the first tiebreaker. In a multi-way tie, where after the first tiebreaker two teams are still tied, the winning percentage from games in head-to-head competition between the two tied teams is used as the second tiebreaker.

==== Record vs opponents ====
Opponent	W–L Record	Largest Victory			Largest Defeat			Current Streak
Opponent	W–L Record	Score	Date	Ground	Score	Date	Ground	Current Streak
Adelaide Bite	3–0	6–1	4 Nov 2011	Baseball Park	–			W3
Brisbane Bandits	–	–			–			
Canberra Cavalry	–	–			–			
Melbourne Aces	4–0	6–1	13 Nov 2011	Melbourne Showgrounds	–			W4
Sydney Blue Sox	–	–			–			
Total	7–0	Against Adelaide & Melbourne			Against			W7
Total	7–0	6–1	4 Nov 2011 13 Nov 2011	Baseball Park Melbourne Showgrounds	–			W7

=== Game log ===
W	Heat win
L	Heat loss
T	Heat tie
	Game postponed
**Bold**	Heat team member

2011–12 Game Log
November

#	Date	Opponent	Score	Win	Loss	Save	Crowd	Record	Ref
—	3 November	Postponed due to rain (5 November)							
1	4 November	Bite	W 6–1	**Cameron Lamb** (1–0)	Dushan Ruzic (0–1)		958	1–0	
—	5 November	Postponed due to rain (6 November)							
—	5 November	Postponed due to rain (TBA)							
2	6 November (DH 1)	Bite	W 7–4	**Geoff Brown** (1–0)	Chris Lawson (0–1)	**Benn Grice** (1)	—	2–0	
3	6 November (DH 2)	Bite	W 3–2	**Benn Grice** (1–0)	Wayne Ough (0–1)		952	3–0	
4	11 November	@ Aces	W 6–3	**Daniel Schmidt** (1–0)	Shane Lindsay (0–1)	**Benn Grice** (2)	1,514	4–0	
5	12 November	@ Aces	W 9–8	**Trevor Caughey** (1–0)	Yusei Kikuchi (0–1)	**Matt Erickson** (1)	1,174	5–0	
6	13 November (DH 1)	@ Aces	W 6–1	**Jacob Clem** (1–0)	Jason Hirsh (0–1)		—	6–0	
7	13 November (DH 2)	@ Aces	W 5–3	**Warwick Saupold** (1–0)	Nic Ungs (0–1)		923	7–0	
8	17 November	@ Blue Sox	–						
9	18 November (DH 1)	@ Blue Sox	–						
10	18 November (DH 2)	@ Blue Sox	–						
11	19 November	@ Blue Sox	–						
**2011 Asia Series**

December

#	Date	Opponent	Score	Win	Loss	Save	Crowd	Record	Ref
12	2 December	Cavalry	–						
13	3 December	Cavalry	–						
14	4 December	Cavalry	–						
15	5 December	Cavalry	–						
16	8 December	@ Bandits	–						
17	9 December	@ Bandits	–						
18	10 December (DH 1)	@ Bandits	–						
19	10 December (DH 2)	@ Bandits	–						
20	16 December	Aces	–						
21	17 December	Aces	–						
22	18 December	Aces	–						
23	19 December	Aces	–						
24	20 December	Aces	–						
25	29 December	@ Bite	–						
26	30 December	@ Bite	–						
27	31 December (DH 1)	@ Bite	–						
28	31 December (DH 2)	@ Bite	–						

January

#	Date	Opponent	Score	Win	Loss	Save	Crowd	Record	Ref
29	1 January	@ Bite	–						
30	4 January	Bandits	–						
31	5 January	Bandits	–						
32	6 January	Bandits	–						
33	7 January	Bandits	–						
34	8 January	Bandits	–						
35	12 January	@ Cavalry	–						
36	13 January	@ Cavalry	–						
37	14 January (DH 1)	@ Cavalry	–						
38	14 January (DH 2)	@ Cavalry	–						
39	15 January	@ Cavalry	–						
40	18 January	Blue Sox	–						
41	19 January	Blue Sox	–						
42	20 January	Blue Sox	–						
43	21 January	Blue Sox	–						
44	22 January	Blue Sox	–						

== Roster ==
Perth Heat roster – 2011–12 ABL
Roster		Inactive Roster	Coaching Staff
Pitchers Right-handed pitchers: 31 (Australia) Tyler Anderson; 25 (Australia) Jacob Clem; 15 (Australia) Benn Grice; 43 (United States) Jack Frawley; 9 (Australia) Cameron Lamb; 43 (Australia) Adam Millson; 28 (Australia) Todd Murphy; 30 (Australia) Warwick Saupold; 19 (Australia) Robert Sorensen; 44 (United States) Virgil Vasquez; Left-handed pitchers: 36 (United States) Geoff Brown; 20 (United States) Trevox Fox; 26 (Australia) Daniel Schmidt	Catchers: 11 (Australia) Allan de San Miguel; 7 (Australia) Matt Kennelly; Infielders: 3 (Australia) Aaron Bonomi; 24 (United States) Mychal Givens; 2 (Australia) Mitchell Graham; 16 (Australia) Luke Hughes; Outfielders: 1 (Australia) Corey Adamson; 5 (Australia) Adam Courcha; 23 (Australia) Tim Kennelly; 6 (United States) James McOwen; 8 (Australia) Graham Scorer; 18 (United States) Brenden Webb	Pitchers: -- (Australia) Liam Baron; 40 (Australia) Travis Bass; -- (United States) Trevor Caughey; 45 (United States) Matt Erickson; -- (Australia) Liam Hendriks; -- (Australia) Roy Hotvedt; 37 (United States) Dylan Jones; -- (United States) Benjamin Moore; -- (Australia) Josh Silvi; 14 (Australia) Dean White; 21 (Australia) Brendan Wise; 22 (United States) Matt Zachary; Catchers: 4 (United States) Alex Burg; Infielders: -- (United States) Aaron Baker; 10 (Australia) Lachlan Dale; -- (Australia) Anthony Daniele; Outfielders: 34 (Australia) Brandon Dale; 33 (Australia) Elliot Hargreaves	Manager: 13 (United States) Brooke Knight; Coaches: 27 (Australia) Graeme Lloyd (Pitching Coach); 17 (United States) Steven Fish (First Base Coach); 32 (Australia) Kevin Hooker (Bench Coach)
Correct as of 15 February 2012.
