= 2011–12 Melbourne Aces season =

2011–12 Melbourne Aces
- League: Australian Baseball League
- Ballpark: Melbourne Showgrounds
- City: Melbourne, Victoria
- Record: 21–24 (.467)
- League place: 2nd
- Owner: ABL
- General manager: Windsor Knox
- Manager: Phil Dale
- Radio: Aussie Digital

The 2011–12 Melbourne Aces season was the second season for the team. As was the case for the previous season, the Aces will compete in the Australian Baseball League (ABL) with the other five foundation teams, and will again play its home games at the Melbourne Showgrounds.

== Offseason ==
During the offseason, it was announced that the Aces' home ground, the Royal Melbourne Showgrounds, would undergo major reconstruction in preparation for this season. Among others, the most notable change involved moving home plate approximately 15 feet closer to the fence, increasing the length of the field to 400 feet at centre field. The ground was previously noted for its size among ABL grounds, having accounted for over 42% of all home runs hit during the inaugural ABL season.

== Regular season ==
=== Standings ===
Pos	Team	Pld	W	L	PCT	GB	Qualification
1	Perth Heat	45	34	11	.756	—	**Advance to major semi final**
**2**	Melbourne Aces	**45**	**21**	**24**	.467	**13**	**Advance to major semi final**
3	Adelaide Bite	45	20	25	.444 (Note: 1st tiebreaker: 16–11 (.593))	14	Advance to minor semi final
4	Sydney Blue Sox	45	20	25	.444 (Note: 1st tiebreaker: 13–14 (.481); 2nd tiebreaker: 5–4 (.556))	14	Advance to minor semi final
5	Brisbane Bandits	45	20	25	.444 (Note: 1st tiebreaker: 13–14 (.481); 2nd tiebreaker: 4–5 (.444))	14	
6	Canberra Cavalry	45	20	25	.444 (Note: 1st tiebreaker: 12–15 (.444))	14	

Rules for classification: Teams are ranked on winning percentage. In a multi-way tie, the winning percentage from games in head-to-head competition with the other tied teams is used as the first tiebreaker. In a multi-way tie, where after the first tiebreaker two teams are still tied, the winning percentage from games in head-to-head competition between the two tied teams is used as the second tiebreaker.

==== Record vs opponents ====
Opponent	W–L Record	Largest Victory			Largest Defeat			Current Streak
Opponent	W–L Record	Score	Date	Ground	Score	Date	Ground	Current Streak
Adelaide Bite	–	–			–			
Brisbane Bandits	–	–			–			
Canberra Cavalry	–	–			–			
Perth Heat	0–4	–			6–1	13 Nov 2011	Melbourne Showgrounds	L4
Sydney Blue Sox	1–3	13–9	5 Nov 2011	Blue Sox Stadium	8–6	5 Nov 2011	Blue Sox Stadium	L1
Total	1–7	Against Sydney Blue Sox			Against Perth Heat			L5
Total	1–7	13–9	5 Nov 2011	Blue Sox Stadium	6–1	13 Nov 2011	Melbourne Showgrounds	L5

=== Game log ===
W	Aces win
L	Aces loss
T	Aces tie
	Game postponed
**Bold**	Aces team member

2011–12 Game Log
November

#	Date	Opponent	Score	Win	Loss	Save	Crowd	Record	Ref
1	4 November	@ Blue Sox	L 3–2	Chris Oxspring (1–0)	**Daniel McGrath** (0–1)		1,193	0–1	
2	5 November (DH 1)	@ Blue Sox	L 8–6	Matthew Williams (1–0)	**Andrew Mann** (0–1)	Koo Dae-Sung (1)	—	0–2	
3	5 November (DH 2)	@ Blue Sox	W 13–9	**Blake Cunningham** (1–0)	Josh Wells (0–1)		1,295	1–2	
4	6 November	@ Blue Sox	L 2–0	Chris Oxspring (2–0)	**Sam Gibbons** (0–1)		1,425	1–3	
5	11 November	Heat	L 6–3	Daniel Schmidt (1–0)	**Shane Lindsay** (0–1)	Benn Grice (2)	1,514	1–4	
6	12 November	Heat	L 9–8	Trevor Caughey (1–0)	**Yusei Kikuchi** (0–1)	Matt Erickson (1)	1,174	1–5	
7	13 November (DH 1)	Heat	L 6–1	Jacob Clem (1–0)	**Jason Hirsh** (0–1)		—	1–6	
8	13 November (DH 2)	Heat	L 5–3	Warwick Saupold (1–0)	**Nic Ungs** (0–1)		923	1–7	
9	17 November	Bandits	–						
10	18 November	Bandits	–						
11	19 November	Bandits	–						
12	20 November	Bandits	–						
13	24 November	@ Cavalry	–						
14	25 November	@ Cavalry	–						
15	26 November	@ Cavalry	–						
16	27 November	@ Cavalry	–						

December

#	Date	Opponent	Score	Win	Loss	Save	Crowd	Record	Ref
17	1 December	@ Bite	–						
18	2 December (DH 1)	@ Bite	–						
19	2 December (DH 2)	@ Bite	–						
20	3 December	@ Bite	–						
21	16 December	@ Heat	–						
22	17 December	@ Heat	–						
23	18 December	@ Heat	–						
24	19 December	@ Heat	–						
25	20 December	@ Heat	–						
26	29 December	Blue Sox	–						
27	30 December	Blue Sox	–						
28	31 December (DH 1)	Blue Sox	–						
29	31 December (DH 2)	Blue Sox	–						

January

#	Date	Opponent	Score	Win	Loss	Save	Crowd	Record	Ref
30	1 January	Blue Sox	–						
31	5 January	Bite	–						
32	6 January	Bite	–						
33	7 January (DH 1)	Bite	–						
34	7 January (DH 2)	Bite	–						
35	8 January	Bite	–						
36	11 January	@ Bandits	–						
37	12 January	@ Bandits	–						
38	13 January	@ Bandits	–						
39	14 January	@ Bandits	–						
40	15 January	@ Bandits	–						
41	18 January	Cavalry	–						
42	19 January	Cavalry	–						
43	20 January	Cavalry	–						
44	21 January (DH 1)	Cavalry	–						
45	21 January (DH 2)	Cavalry	–						

== Roster ==
Melbourne Aces roster – 2011–12 ABL
Active roster		Inactive roster	Coaching Staff
Pitchers Right-handed pitchers: 27 (Australia) Kyle Bedford; 9 (Australia) Blake Cunningham; 23 (Australia) Alex De Silva; 52 (Australia) John Edwards; 2 (Australia) Sam Gibbons; 5 (Japan) Fumikazu Kimura; 42 (Australia) Shane Lindsay; 32 (Australia) Andrew Mann; 28 (Australia) Kevin Reese; Left-handed pitchers: 66 (Australia) Daniel McGrath; 49 (Australia) Paul Weichard	Catchers: 15 (Australia) Mitchell Ayres; Infielders: 12 (Australia) Josh Davies; 63 (Australia) Tom Dicker; 4 (Australia) Hayden Dingle; 16 (Australia) Darryl George; 6 (Australia) Joshua Hendricks; 26 (Australia) Justin Huber; 38 (United States) Dominic Ramos; 7 (Australia) Scott Wearne; Outfielders: 21 (Australia) Nathan Aron; 33 (Australia) Elliot Biddle; 34 (Australia) Paul Rutgers	Pitchers: 22 (Australia) Adam Blackley; 18 (Australia) Matthew Blackmore; 11 (Australia) Adam Bright; -- (United States) Bubbie Buzachero; -- (Australia) Cameron Forbes; 36 (Australia) Donovan Hendricks; 30 (United States) Jeff Jamnik; -- (Japan) Yusei Kikuchi; -- (Germany) Markus Solbach; 17 (Australia) Russell Spear; -- (Australia) Josh Spence; 40 (Australia) Greg Wiltshire; Catchers: 27 (Australia) Liam Bedford; -- (United States) Kevin David; 26 (Australia) Grant Karlsen; Infielders: -- (Australia) Brad Harman; 10 (Australia) Matthew Lawman; -- (Australia) Jamie Lethborg; -- (Australia) Jamie Papanicolaou; -- (Australia) Jacob Sheldon-Collins; -- (Australia) Adam Silva; 25 (Australia) Brett Tamburrino; Outfielders: 3 (Australia) Andrew Russell	Manager: 43 (Australia) Phil Dale; Coaches: 33 (Australia) Lee Hogan (Pitching Coach); 19 (Australia) Phil Allen (Coach); 20 (Australia) Damian Shanahan (Coach)
Current as of 8 November 2011.
