= 2011–12 Sydney Blue Sox season =

2011–12 Sydney Blue Sox
- League: Australian Baseball League
- Ballpark: Blacktown International Sportspark Sydney
- City: Blacktown, New South Wales
- Record: 20–25 (.444)
- League place: 4th
- Owner: ABL
- General manager: David Balfour
- Manager: Glenn Williams
- Radio: Triple H FM

The 2011–12 Sydney Blue Sox season will be the second season for the team. As was the case for the previous season, the Blue Sox will compete in the Australian Baseball League (ABL) with the other five foundation teams, and will again play its home games at Blacktown International Sportspark Sydney. The team will be defending its record from the 2010–11 season where it had the best win–loss record during the regular season.

== Offseason ==
In July 2011, David Welch announced his retirement from professional baseball. During the Blue Sox' inaugural season, he won the league's Pitcher of the Year award, and threw the first no-hitter in the league's history during the preliminary final series against the Adelaide Bite, accounting for the team's only win during the postseason.

Also in July, an announcement was made that the name of the sporting complex the Blue Sox use for home games was changed from Blacktown Olympic Park to Blacktown International Sportspark Sydney. In other national sporting competitions, the complex serves as the training base for the Greater Western Sydney Giants team in the Australian Football League.

== Regular season ==
=== Standings ===
Pos	Team	Pld	W	L	PCT	GB	Qualification
1	Perth Heat	45	34	11	.756	—	Advance to major semi final
2	Melbourne Aces	45	21	24	.467	13	Advance to major semi final
3	Adelaide Bite	45	20	25	.444 (Note: 1st tiebreaker: 16–11 (.593))	14	**Advance to minor semi final**
**4**	Sydney Blue Sox	**45**	**20**	**25**	.444 (Note: 1st tiebreaker: 13–14 (.481); 2nd tiebreaker: 5–4 (.556))	**14**	**Advance to minor semi final**
5	Brisbane Bandits	45	20	25	.444 (Note: 1st tiebreaker: 13–14 (.481); 2nd tiebreaker: 4–5 (.444))	14	
6	Canberra Cavalry	45	20	25	.444 (Note: 1st tiebreaker: 12–15 (.444))	14	

Rules for classification: Teams are ranked on winning percentage. In a multi-way tie, the winning percentage from games in head-to-head competition with the other tied teams is used as the first tiebreaker. In a multi-way tie, where after the first tiebreaker two teams are still tied, the winning percentage from games in head-to-head competition between the two tied teams is used as the second tiebreaker.

==== Record vs opponents ====
Opponent	W–L Record	Largest Victory			Largest Defeat			Current Streak
Opponent	W–L Record	Score	Date	Ground	Score	Date	Ground	Current Streak
Adelaide Bite	–	–			–			
Brisbane Bandits	1–3	6–4	10 Nov 2011	Brisbane Exhibition Ground	10–0 (F/7)	11 Nov 2011	Brisbane Exhibition Ground	L3
Canberra Cavalry	–	–			–			
Melbourne Aces	3–1	8–6	5 Nov 2011	Blue Sox Stadium	13–9	5 Nov 2011	Blue Sox Stadium	W1
Perth Heat	–	–			–			
Total	4–4	Against Melbourne & Brisbane			Against Brisbane Bandits			L3
Total	4–4	8–6 6–4	5 Nov 2011 10 Nov 2011	Blue Sox Stadium Brisbane Exhibition Ground	10–0 (F/7)	11 Nov 2011	Brisbane Exhibition Ground	L3

=== Game log ===
W	Blue Sox win
L	Blue Sox loss
T	Blue Sox tie
	Game postponed
**Bold**	Blue Sox team member

2010–11 Game Log
November

#	Date	Opponent	Score	Win	Loss	Save	Crowd	Record	Ref
1	4 November	Aces	W 3–2	**Chris Oxspring** (1–0)	Daniel McGrath (0–1)		1,193	1–0	
2	5 November (DH 1)	Aces	W 8–6	**Matthew Williams** (1–0)	Andrew Mann (0–1)	**Koo Dae-Sung** (1)	—	2–0	
3	5 November (DH 2)	Aces	L 13–9	Blake Cunningham (1–0)	**Josh Wells** (0–1)		1,295	2–1	
4	6 November	Aces	W 2–0	**Chris Oxspring** (2–0)	Sam Gibbons (0–1)		1,425	3–1	
5	10 November	@ Bandits	W 6–4	**Craig Anderson** (1–0)	Simon Morriss (0–2)	**Koo Dae-Sung** (2)	803	4–1	
6	11 November	@ Bandits	L 10–0 (F/7)	Alex Maestri (2–0)	**Wayne Lundgren** (0–1)		1,030	4–2	
7	12 November	@ Bandits	L 2–0	Yohei Yanagawa (1–0)	**Aiden Francis** (0–1)	Chris Mowday (2)	1,353	4–3	
8	13 November	@ Bandits	L 2–1	Chris Mowday (1–1)	**Chris Oxspring** (2–1)		640	4–4	
9	17 November	Heat	–						
10	18 November (DH 1)	Heat	–						
11	18 November (DH 2)	Heat	–						
12	19 November	Heat	–						
13	24 November	@ Bite	–						
14	25 November	@ Bite	–						
15	26 November (DH 1)	@ Bite	–						
16	26 November (DH 2)	@ Bite	–						

December

#	Date	Opponent	Score	Win	Loss	Save	Crowd	Record	Ref
17	1 December	Bandits	–						
18	2 December (DH 1)	Bandits	–						
19	2 December (DH 2)	Bandits	–						
20	3 December	Bandits	–						
21	4 December	Bandits	–						
22	15 December	Cavalry	–						
23	16 December	Cavalry	–						
24	17 December	Cavalry	–						
25	18 December	Cavalry	–						
26	29 December	@ Aces	–						
27	30 December	@ Aces	–						
28	31 December (DH 1)	@ Aces	–						
29	31 December (DH 2)	@ Aces	–						

January

#	Date	Opponent	Score	Win	Loss	Save	Crowd	Record	Ref
30	1 January	@ Aces	–						
31	5 January	@ Cavalry	–						
32	6 January	@ Cavalry	–						
33	7 January (DH 1)	@ Cavalry	–						
34	7 January (DH 2)	@ Cavalry	–						
35	8 January	@ Cavalry	–						
36	11 January	Bite	–						
37	12 January	Bite	–						
38	13 January	Bite	–						
39	14 January	Bite	–						
40	15 January	Bite	–						
41	18 January	@ Heat	–						
42	19 January	@ Heat	–						
43	20 January	@ Heat	–						
44	21 January	@ Heat	–						
45	22 January	@ Heat	–						

== Roster ==
Sydney Blue Sox roster – 2011–12 ABL
Roster		Inactive Roster	Coaching staff
Pitchers Right-handed pitchers: 32 (Australia) Todd Grattan; 13 (Australia) Vaughan Harris; 24 (Australia) Lee Ingram; 36 (Australia) Wayne Lundgren; 35 (Australia) Chris Oxspring; 31 (United Kingdom) Josh Wells; 19 (Australia) Matthew Williams; Left-handed pitchers: 41 (Australia) Craig Anderson; 26 (Australia) Aiden Francis; 30 (South Korea) Koo Dae-Sung; 1 (Australia) Matthew Rae	Catchers: 33 (Australia) Craig Cant; 11 (Australia) Trent D'Antonio; 23 (Australia) Alex Johnson; Infielders: 14 (Australia) Joshua Dean; 16 (Australia) Michael Lysaught; 20 (Australia) Patrick Maat; 2 (Australia) Shannon Pender; 34 (Australia) Jacob Younis; Outfielders: 22 (United States) Tyler Collins; 27 (New Zealand) Boss Moanaroa; 8 (New Zealand) Moko Moanaroa; 3 (Australia) Trent Schmutter	Pitchers: -- (South Africa) Alessio Angelucci; -- (Australia) Matt Bennett; -- (Australia) Ryan Rowland-Smith; -- (Australia) Aaron Sookee; -- (Australia) Tim Stanford; -- (Australia) Jarryd Sullivan; -- (Australia) Brad Thomas; -- (Australia) Rich Thompson; -- (Australia) Brad Tippett; -- (Australia) Todd Van Steensel; -- (Australia) David Welch; Catchers: -- (Australia) Guy Edmonds; Infielders: -- (Australia) Mark Holland; -- (South Africa) Gift Ngoepe; Outfielders: -- (United States) Breland Brown; -- (Australia) Mitch Dening; -- (Australia) David Kandilas; -- (Australia) Trent Oeltjen	Manager: 21 (United States) Kevin Boles; Coaches: 35 (Australia) Chris Oxspring (Pitching Coach); 7 (Australia) Graheme Cassel (Coach); 6 (Australia) Jason Pospishil (Coach); 18 (Australia) Glenn Williams (Coach); : 7-day disabled list
Correct as of 8 November 2011.
