= 2011–12 Adelaide Bite season =

2011–12 Adelaide Bite
- League: Australian Baseball League
- Ballpark: Coopers Stadium
- City: Adelaide, South Australia
- Record: 20–25 (.444)
- Place: 3rd
- Owner: ABL
- General manager: Pat Kelly
- Manager: Tony Harris
- Television: In-House Broadcast

The 2011–12 Adelaide Bite season will be the second season for the team. As was the case for the previous season, the Bite will compete in the Australian Baseball League (ABL) with the other five foundation teams, and will again play its home games at Coopers Stadium.

== Regular season ==
=== Standings ===
Pos	Team	Pld	W	L	PCT	GB	Qualification
1	Perth Heat	45	34	11	.756	—	Advance to major semi final
2	Melbourne Aces	45	21	24	.467	13	Advance to major semi final
**3**	Adelaide Bite	**45**	**20**	**25**	.444 (Note: 1st tiebreaker: 16–11 (.593))	**14**	**Advance to minor semi final**
4	Sydney Blue Sox	45	20	25	.444 (Note: 1st tiebreaker: 13–14 (.481); 2nd tiebreaker: 5–4 (.556))	14	**Advance to minor semi final**
5	Brisbane Bandits	45	20	25	.444 (Note: 1st tiebreaker: 13–14 (.481); 2nd tiebreaker: 4–5 (.444))	14	
6	Canberra Cavalry	45	20	25	.444 (Note: 1st tiebreaker: 12–15 (.444))	14	

Rules for classification: Teams are ranked on winning percentage. In a multi-way tie, the winning percentage from games in head-to-head competition with the other tied teams is used as the first tiebreaker. In a multi-way tie, where after the first tiebreaker two teams are still tied, the winning percentage from games in head-to-head competition between the two tied teams is used as the second tiebreaker.

==== Record vs opponents ====
Opponent	W–L Record	Largest Victory			Largest Defeat			Current Streak
Opponent	W–L Record	Score	Date	Ground	Score	Date	Ground	Current Streak
Brisbane Bandits	–	–			–			
Canberra Cavalry	2–2	10–7	11 Nov 2011	Coopers Stadium	10–2	10 Nov 2011	Coopers Stadium	L1
Melbourne Aces	–	–			–			
Perth Heat	0–3	–			6–1	4 Nov 2011	Baseball Park	L3
Sydney Blue Sox	–	–			–			
Total	2–5	Against Canberra Cavalry			Against Canberra Cavalry			L1
Total	2–5	10–7	11 Nov 2011	Coopers Stadium	10–2	10 Nov 2011	Coopers Stadium	L1

=== Game log ===
W	Bite win
L	Bite loss
T	Bite tie
	Game postponed
**Bold**	Bite team member

2011–12 Game Log
November

#	Date	Opponent	Score	Win	Loss	Save	Crowd	Record	Ref
—	3 November	Postponed due to rain (5 November)							
1	4 November	@ Heat	L 6–1	Cameron Lamb (1–0)	**Dushan Ruzic** (0–1)		958	0–1	
—	5 November	Postponed due to rain (6 November)							
—	5 November	Postponed due to rain (TBA)							
2	6 November (DH 1)	@ Heat	L 7–4	Geoff Brown (1–0)	**Chris Lawson** (0–1)	Benn Grice (1)	—	0–2	
3	6 November (DH 2)	@ Heat	L 3–2	Benn Grice (1–0)	**Wayne Ough** (0–1)		952	0–3	
4	10 November	Cavalry	L 10–2	Brian Grening (1–1)	**Dushan Ruzic** (0–2)		876	0–4	
5	11 November	Cavalry	W 10–7	**Darren Fidge** (1–0)	Hayden Beard (0–1)	**Ryan Beckman** (1)	1,110	1–4	
6	12 November	Cavalry	W 3–2	**Paul Mildren** (1–0)	Tristan Crawford (0–1)	**Wayne Ough** (1)	1,360	2–4	
7	13 November	Cavalry	L 9–5	Steven Kent (2–0)	**Jandy Sena** (0–1)	Mike McGuire (1)	706	2–5	
8	24 November	Blue Sox	–						
9	25 November	Blue Sox	–						
10	26 November (DH 1)	Blue Sox	–						
11	26 November (DH 2)	Blue Sox	–						

December

#	Date	Opponent	Score	Win	Loss	Save	Crowd	Record	Ref
12	1 December	Aces	–						
13	2 December (DH 1)	Aces	–						
14	2 December (DH 2)	Aces	–						
15	3 December	Aces	–						
16	8 December	@ Cavalry	–						
17	9 December (DH 1)	@ Cavalry	–						
18	9 December (DH 2)	@ Cavalry	–						
19	10 December	@ Cavalry	–						
20	11 December	@ Cavalry	–						
21	15 December	@ Bandits	–						
22	16 December	@ Bandits	–						
23	17 December	@ Bandits	–						
24	18 December	@ Bandits	–						
25	29 December	Heat	–						
26	30 December	Heat	–						
27	31 December (DH 1)	Heat	–						
28	31 December (DH 2)	Heat	–						

January

#	Date	Opponent	Score	Win	Loss	Save	Crowd	Record	Ref
29	1 January	Heat	–						
30	5 January	@ Aces	–						
31	6 January	@ Aces	–						
32	7 January (DH 1)	@ Aces	–						
33	7 January (DH 2)	@ Aces	–						
34	8 January	@ Aces	–						
35	11 January	@ Blue Sox	–						
36	12 January	@ Blue Sox	–						
37	13 January	@ Blue Sox	–						
38	14 January	@ Blue Sox	–						
39	15 January	@ Blue Sox	–						
40	19 January	Bandits	–						
41	20 January	Bandits	–						
42	21 January (DH 1)	Bandits	–						
43	21 January (DH 2)	Bandits	–						
44	22 January	Bandits	–						

== Roster ==
Adelaide Bite roster – 2011–12 ABL
Active roster		Inactive roster	Coaching Staff
Pitchers Right-handed pitchers: 18 (United States) Reed Brown; 14 (Australia) Darren Fidge; 24 (Australia) Chris Lawson; 16 (Australia) Dakota Mitchell; 31 (Australia) Steven O'Connor; 33 (Australia) Wayne Ough; 38 (Australia) Dushan Ruzic; 29 (United States) Jandy Sena; Left-handed pitchers: 8 (Australia) Jackson Lodge; 25 (Australia) Paul Mildren	Catchers: 9 (Australia) Chris Adamson; 19 (Australia) Brendon Pett; Infielders: 6 (Australia) Josh Cakebread; 1 (Australia) Jeremy Cresswell; -- (Australia) Jesse Duval; 3 (Australia) Scott Gladstone; 15 (Taiwan) Chin-lung Hu; 4 (Australia) Mathew Smith; Outfielders: 23 (United States) Denny Almonte; 42 (United States) Calvin Anderson; 21 (Australia) Tom Brice; 20 (United States) James Jones; 5 (Australia) Ben Wigmore	Pitchers: -- (Australia) Tom Becker; -- (United States) Ryan Beckman; -- (Australia) Mitchell Fienemann; -- (Australia) Wilson Lee; -- (India) Rinku Singh; Catchers: -- (United States) Josiah Atkins; -- (Australia) Dylan Child; -- (United States) Carlton Tanabe; -- (Australia) Troy Weinert; Infielders: -- (Australia) Ben Lodge; 22 (Australia) Stefan Welch	Manager: 2 (Australia) Tony Harris; Coaches: 30 (Australia) Warwick Marks (Pitching Coach); 17 (Australia) Nathan Davidson (Coach); 10 (Australia) Mark Haylock (Coach); 28 (Australia) Craig Watts (Coach)
Current as of 8 November 2011.
