= 2011–12 Australian Baseball League season =

- League: Australian Baseball League
- Sport: Baseball
- Duration: 4 November 2011 – 12 February 2012
- Games: 118
- Teams: 6
- Total attendance: 123,886

Regular season
- Season MVP: Timothy Kennelly (PER)

Championship Series
- Venue: Baseball Park
- Champions: Perth Heat (2nd title)
- Runners-up: Melbourne Aces

Seasons
- ← 2010–11 2012–13 →

The 2011–12 Australian Baseball League season is the second Australian Baseball League (ABL) season, and is being held from 4 November 2011 to 12 February 2012. The season was scheduled to start on 3 November with a single game between the Perth Heat and the Adelaide Bite at Baseball Park in Perth, but the game was postponed due to wet weather.

The season consists of six teams competing in a 45-game schedule followed by a three-round postseason to determine the ABL champion. During the regular season, defending champions Perth Heat will participate in the 2011 Asia Series against the champions from Japan, South Korea and Taiwan. The 2011–12 champions will likewise qualify for the 2012 Asia Series.

At the conclusion of the regular season, the Perth Heat, Melbourne Aces, Adelaide Bite and Sydney Blue Sox progressed to the finals series, while the Brisbane Bandits and Canberra Cavalry were only eliminated from contention on the final day of the season. The Sydney Blue Sox eliminated the Adelaide Bite in the first round of the postseason, who were in turn eliminated by the Melbourne Aces in the second round. The Perth Heat defeated the Aces two games to one in the championship series, to win back–to–back ABL championships.

== Changes from 2010–11 season ==
=== Entry to Asia Series ===
Announced after the inaugural ABL season had been completed, the league's champions each season will be invited to the restarted Asia Series. The event had previously been contested between the winners of Nippon Professional Baseball's (NPB) Japan Series, Korea Professional Baseball's (KPB) Korean Series, Chinese Professional Baseball League's (CPBL) Taiwan Series, and China Baseball League's (CBL) championship series. The 2011 tournament will not feature the CBL's champions, but officials have stated that a team would participate in future editions. Unlike all four previous editions of the tournament which were held in Japan, the 2011 edition will be held in Taiwan. The tournament follows a round-robin format, where each team plays each other once. The top two teams then face each other in a single game to decide the champion.

The Asia Series is held in November, which would otherwise create a conflict for the ABL champion team as the following season would have already commenced. To avoid this, the League announced that during the 2011–12 season, the Perth Heat–2010–11 champions—would be scheduled to have a bye while competing in Taiwan.

=== Regular season schedule ===
The previous season included 40 games for each team and facing each team eight times, four at home and four on the road. This was expanded for the 2011–12 season to 45 games, by increasing one of the series between each team from four to five games, so that there were nine games between each team. This also resulted in three teams playing one more game at home than on the road, and the reverse for the other three teams.

To allow for Perth Heat's participation in the 2011 Asia Series, all six teams received a bye during the early rounds of the regular season. The Heat and Brisbane Bandits' bye was timed to line up with the tournament in round four, with the Adelaide Bite and Canberra Cavalry's bye in round three, and the Melbourne Aces and Sydney Blue Sox' bye in round five.

== Teams ==

Teams in the ABL
Team	City	State	Stadium	Ref
Adelaide Bite	Adelaide	South Australia	Coopers Stadium	
Brisbane Bandits	Brisbane	Queensland	Brisbane Exhibition Ground	
Canberra Cavalry	Canberra	Australian Capital Territory	Narrabundah Ballpark	
Melbourne Aces	Melbourne	Victoria	Melbourne Showgrounds	
Perth Heat	Perth	Western Australia	Baseball Park	
Sydney Blue Sox	Sydney	New South Wales	Blue Sox Stadium	

=== Venues ===
Each of the six teams returned from the previous season, and continued to use the same grounds for their home games. The name of Sydney's home ground changed during the off season, changing from Blacktown Olympic Park to Blacktown International Sportspark Sydney, and the main baseball diamond in the complex being called Blue Sox Stadium.

=== Rosters ===
As in the previous season, each team had an active roster of 22 players available each round. These players were drawn from 35-man squads. Each team had several foreign players in their squad, and each team included at least one player from the United States. Not counting Australia, there were players from eleven countries on the rosters of the teams participating.

Foreign players by country
Team	Number of players											
Team	GBR	GER	IND	ITA	JPN	KOR	NZL	PUR	RSA	TWN	USA	Total
Adelaide Bite			1							1	8	10
Brisbane Bandits				1	4		2				1	8
Canberra Cavalry					5			1			8	14
Melbourne Aces		1			2						4	7
Perth Heat											11	11
Sydney Blue Sox	1					1			2		2	6

== Regular season ==
Pos	Team	Pld	W	L	PCT	GB	Qualification
1	Perth Heat	45	34	11	.756	—	Advance to major semi final
2	Melbourne Aces	45	21	24	.467	13	Advance to major semi final
3	Adelaide Bite	45	20	25	.444 (Note: 1st tiebreaker: 16–11 (.593))	14	Advance to minor semi final
4	Sydney Blue Sox	45	20	25	.444 (Note: 1st tiebreaker: 13–14 (.481); 2nd tiebreaker: 5–4 (.556))	14	Advance to minor semi final
5	Brisbane Bandits	45	20	25	.444 (Note: 1st tiebreaker: 13–14 (.481); 2nd tiebreaker: 4–5 (.444))	14	
6	Canberra Cavalry	45	20	25	.444 (Note: 1st tiebreaker: 12–15 (.444))	14	

Rules for classification: Teams are ranked on winning percentage. In a multi-way tie, the winning percentage from games in head-to-head competition with the other tied teams is used as the first tiebreaker. In a multi-way tie, where after the first tiebreaker two teams are still tied, the winning percentage from games in head-to-head competition between the two tied teams is used as the second tiebreaker.

=== Statistical leaders ===
Batting leaders
Stat	Player (Note: Minimum 2.7 PAs per team game. Correct as of 23 January 2012.)	Team	Total
AVG	Brian Burgamy	Canberra Cavalry	.409
HR	Brad Harman	Melbourne Aces	15
RBI	Elliot Biddle	Melbourne Aces	42
R	Brian Burgamy	Canberra Cavalry	41
H	Brian Burgamy	Canberra Cavalry	67
SB	Mychal Givens	Perth Heat	15

Pitching leaders
Stat	Player (Note: Minimum 0.8 IP per team game. Correct as of 23 January 2012.)	Team	Total
W	Daniel Schmidt	Perth Heat	6
L	Dushan Ruzic	Adelaide Bite	5
ERA	Warwick Saupold	Perth Heat	1.41
K	Mike McGuire	Canberra Cavalry	63
IP	Warwick Saupold	Perth Heat	70
SV	Koo Dae-Sung	Sydney Blue Sox	8

=== All-Star Game ===
2011 ABL All-Star Game
	1	2	3	4	5	6	7	8	9	R	H	E
World All-Stars	1	2	1	0	0	0	3	1	0	8	15	0
Team Australia	0	0	0	0	0	3	1	1	0	5	9	2
- Date: 21 December 2011
- Venue: Baseball Park
- City: Perth
- MVP: (United States) Tyler Collins
- Attendance: 2,884

The 2011 Australian Baseball League All-Star Game, known as the 2011 ConocoPhillips Australia ABL All-Star Game due to naming rights sponsorship from ConocoPhillips, was the first exhibition game held by the Australian Baseball League (ABL) between Team Australia and a team of World All-Stars. The game was held on Wednesday, 21 December 2011 at Baseball Park in Perth, Western Australia, home of the Perth Heat. The players involved were selected from the rosters of the six ABL teams, with players not eligible for selection in the Australian team for international tournaments eligible for the World All-Stars.

The World All-Stars defeated Team Australia 8–5. Tyler Collins, designated hitter for the World All-Stars won the game's Most Valuable Player award.

==== Starting lineups ====
World All-Stars starters
Order	Player	Team	Position
1	James McOwen	Perth Heat	CF
2	Kenta Imamiya	Brisbane Bandits	2B
3	Denny Almonte	Adelaide Bite	RF
4	Brian Burgamy	Canberra Cavalry	1B
5	Alex Burg	Perth Heat	C
6	Tyler Collins	Sydney Blue Sox	DH
7	Ty Morrison	Canberra Cavalry	LF
8	Chin-lung Hu	Adelaide Bite	SS
9	Mychal Givens	Perth Heat	3B
	Mike McGuire	Canberra Cavalry	P

Team Australia starters
Order	Player	Team	Position
1	Mitchell Graham	Perth Heat	SS
2	Mitch Dening	Sydney Blue Sox	CF
3	Justin Huber	Melbourne Aces	DH
4	Stefan Welch	Adelaide Bite	1B
5	Timothy Kennelly	Perth Heat	3B
6	Tom Brice	Adelaide Bite	LF
7	Joshua Roberts	Brisbane Bandits	RF
8	Allan de San Miguel	Perth Heat	C
9	Scott Wearne	Melbourne Aces	2B
	Shane Lindsay	Melbourne Aces	P

==== Box score ====
21 December 2011 16:00 (UTC+08:00) at Baseball Park, Perth
Team	1	2	3	4	5	6	7	8	9	R	H	E
World All-Stars	1	2	1	0	0	0	3	1	0	8	15	0
Team Australia	0	0	0	0	0	3	1	1	0	5	9	2
WP: (WAS) Mike McGuire (1–0) LP: (AUS) Shane Lindsay (0–1) Sv: Koo Dae-Sung (1); Home runs: WAS: Tyler Collins (1), Denny Almonte (1); AUS: Joshua Roberts (1); Attendance: 2,884; Boxscore

== Postseason ==
2012 ABL Postseason logo

=== Format ===
At the conclusion of the regular season, the postseason involved the teams in a three-round structure. The first- and second-place teams played each other in the major semi-final, the winner of which proceeded directly to the championship series and the loser to the preliminary final. The winner of the minor semi-final between the third- and fourth-place teams also qualified for the preliminary final, while the loser was eliminated. Likewise, the winner of the preliminary final qualified for the championship series, the loser being eliminated. Unlike the previous postseason, where each round consisted of a best-of-three game series, both of the semi-finals and the preliminary final will be played out over best-of-five game series. The championship series once again used a best-of-three game format.

=== Bracket ===
Semi-Final Series
1	Perth Heat	3
2	Melbourne Aces	1
3	Adelaide Bite	1
4	Sydney Blue Sox	3

Premliminary Final Series
2	Melbourne Aces	3
4	Sydney Blue Sox	2

Championship Series
1	Perth Heat	2
2	Melbourne Aces	1

==== Qualification ====
The Perth Heat were the first team to clinch a postseason position when they defeated the Brisbane Bandits in Perth on 8 January, and then clinched a first place finish in their next game when they defeated the Canberra Cavalry in Canberra on 12 January. The three remaining positions in the postseason, and the teams that would take them, were not determined until the last game was finished. The Melbourne Aces finished a half-game ahead of a four-way tie between the Adelaide Bite, Brisbane Bandits, Canberra Cavalry and Sydney Blue Sox to secure the remaining spot in the major semi-final. The Bite and the Blue Sox finished third and fourth respectively after the ABL's tiebreakers were applied.

Until only a few hours before their final game of the season, Cavalry officials believed that regardless of the result in the game they would progress to the postseason based on their interpretation of the tiebreaking procedures. However they were informed by the League that was not the case. Canberra's interpretation was that once Adelaide were determined as having finished third, a separate tiebreaker would be held between themselves, Brisbane and Sydney and excluding Adelaide, which would have result in Canberra progressing. The actual process used was to continue with the next level of the tiebreaker as Brisbane and Sydney as they were still level after using the head-to-head records between the four teams. As Sydney had won their season series with Brisbane 5-4, Sydney claimed the final postseason position, Brisbane were left in fifth place, and Canberra in sixth.

== Awards ==
Player of the Week award winners
Round	Player	Team
1	John Tolisano	Canberra Cavalry
2	Masashi Nohara	Canberra Cavalry
3	Mitchell Graham	Perth Heat
4	John Edwards	Melbourne Aces
5	Denny Almonte	Adelaide Bite
6	James McOwen	Perth Heat
7	Calvin Anderson	Adelaide Bite
8	Brandon Barnes	Sydney Blue Sox
9	Brian Burgamy	Canberra Cavalry
10	Elliot Biddle	Melbourne Aces
11	Brian Burgamy	Canberra Cavalry

Pitcher of the Week award winners
Round	Player	Team
1	Benjamin Moore	Perth Heat
2	Mike McGuire	Canberra Cavalry
3	Nic Ungs	Melbourne Aces
4	Aidan Francis	Sydney Blue Sox
5	Yusei Kikuchi	Melbourne Aces
6	Hayden Beard	Canberra Cavalry
7	Warwick Saupold	Perth Heat
8	Alex Maestri	Brisbane Bandits
9	Warwick Saupold	Perth Heat
10	Dushan Ruzic	Adelaide Bite
11	Darren Fidge	Adelaide Bite

Season award winners
Award	Player	Team	Ref
Helms Award (League MVP)	Tim Kennelly	Perth Heat	
Championship Series MVP	Virgil Vasquez	Perth Heat	
Golden Glove	Allan de San Miguel	Perth Heat	
Pitcher of the Year	Warwick Saupold	Perth Heat	
Relief Pitcher of the Year	Benn Grice	Perth Heat	
Rookie of the Year	Aidan Francis	Sydney Blue Sox	
Silver Slugger	Brian Burgamy	Canberra Cavalry	
