= Jon Durket =

American baseball pitcher

Brisbane Bandits – No. 5
- Pitcher
- Born: 17 December 1986 (age 38); El Dorado Hills, California, U.S.
- Bats: Left Throws: Left

ABL debut
- 25 June, 2010, for the Lake Erie Crushers

ABL statistics (through 2011)
- Win–loss record: 0–0
- Earned run average: 4.26
- Strikeouts: 18

Jon Durket (born 17 December 1986) is an American baseball pitcher currently playing for the Brisbane Bandits in the Australian Baseball League.

== Career ==
Durket started his college baseball career at the University of California, San Diego but transferred to Wright State University to face Division-I calibre competition. He was named a first-team Horizon League pitcher in 2008, earning Pitcher of the Week honours twice.

After being sidelined for 11 months due to Tommy John surgery in 2009, he threw 29 innings in his fifth year at WSU before joining the Lake Erie Crushers of the Frontier League and the White Sands Pupfish of the Pecos League, making his professional baseball debut in 2010. When Durket signed his contract with the Frontier League in 2010 he became the fifth WSU player to go to professional ball that year, marking a new record for the school.

Durket was called up to the Brisbane Bandits after playing for the Redlands Rays in the Greater Brisbane League. He debuted for the Bandits on 4 November against the Canberra Cavalry throwing a scoreless inning in relief.

Throughout the ABL season, he predominantly threw multiple innings in each of his appearances on the mound. He fared better against right-handed batters, keeping them to a .196 average on the season. Durket threw 19 innings for the Bandits over 12 games, allowing 15 hits and striking out 18 on the year.
