= Daniel McGrath =

Australian professional baseball pitcher (born 1994)

Melbourne Aces – No. 5
- Pitcher
- Born: 7 July 1994 (age 31); Melbourne, Victoria
- Bats: Right Throws: Left
- Stats at Baseball Reference

Daniel McGrath (born 7 July 1994) is an Australian professional baseball pitcher for the Adelaide Giants of the Australian Baseball League. Listed at 6 feet 3 inches (1.91 m) and 205 pounds (93 kg), he throws left-handed and bats right-handed.

== Career ==
McGrath began his professional career with the Melbourne Aces of the Australian Baseball League. He signed with the Boston Red Sox in 2012. He made his professional debut in 2013 with the Gulf Coast League Red Sox and he was later promoted to the Low–A Lowell Spinners. In 12 games (11 starts) between the two teams, he was 3–4 with a 3.54 earned run average (ERA). He spent 2014 with the Single–A Greenville Drive where he compiled a 6–6 record and 4.07 ERA in 19 starts, and 2015 with the High–A Salem Red Sox where he posted a 4-6 record and 3.87 ERA in 17 starts.

McGrath returned to Salem in 2016, collecting an 8–6 record, 4.11 ERA, and 1.19 WHIP in 19 games started. In 2017, he once again returned to Salem, posting a 4–9 record and 4.98 ERA in 85 innings. McGrath spent the 2018 season with the Double–A Portland Sea Dogs, appearing in 33 games (11 starts) with a 3–3 record and 3.63 ERA. He spent most of the 2019 season with Portland, while also making two appearances with the Triple–A Pawtucket Red Sox; overall with both teams, he appeared in 29 games (16 starts) compiling a 7–1 record with a 1.98 ERA while striking out 116 batters in 122 2/3 innings pitched. He became a minor-league free agent on 2 November 2020.
