= Nathan Crawford =

Australian baseball player (born 1986)

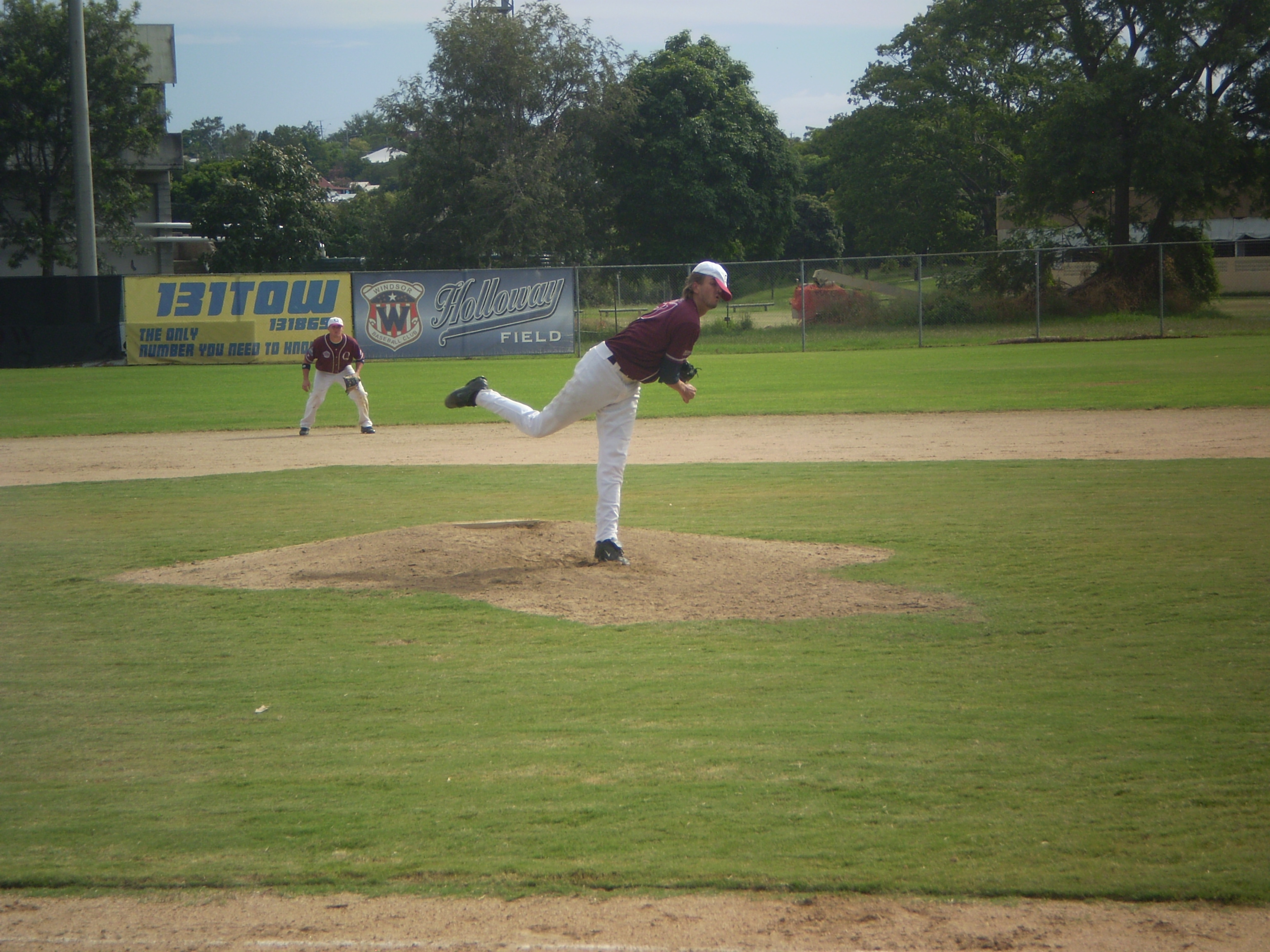
- Crawford pitching for the Queensland Rams

Auckland Tuatara – No. 30
- Pitcher
- Born: 5 November 1986 (age 38); Brisbane, Australia
- Bats: Right Throws: Right

ABL statistics (through 2011)
- Win–loss record: 1–1
- Earned run average: 2.45
- Strikeouts: 21

Nathan Robert Laurence Crawford (born 5 November 1986 in Brisbane, Queensland) is an Australian professional baseball pitcher for the Auckland Tuatara of the Australian Baseball League.

== Career ==
He was originally signed as a pitcher to the Minnesota Twins organization in 2005 for the Gulf Coast Twins until 2006.

Back in Australia, Crawford plays for the Windsor Royals winning 5 consecutive Queensland titles. He has represented the Queensland Rams in the Claxton Shield. Currently in the Australian Baseball League he has pitched for the Canberra Cavalry. As well as the Brisbane Bandits He is younger brother to Tristan Crawford who has played for the Australia national baseball team and is also playing for the Cavalry.
