= Mychal Givens =

American baseball player (born 1990)

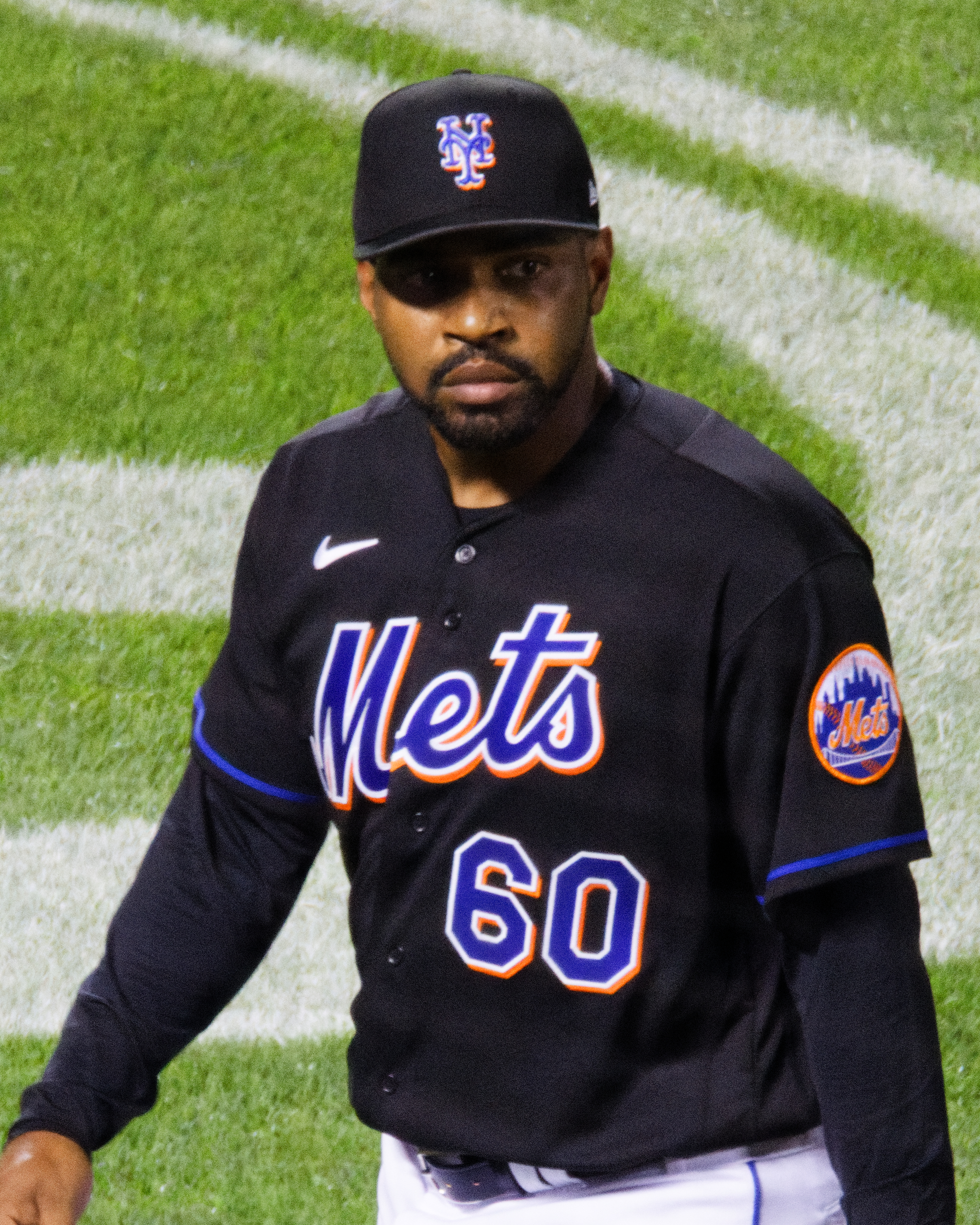
- Givens with the Mets in 2022
- Pitcher
- Born: May 13, 1990 (age 36); Tampa, Florida, U.S.
- Batted: Right Threw: Right

MLB debut
- June 24, 2015, for the Baltimore Orioles

Last MLB appearance
- May 31, 2023, for the Baltimore Orioles

MLB statistics
- Win–loss record: 32–24
- Earned run average: 3.47
- Strikeouts: 539
- Stats at Baseball Reference

Teams
- Baltimore Orioles (2015–2020); Colorado Rockies (2020–2021); Cincinnati Reds (2021); Chicago Cubs (2022); New York Mets (2022); Baltimore Orioles (2023)
Medals
Men's baseball
Representing United States
World Baseball Classic
Gold medal – first place	2017 Los Angeles	Team

Mychal Antonio Givens (born May 13, 1990) is an American former professional baseball pitcher. He has previously played in Major League Baseball (MLB) for the Baltimore Orioles, Colorado Rockies, Cincinnati Reds, Chicago Cubs, and New York Mets.

== Career ==
=== Amateur career ===
Givens attended Henry B. Plant High School in Tampa, Florida, where he played for the school's baseball team as a pitcher and an infielder. In his junior and senior years, he was named All-State. In 2007, Givens was selected to play for the United States 18-and-under national baseball team.

Givens was selected for the 2008 Aflac All-American High School Baseball Game (East Team) played at Dodger Stadium, in which he both pitched and played shortstop. At the Aflac Banquet, Givens won the Jackie Robinson Award as the nation's top high school player.

Entering his 2009 senior season, Rawlings named Givens to the Preseason Senior All-American First Team and Florida All-Region First Team. As a senior, he had an 8–4 win–loss record and a 1.71 earned run average (ERA) with 113 strikeouts in 78 innings as a pitcher, and a .374 batting average with four home runs and 31 runs batted in as a hitter.

In high school, Givens also played on Plant's basketball team.

=== Draft and minor leagues ===
The Baltimore Orioles selected Givens in the second round, with the 54th overall selection, of the 2009 MLB draft. He signed with the Orioles, receiving a reported $800,000 signing bonus rather than enrolling at Oklahoma State University. The Orioles began to develop Givens as a shortstop. Playing for the Delmarva Shorebirds of the Single-A South Atlantic League in 2010, he was batting .222 when he sprained his thumb. He required surgery to correct the injury.

In 2011, Givens returned to Delmarva, and hit .195. He was demoted to the Aberdeen IronBirds of the Low-A New York–Penn League. Givens played for the Perth Heat in 2011–12 Australian Baseball League season and played in the 2011 Australian Baseball League All-Star Game. He batted .243 in Delmarva in 2012.

Before the 2013 season, the Orioles approached Givens about becoming a pitcher. In 2013, he pitched 40 innings for Delmarva, recording 36 strikeouts and a 4.22 ERA. With the Frederick Keys of the High-A Carolina League in 2014, he had a 1–2 record and a 3.24 ERA. The Orioles assigned Givens to the Glendale Desert Dogs of the Arizona Fall League after the 2014 season. The Orioles opted not to add Givens on their 40-man roster, which would have prevented him from being eligible in the Rule 5 draft. Givens went unselected.

With the Bowie Baysox of the Double-A Eastern League, Givens began the 2015 season with a 3–1 win–loss record, a 1.60 ERA and 12 saves with 54 strikeouts in 39 1/3 innings.

=== Baltimore Orioles ===
==== 2015–2016 ====
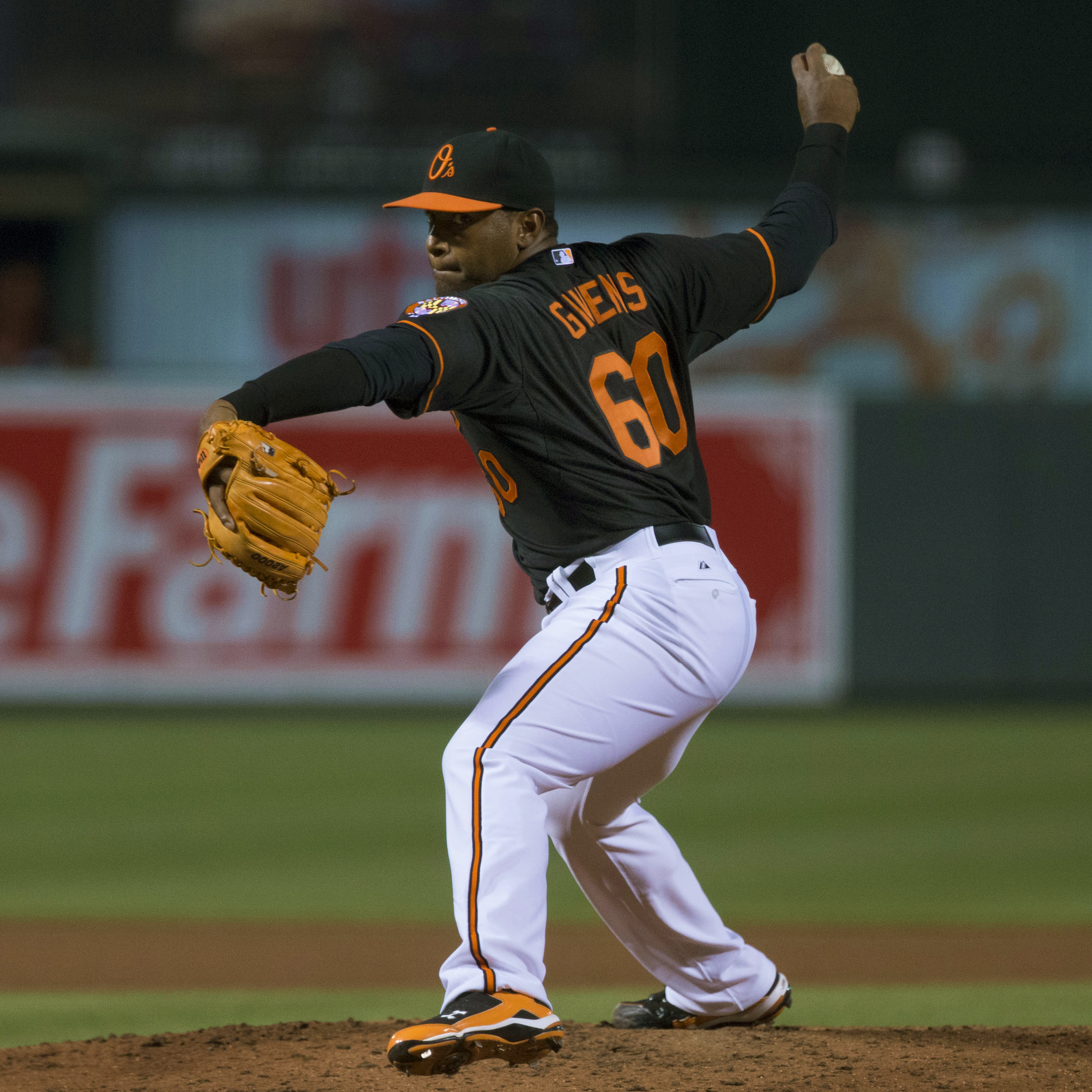
Givens with the Orioles in 2015

The Orioles promoted Givens to the major leagues on June 20, 2015. He made his major league debut on June 24, pitching one scoreless inning, striking out one batter, and was optioned back to Bowie the next day. He was named to the Eastern League All-Star Game. On July 31, he was recalled after the Orioles traded Tommy Hunter and designated Bud Norris for assignment. He pitched 1 2/3 innings while striking out two batters and earning his first career Major League win against the Detroit Tigers. Givens went 2–0 in 2015 with a 1.80 ERA in 22 games, with 30.0 innings pitched. Givens struck out 38 batters while only walking six and had a WHIP of 0.867.

Givens made the Orioles' 2016 Opening Day roster and made his first relief appearance on Opening Day. He threw 1 1/3 innings, giving up two runs while striking out two batters. The Orioles would eventually win the game 3–2 on a walk-off single. After allowing three runs in his first two relief appearances of the season, Givens saw his ERA sitting at 13.50. Givens would go on to throw ten consecutive scoreless innings, before giving up another run. He ended the month of April, having appeared in 12 games, throwing 12 innings, striking out 21, walking seven, and pitching to a 3.00 ERA. Givens also went 2–0 in the month. In May, Givens went 1–0, while pitching to a 1.93 ERA in 11 innings in eight appearances. Givens earned the win for the Orioles on June 2 and 3rd, making him 5–0 on the year and 7–0 for his career. According to STATS, LLC, Givens was the first Orioles pitcher to begin his Major League career with seven consecutive wins as a reliever. Givens would win three more games out of the bullpen in 2016. Givens finished his 2016 season with 96 strikeouts and a 3.13 ERA in 74 2/3 innings in 66 appearances. He pitched to a 1.27 WHIP and an 8–2 record while striking out 11.6 batters per nine innings pitched.

Givens made his postseason debut in the Wild Card Game against the Toronto Blue Jays. He entered the game with a 2–2 tie and runners on the corners. He forced a first-pitch double play. He ended up striking out three batters in 2 1/3 scoreless innings pitched, in what ended up being a 5–2 Orioles loss in 11 innings.

==== 2017–2020 ====
Givens was selected to Team USA's 2017 World Baseball Classic roster. Givens helped Team USA to win the gold medal at the 2017 World Baseball Classic, as he made three relief pitching appearances.

Out of relief, Givens earned his first victory of the 2017 season on April 8, against the New York Yankees after throwing a perfect inning while striking out two batters. Givens pitched to a 2.25 ERA before the break, striking out 44 batters in 44 innings pitched, picking up six wins and three saves along the way. Overall, he finished with a 2.75 ERA in 69 games, striking out 88 in 78 2/3 innings.

Givens began the 2018 season as the Orioles' setup man. With a 0–7 record in 69 appearances, he also had 9 saves in 13 attempts, eight of ten as the team's closer after the late-July fire sale trades of Zach Britton, Brad Brach, and Darren O'Day.

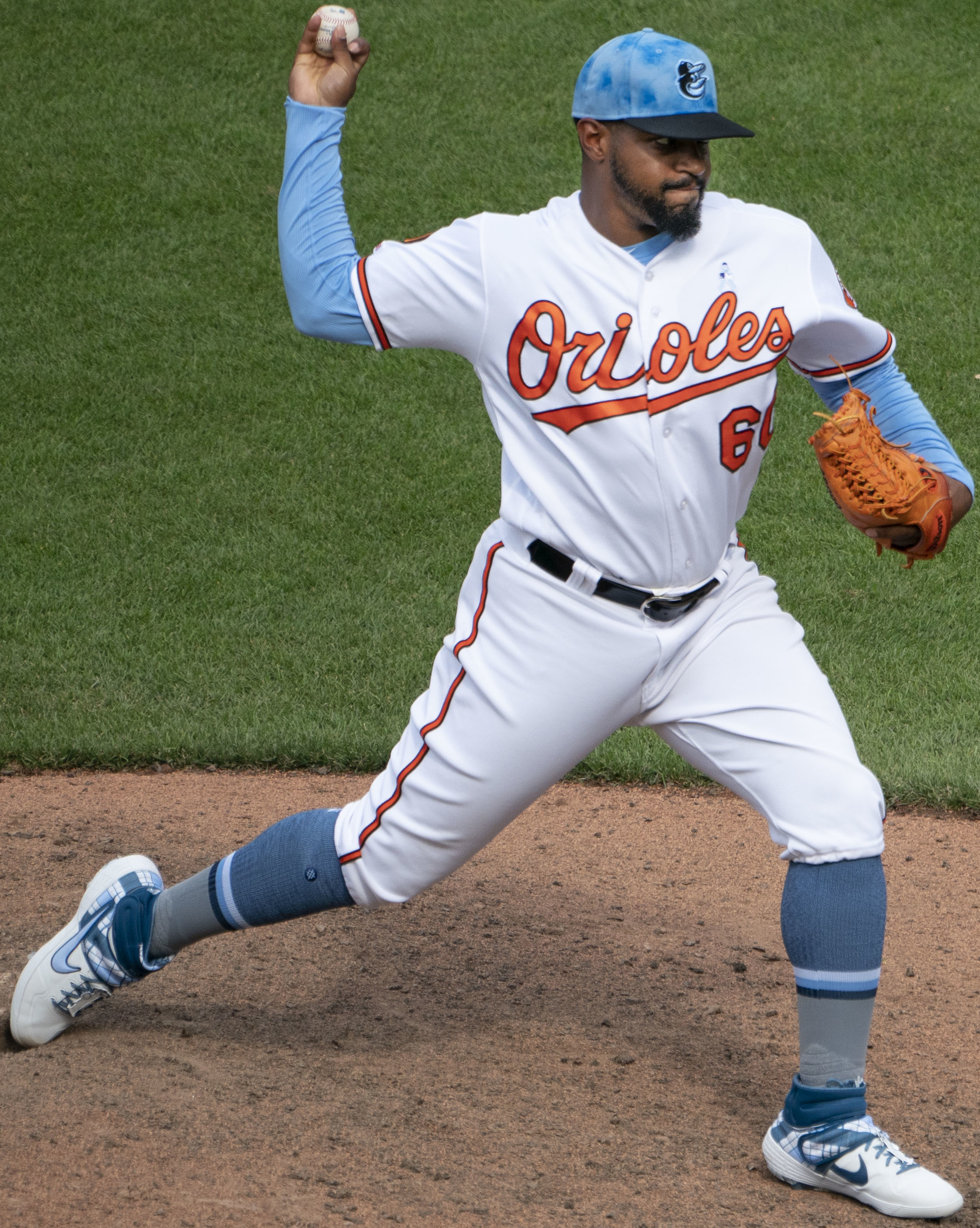
Givens pitching for the Baltimore Orioles in 2019

Givens was tasked to be the Orioles closer to begin the 2019 season. He saved 11 of 19 opportunities, but his eighth and ninth inning ERAs went from 5.55 and 2.96 respectively the previous year to 1.93 and 6.69. He returned to the setup role for his final five outings. He appeared in 58 games with 86 strikeouts in 63 innings. In 2020 with the Orioles, Givens posted an 0–1 record with a 1.38 ERA across 12 appearances.

=== Colorado Rockies ===
The Orioles traded Givens to the Colorado Rockies for Tyler Nevin, Terrin Vavra and a player to be named later on August 30, 2020. Minor-league outfielder Mishael Deson was sent to Baltimore to complete the transaction nineteen days later on September 18. He finished the season with an ERA of 6.75 in 9 1/3 innings. In 31 appearances for the Rockies in 2021, Givens posted a 2.73 ERA with 34 strikeouts.

=== Cincinnati Reds ===
On July 28, 2021, the Rockies traded Givens to the Cincinnati Reds in exchange for Case Williams and pitcher Noah Davis.

=== Chicago Cubs ===
On March 23, 2022, Givens officially signed a one-year deal with the Chicago Cubs.

=== New York Mets ===
On August 2, 2022, Givens was traded to the New York Mets for pitcher Saul Gonzalez.

On November 9, 2022, the Mets declined their half of a mutual option for the 2023 season, and Givens became a free agent.

=== Baltimore Orioles (second stint) ===
On December 21, 2022, Givens signed a one-year, $3 million contract with the Baltimore Orioles that includes a mutual option for 2024. He began the 2023 season on the injured list due to left knee inflammation, and made his first appearance of the season on May 21. On June 2, Givens was placed back on the injured list with right shoulder inflammation. He was transferred to the 60-day injured list on July 1. On August 13, he was activated from the injured list and subsequently designated for assignment. He was released by Baltimore on August 19.

=== Miami Marlins ===
On March 10, 2024, Givens signed a minor league contract with the Miami Marlins. In 9 appearances for the Triple–A Jacksonville Jumbo Shrimp, he struggled to a 7.94 ERA with 13 strikeouts across 11 1/3 innings. On May 2, Givens triggered the opt–out clause in his contract and became a free agent.

== Personal life ==
Givens was raised by great-grandmother Liduvina Padilla and her late husband Pedro Padilla.

Givens married his long time girlfriend Tiffani in 2014, and had two daughters together. Mychal filed for divorce in early 2019. In early 2020, Givens founded the Givens Back Foundation, a charitable organization focused on providing access to sports, unique opportunities through sports, and the teaching of life lessons outside of the classroom, for those in communities most in need. The Givens Back Foundation hosts a number of charity events each year, including Thanksgiving turkey drives, Christmas events to help those in need and the Foundation's annual "Blitzball" tournament.
