= Takumi Akiyama =

Japanese baseball player (born 1991)

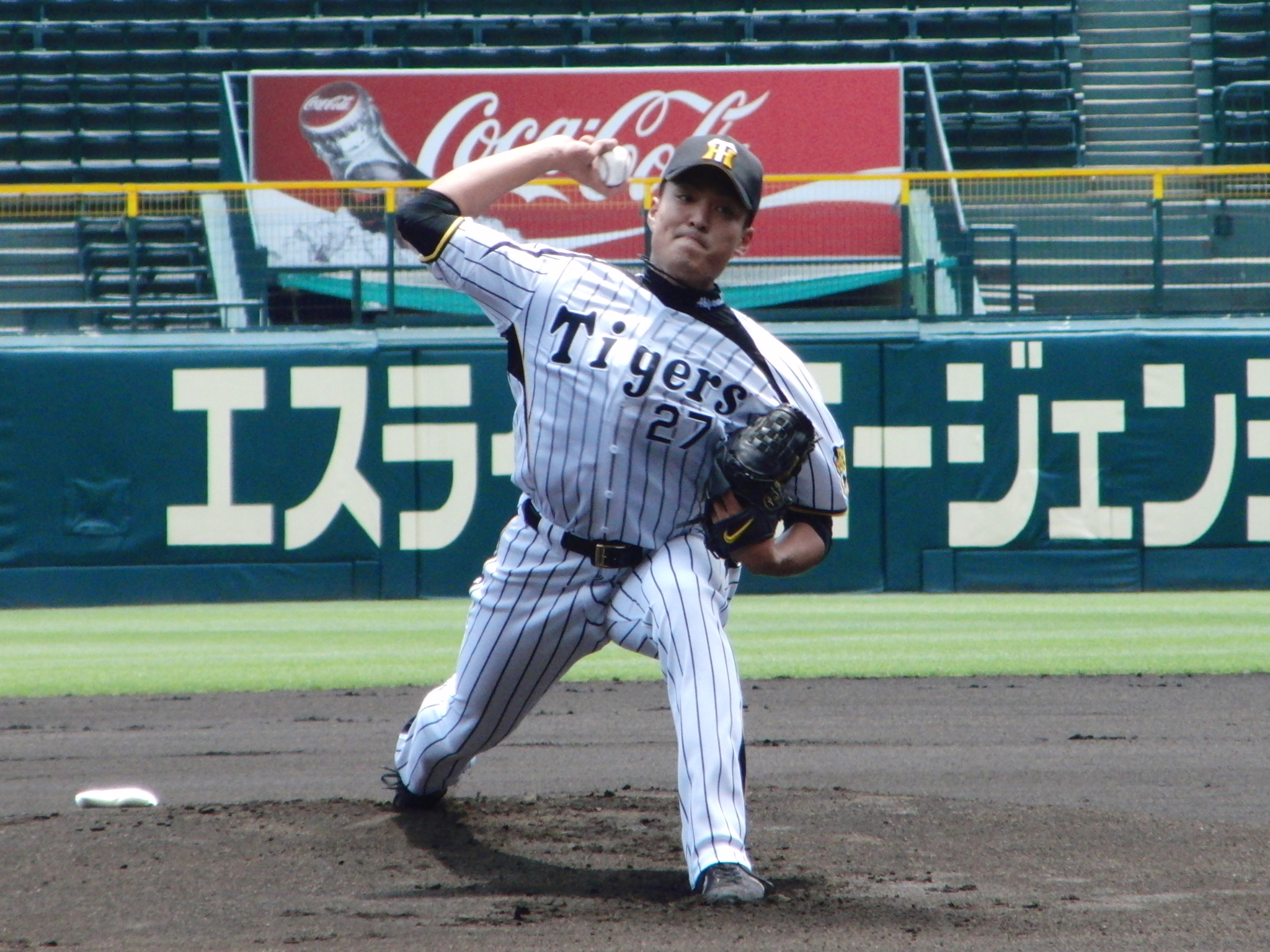
- Akiyama with the Hanshin Tigers
- Pitcher
- Born: April 26, 1991 (age 35); Marugame, Kagawa, Japan
- Bats: Left Throws: Right

NPB debut
- August 21, 2010, for the Hanshin Tigers

NPB statistics (through 2023 season)
- Win–loss record: 49-44
- ERA: 3.66
- Strikeouts: 540
- Stats at Baseball Reference

Teams
- Hanshin Tigers (2010–2024)

Takumi Akiyama (秋山 拓巳, Akiyama Takumi; born April 26, 1991) is a Japanese former professional baseball pitcher. He previously played for the Hanshin Tigers of Nippon Professional Baseball (NPB).

== Amateur career ==
Takumi's interest in baseball started when he was 3 as he played catch with his dad in the suburbs of Marugame City. He initially played little league baseball for the Imazu Junior Sports Club, but when his family had to move to Ehime, he joined the Saijō Juniors and even got to compete in national tournaments. He continued playing for the Saijō Seniors, and also got selected to play for the national team in an international tournament in his last year in junior high. He grew up a Yomiuri Giants fan as he lived in an area that only broadcasts Giants games.

He continued to play for Saijō High School where he excelled both as a hitter and pitcher. He batted cleanup from his first year, and as the senior ace pitcher, he carried his team in the prefectural and regional tournaments, all the way to both the Spring and Summer Koshien tournaments of 2009. Despite not making the finals of both national tournaments, he finished high school with an impressive 48 home run record which earned him the nickname "Iyo Godzilla" (Godzilla from Ehime).

== Professional career ==
Akiyama was the Hanshin Tigers' 4th round pick in the 2009 annual professional baseball draft. He signed a 40 million yen contract with the Tigers for a starting annual salary of 6 million yen, and was assigned jersey number 27.

2010

He lost his debut match against the Giants on August 21 (6 innings, 4 ERs). A week later, he managed to pull through his next start against the Swallows and earned his first career win, a feat that was last achieved by a high-school drafted Hanshin rookie 24 years ago by Shōji Tōyama in 1986. His streak continued on September 12 when he went the distance and achieved a shutout victory with no walks against the Swallows, becoming the 7th high-school drafted rookie in the Central League to ever achieve the feat. His next outings were not as victorious however, and he finished the season with a 4–3 record and a 3.35 ERA.

2011

Due to a neck injury, he spent most of the season in the minors. He was given the chance to start the September 28 game against the Swallows, but he failed to secure the win and ended his season with 0–1. During postseason, he was loaned to the Canberra Cavalry to play in the Australian Baseball League together with teammates Fumiya Araki and Yuhei Kai. He took the mound for four matches and topped the league as a starter with an ERA of 1.23 during his loan period. He struck out 16, gave up 13 hits, 10 walks and 3 earned runs (1.05 WHIP) in 22 innings before going back to Japan.

2012 to 2016

Akiyama spent most of the next four years in the minors pitching in Western League games, with only a handful of main squad appearances. In 2013, while he came 2nd in minor league wins and ERA, he failed to secure any wins in his 8 main league starts (0-3). This was also the case in 2014, where he topped the league in wins (9) and strike outs (116) but had zero main squad wins. He did get to pitch in the 2014 NPB Tigers-Giants Union vs MLB All-Star during post-season, where he gave up 1 solo homerun in 1 inning. He had two quality starts in 2015 but the succeeding relievers failed to hold the fort, and for the 3rd time in a row, Akiyama ended the season without a single win.

Unfazed, he continued to pitch well in the minors in 2016, and topped the league in wins (9) and came 2nd in ERA (2.08). He got called to the main squad as a reliever for a couple of outings in August, and was returned to the starting rotation in September. Finally on September 16, he got to earn his 1st win in 4 years on his start against the Baystars. His jersey number was changed to 46 during post-season, and was also awarded the team's Farm MVP.

2017

This was Akiyama's comeback year as he started the season as part of the main starting rotation. He bagged his first win on April 12 against the Baystars, and became a mainstay as he continued to pitch quality starts on his next outings. On May 16, he went the distance and struck out 12 batters in 9 solid innings, earning him his first complete win since 2010. Despite having suffered an injury on his right hamstring early in August, he notched his 10th win on August 18, and even managed to hit his first career home run off Dragons reliever Junki Itoh, the first Hanshin pitcher to do so in Nagoya Dome. He finished the season as Hanshin's top starter with a 12–6 record, with a personal best ERA of 2.99 out of 25 starts. He also topped both leagues for the fewest number of walks issued by a starter (16), with a walk percentage of 1.24 and a K/BB of 7.69. Post-season, he and Masahiro Nakatani were given the 2017 Tomoaki Kanemoto Fresh Award during fan appreciation day on November 25, and received 5 million yen each. His performance during the season also earned him an estimated 30 million pay raise, quadrupling his previous salary to 41 million yen.

2018

This was a less productive year for Akiyama as he saw fewer starts and struggled with control early in the season. On May 8 however, he recorded a shutout victory and hit a home run against the Giants at Tokyo Dome. He became the first pitcher to toss a shutout victory and hit a home run in the same game since Colby Lewis against Yakult in 2009, and the first Hanshin pitcher since Kazuyuki Yamamoto against the Giants in 1982. He started having problems with his knee after he picked up his fifth victory on June 7, and got taken off the active roster. He got a few more starts after finishing rehab, but was unsuccessful. He ended the season at 5–10 with a 3.86 ERA out of 17 starts. Post-season, he underwent surgery to clean out his right knee at a hospital in Osaka.

2019

Akiyama saw fewer starts in 2019. To test his performance after surgery, he was made to start the season in the farms. After winning his first 3 games (2.70 ERA), he got his first main squad outing on April 11. He promptly lost after giving up 5 runs and was immediately removed from the roster. He was called back two weeks after and pitched 2 winning games, but after losing on May 18 against the Carps, he was sent back to the farms. He didn't get another start until July 25, then a few more scattered outings until September. He finished with 4-3 and a 4.26 ERA out of 10 games. While he got awarded for the most Western League wins (10) for the 3rd time, but his subpar performance in the main squad earned him an 8 million pay cut, bringing his annual salary down to 32 million yen.

2020

2020 Pitching Stats
Pitch	Percent Thrown	Hit Rate	Strikeout + Fanning Rate
Four-seam	45%	25%	24%
Cutter	22%	24%	26%
Forkball	20%	17%	14%
Shuuto	6%	36%	14%
Knuckle curve	8%	15%	32%
Slider	0.5%	67%	13%

He had a rocky start in 2020, pitching a couple of bad outings (4.9 ERA in 5 games). But a productive line up helped earn him 3 wins by the end of July, less than 2 months into a pandemic-shortened season. Despite allowing 5 runs, he notched a complete win against the Swallows on July 28, almost two and a half years since he last accomplished this feat in May 2018. His pitching picked up after this and he produced 6 quality starts out of 7 outings in the following weeks (6 earned runs, 1.25 ERA). In spite of this however, the team's hitting slump coupled with fielding errors, some he committed himself, only earned him 3 wins until the end of September. Aided by reliable relievers, he picked up 5 more wins including another complete win on October 25 against the Giants, and finished 11-3 (tied with Yuki Nishi for most wins) and a career high ERA of 2.89 and 0.97 WHIP. His last 3 outings and wins pushed Hanshin ahead of the tight race against the Dragons to finish 2nd in the rankings. He was particularly effective against the Carps line up who managed to score only 6 runs in 6 games against him.

2024

On September 13, 2024, Akiyama announced that he would be retiring following the conclusion of the season.

== Pitching style ==
With an overhand delivery, Akiyama throws a four-seam fastball in the 130–140 km/h (81–87 mph) range (maxed at 148 km/h (92 mph) as his main pitch, alternating with a cutter and forkball. He mixes them with a shuuto, knuckle curve and a rare slider.
