= Daniel Schmidt (baseball) =

Australian baseball player (born 1988)

- Pitcher
- Born: 27 April 1988 (age 38); Cairns, Queensland, Australia
- Bats: Left Throws: Left

Daniel John Schmidt (born 27 April 1988) is an Australian professional baseball pitcher for the Perth Heat of the Australian Baseball League.

== Career ==
Schmidt was a Melville Braves junior in Western Australia and played in the junior state representative and schoolboys teams, before being selected in the extended 35 man Western Heelers squad for the 2005 Claxton Shield.

Schmidt first played at national level as a 20-year-old with the Perth Heat in the 2008 Claxton Shield. He would be part of the Heat team that won the Shield that year and again in 2009, pitching a 6 2/3 scoreless start in the deciding championship game.

Following his Claxton Shield success, Schmidt began continued playing for the Heat in the inaugural Australian Baseball League season with the team winning the Championship that year and the 2011–12 Australian Baseball League season. He led the league in wins both years with six.

With the Heat, he continued to be a mainstay in the rotation until a rocky 2015–16 Australian Baseball League season saw him put in a bullpen and spot starter role for the next two seasons, before being moved there full-time from 2018 onwards in a variety of roles.

Due to his consistency and regular role, he holds a variety of Australian Baseball League career records that include most wins (37), losses (27), earned runs (235), runs (301), hits (573) and home-runs (52) allowed.

In 2010, Schmidt played in the American Association with the Grand Prairie AirHogs and in 2011 he played for the Fort Worth Cats. He later played with the Brockton Rox in the Can-Am League and in 2013 for the Alexandria Aces and Edinburg Roadrunners in the United League Baseball.

Schmidt was selected as a member of the Australia national baseball team for the 2019 WBSC Premier12.
