= Sean Jarrett =

American baseball player

Brisbane Bandits – No. 38
- Pitcher
- Born: April 26, 1984 (age 42); Westminster, Colorado
- Bats: Right Throws: Right

Sean Jarrett (born April 26, 1984) is a professional baseball player who plays as a pitcher for the Brisbane Bandits in the Australian Baseball League and in the Colorado Rockies organisation.

Jarrett was drafted by the Colorado Rockies in the 20th round of the 2006 MLB June Amateur Draft. He played the entire 2011 season with the Rockies AA affiliate, the Tulsa Drillers.
