= Steven Chambers =

Australian baseball player (born 1990)

Canberra Cavalry – No. 22
- Pitcher
- Born: 8 November 1990 (age 36); Gold Coast, Queensland, Australia
- Bats: Right Throws: Right
- Stats at Baseball Reference
Medals
Men's baseball
Representing Australia
Haarlem Baseball Week
Bronze medal – third place	2016 Haarlem	National team

Steven Chambers (born 8 November 1990) is an Australian professional baseball player for the Canberra Cavalry of the Australian Baseball League.

He was a member of the Australia national baseball team in the 2017 World Baseball Classic Qualification and 2016 Haarlem Baseball Week.

On 12 February 2019 he invited for spring training of Yokohama DeNA BayStars of Nippon Professional Baseball (NPB) with Steven Kent.
