= Matthew Williams (baseball) =

Australian professional baseball pitcher (born 1987)

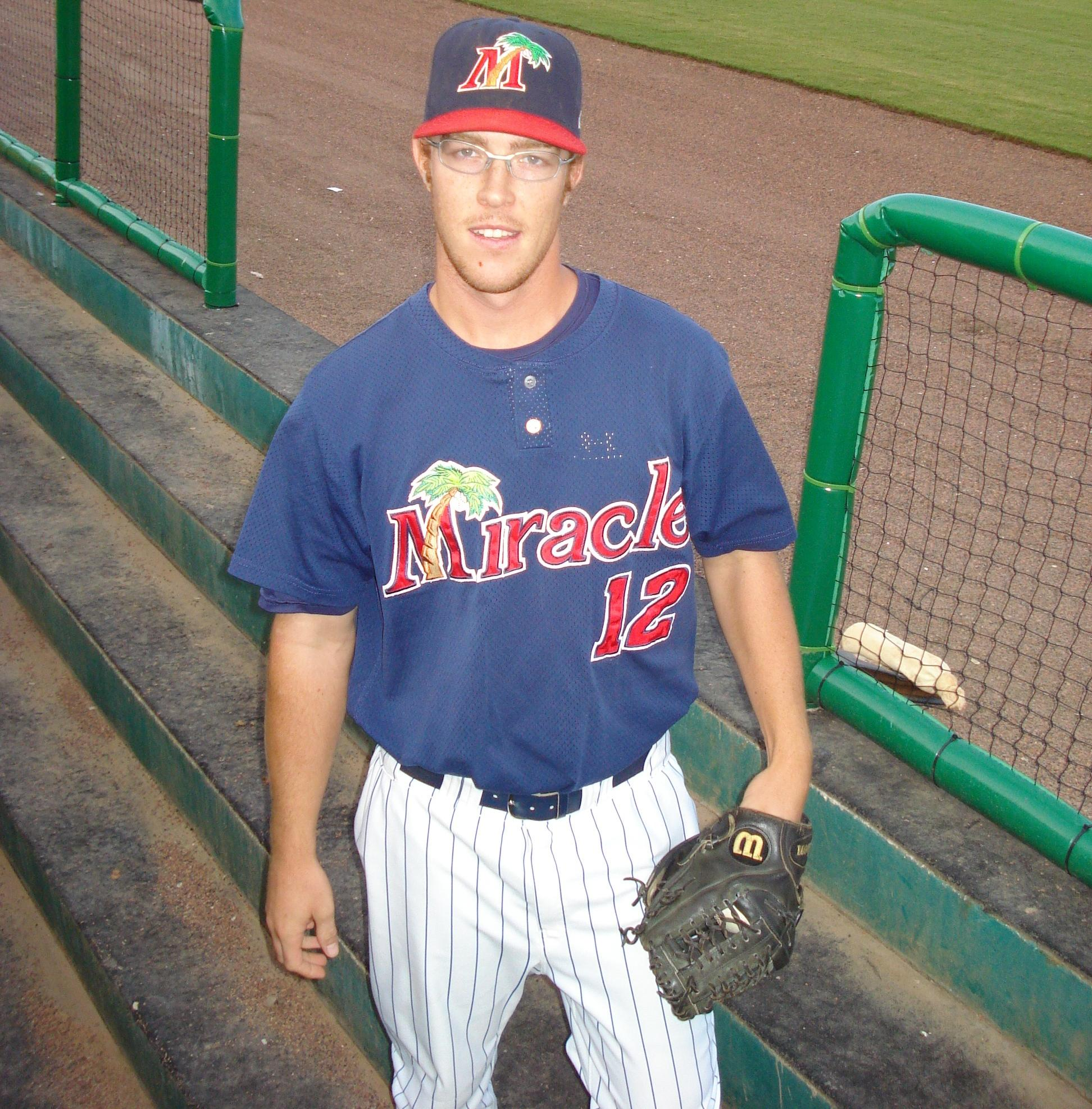
- Williams with the Fort Myers Miracle in 2008
- Pitcher
- Born: 28 February 1987 (age 39); Camden, New South Wales, Australia
- Bats: Right Throws: Right
- Stats at Baseball Reference
Medals
Men's baseball
Representing Australia
Haarlem Baseball Week
Bronze medal – third place	2016 Haarlem	National team

Matthew Jarrad Williams (28 February 1987) is an Australian former professional baseball pitcher who played for the Australian national baseball team in international competition. He also played in the Minnesota Twins organisation, who signed him as a non-drafted free agent in 2004.

== Career ==
Williams began the 2008 season with the Beloit Snappers of the Midwest League. Going 2–0 with seven saves and a 2.09 earned run average (ERA) and 42 strikeouts over 38.2 innings pitched earned him a Midwest League All-Star selection, and a promotion to the Twins' advanced-A affiliate in Fort Myers. With the Miracle, he went 2–2 with a 3.35 ERA and 37 strikeouts in twenty appearances. He also started two games for the first time in his minor league career with the Miracle. In his starts, he was 1–0 with a 1.00 ERA—giving up one earned run over nine total innings.

During his stint with the Miracle, Williams was one of two of the team's players on the ever-increasing list of Australian born baseball players, as he was born in Camden, Australia (the other being infielder/outfielder Daniel Berg).

== Australian National Team ==
He played for the Australian national baseball team in the 2009 Baseball World Cup.

In 2010, Williams reached the double-A level of the Twins organization, splitting the season between Fort Myers and the New Britain Rock Cats. After the 2010 season, Williams left the Twins organization to return to his native Australia. He played for the Sydney Blue Sox until 2012, then moved on to the Adelaide Bite, where he played from 2013 to 2017.
