= Simon Morriss =

Australian baseball player

Brisbane Bandits – No. 24
- Pitcher
- Born: 21 August 1985 (age 41); Brisbane, Australia
- Bats: Right Throws: Right

ABL debut
- 11 November, 2010, for the Brisbane Bandits

ABL statistics (through 2011)
- Win–loss record: 2–2
- Earned run average: 6.20
- Strikeouts: 25

Simon Morriss (born 21 August 1985 in Brisbane, Queensland) is an Australian pitcher for the Brisbane Bandits.

== Career ==
Morriss made his Claxton Shield debut in 2008 for the Queensland Rams. He continued to pitch for the Rams until the formation of the Australian Baseball League in 2010. Named as pitching captain for the Bandits, he made his debut on opening night against the Perth Heat where he pitched two hitless innings to record the save. Throughout the season, he was used intermittently as starting pitcher, long reliever, setup pitcher and closer going 2–1 and 2 saves with a 5.63 ERA. Morriss fared much better at home with a 2.37 ERA, with his ERA inflated by extremely hitter-friendly ballparks such as the Melbourne Showgrounds.

Morriss works full-time at his own carpentry business. His father Greg is also a scout for the Houston Astros.
