= Wayne Ough =

Australian baseball player (born 1978)

- Pitcher
- Born: 27 November 1978 (age 47); Werribee, Victoria, Australia
- Bats: Right Throws: Right
- Stats at Baseball Reference

Olympic medal record

Men's Baseball
Silver medal – second place	Athens 2004	Team competition

Wayne Ough (born 27 November 1978) is an Australian former professional baseball pitcher who also competed in the Olympics. Listed at 1.88 metres (6 ft 2 in) and 93 kilograms (205 lb), he threw and batted right-handed.

Drafted by the New York Mets in the 15th round of the 2000 Major League Baseball draft, Ough spent five seasons in the minor leagues, from 2000 to 2004. He then competed in the Can-Am League, an independent baseball league, during 2005 and 2006, and in the Australian Baseball League in 2010, 2011, and 2014.

Ough played in the Czech Baseball Extraliga during three seasons. In 2009 and 2010 for Draci Brno and in 2011 for Technika Brno.

In 2004, Ough was part of the Australian Olympic baseball team that earned a silver medal in the baseball tournament at the Athens Olympics. He pitched in three games without allowing an earned run.
