= Tristan Crawford =

Australian baseball player (born 1982)

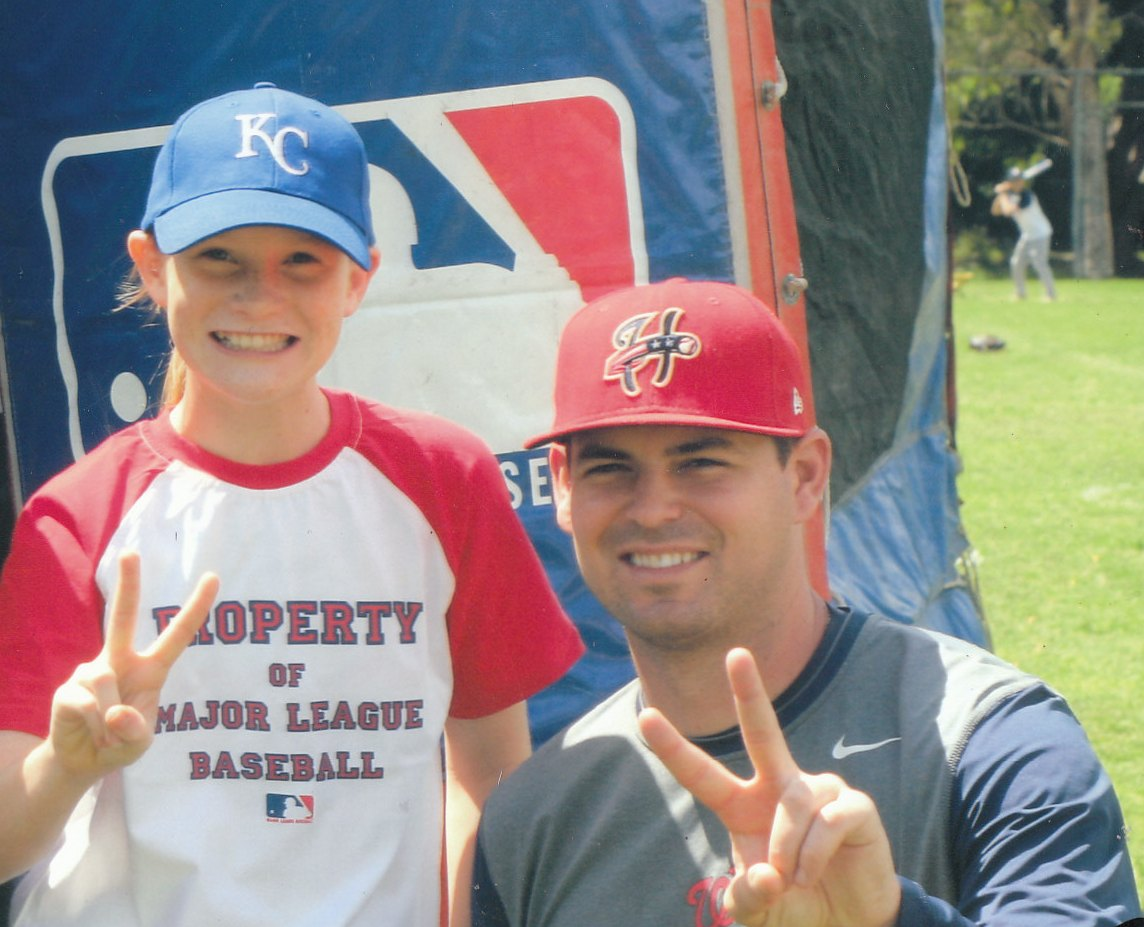
- Crawford with a fan in Australia

Brisbane Bandits – No. 39
- Pitcher
- Born: 22 July 1982 (age 43); Anchorage, Alaska, U.S.
- Bats: Right Throws: Right

ABL debut
- 5 November, 2011, for the Canberra Cavalry

ABL statistics (through 2011)
- Win–loss record: 0–0
- Earned run average: 1.80
- Strikeouts: 4
- Stats at Baseball Reference

Tristan Gary Francis Crawford (born 22 July 1982) is an Australian professional baseball pitcher for the Brisbane Bandits.

== Career ==
Crawford was signed to the Minnesota Twins organisation in 2000 and played Double-A and Triple-A until 2008.

Crawford used to play for the Runcorn Indians and the Redlands Rays but now resides with the Windsor Royals. He also has represented the Australian team at the 2006 World Baseball Classic and the Queensland Rams in the Claxton Shield. He debuted for the Cavalry in 2011 against his home team, the Brisbane Bandits, throwing 5 innings for 1 earned run.
