= Shane Lindsay =

Australian baseball player (born 1985)

- Pitcher
- Born: 25 January 1985 (age 41); Melbourne, Australia
- Batted: Right Threw: Right

MLB debut
- 2 September, 2011, for the Chicago White Sox

Last appearance
- 12 September, 2011, for the Chicago White Sox

MLB statistics
- Win–loss record: 0–0
- Earned run average: 12.00
- Strikeouts: 6
- Stats at Baseball Reference

Teams
- Chicago White Sox (2011)

Medal record

Men's baseball

Representing Australia

Haarlem Baseball Week
Bronze medal – third place	2016 Haarlem	National team

Shane Anthony Lindsay (born 25 January 1985) is an Australian former professional baseball pitcher. He played in Major League Baseball (MLB) for the Chicago White Sox.

== Baseball career ==
=== Colorado Rockies ===
Lindsay was signed as an international free agent by the Colorado Rockies in 2003. He made his Minor League debut in 2004, and spent 2005 and 2006 with the Casper Rockies, Tri-City Dust Devils, and the Asheville Tourists. He missed the entire 2007 season after having surgery on his right shoulder and then spent the 2008 season with two teams, playing for the Tourists and the Modesto Nuts, going 2–3 in 10 games in Modesto.

=== New York Yankees/Cleveland Indians ===
On 14 May 2010, Lindsay was claimed off of waivers by the New York Yankees and placed on the 40-man roster. He was designated for assignment 12 days later to make room for Chad Gaudin on the 25-man roster. On 1 June 2010, Lindsay was claimed off waivers by the Cleveland Indians and assigned to the Double-A Akron Aeros. He played in 12 games with Akron and 7 with the Triple-A Columbus Clippers.

=== Chicago White Sox ===
On 9 January 2011, Lindsay was signed to a minor league contract by the Chicago White Sox. He played in 5 games with the Birmingham Barons and 45 with the Charlotte Knights. He was 3–3 with a 2.18 ERA with the two teams combined.

Lindsay made his Major League debut on 2 September 2011 against the Detroit Tigers, pitching one scoreless inning of relief. He appeared in 4 games for the White Sox, with an ERA of 12.00. On 14 October, Lindsay was removed from the 40-man roster and sent outright to Charlotte. He chose to become a free agent after the season.

=== Melbourne Aces ===
In the offseason in both 2010 and 2011 Lindsay pitched for the Melbourne Aces in the Australian Baseball League. Primarily a reliever in the minor leagues, he became a starter in the Australian league.

=== Los Angeles Dodgers ===
Lindsay signed a minor league contract with the Los Angeles Dodgers in November 2011 and was assigned to the Triple-A Albuquerque Isotopes. Lindsay pitched in 8 games for the Isotopes, with an 0–1 record and a 5.00 ERA. He also walked 12 batters in only 9 innings of work. The Dodgers released him on 22 May 2012.

=== Chicago Cubs ===
Lindsay subsequently signed a minor league contract with the Chicago Cubs on 31 May 2012. On 15 June, Lindsay was released by the Cubs organization.

=== Chicago White Sox (second stint) ===
On 30 June 2012, the Chicago White Sox signed Lindsay to a minor league contract.

=== Return To Melbourne ===
After not pitching professionally for more than 2 years, Lindsay pitched for the Aces in 2015 and for a few appearances in 2016.
