= Chris Mowday =

Australian baseball player

- Relief pitcher
- Born: 24 August 1981 (age 45); Brisbane, Queensland, Australia
- Bats: Right Throws: Right

CPBL statistics
- Win–loss record: 1–1
- Earned run average: 8.59
- Strikeouts: 3
- Stats at Baseball Reference

Teams
- Chinatrust Whales (2007)

Christopher Mowday (born 24 August 1981) is an Australian former baseball pitcher.

== Career ==
Mowday started his professional baseball career when in 1997 he signed with the Toronto Blue Jays organisation as an international free agent. He spent six years, including 177 minor league appearances in the minor league system, being traded to the Oakland Athletics and Chicago Cubs before being released in the 2004 season.

Since being released, Mowday returned to amateur baseball in the Greater Brisbane League and played for the Queensland Rams, who he debuted for in the International Baseball League of Australia. Mowday would go on to play in independent and European baseball leagues.

In 2010, he was announced on the Brisbane Bandits inaugural Australian Baseball League roster for the 2010–11 season. He debuted in the team's first ever match, picking up the win in relief. At the conclusion of the season, Mowday recorded a league leading 6 wins and 2.74 ERA in 20 appearances.

Mowday has been affectionately nicknamed after the fictional baseball character Kenny Powers presumably due to his similar hairstyle.
