= Dushan Ruzic =

Australian baseball player (born 1982)

- Pitcher
- Born: January 5, 1982 (age 44); Darwin, Northern Territory, Australia
- Bats: Right Throws: Right
- Stats at Baseball Reference

Dushan Ruzic (born 5 January 1982) is an Australian former professional baseball pitcher. He played professionally for the Cincinnati Reds, Toronto Blue Jays, and the Florida Marlins. He also played for Rotterdam Neptunus of the Honkbal Hoofdklasse and Rimini of the Italian Baseball League. He has also played for the Adelaide Bite, Melbourne Aces, and Canberra Cavalry of the Australian Baseball League.

== Career ==
Ruzic played for the Gulf Coast League Marlins in 2005. He played for the Sarasota Reds and Chattanooga Lookouts in 2007. He played in the Honkbal Hoofdklasse for the DOOR Neptunus from 2008 through 2010. He also played for the Adelaide Bite of the Australian Baseball League in 2010 and 2011. Ruzic played for the Telemarket Rimini of the Italian Baseball League in 2011.

== International career ==
Ruzic competed for the Australia national baseball team in the 2009 Baseball World Cup, 2013 World Baseball Classic, 2017 World Baseball Classic and 2019 WBSC Premier12.
