= Adelaide Giants =

Australian professional baseball team

- Logo

Information
- League: Australian Baseball League
- Location: Adelaide, South Australia
- Ballpark: Diamond Sports Stadium
- Founded: 2009 (Note: The Adelaide Giants played their inaugural season in 2010–11.)
- Post-season championships: 3 (2022–23, 2023–24, 2025-2026)
- Minor premierships: 2 (2014–15, 2023–24)
- Former name: Adelaide Bite
- Ownership: (Australia) Ross Pelligra
- General manager: Nathan Davison
- Manager: (Australia) Chris Adamson

The Adelaide Giants are a professional baseball team that plays in the Australian Baseball League. They are one of the six foundation franchises of the league, in its first incarnation from 1989 to 1999. The team adopted the name Bite or Adelaide Bite when the league relaunched in 2010, officially Adelaide ETSA Bite, when the South Australian power company ETSA Utilities became its major sponsor. After an ETSA rebrand to SA Power Networks, the Bite became the Adelaide Bite, proudly presented by SA Power Networks. In 2019, the team was rebranded as Adelaide Giants.

== History ==
=== 1989–1999 ===
Adelaide Giants

Information
- League: Australian Baseball League (1989-1999), Australian Baseball League
- Location: Adelaide
- Ballpark: Norwood Oval, Diamond Sports SA (West Beach)
- Founded: 1989–90
- Folded: 1998–99
- Nickname: Giants
- League championships: 1
- 1998–99: ?-? (1st)
- Lost semi-finals, finished 3rd
- Colours: Royal Blue, Red, Yellow and White

Current uniforms
| Home | Away |

The Adelaide Giants were one of the foundation members of the original Australian Baseball League (ABL). They competed in all 10 seasons but however never once made the league's final playoff series, though they did appear in two Semi-Final series. They also have the novelty of winning the first ever ABL match against the Perth Heat in the 1989–90 season. Now members of the reformed Australian Baseball League, and after a spell known as the Adelaide Bite, the team is back to the original name of Giants.

During its original run from 1989 to 1999, ABL clubs were affiliated with Major League Baseball teams who would generally send Minor League prospects to play in Australia during the North American off season. The Giants were affiliated with the famed Los Angeles Dodgers and were only ABL team to stay affiliated with the same team throughout the history of the original ABL. One of the Dodgers Minor League prospects to play for the Giants was catcher Paul Lo Duca who was with the team in 1995–96. Lo Duca went on to make his Major League debut for the Dodgers in 1998 and would appear in four All-Star Games (2003–2006) before his retirement in 2008.

Giants infielder and Australian representative at the 1996 Summer Olympics Andrew Scott holds the ABL and club record for most appearances with 469 games played.

=== Adelaide Bite ===
During the 2010 through 2018 ABL seasons, the team was named the Adelaide Bite. That name was a reference to the Great Australian Bight — a nearby hydrographic landmark — as well as to the great white shark, a species which inhabits the coast of South Australia.

Adelaide's first general manager was former New York Yankees infielder Pat Kelly. He served as the General Manager from 2009 to 2013.

The team's former home ballpark was the historic Norwood Oval in Norwood, South Australia. They made the move to West Beach in the 2016–17 season.

The Giants have multiple alumni who have played in MLB in following years and many players who play for Team Australia in an international level. The team is made up of up-and-coming MLB draft prospects who play minor league baseball in the USA or established Australian players. Former big-league players often play in the ABL.

In 2018, the Adelaide Football Club bought the Adelaide Bite. They sold the team to Pelligra in 2021.

=== 2019 rebranding ===
The franchise rebranded as the Adelaide Giants in time for the 2019 ABL season, a move that marked a return to the identity that graced Adelaide's entry in the original incarnation of the ABL from 1989 to 1999.

=== 2023 ===
On 22 January 2023, the team won its first title in the Championship Series.

== Game day atmosphere ==
The Adelaide Bite were known for their unique sports atmosphere. Their specialty was the Shark Tank — a section where fans could sit on the field right next to the Adelaide Bite home dugout and interact with players. They also served a pig roast on the field as well as a drinks package.

The nature of baseball allows kids to run around and chase foul balls. They even can run on the field in-between innings. There are many catchy songs, quirky walk up music selections from the players, and many in-game activations.

In 2016, players from the Adelaide Football Club, Port Adelaide Football Club and Adelaide Strikers showed up to participate in a pre-game home-run derby that brought thousands of people to the stadium.

Various entertainers appeared for their games including Ethan Hall (or "Hiccup Kid") who sang the national anthem while hiccuping before a game.

As the Bite, the team was known for its quirky off-field antics. On 1 April 2016, the Bite fooled the world by announcing that baseball legend Derek Jeter would be joining the club as a player manager. It would have been the most high-profile signing in Australian sports' history. The practical joke garnered international headlines including a story in The New York Times and the Yankees' Twitter account.

== Team Australia players ==
The Adelaide Bite have sent numerous players to represent the Australia national baseball team on various international stages including the World Baseball Classic, World Baseball Classic qualification, Olympic baseball and Honkbalweek in Haarlem.

| Player name | Years Represented | Level(s) |
|---|---|---|
| Angus Roeger | 2015 | 2015 ABL All-Star Game |
| Stefan Welch | 2009–2016 | World Baseball Classic |
| Steven Chambers | 2015–2016 | World Baseball Classic Qualifiers, Honkbalweek, ABL All-Star |
| Josh Tols | 2015–present | World Baseball Classic Qualifiers, Honkbalweek, ABL All-Star, Japan Series |
| Matthew Williams | 2009–2016 | Baseball World Cup, World Baseball Classic, World Baseball Classic Qualifiers, ABL All Star |
| Tom Brice | 2002–2008 | Olympics, Baseball World Cup |
| Wilson Lee | 2016 | Honkbalweek |
| Dushan Ruzic | 2009–2016 | Baseball World Cup, World Baseball Classic, Honkbalweek |
| Aaron Whitefield | 2016–present | Australian National Senior Team |
| Mitch Edwards | 2019 | Senior Team Call Up |
| Curtis Mead | 2020–present | Senior Team Call Up |
| Rixon Wingrove | 2022–present | Call up to Japan Series |
| Todd Van Steensel | 2022 | Call up to Japan Series |
| Mitch Neunborn | 2020–present | Senior Team Call Up + Japan Series |

== Notable alumni ==
The Giants/Bite have seen 26 players move on to MLB after playing in Adelaide. Since the ABL reformed in 2010, Adelaide has had 14 players progress to the Big Leagues:

These players are:

- Paul Lo Duca
- Steve Mintz
- Luke Prokopec
- Shayne Bennett
- Mark Hutton
- Adam Riggs
- Felix Rodriguez
- Will Brunson
- Pat Ahearne
- Matt Herges
- Jared Weaver
- Pat Kelly
- Brandon Bantz (2010–2011)
- James Jones (2011–2012)
- Brandon Maurer (2011–2012)
- Blake Smith (2011–2012)
- Ji-Man Choi (2012–2013)
- Andrew Kittredge (2012–2013)
- John Holdzkom (2013–14)
- Brandon Dixon (2014–2015)
- Rocky Gale (2014–2015)
- Travis Demeritte (2015–16)
- Curtis Mead (2017)
- Aaron Whitefield (2018–2021)
- Luke Williams (2021)
- Logan O'Hoppe (2019/20)

Adelaide is also home to five Helms Award Winners (MVP) since 2010. They are:

- Andrew Scott (1997)
- Jamie McOwen (2011)
- Aaron Miller (2015)
- Markus Solbach (2018)
- Aaron Whitefield (2020)

Other notable alumni:

- Tom Brice – 2004 Olympic silver medalist for Team Australia
- Rinku Singh – The subject of the film Million Dollar Arm. Played for the Bite in 2011–12.
- Mitch Dening – Australian baseball player. Played in the top league in Japan for the Tokyo Yakult Swallows.
- Chen Kuan-jen – Taiwanese baseball player. CPBL Rookie of the Year (2006). Played for the Bite in 2017–18.
- Chang Tai-shan – Taiwanese baseball player. Holds record for all-time most CPBL home runs. Played for the Bite in 2017–18.

== Results ==
=== 1989–1999 results ===
| Season | Finish |
|---|---|
| 1989–90 | 5th |
| 1990–91 | 3rd |
| 1991–92 | 5th |
| 1992–93 | 7th |
| 1993–94 | 4th |
| 1994–95 | 5th |
| 1995–96 | 7th |
| 1996–97 | 3rd |
| 1997–98 | 6th |
| 1998–99 | 3rd |

=== Current club ===
The team has known heartbreak in the postseason. It has qualified for the playoffs in six of the ABL's ten campaigns since the league relaunched in 2010, advanced to the Australian Baseball League Championships Series four times, but has not won a title up to that point. As the Adelaide Bite, the franchise twice lost the championship series to the Perth Heat (2010–11 and 2014–15) and was bested by the Brisbane Bandits once (2015–16). As the Adelaide Giants, the team was defeated by the Melbourne Aces (2019–20). This ended when they beat the Perth Heat (2022–23), ending the 43-year old drought. They would also go on to win their second title the following season, also against Perth (2023–24)

| Season | Record | Finals | Manager | Team MVP |
|---|---|---|---|---|
| 2010–11 | 23–17 (3rd place) | Lost in Championship Series to Perth (1–2) | Tony Harris | |
| 2011–12 | 20–25 (4th place) | Lost in semi finals to Sydney (1–3) | Tony Harris | |
| 2012–13 | 21–25 (5th place) | No finals | Tony Harris | |
| 2013–14 | 21–25 (5th place) | No finals | Charles Aliano/Brooke Knight | |
| 2014–15 | 32–16 (1st place, minor premiers) | Lost in Championship Series to Perth (1–2) | Brooke Knight | Aaron Miller |
| 2015–16 | 30–26 (3rd place) | Lost in Championship Series to Brisbane (0–2) | Steve Mintz | |
| 2016–17 | 23–17 (2nd place) | Lost in Preliminary Final Series to Brisbane (1–2) | Steve Mintz | |
| 2017–18 | 11–29 (6th place) | No finals | Chris Adamson | |
| 2018–19 | 19–21 (6th place) | No finals | Chris Adamson | Markus Solbach |
| 2019–20 | 26–14 (1st place) | Lost in Championship Series to Melbourne (2–0) | Chris Adamson | Aaron Whitefield |
| 2020–21 | 11–10 (3rd place) | Lost in Elimination Final to Canberra | Chris Adamson | Curtis Mead |
| 2021–22 | Cancelled season (COVID) | | | |
| 2022–23 | 21–12 (2nd place) | Won in Championship Series against Perth (2–1) | Chris Adamson | |
| 2023-24 | 29-11 (1st place, minor premiers) | Won in Championship Series against Perth (2-1) | Chris Adamson | |

== See also ==
- List of current Australian Baseball League team rosters
- Sport in Australia
- Australian Baseball
- Australian Baseball League (1989-1999)
