= Perth Heat =

Australian professional baseball team

- Logo

Information
- League: Australian Baseball League
- Location: Perth, Western Australia
- Ballpark: Empire Ballpark
- Founded: 1989
- League championships: 4 (2010–11, 2011–12, 2013–14, 2014–15)
- Division championships: 2 (2011–12, 2013–14)
- Colours: Red; Black; White
- Ownership: Rory Vassallo
- Manager: Andrew Kyle

Current uniforms
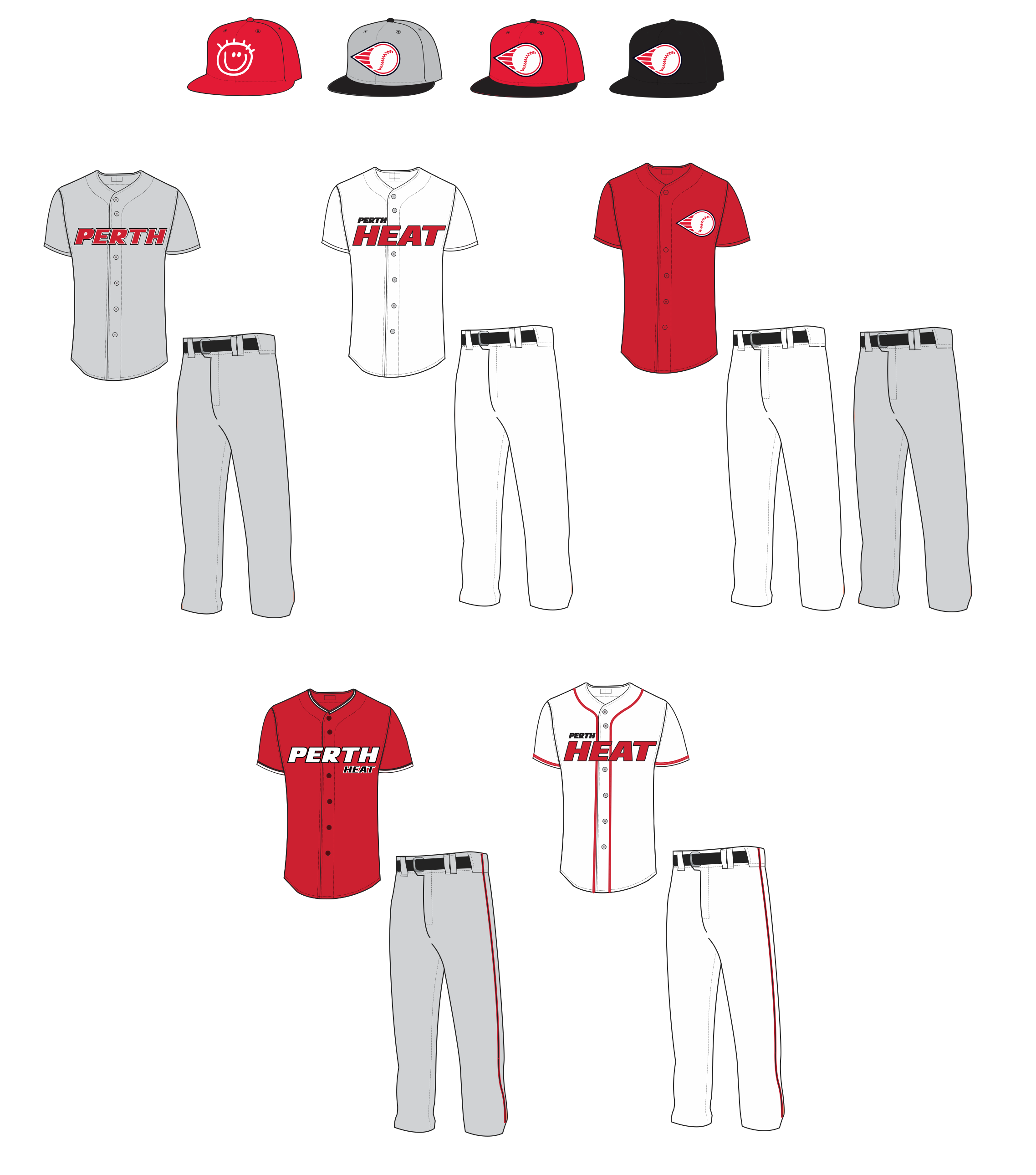

The Perth Heat is a baseball team in the current Australian Baseball League and a founding member of the Australian Baseball League. It is the most successful team in ABL history, winning 15 Claxton Shields.

== Australian Baseball League (1989–1999) ==
Perth Heat won the ABL championship in 1990–91, when Graeme Lloyd pitched the Heat to a Game 5 championship win on the Gold Coast against the Dolphins to take the 3–2 series win. The Heat won a second championship in 1996–97 defeating the Brisbane Bandits.

During the original Australian Baseball League the Perth Heat were the second-most successful team in the league, winning the title twice and finishing runner-up a further three times.

=== 1989–1999 results ===
Season	Finish
1989–90	4th
1990–91	2nd
1991–92	1st
1992–93	1st
1993–94	2nd
1994–95	2nd
1995–96	3rd
1996–97	1st
1997–98	5th
1998–99	6th

== Claxton Shield (2005–2009) ==
In 2005, the name was resurrected by the Western Australian baseball team competing in the Claxton Shield. This re-branding of the team, together with the facilities of the new Tom Bateman Reserve in the suburb of Thornlie, reportedly contributed to increased interest in the sport in Western Australia, with many exhibition matches attracting more than 2,000 spectators, very high compared with usual Australian attendances for the sport.

Western Australia hosted the 2007 Claxton Shield tournament at Tom Bateman Reserve, with games also being played in the nearby regional centres of Rockingham and Mandurah. Spectator numbers were between 1,000 and 1,500, and the grand final, eventually won by Victoria against New South Wales, attracted 1,500. However, the Heat was unable to win a game during the tournament.

In late 2007, the name was further applied to the state's junior representatives, with the under-14, under-16 and under-18 teams being renamed the "WA State Heat".

The Heat won back-to-back Claxton Shield titles in 2008 and 2009. In 2008, it won the Southern Division with an 8–4 record and swept New South Wales in the best-of-three semi final series in Sydney. In 2009, the Heat finished the regular season with the best record, at 12–4, and came back from losing the first game to beat New South Wales in three games in the Grand Final. The WA side led the deciding third game throughout but blew a 2–0 lead in the top of the ninth inning. With the game set for extra innings, outfielder Daniel Floyd hit a walk-off single to deliver back-to-back titles for Perth.

== Australian Baseball League (2010 – present) ==
In early 2010, plans for a reformed Australian Baseball League were announced. The ABL, which is partly funded by Major League Baseball features six teams; the other five are Sydney Blue Sox, Melbourne Aces, Canberra Cavalry, Brisbane Bandits and Adelaide Bite. The first season featured a 40-game home-and-away regular season, with the top four teams qualifying for a three-round playoff format. The Heat's first game was at the Brisbane Exhibition Ground against the Brisbane Bandits on 11 November, won by Brisbane 8–3. The Heat won their first home game 4–2, on 17 November against the Adelaide Bite at the newly renovated Baseball Park.

The Heat made several key signings in preparation for the new season. 2008 Claxton Shield MVP Clint Balgera returned to the team after sitting out the last two seasons, while pitching prospect Liam Baron is another key acquisition, with the former collegiate pitcher expected to lead the Heat's rotation. Allan de San Miguel, Warwick Saupold, Daniel Schmidt and Mitch Graham, who have been some of the Heat's most significant players in recent Claxton Shield seasons, as well as Jesse Baron, Clint Knight, Brandon Dale, Aaron Bonomi and Tyler Anderson have also signed on for the upcoming season. However, 2009 MVP and former Los Angeles Angels of Anaheim minor league centre fielder Nick Kimpton is leaving the Heat to return home to play for Canberra, while Tim Kennelly will miss the first half of the season after it was announced he will be sent to the Arizona Fall League by the Philadelphia Phillies.

In early October, Perth announced a deal with the Baltimore Orioles, which saw the Major League Baseball outfit send four of their top prospects to play for the Heat during the first ABL season. Left-handed starter Cole McCurry, right-handed reliever Brett Jacobson and outfielders Ronnie Welty and Robbie Widlansky were the prospects Perth secured. Jacobson is the most noteworthy of the four, having been drafted by the Detroit Tigers in the 2008 MLB draft, before he was traded for Aubrey Huff. Jacobson was traded by the Orioles to Minnesota in the middle of the ABL season and he returned to America.

=== 2010–11 season ===
The Heat started the 2010–11 season with a loss to the Brisbane Bandits, but quickly bounced back by winning the final three games of the series. They then won two out of four games in their next three series' before sweeping the Canberra Cavalry at home. Perth's season hit a snag when they lost every match of a four-game series to the Sydney Blue Sox but bounced back emphatically. The Heat won their next eight games before splitting the final home series against the Melbourne Aces to finish the regular season in second position. Among the highlights of the season were Widlansky, who led the league in hits with 52, and Daniel Schmidt, who was tied with Brisbane's Chris Mowday for most wins (six).

Perth faced Sydney in the major semi-final and swept the series, winning game one 4–2 after Matt Kennelly's go-ahead two-run home run in the ninth inning before taking game two 6–0. That ensured they hosted the inaugural ABL Championship Series, where they met the Adelaide Bite. In front of 2,680 fans in game one, which was broadcast nationally on Fox Sports, Adelaide won 4–3 despite allowing 14 hits. The Heat forced the best-of-three series to a deciding game with a 9–1 victory in game two, which came on the back of an eight-run fifth inning, where Ronnie Welty homered twice (a solo home run and then a grand slam) in front of 3,074 spectators. In game three, which was attended by 1,876 people, the Heat scored three in the fifth inning and four in the eighth to secure the title with a 7–1 victory. Import Ben Moore pitched a complete game four-hitter in game three, allowing just one run and striking out 10 without walking an Adelaide batter. Moore was named the MVP of the championship series.

=== 2011–12 season ===
Before the 2011–12 season began, Perth announced they've recruited the previous season's Helms Award winner James McOwen from the Adelaide Bite. They also recruited American utility player Alex Burg, who is a San Francisco Giants minor league player and Brenden Webb, Mychal Givens, Aaron Baker from the Baltimore Orioles system. Brooke Knight returned to the Heat as the Manager of the team.

The Perth Heat began the 2011–12 season with an ABL record-breaking 11–0 November with three consecutive series victories against the Adelaide Bite, Melbourne Aces and Sydney Blue Sox. As Champions of the 2010–11 season, the Perth Heat made the trip to Taiwan to compete in the Asia Series against teams from Japan, Korea and Taiwan. Perth had a lead in two of the three games, ultimately finishing the tournament winless.

Returning to continue their 2011–12 season, the Perth Heat quickly lost their first game of the season against the Canberra Cavalry, 7–0 and then to lose the series 3–1. Perth ended the season winning the final six series' to finish the regular season with a record-breaking 34–11 win–loss record.

Entering the playoffs for the second consecutive season, Perth Heat hosted the Melbourne Aces for a five-game series. After Melbourne took game one 8–7, the Heat won the next three games outscoring Melbourne to a combined score of 21–10 to clinch their second ABL Championship Series berth.

Two weeks later the Melbourne Aces returned to Perth after winning the Preliminary Final Series 3–2 against the Sydney Blue Sox and then began a Championship Series to remember.

Game One of the 2012 ConocoPhillips Australian Baseball League Championship Series saw a Major League matchup with former major league pitcher Virgil Vasquez on the mound for the Perth Heat against Melbourne's starter Travis Blackley (San Francisco Giants). With a classic pitchers' duel in the making, the bottom of the fourth saw James McOwen hit a home run to break the tie and to give the Heat a 2–1 lead. That's all the support Virgil Vasquez needed as he went on to pitching a complete game striking out eight hitters. Perth Heat won game one 4–1.

Game Two went deep into the night with a 13-inning game which saw the Melbourne Aces tie the series at one game each. Behind superb pitching by both teams, it was a matter of clutch hitting to end the game. The bullpens were the highlight of the game with Melbourne's pitching 7.1 shutout innings to Perth's 6.2 innings. Brad Harman singled off Benn Grice in the 13th inning and Melbourne won the 3 hour and 45 minute game 3–2.

Game Three saw Melbourne put on a hitting display scoring six runs through the first three innings of the game. Perth kept the game close scoring four runs of their own which included a three-run home run by catcher Allan de San Miguel. Like game two, the third and final game was a battle of the bullpens. Melbourne relief pitcher Bubbie Buzachero was lights out from the moment he stood on the mound. the likely candidate for the Series MVP kept the Aces in the game with eight innings pitched. Buzachero's bullpen counterpart Jacob Clem pitched 6.1 innings for the Perth Heat. Entering extra innings for the second night in a row, Perth relief pitcher Jack Frawley took the win and help keep the Claxton Shield in Perth pitching four shutout innings with four strikeouts. In the bottom of the 13th inning and Perth's Corey Adamson hitting, Melbourne pitcher Andrew Russell threw a wild pitch that got away from catcher Kevin David which allowed James McOwen to score the winning run to secure Perth Heat's second ABL Championship in as many seasons. Virgil Vasquez was named series MVP for his shutout in game one.

=== 2012–13 season ===
Perth Heat finished the regular season in third position, with a 25-win, 21-loss record. They went on to play Sydney in the preliminary final. Game one was postponed, meaning a doubleheader took place on Saturday. A delayed game one in the series fell Perth's way after a 4–1 victory, with 3 runs scored in the 7th inning which blew the game open in Perth's' favour. Game two was all that was needed for Perth to qualify for another grand final appearance with the Heat prevailing in an 8–6 win. The heat scored all of their runs before the 5th innings, leaving Sydney with a lot of chasing to do which they couldn't quite handle. Perth took on Canberra in the final series, unfortunately for the heat they were beaten in two close matches which saw Canberra win their first title in the new ABL format. Game one final score was 6–4 and game two was 7–6.

=== 2013–14 season ===
The 2013–14 season was extremely successful for the Heat, with an outstanding regular season record of 32–14 they qualified first and earned a spot in the Grand Final series to be played against the winner of the preliminary final series between Sydney and Canberra. Canberra set up a Grand final rematch with Perth by winning the Preliminary series 2–1. With the same final combatants from the 2012–13 season the ABL could rest assured it would be a close series. The Heat had the home-ground advantage this series unlike the previous year. Game one went down to the wire with the Heat prevailing 4–3, putting all the pressure on Canberra. Game two was also close with the heat exacting revenge and atoning for the previous seasons loss. The heat won 2–1 and brought the Claxton shield to Perth.

=== 2014–15 season ===
The Heat finished the regular season with a 28–20 record which saw them finish in second position. Yet again the Heat played Sydney in the preliminary final series. Game one was a close contest with Sydney mounting a four-run comeback, but it wasn't enough as the Heat held on by one run to win 5–4. Game two was disappointing for all Sydney fans as the Heat blew the game wide open and Sydney made four errors in a forgettable night for the Blue Sox. The final score was 9–2 and it saw the Perth Heat qualify for another Grand Final series, this time against ladder leaders the Adelaide Bite. Adelaide got the perfect start against Perth in the series by winning game one and putting Perth on the back foot after a 3–2 win. Game two saw the away team tie up the series and force a deciding game with the final score being 5–3. Game three was an exciting game with 17 runs being scored overall. The game was a home run fest, with 5 homers being hit. Luke Hughes, Tim Kennelly and Tim Smith hit the home runs for Perth, while Mitch Dening and Craig Maddox hit them for Adelaide. In the end the game was a blowout with Perth winning a successive ABL title and returning the Claxton Shield to Perth with as 12–5 win.

=== 2015–16 season ===
In Manager Kevin Boles' final season at the helm, the defending champion Heat went 23–33 to finish in fifth position and miss the playoffs.

On the mound, import pitcher Edwin Carl led the league with 85 strikeouts.

Offensively, the Heat hit a league-low .223 whilst scoring just 214 runs across the 56-game season.

=== 2016–17 season ===
The 2016–17 season saw the ABL shift to a 40-game season, as opposed to a 56-game season. The season was the Heat's worst since the rebirth of the ABL in 2010/11. The Heat posted a 14–26 record to finish in sixth position.

Led by first-year Manager Matt Kennelly, Perth struggled for consistency and missed out on the playoffs.

Despite strong offensive seasons from Luke Hughes and Tim Kennelly who combined for 12 home runs and 32 RBIs, Perth scored a league-low 158 runs across the year.

=== 2017–18 season ===
After two years of missing out on postseason action, the Heat made their return to playoff baseball in 2017–18. Following the appointment of new Manager Andy Kyle, who replaced Matt Kennelly, the Heat compiled a 26–14 record to finish second in the ABL standings behind the Brisbane Bandits.

Led by Tampa Bay Rays prospects and future major leaguers Jake Fraley and Mike Brosseau, alongside local young-guns Jess Williams and Robbie Glendinning, the Heat re-established themselves as a powerhouse of Australian baseball.

The Heat's return to playoff baseball saw them square off against the Canberra Cavalry in the 2017–18 ABL semi-finals. After claiming a tense 6–3 win in Game One – a game where MLB pitcher Warwick Saupold recorded the hold and Cameron Lamb the save.

An injury to Brosseau and the absence of catcher Zac Law and Fraley would end up costing the Heat, however, as they dropped Games Two and Three to end their season.

Fraley would go on to be named the league's Helms Award winner after breaking the league's stolen base record with 39 stolen bases. The outfielder also hit 13 home runs, 39 RBIs and scored 50 runs, while teammate Williams won Rookie of the Year. The league's Relief Pitcher of the Year was awarded to Cameron Lamb.

Off the diamond, Perth's Baseball Park in Thornlie was renamed the Perth Harley-Davidson Ballpark after securing a partnership with Perth Harley-Davidson.

=== 2018–19 season ===
The 2018–19 season saw the Heat win the inaugural South-West Division and return to the ABL Championship Series for the first time since 2014–15. Despite losing star first baseman Luke Hughes to the Melbourne Aces, the Heat opened the season with an impressive 4–0 series sweep of newly formed expansion side, the Auckland Tuatara.

The Heat went on to finish with a 24–16 record – good enough to pip the Aces to the South-West crown and return to the playoffs for a second consecutive year.

Led by the signing of former World Series Champion Pete Kozma, the Heat scored a league-high 289 runs across the 40-game season, while hitting 51 home runs.

Despite dropping Game One of their semi-final series to the Sydney Blue Sox 7–0, the Heat rallied to take Game Two by a scoreline of 3–1 in a tight ballgame. With their season on the line, the Heat then produced a solid offensive performance to defeat the Blue Sox 11–6 in the deciding Game Three and book their spot in the ABL Championship Series.

The Heat lost the Championship Series 2–0 against the Brisbane Bandits – the Bandits' fourth consecutive ABL title.

Heat outfielder Tim Kennelly was named the recipient of the Helms Award, while Robbie Glendinning won the league's Rookie of the Year.

Off the field, all ABL teams became privately owned with the Heat purchased by a private consortium headed by WA businessmen and former childcare centre boss Rory Vassallo, experienced broadcaster Christian Galopolous and America's Cup winner Eileen 'Red' Bond.

=== 2019–20 season ===
On 1 August 2019, it was announced that former manager Brooke Knight would return to for the 2019–20 Australian Baseball League season, replacing Andy Kyle. On the same day it was announced Kyle would remain at the Heat as an assistant coach alongside former Perth pitcher Tyler Anderson and Kevin Hooker.

Perth opened their 2019–20 season away against the Auckland Tuatara on 22 November 2019. They reached the Wild Card game as the 5th seed, falling to the Canberra Cavalry 5–4.

== See also ==
- Sport in Australia
- Australian Baseball
- Australian Baseball League (1989–99)
- List of current Australian Baseball League team rosters
