= 2025–26 Australian Baseball League season =

Sports tournament

- League: Australian Baseball League
- Sport: Baseball
- Duration: 13 November 2025 – 25 January 2026
- Games: 80
- Teams: 4

Regular season
- Season MVP: Eric Rataczak

Postseason
- Venue: Blacktown Baseball Stadium
- Champions: Adelaide Giants
- Runners-up: Sydney Blue Sox
- Finals MVP: Devin Saltiban

Seasons
- ← 2024–25 2026–27 →

The 2025–26 Australian Baseball League season was the fifteenth season of the Australian Baseball League (ABL), and began on 13 November 2025. The four-team competition is the premier English speaking winter baseball league with players affiliated with Major League Baseball, Nippon Professional Baseball, KBO League, Chinese Professional Baseball League, and various independent baseball leagues.

== Teams ==
This is the second time the league has retracted following a reduction in the 2023–24 Australian Baseball League season. The Canberra Cavalry had their license agreement terminated due to financial uncertainty from owners Paul Kelly and Adrian Dart. In addition, the Melbourne Aces withdrew their participation citing financial and management issues with the League.

Teams in the ABL
Team	State/Territory	Stadium
Adelaide Giants	South Australia	Dicolor Australia Stadium
Brisbane Bandits	Queensland	Viticon Stadium
Perth Heat	Western Australia	Empire Ballpark
Sydney Blue Sox	New South Wales	Blue Sox Stadium

== Regular season ==
The regular season began on 13 November 2025 and is scheduled to end on 18 January 2026. Each team was scheduled to play 39 games across 10 rounds of four-game series, with the exception of series beginning Boxing Day which will was three games. The final game of the season between Brisbane and Sydney was cancelled due to inclement weather.

=== Standings ===
Key
Secured postseason berth

Pos	Team	W	L	Pct.	GB
1	Sydney Blue Sox	24	14	.632	—
2	Adelaide Giants	19	20	.487	5.5
3	Perth Heat	18	21	.462	6.5
4	Brisbane Bandits	16	22	.421	8.0

=== Statistical leaders ===
Batting leaders
Stat	Player (Note: Minimum 2.7 PAs per team game.)	Team	Total
AVG	Nick Ward	Adelaide Giants	.354
HR	Robbie Perkins	Brisbane Bandits	10
RBI	Devin Saltiban	Adelaide Giants	29
R	Pablo Nunez	Sydney Blue Sox	30
H	Nick Ward	Adelaide Giants	52
SB	Devin Saltiban	Adelaide Giants	9

Pitching leaders
Stat	Player (Note: Minimum 0.8 IP per team game.)	Team	Total
W	Landen Bourassa	Sydney Blue Sox	6
ERA	Gary Grosjean	Perth Heat	1.69
K	Jack O'Loughlin	Sydney Blue Sox	62
IP	Landen Bourassa	Sydney Blue Sox	62 1/3
SV	Tyler Jeans	Brisbane Bandits	7

== Championship Series ==
The best-of-three Championship Series began 23 January 2026 and finished 25 January 2026, between the top two teams from the regular season. The Sydney Blue Sox finished the regular season 24-14, securing a home Championship Series and their second consecutive minor premiership with six games left in the regular season.

It was the first time a New South Wales team has competed for the Claxton Shield in a final since the 2009 Claxton Shield when the New South Wales Patriots lost to the Perth Heat. New South Wales last won the title in the 2005 Claxton Shield with a lineup that included Major Leaguers Trent Oeltjen, Glenn Williams, Ryan Rowland-Smith, and Chris Oxspring.

The Adelaide Giants secured their spot for a return to the Championship Series after losing in the first round of the playoffs the previous season. They would come away successful with their third championship in four seasons.

In game one, Jack O'Loughlin would pitch seven innings of two hit baseball, one of which being a bloop double down the rightfield line that scored two runners who had reached on walk and hit by pitch. O'Loughlin would retire the next 16 hitters before eventually a walk-off home-run in the 9th inning from catcher Mitch Edwards secured a 3-2 victory for the home team playing in Sydney.

Game two was a dominant Sydney pitching performance from former MLB and now KBO pitcher Alex Wells, who gave up one run over seven innings. Adelaide however, bounced back in game three with a strong start from Perth born lefty Josh Hendrickson and scoreless outings from their bullpen, eventually winning the decider 6-2.

Philadelphia Phillies farmhand and third round pick Devin Saltiban was named the series MVP, with an OPS of .930 across the series including solid defensive play in centerfield.

23 January 2026; 19:00 (UTC+10:00); Game 1	Sydney Blue Sox	2-3	Adelaide Giants	(New South Wales) Blacktown Baseball Stadium, Sydney; Attendance: 1,212; Umpires: HP: Tom West. 1B: Trent Thomas. 2B: Paul Latta. 3B: Ben Nash.
23 January 2026; 19:00 (UTC+10:00); Game 1	WP: Ky Hampton (1-0)	Boxscore	LP: Ben Ferrer (0-1)	(New South Wales) Blacktown Baseball Stadium, Sydney; Attendance: 1,212; Umpires: HP: Tom West. 1B: Trent Thomas. 2B: Paul Latta. 3B: Ben Nash.
23 January 2026; 19:00 (UTC+10:00); Game 1		Boxscore	HR: Devin Saltiban (1), Mitch Edwards (1)	(New South Wales) Blacktown Baseball Stadium, Sydney; Attendance: 1,212; Umpires: HP: Tom West. 1B: Trent Thomas. 2B: Paul Latta. 3B: Ben Nash.

24 January 2026; 19:00 (UTC+10:00); Game 2	Adelaide Giants	1-6	Sydney Blue Sox	(New South Wales) Blacktown Baseball Stadium, Sydney; Attendance: 1,842; Umpires: HP: Trent Thomas 1B: Paul Latta. 2B: Ben Nash. 3B: Tom West
24 January 2026; 19:00 (UTC+10:00); Game 2	LP: Giussepe Velasquez (0-1)	Boxscore	WP: Alex Wells (1-0)	(New South Wales) Blacktown Baseball Stadium, Sydney; Attendance: 1,842; Umpires: HP: Trent Thomas 1B: Paul Latta. 2B: Ben Nash. 3B: Tom West

25 January 2026; 18:00 (UTC+10:00); Game 3	Adelaide Giants	6-2	Sydney Blue Sox	(New South Wales) Blacktown Baseball Stadium, Sydney; Attendance: 1,531; Umpires: HP: Paul Latta. 1B: Ben Nash. 2B: Tom West. 3B: Trent Thomas.
25 January 2026; 18:00 (UTC+10:00); Game 3	WP: Josh Hendrickson (1-0)	Boxscore	LP: Ben Ferrer (0-2)	(New South Wales) Blacktown Baseball Stadium, Sydney; Attendance: 1,531; Umpires: HP: Paul Latta. 1B: Ben Nash. 2B: Tom West. 3B: Trent Thomas.
