= Jon Berti =

American baseball player (born 1990)

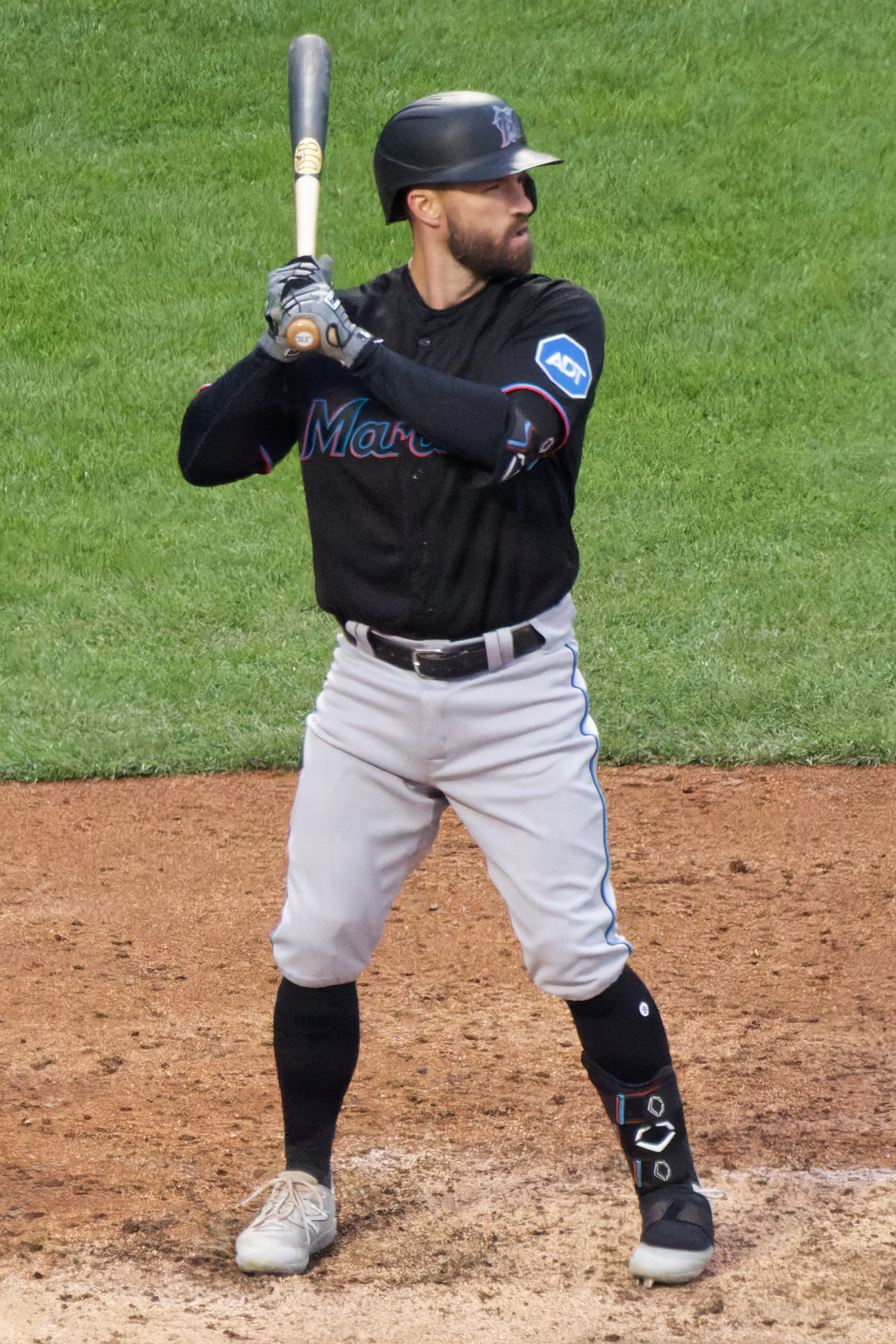
- Berti with the Miami Marlins in 2023
- Utility player
- Born: January 22, 1990 (age 36); Troy, Michigan, U.S.
- Batted: Right Threw: Right

MLB debut
- September 26, 2018, for the Toronto Blue Jays

Last MLB appearance
- August 10, 2025, for the Chicago Cubs

MLB statistics
- Batting average: .256
- Home runs: 24
- Runs batted in: 128
- Stolen bases: 108
- Stats at Baseball Reference

Teams
- Toronto Blue Jays (2018); Miami Marlins (2019–2023); New York Yankees (2024); Chicago Cubs (2025)

Career highlights and awards
- MLB stolen base leader (2022)

Jonathon David Berti (born January 22, 1990) is an American former professional baseball utility player. He played in Major League Baseball (MLB) for the Toronto Blue Jays, Miami Marlins, New York Yankees, and Chicago Cubs from 2018 to 2025.

Berti played college baseball at Bowling Green State University. He was selected by the Blue Jays in the 18th round of the 2011 MLB draft, and made his MLB debut in 2018. He led MLB in stolen bases in 2022.

== Amateur career ==
Berti attended Troy High School in Troy, Michigan, where he played for the school's baseball team. The Oakland Athletics selected Berti in the 36th round of the 2008 Major League Baseball draft, but he did not sign.

Berti enrolled at Bowling Green State University, where he played college baseball for the Bowling Green Falcons baseball team. Berti set Falcons' single-season records with a .423 batting average, 93 hits, and tied the single-season record with six triples. His 17 career triples were also a record. In 2010, he played collegiate summer baseball with the Brewster Whitecaps of the Cape Cod Baseball League.

== Professional career ==
=== Toronto Blue Jays ===
==== Minor leagues ====
The Toronto Blue Jays selected Berti in the 18th round, with the 559th overall selection, of the 2011 Major League Baseball draft. With the Vancouver Canadians of the Low-A Northwest League, he had 23 stolen bases, and hit .291 with 21 RBI. In 2012, he played for the Lansing Lugnuts of the Single–A Midwest League and the Dunedin Blue Jays of the High-A Florida State League (FSL). In 110 combined games, Berti hit .241 with 2 home runs, 40 RBI, and 34 stolen bases. In 2013, Berti played for Dunedin and stole 56 bases, the most in the FSL. That offseason, Berti played for the Canberra Cavalry of the Australian Baseball League (ABL) in the 2013–14 ABL season. He stole 31 bases in 46 games, setting an ABL record, and hit .309 with 18 RBI. He stole another four bases in the 2013 Asia Series.

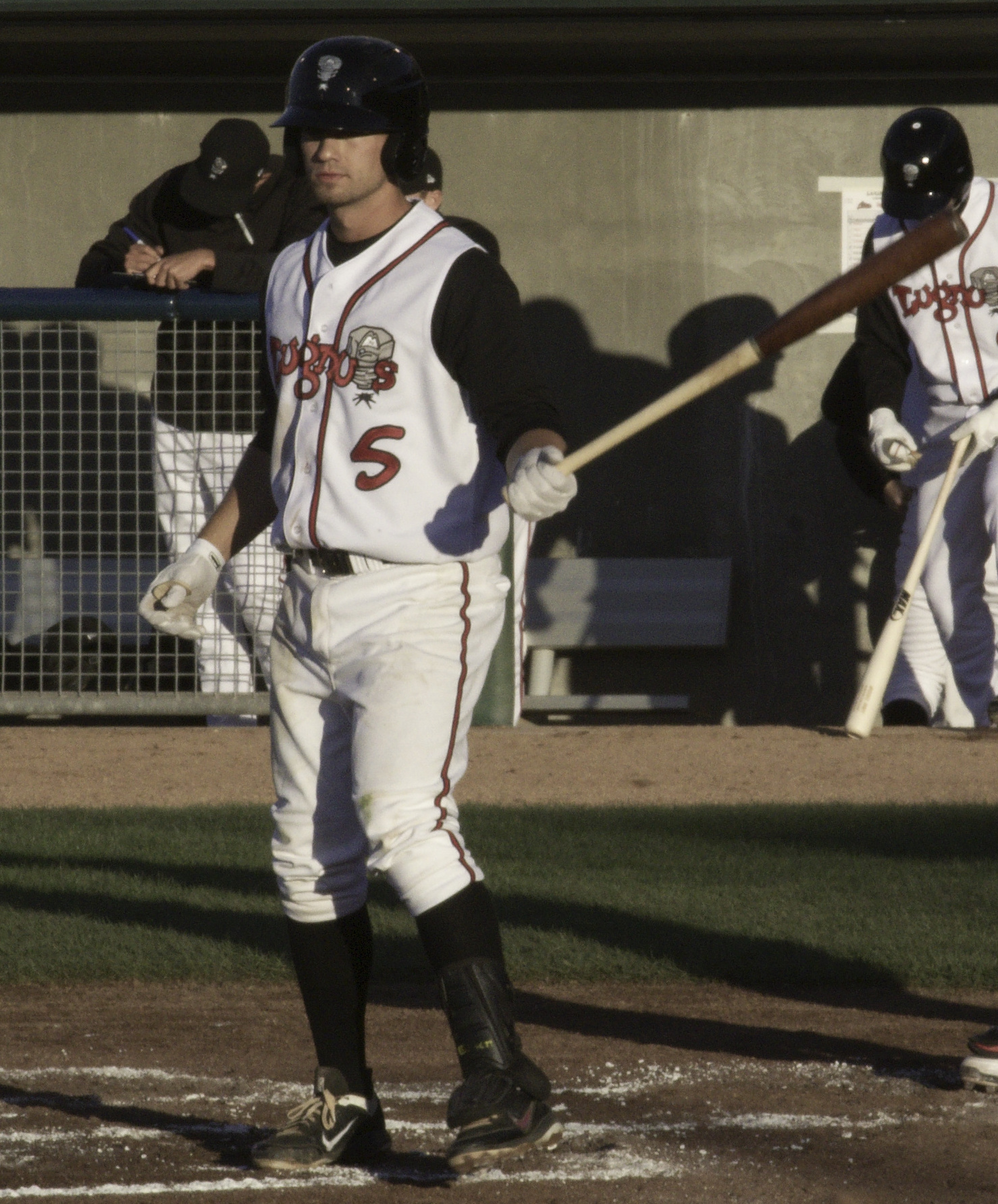
Berti with the Lansing Lugnuts in 2012

In 2014, Berti played for the New Hampshire Fisher Cats of the Double-A Eastern League. He stole 38 bases, was named an Eastern League All Star, and was assigned to the Arizona Fall League after the regular season. He also set career-highs in games played (136), home runs (7), and RBI (50). In the offseason, Berti played 20 games with the Mesa Solar Sox of the Arizona Fall League, and batted .292 with three home runs, eight RBIs, and six stolen bases. He would split time in 2015 with New Hampshire and the Triple-A Buffalo Bisons. In 103 total games, he hit .249 with three home runs, 34 RBIs, and 23 stolen bases.

The Blue Jays invited Berti to spring training in 2016, where he was reassigned to minor league camp on March 10. He started the season with New Hampshire, and was assigned to Buffalo on April 27. Berti played in 86 total games in 2016, and hit .256 with four home runs, 33 RBI, and 36 stolen bases. He spent 2017 with Buffalo and Dunedin, hitting .204 with three home runs, 20 RBI, and 24 stolen bases in 65 games. Berti elected free agency following the season on November 6, 2017. On January 12, 2018, he re–signed with Toronto on a minor league contract.

=== Cleveland Indians ===
On April 21, 2018, Berti was traded to the Cleveland Indians organization in exchange for cash considerations. He appeared in 25 games for the Triple-A Columbus Clippers, hitting .217/.333/.233 with 3 home runs and 8 RBI.

=== Toronto Blue Jays (second stint) ===
On June 8, 2018, Berti was traded back to the Toronto Blue Jays organization.

==== Major leagues ====
The Blue Jays promoted Berti to the major leagues for the first time on September 26, 2018, and inserted him in their starting lineup that day at second base. He was designated for assignment on October 5, and outrighted to Triple-A Buffalo on October 9. Berti elected free agency following the season on November 2.

=== Miami Marlins ===
On December 3, 2018, Berti signed a minor league contract with the Miami Marlins, and was invited to spring training. He opened the 2019 season with the New Orleans Baby Cakes.

On April 20, 2019, the Marlins promoted Berti to their major league roster. In 2019, Berti hit .273 with 6 home runs, and led the Marlins with 17 stolen bases in 73 games. He also demonstrated his defensive versatility as a rookie with 20 games played as a third baseman, 21 games as a center fielder and 32 games as a shortstop. Berti became the first player in Marlins history with 20-plus games at each of those positions in the same season.

Berti stole second base, third base and home in the sixth inning of a Marlins' game against the New York Mets in August 2020, becoming the first Miami player to steal three bases in an inning. On the season, Berti slashed .258/.388/.350 with two home runs and 14 RBI in 120 at-bats.

In 2021 with Miami he batted .210/.311/.313 with four home runs and 19 RBIs in 271 plate appearances.

On March 22, 2022, Berti signed a $1.2 million contract with the Marlins, avoiding salary arbitration. For the 2022 season, Berti led the major leagues in stolen bases with 41 (while being caught five times). He batted .240/.324/.338 in 358 at bats with 47 runs, four home runs, and 28 RBI. He had the fastest sprint speed of all major league second basemen, at 29.6 feet/second. Berti was the only player to reach the 40–stolen base plateau in 2022, doing so in 102 games; no player in MLB history had led the majors in stolen bases in a full season with fewer games played.

Before the 2023 season, the Marlins signed Berti to a one-year contract worth $2.125 million with a team option for the 2024 season. He batted .294 with seven home runs, 33 RBI and 16 stolen bases while being caught six times. After the season, the Marlins exercised a $3.625 million for the 2024 season.

=== New York Yankees ===
On March 27, 2024, the Marlins traded Berti to the New York Yankees in a three-team trade in which the Marlins received John Cruz from the Yankees and Shane Sasaki from the Tampa Bay Rays, and the Rays received Ben Rortvedt from the Yankees. After hitting .273 in 17 games, Berti suffered a strained left calf and was placed on the injured list in May 25. He was transferred to the 60–day injured list on June 12. Berti was activated on September 9. In 25 total games for the Yankees, he slashed .273/.342/.318 with one home run, six RBI, and five stolen bases.

In the second game of the 2024 American League Division Series against the Kansas City Royals, Berti started at first base for the first time in his career. It was just the fifth time that a player made his first career start at a fielding position (excluding pitcher and designated hitter) in postseason play. On November 22, the Yankees non–tendered Berti, making him a free agent.

=== Chicago Cubs ===
On January 28, 2025, Berti signed a one-year, $2 million contract with the Chicago Cubs. On July 4, Berti pitched the ninth inning of a game against the St. Louis Cardinals. Berti allowed two runs, giving up three walks and two hits, as the Cubs won 11–3. In 51 appearances for Chicago, he batted .210/.262/.230 with two RBI and 11 stolen bases. Berti was designated for assignment by the Cubs on August 12. He was released by Chicago after clearing waivers the following day.

On August 20, 2026, Berti announced his retirement from professional baseball.

== Personal life ==
Berti's father, Thomas, played in minor league baseball with the Detroit Tigers organization. He is of Italian descent.
