= Michael Collins (baseball) =

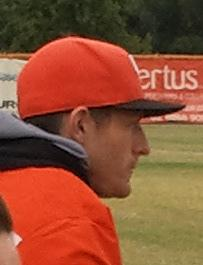
- Collins with the Canberra Cavalry in 2013
- Catcher / Coach / Manager
- Born: 18 July 1984 (age 42); Canberra, Australia
- Bats: left Throws: right
- Stats at Baseball Reference

Teams
- Coach: Houston Astros (2019–2025)

Career highlights and awards
- World Series champion (2022)

Michael John Donald Collins (born 18 July 1984) is an Australian-American baseball manager, coach, and former player in the Australian Baseball League (ABL). He is the former catching coach for the Houston Astros of Major League Baseball (MLB). He has also played and coached for the Australian national team in World Baseball Classic (WBC) tournaments.

As manager of the Canberra Cavalry in the 2012–13 season, he led the team to win the Claxton Shield as ABL champions, and in 2013, champions of the Asia Series.

== Early life ==
Collins attended the Australian Capital Territory Academy of Sports, an institution established to train future Australian Olympians.

== Playing career ==
Collins debuted in the minor leagues in 2001 at the age of 16 with the AZL Angels. In the 2002 Claxton Shield, the Canberra native played for the Australian Provincial team. In 2002, the teenager hit .275 on his return trip, alternating between catcher, first base, and DH. In 2003 in the US, Collins batted .333 for the Provo Angels and .368 for the AZL Angels.

In his 2004 campaign, Collins struggled, hitting .218 in only 13 games for the Cedar Rapids Kernels. In 2005, Michael hit .444, third-best in the Claxton Shield, and was named the All-Star catcher. Collins fared better in his second year at Cedar Rapids, producing at a .320/.412/.482 clip with 16 steals and 32 doubles while splitting time between catcher (59 games) and first base (40). He finished third in the Midwest League in batting average and made the league All-Star team at catcher.

In the 2006 Shield, Collins hit .438/.538/.700 in five games. Due to his Claxton Shield performance, he was added to the Australia national baseball team for the 2006 World Baseball Classic. Collins was 0 for 4 in the event.

Collins hit .291 for the 2006 Rancho Cucamonga Quakes and was promoted to Arkansas Travelers in 2007. He last played for the Portland Beavers of the AAA Pacific Coast League.

In Claxton Shield 2009, Australia Provincial was cut from the competition, and Collins was "adopted" into the Queensland Rams, where in 6 games he hit 5 home-runs and, if qualified, would have led the team in slugging with .957.

In 2010–11 and 2011–12, Collins played for the Canberra Cavalry, in the newly established Australian Baseball League (ABL). He ended his playing career on 22 January 2012, hitting .303 in 48 career games for the Cavalry.

== Coaching career ==
Prior to the 2012–13 ABL season, Collins retired from playing and was named the team's manager. The Cavalry went on to win the 2012–13 season and were awarded the Claxton Shield as national champions for the first time. Collins returned as coach in 2013–14, and in November 2013, took the club to the Asia Series in Taiwan where the team won the championship.

=== San Diego Padres organization ===
Collins worked in the San Diego Padres organization in Minor League Baseball as a manager between 2012 and 2017, leading the DSL Padres, AZL Padres, Fort Wayne TinCaps and Lake Elsinore Storm.

He has coached for the Australian national team, including in the 2013 and 2017 World Baseball Classics.

=== Houston Astros ===
Collins was hired by the Houston Astros as a bullpen catcher prior to the 2018 season, and took the role as catching coach in 2019. For the 2020 season, Collins changed his uniform number to 17, making him the first Astros player or coach to wear the number since Lance Berkman left the team in 2010. In 2022, the Astros won 106 games, the second-highest total in franchise history. They advanced to the World Series and defeated the Philadelphia Phillies in six games to give Collins his first career World Series title.

=== New York Mets organization ===
In 2026, Collins was named as manager of the Binghamton Rumble Ponies the Double-A affiliate of the New York Mets.

== Personal life ==
On May 3, 2024, Collins became a United States citizen after passing the prerequisite civics test.

== See also ==
- Baseball in Australia

Sporting positions
Preceded by Position established	Houston Astros catching coach 2019—2025	Succeeded by Tim Cossins
