= 2024–25 Australian Baseball League season =

Sports tournament

- League: Australian Baseball League
- Sport: Baseball
- Duration: 15 November 2024 – 1 February 2025
- Teams: 6

Regular season
- Season MVP: Alexander Wells

Postseason
- Champions: Canberra Cavalry
- Runners-up: Perth Heat
- Finals MVP: Colten Davis

Seasons
- ← 2023–24 2025–26 →

The 2024–25 Australian Baseball League season was the fourteenth season of the Australian Baseball League (ABL), and began on 15 November 2024. The six-team competition is the premier English speaking winter baseball league with players affiliated with Major League Baseball, Nippon Professional Baseball, KBO League, Chinese Professional Baseball League, and various independent baseball leagues.

The Canberra Cavalry won their second championship, beating the Perth Heat two games to nil in a best-of-three Championship Series. It is Canberra's first championship since the 2011–12 Australian Baseball League season.

== Teams ==
Teams in the ABL
Team	State/Territory	Stadium
Adelaide Giants	South Australia	Dicolor Australia Stadium
Brisbane Bandits	Queensland	Viticon Stadium
Canberra Cavalry	Australian Capital Territory	Narrabundah Ballpark
Melbourne Aces	Victoria	Melbourne Ballpark
Perth Heat	Western Australia	Empire Ballpark
Sydney Blue Sox	New South Wales	Blue Sox Stadium

== Regular season ==
The regular season began on 15 November 2024 and is scheduled to end on 19 January 2025. Each team will play 40 games (20 home and 20 away) across 10 rounds and will face every other team twice (once at home and once away) in four-game series.

The round two matchup between Brisbane and Melbourne in Brisbane was reduced to three games due to rain and fourth game rescheduled to round seven between the teams in Melbourne. The round three matchup between Sydney and Melbourne in Sydney was reduced to three games due to rain and the fourth game rescheduled to round nine between the teams in Melbourne.

The regular season placings and playoff qualification came down to the final day of the season, with four teams able to lay claim to the final two spots. Perth secured their own fate by toppling Sydney, meanwhile Canberra knocked out Brisbane in their matchup, but required a loss from Melbourne against Adelaide to tie in the standings qualify on the subsequent head-to-head tiebreaker. Melbourne who only needed a win to secure the final playoff spot gave up six runs in the ninth inning to drop their final game 9–7, ending their season.

=== Standings ===
Key
Secured postseason berth

Pos	Team	W	L	Pct.	GB
1	Sydney Blue Sox	24	16	.600	—
2	Adelaide Giants	23	17	.575	1.0
3	Perth Heat	20	20	.500	4.0
4	Canberra Cavalry	18	22	.450	6.0 (Note: Canberra held the head-to-head tiebreaker over Melbourne 5–3)
5	Melbourne Aces	18	22	.450	6.0
6	Brisbane Bandits	17	23	.425	7.0

=== Statistical leaders ===
Batting leaders
Stat	Player (Note: Minimum 2.7 PAs per team game.)	Team	Total
AVG	Jarryd Dale	Melbourne Aces	.381
HR	Brennon McNair	Brisbane Bandits	11
RBI	Greg Bird	Melbourne Aces	27
R	Aaron Whitefield	Melbourne Aces	37
H	Aaron Whitefield	Melbourne Aces	49
SB	Jake Mackenzie	Sydney Blue Sox	15

Pitching leaders
Stat	Player (Note: Minimum 0.8 IP per team game.)	Team	Total
W	Alex Wells; James Bradwell	Sydney Blue Sox; Adelaide Giants	6
L	Carlos Calderon	Canberra Cavalry	6
ERA	Alex Wells	Sydney Blue Sox	1.55
K	Lachlan Wells	Adelaide Giants	66
IP	Jack Mahoney	Canberra Cavalry	58 2/3
SV	Tyler Beardsley	Perth Heat	10

== Postseason ==
The postseason is scheduled to begin 24 January 2025, with four teams making the playoffs. All postseason series will use a best-of-three format, with the first-placed Sydney Blue Sox hosting the fourth-placed Canberra Cavalry and the second-placed Adelaide Giants hosting the third-placed Perth Heat. The winners of the semi-finals will compete for the Claxton Shield, beginning on 31 January 2025.

=== Postseason bracket ===
Semi-Final Series; January 24–25
1	Sydney Blue Sox	2	2
4	Canberra Cavalry	3	5
2	Adelaide Giants	1	3
3	Perth Heat	2	5

Championship Series; January 31–February 1
4	Canberra Cavalry	10	5
3	Perth Heat	8	0

=== Championship Series: Canberra Cavalry v Perth Heat ===
Canberra Cavalry and Perth Heat played a best-of-three final, the first time the Championship Series did not feature one of the top two seeds. All three games were hosted in Perth at Empire Ballpark due to logistical reasons, but Canberra remained the home team for game one with Perth to be the home team in games two and three.

Canberra and Perth faced each other in back-to-back finals in 2013 and 2014, winning a Claxton Shield title each.

Despite being the lower seed in both the semi-final and championship series, Canberra swept the series 2-0. Indy-ball pitcher Colten Davis of the American Association won Championship MVP after pitching 8 2/3 scoreless innings in game two.

31 January 2025; 19:00 (UTC+08:00); Game 1	Canberra Cavalry	10-8	Perth Heat	(Western Australia) Empire Ballpark, Perth; Attendance: 2,394; Umpires: HP: Ben Nash. 1B: Paul Latta. 2B: Tom West. 3B: Ryan Harder.
31 January 2025; 19:00 (UTC+08:00); Game 1	WP: Jack Mahoney (1-0)	Boxscore	LP: Dariel Fregio (0-1)	(Western Australia) Empire Ballpark, Perth; Attendance: 2,394; Umpires: HP: Ben Nash. 1B: Paul Latta. 2B: Tom West. 3B: Ryan Harder.
31 January 2025; 19:00 (UTC+08:00); Game 1	HR: George Callil (1)	Boxscore	HR: Tim Kennelly 2 (2), Jhon Diaz (2)	(Western Australia) Empire Ballpark, Perth; Attendance: 2,394; Umpires: HP: Ben Nash. 1B: Paul Latta. 2B: Tom West. 3B: Ryan Harder.

01 February 2025; 19:00 (UTC+08:00); Game 2	Perth Heat	0-5	Canberra Cavalry	(Western Australia) Empire Ballpark, Perth; Attendance: 3,056; Umpires: HP: Paul Latta. 1B: Tom West. 2B: Ryan Harder. 3B: Ben Nash.
01 February 2025; 19:00 (UTC+08:00); Game 2	LP: Jong-Hae Won (0-1)	Boxscore	WP: Colten Davis (2-0)	(Western Australia) Empire Ballpark, Perth; Attendance: 3,056; Umpires: HP: Paul Latta. 1B: Tom West. 2B: Ryan Harder. 3B: Ben Nash.
01 February 2025; 19:00 (UTC+08:00); Game 2		Boxscore	HR: Miles Simington (1)	(Western Australia) Empire Ballpark, Perth; Attendance: 3,056; Umpires: HP: Paul Latta. 1B: Tom West. 2B: Ryan Harder. 3B: Ben Nash.
