= Kyōsuke Mashiko =

Japanese baseball player (born 2000)

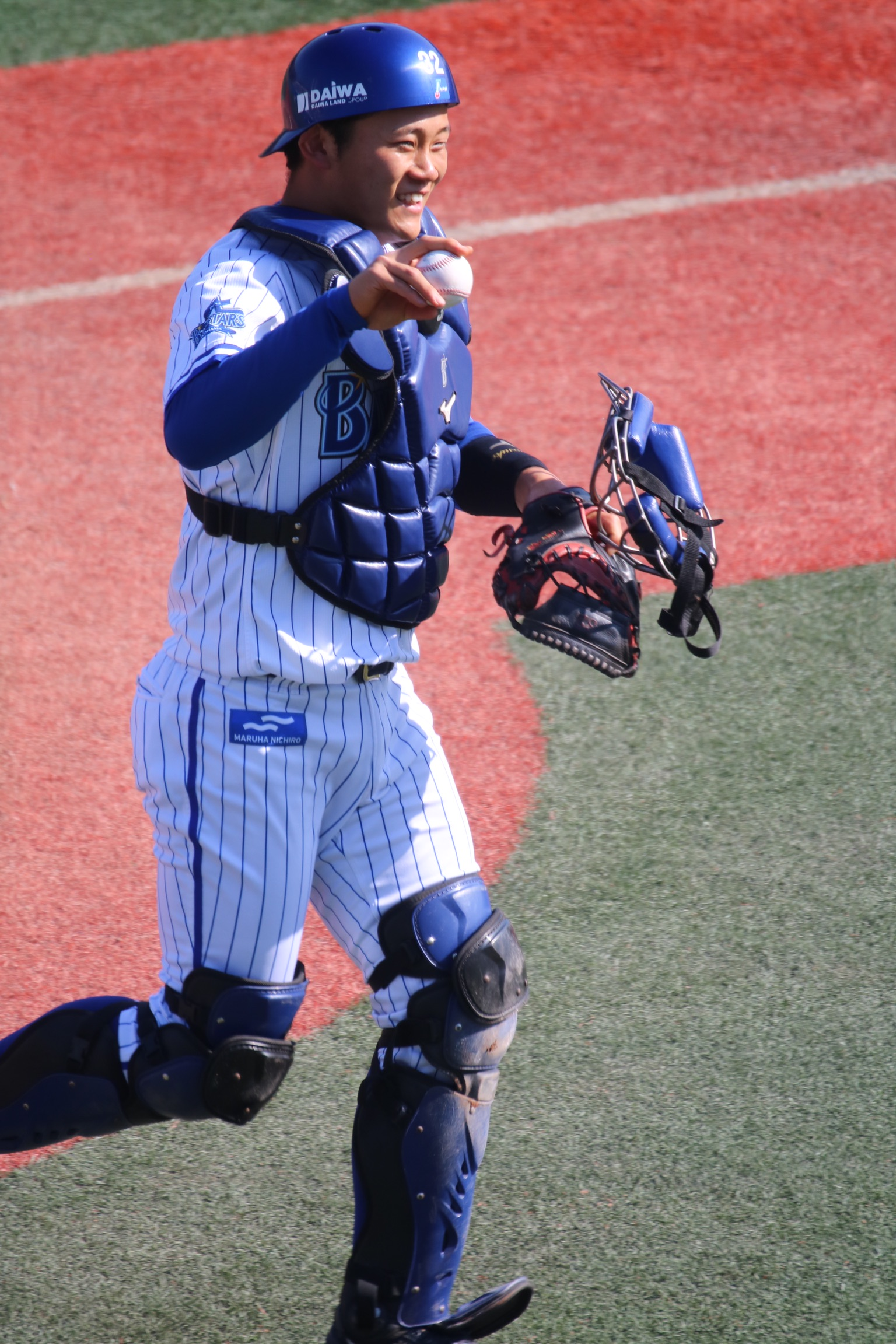
- Mashiko with the Yokohama DeNA BayStars

Yokohama DeNA BayStars – No. 32
- Catcher
- Born: December 27, 2000 (age 25); Utsunomiya, Tochigi, Japan
- Bats: Right Throws: Right

Professional debut
- NPB: October 23, 2021, for the Yokohama DeNA BayStars
- ABL: November 13, 2025, for the Brisbane Bandits

NPB statistics (through August 22, 2026)
- Batting average: .167
- Hits: 1
- Stats at Baseball Reference

Teams
- Yokohama DeNA BayStars (2019–present); Brisbane Bandits (2025–26)

Career highlights and awards
- Japan Series champion (2024)

Kyōsuke Mashiko (益子京右, Mashiko Kyoright; born December 27, 2000) is a Japanese professional baseball player. He is a catcher for the Yokohama DeNA BayStars of Nippon Professional Baseball (NPB). Mashiko also played for the Brisbane Bandits of the Australian Baseball League (ABL).

== Career ==
=== Yokohama DeNA BayStars ===
Mashiko was selected by Yokohama DeNA BayStars in the fifth round of the 2018 NPB draft. He made his Nippon Professional Baseball (NPB) debut on October 23, 2021.

=== Brisbane Bandits ===
On October 9, 2025, Mashiko was assigned to the Brisbane Bandits of the Australian Baseball League (ABL). In 95 appearances he batted .274/.400/.379 with one home run, seven RBI and three stolen bases.
