= Tomoya Mikami =

Japanese baseball player

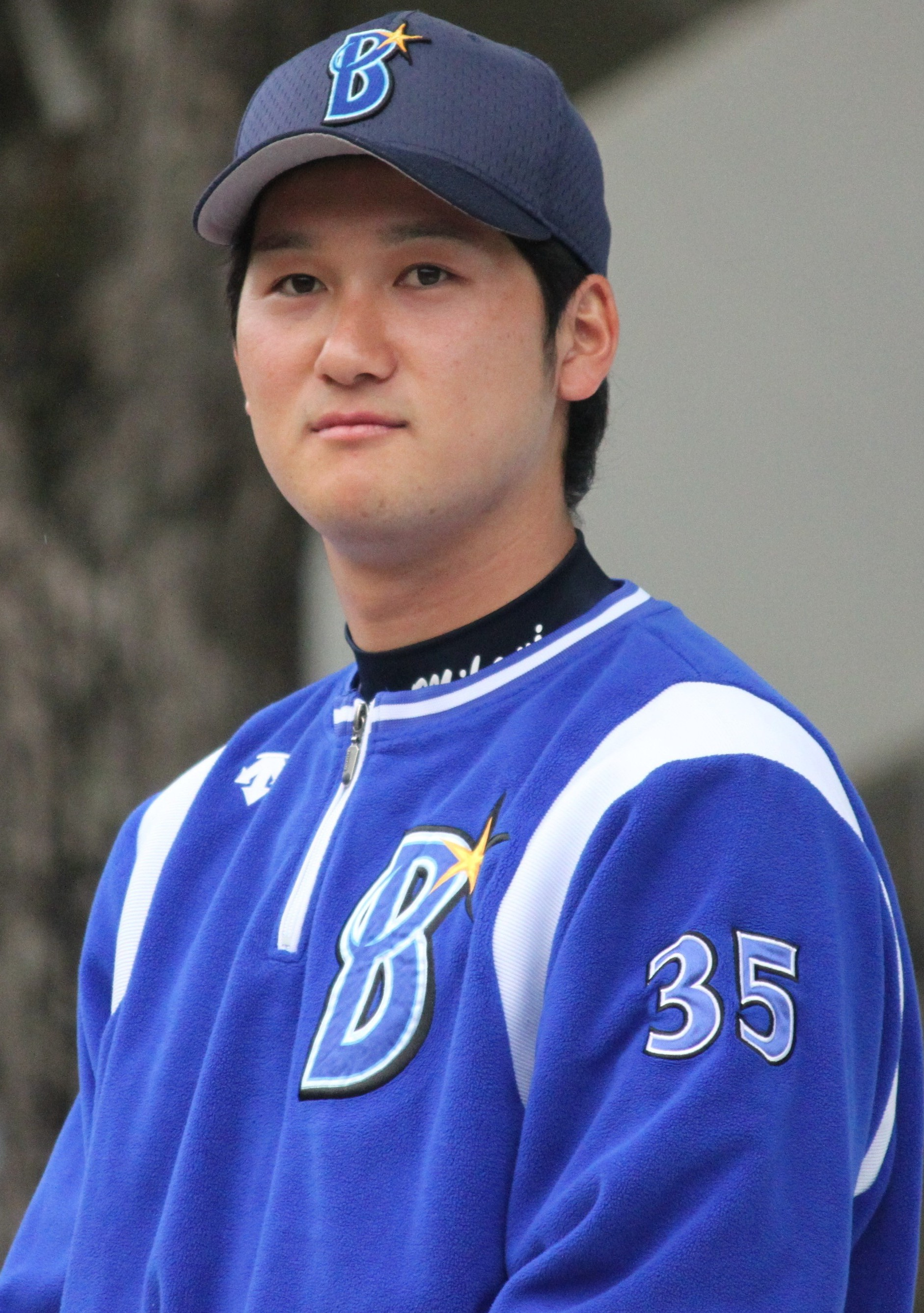
- Mikami with the Yokohama DeNA BayStars

Oisix Niigata Albirex – No. 17
- Pitcher
- Born: April 10, 1989 (age 37); Tajimi, Gifu, Japan
- Bats: Right Throws: Right

NPB debut
- March 28, 2014, for the Yokohama DeNA BayStars

Career statistics (through 2022 season)
- Win–loss record: 10–15
- Earned Run Average: 3.15
- Strikeouts: 248
- Saves: 23
- Holds: 114
- Stats at Baseball Reference

Teams
- Yokohama DeNA BayStars (2014–2022); Yomiuri Giants (2023)

Career highlights and awards
- 2× NPB All-Star (2014, 2016)

Tomoya Mikami (三上 朋也, Mikami Tomoya; born April 10, 1989 in Tajimi, Gifu, Japan) is a professional Japanese baseball player. He plays pitcher for the Oisix Niigata Albirex.

== Career ==
Mikami signed with the Canberra Cavalry of the Australian Baseball League to play weeks 3-10 of the 2018/19 ABL season.

On February 27, 2019, he was selected for Japan national baseball team at the 2019 exhibition games against Mexico.
