= Steve Schrenk =

American baseball player & coach

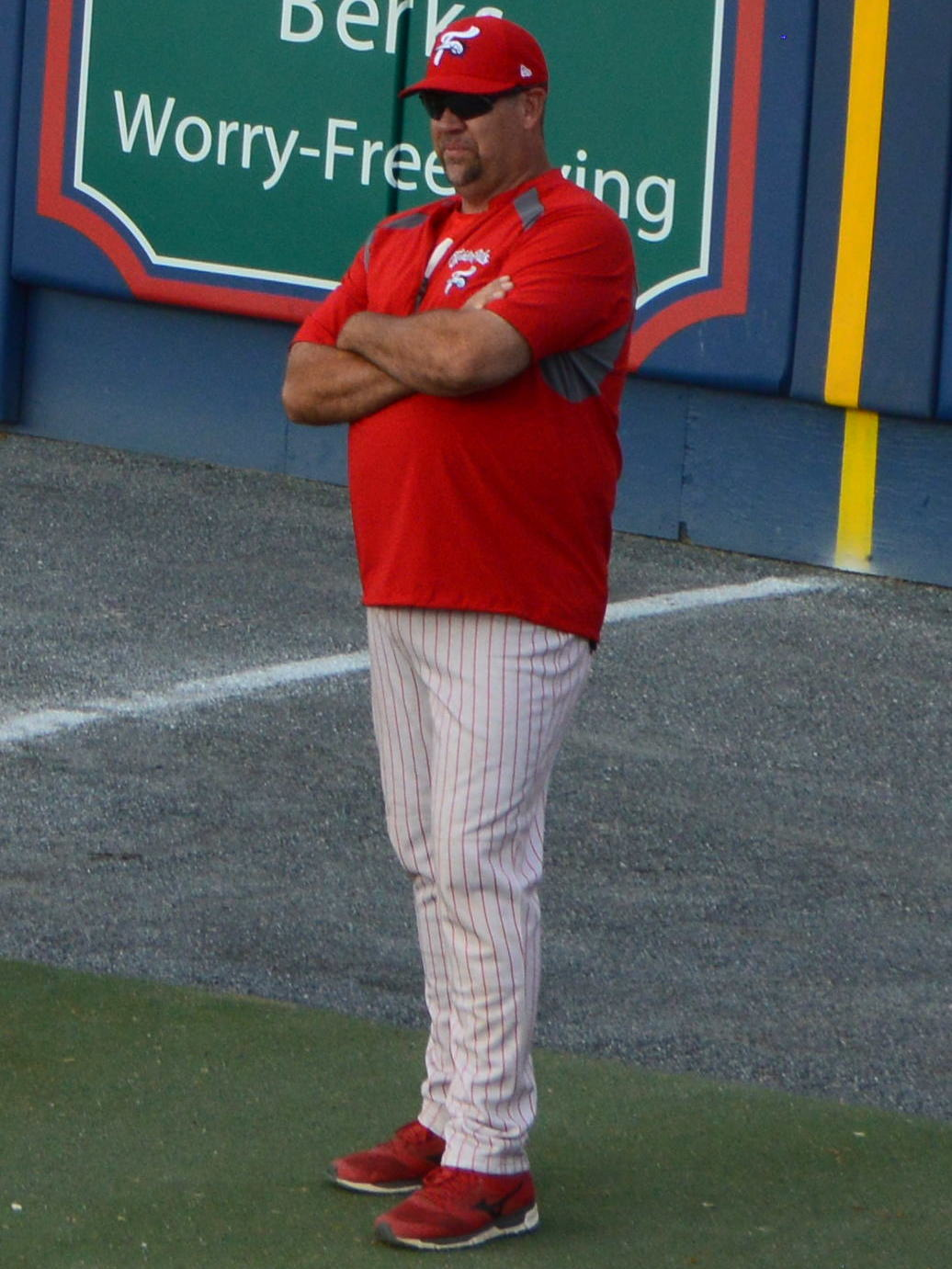
- Schrenk with the Reading Fightin Phils in 2018
- Pitcher
- Born: November 20, 1968 (age 56); Chicago, Illinois, U.S.
- Batted: Right Threw: Right

MLB debut
- July 3, 1999, for the Philadelphia Phillies

Last MLB appearance
- July 16, 2000, for the Philadelphia Phillies

MLB statistics
- Win–loss record: 3–6
- Earned run average: 5.25
- Strikeouts: 55
- Stats at Baseball Reference

Teams
- Philadelphia Phillies (1999–2000)

Steven Wayne Schrenk (born November 20, 1968) is an American former professional baseball pitcher. He played two seasons in Major League Baseball (MLB) for the Philadelphia Phillies.

== Career ==
He was drafted by the Chicago White Sox in the 4th round of the 1987 amateur draft. Schrenk played his first professional season with their Rookie league Gulf Coast League White Sox in 1987, and his last with their Triple-A Charlotte Knights in 2002. He is currently the pitching coach for the Syracuse Mets.

Schrenk won three games in the major leagues, all with the Phillies. On August 4, 1999, he picked up his only major league save during a 4-1 Phillies victory over the Marlins.

He was formerly Pitching Coach for the Gulf Coast League Phillies as well as for the Phillies' Class A affiliate team, New Jersey’s Lakewood BlueClaws, and the Class AA affiliate, the Reading Phillies, and was the manager/coach of the Canberra Cavalry (Canberra, Australian Capital Territory) in the Australian Baseball League for the 2011 season. In 2015, he returned to the Philadelphia Phillies organization as a pitching coach for the High-A Clearwater Threshers. He was promoted back to the AA Reading Phillies for the 2016 season. In early 2017, he helped coach the pitching staff for the Granville Blue Aces, a high school in Granville, Ohio, from January until late February 2017.

Schrenk was named as the pitching coach for the Reading Fightin Phils of the 2018 season.

Steve and his wife, Jennefer, launched their business, Pitching Coach Pro, on July 1, 2017.
