= 2023–24 Australian Baseball League season =

Sports tournament

- League: Australian Baseball League
- Sport: Baseball
- Duration: 17 November 2023 – 4 February 2024
- Teams: 6

Regular season
- Season MVP: Lachlan Wells

Postseason
- Champions: Adelaide Giants
- Runners-up: Perth Heat

Seasons
- ← 2022–23 2024–25 →

The 2023–24 Australian Baseball League season was the thirteenth season of the Australian Baseball League (ABL), and began on 17 November 2023. The Adelaide Giants won their second consecutive championship, beating the Perth Heat two games to one in a best-of-three Championship Series.

== Teams ==
Six teams competed in the season, down from eight in the previous season, due to Auckland Tuatara being liquidated and Geelong-Korea's exit from the league.

Teams in the ABL
Team	State/Territory	Stadium
Adelaide Giants	South Australia	Dicolor Australia Stadium
Brisbane Bandits	Queensland	Viticon Stadium
Canberra Cavalry	Australian Capital Territory	MIT Stadium
Melbourne Aces	Victoria	Melbourne Ballpark
Perth Heat	Western Australia	Empire Ballpark
Sydney Blue Sox	New South Wales	Blue Sox Stadium

== Regular season ==
The regular season began on 17 November 2023 and is scheduled to end on 21 January 2024. Due to the departure of Auckland Tuatara and Geelong-Korea, the ABL returned to a six-team, single-conference model. Each team will play 40 games (20 home and 20 away) across 10 rounds and will face every other team twice (once at home and once away) in four-game series.

The 1 December game scheduled between Canberra and Perth was originally postponed due to rain but later cancelled due to the lack of suitable schedule space to make up the game. Adelaide was the first team to clinch a playoff position in Round 8, followed shortly after by Brisbane and Perth in the same round. Canberra was eliminated in the same round, leaving just Melbourne and Sydney to fight for the final playoff spot in the final two rounds.

Highlights from the regular season include Adelaide's Nick Ward tying the single-game hit record (6) on 14 December with Shuhei Fukuda, formerly of Brisbane. Tim Kennelly surpassed Trent D'Antonio's all-time games record of 395 on 15 December 2023 and became the first player to 400 games in Round 8.

Trent Thomas, the league's most capped umpire became the first to surpass 300 games 19 November 2023.

=== Standings ===
Key
Postseason

Pos	Team	W	L	Pct.	GB
1	Adelaide Giants	29	11	.725	—
2	Perth Heat	24	15	.615	4.5
3	Brisbane Bandits	22	18	.550	7.0
4	Melbourne Aces	21	19	.525	8.0
5	Canberra Cavalry	12	27	.308	16.5
6	Sydney Blue Sox	11	29	.275	18.0

=== Statistical leaders ===
Batting leaders
Stat	Player (Note: Minimum 2.7 PAs per team game.)	Team	Total
AVG	Cory Action	Canberra Cavalry	.333
HR	Greg Bird	Melbourne Aces	11
RBI	Greg Bird	Melbourne Aces	40
R	Nick Ward	Adelaide Giants	40
H	Nick Ward; Quincy Latimore	Adelaide Giants; Adelaide Giants	47
SB	Aaron Whitefield	Melbourne Aces	14

Pitching leaders
Stat	Player (Note: Minimum 0.8 IP per team game.)	Team	Total
W	Lachlan Wells	Adelaide Giants	6
L	Matthew Rae	Sydney Blue Sox	6
ERA	Lachlan Wells	Adelaide Giants	0.94
K	Ryan Bollinger	Brisbane Bandits	68
IP	Ryan Bollinger	Brisbane Bandits	56 1/3
SV	Carter Hope	Brisbane Bandits	8

=== Awards ===
Season awards
Award	Player	Team	Ref
Helms Award (MVP)	Lachlan Wells	Adelaide Giants	
Postseason MVP	Todd van Steensel	Adelaide Giants	
Pitching Champion	Lachlan Wells	Adelaide Giants	
Hitting Champion	Nick Ward	Adelaide Giants	
Reliever of the Year	Sam Gardner	Brisbane Bandits	
Defensive Player of the Year	Logan Wade	Brisbane Bandits	
Rookie of the Year	Alex Skepton	Brisbane Bandits	

== Postseason ==
The postseason began on Australia Day, 26 January 2024, with four teams making the playoffs. All postseason series will use a best-of-three format, with the first-placed Adelaide Giants hosting the fourth-placed Melbourne Aces and the second-placed Perth Heat hosting the third-placed Brisbane Bandits. The winners of the semi-finals competed the Claxton Shield, beginning on 2 February 2024.

=== Postseason bracket ===
Semi-Final Series; January 26–28
1	Adelaide Giants	2	3	2
4	Melbourne Aces	3	2	1
2	Perth Heat	7	9	5
3	Brisbane Bandits	0	12	4

Championship Series; February 2–4
1	Adelaide Giants	3	6	3
2	Perth Heat	4	3	1
