= Jack Murphy (baseball) =

American baseball player (born 1988)

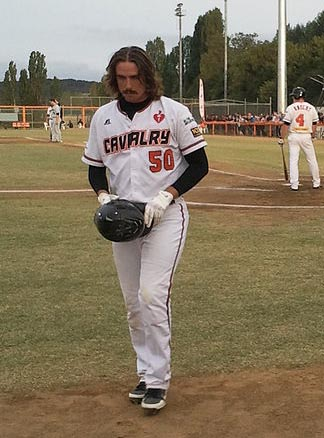
- Murphy with the Canberra Cavalry

Free agent
- Catcher
- Born: April 6, 1988 (age 37); Sarasota, Florida
- Bats: Switch Throws: Right
- Stats at Baseball Reference

John Joseph "Jack" Murphy (born April 6, 1988) is an American former professional baseball catcher. He was drafted by the Toronto Blue Jays played in their minor league affiliate system from 2009 to 2015. Murphy has also played three seasons for the Canberra Cavalry of the Australian Baseball League, being named an All-Star in all 3 seasons. In 2013, the team won the Australian Championship and the 2013 Asia Series Championship, and in 2014, Murphy was named Canberra's most valuable player.

== College ==
Murphy attended Princeton University in Princeton, New Jersey.

== Professional career ==
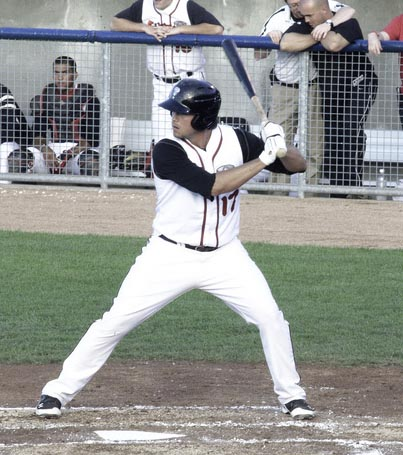
Jack Murphy with the Lansing Lugnuts

=== Toronto Blue Jays ===
Murphy was drafted by the Toronto Blue Jays in the 31st round of the 2009 Major League Baseball draft, and assigned to the Gulf Coast League Blue Jays. He was later promoted to the Short-Season A Auburn Doubledays and finished the 2009 season with a .268 batting average, 3 home runs, and 22 RBI. In 2010, Murphy played 35 games with the Doubledays, and 2 with the Class-A Lansing Lugnuts. He batted .220 with 3 home runs and 13 RBI. He played 50 games in Lansing in 2011, earning a late promotion to the Double-A New Hampshire Fisher Cats, and finished the year with a .220 average, 3 home runs, and 24 RBI.

2012 saw Murphy play in a career-high 94 games, most of which were with the Advanced-A Dunedin Blue Jays. He also recorded career-highs in home runs and RBI, with 12 and 55 respectively. In the offseason, Murphy played for the Canberra Cavalry of the Australian Baseball League, and batted .304 with 5 home runs and 22 RBI. In 2013, Murphy played 56 games with New Hampshire and 3 with the Triple-A Buffalo Bisons, batting .220 with 3 home runs and 22 RBI. He again played with Canberra in the offseason, batting .306 with 2 home runs and 27 RBI. Canberra would go on to win the Australian Championship that season, defeating the Perth Heat. Murphy returned to the Fisher Cats for most of the 2014 season, playing 42 games in New Hampshire and 11 in Buffalo. He batted a combined .221 with 6 home runs and 17 RBI. In his third season with Canberra, Murphy won the team's Silver Slugger and MVP awards, batting .353 with 6 home runs and 37 RBI. The Blue Jays invited him to 2015 spring training after the Australian season ended.

=== Los Angeles Dodgers ===
Murphy was traded to the Los Angeles Dodgers on September 13, 2015, for Darwin Barney. The Dodgers assigned him to the Triple-A Oklahoma City Dodgers to begin the season. He played in 73 games for Oklahoma City, hitting .250/.358/.327 with 3 home runs and 24 RBI. He returned to Oklahoma City the following season, and played in 57 games split between them and the Double–A Tulsa Drillers; in 163 total at-bats, he hit .141/.237/.184 with no home runs and 13 RBI. He elected free agency following the season on November 6, 2017.

=== Cleveland Indians ===
Murphy signed a minor league contract with an invitation to spring training with the Cleveland Indians on January 22, 2018. He was released on April 6, 2018.

=== Miami Marlins ===
On February 28, 2019, Murphy signed a minor league contract with the Miami Marlins. He was released on April 1, 2019.
