= Alex Wells =

Australian baseball player (born 1997)

Alexander Wells
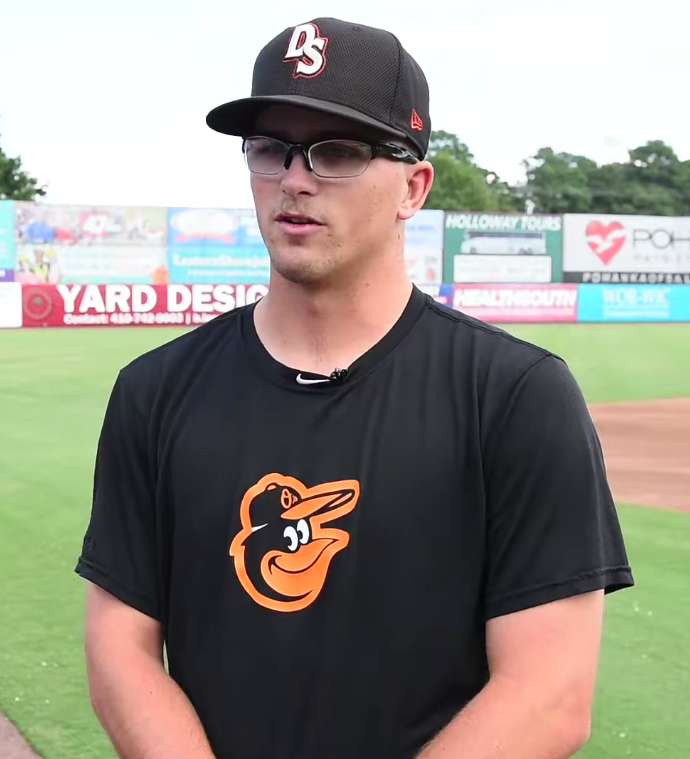
- Wells with the Delmarva Shorebirds

East Belmont Saints
- Pitcher
- Born: 27 February 1997 (age 29); Newcastle, New South Wales, Australia
- Bats: Left Throws: Left

MLB debut
- June 26, 2021, for the Baltimore Orioles

MLB statistics (through 2022 season)
- Win–loss record: 2–3
- Earned run average: 6.60
- Strikeouts: 32
- Stats at Baseball Reference

Teams
- Baltimore Orioles (2021–2022)

Alexander James Wells (born 27 February 1997) is an Australian professional baseball pitcher for the East Belmont Saints of the Geelong Baseball Association. He has previously played in Major League Baseball (MLB) for the Baltimore Orioles.

== Professional career ==
=== Baltimore Orioles ===
Wells signed with the Baltimore Orioles organization as an international free agent on August 29, 2015. He made his professional debut in 2016 with the Low-A Aberdeen IronBirds, and spent the whole season there, posting a 4–5 record, 2.15 ERA, and a 0.91 WHIP. He spent 2017 with the Single-A Delmarva Shorebirds, pitching to an 11–5 record with a 2.38 ERA in 25 games started.

Wells spent the 2018 season with the High-A Frederick Keys, going 7–8 with a 3.47 ERA in 135 innings. He opened the 2019 season with the Double-A Bowie Baysox, and spent the season with the team, logging a 8-6 record and 2.95 ERA in 24 appearances. He played in the Arizona Fall League for the Surprise Saguaros following the 2019 season.

Wells did not play in a game in 2020 due to the cancellation of the minor league season because of the COVID-19 pandemic. On November 20, 2020, Wells was added to the Orioles' 40-man roster. He was assigned to the Triple-A Norfolk Tides to begin the 2021 season, where he posted a 5.63 ERA in 8 appearances.

On June 25, 2021, Wells was promoted to the major leagues for the first time. He made his MLB debut the following day, pitching in relief against the Houston Astros. Wells collected his first major league win against the Astros in Baltimore's 13–3 win on June 29. Wells was optioned back to Norfolk following the game.

Wells began the 2022 season with Baltimore and was optioned to Norfolk on April 17. On May 1, it was announced that Wells would miss 8–12 weeks after suffering a Grade 1 UCL strain. On September 16, Wells was activated from the injured list; he was subsequently removed from the 40-man roster and sent outright to Triple–A Norfolk. He elected free agency following the season on November 10.

After not playing professionally for two seasons, Wells joined the Australian Baseball League for the first time in his career, signing with the Sydney Blue Sox for the 2024–25 Australian Baseball League season where he is 5-1 with a 1.56 ERA in his first nine starts.

== International career ==
Wells was on Australia's roster for the 2017 and 2026 World Baseball Classic.

== Personal life ==
His twin, Lachlan Wells, pitches in the KBO.
