= Canberra Cavalry =

Australian professional baseball team

- Logo

Information
- League: Australian Baseball League
- Location: Canberra, Australian Capital Territory
- Ballpark: Narrabundah Ballpark
- Founded: 2010 (16 years ago)
- Folded: 2025
- Nickname: Cavs
- Asia series championships: 1 (2013)
- League championships: 2 (2012–13, 2024–25)
- Division championships: 1 (2012–13)
- Playoff berths: 7
- Colours: Orange; Black; White
- Retired numbers: 41
- Ownership: Infielder Pty Ltd
- Licence Holders: (Australia) Adrian Dart / Paul Kelly
- General manager: (Australia) Adrian Dart
- Manager: (United States) Jim Bennett
- Website: Canberracavalry.com.au

Current uniforms

The Canberra Cavalry (nicknamed Cavs) were a professional baseball team from Canberra, ACT, Australia. Established in 2010, the team was a founding member of the Australian Baseball League (ABL). The Cavs home ground was Narrabundah Ballpark. The Cavalry were two-time Claxton Shield Champions and one-time Asian Champions.

== History ==
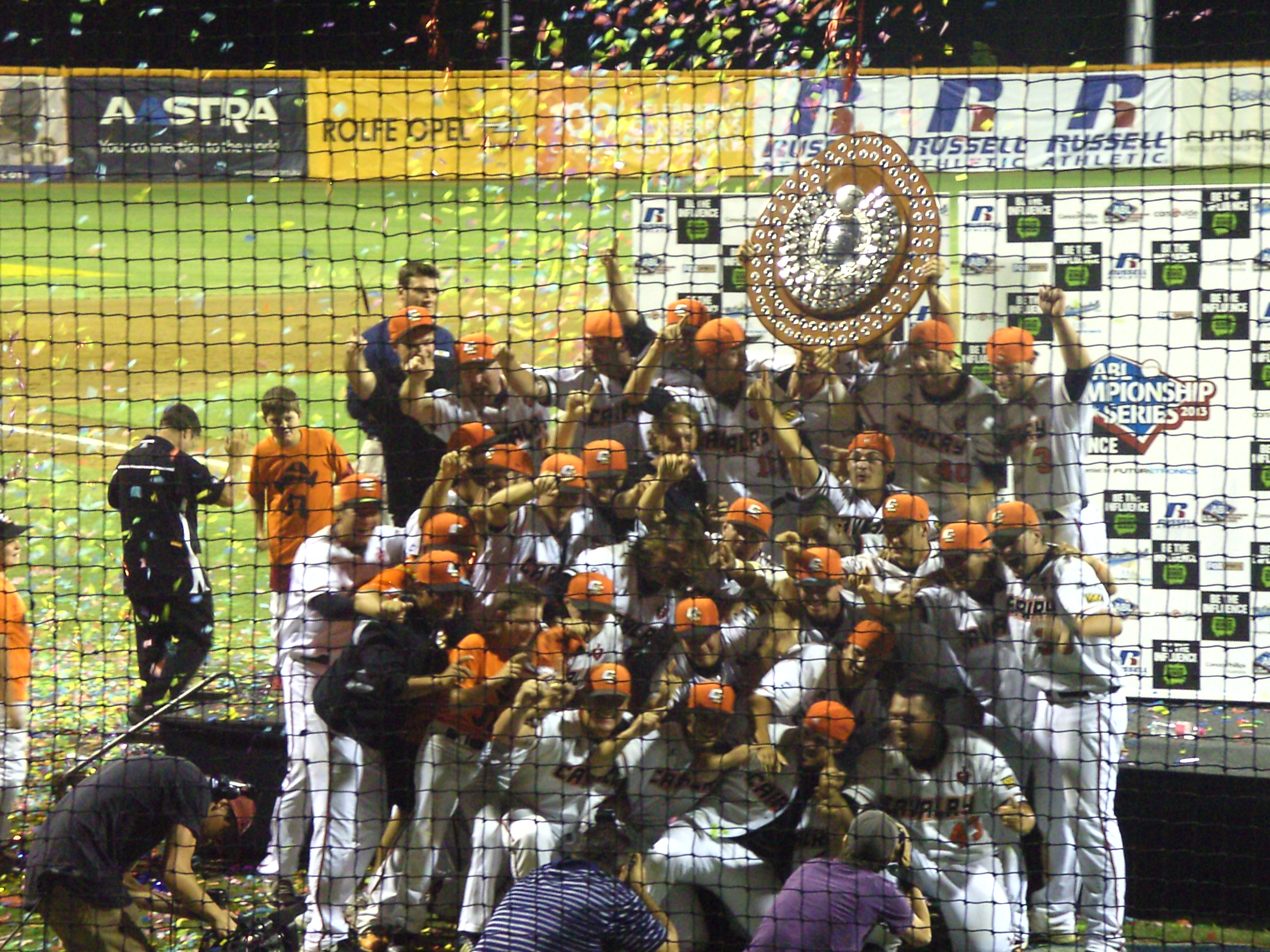
Canberra Cavalry baseball team, with the Championship Claxton Shield for 2012–13

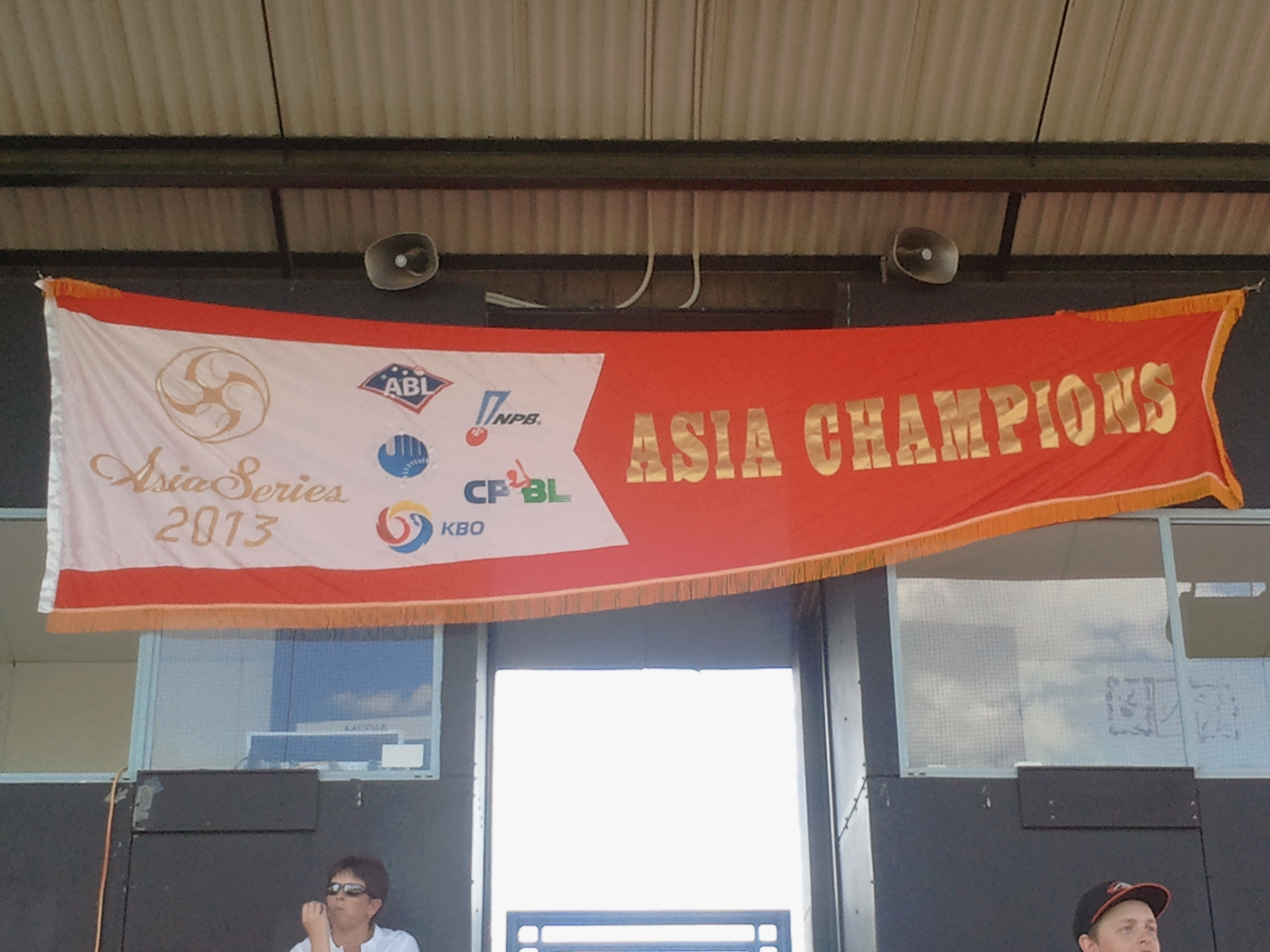
2013 Asia Series champions banner

The Cavalry first primary logo used first eight seasons between 2010/11 – 2018/19

Special anniversary logo used on jersey sleeve patches to celebrate the Cavalry's 10 years of operation during the 2019–20 season

=== Bid and establishment ===
In 2009, Major League Baseball (MLB) invited Canberra to bid for the sixth and final licence to join the inaugural season of the reformed Australian Baseball League (ABL). The bid, named "Let's do it Canberra", was organised by ACT Baseball Association Commissioner Theo Vassalakis and was tasked with meeting the entry criteria of securing the needed sponsorship, community membership and facility upgrades by September 2009. This included three-year sponsorship deals worth $100,000 per annum, 5,000 $20 memberships and ACT Government funding to upgrade the Narrabundah Ballpark to AA standard. In November 2009, Canberra's bid was successful and the ABL in conjunction with the MLB made the announcement of the decision to grant an ABL licence to the successful bidding team.

The team was subsequently founded in 2010 as the Canberra Cavalry. The team entered the reformed Australian Baseball League (ABL) as sixth and final founding member, following the establishment of five other teams from capital cities around Australia.

Originally the team was going to be named the Canberra Colts, but a legal dispute with Canberra-based Super Rugby team, ACT Brumbies, resulted in the team changing their plans and choosing Cavalry instead. The Brumbies local rugby union premier division is named the Colts, with all teams competing in the division adopting the moniker at the end of their club names.

=== First season (2010–11) ===
The Cavalry started putting their front and back office staff in 2010 in the lead up to the ABL regular season starting in November 2010. Tony Fraser was appointed the team's founding general manager with Megan Salic joining as assistant general manager. On 8 September 2010, the Cavs announced former MLB and Philadelphia Phillies pitcher Steve Schrenk would be the team's inaugural head coach. Schrenk arrived in Canberra from New Jersey with over two decades of playing and coaching experience behind him.

On 7 November 2010, Canberra lost its first ever ABL game away in Sydney against the Sydney Blue Sox. At Blacktown Olympic Park, the game was the inaugural ABL game with ABL Operations Manager, Ben Foster, and young Australian baseballer, Louis Verdon, arriving on the pitch by helicopter to open the game by passing on the ball Foster caught off the final pitch of the original ABL in February 1999. Verdon then delivered the first ceremonial pitch of the new ABL. Steven Kent impressed for Canberra but the visitors lost the game 0–1.

The Cavalry won their first ABL game on 18 November 2010 at home in Narrabundah. In front of 1,300 fans, Korean import, Kyu-Hyun Moon inspired Canberra to a 5–2 victory over the Melbourne Aces with a left field home run, the first ever home run at the new Narrabundah Ballpark.

The Cavs missed out on the play-offs in their first season despite having a very good defensive record. Their offense however was not as impressive, ranking sixth in runs scored. Dutch born shortstop Didi Gregorius, was named ABL Golden Glove winner for the inaugural ABL season. Didi, who attracted 43 votes, beat Perth catcher Allan de San Miguel (39 votes) and Adelaide's Stefan Welch (38 votes) to the award.

=== Australian and Asian champions ===
In 2012–13, the Cavs claimed the ultimate titles on offer to Australian baseball teams. They finished the regular season in top spot in the league standings, clinching the minor premiership and qualifying for the playoffs. Canberra was selected as the home venue for the best of three Championship series, which would be broadcast in 40 countries worldwide and a possible audience for 40 million people. Canberra defeated the Perth Heat in the Championship series to claim the ABL Championship and lift the historic Claxton Shield. The Cavs won the series 2–0 with a 6–4 first game win followed by Michael Wells scoring the final home run to secure a 7–6 game two victory. Aaron Sloan was named series MVP. This was a turnaround for a team that finished last in the regular ABL season in 2011–12. A fun fact, during the 2012–13 season, fan action caused the team to change the shirt number of player Marcus Knecht. He was originally wearing shirt number 51 but fans requested he should wear the number 4, in allusion to the game Connect Four; and, this became his catch-cry.

By winning the championship, the Cavalry qualified for the 2013 Asia Series, where they would face the best teams from across Asia, including Japan, Korea, Taiwan and China. The Cavs went into the Asia Series as underdogs with the Canberra outfit's wage bill of $47,000 for their roster tiny compared to some of their rivals, the Golden Eagles for example spending $23.5 million on their roster.

On the road to the Asian Series final, Canberra won two of three games. They defeated EDA Rhinos 2–0 and lost to Rakuten Golden Eagles 6–3 in the group stage to finish second in their group before defeating Korean team Samsung Lions 9–5 in the semi-finals to qualify for the Asia Series final. It was the first time an Australian team had won a game at the Asia Series and the first time an Australian team had qualified for the final.

In the final, held on 20 November 2013 in Taichung, Taiwan, the Cavs played Taiwanese team Uni-Lions in a one-game winner takes all final. Canberra won the coin toss and was designated the 'home' team. The Cavalry started the game well, leading 2–0 at the end of the first innings. The Lion responded and took a 4–2 lead. The Cavs pulled one back in the fourth innings before a seventh innings blitz saw Canberra score five runs and take a commanding 8–4 lead. The free scoring continued in the eighth innings with the Cavalry scoring a further six runs, including a loaded bases home run, hit by American catcher Jack Murphy. The Cavs pitcher Sean Wesley Toler then sealed the 14–4 victory by pitching out the Lions at the top of the ninth to end the game. The Canberra Cavalry were crowned Asian Champions, with Jack Murphy named most valuable player. The title netted the ABL $500,000 in prize money. It would be reinvested in the league, not just the Cavalry.

=== 2014 to 2021 ===
In 2013–14, the Cavalry looked to go back-to-back and secure a second consecutive Claxton Shield and ABL Championship title. The Cavs finished the regular season in third place in the league standings and qualified for the preliminary final against rivals Sydney Blue Sox. Canberra lost the first game against Sydney in the best of three preliminary final, but fought back and defeated the Blue Sox in the remaining two games to claim the series win. There was a controversial umpire call in the second game that gave the Cavalry the victory and a shot at the series win. Keon Broxton, Sydney outfielder, went 'berserk' when he was called out attempting to run to home base.

Canberra come up against Perth Heat once more in the ABL Championship final series. However, unlike the previous season, Perth took the lead in the series, Canberra levelled before Perth won game three and took out the series and were crowned champions. The Cavs left one win short of their goal for the season.

Between 2014–15 and 2017–18, Canberra made the playoffs twice. In 2015–16, the Cavs finished second in the league standings to qualify for the preliminary finals. The Cavalry had the best attack in the league that season, averaging 5.71 runs per game across the 56-game season, however they had the league worst pitching statistics. In the preliminary final, Canberra came up against Adelaide Bite at home at Narrabundah, after ABL operations manager, Ben Foster, locked in the Canberra venue early for the series regardless of league positioning. A decision made due to the proximity of Australia Day and a desire to get ticket sales moving before then. The series went to three games, with the Canberrans forcing a deciding game, with a close 3–2 win, after losing the first game 6–4. The Cavs could not contain the Bite in the third crucial game however, and lost 9–2, in what was a comfortable win for Adelaide in the end.

In In 2017–18, on the way to the Cavalry finishing third in the league standings to again qualify for the preliminary finals, 10 Cavs players were called up to the ABL All Stars game. Canberra faced Perth Heat in the preliminary final series and in a familiar manner the Cavs lost the opening game, 6–3 and won the second game, 6–3, to force a third game decider. Unlike in 2016, the Cavs won game three in Perth, 3–1, to win the series and advance to their third ever ABL Championship series. In the Championship series, the Cavalry played the Brisbane Bandits, with the first game played in Canberra and the second and third games played in Brisbane at Holloway Field. Canberra was looking for its second Claxton Shield, while the Bandits were looking to become the first team in ABL history to go threepeat and win the championship for the third season in a row. Canberra won at home in game one and then headed north to Brisbane where the Bandits drew the series level and forced a deciding game. Tempers flared in the third game as a tightly contested game saw the Cavalry come up short and lose 4–2, granting Brisbane their historic threepeat ABL title win.

In 2018, the Cavs retired their first jersey number ahead of the opening game of the 2018–19 season. Long time ABL pitcher, Brian Grening, would not be convinced to keep going and retired from playing duties. To mark this occasion, the Cavalry retired his number 41 jersey at Narrabundah Ballpark ahead of then opening home series against the Brisbane Bandits. Grening's number was the first number retirement in Cavs history. The cavalry also decided to celebrate the 998 people and businesses that donated $20 to the 'Let's Do It, Canberra!' bid in 2009 that led to the Cavalry creation in 2010 by inviting all 998 to the opening game of the season for a Campaign Pledge Reunion. Each of the 998 people and businesses were given free double passes to the game as well as an exclusive commemorative game day program, and took to the field before the game for a campaign reunion photo.

In July 2018 the Cavalry management announced they had signed a strategic partnership agreement with Japanese baseball team Yokohama BayStars. The agreement would cover on and off-field aspects of Cavs operations and provide an opportunity pathway for Australian and Japanese players and staff to experience both organisations. The agreement took 12 months to be finalised from first concept.

Canberra also celebrated its history in baseball in 2018, with a throwback night held at Narrabundah in a home series against Auckland Tuatara. The event marked 25 years since the ACT arrived on the national baseball scene and saw the Cavalry play in a throwback Canberra Bushrangers white kit with black pinstripes, teal trim and black caps. The Bushrangers competed in the old Australian Baseball League between 1993 and 1995. A dozen Bushranger alumni attended the event and were presented to the crowd, including current Cavalry manager, Keith Ward, and coach, Michael Wells.

On 3 July 2019, ahead of the new 2019–20 ABL season, the Cavalry announced a major brand redesign at Narrabundah that encompassed new logos, uniforms and merchandise to mark the team's ten-year anniversary.

Canberra's primary logo would remain a horse head but would become a grey horse with orange mane, rather than the original brown horse with black mane. The secondary logo would be updated from an interlocking 'CC' typography into interlocking stylised horseshoes positioned sideways to keep the 'CC' effect.

The new home uniforms would become primarily white with orange accents and feature 'CAVALRY' script on the front with away uniforms predominantly orange with black accents and feature 'CAVS' script on the front. A third uniform was also introduced that is predominantly black with orange accents and featured 'The Capital' script on the front. Home and away uniforms would feature grey pants and either black or grey socks. The new hats included a black, orange, and white colored panel hat with the primary horse logo on the front and an all orange hat with a single sideways horseshoe from the secondary logo.

In October 2019, the Cavalry and MLB team Houston Astros signed an official affiliate partner agreement that would see Astros pay to send players to Canberra each season of the agreement. The length of the agreement was not released publicly.

Also in 2019, the Cavs submitted a bid in July to become part of the new Australian Baseball League women's league. On 24 October 2019, it was announced the Canberra Cavalry was successful in their bid to join the new women's league and was granted one of four licences, alongside Adelaide Giants, Baseball Victoria and the Brisbane Bandits.

=== 2022 ===
Ahead of the 2022 season, it was revealed the Cavs had signed a new overseas partnership agreement with MLB team Toronto Blue Jays. The agreement would see two players from Toronto join the Cavalry for the 2022–23 ABL season. The successful partnership with Yokohama BayStars was renewed, after being suspended during the COVID-19 affected period. Two Japanese pitches would be sent to the Cavalry for the 2022–23 ABL season, off-field support and community engagement would be resumed, including school visits, coaching clinics and a dedicated Japanese themed night at Narrabundah.

=== Second Australian Championship and Disbanding ===
In the 2024–25 Australian Baseball League season, the Cavalry finished only 18-22 but managed to reach the playoffs via tiebreakers after the Melbourne Aces blew a 7-3 lead and lost on the final day of the season. They matched up against the first place Sydney Blue Sox who led Game 1 in Sydney 2-0 and had Canberra down to their final strike with two outs in the ninth inning. However, team captain Robbie Perkins managed to beat out an infield single and the Cavalry rallied with three unanswered runs and held the Blue Sox scoreless in the bottom of the ninth to stun them 3-2. This ignited an improbable Cinderella run for Canberra, as they proceeded to beat Sydney 5-2 in Game 2 to advance to the Claxton Shield finals, then beat 2023-24 runner up Perth Heat 10-8 and 5-0 in Perth to easily earn their second title.

Despite their recent championship, on the heels of the Melbourne Aces announcing their departure from the ABL, the Australian Baseball League announced in May 2025 that the Cavalry had also given up their license and would no longer participate. Unlike the Aces, who had announced they would continue competing as an independent team, the Cavalry did not immediately make any statements regarding the team's future.

== Season-by-season records ==
Canberra Cavalry Season-by-Season Record
Season	Regular season			Playoffs						Manager
Season	Record	Win %	Finish	Result	WC	SF	EF	PF	CHAMP	Manager
2010–11	12–24	.333	6th							(United States) Steve Schrenk
2011–12	20–25	.444	6th							(United States) Steve Schrenk
2012–13	27–19	.587	1st	Champions					Won	(United States) Steve Schrenk, (Australia) Michael Collins
2013–14	22–24	.478	3rd	Runners-up				Won	Lost	(Australia) Michael Collins
2014–15	22–24	.478	4th							(Australia) Michael Collins
2015–16	31–25	.554	2nd	Preliminary Final				Lost		(Australia) Michael Collins
2016–17	20–20	.500	4th							(Australia) Michael Collins
2017–18	24–15	.615	3rd	Runners-up				Won	Lost	(Australia) Michael Collins
2018–19	23–17	.575	3rd ND	Semi Final	Won	Lost				(Australia) Keith Ward
2019–20	17–17	.500	2nd ND	Semi Final	Won	Lost				(Australia) Keith Ward
2020–21	11–14	.440	4th	3rd	Won	Lost	Won	Premature end		(Australia) Keith Ward
2021–22	ABL season cancelled due to COVID-19
2022–23	18–19	.486	3rd ND							(Australia) Keith Ward
2023-24	12–27	.308	5th							(Australia) Keith Ward
2024–25	18–22	.450	4th	Champions					Won	(United States) Jim Bennett
Totals	277–192	0.591	–	12–13 Playoff Record; 4 Championship series, 2 ABL Championship						–

== Championships ==
- Claxton Shield

(gold) Champions (2): 2012–13, 2024–25
(silver) Runners-Up (2): 2013–14, 2017–18

- Minor Premiership

(gold) Premiers (1): 2012–13
(silver) Runners-Up (2): 2015–16, 2019–20

- Asia Series

(gold) Champions (1): 2013

== Players ==
=== Roster ===
Canberra Cavalry roster – 2024–25 ABL
Active roster		Coaching staff
Pitchers Right-handed pitchers: 45 (Australia) Jeremy Atkinson; 30 (Australia) Matt Beattie; 2 (Dominican Republic) Carlos Calderon; 8 (United States) Colten Davis; 34 (United States) Jake Dykhoff; 5 (South Korea) Jae-Hyouk Jang; 24 (Australia) Jett Davis; 20 (New Zealand) Elliot Johnstone; 65 (Australia) Mitch Kennedy; 6 (South Korea) Min-Jae Kim; 15 (Australia) Tyson McKee; 38 (Australia) Rhys Niit; 12 (Australia) Nathan Quigg; 3 (Australia) Jack Vanasek; Left-handed pitchers: 40 (Australia) Jon Kennedy; 39 (Japan) Ryo Kohigashi; 22 (United States) Jack Mahoney; 56 (Japan) Takuto Takada	Catchers: 29 (Australia) Jordan Kelly; 24 (Venezuela) Miguel Palma; 9 (Australia) Robbie Perkins; Infielders: 17 (Australia) Harry Austin; 25 (Australia) George Callil; 27 (United States) Matt Halbach; 7 (Australia) Sam Kimmorley; 55 (New Zealand) Jason Matthews; 33 (United States) Jacob Teter; 10 (Australia) Cameron Tilly; 4 (Australia) Cam Warner; 26 (Australia) Mark Zhang; 21 (United States) Ray Zuberer; Outfielders: 11 (Japan) Atsushi Katsumata; 19 (Canada) Jordan Nwogu; 18 (United States) Miles Simington; 44 (United States) Armond Upshaw	Manager: 12 (United States) Jim Bennett; Coaches: 49 (United States) Mike Couchee; 51 (United States) Derron Davis; 23 (United States) Aharon Eggleston; 36 (Australia) James Philbrick
4 February 2025

=== Alumni in the big leagues ===
Players who have played at least one game for the Cavalry who play, or have played at least one game, for a Major League Baseball (MLB) team in North America or a Nippon Professional Baseball (NPB) team in Japan:

Canberra Cavalry Big League Players
Player name	Season with Cavs	MLB or NPB team(s)
(Netherlands) Didi Gregorius	2010–11	Reds, Diamondbacks, Yankees, Phillies
(Germany) Donald Lutz	2010–11, 2020–21	Cincinnati Reds
(United States) Kevin Kiermaier	2011–12	Tampa Bay Rays, Toronto Blue Jays
(United States) John Holdzkom	2012–13	Pittsburgh Pirates
(United States) Jon Berti	2013–14	Toronto Blue Jays, Miami Marlins
(United States) Anthony Alford	2014–15	Toronto Blue Jays, Pittsburgh Pirates
(United States) Mitch Walding	2014–15	Philadelphia Phillies
(United States) Aaron Thompson	2015–16	Pittsburgh Pirates, Minnesota Twins
(United States) Ryan Kalish	2017–18	Boston Red Sox, Chicago Cubs
(United States) Tayler Saucedo	2017–18	Toronto Blue Jays
(Japan) Shota Imanaga	2018–19	Yokohama DeNA BayStars, Chicago Cubs
(Japan) Yuki Kuniyoshi	2018–19	Yokohama DeNA BayStars
(Japan) Tomoya Mikami	2018–19	Yokohama DeNA BayStars
(United States) Madison Younginer	2018–19	Atlanta Braves
(United States) J. J. Hoover	2019–20	Reds, Diamondbacks, Brewers
(United States) Gavin Cecchini	2019–20	New York Mets
(United States) Akeel Morris	2019–20	Mets, Braves, Angels
(Japan) Shingo Hirata	2019–20	Yokohama DeNA BayStars
(Japan) Takamasa Kasai	2019–20	Yokohama DeNA BayStars
(Japan) Shinichi Onuki	2019–20	Yokohama DeNA BayStars
(Japan) Kosuke Sakaguchi	2019–20	Yokohama DeNA BayStars
(United States) Shawn Morimando	2020–21	Cleveland Indians, Miami Marlins

== Franchise records ==
These are the franchise records for the Canberra Cavalry through the end of the 2020/21 season.

=== Single season records ===
==== Offensive ====
Hits
Record	Holder	Years
67‡	Brian Burgamy	2011–12
63	Jason Leblejijian	2015–16
62	David Harris	2015–16

Runs Batted In
Record	Holder	Years
50†	Adam Buschini	2012–13
44	David Kandilas	2017–18
44	Jason Leblejijian	2015–16

Doubles
Record	Holder	Years
19†	Jason Leblejijian	2015–16
18	Jay Baum	2017–18
17	Casey Frawley	2012–13

Stolen Bases
Record	Holder	Years
31	Jon Berti	2013–14
16	Jake MacKenzie	2022–23
13	Scott Kelly	2016–17
13	Cory Acton	2023–24

Triples
Record	Holder	Years
5†	Casey Frawley	2013–14
4	Buddy Reed	2017–18
4	Ryan Stovall	2012–13

Walks
Record	Holder	Years
34	Brian Burgamy	2011–12
30	Jon Berti	2013–14
30	Kyle Perkins	2017–18
30	Bryan Pounds	2015–16

Home Runs
Record	Holder	Years
15	Adam Buschini	2012–13
12	Brian Burgamy	2011–12
12	David Kandilas	2017–18
12	Zach Wilson	2018–19

† ABL Single Season Record
‡ Tied with Riley Unroe (2015/16) for ABL Single Season Record

==== Pitching ====
Wins
Record	Holder	Years
7	Steve Kent	2017–18
6	Tim Atherton	2014–15
6	Brian Grening	2015–16
6	Steve Kent	2015–16

Strikeouts
Record	Holder	Years
83	Brian Grening	2015–16
79	Steve Kent	2015–16
76	Steve Kent	2018–19

Saves
Record	Holder	Years
11	Sean Toler	2012–13
11	Sean Toler	2013–14
10	Michael Click	2015–16

=== Career records ===
==== Offensive ====
Games Played
Record	Holder	Years
278	Robbie Perkins	2012–21
184	Kyle Perkins	2010–14, 2016–20
164	Jack Murphy	2012–16

Home Runs
Record	Holder	Years
25	Kyle Perkins	2010–14, 2016–20
23	Zach Wilson	2018–21
22	Robbie Perkins	2012–21

Hits
Record	Holder	Years
248	Robbie Perkins	2012–21
180	Jack Murphy	2012–16
166	David Kandilas	2016–21

Runs Batted In
Record	Holder	Years
122	Robbie Perkins	2012–21
114	Jack Murphy	2012–16
100	Boss Moanaroa	2015–21

Doubles
Record	Holder	Years
45	Robbie Perkins	2012–21
37	Jeremy Barnes	2012–16
37	Jack Murphy	2012–16

Stolen Bases
Record	Holder	Years
31	Jon Berti	2013–14
14	Mike Crouse	2013–14, 2018–19
14	David Kandilas	2016–21

Triples
Record	Holder	Years
5	Casey Frawley	2013–14
4	Buddy Reed	2017–18
4	Ryan Stovall	2012–13

Walks
Record	Holder	Years
97	Robbie Perkins	2012–21
73	Kyle Perkins	2010–14, 2016–20
72	Jack Murphy	2012–16

==== Pitching ====
Innings Pitched
Record	Holder	Years
433.2	Brian Grening	2011–18
320	Steve Kent	2010–21
159	Frank Gailey	2017–21

Wins
Record	Holder	Years
26	Steve Kent	2010–21
25	Brian Grening	2011–18
12	Frank Gailey	2017–21

Strikeouts
Record	Holder	Years
376	Brian Grening	2011–18
355	Steve Kent	2010–21
158	Frank Gailey	2017–21

Saves
Record	Holder	Years
22	Sean Toler	2012–15
20	Steve Kent	2010–21
15	Michael Click	2015–18

== Staff ==
=== Coaching department ===
==== Current coaching staff ====
Canberra Cavalry coaches 2024–25
Name	Role
(United States) Jim Bennett	Manager
(United States) Mike Couchee	Coach
(United States) Aharon Eggleston	Coach
(United States) Derron Davis	Coach
(Australia) James Philbrick	Coach
(Australia) Greg Kent	Executive Officer -

==== Managers ====
The Cavalry have had 3 managers in the team's history. The team's inaugural manager was former Philadelphia Phillies pitcher and Lakewood BlueClaws pitching coach, Steve Schrenk, who was appointed on 8 September 2010.

No.	Name	Term
1	(United States) Steve Schrenk	2010–12
2	(Australia) Michael Collins	2012–18
3	(Australia) Keith Ward	2018–24
4	(United States) Jim Bennett	2024 -

=== Club management ===
==== General managers ====
The Cavalry have had 5 general managers in the team's history.

No.	Name	Term
1	(Australia) Tony Fraser	2010–11
2	(Australia) Peter Bishell	2011–13
3	(United States) Thom Carter	2012–14
4	(Australia) Donn McMichael	2014–19
5	(Australia) Sunny Singh	2019–23
6	(Australia) Ciaran O'Rourke	2023-24
7	(Australia) Adrian Dart	2024 -

==== Assistant general managers ====
The Cavalry have had 6 assistant general managers in the team's history.

No.	Name	Term
1	(Australia) Megan Salic	2010–11
2	(United States) Thom Carter	2011–12
3	(Australia) Anthony Cangelosi	2013–14
4	(Australia) Mac Laudenbach	2015–16
5	(Australia) Sunny Singh	2017–19
6	(United States) Frank Gailey	2021–22

== Home venue ==
The Cavalry's home venue is Narrabundah Ballpark, located in the south-central Canberra suburb of Narrabundah, ACT, Australia. The venue is owned by the ACT Government and has a seating capacity of 2,250. The fans nicknamed the venue "The Fort".

The ballpark received a major renovation upgrade in 2010 with a second stage of upgrades planned for 2017. In January 2018, the ACT Government funded a new $4.5 million upgrade of Narrabundah Ballpark. The purpose of the upgrade was to bring the ballpark up to a standard to attract international use and assist in Cavalry recruitment from Asian and North American affiliated clubs. The upgrade works would include Increasing ground capacity with new match day seating options and a refurbishment of the main grandstand. The building of a new annex for new bathroom, kitchen, bar and function room facilities, as well as space for the establishment of the Canberra Baseball Hall of Fame. The building of a new facility for club officials, scorers, broadcast crew and announcers. Plus, upgrades to the player locker rooms to provide additional space, individual lockers and phone charging points. The upgrade works would take nine months to be completed and be ready in time for the next ABL season. In 2019, the Ballpark became the end-of-season training camp for South Korean baseball team SK Wyverns. In 2020 the Ballpark was again upgraded, this time by CK Architecture on behalf of the ACT Government. The upgrades included building new dugout style seating, upgrades to the entire concourse, building a new clubhouse, bar and new 300 tired-spectator seats for the grandstand as well as improvements to the change rooms and training facilities.

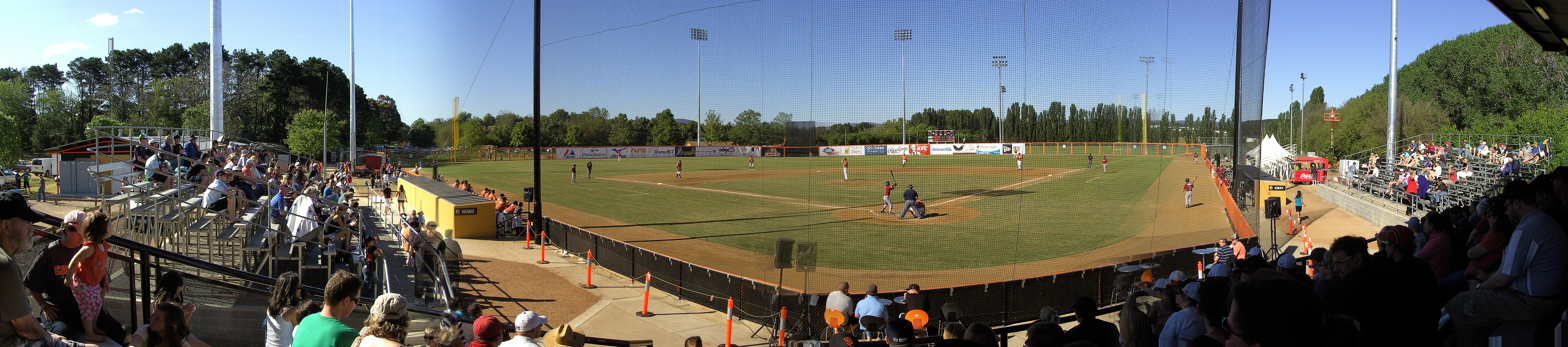
The Fort, 2010, view of the field from grandstand
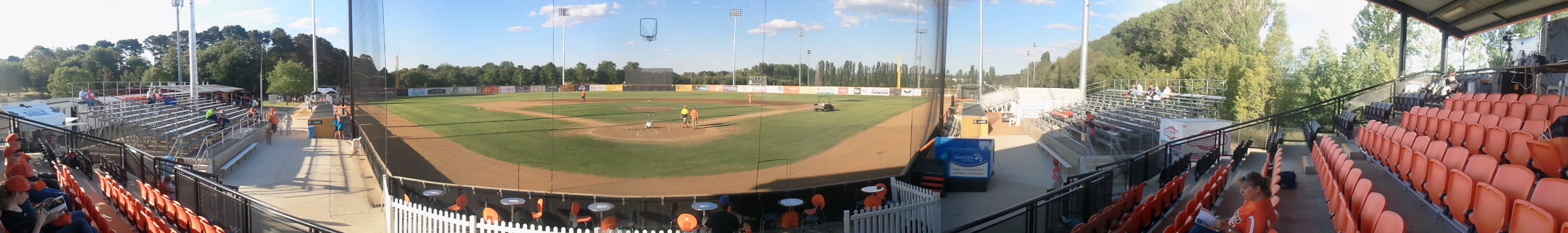
The Fort, 28 November 2014, view of the field from grandstand
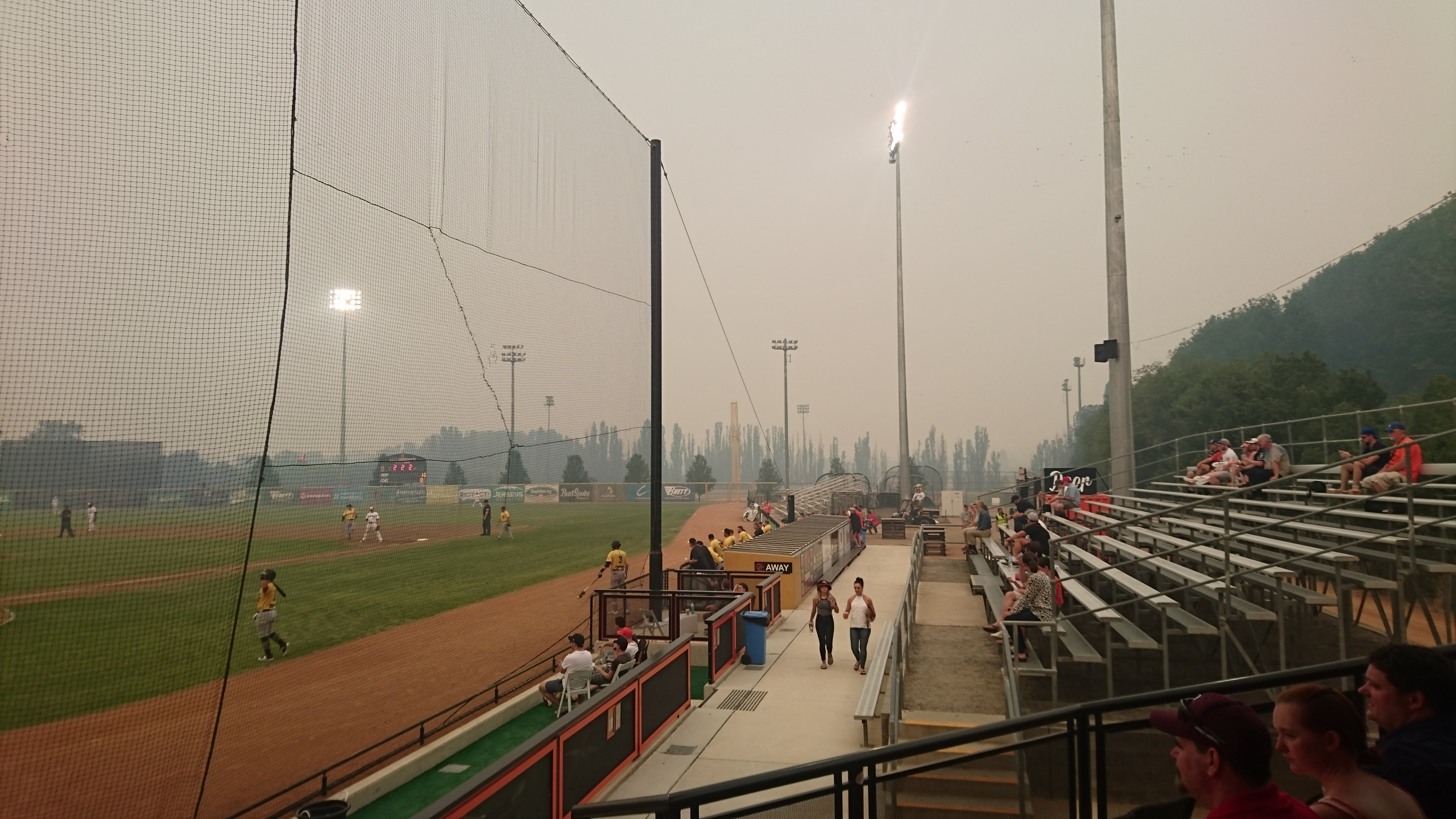
Smoke from the 2019–20 bushfire season, 2019-12-20 @7pm

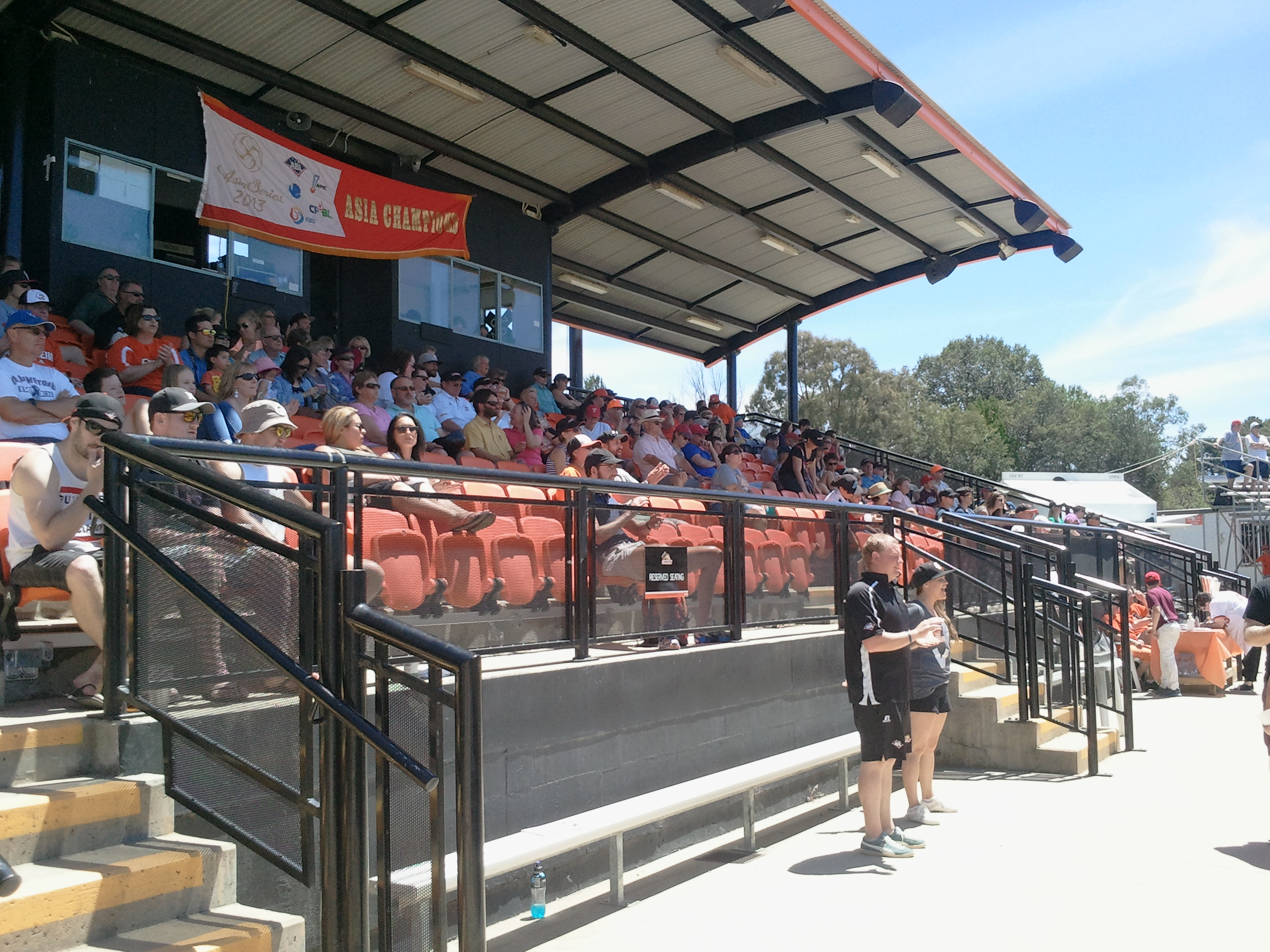
Main Stand at Narrabundah Ballpark

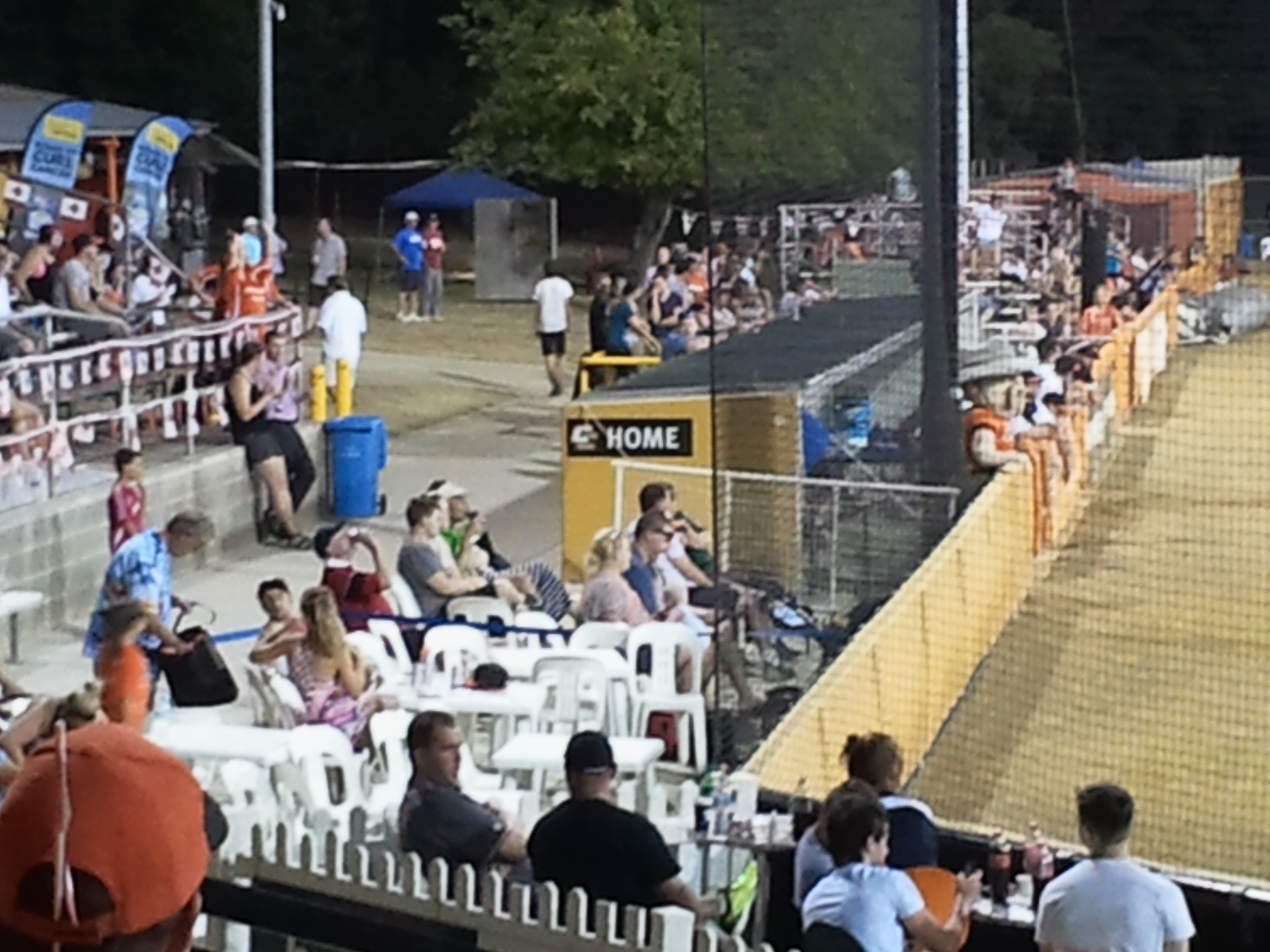
Concourse and dugout at Narrabundah Ballpark

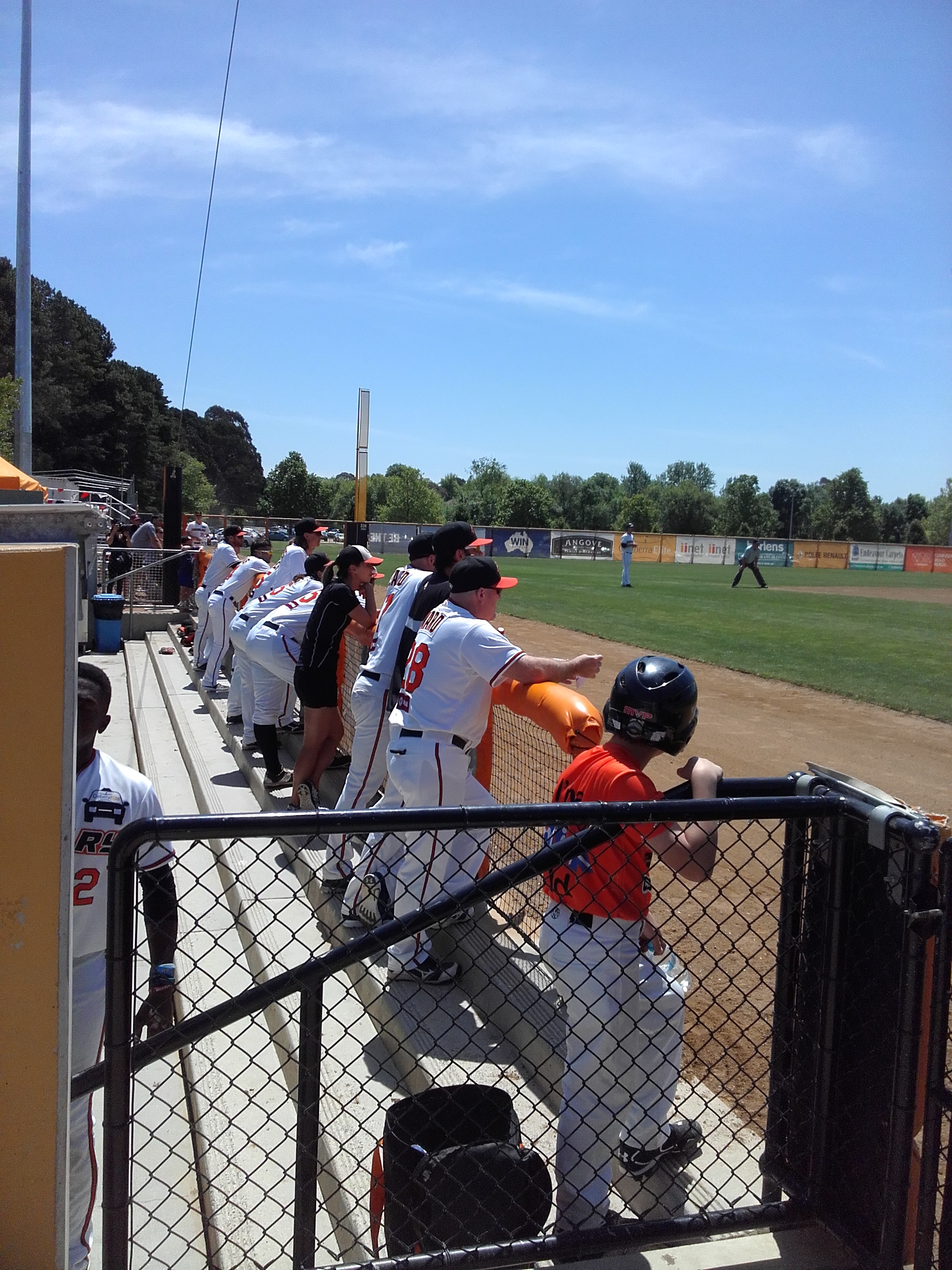
Bullpen at Narrabundah Ballpark

== Club identity ==
=== Ownership ===
Between 2010 and 2015, Major League Baseball and Baseball Australia owned the Canberra Cavalry, along with all other ABL teams. MLB owned a 75% stake, with Baseball Australian owning a 25% stake. Ahead of the 2016–17 season, the MLB ended its lucrative backing of the ABL and each of its teams. Baseball Australia then took full control of the ABL and each team. In 2016 and 2017, the Cavalry were solely owned by Baseball Australia, as BA looked to privatise and sell the ABL team licences.

On 1 May 2018, ownership of the Canberra Cavalry was transferred to private ownership for the first time. Canberra duo Donn McMichael and Dan Amodio became the new owners. They fronted an ownership group of local community investors named Canberra Community Ownership Group. In March 2019, the ownership team of the Canberra Cavalry acquired the Canberra ice hockey franchise team CBR Brave, with a view to creating Canberra's first multi-sport franchise with a single shared back-office creating efficiencies across both winter and summer seasons. In December 2020 the ABL was called into resolve an ownership and management crisis at the Cavalry. The Cavs subsequently called in administrators in early 2021 with the team in over $400,000 debt and in danger of being wound up.

On 26 April 2021, a new ownership team secured the ABL licence for the Canberra Cavalry and rescued the team from the brink after the collapse of the previous ownership with debts of more than $400,000. The new ownership entity that holds the licence is Infielder Pty Ltd. The company is a 50:50 joint venture between Canberran businessmen Brendan Major and Illya Mastoris. Both partners have been invested in ACT baseball for a number of years with Major's IT company, MIT Services, holding the naming rights to the Narrabundah Ballpark and sponsoring the Cavs for five years. Mastoris on the other hand ran the ballpark's food and beverage sales and corporate hospitality for six years. The new owners retained the services of general manager Sunny Singh, who worked under the old ownership team.

=== Rivalries ===
The Canberra Cavalry have a strong rivalry with the Sydney Blue Sox that dates back to the beginning of the Australian Baseball League in 2010. It is the longest rivalry in the league's history. The two teams met in the very first game of the modern league on 6 November 2010 and ever since then they have competed for the Hume Highway Cup. In January 2022, both teams agreed to rename their challenge cup to the Kent-Oxspring Cup, or KO Cup for short. The new name celebrates and recognizes two stalwart players for both teams, Steven Kent for Canberra and Chris Oxspring for Sydney.

=== Community and charitable work ===
The Cavs over the years has conducted community engagement and support and raised money for community and charity organisations. Canberra Cavalry have regularly auctioned game-day memorabilia to raise money for different charitable causes including Legacy Australia, who supports family members of service people, the Canberra Hospital Trust, the Heart Foundation, Red Cross ACT, and The Global Poverty Walk's Matt Napier. Since 2014, Canberra Cavalry mascot, Sarge (Josh Williams) has been raising money for Lifeline. In 2019 and 2021, Josh Williams raised $20,000 for Lifeline by completing the 10 km for $10k challenge. In full Sarge costume, Josh walked from Bentspoke Brewpub in Braddon to Narrabundah Ballpark on both occasions.

In 2020, the Cavs joined other major Canberra sporting organisations, Canberra Capitals, CBR Brave, Canberra United FC, Canberra Raiders, ACT Brumbies, Canberra Chill, ACT Meteors, Basketball ACT, Tennis ACT, Netball ACT, Capital Football and GWS Giants under the #WeAreOne banner to provide support for volunteers and those affected by the Bushfire crisis affecting the NSW South Coast, Monaro and Southern Inlands. The Cavalry auctioned off unique memorabilia to raise funds for the NSW Rural Fire Service as part of the campaign. On 27 October 2020, The Cavs in conjunction with Village Building Co, launched a new fundraising initiative named the Village Building Cavalry Community Fund. The fund would raise money for local Canberra charities. The fund's first event was the Charity Super Bowl. The Cavs co-hosted the inaugural Charity Super Bowl with the Canberra Capitals to raise money for Lifeline Canberra and Menslink. Sixteen corporate teams gathered at Kingpin bowling alley in the Canberra Centre for the event.

The Cavalry are supporters of the LGBTQ+ community and held the ABL's first ever pride night on 17 January 2020. With the theme of inclusiveness, the Cavs hoped to inspire the rest of the ABL and wider sporting community in Canberra to follow and adopt their initiative to support the LGBTQ+ community. The team hosted members and supporters of the LGBTQ+ community and wore special pride jerseys and caps that they later donated.

The Cavs partnership with Yokohama BayStars involves community engagement events such as school visits around Canberra and coaching clinics involving the Japanese players and staff BayStars send over to the Cavs for the ABL season.

=== Team song ===
In 2018, the Canberra Cavalry officially launched a team song titled "Go, Cavs, Go!" The song was released at ANU School of Music and features vocals by local artists Robbie Rosen and Kay Ansah. The song features an upbeat tune composed to perfectly complement the summer months.

Go, Cavs, go!
Go, Cavs, go!
Hey, Canberra, what do you say?
The Cavs are gonna win today! (x2)

=== Mascot ===
The Canberra Cavalry team mascot is a Yosemite Sam-type character named 'Sarge', with an Australian slouch hat, Cavalry-orange shirt, Auscam pants and brown Army boots. Since inception, Sarge has been played by Josh Williams, who has often raised money for Lifeline using the mascot and is a supporter of R U OK? day. The team song, played after winning games, is "I Wanna Be in the Cavalry" by Corb Lund. In the 2014–15 season, Sarge got a 'quad' car and he can be found at Narrabundah Ballpark every home Cavalry game.

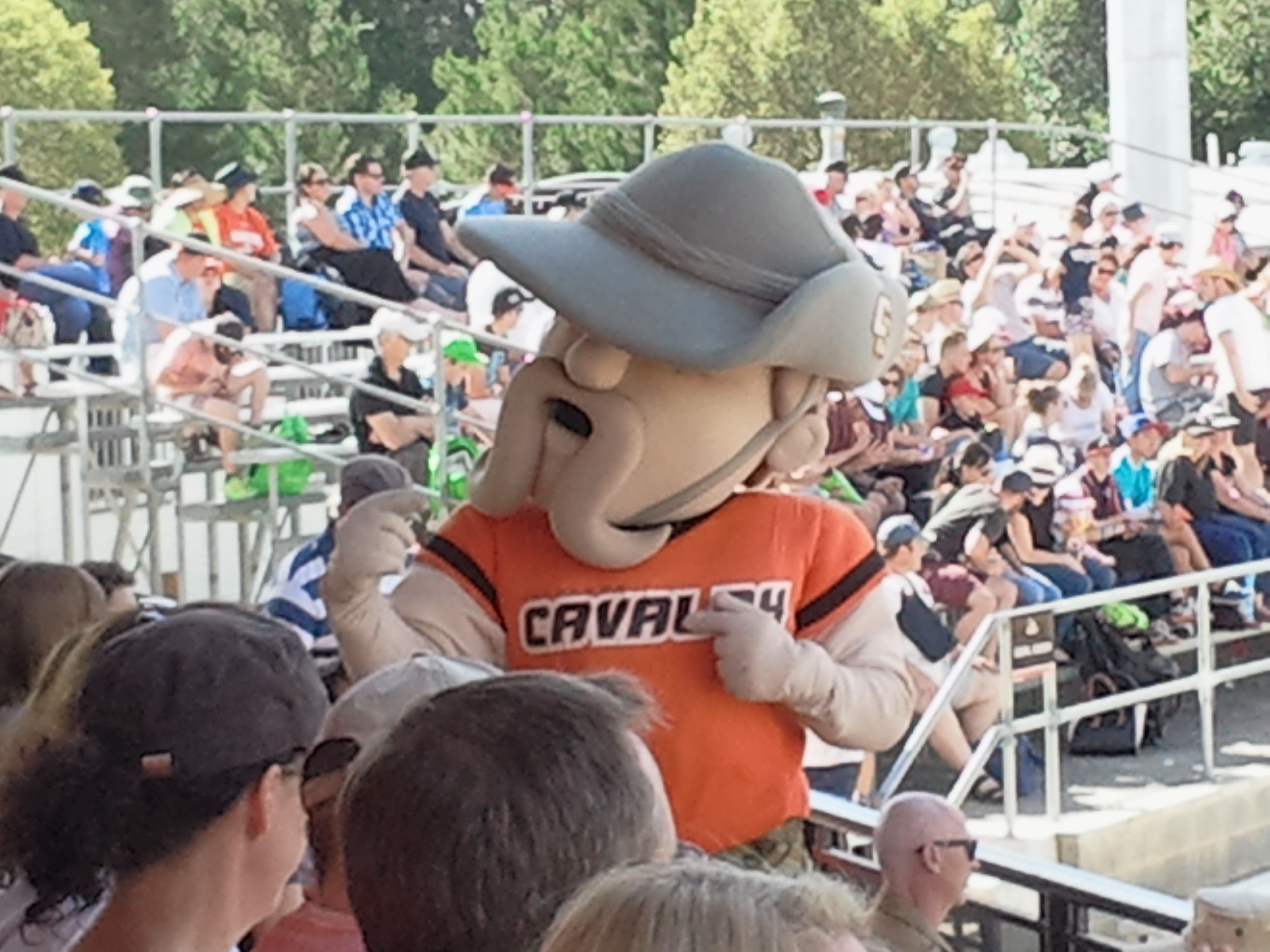
Sarge in the crowd

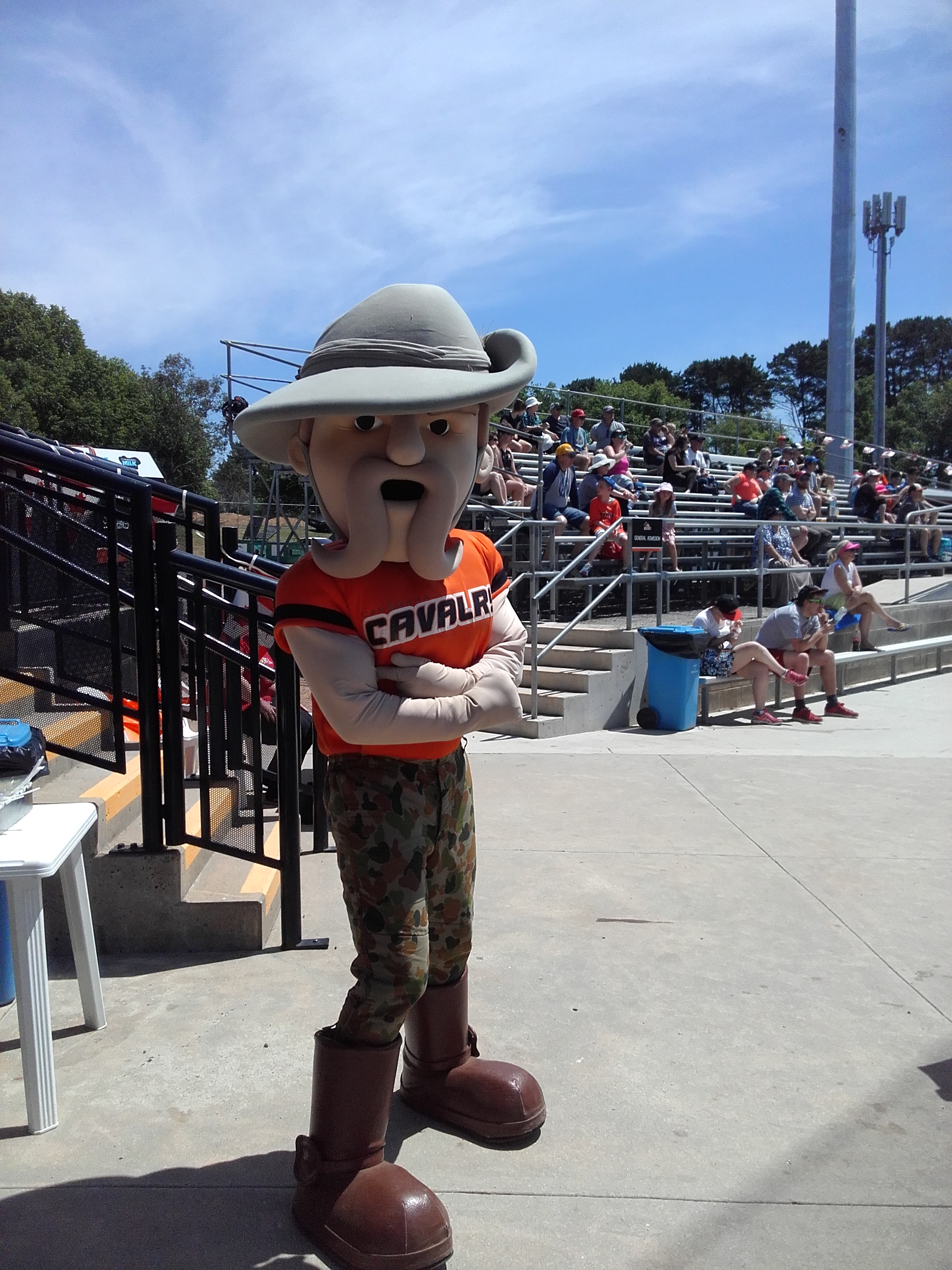
Sarge in 2015

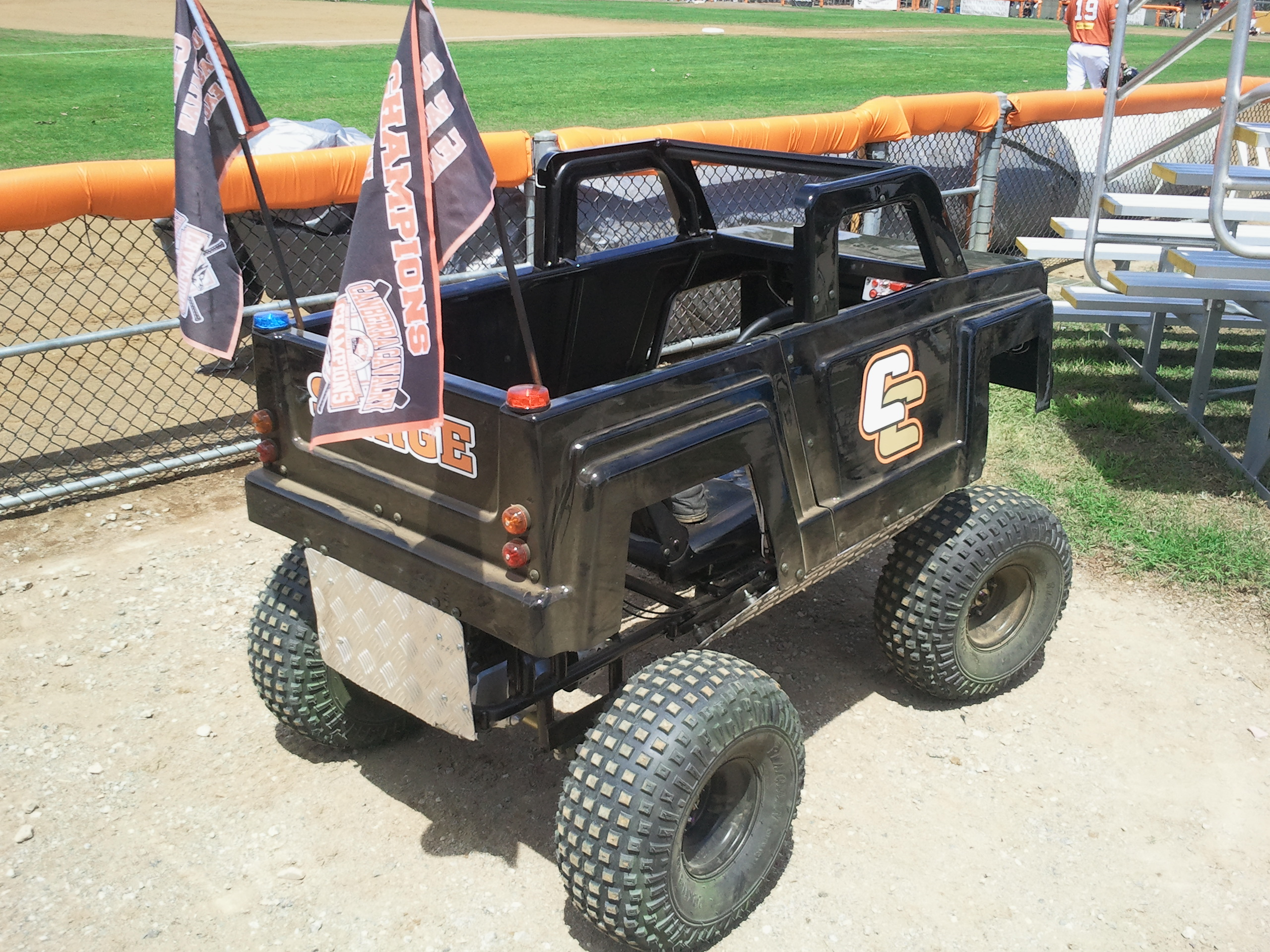
Sarge's 2014 car

== See also ==
- Australian Baseball League
- List of current Australian Baseball League team rosters
- Canberra Bushrangers
- Australian Baseball League (1989–1999)
- Baseball in Australia
