= 2013 Asia Series =

Tournament details
- Country: Taiwan
- Dates: 15 – 20 November
- Teams: 6 (5 countries)

Final positions
- Champions: (Australia) Canberra Cavalry (1st title)
- Runners-up: (Taiwan) Uni-President 7-Eleven Lions

Tournament statistics
- Games played: 9
- Attendance: 56,531 (6,281 per game)

Awards
- MVP: Jack Murphy (Canberra Cavalry)

The 2013 Asia Series was the seventh and final edition of the Asia Series, the premier Asian club baseball tournament, and the ninth time national champions from Asian leagues have competed against each other. The tournament was held in Taichung and Taoyuan, Taiwan, starting on 15 November with the final held on 20 November.

In addition to teams from Nippon Professional Baseball, the Chinese Professional Baseball League, the Korea Baseball Organization, and the Australian Baseball League, this tournament was the first to include a team from Europe. Fortitudo Baseball Bologna was invited to participate as the winners of the 2013 European Cup, a similar tournament in Europe.

The Canberra Cavalry from Australia defeated the Uni-President 7-Eleven Lions of Taiwan 14–4 in the tournament final for their first Asia Series title. It was the first time that an Australian team had won the tournament, as well as the first time the tournament had been won by a team from outside of either Japan or South Korea.

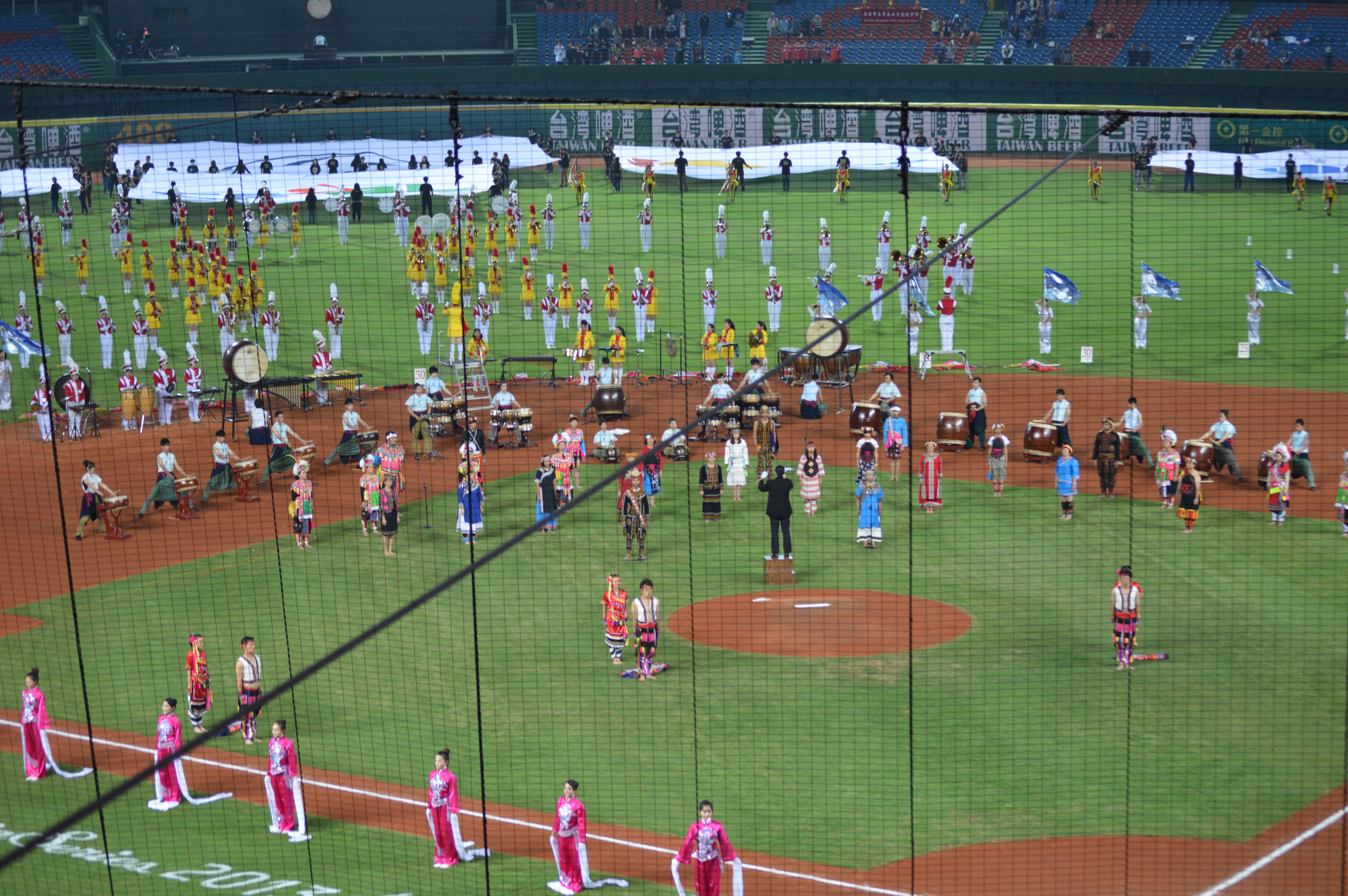
2013 Asia Series

== Participating teams ==
League	Team	Qualification	Location
Australian Baseball League	(Australia) Canberra Cavalry	2012–13 ABL champions	Canberra, Australia
Chinese Professional Baseball League	(Taiwan) Uni-President 7-Eleven Lions	2013 CPBL champions – hosts	Tainan, Taiwan
Chinese Professional Baseball League	(Taiwan) EDA Rhinos	2013 CPBL runner-up	Kaohsiung, Taiwan
Italian Baseball League	(Italy) Fortitudo Baseball Bologna	2013 European Cup champions	Bologna, Italy
Korea Baseball Organization	(South Korea) Samsung Lions	2013 KBO champions	Daegu, South Korea
Nippon Professional Baseball	(Japan) Tohoku Rakuten Golden Eagles	2013 NPB champions	Sendai, Japan

== Venues ==
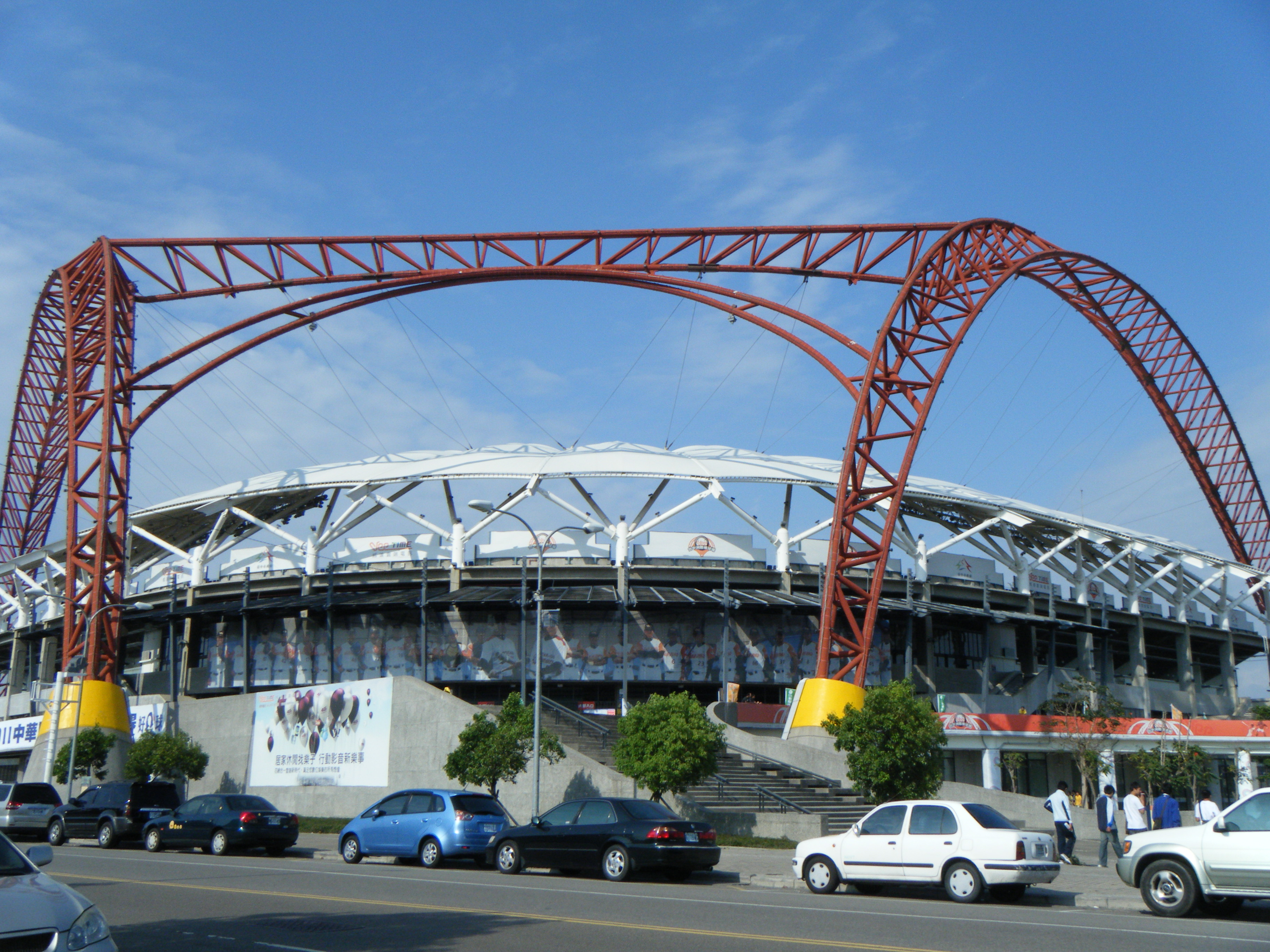
Taichung Intercontinental Baseball Stadium

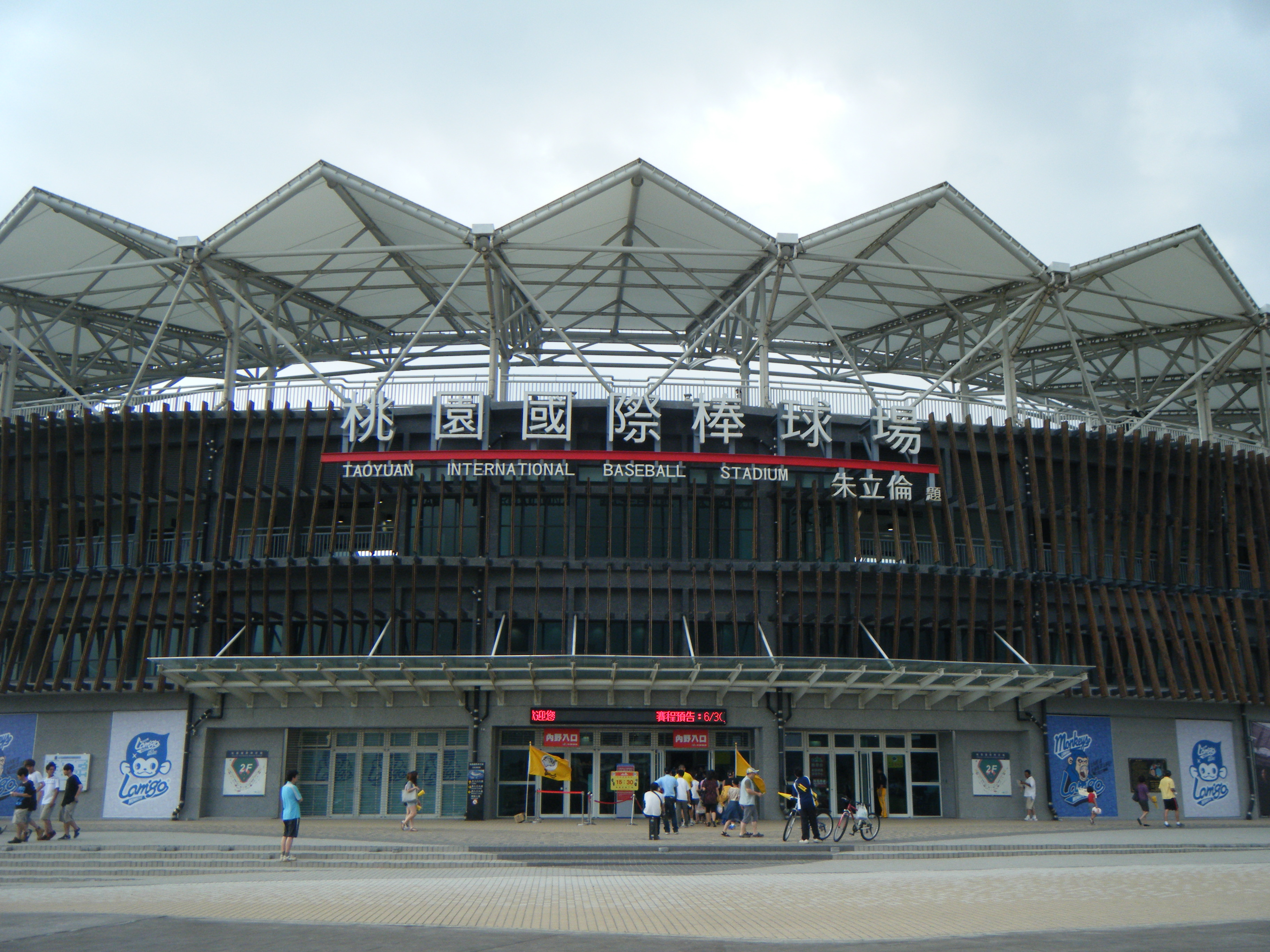
Taoyuan International Baseball Stadium

== Round-robin stage ==
=== Group A ===
Pos	Team	W	L	Pct.	R	RA
1	(South Korea) Samsung Lions	2	0	1.000	10	6
2	(Taiwan) Uni-President 7-Eleven Lions	1	1	.500	14	5
3	(Italy) Fortitudo Baseball Bologna	0	2	.000	2	15

=== Group B ===
Pos	Team	W	L	Pct.	R	RA
1	(Japan) Tohoku Rakuten Golden Eagles	2	0	1.000	12	4
2	(Australia) Canberra Cavalry	1	1	.500	5	6
3	(Taiwan) EDA Rhinos	0	2	.000	1	8

== Knock-out stage ==
Semifinals
A1	(South Korea) Samsung Lions	5
B2	(Australia) Canberra Cavalry	9
B1	(Japan) Tohoku Rakuten Golden Eagles	1
A2	(Taiwan) Uni-President 7-Eleven Lions	4

Final
SF1W	(Australia) Canberra Cavalry	14
SF2W	(Taiwan) Uni-President 7-Eleven Lions	4

== Final standings ==
Rk	Team	W	L	R	RA
1	(Australia) Canberra Cavalry	3	1	28	15
2	(Taiwan) Uni-President 7-Eleven Lions	2	2	22	20
3	(Japan) Tohoku Rakuten Golden Eagles	2	1	13	8
3	(South Korea) Samsung Lions	2	1	15	15
5	(Taiwan) EDA Rhinos	0	2	1	8
5	(Italy) Fortitudo Baseball Bologna	0	2	2	15

== False game-fixing allegation ==
After the conclusion of the series, Canberra Cavalry player, Matt Blazynski (who did not play in the series despite being part of the team), falsely claimed that he was offered $30,000 to fix the final game with Uni-President 7-Eleven Lions. Blazynski claimed that he was approached by an individual with an unspecified amount of cash at a night club, and was promised $30,000 in return for fixing the game on the next day. The claim was investigated by both the police of Taiwan and the CPBL.

On 16 December 2013, CPBL issued a statement and demanded a public apology from ABL. In the statement, CPBL explained that its investigation revealed several inconsistencies between Blazynski's claim and the CCTV footage provided by the night club's security team. For example, Blazynski claimed he was approached by a male individual who showed him a stack of cash. The footage obtained by CPBL shows him approaching a group of three individuals, including two males and one female, and there is no evidence any of them produce the money Blazynski mentioned. These individuals were also interviewed by either the police or CPBL, and there is no evidence suggesting any criminal connection. Furthermore, contrary to his claim that he returned to the hotel at 2:30AM, CCTV footage provided by the hotel reveals that he returned to the hotel around 4:00 with a female individual, who left the hotel approximately two hours later. CPBL also claimed that Blazynski has refused or is unwilling to provide any evidence to substantiate his claim or to explain the inconsistencies between his claim and the recording at the night club. CPBL stated that it is suspending any ongoing cooperation or exchange programs with ABL until the demand of apology is met.

On 6 January 2014, the ABL wrote an official apology, signed by the CEO, Peter Wermuth, for the "Knowingly misleading" claim. ABL apologized on behalf of ABL and the Canberra team for the tremendous damage caused to the competition, to the baseball fans, and to Taiwan's baseball community. In the statement, ABL admitted that "the claim was a complete lie from the Canberra Cavalry player, and he (Matt Blazynski) is a disgrace to the entire baseball community. As such, the ABL has decided to terminate the player's contract immediately." This effectively ended Blazynski's professional baseball career.

== See also ==
- List of sporting events in Taiwan
