= Lachlan Wells =

Australian baseball player (born 1997)

Free agent
- Pitcher
- Born: 27 February 1997 (age 29); Newcastle, New South Wales, Australia
- Bats: Left Throws: Left

KBO debut
- June 25, 2025, for the Kiwoom Heroes

KBO statistics (through 2026 season)
- Win–loss record: 6-6
- Earned run average: 3.95
- Strikeouts: 99
- Stats at Baseball Reference

Teams
- Kiwoom Heroes (2025); LG Twins (2026)

Lachlan Robert Wells (born 27 February 1997) is an Australian professional baseball pitcher who is a free agent. He has previously played in the KBO League for the Kiwoom Heroes and LG Twins.

== Career ==
=== Minnesota Twins ===
Wells pitched for the Sydney Blue Sox in the Australian Baseball League from 2013 to 2015. The Minnesota Twins signed Wells to a minor league contract on 21 November 2014.

Wells made his professional debut in 2015 with the rookie-level Gulf Coast League Twins and spent the whole season there, going 5–2 with a 2.09 ERA and 0.97 WHIP in ten games (nine starts). In 2016, Wells pitched for the Cedar Rapids Kernels, compiling a 6–4 record and 1.77 ERA in 12 starts, and in 2017, he played for the Fort Myers Miracle where he pitched to a 4–10 record and 3.98 ERA in 16 games (14 starts). Wells missed the entire 2018 season after undergoing Tommy John surgery.

In 2019, Wells appeared in only 10 games split between the GCL Twins and Fort Myers, accumulating a 2-6 record and 4.22 ERA with 39 strikeouts in 49 innings pitched. Wells did not play in a game in 2020 due to the cancellation of the minor league season because of the COVID-19 pandemic. Wells made 3 appearances with the Blue Sox between 18 December 2020 and 4 February 2021 with a 1.08 ERA. Wells also did not appear in a game for the organization in 2021 and was released by the Twins on 22 February 2022.

He took the 2022-23 season off, before signing with the ABL's Adelaide Giants in November. In 9 starts, he went 6-0 with a 0.94 ERA, leading the Giants to the ABL finals against the Perth Heat. For his efforts, Wells won the Helms Award as the league's MVP.

=== Philadelphia Phillies ===
On 7 January 2024, Wells signed a minor league contract with the Philadelphia Phillies. Wells will join the Phillies and 11 of his Adelaide teammates for Spring Training in late February. Wells split the 2024 season between the Double-A Reading Fightin Phils and Single-A Clearwater Threshers, accumulating a 6-5 record and 3.47 ERA with 79 strikeouts over 93 1/3 innings of work. Wells elected free agency following the season on 6 November.

=== Kiwoom Heroes ===
On 11 June 2025, Wells signed with the Kiwoom Heroes of the KBO League as an injury replacement for Kenny Rosenberg. He made his debut for the Heroes as a starter on 25 June. Wells' contract expired with the Heroes on 23 July, and he returned to Australia despite being offered a full-season contract after Rosenberg was ruled out for the year.

=== LG Twins ===
On 18 November 2025, Wells signed a one-year, $200,000 contract with the LG Twins of the KBO League. He was released on August 14, 2026, due to injury.

== Personal ==
Wells pitched for the Australian national baseball team in the 2017 and 2026 World Baseball Classic . His twin brother, Alexander Wells, pitched in MLB for the Baltimore Orioles.
