= 2012–13 Australian Baseball League season =

- League: Australian Baseball League
- Sport: Baseball
- Duration: 1 November 2012 – 9 February 2013
- Games: 122
- Teams: 6
- Total attendance: 129,909

Regular season
- Season MVP: Adam Buschini

Championship Series
- Venue: Narrabundah Ballpark
- Champions: Canberra Cavalry (1st title)
- Runners-up: Perth Heat

Seasons
- ← 2011–12 2013–14 →

The 2012–13 Australian Baseball League season was the third Australian Baseball League (ABL) season, and was held from 1 November 2012 to 9 February 2013. The season started with a game between the defending champions Perth Heat and the Adelaide Bite at Norwood Oval in Adelaide.

The season consisted of six teams competing in a 46-game schedule followed by a two-round postseason to determine the ABL champion. During the regular season, the Perth Heat participated in the 2012 Asia Series which included the host team and champion team from Korea Baseball Championship in South Korea, the champions from Nippon Professional Baseball in Japan and Chinese Professional Baseball League in Taiwan, and an all-star team from China Baseball League in China. The 2012–13 champions will likewise qualify for the 2013 Asia Series.

At the conclusion of the regular season, the Canberra Cavalry, the Sydney Blue Sox and the Perth Heat progressed to the postseason. Sydney were eliminated by Perth, to face Canberra in the championship series. Canberra defeated Perth two games to nil to win their first ABL championship and be awarded the Claxton Shield. It was the first time a team from the Australian Capital Territory won the Claxton Shield.

== Changes from 2011–12 season ==
=== Regular season schedule ===
The previous season included 45 games for each team and facing each team nine times. This was expanded for the 2012–13 season to 46 games, to ensure that each team had the same number of home games as road games (23). This change also meant that each team did not play each other team an equal number of times. In the first three rounds, each team had a bye for one round and played one home and one away series of three games each, played "... against their two closest geographical neighbours; building upon both traditional and newly established rivalries." The remaining ten rounds were made up of four–game series with each team playing two series against the five other teams, one at home and one away.

=== Postseason structure ===
In previous seasons, the postseason had followed the Page playoff system, with the top four teams participating over three weeks. However, in the 2012–13 season only the top three teams qualified for a two-week postseason. The team that finished first—the Canberra Cavalry—earned a direct entry into the ABL championship series and the right to host the series. The second- and third-placed teams—the Sydney Blue Sox and the Perth Heat respectively—are playing in the preliminary final series hosted by the higher finishing team. The winner of that series will qualify for the championship series. Reduced from five games in the semi-final and preliminary final series in 2012, all rounds of the 2013 postseason are being held as best–of–three-game series.

== Teams ==

Teams in the ABL
Team	City	State	Stadium	Ref
Adelaide Bite	Adelaide	South Australia	Norwood Oval	
Brisbane Bandits	Brisbane	Queensland	Brisbane Exhibition Ground	
Canberra Cavalry	Canberra	Australian Capital Territory	Narrabundah Ballpark	
Melbourne Aces	Melbourne	Victoria	Melbourne Ballpark	
Perth Heat	Perth	Western Australia	Baseball Park	
Sydney Blue Sox	Sydney	New South Wales	Blue Sox Stadium	

=== Venues ===
Each of the six teams return from the previous season, and five of them will continue to use the same grounds for their home games. The sole exception is the Melbourne Aces, that played at the Melbourne Ballpark in the south-eastern suburb of Altona. As part of the move from the Aces former home, the Melbourne Showgrounds, A$290,000 worth of improvements were made prior to the start of the season, including A$200,000 investment from the Victorian state government. The ground was the home ground of the Melbourne Monarchs and the Melbourne Bushrangers in the former ABL.

=== Rosters ===
As in the previous season, each team has an active roster of 22 players available each round. These players are drawn from 35-man squads. These squads will be confirmed by each of the teams before the beginning of the season.

== Regular season ==
Pos	Team	Pld	W	L	PCT	GB	Qualification
1	Canberra Cavalry	46	27	19	.587	—	Advance to Championship Series
2	Sydney Blue Sox	45	26	19	.578	0.5	Advance to Preliminary final
3	Perth Heat	46	25	21	.543	2	Advance to Preliminary final
4	Brisbane Bandits	45	23	22	.511	3.5	
5	Adelaide Bite	46	21	25	.457	6	
6	Melbourne Aces	46	15	31	.326	12	

=== Statistical leaders ===
Batting leaders
Stat	Player (Note: Minimum 2.7 PAs per team game. Correct as of 27 January 2013.)	Team	Total
AVG	Adam Buschini	Canberra Cavalry	.363
HR	Adam Buschini	Canberra Cavalry	15
RBI	Adam Buschini	Canberra Cavalry	50
R	Adam Buschini Kody Hightower	Canberra Cavalry	37
H	Mitch Dening	Sydney Blue Sox	59
SB	Zachary Penprase	Sydney Blue Sox	16

Pitching leaders
Stat	Player (Note: Minimum 0.8 IP per team game. Correct as of 27 January 2013.)	Team	Total
W	Craig Anderson	Sydney Blue Sox	8
L	Paul Mildren	Adelaide Bite	7
ERA	Craig Anderson	Sydney Blue Sox	2.10
K	Chris Oxspring	Sydney Blue Sox	86
IP	Craig Anderson	Sydney Blue Sox	81 1/3
SV	Matthew Williams	Sydney Blue Sox	15

=== All-Star Game ===
2012 ABL All-Star Game
	1	2	3	4	5	6	7	8	9	R	H	E
World All-Stars	0	0	2	0	0	2	0	0	0	4	5	2
Team Australia	0	3	1	0	2	0	0	0	X	6	9	1
- Date: 16 December 2012
- Venue: Melbourne Ballpark
- City: Melbourne
- MVP: Brad Harman
- Attendance: 1,669

The 2012 Australian Baseball League All-Star Game, known as the 2012 ConocoPhillips Australia ABL All-Star Game due to naming rights sponsorship from ConocoPhillips, was the second exhibition game held by the Australian Baseball League (ABL) between Team Australia and a team of World All-Stars. The game was held on Sunday, 16 December 2012 at Melbourne Ballpark in Melbourne, Victoria, the new home of the Melbourne Aces. The players involved were selected from the rosters of the six ABL teams, with players not eligible for selection in the Australian team for international tournaments eligible for the World All-Stars.

==== Starting lineups ====
World All-Stars starters
Order	Player	Team	Position
1	Kody Hightower	Cavalry	SS
2	Carlo Testa	Aces	RF
3	Jeremy Barnes	Cavalry	3B
4	Ji-Man Choi	Bite	1B
5	Jack Murphy	Cavalry	C
6	Zachary Penprase	Blue Sox	2B
7	Ryan Stovall	Cavalry	LF
8	Shota Nakata	Cavalry	DH
9	Hirotoshi Onaka	Bandits	CF

World All-Stars reserves
Player	Team	Position
Cody Clark	Bandits	C
K.C. Hobson	Cavalry	DH

World All-Stars Pitchers
Player	Team
Virgil Vasquez	Heat
Brian Grening	Cavalry
Anthony Claggett	Heat
Zachary Fuesser	Bite
Kevin Reese	Aces
Seon Gi Kim	Bite
Hirotaka Koishi	Aces
Tyler Herr	Blue Sox
Zachary Arneson	Aces

Team Australia starters
Order	Player	Team	Position
1	Elliot Biddle	Aces	DH
2	Chris Snelling	Blue Sox	RF
3	Mitch Dening	Blue Sox	CF
4	Justin Huber	Aces	1B
5	Stefan Welch	Bite	3B
6	Brad Harman	Aces	SS
7	Allan de San Miguel	Heat	C
8	Joshua Roberts	Bandits	LF
9	Scott Wearne	Aces	2B

Team Australia reserves
Player	Team	Position
Darryl George	Aces	1B
Aaron Sayers	Aces	SS
Ryan Battaglia	Bandits	C
Ryan Dale	Aces	2B

Team Australia Pitchers
Player	Team
Paul Mildren	Bite
Shane Lindsay	Aces
Ryan Rowland-Smith	Blue Sox
Chris Oxspring	Blue Sox
Tim Atherton	Blue Sox
Brendan Wise	Heat
Daniel McGrath	Aces
John Hussey	Aces
Kyle Perkins	Cavalry

==== Box score ====
16 December 2012 14:00 at Melbourne Ballpark, Melbourne, Victoria
Team	1	2	3	4	5	6	7	8	9	R	H	E
World All-Stars	0	0	2	0	0	2	0	0	0	4	5	2
Team Australia	0	3	1	0	2	0	0	0	X	6	9	1
WP: S. Lindsay LP: B. Grening Sv: K. Perkins; Home runs: WAS: - AUS: B. Harman (1), A. de San Miguel (1); Attendance: 1,669; Boxscore

== Postseason ==
The 2013 Australian Baseball League (ABL) postseason was held from 2 to 9 February 2013. It was scheduled to start on 1 February, but the first game of the preliminary final series was postponed due to wet weather, and was the first game of a doubleheader the following day. The postseason was contested by three of the six teams participating in the regular season, with the teams with the best winning percentages qualifying.

The preliminary final series was hosted by the Sydney Blue Sox at Blue Sox Stadium in Sydney, against the Perth Heat. The Heat won the series two games to nil, to then face the Canberra Cavalry at Narrabundah Ballpark in Canberra in the championship series. Canberra defeated Perth two games to nil to win their first ABL championship and be awarded the Claxton Shield. It was the first time a team from the Australian Capital Territory won the Claxton Shield

=== Format ===
At the conclusion of the regular season, the postseason will involve the teams in a two-round structure. Each round will consist of a best-of-three-game series between the respective teams. The first-placed team will directly qualify for the championship series, and the second- and third-placed teams will play each other in the preliminary final series, the winner of which will qualify for the second place in the championship series.

=== Bracket ===
Preliminary Final Series; 2 February 2013			Championship Series; 8-9 February 2013
			1	Canberra Cavalry	2
2	Sydney Blue Sox	0	WP	Perth Heat	0
3	Perth Heat	2

==== Qualification ====
The Sydney Blue Sox were the first team to clinch a postseason berth, when they defeated the Brisbane Bandits in the first game of their second series at Blue Sox Stadium in Sydney, the final series of the regular season. In the second game of the same series the following night, the Blue Sox clinched a home postseason series by beating the Bandits again. The Canberra Cavalry clinched their first ABL postseason berth that same night, when they defeated the Adelaide Bite at Norwood Oval in Adelaide. The win also guaranteed a regular season finish no lower than second, and like the Blue Sox assured the Cavalry oh hosting a home postseason series.

The final makeup of the postseason bracket was not determined until the final day of the regular season. The Cavalry guaranteed themselves first place and a place in the championship series when they beat the Bite in their final game. This win also confirmed the Blue Sox would finish in second place and host the preliminary final series. The Perth Heat qualified for the final postseason position when they defeated the Melbourne Aces at Baseball Park in Perth in their final game. The win eliminated the Bandits from contention.

=== Preliminary final ===
The Sydney Blue Sox hosted the Perth Heat in the preliminary final series at Blue Sox Stadium. The Blue Sox and Heat split their season series 4–4. The four-game series played in Sydney in November 2012 was also split 2–2. Over the three ABL seasons played up until this series, Perth has the better record head-to-head against Sydney, with a record of 18–9. The two teams have met in one postseason series before, in the 2011 major semi-final: the Perth Heat won the series 2–0 in Sydney.

Head-to-head record: Perth Heat v Sydney Blue Sox
Game type	Games played	Perth won	Sydney won
Overall	27	18	9
In Sydney	14	12	2
In 2012–13 season	8	4	4
In Postseason	2	2	0

The first game of the series was scheduled to be played on 1 February, but was postponed due to wet weather. It was rescheduled to be the first game of a doubleheader the following day.

==== Game 1 ====
2 February 2013 15:30 (UTC+11:00) at Blue Sox Stadium, Sydney
Team	1	2	3	4	5	6	7	8	9	R	H	E
Perth Heat	0	1	0	0	0	0	3	0	0	4	10	0
Sydney Blue Sox	0	0	0	0	1	0	0	0	0	1	9	0
WP: Anthony Claggett (1–0) LP: Wayne Lundgren (0–1) Sv: Brendan Wise (1); Attendance: 794; Boxscore

==== Game 2 ====
2 February 2013 19:30 (UTC+11:00) at Blue Sox Stadium, Sydney
Team	1	2	3	4	5	6	7	8	9	R	H	E
Perth Heat	2	0	4	2	0	0	0	0	0	8	14	1
Sydney Blue Sox	0	2	0	0	0	0	0	1	3	6	10	1
WP: Warwick Saupold (1–0) LP: Brad Thomas (0–1) Sv: Brendan Wise (2); Home runs: PER: Timothy Kennelly (1), Allan de San Miguel (1); SYD: None; Attendance: 1,212; Boxscore

=== Championship series ===
The Canberra Cavalry will host the Perth Heat in the championship series at Narrabundah Ballpark. The Cavalry won their season series against the Heat 6–2. The four-game series played in Canberra in January 2013 was won by Canberra 3–1. Over the three ABL seasons played up until this series, Canberra has the better record head-to-head against Perth, with a record of 13–12. The two teams have not previously met in a postseason series; Canberra qualified for the postseason for the first time in 2013.

Head-to-head record: Canberra Cavalry v Perth Heat
Game type	Games played	Canberra won	Perth won
Overall	25	13	12
In Canberra	13	7	6
In 2012–13 season	8	6	2
In Postseason	0	–	–

==== Game 1 ====
8 February 2013 19:00 (UTC+11:00) at Narrabundah Ballpark, Canberra
Team	1	2	3	4	5	6	7	8	9	R	H	E
Perth Heat	0	0	0	0	0	0	0	2	2	4	8	1
Canberra Cavalry	1	3	0	2	0	0	0	0	X	6	12	2
WP: Brian Grening (1–0) LP: Anthony Claggett (1–1) Sv: Sean Toler (1); Home runs: PER: Timothy Kennelly (1), Luke Hughes (1); CAN: Aaron Sloan (1), Ryan Stovall (1); Attendance: 2,013; Boxscore

==== Game 2 ====
9 February 2013 19:00 (UTC+11:00) at Narrabundah Ballpark, Canberra
Team	1	2	3	4	5	6	7	8	9	R	H	E
Perth Heat	2	0	0	0	4	0	0	0	0	6	8	2
Canberra Cavalry	1	4	1	0	0	0	1	0	X	7	13	0
WP: Brodie Downs (1–0) LP: Jack Frawley (0–1) Sv: Sean Toler (2); Home runs: PER: None; CAN: Kody Hightower (1), Michael Wells (1); Attendance: 2,043; Boxscore

== Awards ==
Player of the Week award winners
Round	Player	Team
1	K.C. Hobson	Canberra Cavalry
2	Elliot Biddle	Melbourne Aces
3	Carlo Testa	Melbourne Aces
4	Cody Clark	Brisbane Bandits
5	Angus Roeger	Adelaide Bite
6	Justin Howard	Adelaide Bite
7	Kody Hightower	Canberra Cavalry
8	Ji-Man Choi	Adelaide Bite
9	Ryan Stovall	Canberra Cavalry
10	Adam Buschini	Canberra Cavalry
11	C.J. Beatty	Brisbane Bandits
12	Trent D'Antonio	Sydney Blue Sox
13	Adam Buschini	Canberra Cavalry

Pitcher of the Week award winners
Round	Player	Team
1	Chris Oxspring	Sydney Blue Sox
2	Chris Oxspring	Sydney Blue Sox
3	Chris Smith	Brisbane Bandits
4	Chris Oxspring	Sydney Blue Sox
5	Anthony Claggett	Perth Heat
6	Sean Toler	Canberra Cavalry
7	Chris Smith	Brisbane Bandits
8	Craig Anderson	Sydney Blue Sox
9	Chris Smith	Brisbane Bandits
10	Adam Bright	Melbourne Aces
11	Matthew Williams	Sydney Blue Sox
12	Dushan Ruzic	Adelaide Bite
13	Jack Frawley	Perth Heat
