= 2012–13 Canberra Cavalry season =

2012–13 Canberra Cavalry
- Claxton Shield champions
- Minor premiership
- League: Australian Baseball League
- Ballpark: Narrabundah Ballpark
- City: Canberra, Australian Capital Territory
- Record: 27–19 (.587)
- Place: 1st
- Owner: ABL
- General manager: Peter Bishell
- Manager: Steve Schrenk

The 2012–13 Canberra Cavalry season will be the third season for the team. As was the case for the previous season, the Cavalry will compete in the Australian Baseball League (ABL) with the other five foundation teams, and will again play its home games at Narrabundah Ballpark.

== Regular season ==
=== Standings ===
Pos	Team	Pld	W	L	PCT	GB	Qualification
**1**	Canberra Cavalry	**46**	**27**	**19**	.587	—	**Advance to Championship Series**
2	Sydney Blue Sox	45	26	19	.578	0.5	Advance to Preliminary final
3	Perth Heat	46	25	21	.543	2	Advance to Preliminary final
4	Brisbane Bandits	45	23	22	.511	3.5	
5	Adelaide Bite	46	21	25	.457	6	
6	Melbourne Aces	46	15	31	.326	12	

==== Record vs opponents ====
Opponent	W–L Record	Largest Victory			Largest Defeat			Current Streak
Opponent	W–L Record	Score	Date	Ground	Score	Date	Ground	Current Streak
Adelaide Bite	3–1	8–2	30 November 2012	Narrabundah Ballpark	7–6	1 December 2012	Narrabundah Ballpark	2W
Brisbane Bandits	1–1	2–3	16 November 2012	John Murray Field	1–0	17 November 2012	John Murray Field	1L
Melbourne Aces	5–3	9–1	13 December 2012	Melbourne Ballpark	0–5	14 December 2012	Melbourne Ballpark	2W
Perth Heat	–	–			–			
Sydney Blue Sox	4–3	6–2	8 December 2012	Blue Sox Stadium	2–3	2 November 2012	Narrabundah Ballpark	2W
Total	13–8	Melbourne Aces			Melbourne Aces			2W
Total	13–8	9–1	13 December 2012	Melbourne Ballpark	0–5	14 December 2012	Melbourne Ballpark	2W

=== Game log ===
W	Cavalry win
L	Cavalry loss
T	Cavalry tie
	Game postponed
**Bold**	Cavalry team member

2012–13 Game Log
November

#	Date	Opponent	Score	Win	Loss	Save	Crowd	Record	Ref
1	2 November	Blue Sox	2–3	T. Van Steensel	**E. Massingham**	M. Williams	1,812	0–1	
2	3 November (DH 1)	Blue Sox	1–2	V. Harris	**K. Perkins**	M. Williams	-	0–2	
3	3 November (DH 2)	Blue Sox	2–1	**D. Loggins**	C. Anderson	**S. Toler**	1,291	1–2	
4	16 November	@ Bandits	3–2	**B. Grening**	J. Staatz	**S. Toler**	537	2-2	
5	17 November (DH 1)	@ Bandits	0–1	C. Smith	**R. Dickmann**		613	2–3	
6	17 November (DH 2)	@ Bandits	1–6 (after 3 innings)						
7	23 November	Aces	3–5	Z. Arneson	**D. Loggins**	J. Hussey	1,155	2–4	
8	24 November (DH 1)	Aces	10–9	**K. Perkins**	H. Koishi	**S. Tole**		3–4	
9	24 November (DH 2)	Aces	5–3	**M. Fujihara**	D. McGrath	**D. Loggins**	1,503	4-4	
10	25 November	Aces	7–8	A. Blackley	**J. Holdzkom**	J. Hussey	980	4–5	
11	30 November	Bite	8–2	**B. Grening**	P. Mildren		1,128	5-5	

December

#	Date	Opponent	Score	Win	Loss	Save	Crowd	Record	Ref
12	1 December (DH 1)	Bite	6–7	R. Olson	**S. Kent**	A. Kittredge		5–6	
13	1 December (DH 2)	Bite	6–3	**R. Dickmann**	D. Fidge	**S. Toler**	1,112	6-6	
14	2 December	Bite	4–2	**E. Massingham**	D. Ruzic	**S. Toler**	703	7–6	
15	6 December	@ Blue Sox	2–1	**E. Massingham**	T. Van Steensel	**S. Toler**	689	8–6	
16	7 December	@ Blue Sox	3–4	C. Anderson	**R. Dickmann**	M. Williams	872	8–7	
17	8 December	@ Blue Sox	6–2	**C. Motta**	T. Cox		1,305	9–7	
18	9 December	@ Blue Sox	7–6	**D. Loggins**	T. Van Steensel	**S. Toler**	1,165	10–7	
19	13 December	@ Aces	9–1	**B. Grening**	K. Reese		632	11–7	
20	14 December (DH 1)	@ Aces	0–5	H. Koishi	**R. Dickmann**			11–8	
21	14 December (DH 2)	@ Aces	9–8	**S. Toler**	Y. Nakazaki		1,136	12–8	
22	15 December	@ Aces	5–0	**J. Holdzkom**	S. Gibbons		223	13–8	
23	20 December	Bandits	–						
24	21 December	Bandits	–						
25	22 December	Bandits	–						
26	23 December	Bandits	–						
27	28 December	@ Heat	–						
28	29 December	@ Heat	–						
29	30 December	@ Heat	–						
30	31 December	@ Heat	–						

January

#	Date	Opponent	Score	Win	Loss	Save	Crowd	Record	Ref
31	3 January	Heat	–						
32	4 January	Heat	–						
33	5 January	Heat	–						
34	6 January	Heat	–						
35	11 January	@ Bandits	–						
36	12 January (DH 1)	@ Bandits	–						
37	12 January (DH 2)	@ Bandits	–						
38	13 January	@ Bandits	–						
39	17 January	Blue Sox	–						
40	18 January	Blue Sox	–						
41	19 January	Blue Sox	–						
42	20 January	Blue Sox	–						
43	24 January	@ Bite	–						
44	25 January	@ Bite	–						
45	26 January	@ Bite	–						
46	27 January	@ Bite	–						

== Roster ==
Canberra Cavalry roster – 2012–13 ABL
Active roster		Inactive roster	Coaching staff
Pitchers Right-handed pitchers: 41 (Australia) Brian Grening; ? (United States) John Holdzkom; 45 (United States) Dustin Loggins; 33 (United States) Eric Massingham; 25 (United States) Chris Motta; 11 (Australia) Kyle Perkins; 34 (Japan) Hirokazu Shiranita; 48 (United States) Sean Toler; Left-handed pitchers: 36 (United States) Robert Dickmann; 14 (Japan) Masanori Fujihara	Catchers: 50 (United States) Jack Murphy; Infielders: 20 (United States) Jeremy Barnes; 40 (United States) Adam Buschini; 5 (Australia) Kody Hightower; 46 (United States) K.C. Hobson; 43 (Australia) Josh Matavesi; 3 (United States) Ryan Stovall; 26 (Australia) Michael Wells; Outfielders: 28 (United States) Antonio Callaway; 4 (Canada) Marcus Knecht; 15 (Japan) Kohei Shibata; 2 (Australia) Ben Warner	Pitchers; Right Handed Pitchers: 17 (Australia) Hayden Beard; 47 (United States) Chris Coleman; ? (Australia) Michael Lennox; Left Handed Pitchers: 23 (Australia) Steven Kent; 21 (Australia) Chris Morgan; Catchers: 22 (United States) Adam Jacobs; 9 (Australia) Robbie Perkins; 38 (Australia) Aaron Sloan; Infielders: 4 (Australia) Lee Mills; Outfielders: 30 (United States) Jonathan Jones	Manager: -- (Australia) Michael Collins; Coaches: -- (Australia) Clayton McCullough (Coach); 26 (Australia) Michael Wells (Coach)
Correct as of 9 December 2012.
