= 2012–13 Perth Heat season =

2012–13 Perth Heat
- League: Australian Baseball League
- Ballpark: Barbagallo Ballpark
- City: Perth, Western Australia
- Record: 25–21 (.543)
- Place: 3rd
- Owner: ABL
- General manager: Alex Pellerano
- Manager: Brooke Knight
- Radio: 91.3 SportFM

The 2012–13 Perth Heat season will be the third season for the team. The Heat will once again compete in the Australian Baseball League (ABL) with the other five foundation teams, and will again play its home games at Barbagallo Ballpark.

The Heat will also be defending the ABL Championship title, having won the previous season's Championship Series, and over the course of the season, will represent Australia in the 2012 Asia Series.

== Offseason ==
In 2012, for the second consecutive year, the Heat will represent Australia in the Asia Series, a round-robin tournament of champion teams from the baseball leagues of Asia, including representatives of Japan, Republic of Korea, Republic of China and, going forward, People's Republic of China. The Heat qualified as winners of the 2012 ABL Championship Series. To date, the Heat is the only team to represent Australia in the Asia Series.

== Regular season ==
=== Standings ===
Pos	Team	Pld	W	L	PCT	GB	Qualification
1	Canberra Cavalry	46	27	19	.587	—	Advance to Championship Series
2	Sydney Blue Sox	45	26	19	.578	0.5	**Advance to Preliminary final**
**3**	Perth Heat	**46**	**25**	**21**	.543	**2**	**Advance to Preliminary final**
4	Brisbane Bandits	45	23	22	.511	3.5	
5	Adelaide Bite	46	21	25	.457	6	
6	Melbourne Aces	46	15	31	.326	12	

==== Record vs opponents ====
Opponent	W–L Record	Largest Victory			Largest Defeat			Current Streak
Opponent	W–L Record	Score	Date	Ground	Score	Date	Ground	Current Streak
Adelaide Bite	3–0	13–3	2 November 2012	Norwood Oval	–			3W
Brisbane Bandits	2–2	3–2; 4-3	8 December 2012; 8 December 2012	Barbagallo Ballpark	1–5	9 December 2012	Barbagallo Ballpark	1L
Canberra Cavalry	–	–			–			
Melbourne Aces	5–2	8–0	1 December 2012	Melbourne Ballpark	2–12	18 November	Barbagallo Ballpark	2W
Sydney Blue Sox	2–2	6–4	24 November 2012	Blue Sox Stadium	2–4	23 November 2012	Blue Sox Stadium	2W
Total	12-6	Adelaide Bite			Melbourne Aces			1L
Total	12-6	13-3	2 November 2012	Norwood Oval	2–12	18 November 2012	Barbagallo Ballpark	1L

=== Game log ===
W	Heat win
L	Heat loss
T	Heat tie
	Game postponed
**Bold**	Heat team member

2012–13 Game Log
November

#	Date	Opponent	Score	Win	Loss	Save	Crowd	Record	Ref
1	1 November	@ Bite	9–3	**V. Vasquez**	Z. Fuesser		874	1-0	
2	2 November	@ Bite	13–3	**A. Claggett**	P. Mildren		1,454	2-0	
3	3 November	@ Bite	8–4	**D. Schmidt**	R. Olson		1,578	3-0	
4	16 November	Aces	3–0	**V. Vasquez**	K. Reese		1,507	4-0	
5	17 November	Aces	9–4	**A. Claggett**	H. Koishi		1,619	5-0	
6	18 November	Aces	2–12	S. Gibbons	**S. Mitchinson**		1,189	5-1	
7	22 November	@ Blue Sox	0–1	M. Williams	**B. Wise**		845	5-2	
8	23 November	@ Blue Sox	2–4	T. Atherton	**A. Claggett**	M. Williams	1,065	5-3	
9	24 November	@ Blue Sox	6–4	**S. Mitchinson**	V. Harris	**C. Lamb**	1,609	6-3	
10	25 November	@ Blue Sox	4–3	**D. Schmidt**	T. Cox	**B. Wise**	1,202	7-3	
11	30 November	@ Aces	9-2	**V. Vasquez**	K. Reese		584	8-3	

December

#	Date	Opponent	Score	Win	Loss	Save	Crowd	Record	Ref
12	1 December (DH 1)	@ Aces	1–3	H. Koishi	**S. Mitchinson**	J. Hussey		8-4	
13	1 December (DH 2)	@ Aces	8–0	**A. Claggett**	S. Gibbons		1,135	9-4	
14	2 December	@ Aces	4–3	**D. Schmidt**	A. Blackley	**C. Lamb**	407	10-4	
15	7 December	Bandits	4–6	C. Lofgren	**V. Vasquez**	R. Searle	1,303	10-5	
16	8 December (DH 1)	Bandits	3–2	**S. Mitchinson**	C. Smith	**C. Lamb**		11-5	
17	8 December (DH 2)	Bandits	4–3	**M. Zachary**	J. Erasmus	**W. Saupold**	1,748	12-5	
18	9 December	Bandits	1–5	J. Kilby	**D. Schmidt**		1,359	12-6	
19	13 December	Blue Sox	–						
20	14 December (DH 1)	Blue Sox	–						
21	14 December (DH 2)	Blue Sox	–						
22	15 December	Blue Sox	–						
23	21 December	@ Bite	–						
24	22 December (DH 1)	@ Bite	–						
25	22 December (DH 2)	@ Bite	–						
26	23 December	@ Bite	–						
27	28 December	Cavalry	–						
28	29 December	Cavalry	–						
29	30 December	Cavalry	–						
30	31 December	Cavalry	–						

January

#	Date	Opponent	Score	Win	Loss	Save	Crowd	Record	Ref
31	3 January	@ Cavalry	–						
32	4 January	@ Cavalry	–						
33	5 January	@ Cavalry	–						
34	6 January	@ Cavalry	–						
35	10 January	Bite	–						
36	11 January	Bite	–						
37	12 January	Bite	–						
38	13 January	Bite	–						
39	18 January	@ Bandits	–						
40	19 January (DH 1)	@ Bandits	–						
41	19 January (DH 1)	@ Bandits	–						
42	20 January	@ Bandits	–						
43	24 January	Aces	–						
44	25 January	Aces	–						
45	26 January	Aces	–						
46	27 January	Aces	–						

== Roster ==
Perth Heat roster – 2012–13 ABL
Roster		Inactive Roster	Coaching Staff
Pitchers Right-handed pitchers: 28 (United States) Anthony Claggett; 32 (Australia) Benn Grice; -- (United States) Lucas Irvine; 23 (Australia) Tim Kennelly; 9 (Australia) Cameron Lamb; 38 (Australia) Adam Millson; 35 (Australia) Scott Mitchinson; -- (Australia) Todd Murphy; -- (United States) Jay Pacella; 30 (Australia) Warwick Saupold; 19 (Australia) Robert Sorensen; 44 (United States) Virgil Vasquez; 6 (Australia) Dean White; 14 (Australia) Matt Zachary; Left-handed pitchers: 13 (Australia) Liam Baron; 26 (Australia) Daniel Schmidt	Catchers: 11 (Australia) Allan de San Miguel; -- (Australia) Josh Kennelly; 7 (Australia) Matt Kennelly; 37 (United States) Michael Ohlman; Infielders: 31 (United States) Carter Bell; 3 (Australia) Aaron Bonomi; 10 (Australia) Lachlan Dale; 16 (Australia) Luke Hughes; -- (Australia) Josh McGee; Outfielders: 5 (Australia) Corey Adamson; -- (United States) Steven Bumbry; -- (Australia) Adam Courcha; 33 (Australia) Elliot Hargreaves; -- (United States) Adam Melker; 8 (Australia) Graeme Scorer	Pitchers: -- (Australia) Liam Hendriks; 21 (Australia) Brendan Wise; Infielders: -- (Australia) Sam Kennelly; Outfielders: -- (Australia) Ben Shorto	Manager: 17 (United States) Steven Fish; Coaches: 44 (Australia) Greg Jelks (Hitting Coach); 27 (Australia) Graeme Lloyd (Pitching Coach); 25 (Australia) Rick Steven (First Base Coach)
Correct as of 22 October 2012.
