= 2012–13 Adelaide Bite season =

2012–13 Adelaide Bite
- League: Australian Baseball League
- Ballpark: Coopers Stadium
- City: Adelaide, South Australia
- Record: 21–25 (.457)
- Place: 5th
- Owner: ABL
- General manager: Pat Kelly
- Manager: Tony Harris
- Television: In-House Broadcast

The 2012–13 Adelaide Bite season is the third season for the team. As was the case for the previous seasons, the Bite will compete in the Australian Baseball League (ABL) with the other five foundation teams, and is expected to again play its home games at Coopers Stadium.

== Regular season ==
=== Standings ===
| Pos | Team | Pld | W | L | PCT | GB | Qualification |
|---|---|---|---|---|---|---|---|
| 1 | Canberra Cavalry | 46 | 27 | 19 | .587 | — | Advance to Championship Series |
| 2 | Sydney Blue Sox | 45 | 26 | 19 | .578 | 0.5 | Advance to Preliminary final |
| 3 | Perth Heat | 46 | 25 | 21 | .543 | 2 | Advance to Preliminary final |
| 4 | Brisbane Bandits | 45 | 23 | 22 | .511 | 3.5 | |
| **5** | Adelaide Bite | **46** | **21** | **25** | .457 | **6** | |
| 6 | Melbourne Aces | 46 | 15 | 31 | .326 | 12 | |

==== Record vs opponents ====
| Opponent | W–L Record | Largest Victory | | | Largest Defeat | | | Current Streak |
| Opponent | W–L Record | Score | Date | Ground | Score | Date | Ground | Current Streak |
|---|---|---|---|---|---|---|---|---|
| Brisbane Bandits | 2–2 | 5–2 | 24 November 2012 | Norwood Oval | 2–6 & 3–7 | 22 & 24 November 2012 | Norwood Oval | 1L |
| Canberra Cavalry | 1–3 | 6–7 | 1 December 2012 | Narrabundah Ballpark | 2–8 | 30 November 2012 | Narrabundah Ballpark | 2L |
| Melbourne Aces | 5–2 | 18–1 | 8 December 2012 | Norwood Oval | 2–7 | 11 November 2012 | Melbourne Ballpark | 4W |
| Perth Heat | 0–3 | – | | | 3–13 | 2 November 2012 | Norwood Oval | 3L |
| Sydney Blue Sox | – | – | | | – | | | |
| Total | 8–10 | Melbourne Aces | | | Perth Heat | | | 4W |
| Total | 8–10 | 18–1 | 8 December 2012 | Norwood Oval | 3–13 | 2 November 2012 | Norwood Oval | 4W |

=== Game log ===
| W | Bite win |
| L | Bite loss |
| T | Bite tie |
| | Game postponed |
| **Bold** | Bite team member |

2012–13 Game Log
November

| # | Date | Opponent | Score | Win | Loss | Save | Crowd | Record | Ref |
|---|---|---|---|---|---|---|---|---|---|
| 1 | 1 November | Heat | 3–9 | V. Vasquez | **Z. Fuesser** | N/A | 874 | 0-1 | Archived 3 March 2016 at the Wayback Machine |
| 2 | 2 November | Heat | 3–13 | A. Claggett | **P. Mildren** | | 1,454 | 0-2 | |
| 3 | 3 November | Heat | 4–8 | D. Schmidt | **R. Olson** | | 1,578 | 0-3 | Archived 3 March 2016 at the Wayback Machine |
| 4 | 9 November | @ Aces | 1-5 | J. Hussey | **R. Olsen** | | 1,116 | 0-4 | Archived 3 March 2016 at the Wayback Machine |
| 5 | 10 November | @ Aces | 4-0 | **Z. Fuesser** | H. Koishi | | 1,228 | 1-4 | Archived 3 March 2016 at the Wayback Machine |
| 6 | 11 November | @ Aces | 2–7 | S. Gibbons | **P. Mildren** | | 296 | 1-5 | Archived 3 March 2016 at the Wayback Machine |
| 7 | 22 November | Bandits | 2–6 | J. Staatz | **D. Ruzic** | | 795 | 1-6 | Archived 10 June 2015 at the Wayback Machine |
| 8 | 23 November | Bandits | 7–6 | **Z. Fuesser** | J. Albury | **A. Kittredge** | 2,125 | 2-6 | Archived 10 June 2015 at the Wayback Machine |
| 9 | 24 November (DH 1) | Bandits | 5–2 | **D. Fidge** | C. Smith | **A. Kittredge** | | 3-6 | Archived 10 June 2015 at the Wayback Machine |
| 10 | 24 November (DH 2) | Bandits | 3–7 | R. Searle | **W. Lee** | | 1,345 | 3-7 | Archived 10 June 2015 at the Wayback Machine |
| 11 | 30 November | @ Cavalry | 2–8 | B. Grening | **P. Mildren** | | 1,128 | 3-8 | Archived 18 December 2013 at the Wayback Machine |

December

| # | Date | Opponent | Score | Win | Loss | Save | Crowd | Record | Ref |
|---|---|---|---|---|---|---|---|---|---|
| 12 | 1 December (DH 1) | @ Cavalry | 7–6 | **R. Olson** | S. Kent | **A. Kittredge** | | 4-8 | Archived 18 December 2013 at the Wayback Machine |
| 13 | 1 December (DH 2) | @ Cavalry | 3–6 | R. Dickmann | **D. Fidge** | S. Toler | 1,112 | 4-9 | Archived 18 December 2013 at the Wayback Machine |
| 14 | 2 December | @ Cavalry | 2–4 | E. Massingham | **D. Ruzic** | S. Toler | 703 | 4-10 | Archived 18 December 2013 at the Wayback Machine |
| 15 | 7 December | Aces | 10–4 | **R. Olson** | Y. Nakazaki | | 936 | 5-10 | Archived 3 March 2016 at the Wayback Machine |
| 16 | 8 December (DH 1) | Aces | 5–3 | **A. Kittredge** | A. Blackley | | - | 6-10 | Archived 3 March 2016 at the Wayback Machine |
| 17 | 8 December (DH 2) | Aces | 18–1 | **P. Mildren** | S. Gibbons | | 1,504 | 7-10 | Archived 3 March 2016 at the Wayback Machine |
| 18 | 9 December | Aces | 9–8 | **R. Olson** | Z. Arneson | | 545 | 8-10 | Archived 3 March 2016 at the Wayback Machine |
| 19 | 13 December | @ Bandits | – | | | | | | |
| 20 | 14 December (DH 1) | @ Bandits | – | | | | | | |
| 21 | 14 December (DH 2) | @ Bandits | – | | | | | | |
| 22 | 15 December | @ Bandits | – | | | | | | |
| 23 | 21 December | Heat | – | | | | | | |
| 24 | 22 December (DH 1) | Heat | – | | | | | | |
| 25 | 22 December (DH 2) | Heat | – | | | | | | |
| 26 | 23 December | Heat | – | | | | | | |
| 27 | 27 December | @ Blue Sox | – | | | | | | |
| 28 | 28 December | @ Blue Sox | – | | | | | | |
| 29 | 29 December | @ Blue Sox | – | | | | | | |
| 30 | 30 December | @ Blue Sox | – | | | | | | |

January

| # | Date | Opponent | Score | Win | Loss | Save | Crowd | Record | Ref |
|---|---|---|---|---|---|---|---|---|---|
| 31 | 3 January | Blue Sox | – | | | | | | |
| 32 | 4 January | Blue Sox | – | | | | | | |
| 33 | 5 January (DH 1) | Blue Sox | – | | | | | | |
| 34 | 5 January (DH 2) | Blue Sox | – | | | | | | |
| 35 | 10 January | @ Heat | – | | | | | | |
| 36 | 11 January | @ Heat | – | | | | | | |
| 37 | 12 January | @ Heat | – | | | | | | |
| 38 | 13 January | @ Heat | – | | | | | | |
| 39 | 17 January | @ Aces | – | | | | | | |
| 40 | 18 January | @ Aces | – | | | | | | |
| 41 | 19 January | @ Aces | – | | | | | | |
| 42 | 20 January | @ Aces | – | | | | | | |
| 43 | 24 January | Cavalry | – | | | | | | |
| 44 | 25 January | Cavalry | – | | | | | | |
| 45 | 26 January | Cavalry | – | | | | | | |
| 46 | 27 January | Cavalry | – | | | | | | |

== Roster ==
Adelaide Bite roster – 2012-13 ABL
| Active roster | | Inactive roster | Coaching Staff |
| Pitchers Right-handed pitchers: 18 (United States) Reed Brown; 20 (Australia) Adam Crabb; 14 (Australia) Darren Fidge; 24 (Australia) Chris Lawson; 16 (Australia) Dakota Mitchell; 31 (Australia) Steven O'Connor; 33 (Australia) Wayne Ough; 38 (Australia) Dushan Ruzic; 29 (United States) Jandy Sena; Left-handed pitchers: 26 (Australia) Wilson Lee; 8 (Australia) Jackson Lodge; 25 (Australia) Paul Mildren; 11 (India) Rinku Singh | Catchers: 9 (Australia) Chris Adamson; 7 (Australia) Ben Lodge; 19 (Australia) Tom McGarry; Infielders: 6 (Australia) Josh Cakebread; 17 (Australia) Dennis Christiansen; 1 (Australia) Jeremy Creswell; 4 (Australia) Mathew Smith; 22 (Australia) Stefan Welch; Outfielders | Pitchers: -- (United States) Zachary Fuesser; -- (South Korea) Seon-gi Kim; -- (Australia) Andrew Kittredge; -- (Australia) Richard Olson; -- (United States) Aaron Pribanic; Catchers: -- (United States) Josiah Atkins; -- (Australia) Dylan Child; -- (Australia) Troy Weinert; Infielders: -- (South Korea) Ji-man Choi; -- (Australia) Nathan VanDerLinden; Outfielders: -- (United States) Justin Howard; -- (United States) Nathan Melendres; -- (Australia) Angus Roeger | Manager: 2 (Australia) Tony Harris; Coaches: 30 (Australia) Warwick Marks (Pitching Coach); 17 (Australia) Nathan Davidson (Coach); 10 (Australia) Mark Haylock (Coach); 28 (Australia) Craig Watts (Coach) |
Current as of 2 November 2012.
