= 2012–13 Melbourne Aces season =

2012–13 Melbourne Aces
- League: Australian Baseball League
- Ballpark: Melbourne Ballpark
- City: Melbourne, Victoria
- Record: 15–31 (.326)
- Place: 6th
- Owner: ABL
- General manager: Windsor Knox
- Manager: Phil Dale
- Radio: Aussie Digital

The 2012–13 Melbourne Aces season will be the third season for the team. As was the case for the previous season, the Aces will compete in the Australian Baseball League (ABL) with the other five foundation teams, and for the first time, the team will play its home games at the Melbourne Ballpark.

== Offseason ==
During the offseason, the Aces announced that they were moving their home games from the Melbourne Showgrounds to the Melbourne Ballpark in Altona, Victoria. The Ballpark, which also hosted Melbourne-based teams in the previous incarnation of the league, will undergo significant improvements before the opening of the season, including the adjustment of fences, and the installation of an open-air beer garden.

== Regular season ==
=== Standings ===
Pos	Team	Pld	W	L	PCT	GB	Qualification
1	Canberra Cavalry	46	27	19	.587	—	Advance to Championship Series
2	Sydney Blue Sox	45	26	19	.578	0.5	Advance to Preliminary final
3	Perth Heat	46	25	21	.543	2	Advance to Preliminary final
4	Brisbane Bandits	45	23	22	.511	3.5	
5	Adelaide Bite	46	21	25	.457	6	
**6**	Melbourne Aces	**46**	**15**	**31**	.326	**12**	

==== Record vs opponents ====
Opponent	W–L Record	Largest Victory			Largest Defeat			Current Streak
Opponent	W–L Record	Score	Date	Ground	Score	Date	Ground	Current Streak
Adelaide Bite	4–7	8–2	18 January 2013	Melbourne Ballpark	1–18	8 December 2012	Norwood Oval	4L
Brisbane Bandits	5–3	6–1	3 January 2013	Melbourne Ballpark	1–6	30 December 2012	Brisbane Exhibition Ground	4W
Canberra Cavalry	3–5	5–0	14 December 2012	Melbourne Ballpark	1–9	13 December 2012	Melbourne Ballpark Ballpark	2L
Perth Heat	2–9	12–2	18 November 2012	Barbagallo Ballpark	1–11	27 January 2013	Barbagallo Ballpark	6L
Sydney Blue Sox	1–7	1–0	21 December 2012	Melbourne Ballpark	3–13	10 January 2013	Blue Sox Stadium	6L
Total	15–31	Perth Heat			Adelaide Bite			6L
Total	15–31	12–2	18 November 2012	Barbagallo Ballpark	1–18	8 December 2012	Norwood Oval	6L

=== Game log ===
W	Aces win
L	Aces loss
T	Aces tie
	Game postponed
**Bold**	Aces team member

2012–13 Game Log
November

#	Date	Opponent	Score	Win	Loss	Save	Crowd	Record	Ref
1	9 November	Bite	5–1	**J. Hussey**	R. Olsen		1,116	1-0	
2	10 November	Bite	0–4	Z. Fuesser	**H. Koishi**		1,228	1-1	
3	11 November	Bite	7–2	**S. Gibbons**	P. Mildren		296	2-1	
4	16 November	@ Heat	0–3	V. Vasquez	**K. Reese**		1,507	2-2	
5	17 November	@ Heat	4–9	A. Claggett	**H. Koishi**		1,619	2-3	
6	18 November	@ Heat	12–2	**S. Gibbons**	S. Mitchinson		1,189	3-3	
7	23 November	@ Cavalry	5–3	**Z. Arneson**	D. Loggins	**J. Hussey**	1,155	4-3	
8	24 November (DH 1)	@ Cavalry	9–10	K. Perkins	**H. Koishi**	S. Tole		4-4	
9	24 November (DH 2)	@ Cavalry	3–5	M. Fujihara	**D. McGrath**	D. Loggins	1,503	4-5	
10	25 November	@ Cavalry	8–7	**A. Blackley**	J. Holdzkom	**J. Hussey**	980	5-5	
11	30 November	Heat	2-9	V. Vasquez	**K. Reese**		584	5-6	

December

#	Date	Opponent	Score	Win	Loss	Save	Crowd	Record	Ref
12	1 December (DH 1)	Heat	3–1	**H. Koishi**	S. Mitchinson	**J. Hussey**		6-6	
13	1 December (DH 2)	Heat	0–8	A. Claggett	**S. Gibbons**		1,135	6-7	
14	2 December	Heat	3–4	D. Schmidt	**A. Blackley**	C. Lamb	407	6-8	
15	7 December	@ Bite	4–10	R. Olson	**Y. Nakazaki**		936	6-9	
16	8 December (DH 1)	@ Bite	3–5	A. Kittredge	**A. Blackley**		-	6-10	
17	8 December (DH 2)	@ Bite	1–18	P. Mildren	**S. Gibbons**		1,504	6-11	
18	9 December	@ Bite	8–9	R. Olson	**Z. Arneson**		545	6-12	
19	13 December	Cavalry	1–9	B. Grening	**K. Reese**		632	6-13	
20	14 December (DH 1)	Cavalry	5–0	**H. Koishi**	R. Dickmann			7-13	
21	14 December (DH 2)	Cavalry	8–9	S. Toler	**Y. Nakazaki**		1,136	7-14	
22	15 December	Cavalry	0–5	J. Holdzkom	**S. Gibbons**		223	7-15	
23	20 December	Blue Sox	1–5	C. Anderson	**K. Reese**		334	7-16	
24	21 December	Blue Sox	1–0	**H. Koishi**	C. Oxspring	**C. Forbes**	234	8-16	
25	22 December	Blue Sox	3–4	T. Herr	**A. Blackley**	M. Williams	424	8-17	
26	23 December	Blue Sox	8–10	T. Herr	**C. Forbes**	M. Williams	270	8-18	
27	27 December	@ Bandits	1–5	C. Lofgren	**J. Hussey**		569	8-19	
28	28 December	@ Bandits	0–4	C. Smith	**K. Reese**		614	8-20	
29	29 December	@ Bandits	5–3	**C. Forbes**	K. Maso		2,056	9-20	
30	30 December	@ Bandits	1–6	J. Schult	**J. Kennedy**		644	9-21	

January

#	Date	Opponent	Score	Win	Loss	Save	Crowd	Record	Ref
31	3 January	Bandits	6–1	**K. Reese**	C. Lofgren		586	10-21	
32	4 January	Bandits	7–3	**J. Hussey**	T. Tetsuya	**C. Forbes**	421	11-21	
33	5 January	Bandits	2–0	**A. Bright**	R. Searle	**Z. Arneson**	902	12-21	
34	6 January	Bandits	5–4	**M. Hodge**	N. Crawford		621	13-21	
35	10 January	@ Blue Sox	3–13	C. Oxspring	**M. Hodge**		912	13-22	
36	11 January	@ Blue Sox	0–2	C. Anderson	**J. Hussey**	M. Williams	1,274	13-23	
37	12 January	@ Blue Sox	4–5	B. Thomas	**A. Bright**	M. Williams	1,570	13-24	
38	13 January	@ Blue Sox	1–4	T. Atherton	**A. Blackley**	M. Williams	1,008	13-25	
39	17 January	Bite	3–2	**J. Hussey**	Z. Fuesser	**T. Blackley**	764	14-25	
40	18 January	Bite	8–2	**K. Reese**	S. Kim		1,143	15-25	
41	19 January	Bite	6–12	R. Olson	**A. Bright**		1,411	15-26	
42	20 January	Bite	0–9	D. Ruzic	**A. Blackley**		1,144	15-27	
43	24 January	@ Heat	3–4	B. Wise	**Z. Arneson**		1,447	15-28	
44	25 January	@ Heat	3–11	W. Saupold	**K. Reese**		2,073	15-29	
45	26 January	@ Heat	2–6	D. Schmidt	**J. Kennedy**		1,303	15-30	
46	27 January	@ Heat	1–11	J. Frawley	**B. Cunningham**		1,893	15-31	

== Roster ==
Melbourne Aces roster – 2012–13 ABL
Active roster		Inactive roster	Coaching Staff
Pitchers Right-handed pitchers: 13 (United States) Bubbie Buzachero; 17 (Australia) Sam Gibbons; 34 (Australia) John Hussey; 32 (Australia) Andrew Mann; 28 (United States) Kevin Reese; Left-handed pitchers: 22 (Australia) Adam Blackley; 11 (Australia) Adam Bright; 45 (Australia) Jon Kennedy; 1 (Japan) Hirotaka Koishi; 6 (Australia) Daniel McGrath; 5 (Japan) Yuta Nakazaki; ? (Australia) Matt Wilson	Catchers: 30 (Australia) Liam Bedford; 27 (Japan) Shota Nakata; 62 (Australia) Jarryd Rogers; Infielders: 37 (Australia) Ryan Dale; 12 (Australia) Josh Davies; 16 (Australia) Darryl George; 8 (Australia) Brad Harman; 46 (Australia) Joshua Hendricks; 6 (Australia) Aaron Sayers; 7 (Australia) Scott Wearne; ? (Japan) Hyunki Yun; Outfielders: 33 (Australia) Elliot Biddle; 26 (Australia) Justin Huber; 44 (United States) Carlo Testa	Pitchers: _{Left Handed Pitchers}; 18 (Australia) Dean McIntyre; ? (Australia) Lewis Thorpe; _{Right Handed Pitchers}; 47 (United States) Zachary Arneson; 41 (Australia) Cameron Forbes; 41 (Australia) Alex Da Silva; ? (Australia) Campbell Wiggins; Catchers: Nil; Infielders: 35 (Australia) Nicholas Spence; Outfielders: 40 (Australia) John Edwards; ? (Australia) Ben Leslie	Manager: 43 (Australia) Phil Dale; Coaches: 19 (Australia) Phil Allen (Hitting Coach); 33 (Australia) Russ Spear (Pitching Coach); -- (Australia) Stephen Black(Coach); -- (Australia) Neil Burke(Coach); -- (Australia) Mitsuharu Nagayama(Coach); -- (Australia) Jonathan Schuerholz(Coach); 20 (Australia) Damian Shanahan (Coach)
Current as of 4 December 2012.
