= 2012–13 Brisbane Bandits season =

2012–13 Brisbane Bandits
- League: Australian Baseball League
- Ballpark: Brisbane Exhibition Ground
- City: Brisbane, Queensland
- Record: 23–22 (.511)
- Place: 4th
- Owner: ABL
- General manager: Paul Gonzalez
- Manager: Kevin Jordan
- Television: In-House Broadcast

The 2012–13 Brisbane Bandits season will be the third season for the team. As was the case for the previous season, the Bandits will compete in the Australian Baseball League (ABL) with the other five foundation teams, and will again play its home games at the Brisbane Exhibition Ground.

== Regular season ==
=== Standings ===
Pos	Team	Pld	W	L	PCT	GB	Qualification
1	Canberra Cavalry	46	27	19	.587	—	Advance to Championship Series
2	Sydney Blue Sox	45	26	19	.578	0.5	Advance to Preliminary final
3	Perth Heat	46	25	21	.543	2	Advance to Preliminary final
**4**	Brisbane Bandits	**45**	**23**	**22**	.511	**3.5**	
5	Adelaide Bite	46	21	25	.457	6	
6	Melbourne Aces	46	15	31	.326	12	

==== Record vs opponents ====
Opponent	W–L Record	Largest Victory			Largest Defeat			Current Streak
Opponent	W–L Record	Score	Date	Ground	Score	Date	Ground	Current Streak
Adelaide Bite	2–2	6–2 & 7–3	22 & 24 November 2012	Norwood Oval	2–5	24 November 2012	Norwood Oval	1W
Canberra Cavalry	1–1	1–0	17 November 2012	John Murray Field	2-3	16 November 2012	John Murray Field	1W
Melbourne Aces	–	–			–			
Perth Heat	2–2	5–1	9 December 2012	Barbagallo Ballpark	2–3; 3-4	8 December 2012; 8 December 2012	Barbagallo Ballpark	1W
Sydney Blue Sox	3–4	5–2	11 November 2012	Blue Sox Stadium	0–8	9 November 2012	Blue Sox Stadium	2L
Total	8-9	Perth Heat			Sydney Blue Sox			1W
Total	8-9	5-1	9 December 2012	Barbagallo Ballpark	0-8	9 November 2012	Blue Sox Stadium	1W

=== Game log ===
W	Bandits win
L	Bandits loss
T	Bandits tie
	Game postponed
**Bold**	Bandits team member

2012–13 Game Log
November

#	Date	Opponent	Score	Win	Loss	Save	Crowd	Record	Ref
1	9 November	@ Blue Sox	0–8	C. Oxspring	**J. Staatz**	-	815	0-1	
2	10 November	@ Blue Sox	3–1	**J. Erasmus**	T. Van Steensel	-	1,180	1-1	
3	11 November	@ Blue Sox	5–2	**C. Smith**	V. Harris	**J. Veitch**	821	2-1	
4	16 November	Cavalry	2–3	B. Grening	**J. Staatz**	S. Toler	537	2-2	
5	17 November (DH 1)	Cavalry	1–0	**C. Smith**	R. Dickmann		613	3-2	
6	18 November (DH 2)	Cavalry	6–1 (after 3 innings)						
7	22 November	@ Bite	6–2	**J. Staatz**	D. Ruzic		795	4-2	
8	23 November	@ Bite	6–7	Z. Fuesser	**J. Albury**	A. Kittredge	2,125	4-3	
9	24 November (DH 1)	@ Bite	2–5	D. Fidge	**C. Smith**	A. Kittredge		4-4	
10	24 November (DH 2)	@ Bite	7–3	**R. Searle**	W. Lee		1,345	5-4	
11	30 November	Blue Sox	3–8	C. Oxspring	**C. Lofgren**		432	5-5	

December

#	Date	Opponent	Score	Win	Loss	Save	Crowd	Record	Ref
12	1 December (DH 1)	Blue Sox	3–2	**J. Erasmus**	W. Lundgren	**R. Searle**		6-5	
13	1 December (DH 1)	Blue Sox	2–3	C. Anderson	**J. Erasmus**	M. Williams	481	6-6	
14	2 December	Blue Sox	2–9	T. Cox	**J. Staatz**		666	6-7	
15	7 December	@ Heat	6–4	**C. Lofgren**	V. Vasquez	**R. Searle**	1,303	7-7	
16	8 December (DH 1)	@ Heat	2–3	S. Mitchinson	**C. Smith**	C. Lamb		7-8	
17	8 December (DH 2)	@ Heat	3–4	M. Zachary	**J. Erasmus**	W. Saupold	1,748	7-9	
18	9 December	@ Heat	5–1	**J. Kilby**	D. Schmidt		1,359	8-9	
19	13 December	Bite	–						
20	14 December (DH 1)	Bite	–						
21	14 December (DH 2)	Bite	–						
22	15 December	Bite	–						
23	20 December	@ Cavalry	–						
24	21 December	@ Cavalry	–						
25	22 December	@ Cavalry	–						
26	23 December	@ Cavalry	–						
27	27 December	Aces	–						
28	28 December	Aces	–						
29	29 December	Aces	–						
30	30 December	Aces	–						

January

#	Date	Opponent	Score	Win	Loss	Save	Crowd	Record	Ref
31	3 January	@ Aces	–						
32	4 January	@ Aces	–						
33	5 January	@ Aces	–						
34	6 January	@ Aces	–						
35	11 January	Cavalry	–						
36	12 January (DH 1)	Cavalry	–						
37	12 January (DH 2)	Cavalry	–						
38	13 January	Cavalry	–						
39	18 January	Heat	–						
40	19 January (DH 1)	Heat	–						
41	19 January (DH 2)	Heat	–						
42	20 January	Heat	–						
43	24 January	@ Blue Sox	–						
44	25 January	@ Blue Sox	–						
45	26 January	@ Blue Sox	–						
46	27 January	@ Blue Sox	–						

== Roster ==
Brisbane Bandits roster – 2012–13 ABL
Active roster		Inactive Roster	Coaching Staff
Pitchers Right-handed pitchers: 12 (Australia) James Albury; 15 (Australia) Steven Chambers; 30 (Australia) Nathan Crawford; 36 (South Africa) Justin Erasmus; 10 (Australia) Michael Gahan; 42 (Australia) Jason Kilby; 5 (Australia) Rhys Niit; 22 (Australia) Ryan Searle; 14 (Australia) Chris Smith; 41 (United States) Justin Staatz; 32 (Australia) John Veitch; Left-handed pitchers: 45 (United States) Chuck Lofgren	Catchers: 29 (Australia) Ryan Battaglia; 37 (United States) Cody Clark; Infielders: 23 (Australia) Alan Schoenberger; 43 (Australia) David Sutherland; 17 (Australia) Andrew Campbell; 25 (United States) Carlos Alonso; 16 (Australia) Logan Wade; 26 (Australia) Cory Lyon; 40 (United States) Evan Kohli; 21 (Australia) Brad Dutton; Outfielders: 19 (Australia) Joshua Roberts; 20 (Japan) Hirotoshi Onaka	Pitchers: 24 (Australia) Simon Morriss; 31 (Australia) Aaron Thompson; Catchers: 18 (Australia) Mitch Nilsson; Infielders Outfielders: -- (Australia) Steve Baylis; 27 (Australia) Steven Greer; -- (United States) C.J. Beatty	Manager: 11 (Australia) Kevin Jordan; Coaches: 37 (Australia) Gary Nilsson (Pitching Coach); -- (Australia) Gareth Jones; 13 (Australia) Shayne Watson (Coach)
Current as of 4 December 2012.
