= Kohei Shibata =

Japanese baseball player

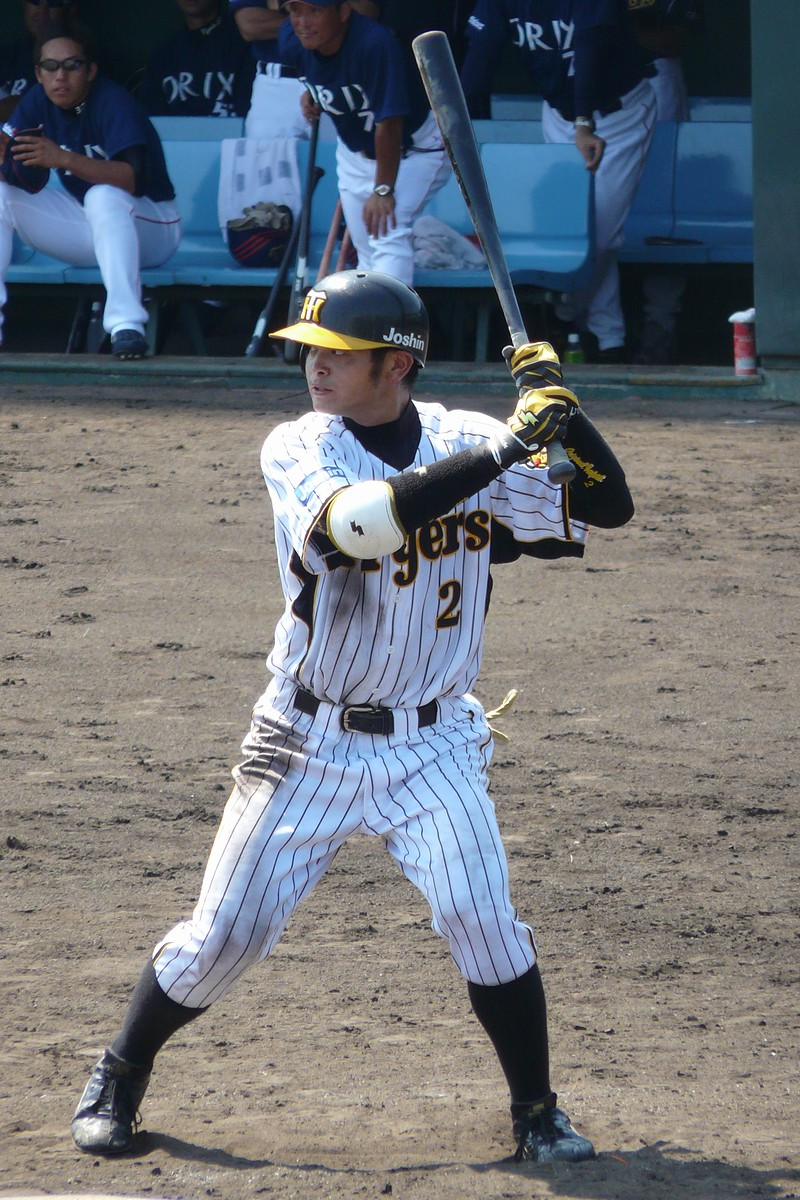
- Shibata with the Hanshin Tigers

Chiba Lotte Marines – No. 00
- Outfielder
- Born: July 17, 1986 (age 40)
- Bats: Left Throws: Left

NPB debut
- 26 September, 2009, for the Hanshin Tigers

NPB statistics (through 2016)
- Batting average: .247
- Home runs: 1
- RBI: 28
- Stats at Baseball Reference

Teams
- Hanshin Tigers (2009–2016); Chiba Lotte Marines (2017)

Kohei Shibata (柴田 講平, Shibata Kōhei; born 17 July 1986) is a Japanese professional baseball outfielder for the Chiba Lotte Marines in Japan's Nippon Professional Baseball. Following a college career that included representing Japan at the 2008 World University Baseball Championship, Shibata was drafted by the Tigers in 2008 and made his first-team debut for the club in the following year. After having regular playing time in the Tigers' first team early in his career, his opportunities have reduced in recent years due to injury and the emergence of younger players.

== Early life ==
Shibata started playing baseball when he was in the fourth grade of elementary school. In junior high school he played for the Yahata Eagles in the Japan Boys League. He attended Fukuoka Jyoto High School and became the starting center fielder for the school's baseball club in the autumn of his second year. In his third year, he helped the school advance to the quarter-finals of the 2004 Japanese High School Baseball Invitational Tournament, playing alongside Takuma Sadaoka and Ken Nishimura.

Shibata attended International Budo University and twice led the Chiba University League in batting average, including a .500 average in the spring 2008 league. In his final year he was selected to represent Japan in the 2008 World University Baseball Championship held in the Czech Republic.

In June 2008 it was reported that the Hanshin Tigers were considering drafting Shibata at the end of the year and he was billed as "Akahoshi Jr." due to his foot speed. Shibata was drafted by the Tigers in the second round of the rookie draft in October 2008. Hiroki Uemoto, who played with Shibata in the Japan representative side, was drafted by the Tigers in the third round, and Shibata's high school teammate Nishimura was selected by the Tigers in the fourth round.

== Professional career ==
=== 2009 ===
Shibata was assigned uniform #2 and was expected to start his rookie season in the first-team squad. However, poor form during the pre-season saw him start the year in the Hanshin farm team in the Western League. He spent the year with the second-team squad, where he registered a .320 batting average in 76 games and was selected for the Western League's all-star team. He was called up to Hanshin's first-team squad on 26 September and made his debut on the same day against the Chunichi Dragons, entering the game as a pinch runner and grounding out in his only at bat. In seven games for the first team he failed to record a safe hit in five at bats, although he batted in one run with a sacrifice fly.

=== 2010 ===
During the off-season Shibata gave up uniform #2 for Kenji Johjima, who joined Hanshin from the Seattle Mariners; Shibata took uniform #00 that was previously worn by the retiring Shuta Tanaka. In February 2010 Shibata suffered a broken bone in his hand during a practice match against the Hokkaido Nippon Ham Fighters, but recovered in time for the opening match of the Western league season on April 10. His unremarkable performance for the farm team coupled with Hanshin's strong batting lineup meant he was not called up to the first team at any time during the year.

=== 2011 ===
Shibata started the 2011 in the first-team squad, competing against Shunsuke Fujikawa for the starting centerfield position. In the first half of the year Shibata was mainly used as a pinch runner and to strengthen the team's defence late in games. However, in the second half of the year he replaced Fujikawa as the starting centerfielder and batted second in the lineup. He appeared in a total of 104 matches and had a batting average of .271.

=== 2012 ===
Shibata started the 2012 season as the starting centerfielder and early in the season appeared as the starter against right-handed pitchers, with Yamato Maeda starting matches against left-handers. However his batting struggled compared to Maeda, hitting only .223 in his first 45 games. He started matches less as the year progressed, with stints in the farm team also. He finished the year with 73 first-team appearances and a batting average of .234. He spent part of the off-season with the Canberra Cavalry in the Australian Baseball League with Hanshin teammates Masanori Fujihara and Hirokazu Shiranita.

=== 2013 ===
Shibata's opportunities to play in Hanshin's first team were reduced in 2013 due to Matt Murton, Maeda and Kosuke Fukudome forming a stable outfield lineup, however he was called up to the first team in May after Fukudome suffered an injury. On May 22, in his second start of the year, he hit his first career home run against the Chiba Lotte Marines at Chiba Marine Stadium. On 3 June, in a match against the Fukuoka SoftBank Hawks in his native Fukuoka Prefecture and with his family in the stands, he batted in the game winning runs and was recognized with his first solo post-match "hero interview". Whilst enjoying his career-best batting average of .297, Shibata injured his foot sliding into second base on a steal and was removed from the first-team roster the following day. He was unable to make his return to the first-team roster until September and finished the year with a batting average of .229 in 36 games.

=== 2014 ===
In 2014 Shibata only appeared in 27 first-team games and his batting average fell to .179. For Hanshin's farm team he batted .257 in 59 games. At the end of the season his contract salary for the following year was reduced 13% to 10 million yen.

=== 2015 ===
Shibata's opportunities remained limited in 2015 due to the emergence of young outfielders Hayata Ito and Taiga Egoshi. He finished the season having appeared in only 20 first-team games and batting .190. He fared better in the Western league however, hitting two home runs and batting with an average of .352 in 60 games.

== Playing style ==
Whilst in university Shibata was noted for his foot speed (50m in 5.7 seconds) and ability to throw long distances (110m). Early in his career he was noted for "hitting whatever came", but adapted to the variation used by professional pitchers after receiving advice from the Hanshin batting coaches. He has also been described as having "baseball smarts" that complement his speed. In the 2013–14 and 2014–15 off seasons he had personal training sessions with Major League player Nori Aoki, a fellow left-handed outfielder; Shibata has said he is trying to learn from Aoki and adopt his style.

== Personal life ==
Shibata married a 24-year-old woman in June 2012 and their first daughter was born in June 2013.
