= 2012–13 Sydney Blue Sox season =

2012–13 Sydney Blue Sox
- League: Australian Baseball League
- Ballpark: Blacktown International Sportspark Sydney
- City: Blacktown, New South Wales
- Record: 26–19 (.578)
- Place: 2nd
- Owner: ABL
- General manager: David Balfour
- Manager: Glenn Williams
- Radio: Triple H FM

The 2012–13 Sydney Blue Sox season was the third season for the team. As was the case for the previous season, the Blue Sox competed in the Australian Baseball League (ABL) with the other five foundation teams, and again played its home games at Blacktown International Sportspark Sydney.

== Regular season ==
=== Standings ===
Pos	Team	Pld	W	L	PCT	GB	Qualification
1	Canberra Cavalry	46	27	19	.587	—	Advance to Championship Series
**2**	Sydney Blue Sox	**45**	**26**	**19**	.578	**0.5**	**Advance to Preliminary final**
3	Perth Heat	46	25	21	.543	2	**Advance to Preliminary final**
4	Brisbane Bandits	45	23	22	.511	3.5	
5	Adelaide Bite	46	21	25	.457	6	
6	Melbourne Aces	46	15	31	.326	12	

==== Record vs opponents ====
Opponent	W–L Record	Largest Victory			Largest Defeat			Current Streak
Opponent	W–L Record	Score	Date	Ground	Score	Date	Ground	Current Streak
Adelaide Bite	4-4	4-0	30 December 2012	Blue Sox Stadium	4-9	5 January 2013	Diamond Sports Stadium	L2
Brisbane Bandits	6-4	13-0	25 January 2013	Blue Sox Stadium	2–5	11 November 2012	Blue Sox Stadium	L1
Canberra Cavalry	5-6	12-8	17 January 2013	Narrabundah Ballpark	2–6	8 December 2012	Blue Sox Stadium	L1
Melbourne Aces	7-1	13-3	10 January 2013	Blue Sox Stadium	0-1	21 December 2012	Melbourne Ballpark	W6
Perth Heat	4–4	5–2	13 December 2012	Baseball Park	2-10	14 December 2012	Baseball Park	L1
Total	26–19	Brisbane Bandits			Brisbane Bandits			L1
Total	26–19	13–0	25 January 2013	Blue Sox Stadium	2–10	14 December 2012	Baseball Park	L1

=== Game log ===
W	Blue Sox win
L	Blue Sox loss
T	Blue Sox tie
	Game postponed
**Bold**	Blue Sox team member

2012–13 Game Log
November

#	Date	Opponent	Score	Win	Loss	Save	Record	Ref
1	2 November	@ Cavalry	3–2	**T. Van Steensel**	E. Massingham	**M. Williams**	1-0	
2	3 November (DH 1)	@ Cavalry	2–1	**V. Harris**	K. Perkins	**M. William**	2-0	
3	3 November (DH 2)	@ Cavalry	1–2	D. Loggins	**C. Anderson**	S. Toler	2-1	
4	9 November	Bandits	8–0	**C. Oxspring**	J. Staatz	-	3-1	
5	10 November	Bandits	1-3	J. Erasmus	**T. Van Steensel**	-	3-2	
6	11 November	Bandits	2–5	C. Smith	**V. Harris**	J. Veitch	3-3	
7	22 November	Heat	1–0	**M. Williams**	B. Wise	-	4-3	
8	23 November	Heat	4–2	**T. Atherton**	A. Claggett	**M. Williams**	5-3	
9	24 November	Heat	4–6	S. Mitchinson	**V. Harris**	C. Lamb	5-4	
10	25 November	Heat	3–4	D. Schmidt	**T. Cox**	B. Wise	5-5	
11	30 November	@ Bandits	8–3	**C. Oxspring**	C. Lofgren	-	6-5	

December

#	Date	Opponent	Score	Win	Loss	Save	Record	Ref
12	1 December (DH 1)	@ Bandits	2–3	J. Erasmus	**W. Lundgren**	R. Searle	6-6	
13	1 December (DH 2)	@ Bandits	3–2	**C. Anderson**	J. Erasmus	**M. Williams**	7-6	
14	2 December	@ Bandits	9–2	**T. Cox**	J. Staatz	-	8-6	
15	6 December	Cavalry	1–2	E. Massingham	**T. Van Steensel**	S. Toler	8-7	
16	7 December	Cavalry	4–3	**C. Anderson**	R. Dickmann	**M. Williams**	9-7	
17	8 December	Cavalry	2–6	C. Motta	**T. Cox**	-	9-8	
18	9 December	Cavalry	6–7	D. Loggins	**T. Van Steensel**	S. Toler	9-9	
19	13 December	@ Heat	5-2	**C. Anderson**	V. Vasquez	**M. Williams**	10-9	
20	14 December (DH 1)	@ Heat	2-10	D. Schmidt	**T. Atherton**	-	10-10	
21	14 December (DH 2)	@ Heat	6-4	**C. Oxspring**	A. Claggett	**M. Williams**	11-10	
22	15 December	@ Heat	9-10	G. Van Sickler	**T. Herr**	C. Lamb	11-11	
23	20 December	@ Aces	5-1	**C. Anderson**	K. Reese	-	12-11	
24	21 December	@ Aces	0-1	H. Koishi	**C. Oxspring**	C. Forbes	12-12	
25	22 December	@ Aces	4-3	**T. Herr**	A. Blackley	**M. Williams**	13-12	
26	23 December	@ Aces	10-8	**T. Herr**	C. Forbes	**M. Williams**	14-12	
27	27 December	Bite	7-9	A. Kittredge	**B. Thomas**	R. Olson	14-13	
28	28 December	Bite	3-2	**C. Anderson**	J. Daniels	**M. Williams**	15-13	
29	29 December	Bite	2-1	**W. Lundgren**	P. Mildren	**M. Williams**	16-13	
30	30 December	Bite	4-0	**T. Herr**	A. Kittredge	-	17-13	

January

#	Date	Opponent	Score	Win	Loss	Save	Record	Ref
31	3 January	@ Bite	3-7	Z. Fuesser	**C. Anderson**	-	17-14	
32	4 January	@ Bite	4-3	**T. Van Steensel**	R. Brown	**M. Williams**	18-14	
33	5 January	@ Bite	4-9	P. Mildren	**B. Thomas**	-	18-15	
34	6 January	@ Bite	6-7	R. Olson	**D. Koo**	-	18-16	
35	10 January	Aces	13-3	**C. Oxspring**	M. Hodge	-	19-16	
36	11 January	Aces	2-0	**C. Anderson**	J. Hussey	**M. Williams**	20-16	
37	12 January	Aces	5-4	**B. Thomas**	A. Bright	**M. Williams**	21-16	
38	13 January	Aces	4-1	**T. Atherton**	A. Blackley	**M. Williams**	22-16	
39	17 January	@ Cavalry	12-8	**C. Anderson**	B. Grening	-	23-16	
40	18 January	@ Cavalry	7-8	S. Toler	**D. Koo**	-	23-17	
41	19 January	@ Cavalry	10-2	**B. Thomas**	C. Motta	-	24-17	
42	20 January	@ Cavalry	3-4	D. Loggins	**T. Herr**	-	24-18	
43	24 January	Bandits	6-2	**C. Anderson**	C. Lofgren	-	25-18	
44	25 January	Bandits	13-0	**B. Thomas**	R. Searle	-	26-18	
45	26 January	Bandits	2-4	J. Schult	**C. Oxspring**	J. Erasmus	26-19	
46	27 January	Bandits	PPD - RAIN	-	-	-	-	

== Roster ==
Sydney Blue Sox roster – 2012–13 ABL
Active roster		Reserve players	Coaching staff
Pitchers Right-handed pitchers: 37 (Australia) Tim Atherton; 26 (United States) Caleb Cuevas; 39 (Australia) Josh Guyer; 32 (Australia) Vaughan Harris; 49 (United States) Tyler Herr; 17 (Australia) Wayne Lundgren; 35 (Australia) Chris Oxspring; 21 (Australia) Todd Van Steensel; 26 (Australia) Luke Wilkins; 19 (Australia) Matt Williams; Left-handed pitchers: 31 (Australia) Craig Anderson; 8 (Australia) Timothy Cox; 30 (South Korea) Dae-Sung Koo; 36 (Australia) Brad Thomas	Catchers: 23 (United States) Geoff Klein; Infielders: 4 (Australia) Shane Benson; 11 (Australia) Trent D’Antonio; 5 (Australia) Daniel Glynn; 27 (Australia) Boss Moanaroa; 29 (United States) Zach Penprase; 28 (United States) James Robbins; 42 (Australia) Zac Shepherd; 43 (Australia) Jacob Younis; Outfielders: 47 (South Africa) Alessio Angelucci; 9 (Australia) Mitchell Dening; 25 (Australia) David Kandilas; 3 (Australia) Trent Schmutter; 20 (United States) Chris Snelling; 14 (United States) J.D. Williams	Infielders: — (Australia) Michael Lysaught; Outfielders: 46 (Australia) Ricky Schwarz	Manager: Kevin Boles; Coaches: Chris Oxspring (pitching coach); Glenn Williams; Shaun Smith; Graheme Cassel; Darian Lindsay; : 7-day disabled list : reassigned
5 September 2017
