= Kentaro Kuwahara =

Japanese baseball player

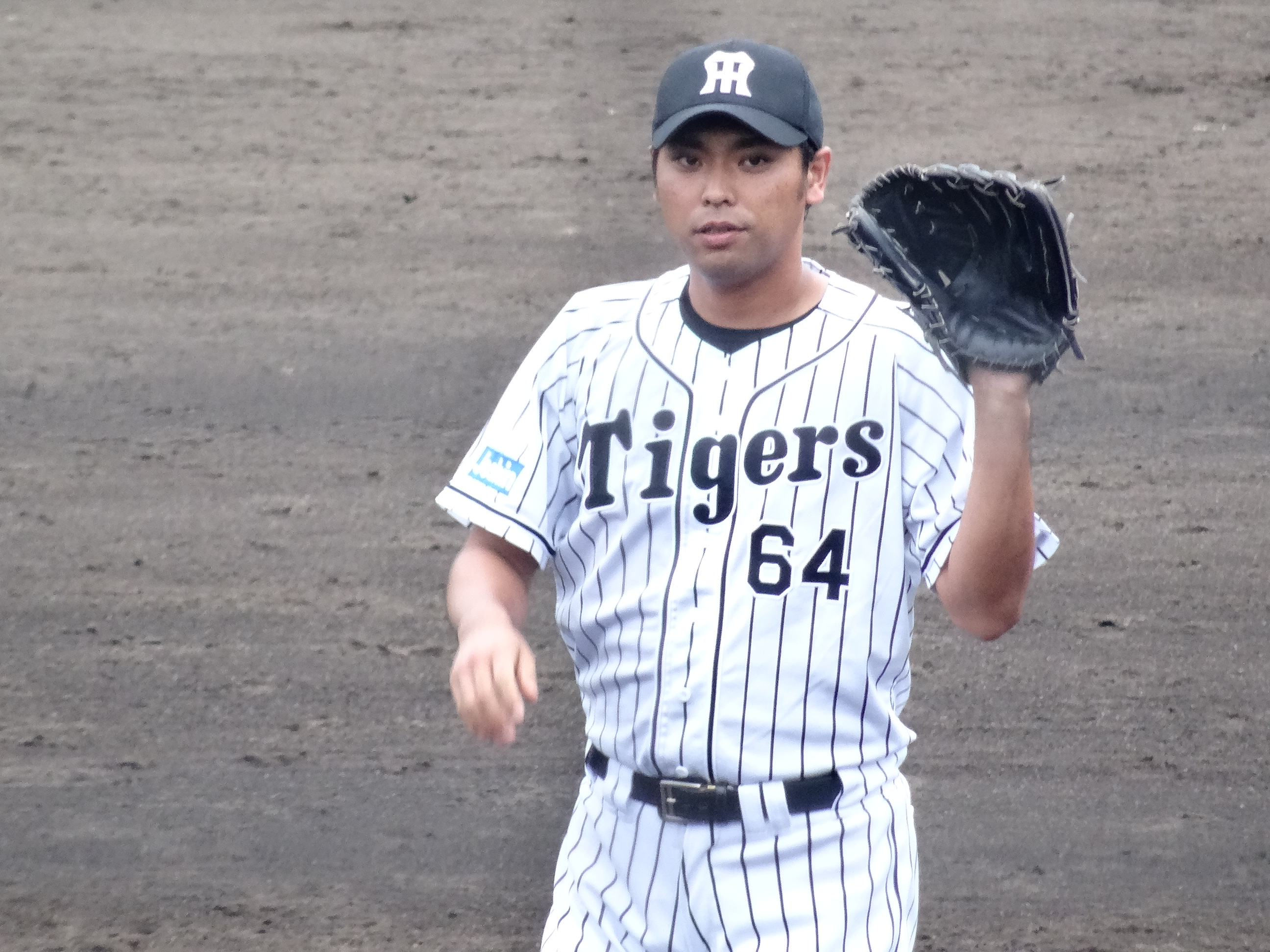
- Kuwahara with the Hanshin Tigers in 2015

Hanshin Tigers – No. 81
- Pitcher / Coach
- Born: October 29, 1985 (age 40)
- Batted: Right Threw: Right

NPB debut
- April 6, 2008, for the Yokohama BayStars

Last NPB appearance
- May 18, 2021, for the Hanshin Tigers

NPB statistics
- Win–loss record: 15–13
- ERA: 3.61
- Strikeouts: 277
- Stats at Baseball Reference

Teams
- As player: Yokohama BayStars (2008–2010); Orix Buffaloes (2011–2014); Hanshin Tigers (2015–2021); As coach: Hanshin Tigers (2026–present)

Career highlights and awards
- Central League Most Valuable Setup pitcher (2017)

Kentaro Kuwahara (桑原 謙太朗, born October 29, 1985) is a Japanese former professional baseball pitcher. He played in Nippon Professional Baseball (NPB) for the Yokohama BayStars from 2008 to 2010, the Orix Buffaloes from 2011 to 2014, and the Hanshin Tigers from 2015 to 2021.

== Early Baseball Career ==
He started playing little league baseball in 4th grade for the Nabari Elementary School in Mie Prefecture. He went on to become the ace of Tsuda Gakuen High, but his school never made it to any national tournaments.

He entered Nara Sangyo University and pitched regularly in the Kinki University Baseball League. In the spring of 2007, he pitched a perfect game against Nara University, earned 6 wins and helped his team win the league championship for the 3rd consecutive tournament. In all his 47 league appearances, he finished with a 26-2 win–loss record, 1.38 ERA and 255 strikeouts, and won one MVP, one Best Pitcher Award, a Fighting Spirit Award (Kantoushou 敢闘賞) and got selected into the Best Nine 3 times.

== Yokohama DeNa Baystars (2008-2010) ==
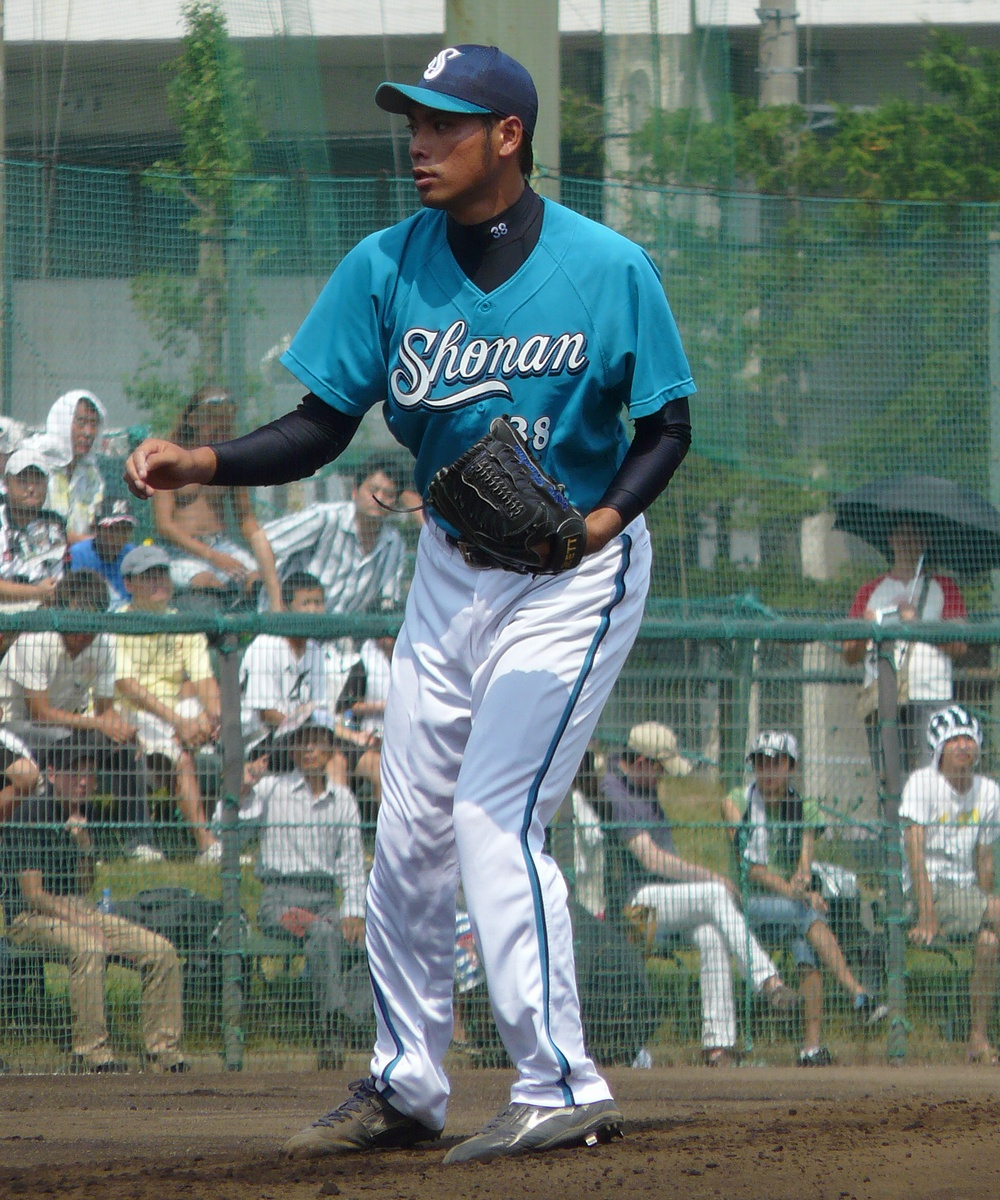
Kuwahara with the BayStars farm team Shonan Searex in 2010

He got selected as the Baystars' 3rd pick during the 2007 NPB professional baseball draft. He inked a 70 million yen contract for a 12 million yen annual salary, and got assigned the jersey number 38.

He debuted as a reliever against the Carps on April 6, 2008. He then alternated as a starter and reliever in his following appearances, and earned his first win on July 9 when he pitched 2 scoreless innings in relief against the Swallows. On August 16, he threw 150 pitches to claim a complete shutout victory against the Tigers in Kyocera Dome. The rest of his outings were not so good however, and he finished the season with 3 wins, 6 losses, 1 hold and a 4.74 ERA. He performed better as a reliever with 2.45 ERA in 20 games, than as a starter with 6.75 ERA in 10 games.

He suffered from an injury during the pre-season games in 2009, and only managed to get back to the main squad in mid-August where he pitched mostly as a reliever thereafter. This role continued in 2010, but his appearances gradually decreased as he fell into a slump. As a result, he and Shingo Nonaka got traded to the Orix Buffaloes for Ikki Shimamura by the end of the 2010 season.

== Orix Buffaloes (2011-2014) ==
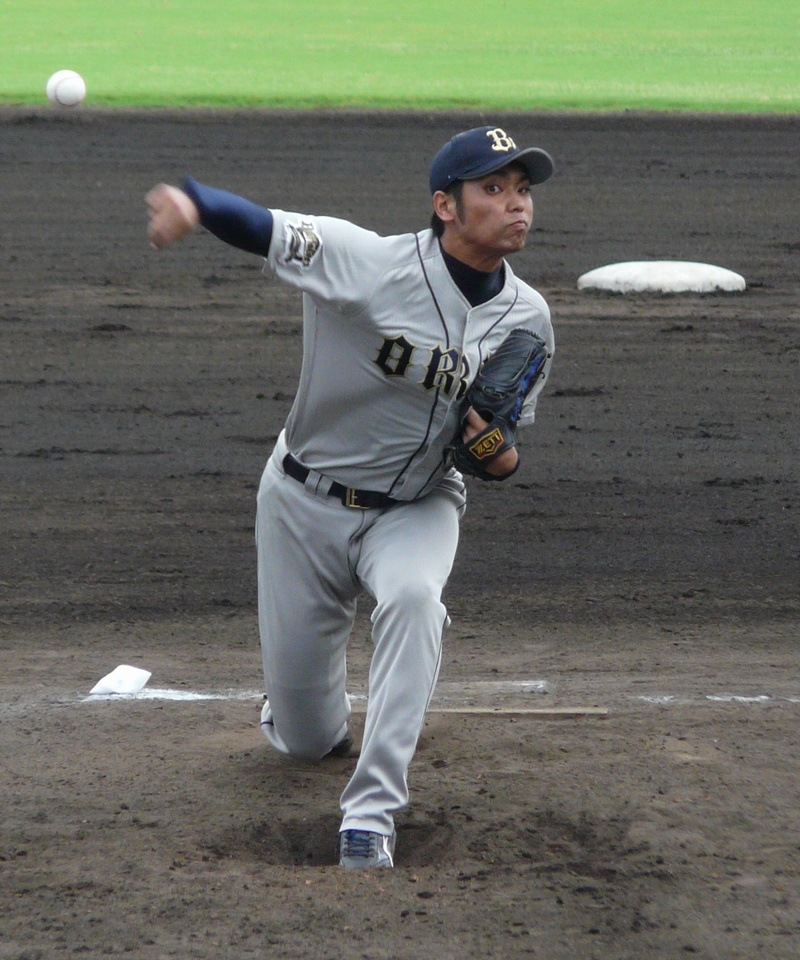
Kuwahara with Orix in 2011

He got 10 appearances in 2011, but recorded no wins and a 3.50 ERA. He spent the next year pitching in the Western League (farm), where he finished with a 5-1 record and 2.61 ERA out of 22 games. He got a handful of appearances with the main squad in the next two seasons, but he spent the majority in the farm. After making just 22 appearances in 4 years for Orix, he was traded to the Hanshin Tigers at the end of the 2014 season for pitcher Hirokazu Shiranita as Orix was short of starters and Hanshin was short of relievers. He inherited Shiranita's former jersey number, 64.

== Hanshin Tigers ==
2015

As soon as he joined the Tigers, his reliever skills were immediately put to the test during the season opening game. But as he continued to give away runs in his next 4 outings, he was eventually sent back to the farm. He had 2 more appearances in May, but he spent the remainder of the season pitching in the Western League games.

2016

He continued to struggle with his pitching and only appeared in a handful of farm games. But after training to adjust his mechanics, he eventually improved and finished the season with a 2.42 ERA out of 29 games (1 win, 3 losses, 2 saves).

2017

His now stable pitching got him through 8 pre-season games with a 1.17 ERA, and earned him a spot in the season opener. Afterwards, he and Marcos Mateo worked together as the main set-up relievers to closer Rafael Dolis during matches where the Tigers have a narrow lead. On the April 5 match against the Swallows, he finally earned his first win as a Tiger, 7 years after he last got one in 2010 from the same opponent. From then onward, he appeared in 16 consecutive games until May 21, and from May 27 until July 18 (including 10 Inter-league games), he pitched in relief for 19 consecutive games without giving away a single run. He finished the season as Hanshin's top reliever with 67 game appearances, 1.51 ERA, 39 holds, 4 wins and 2 losses. He topped the league with 43 holds (tied with Mateo), and together with Iwazaki, Takahashi, Mateo and Doris, they made the Tigers become the first team in NPB history to have five pitchers reach sixty or more appearances in the same season. His overall performance earned him a pay raise that more than quadrupled his previous salary of 8 million yen to 45 million yen. This 463% raise is the largest percentage pay raise ever given to a Japanese player in Tigers history.

2018

He again worked as one of the team's main set-up pitchers in 2018. Although he fared slightly worse than in 2017, he still appeared in 62 games and amassed 32 saves, 5 wins and 3 losses with a 2.68 ERA. Despite the Tigers finishing last in the rankings, he still earned a 15 million pay raise, bringing his annual salary to 60 million yen.

On September 20, 2021, Kuwahara announced that he would be retiring from professional baseball.

== Pitching Style ==
With three quarters delivery, he throws a four-seam fastball up to a speed of 152 km/h (94 mph) and a 150 km/h (93 mph) cutter that sharply changes course just as it approaches the batter. Also included in his arsenal is a 130 km/h (81 mph) slider that follows a large hooking motion.

He struggled with control issues before joining the Tigers, but through the guidance of farm pitching coach Yasuo Kubo, they slowly altered his pitching mechanics during the 2016 season. The training made a drastic improvement in his pitching consistency, and resulted to his breakthrough performance in 2017 and his league topping K/BB ratio in 2018.
