= Paul Mildren =

- Paul Mildren on the mound for the Mudcats
- Pitcher
- Born: 3 May 1984 (age 42); Adelaide, South Australia
- Bats: Right Throws: Left

ABL debut
- 11 November, 2011, for the Adelaide Bite
- Stats at Baseball Reference

Teams
- ABL Teams: Adelaide Bite (2010 - 2013); National Team: Australia (2005 - 2009)

Paul Frank Mildren (born 3 May 1984 in Adelaide, South Australia) is an Australian former professional baseball pitcher. He was 6' 1" tall and weighed 195 lbs.

== Career highlights ==
Mildren was signed by the Florida Marlins as a non-drafted free agent on 19 February 2001. He split 2002 between the Rookie-level Gulf Coast League Marlins and the New York–Penn League Low-A Jamestown Jammers. From 2003 through 2004 he was with the South Atlantic League Single-A Greensboro Bats.

In 2005, he had a stellar year, pitching in the 2005 Baseball World Cup in the Netherlands for the Australia national baseball team, and was awarded the Florida State League Mid-Season All-Star on 18 June 2005, while pitching for the High-A Jupiter Hammerheads. In 2006, Mildren continued his move up the Florida Marlins affiliate system to the Double-A Carolina Mudcats, while also pitching for Australia again in the 2006 World Baseball Classic. With the Mudcats, he went 10–10 with a 4.14 ERA in 28 starts, led all Florida minor leagues in innings pitched, finished second in strikeouts (150), and third in wins, which led to his winning the "Willie Duke Award" as team MVP for the season.

This led to Mildren being assigned to the Florida Marlins 40-man roster in 2007, and being promoted again to the Pacific Coast League Triple-A Albuquerque Isotopes at the beginning of the year. He split the season between the Isotopes and the Omaha Royals when he was claimed by the Kansas City Royals for their 40-man roster, off waivers from the Marlins on 17 August 2007.

Mildren split his season three ways in 2008 pitching relief; first for the Omaha Royals, then the inaugural season of the Texas League Double-A Northwest Arkansas Naturals, and the High-A Wilmington Blue Rocks, ending the 2008 season with a combined ERA of 6.62 over 32 games.

He became a free agent at the end of the 2008 season and signed a minor league contract with the Pittsburgh Pirates in January 2009. 2009 Also noted his second appearance in the World Baseball Classic. Paul completed his 2009 minor league season as a pitcher to the Lynchburg Hillcats in the Class A Advanced Carolina League, and went to Prague as part of the Australian team for the 2009 Baseball World Cup.

== Teaching ==
In 2014, Mildren taught at Magill Primary School.

Since 2015, Mildren has been teaching Physical Education at Glenunga International High School.

He was newly appointed as part of the School Leadership Team at Glenunga International High School.
