= Blue Sox Stadium =

Ballpark in Abilene, Texas

Coordinates: 32.433°N 99.758°W

Blue Sox Stadium was a ballpark located in Abilene, Texas and was the home to the Abilene Blue Sox of the West Texas–New Mexico League (1946–1955) and the Big State League (1956–1957). The park was located on the northeast corner of Barrow and South 14th streets; at the present time, the site is home to the H-E-B grocery store.

The stadium opened in April 1946 to host the Blue Sox and was suitable for night play from its opening date.

== Closure and demolition ==
Repairs were made to the stadium prior to the 1956 season, with new box seats being added along with a new infield.

However, the site of the stadium was purchased and petitioned for re-zoning for the end of the 1957 baseball season. The stadium was razed in September 1957 and replaced with a shopping center.

== Sources ==
- "Texas Almanac 2008–2009", The Dallas Morning News, c.2008
