= Cody Clark (baseball) =

American baseball player (born 1981)

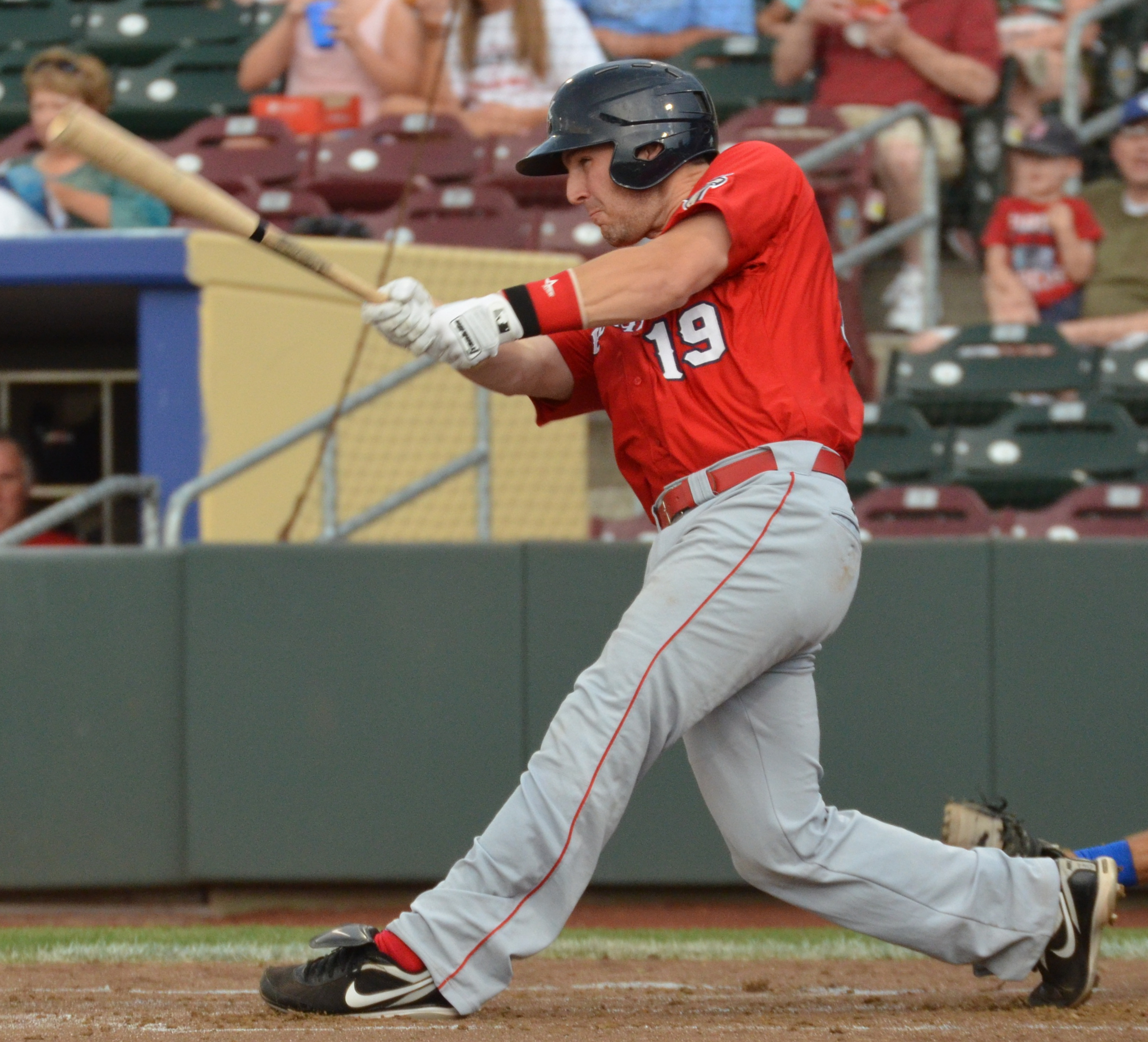
- Clark with the Oklahoma City RedHawks in 2013
- Catcher / Coach
- Born: September 14, 1981 (age 45); Fayetteville, Arkansas, U.S.
- Batted: Right Threw: Right

MLB debut
- August 23, 2013, for the Houston Astros

Last MLB appearance
- September 25, 2013, for the Houston Astros

MLB statistics (through 2013 season)
- Batting average: .105
- Hits: 4
- Home runs: 0
- Runs batted in: 0
- Stats at Baseball Reference

Teams
- As a player: Houston Astros (2013); As a coach: Kansas City Royals (2014–2016)

Career highlights and awards
- World Series champion (2015)

Douglas Cody Clark (born September 14, 1981) is an American professional baseball catcher. He played for the Houston Astros of Major League Baseball during the 2013 season. He is currently an advanced scout for the Kansas City Royals.

== Playing career ==
Clark attended Fayetteville High School in Fayetteville, Arkansas. The Toronto Blue Jays selected Clark in the 48th round of the 2000 Major League Baseball (MLB) Draft, but Clark did not sign. He enrolled at the University of Arkansas and played college baseball for the Arkansas Razorbacks baseball team in 2002 before transferring Wichita State University to play for the Wichita State Shockers baseball team.

=== Texas Rangers ===
The Texas Rangers drafted Clark in the 11th round of the 2003 MLB draft, and he signed.

=== Atlanta Braves ===
Clark played in minor league baseball for the Rangers, then Atlanta Braves, and in independent baseball.

=== Kansas City Royals ===
He signed with the Kansas City Royals organization in 2007. After a disappointing 2008 season in Class AA of the minor leagues, Clark considered retirement. He again considered retiring after the 2012 season.

=== Houston Astros ===
Clark signed with the Houston Astros organization before the 2013 season. The Astros promoted Clark to the major leagues for the first time on August 23, 2013, when they placed Max Stassi on the disabled list. On September 13, 2013, in a game against the Los Angeles Angels, Clark got his first hit in the Major Leagues off of starter Jason Vargas. He was outrighted off the Astros roster on October 2, 2013.

== Coaching career ==
Clark retired after the 2013 season, and joined the Kansas City Royals as their instant replay coordinator for the 2014 season. During the season, he became the Royals' bullpen catcher. After the 2016 season, he was reassigned to a scout.

== Personal ==
Clark's father, Doug, played minor league baseball for the Oakland Athletics' organization. His wife, Jordan, was pregnant with their first child when he was first promoted to the majors.
