= Brendan Wise =

- Pitcher
- Born: 9 January 1986 (age 40); Perth, Australia
- Bats: Left Throws: Right
- Stats at Baseball Reference

Brendan James Wise is an Australian former professional baseball player. He married Janine (Kozlowski) Wise in 2013 and together they have a son, Theodore Thomas, born in May 2020.

== Career ==
Wise started baseball in the US when he went overseas and played at a small Community College and was picked in the 8th round of the 2005 Major League Baseball draft by the Tigers.

For the start of his minor league career with the GCL Tigers he was 2–4 with a 4.87 ERA in 2005. In the 2006 Claxton Shield, he allowed 3 hits and 2 runs in 6^{1/3} innings for his debut for the Perth Heat. In the US, he was 3–6 with a 3.46 ERA for the Oneonta Tigers. He joined the Australian squad in the 2006 Intercontinental Cup, having a 3.86 ERA in three appearances and a save in one outing.

The following year, Wise gave up for three runs in just two innings during the 2007 Claxton Shield. He had a satisfactory minor league season for the Lakeland Flying Tigers with a 3.12 ERA in 31 games and was promoted to the Erie SeaWolves. In the 2007 Baseball World Cup, he appeared in five games, with a 5.40 ERA and allowed one run in three innings in the 2008 Final Olympic Qualification Tournament, where Australia failed to advance to the 2008 Beijing Olympics.

In 2008, Wise pitched for both Lakeland (1–3, 4.64 ERA in 18 games) and Erie (2–1, 3.30 ERA) and helped Perth to win both the 2008 and 2009 Claxton Shield. As of 1 August 2009, he started the season with Lakeland recording 1–1 with a 3.32 ERA before being promoted to Erie, where he is currently a clean 4–0 with a 4.30 ERA. He was also with Australia for the 2009 World Baseball Classic, and again for the 2009 Baseball World Cup.

Wise had a busy start to 2011, debuting on in the Australian Baseball League on 6 January with the Perth Heat against the Sydney Blue Sox where he pitched 1.2 shutout innings to pick up the save. He was shortly after invited to 2011 spring training with the Tigers and will join Sydney's Chris Oxspring.

Since he's inclusion in the team, he has taken over Liam Hendriks role as the closer in the team.
