= Hirokazu Shiranita =

Japanese baseball player

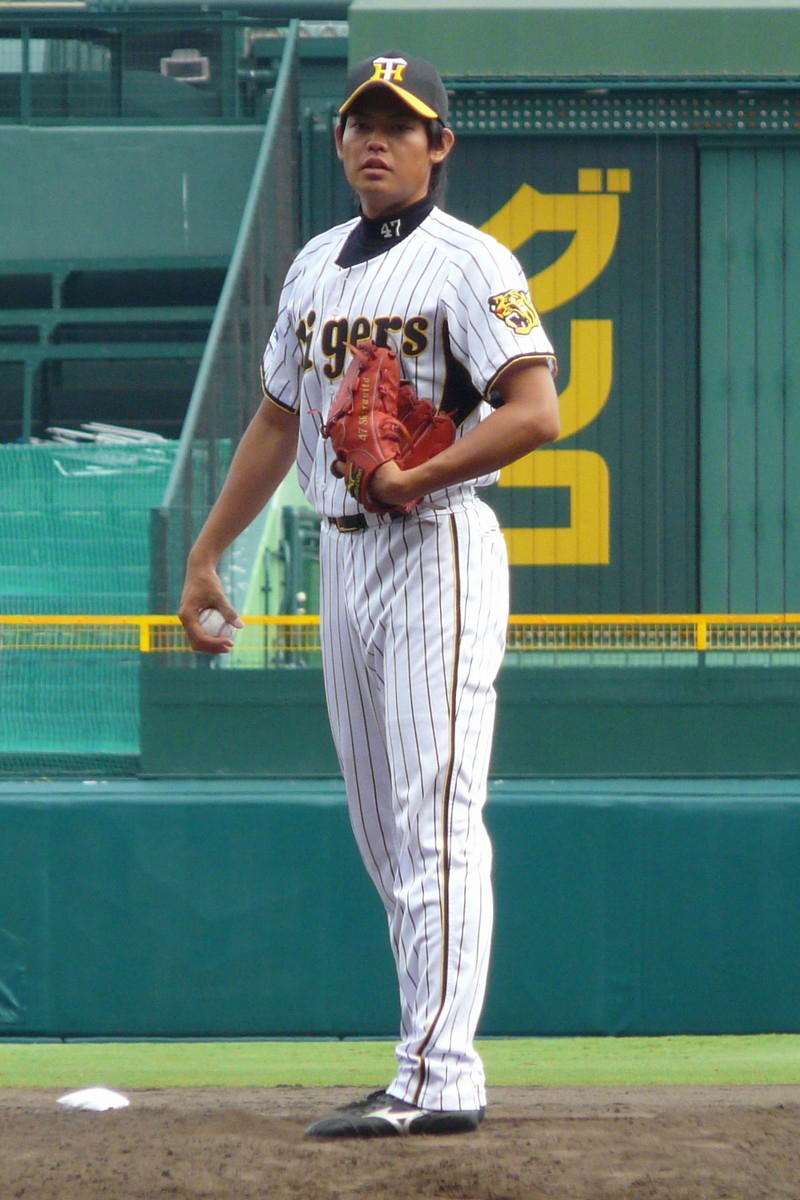
- Shiranita with the Hanshin Tigers
- Pitcher
- Born: October 2, 1985 (age 40)
- Bats: Right Throws: Right

NPB debut
- 2011, for the Hanshin Tigers

NPB statistics (through 2016)
- Win–loss record: 3–2
- ERA: 3.69
- Strikeouts: 42
- Stats at Baseball Reference

Teams
- Hanshin Tigers (2008–2014); Orix Buffaloes (2015–2016)

Hirokazu Shiranita (白仁田 寛和, born October 2, 1985) is a Japanese professional baseball pitcher for the Orix Buffaloes in Japan's Nippon Professional Baseball. He was drafted in the first round of the 2007 University/Adult Draft by the Hanshin Tigers after graduating from Fukuoka University. Shiranita made 4 appearances in 7 years for Hanshin, recording 1 win and a 3.00 ERA. At the end of the 2014 season he was traded to the Orix Buffaloes for Kentaro Kuwahara.
