= Anthony Claggett =

American baseball player (born 1984)

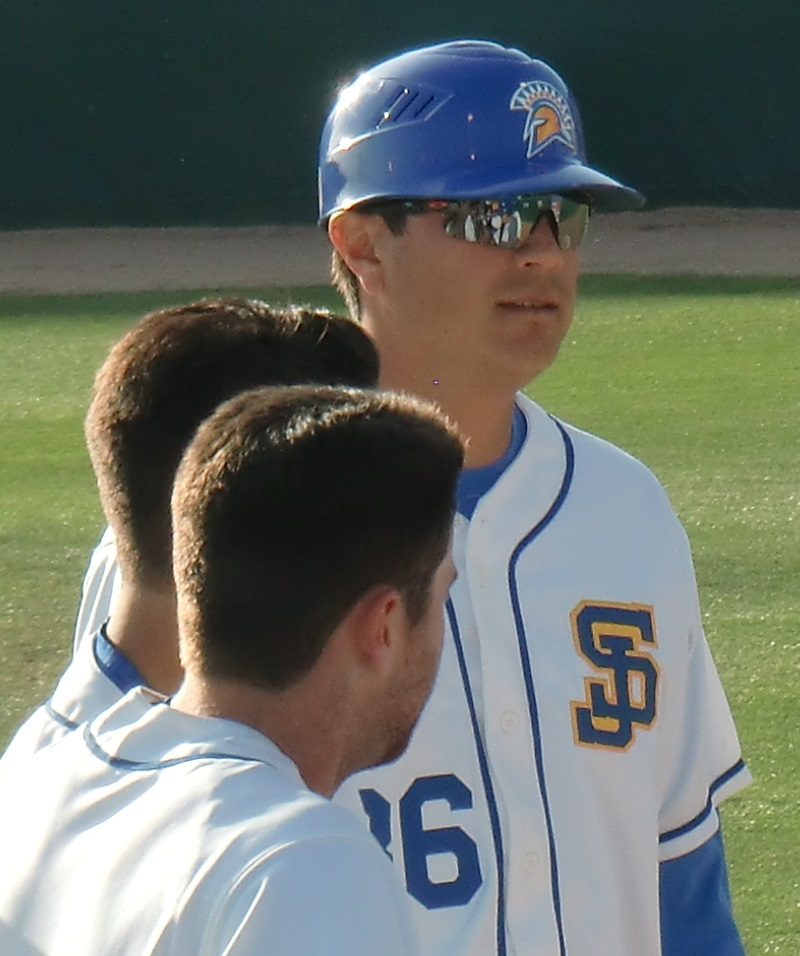
- Claggett in 2017 as San Jose State volunteer assistant coach

Wichita State Shockers
- Pitcher
- Born: July 15, 1984 (age 42); Hemet, California, U.S.
- Batted: Switch Threw: Right

MLB debut
- April 18, 2009, for the New York Yankees

Last MLB appearance
- October 3, 2009, for the Pittsburgh Pirates

MLB statistics
- Win–loss record: 0–0
- Earned run average: 27.00
- Strikeouts: 3
- Stats at Baseball Reference

Teams
- New York Yankees (2009); Pittsburgh Pirates (2009)

Anthony Paul Claggett (born July 15, 1984) is an American college baseball coach and former Major League Baseball pitcher. He is the pitching coach at Wichita State University. He played college baseball at University of California, Riverside. He played for the New York Yankees and Pittsburgh Pirates in 2009. Since 2014, Claggett has been a coach at both the collegiate and professional levels.

== Amateur career ==
Claggett attended Palm Springs High School, where he was primarily a shortstop in baseball and a forward in basketball. He was inducted into the Palm Springs High School Hall of Fame in 2019.

He earned a scholarship to the University of California, Riverside as a middle infielder. It wasn't until his sophomore year that the Highlanders tried him as a pitcher. He attended UC Riverside from 2003 to 2005.

== Professional career ==
=== Detroit Tigers ===
Claggett was originally selected by the Detroit Tigers in the 11th round of the 2005 Major League Baseball draft. That year, he pitched to a 4.03 ERA with 25 strikeouts and seven saves in 22.1 innings for the Oneonta Tigers in the Short Season Single-A New York-Penn League.

Claggett started the 2006 season with the West Michigan Whitecaps in the Midwest League, maintaining a 0.91 ERA with 58 strikeouts and 14 saves in 59.1 innings. For his performance that year, MiLB.com named him the Class-A Relief Pitcher of the Year.

=== New York Yankees ===
The New York Yankees acquired him from Detroit, along with right-handed pitchers Humberto Sánchez and Kevin Whelan, in exchange for outfielder Gary Sheffield on November 10, 2006. In 2007, the Yankees tried Claggett out as a starter. He was 9–8 with a 3.69 ERA in 112.1 innings, including 16 starts, for the Tampa Yankees in High-A. After the season, he played for the Honolulu Sharks in the Hawaii Winter Baseball league.

He began the 2008 season on the disabled list with a left hamstring strain, then made one appearance with Tampa before being promoted to Double-A Trenton. He spent the rest of the year with the Trenton Thunder, going 4–2 with nine saves and a 2.15 ERA in 29 relief appearances. Claggett was added to the Yankees' 40-man roster following after the season to protect him from the Rule 5 draft.

Before the 2009 season, Baseball America named Claggett to have the best slider in the Yankees organization. He began the year with the Scranton/Wilkes-Barre Yankees in Triple-A, pitching to a 3.07 ERA in 82 innings for the season. On April 18, he was called up to the majors. Claggett made his major league debut that day, allowing eight runs on nine hits in 1 2/3 innings to the Cleveland Indians. Between him and starter Chien-Ming Wang, Yankees pitchers allowed 14 runs in the second inning alone. Claggett finished the game with a 43.20 ERA. He was sent back to Scranton/Wilkes-Barre the next day. Claggett was called up again on August 5 and allowed two runs on two hits and two walks in an inning of work against the Boston Red Sox the following day. He was optioned back to Triple-A on August 7 to make room for infielder Ramiro Peña. On September 14, he was designated for assignment to make room for Freddy Guzman.

=== Pittsburgh Pirates ===
On September 24, 2009, Claggett was claimed by the Pittsburgh Pirates. On October 3, he pitched in his one game for Pittsburgh, allowing a home run to Joey Votto in the 8th inning. He was designated for assigned on January 21, 2010, to make room on the roster for Octavio Dotel. Claggett was subsequently outrighted to Triple-A after clearing waivers. He remained in the Pirates organization for the 2010 and 2011 season, struggling to such a degree that he was demoted to Double-A Altoona. After the 2011 season Claggett was granted free agency.

=== Somerset Patriots ===
Claggett signed with the Somerset Patriots of the Atlantic League on March 28, 2012. He allowed 21 runs on 27 hits across 10 appearances for the Patriots before getting released on June 5.

=== St. Paul Saints ===
He signed with the St. Paul Saints of the American Association of Professional Baseball in June 2012. Claggett pitched to a 5.05 ERA with a 1.513 WHIP in 76.2 innings between the bullpen and rotation. He returned for the 2013 season, leading the Saints rotation with a 3.11 ERA in 142 innings as a starting pitcher. Following the season, the Saints loaned Claggett to the York Revolution of the Atlantic League. He started two games for the Revs, pitching to a 1.59 ERAS in 17 innings. Claggett once again signed with the Saints for the 2014 season, once again leading the rotation with a 3.55 ERA in 126.2 innings across 19 starts.

=== Perth Heat ===
Claggett also played for the Perth Heat of the Australian Baseball League for the 2012-2013 and 2013-2014 seasons, leading the team to a championship in his second season with a 2.96 ERA in 12 starts.

=== New Jersey Jackals ===
He joined the New Jersey Jackals of the Can-Am League for the 2015 season, pitching to a 4.10 ERA in 68 innings over 11 starts.

== Coaching career ==
While still playing minor league baseball, Claggett worked in his first coaching position in 2014 as pitching coach and recruiting coordinator at the College of the Desert, a junior college in Palm Desert, California. In 2015, Claggett became pitching coach for the New Jersey Jackals of the Can-Am League. Returning to the collegiate level, Claggett was pitching coach and recruiting coordinator at Riverside City College in 2016.

Claggett moved up to the NCAA Division I level in 2017 as volunteer assistant coach at San Jose State under manager Jason Hawkins. In 2018 and 2019, Claggett served as pitching coach at New Mexico State under Brian Green. Claggett followed Green to Washington State University in the summer of 2019 to serve as pitching coach. They stayed with the Cougars for four years before joining Wichita State University in 2023, where he will serve as pitching coach and recruiting assistant.
