= John Murray Field =

Baseball stadium in Sheldon, Queensland

- Interactive map of John Murray Field
- Location: Duncan Road, Sheldon, Queensland, Australia
- Coordinates: 27°34′1″S 153°13′12″E
- Owner: Queensland Government
- Surface: Grass
- Field size: Left Field – 330 feet (101 m); Center Field – 395 feet (120 m); Right Field – 330 feet (101 m)

Construction
- Opened: 1995
- Renovated: 2000

Tenants
- Redlands Baseball Club; Claxton Shield

John Murray Field is home to Redlands Baseball Club in Sheldon, about 30 kilometres (19 mi) southeast of Brisbane, Queensland, Australia. It is a fully fenced and regulation size field with field level fenced dugouts, 2 bullpens, 2 indoor battery cages with an automated pitching machine, an air-conditioned scorers box. Floodlighting is of AAA standard and has hosted trial games for various countries including the Netherlands, Italy and United States. Opposite to John Murray Field is the Tony Street Field which serves as a playing field for juniors and minor league senior teams as well as a warm up and training field.

Redlands has hosted the Claxton Shield 2008 for the Queensland Rams and will host three Claxton Shield 2009 games.
