= Hirotaka Koishi =

Japanese baseball player

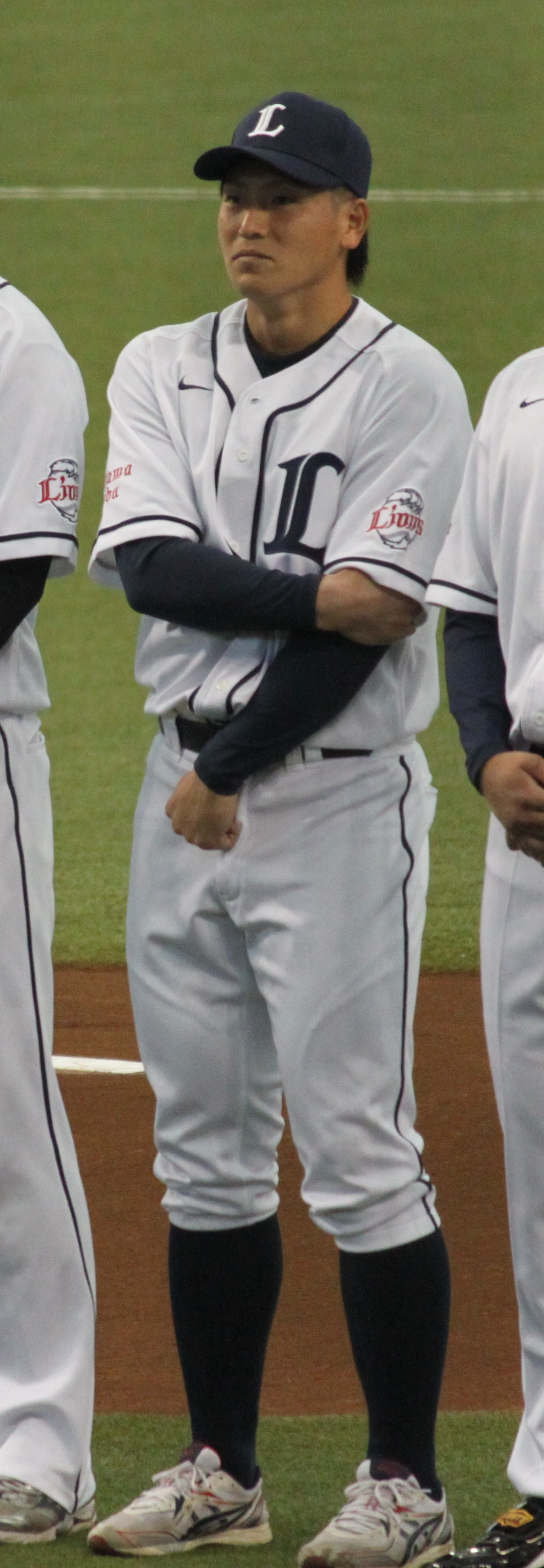
- Pitcher
- Born: April 13, 1987 (age 38); Hayami District, Ōita, Japan
- Bats: Left Throws: Left

debut
- April 26, 2012, for the Saitama Seibu Lions

NPB statistics (through 2016 season)
- Win–loss record: 1–5
- Saves: 1
- ERA: 4.61
- Strikeouts: 87
- Stats at Baseball Reference

Teams
- Saitama Seibu Lions (2012–2019)

Hirotaka Koishi (小石 博孝, Koishi Hirotaka; born April 13, 1993) is a professional Japanese baseball player. He plays pitcher for the Saitama Seibu Lions.
