= Shōta Nakata =

Japanese baseball player (born 1990)

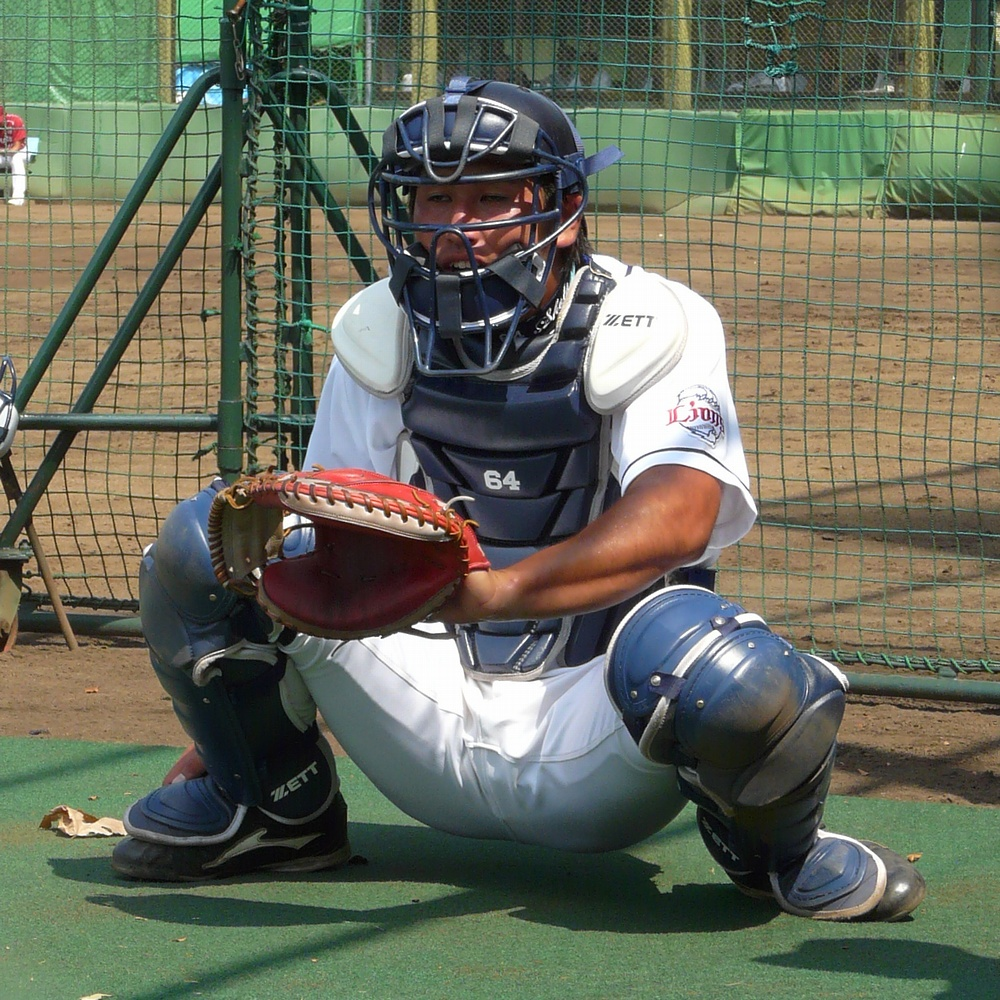

Saitama Seibu Lions – No. 96
- Catcher / Coach
- Born: February 22, 1990 (age 36); Nishinomiya, Hyōgo, Japan
- Batted: Right Threw: Right

NPB debut
- October 6, 2012, for the Saitama Seibu Lions

Last appearance
- August 8, 2019, for the Saitama Seibu Lions

NPB statistics
- Batting average: .050
- Hits: 1
- Home runs: 0
- Runs batted in: 0
- Stolen base: 0
- Stats at Baseball Reference

Teams
- As player: Saitama Seibu Lions (2008–2019); As coach: Saitama Seibu Lions (2022–present)

Shōta Nakata (中田 祥多, Nakata Shōta; born February 22, 1990 in Nishinomiya, Hyōgo) is a retired Japanese professional catcher.
