= Masanori Fujihara =

Japanese baseball player

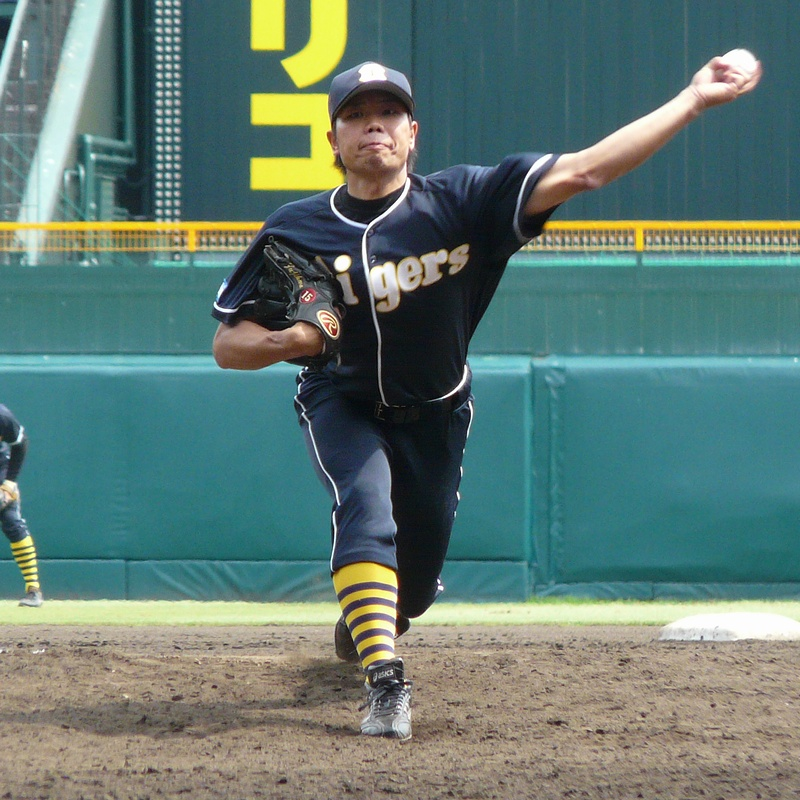
- Fujihara with the Hanshin Tigers
- Pitcher
- Born: January 14, 1988 (age 38); Ibigawa, Gifu, Japan
- Bats: Right Throws: Right

NPB debut
- 2010, for the Hanshin Tigers

NPB statistics (through 2013)
- Win–loss record: 2–0
- ERA: 2.59
- Strikeouts: 50
- Stats at Baseball Reference

Teams
- Hanshin Tigers (2010–2013)

Masanori Fujihara (藤原 正典, Fujihara Masanori; born January 14, 1988 in Ibigawa, Gifu) is a Japanese former professional baseball pitcher. He played for the Hanshin Tigers in Japan's Nippon Professional Baseball from 2010 to 2013.
