= Narrabundah Ballpark =

Baseball stadium near Canberra, Australia

- The Fort
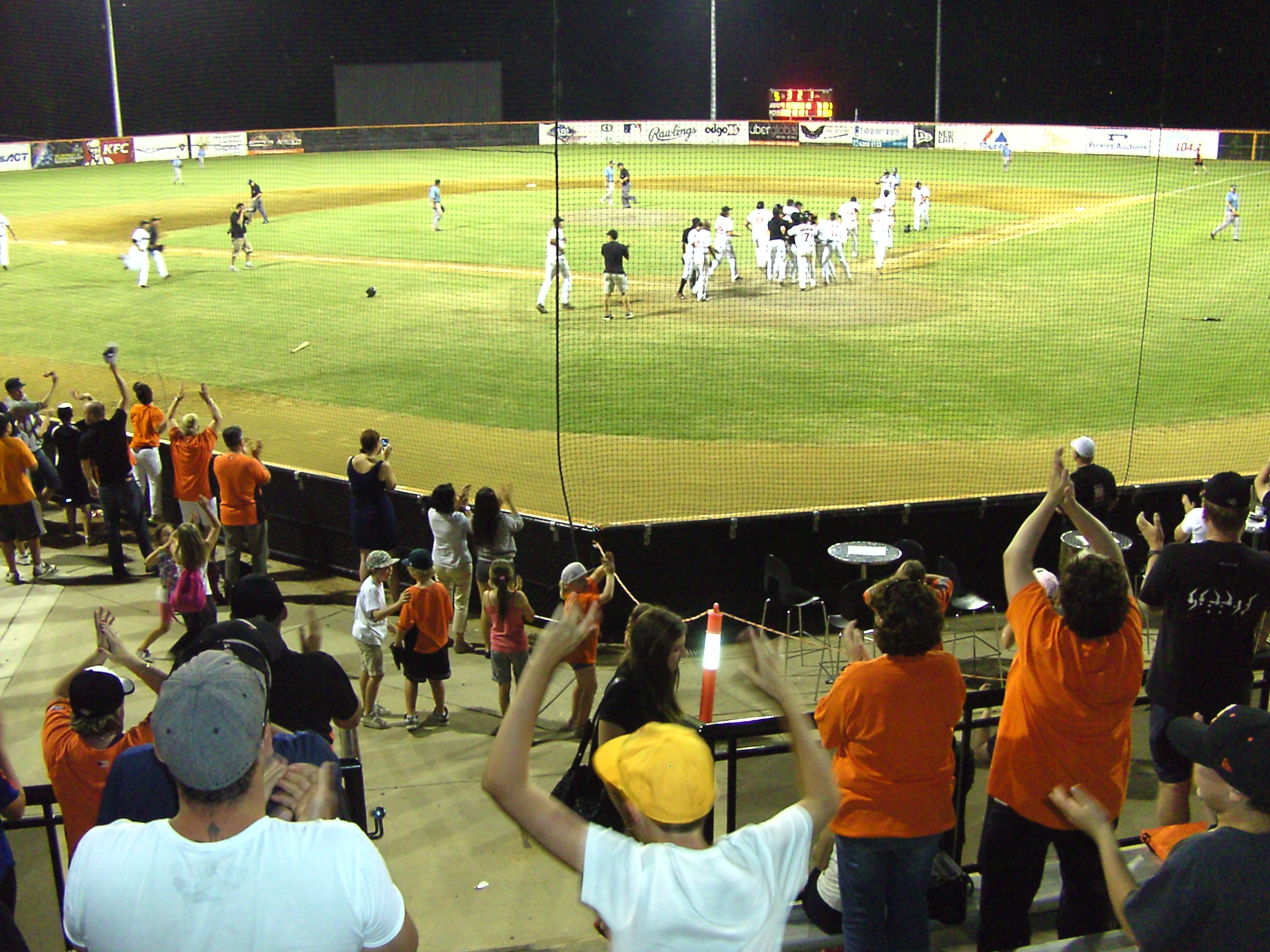
- Interactive map of Narrabundah Ballpark
- Location: Narrabundah, Australian Capital Territory
- Coordinates: 35°20′21″S 149°9′17″E
- Owner: ACT Government
- Capacity: 2,250
- Surface: Grass
- Scoreboard: Yes
- Record attendance: 2,275
- Field size: Left Field - 330 feet (101 m); Center Field - 393 feet (120 m); Right Field - 330 feet (101 m)

Construction
- Renovated: 2010 (August - October)
- Cost: $1.4m

Tenant
- Canberra Cavalry (2010-present)

Narrabundah Ballpark (also known as The Fort) is a 2,250 capacity baseball complex in the south-central Canberra suburb of Narrabundah, ACT, Australia. It was redeveloped in 2010 for use by the Canberra Cavalry of the Australian Baseball League (ABL). The Australian Capital Territory Government funded the $1,400,000 upgrade.

== Stadium Facilities ==
In 2010, The ACT Government invested $1.4 million into the complex to bring it up to ABL standards in order for the Canberra Cavalry to be established and compete in the league. Guideline ACT was appointed the construction company that oversaw the redevelopment, the company won an award for their work on the ballpark in 2011.

Narrabundah Ballpark complex consists of three fields. The primary field at The Fort is used by the Canberra Cavalry in the ABL and its dimensions are L:101m x C:120m x R:101m. The field has full-size dugouts, broadcast standard lighting, a roofed grandstand with additional bleacher seating, drought-tolerant turf, state of the art irrigation system, electronic scoreboard and player safety padding. Field two has a full diamond and field lighting sufficient for domestic use. Field three also has a full diamond but does not have lights.

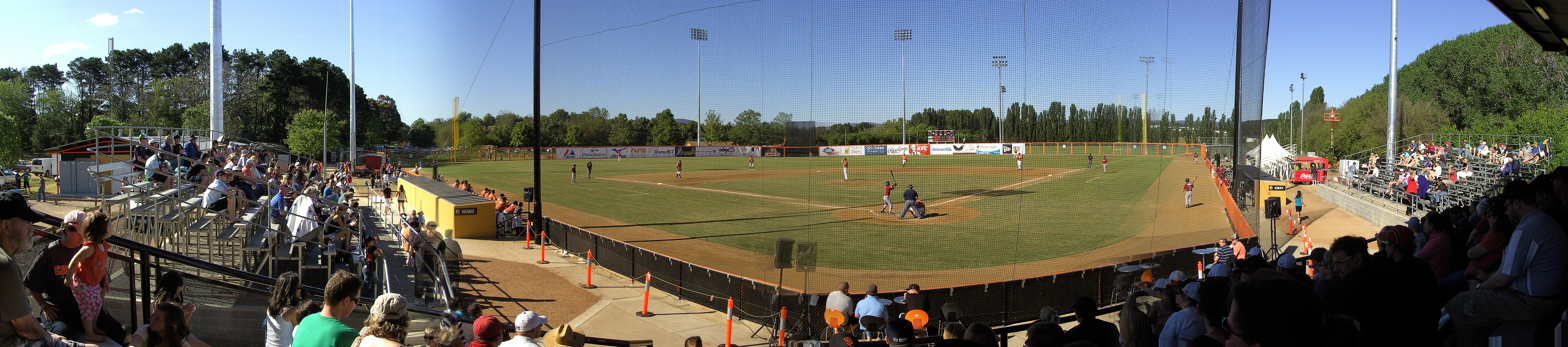
Saturday 20 November 2010: Canberra Cavalry (home team) batting against Melbourne Aces

In 2012, ACT Labor made an election promise to spend an additional $5 million on further upgrades to the ballpark if re-elected. Under the proposal the money would be spent over three years between 2014 and 2017. The upgrade would include a new grandstand, improved player and public amenities, improved concession and retail outlet, realignment of the field along the first and third base lines and improvements to public access and car parking.

ACT Labor MLA Andrew Barr travelled to Dell Diamond baseball stadium in Austin, Texas on a fact finding mission in his role as Sports Minister as the ACT Government sought to build knowledge and understanding on building and running a world-class baseball venue while the government considered options for further redevelopment of The Fort.

28 May 2016, funding for stage two of the redevelopment of Narrabundah Ballpark was announced by ACT Labor. $4.5 million would be spent from the 2016-17 budget on the upgrade. Upgrades will include improvements to amenities such as change rooms, toilets and food outlets, extension to the grand stand that will replace the bleacher seating, additional seating at the front of the grandstand at below ground level to provide a unique viewing experience, similar to some MLB venues in the US and enhancements to address parking and traffic at the facility.

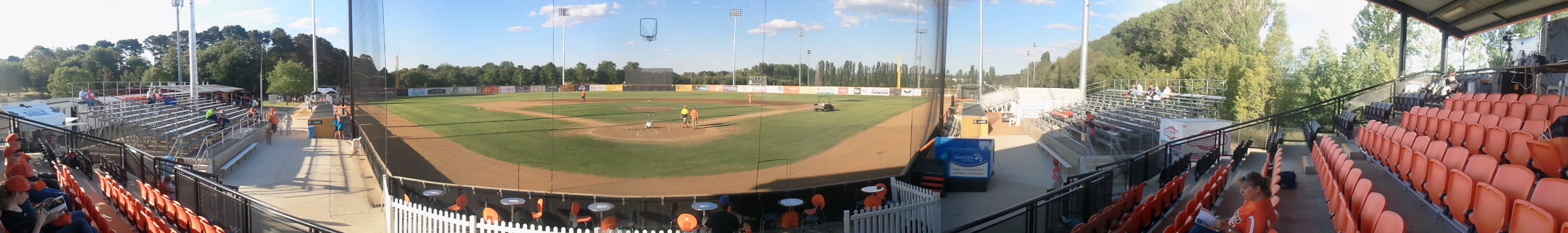
Narrabundah Ballpark, 28 November 2014, game-ready field

== Primary Use ==
Narrabundah Ballpark is primarily used as the home venue for the Canberra Cavalry in the Australian Baseball League as well as Baseball ACT for junior and senior competitions. All of Canberra Baseball's under 8s, 10s and social league matches are played around the complex, while A-Grade utilise the field two on weeknights.

== Events history ==
=== 2012-13 ABL Championship Series ===
The Fort hosted the best of three game championship series in the ABL in 2012–13. Canberra Cavalry played Perth Heat for the right to be crowned ABL Champions. The series and thus the Fort was broadcast live on Fox Sports in Australia and live to over 40 countries worldwide with a potential reach of 40 million homes.

8 February 2013, a crowd of 2,013 turned out for game one and witnessed a close intense match which resulted in the Canberra Cavalry claiming a 6–4 victory to take a 1–0 series lead.

9 February 2013, Canberra won the 2012–13 series by defeating Perth 7–6 in game two of the series at Narrabundah. A then venue record crowd of 2,043 turned out for the match as the Cavs won their first ever Championship in the franchise's history. The series victory also meant the ACT held the Claxton Shield for the first time in its 78-year history.

== Records ==
Record attendance: 2,275 (Canberra Cavalry vs Brisbane Bandits, 9 February 2018, ABL Championship Series: Game 1)

== Gallery ==
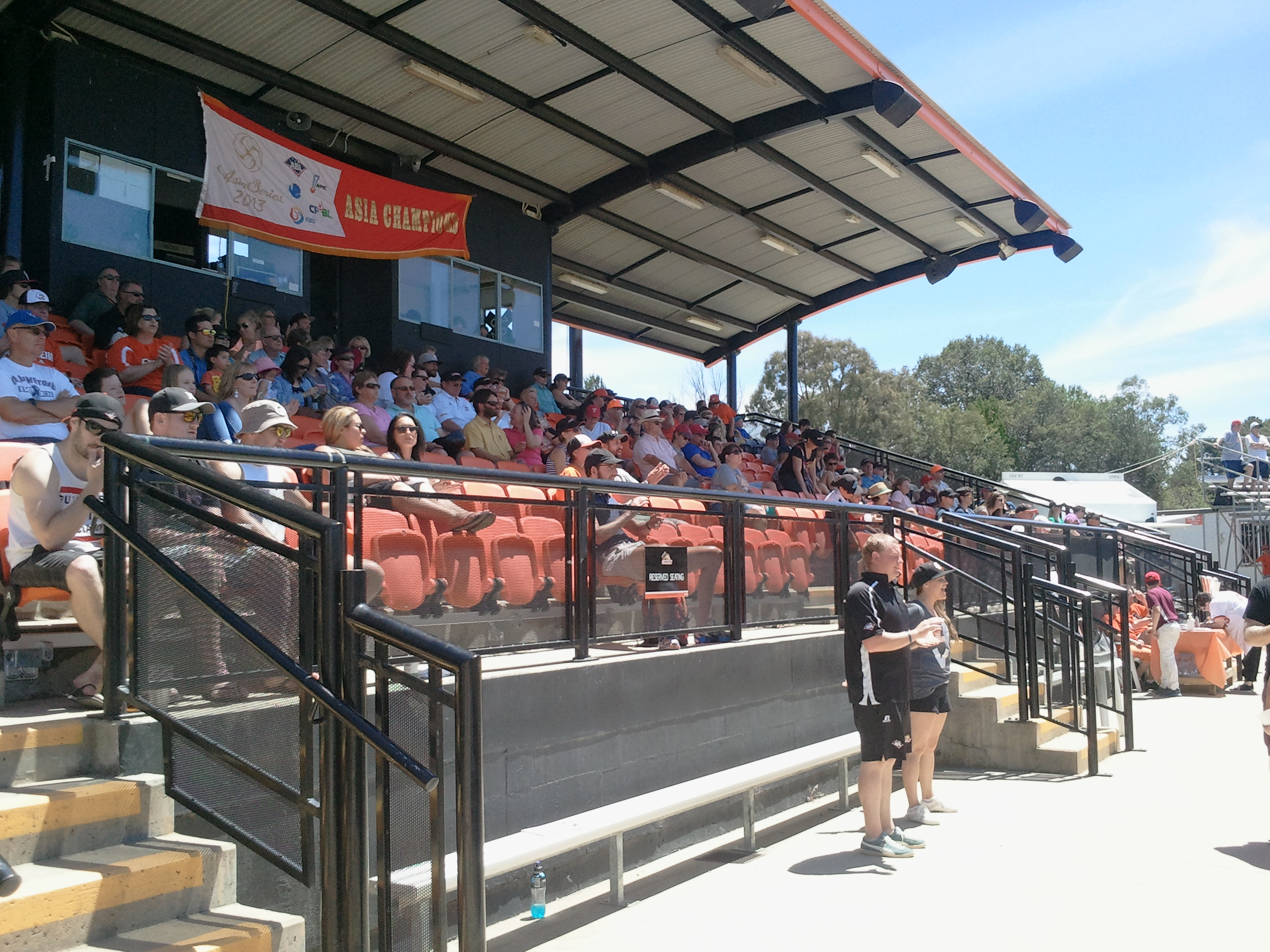
Main Stand at Narrabundah Ballpark

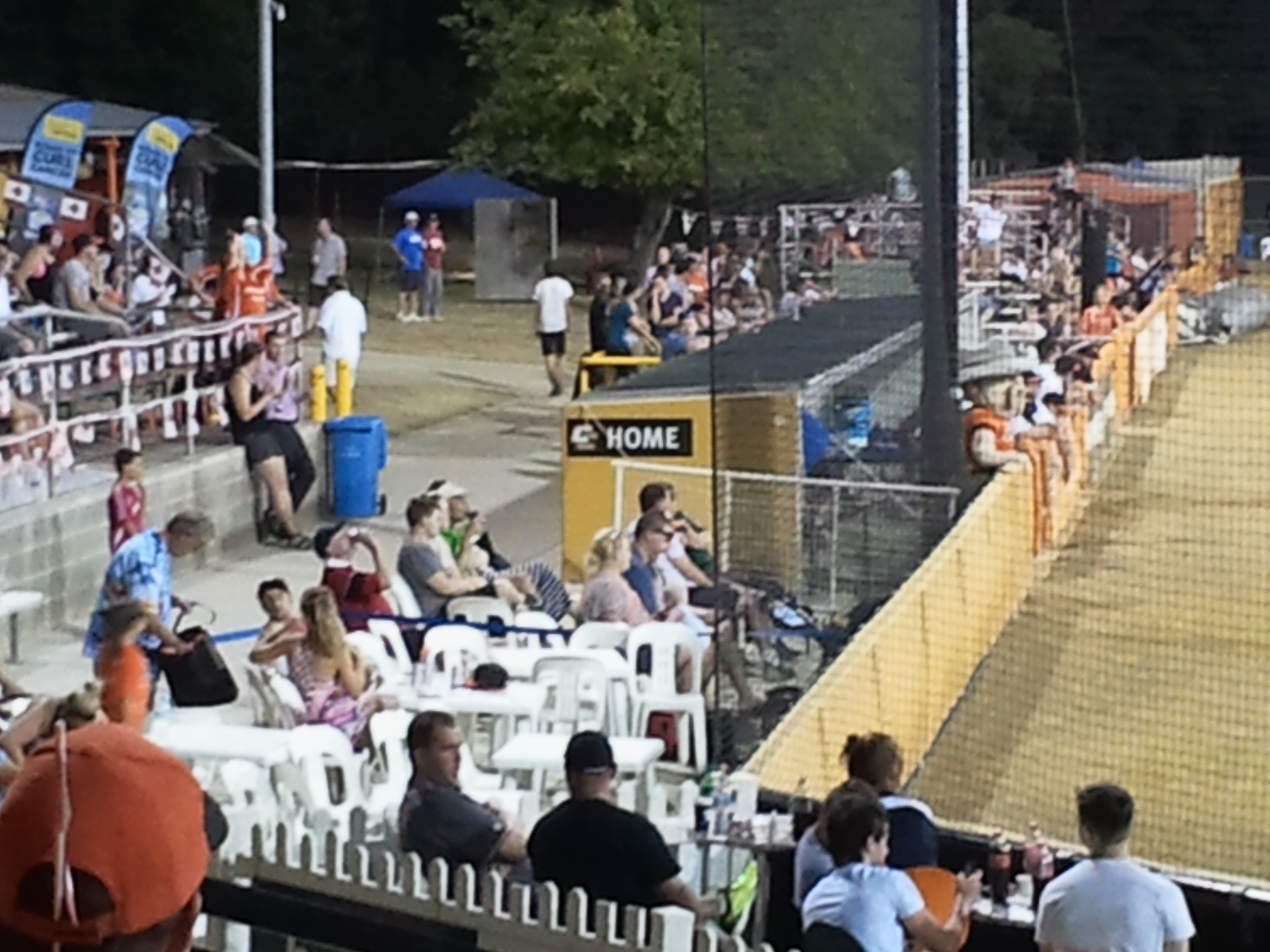
Dugout at Narrabundah Ballpark

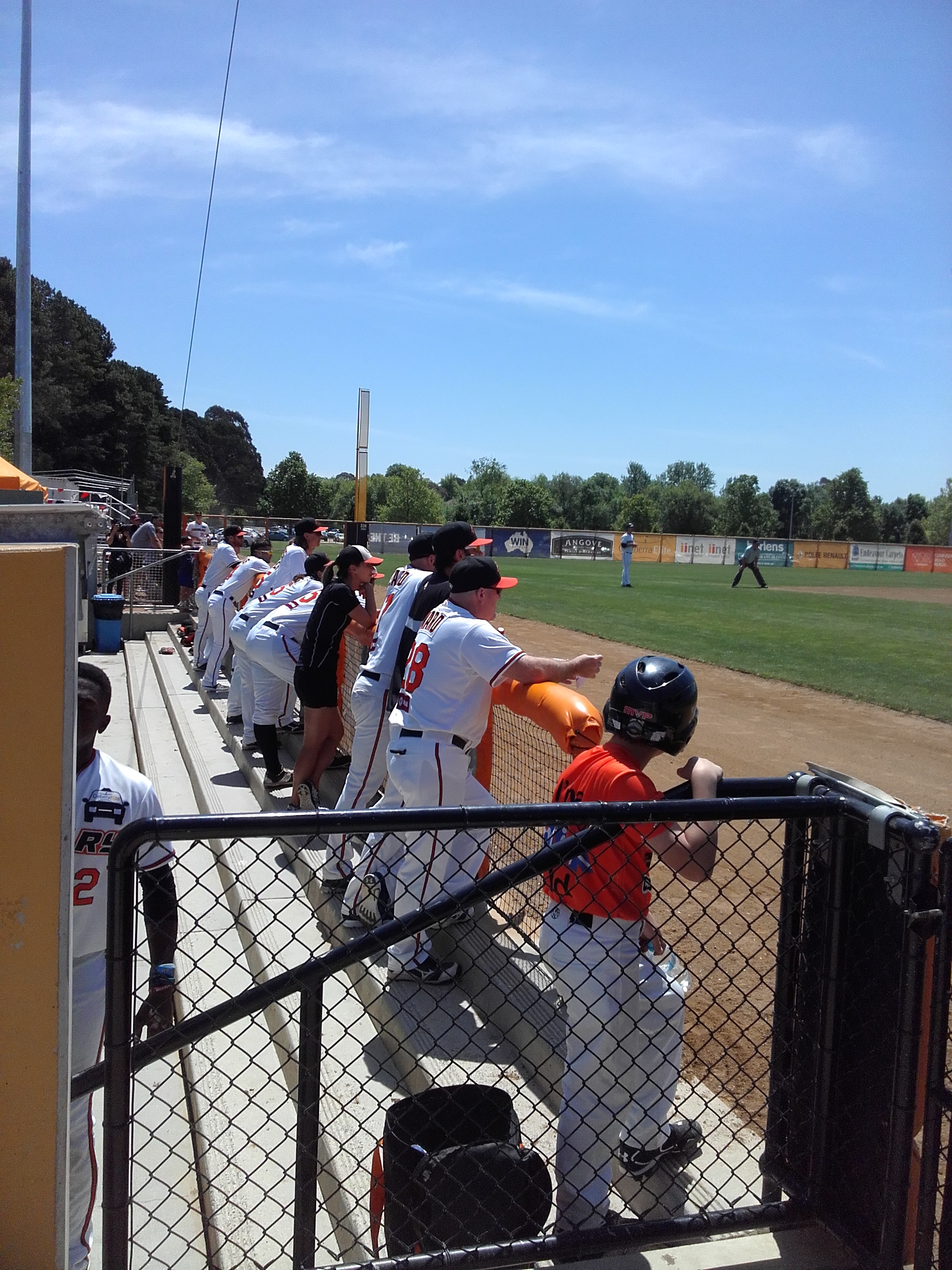
Bullpen at Narrabundah Ballpark
