= 2022 American Association season =

17th annual season of American Association Baseball

- League: American Association of Professional Baseball
- Sport: Baseball
- Duration: May 13 – September 5
- Games: 100
- Teams: 12

East Division
- League champions: Chicago Dogs

West Division
- League champions: Kansas City Monarchs

American Association Championship
- Champions: Fargo-Moorhead RedHawks
- Runners-up: Milwaukee Milkmen

Seasons
- ← 2021 2023 →

The 2022 American Association season is the 17th season of professional baseball in the American Association of Professional Baseball (AA) since its creation in October 2005. There are 12 AA teams, split evenly between the East Division and the West Division.

== Season schedule ==
During the Off-Season the league added Lake Country DockHounds to replace the temporary traveling team Houston Apollos. The league was split up into two divisions, the East and West Division. The season will be played with a 100-game schedule, with two home series and two road series inside a teams’ division, and one home series and one road series against the clubs outside its division. The top four teams in each division will qualify for the 2022 playoffs.

== Regular season standings ==
as of September 5, 2022

East Division Regular Season Standings
Pos	Team	G	W	L	Pct.	GB
1	y – Chicago Dogs	100	54	46	.540	--
2	x – Kane County Cougars	100	54	46	.540	--
3	x – Milwaukee Milkmen	100	53	47	.530	1.0
4	x – Cleburne Railroaders	100	50	50	.500	4.0
5	e – Gary SouthShore RailCats	100	42	58	.420	12.0
6	e – Lake Country DockHounds	100	34	66	.340	20.0

West Division Regular Season Standings
Pos	Team	G	W	L	Pct.	GB
1	y – Kansas City Monarchs	100	65	35	.650	--
2	x – Fargo-Moorhead RedHawks	100	64	36	.640	1.0
3	x – Winnipeg Goldeyes	100	53	47	.530	12.0
4	x – Lincoln Saltdogs	100	49	51	.490	16.0
5	e – Sioux City Explorers	100	49	51	.490	16.0
6	e – Sioux Falls Canaries	100	33	67	.330	32.0

- y – Clinched division
- x – Clinched playoff spot
- e – Eliminated from playoff contention

== Statistical leaders ==
as of September 5, 2022

=== Hitting ===
Stat	Player	Team	Total
HR	Max Murphy	Winnipeg Goldeyes	31
AVG	Bryan Torres	Milwaukee Milkmen	.374
H	Bryan Torres	Milwaukee Milkmen	139
RBIs	Max Murphy	Winnipeg Goldeyes	96
SB	Danny Amaral	Sioux City Explorers	48

=== Pitching ===
Stat	Player	Team	Total
W	Jack Fox	Kane County Cougars	11
ERA	Matt Hall	Kansas City Monarchs	1.10
SO	Kevin Mcgovern	Fargo-Moorhead RedHawks	141
SV	Alex DuBord	Fargo-Moorhead RedHawks	23

== Awards ==
=== All-star selections ===
==== East Division ====
Elected starters
Position	Player	Team
C	Dylan Kelly	Milkmen
1B	Gio Brusa	DockHounds
2B	Bryan Torres	Milkmen
3B	Dylan Busby	Cougars
SS	Mason Davis	Milkmen
OF	Jimmy Kerrigan	Cougars
OF	Zach Nehrir	Railroaders
OF	Chad Sedio	Milkmen
DH	Keon Barnum	Milkmen

Reserves
Position	Player	Team
C	Ryan Lidge	Dogs
INF	K.C. Hobson	Dogs
INF	Grant Kay	Dogs
INF	Daniel Lingua	RailCats
OF	Danny Mars	Dogs

Pitchers
Player	Team
Hunter Cervenka	Railroaders
Ryan Clark	Dogs
Jack Eisenbarger	RailCats
Harrison Francis	RailCats
Nick Garcia	RailCats
Jordan Kipper	Dogs
Alex McRae	DockHounds
Logan Nissen	Cougars
James Reeves	Dogs
Myles Smith	Milkmen
Ryan Tapani	Cougars

==== West Division ====
Elected starters
Position	Player	Team
C	Deon Stafford Jr.	Goldeyes
1B	Manny Boscan	RedHawks
2B	Darnell Sweeney	Monarchs
3B	David Thompson	Monarchs
SS	Ozzie Martínez	Canaries
INF	Josh Altmann	Saltdogs
OF	Jan Hernandez	Monarchs
OF	John Silviano	RedHawks
DH	Drew Ward	RedHawks

Reserves
Position	Player	Team
C	Alexis Olmeda	Monarchs
INF	Leobaldo Piña	RedHawks
OF	Gabriel Guerrero	Monarchs
OF	Jabari Henry	Canaries
OF	Wyatt Ulrich	Canaries

Pitchers
Player	Team
Alex DuBord	RedHawks
Tyler Grauer	RedHawks
Matt Hartman	Monarchs
Sebastian Kessay	RedHawks
Patrick Ledet	Explorers
Jordan Martinson	Monarchs
Kevin McGovern	RedHawks
Jameson McGrane	Monarchs
Thomas McIlaith	Explorers
Greg Minier	Saltdogs
Tasker Strobel	Goldeyes

All-star game MVP — Jabari Henry

=== Home run derby ===
Quarterfinals		Semifinals		Final
Grant Kay	11 — 5
Jabari Henry	14	David Thompson	16 — 4
Jimmy Kerrigan	10	Jabari Henry	20
John Silviano	9			Jabari Henry	22
K.C. Hobson	10			David Thompson	23
Josh Altman	12	Josh Altman	16 — 3
Keon Barnum	11 — 4	Grant Kay	15
David Thompson	19

=== End of year awards ===
- TBD

== Playoffs ==
=== Format ===
In 2022, the top four teams in each division will advance to the playoffs. In a nod to innovation, and to reward the clubs with the best regular seasons, the club that wins the division in the regular season will pick their first-round opponent of the qualifiers within the division, in the best-of-three Division Playoff Series.

In the second round, the Division Championship Series will also be a best-of-three series. The Miles Wolff Cup Finals will culminate in the crowning of a league champion, with a best-of-five series to determine the league champion.

=== Playoff bracket ===
Division Playoff Series (best-of-three)
1	Chicago Dogs	1
3	Milwaukee Milkmen	2
East
2	Kane County Cougars	1
4	Cleburne Railroaders	2
1	Kansas City Monarchs	2
4	Lincoln Saltdogs	0
West
2	Fargo-Moorhead RedHawks	2
3	Winnipeg Goldeyes	1

Division Championship Series (best-of-three)
Milwaukee Milkmen	2
Cleburne Railroaders	0
Kansas City Monarchs	1
Fargo-Moorhead RedHawks	2

American Association Championship Series (best-of-five)
Milwaukee Milkmen	2
Fargo-Moorhead RedHawks	3

== Notable players ==
Former Major League Baseball players who played in the American Association in 2022

- Matt Adams (Kansas City)
- Buddy Baumann (Lincoln)
- Akeem Bostick (Kansas City)
- Bryce Brentz (Kane County)
- Hunter Cervenka (Cleburne)
- Brandon Cunniff (Lincoln)
- Dean Deetz (Sioux Falls)
- Jose Espada (Milwaukee)
- Nick Franklin (Kane County/Sioux City)
- Nick Gardewine (Cleburne)
- Miguel Gómez (Milwaukee)
- Gabby Guerrero (Kansas City)
- Matt Hall (Kansas City)
- Blaine Hardy (Sioux City)
- Cam Hill (Kansas City)
- Mickey Jannis (Chicago)
- Sherman Johnson (Kane County)
- Pete Kozma (Kansas City)
- Jacob Lindgren (Kansas City)
- Rymer Liriano (Fargo-Moorhead)
- Steve Lombardozzi Jr. (Kane County)
- Josh Lucas (Cleburne/Winnipeg)
- Ozzie Martínez (Sioux Falls)
- Wyatt Mathisen (Cleburne)
- Kevin McCarthy (Cleburne)
- Alex McRae (Lake Country)
- Ryan Miller (Sioux Falls)
- Mike Morin (Kane County)
- Zac Reininger (Cleburne)
- Jacob Robson (Kansas City)
- Nivaldo Rodriguez (Sioux City)
- Jason Rogers (Lincoln)
- Héctor Sánchez (Cleburne/Milwaukee)
- Brian Schlitter (Chicago)
- AJ Schugel (Milwaukee)
- Mallex Smith (Kansas City)
- Darnell Sweeney (Kansas City)
- Lewis Thorpe (Kansas City)
- Charlie Tilson (Chicago)
- David Washington (Winnipeg)
- Stevie Wilkerson (Chicago)
- Vance Worley (Kane County)

== See also ==
- 2022 in baseball
- 2022 Major League Baseball season
