= 2021 American Association season =

15th annual season of American Association Baseball

- League: American Association of Professional Baseball
- Sport: Baseball
- Duration: May 18 – September 6 (Playoffs: September 8 – September 22)
- Games: 100
- Teams: 12

North Division
- League champions: Chicago Dogs

South Division
- League champions: Kansas City Monarchs

American Association Championship
- Champions: Kansas City Monarchs
- Runners-up: Fargo-Moorhead RedHawks
- Finals MVP: Gabby Guerrero

Seasons
- ← 2020 2022 →

The 2021 American Association season is the 16th season of professional baseball in the American Association of Professional Baseball (AA) since its creation in October 2005. There are 12 AA teams, split evenly between the North Division and the South Division.

== Season schedule ==
After the folding of the Texas AirHogs and the loss of the St. Paul Saints to the Minnesota Twins organization, the league added the Kane County Cougars as the 11th member of the AA with the Houston Apollos serving as the 12th team, operating as a road travel team for the season. Additionally, the Kansas City T-Bones rebranded to the Kansas City Monarchs to honor the original negro league team. The league was split up into two divisions, the North and South Division. The season will be played with a 100-game schedule, with two home series and two road series inside a teams’ division, and one home series and one road series against the clubs outside its division. The top three teams in each division will qualify for the 2021 playoffs.

== Regular season standings ==
Current through September 6, 2021.

North Division Regular Season Standings
Pos	Team	G	W	L	Pct.	GB
1	y – Chicago Dogs	100	63	37	.630	--
2	x – Fargo-Moorhead RedHawks	99	61	38	.616	1.5
3	x – Milwaukee Milkmen	100	59	41	.590	4.0
4	e – Winnipeg Goldeyes	99	50	49	.505	12.5
5	e – Kane County Cougars	99	44	55	.444	18.5
6	e – Gary SouthShore RailCats	100	39	61	.390	24.0

South Division Regular Season Standings
Pos	Team	G	W	L	Pct.	GB
1	y – Kansas City Monarchs	100	69	31	.690	--
2	x – Cleburne Railroaders	100	54	46	.540	15.0
3	x –Sioux City Explorers	99	53	46	.535	15.5
4	e –Lincoln Saltdogs	100	53	47	.530	16.0
5	e – Sioux Falls Canaries	100	36	64	.360	33.0
6	e – Houston Apollos	100	17	83	.170	52.0

- y – Clinched division
- x – Clinched playoff spot
- e – Eliminated from playoff contention

== Statistical leaders ==
as of September 6, 2021

=== Hitting ===
Stat	Player	Team	Total
HR	Adam Brett Walker II	Milwaukee Milkmen	33
AVG	Manuel Boscan	Fargo-Moorhead RedHawks	0.344
H	Alay Lago	Cleburne Railroaders	141
RBIs	Kyle Martin	Winnipeg Goldeyes	106
SB	Logan Trowbridge	Milwaukee Milkmen	40

=== Pitching ===
Stat	Player	Team	Total
W	Myles Smith	Milwaukee Milkmen	13
ERA	Kyle Kinman	Lincoln Saltdogs	2.90
SO	Myles Smith	Milwaukee Milkmen	134
SV	James Pugliese	Lincoln Saltdogs	25

== Playoff bracket ==
Wildcard Game
North Division
2	Fargo-Moorhead RedHawks	5
3	Milwaukee Milkmen	0
South Division
2	Cleburne Railroaders	0
3	Sioux City Explorers	4

Division Championship Series best of 5
1	Chicago Dogs	2
Fargo-Moorhead RedHawks	3
1	Kansas City Monarchs	3
Sioux City Explorers	0

League Championship Series best of 5
Fargo-Moorhead RedHawks	0
Kansas City Monarchs	3

== Notable players ==
Former and/or future Major League Baseball players who played in the American Association in 2021

- Johnny Barbato (Lincoln)
- Cam Booser (Chicago)
- Michael Bowden (Chicago)
- Dean Deetz (Kansas City)
- Brian Ellington (Kansas City)
- Tyler Ferguson (Chicago)
- Johnny Field (Kansas City)
- Nick Franklin (Kansas City/Sioux City)
- Caleb Frare (Sioux Falls)
- Christian Friedrich (Chicago)
- Nick Gardewine (Cleburne)
- Gabriel Guerrero (Kansas City)
- Matt Hall (Kansas City)
- Donnie Hart (Winnipeg)
- Kevin Herget (Fargo-Moorhead)
- David Holmberg (Milwaukee)
- Brian Johnson (Milwaukee)
- Jacob Lindgren (Kansas City)
- Michael Mariot (Cleburne)
- Ozzie Martínez (Cleburne)
- Bud Norris (Winnipeg)
- Paulo Orlando (Kansas City)
- Jacob Rhame (Cleburne)
- Keyvius Sampson (Kansas City)
- Justin Shafer (Kansas City)
- Eric Stout (Kansas City)
- Darnell Sweeney (Kansas City)
- Joey Terdoslavich (Chicago)
- Logan Verrett (Cleburne)
- David Washington (Milwaukee)
- Zack Weiss (Kansas City)
- Vance Worley (Kane County)

== See also ==
- 2021 in baseball
- 2021 Major League Baseball season
- Impact of the COVID-19 pandemic on sports
