= Ben Leeper =

American baseball player (born 1997)

Cleburne Railroaders
- Pitcher
- Born: June 15, 1997 (age 29); Bedford, Texas, U.S.
- Bats: Right Throws: Right

Benjamin Kyle Leeper (born June 15, 1997) is an American professional baseball pitcher for the Cleburne Railroaders of the American Association of Professional Baseball.

== Amateur career ==
Leeper attended Carroll Senior High School in Southlake, Texas. In 2014, as a junior, he went 11–1 with a 0.90 ERA and 106 strikeouts. He underwent Tommy John surgery during his senior year. After graduating, he enrolled at Oklahoma State University where he played college baseball.

Leeper made two appearances as a freshman in 2016 before an arm injury that required a second Tommy John surgery, forcing him to miss all of the 2017 season as well. He returned to play in 2018, pitching 27 2/3 innings in which he compiled a 12.69 ERA. In 2019, he moved into the closer role and pitched to a 4–4 record, a 4.31 ERA, and seven saves with 43 strikeouts over 31 1/3 innings. That summer, he played collegiate summer baseball with the Wareham Gatemen of the Cape Cod Baseball League. He made six appearances in 2020 before the season was cancelled due to the COVID-19 pandemic.

== Professional career ==
=== Chicago Cubs ===
Unselected in the 2020 Major League Baseball draft, Leeper signed with the Chicago Cubs as an undrafted free agent on July 21, 2020. Leeper made his professional debut in 2021 with the Tennessee Smokies of the Double-A South and was promoted to the Iowa Cubs of the Triple-A East in early June. He was shut down in mid-August after pitching the most innings he had thrown since his junior year of high school. Over 35 relief innings pitched between the two teams, Leeper went 4–3 with a 1.29 ERA and 53 strikeouts. He was a non-roster invitee to spring training in 2022. He returned to Iowa for the 2022 season. Over 42 relief appearances, he went 3–3 with a 4.50 ERA and 57 strikeouts over 46 innings.

On April 4, 2023, Leeper announced that he had undergone Tommy John surgery for the third time, and would miss the entire 2023 season as a result. He returned action in 2024, making 13 rehab appearances split between the rookie-level Arizona Complex League Cubs, High-A South Bend Cubs, and Double-A Tennessee. Leeper made eight appearances for the Doubpe-A Knoxville Smokies in 2025, recording a 2.16 ERA with 10 strikeouts across 8 1/3 innings pitched. Leeper was released by the Cubs organization on August 8, 2025.

=== Cleburne Railroaders ===
On April 21, 2026, Leeper signed with the Cleburne Railroaders of the American Association of Professional Baseball.
