= 2025 American Association season =

20th annual season of American Association Baseball

- League: American Association of Professional Baseball
- Sport: Baseball
- Duration: May 8 – September 1
- Games: 100
- Teams: 12

East Division
- League champions: Kane County Cougars

West Division
- League champions: Sioux Falls Canaries

Miles Wolff Cup Finals
- Champions: Kane County Cougars (2nd title)
- Runners-up: Sioux Falls Canaries

Seasons
- ← 2024 2026 →

The 2025 American Association season is the 20th season of professional baseball in the American Association of Professional Baseball (AA) since its creation in October 2005. There were 12 teams in the league, split evenly between the East Division and the West Division.

== Regular season standings ==
As of September 2, 2025

East Division Regular Season Standings
Pos	Team	G	W	L	Pct.	GB
1	y – Lake Country DockHounds	100	55	45	.550	--
2	x –Chicago Dogs	99	50	49	.505	4.5
3	x –Kane County Cougars	100	49	51	.490	6.0
4	x –Milwaukee Milkmen	100	45	55	.450	10.0
5	e –Cleburne Railroaders	100	43	57	.430	12.0
6	e – Gary SouthShore RailCats	100	38	62	.380	17.0

West Division Regular Season Standings
Pos	Team	G	W	L	Pct.	GB
1	y – Sioux City Explorers	100	64	36	.640	--
2	x – Kansas City Monarchs	100	59	41	.590	5.0
3	x – Sioux Falls Canaries	100	58	42	.580	6.0
4	x – Fargo-Moorhead RedHawks	100	55	45	.550	9.0
5	e – Lincoln Saltdogs	100	42	58	.420	22.0
6	e – Winnipeg Goldeyes	99	41	58	.414	22.5

- y – Clinched division
- x – Clinched playoff spot
- e – Eliminated from playoff contention

== Statistical leaders ==
=== Hitting ===
Stat	Player	Team	Total
HR	Kyle Martin	Cleburne Railroaders	29
AVG	Calvin Estrada	Sioux Falls Canaries	.352
H	Calvin Estrada	Sioux Falls Canaries	129
RBIs	Kyle Martin	Cleburne Railroaders	90
SB	Austin Davis	Sioux City Explorers	39

=== Pitching ===
Stat	Player	Team	Total
W	Jared Wetherbee Jake Dykhoff	Sioux City Explorers Fargo-Moorhead RedHawks	11
ERA	Jake Dykhoff	Fargo-Moorhead RedHawks	1.63
IP	Mitchell Lambson	Winnipeg Goldeyes	129.2
SO	Julian Garcia	Kansas City Monarchs	163
SV	Felix Cepeda	Sioux City Explorers	24

== Awards ==
=== All-star selections ===
==== East Division ====
Pos.	Player	Team
P	Konnor Ash	Kane County Cougars
P	Denny Bentley	Milwaukee Milkmen
P	Jacob Coats	Gary SouthShore RailCats
P	Derek Craft	Cleburne Railroaders
P	Jacob DeLabio	Chicago Dogs
P	Juan Diaz	Milwaukee Milkmen
P	Jake Gozzo	Kane County Cougars
P	Luke Hansel	Lake Country DockHounds
P	JC Keys	Chicago Dogs
P	Jeff Lindgren (DNP)	Chicago Dogs
P	Kade Mechals (DNP)	Cleburne Railroaders
C	Erik Ostberg	Milwaukee Milkmen
C	Andres Sosa	Cleburne Railroaders
INF	Marcus Chiu	Kane County Cougars
INF	Henry Kusiak	Chicago Dogs
INF	Shed Long Jr.	Cleburne Railroaders
INF	Todd Lott	Kane County Cougars
INF	Kyle Martin	Cleburne Railroaders
INF	Elvis Peralta	Gary SouthShore RailCats
INF	Dustin Peterson	Cleburne Railroaders
INF	Daunte Stuart	Lake Country DockHounds
INF	Jacob Teter	Chicago Dogs
OF	Aaron Altherr	Cleburne Railroaders
OF	Trendon Craig	Kane County Cougars
OF	Brian Rey	Lake Country DockHounds
OF	Jairus Richards	Gary SouthShore RailCats
OF	Steven Rivas	Cleburne Railroaders
OF	Armond Upshaw	Kane County Cougars

==== West Division ====
Pos.	Player	Team
P	Garrett Alexander	Fargo-Moorhead RedHawks
P	Felix Cepeda	Sioux City Explorers
P	Kyle Crigger	Fargo-Moorhead RedHawks
P	Thomas Dorminy	Sioux Falls Canaries
P	Parker Harm	Fargo-Moorhead RedHawks
P	Chase Jessee	Sioux City Explorers
P	Cole LaLonde	Sioux Falls Canaries
P	Mitchell Lambson	Winnipeg Goldeyes
P	Tasker Strobel	Winnipeg Goldeyes
P	Jared Wetherbee	Sioux City Explorers
P	Ryder Yakel	Winnipeg Goldeyes
P	Christian Cosby (DNP)	Sioux Falls Canaries
P	Julian Garcia (DNP)	Kansas City Monarchs
C	Scott Combs	Sioux Falls Canaries
C	Juan Fernandez	Fargo-Moorhead RedHawks
INF	Jordan Barth	Sioux Falls Canaries
INF	Josh Bissonette	Kansas City Monarchs
INF	Drew Devine	Lincoln Saltdogs
INF	Calvin Estrada	Sioux Falls Canaries
INF	Robbie Glendinning	Kansas City Monarchs
INF	Matthew Warkentin	Winnipeg Goldeyes
INF	Jaylyn Williams	Kansas City Monarchs
OF	Danny Bautista	Lincoln Saltdogs
OF	Henry George	Sioux City Explorers
OF	Josh Rehwaldt	Sioux Falls Canaries
OF	Dillon Thomas	Fargo-Moorhead RedHawks
OF	Zac Vooletich	Sioux City Explorers
OF	Max Murphy (DNP)	Winnipeg Goldeyes

=== Postseason Awards ===
Award	Player	Team
Player of the Year	Calvin Estrada	Sioux Falls Canaries
Pitcher of the Year	Jake Dykhoff	Fargo-Moorhead RedHawks
Reliever of the Year	Felix Cepeda	Sioux City Explorers
Rookie Hitter of the Year	Henry Kusiak	Chicago Dogs
Rookie Pitcher of the Year	Luke Hansel	Lake Country DockHounds
Defensive Pitcher of the Year	Andy Armstrong	Kane County Cougars/Winnipeg Goldeyes
Manager of the Year	Steve Montgomery	Sioux City Explorers

=== Postseason All-Stars ===
Pos.	Player	Team
C	Chance Sisco	Chicago Dogs
1B	Kyle Martin	Cleburne Railroaders
2B	Brantley Bell	Chicago Dogs/Kansas City Monarchs
3B	Calvin Estrada	Sioux Falls Canaries
SS	Jordan Barth	Sioux Falls Canaries
OF	Henry George	Sioux City Explorers
OF	Dillon Thomas	Fargo-Moorhead RedHawks
OF	Josh Rehwaldt	Sioux Falls Canaries
UT	Todd Lott	Kane County Cougars
DH	Robbie Glendinning	Kansas City Monarchs
SP	Jake Dykhoff	Fargo-Moorhead RedHawks
RP	Felix Cepeda	Sioux City Explorers

== Playoffs ==
=== Playoff bracket ===
Division Playoff Series (best-of-three)
1	Lake Country DockHounds	0
2	Chicago Dogs	2
East
3	Kane County Cougars	2
4	Milwaukee Milkmen	1
1	Sioux City Explorers	1
3	Sioux Falls Canaries	2
West
2	Kansas City Monarchs	1
4	Fargo-Moorhead RedHawks	2

Division Championship Series (best-of-five)
Chicago Dogs	2
Kane County Cougars	3
Sioux Falls Canaries	3
Fargo-Moorhead RedHawks	2

American Association Championship Series (best-of-five)
Kane County Cougars	3
Sioux Falls Canaries	2

== Notable players ==
Former Major League Baseball players who played in the American Association in 2025

- Pitchers
- Jake Brentz (Kansas City)
- Casey Crosby (Kane County)
- Jake Diekman (Lincoln)
- Demarcus Evans (Cleburne/Gary)
- Ashton Goudeau (Kansas City)
- Robert Gsellman (Lake County)
- Blair Henley (Cleburne)
- Jair Jurrjens (Lincoln)
- Gabe Klobosits (Cleburne)
- Jeff Lindgren (Chicago)
- Kyle Lobstein (Lake County)
- Chris Mazza (Kane County)
- Jacob Nix (Lake County)
- Cody Reed (Gary)
- Zac Reininger (Winnipeg/Kansas City)
- Mike Shawaryn (Cleburne)
- Position Players
- Aaron Altherr (Cleburne)
- Armando Alvarez (Sioux City)
- Jorge Bonifacio (Kansas City)
- Jaylin Davis (Milwaukee)
- Yusniel Diaz (Lincoln)
- TJ Hopkins (Chicago)
- Shed Long Jr. (Cleburne)
- Jefry Marte (Milwaukee)
- John Nogowski (Sioux City)
- Eury Pérez (Lake County)
- Dustin Peterson (Cleburne)
- Brett Phillips (Kane County)
- Jacob Robson (Winnipeg)
- Blake Rutherford (Kansas City)
- Chance Sisco (Chicago)
- Dillon Thomas (Fargo)

Other notable players who played in the American Association in 2025

- Brett Conine (Lake Country)
- Hayden Dunhurst (Lake County)
- Robbie Glendinning (Kansas City)
- Chris Kwitzer (Cleburne)
- Kyle Martin (Cleburne)
- J. D. Scholten (Sioux City)
- Nick Shumpert (Sioux City)

== See also ==
- 2025 Major League Baseball season
- 2025 Pecos League season
