= 2020 American Association season =

15th annual season of American Association Baseball

- League: American Association of Professional Baseball
- Sport: Baseball
- Duration: July 3 – September 10 (Playoffs: September 12 – September 17)
- Games: 60
- Teams: 6

American Association Championship
- Champions: Milwaukee Milkmen
- Runners-up: Sioux Falls Canaries
- Finals MVP: Adam Brett Walker II

Seasons
- ← 2019 2021 →

The 2020 American Association season is the 15th season of professional baseball in the American Association of Professional Baseball (AA) since its creation in October 2005. Due to the COVID-19 global pandemic the league only field 6 teams and played a shortened season. The league held a dispersal draft of the players on the teams that did not take the field this season.

== Season schedule ==
Due to the COVID-19 pandemic the league looked for a way to play the season. The league fielded 6 teams for a 60 game schedule, using a 3 city hubs for home games. The hub cities selected were Fargo, Sioux Falls and Milwaukee. The week before the season started the Chicago Dogs were granted permission to play home games in Chicago. The Saint Paul Saints returned home August 4, 2021 The top two teams, The Milwaukee Milkmen and the Sioux Falls Canaries, competed in a best of 7 series for the championship. The Milkmen won the series 4-1.

== Dispersal draft ==
Team	Round 1	Round 2	Round 3	Round 4	Round 5	Round 6	Round 7	Round 8	Round 9
Milwaukee	Chase Simpson	Zach Nehrir	Dylan Tice	Dylan Baker	A.J. Schugel	Jack Alkire			
Sioux Falls	Alay Lago	Erik Manoah, Jr.	Austin Boyle	Michael Gunn	Ryan Long	Landon Holifield	Ricky Ramirez, Jr.		
Winnipeg	Darnell Sweeney	Frank Duncan	Jordan George	Thomas Walraven	Roy Morales	Kent Hasler	Mason Melotakis	Ryan Flores	John Nester
Chicago	Eric Stout	Carlos Diaz, Jr.	Andrew Mitchell	Jeff Thompson	Jason Seever	Jose Mesa, Jr.	Ben Yokley		
Fargo-Moorhead	Cito Culver	Dario Pizzano	Jake Cosart	Dylan Kelly	Tyler Wilsoon	Ryan Thurston	Mitchell Osnowitz	Forrest Allday	
St Paul	Chuck Taylor	Jameson McGrane	Rashad Crawford	Jose Velez	Matt Pobereyko				

== Regular season standings ==
Place	Team	Wins	Loses	Win%	GB
1	Milwaukee Milkmen	34	26	.567	—
2	Sioux Falls Canaries	31	27	.534	2
3	St. Paul Saints	30	30	.500	4
4	Winnipeg Goldeyes	29	31	.483	5
5	Fargo-Moorehead RedHawks	28	32	.467	6
6	Chicago Dogs	26	32	.448	7

== Statistical leaders ==
=== Hitting ===
Stat	Player	Team	Total
HR	Adam Brett Walker II	Milwaukee Milkmen	22
AVG	Correll Prime Drew Ward	Fargo-Moorhead RedHawks	.335
H	Correll Prime	Fargo-Moorhead RedHawks	83
RBIs	Kyle Martin	Winnipeg Goldeyes	51
SB	Michael Crouse	Chicago Dogs	20

=== Pitching ===
Stat	Player	Team	Total
W	Thomas Dorminy Tyler Herron	Chicago Dogs Sioux Falls Canaries	7
ERA	David Holmberg	Milwaukee Milkmen	2.34
SO	Mike Devine	St. Paul Saints	89
SV	Jameson McGrane Keaton Steele	St. Paul Saints Sioux Falls Canaries	16

== Notable players ==
Former Major League Baseball players who played in the American Association in 2020

== See also ==
- 2020 in baseball
- 2020 Major League Baseball season
- Impact of the COVID-19 pandemic on sports
