= Kyle Martin (first baseman) =

American baseball player (born 1992)

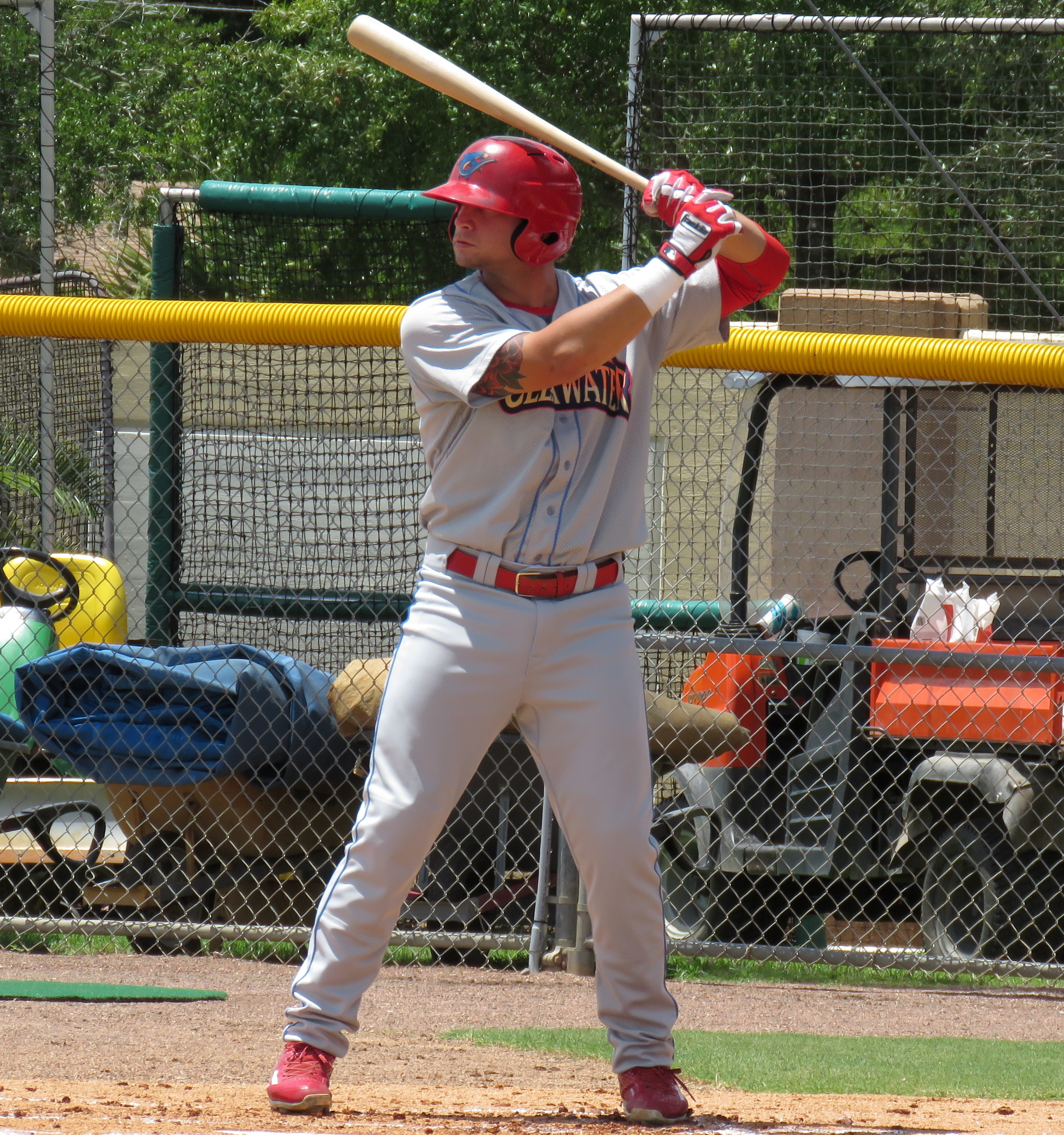
- Martin with the Clearwater Threshers in 2016

Cleburne Railroaders – No. 33
- First baseman
- Born: November 13, 1992 (age 33); Greenville, South Carolina, U.S.
- Bats: Left Throws: Left
- Stats at Baseball Reference
Medals
Men's baseball
Representing United States
WBSC Premier12
Silver medal – second place	2015 Tokyo	Team

Kyle J. Martin (born November 13, 1992) is an American professional baseball first baseman for the Cleburne Railroaders of the American Association of Professional Baseball. He was drafted by the Philadelphia Phillies in the fourth round of the 2015 Major League Baseball draft, and played in the 2015 WBSC Premier12.

== Career ==
=== Amateur career ===
Martin attended Wade Hampton High School in Greenville, South Carolina. He enrolled at the University of South Carolina and played college baseball for the South Carolina Gamecocks. The Los Angeles Angels of Anaheim selected Martin in the 20th round of the 2014 MLB draft, but he did not sign with the Angels, opting to return to South Carolina for his senior year. As a senior, Louisville Slugger named Martin a Second Team All-American.

=== Philadelphia Phillies ===
The Philadelphia Phillies selected Martin in the fourth round of the 2015 Major League Baseball (MLB) draft, and he signed with the Phillies. After signing, he was assigned to the Lakewood BlueClaws where he posted a .279 batting average with five home runs and 37 RBIs.

In 2016, Martin played for the Clearwater Threshers where he batted .250 with 19 home runs and 82 RBIs. In 2017, he played with the Reading Fightin Phils where he batted .193 with 22 home runs and 68 RBIs.

In the winter, Martin played for the Caimanes de Barranquilla of the Colombian Professional Baseball League. During the 2017–18 season he finished fourth in the LPB with nine doubles and won the Gold Glove as the league’s top defensive first baseman. He also participated in a promotional Home Run Derby event alongside other local and international players.

In 2018, with the Reading Fightin Phils and the Clearwater Threshers, he batted .198 with 10 home runs and 45 RBIs. Martin was released from the Phillies organization on May 28, 2019.

=== Winnipeg Goldeyes ===
On June 5, 2019, Martin signed with the Winnipeg Goldeyes of the American Association of Independent Professional Baseball. On January 28, 2020, Martin re-signed with Winnipeg. He led the league in RBIs with 51, while also belting 16 home runs in 60 games. He was named an American Association All-Star for the 2020 season.

On January 20, 2021, Martin again re-signed with the Goldeyes. He repeated as the league leader in RBIs with 106 and second in home runs with 31, which were both single-season franchise records for Winnipeg. He also earned a second-consecutive All-Star selection.

=== Guerreros de Oaxaca ===
On December 20, 2021, Martin's contract was purchased by the Guerreros de Oaxaca of the Mexican League. In 39 games, he batted .364/.480/.884 with a league-leading 18 home runs and 47 RBI. Martin also led all of professional baseball with a 1.365 OPS prior to his departure from the team.

=== San Diego Padres ===
On June 8, 2022, the San Diego Padres signed Martin to a minor league contract and assigned him to the Triple-A El Paso Chihuahuas. He played in 79 games for El Paso, hitting .257/.352/.529 with 17 home runs and 46 RBI. Martin elected free agency following the season on November 10.

=== Guerreros de Oaxaca (second stint) ===
On March 28, 2023, Martin re-signed with the Guerreros de Oaxaca of the Mexican League. In 86 games for the team, he batted .258/.363/.563 with 26 home runs and 75 RBI.

During the 2024 season, Martin appeared in 72 games for Guerreros de Oaxaca, hitting .278/.388/.553 with 21 home runs and 68 RBI. He was selected to the 2024 Mexican Baseball League All-Star Game, where he hit a home run and competed in the Home Run Derby, leading the field with 14 home runs through the first two rounds before falling to Yasiel Puig in the final.

=== Cleburne Railroaders ===
On January 28, 2025, Martin signed with the Cleburne Railroaders of the American Association of Professional Baseball. In 96 games, he hit .279/.368/.593 with 29 home runs, 90 RBI, and four stolen bases.

He led the league in runs scored (77), home runs (29), and RBI (90), earning his third American Association All-Star selection. He also won the Home Run Derby, defeating Robbie Glendinning in the finals.

=== York Revolution ===
On September 2, 2025, Martin was traded to the York Revolution of the Atlantic League of Professional Baseball in exchange for a player to be named later. In nine appearances for the Revolution, he batted .333/.395/.641 with two home runs, seven RBI, and one stolen base. With York, Martin won the Atlantic League championship.

=== Cleburne Railroaders (second stint) ===
On October 7, 2025, Martin was traded back to the Cleburne Railroaders to complete a prior transaction. Martin was also selected by the Texas Tailgaters in the fourth round (third pick) of the Banana Ball draft.

== Career statistics ==
Blue background indicates league leader.

=== LMB statistics ===
Year	Team	G	PA	AB	R	H	2B	3B	HR	RBI	SB	CS	BB	SO	BA
2022	Oaxaca	39	152	121	40	44	9	0	18	47	3	1	26	33	.364
2023	Oaxaca	86	380	318	61	82	13	3	26	75	0	1	50	120	.258
2024	Oaxaca	72	322	273	55	76	12	0	21	68	5	0	42	70	.278
Career		197	854	712	156	202	34	3	65	190	8	2	118	223	.284

=== LMP statistics – Winter league ===
Year	Team	G	PA	AB	R	H	2B	3B	HR	RBI	SB	CS	BB	SO	BA
2021–22	Navojoa	53	222	180	33	47	5	0	17	43	0	0	31	58	.261
2024–25	Mochis	48	200	170	23	26	4	0	6	28	0	0	26	60	.153
Career		101	422	350	56	73	9	0	23	71	0	0	57	118	.209

=== Independent statistics ===
Year	Team	Lg	G	PA	AB	R	H	2B	3B	HR	RBI	SB	CS	BB	SO	BA
2019	Winnipeg	AA	82	341	287	60	79	19	1	14	67	8	4	44	44	.275
2020	Winnipeg	AA	60	257	226	40	68	10	1	16	51	8	4	23	46	.301
2021	Winnipeg	AA	99	434	371	76	104	25	2	31	106	8	1	49	82	.280
2025	Cleburne	AA	96	410	351	77	98	21	1	29	90	4	0	45	79	.279
2025	York	ATLL	9	43	39	11	13	6	0	2	7	1	1	3	6	.333
Career			346	1,485	1,274	264	362	81	5	92	321	29	10	164	257	.284
