= Cleburne Railroaders =

American professional baseball team

- Logo

Information
- League: National Association of Professional Baseball (2027-Present)
- Location: Cleburne, Texas
- Ballpark: La Moderna Field
- Founded: 2017
- Former league: American Association of Professional Baseball (2017-2026)
- Colors: Railroad Navy, Texas Red, Spike Silver, Cleburne Blue
- Ownership: REV Entertainment
- General manager: Jimmy Frush
- Manager: Pete Incaviglia
- Website: railroaderbaseball.com

The Cleburne Railroaders are a professional baseball team based in Cleburne, Texas, that plays in the National Association of Professional Baseball, an official Partner League of Major League Baseball. The team, which began play in 2017, plays its home games at La Moderna Field.

== History ==
The history of professional baseball in Cleburne goes back to the original Cleburne Railroaders, which played in the Texas League, winning the 1906 league championship. However, this team lasted only one season. A second iteration of the Railroaders competed in the Texas–Oklahoma League in 1911-1912, winning the 1911 championship. They played their home games at Gorman's Park, now part of Hulen Park.

The modern Railroaders were announced as an expansion franchise in the American Association on October 6, 2016. The team plays in The Depot at Cleburne Station (now La Moderna Field), a new $25 million stadium that was recognized as a fan-favorite independent league stadium by Ballpark Digest in 2017.

On June 12, 2020, it was announced that the Railroaders were one of six teams that would go on hiatus during an abbreviated 2020 American Association season due to the COVID-19 pandemic in the United States.

In 2021, the Cleburne Railroaders announced three new additions to their ownership group: Neil Leibman, Alan Miller, and Jon Ryan. Leibman is the Texas Rangers Chief Operating Officer and President of Business Operations and owns multiple professional sports teams. Miller is the owner of COLLiDE Agency and Ryan is a former NFL player and are part owners of the Portland Pickles independent baseball team located in Oregon.

In 2023, the Railroaders announced a new majority partnership group, Railroaders Baseball Partners LLC, with REV Entertainment (the official events partner of the Texas Rangers) serving as managing partner for the team.

In 2026, REV Entertainment announced the Railroaders' intent to move to the National Association of Professional Baseball for the 2027 season.

== Branding and mascots ==
The Railroaders’ colors were originally orange and blue. In 2021, the team's colors were changed to reflect the red, blue, and white of the flag of Texas: “caboose red,” “steel rail blue,” and “whistle post white.” Additionally, the Railroaders also introduced a new mascot to their team, known as Gandy. Gandy joined Spike, the original mascot (a cartoon rail spike), in representing the Railroaders and what they stand for. Gandy's background is that he was a part of the Santa Fe railroad track maintenance gang. These maintenance gangs were known as Gandy Dancers because they would sing a variety of songs while they were working on the track.

Prior to the 2026 season, the Railroaders once again refreshed their branding and changed their primary colors to "Railroad Navy", "Texas Red", "Spike Silver", and "Cleburne Blue". The Gandy mascot was retired, and the Spike mascot was updated. The team also announced several new logos, along with its three jerseys for the season: White/Primary (home), Red/Heritage (away), and a new alternate Blue/Cleburne Pride.

== Season-by-season records ==
Cleburne Railroaders season records
Season	League	Division	Regular Season				Postseason			Manager	Ref
Season	League	Division	Record	Win%	Division	GB	Record	Win%	Result	Manager	Ref
2017	AA	South	47–53	.470	2nd	14.5	Did not qualify			Gabe Suárez	
2018	AA	South	33–66	.333	5th	37.5	Did not qualify			Gabe Suárez	
2019	AA	South	57–43	.570	3rd	1	Did not qualify			Brent Clevlen	
2020	AA	South	On hiatus due to the COVID-19 pandemic								
2021	AA	South	54–46	.540	2nd	15	0–1	.000	Lost Wild Card Game 4–0 to Sioux City Explorers	Mike Jeffcoat (19–18), Logan Watkins (35–28) (Note: On June 30, 2021, Jeffcoat announced his retirement and Watkins was named interim manager.)	
2022	AA	East	50–50	.500	4th	4	2–3	.400	Won East Division Semi Finals 2–1 to Kane County Cougars, Lost East Division Championship 2–0 to Milwaukee Milkmen	Logan Watkins	
2023	AA	East	46–54	.460	4th	10	1–2	.333	Lost East Division Semi Finals 2–0 to Chicago Dogs	Pete Incaviglia	
2024	AA	East	60–40	.600	1st	–	1–2	.333	Lost East Division Semi Finals 2–1 to Chicago Dogs	Pete Incaviglia	
2025	AA	East	43–57	.430	5th	12	Did not qualify			Pete Incaviglia	
2026	AA	East	49–51	.490	4th	7.5	1–2	.333	Lost East Division Semi Finals 2–1 to Milwaukee Milkmen	Pete Incaviglia	

== Roster ==
Cleburne Railroaders roster
Active (25-man) roster		Coaching staff
Pitchers: 10 Jaime Arias; 26 Bryce Bonnin; 18 Luke Boyd; 27 Taylor Broadway; 32 Derek Craft; 40 Trey Dillard; 24 Austin Faith; 37 Blair Henley; 12 Gabe Klobosits; 30 Cristian Lopez; 16 Kade Mechals; 39 Nick Paciorek; 28 Kristian Scott; 29 Mike Shawaryn; 31 Zeke Wood	Catchers: 23 Jacob Morrow; 21 Andres Sosa; Infielders: 3 Korry Howell; 4 Shed Long Jr.; 33 Kyle Martin; 13 Dustin Peterson; 1 Cooper Weiss; Outfielders: 34 Aaron Altherr; 7 Anthony Brocato; 2 Steven Rivas; 9 Lamar Sparks	Manager: 5 Pete Incaviglia; Coaches: 14 Brooks Carey (bench); 22 Billy Horn (pitching); 13 Rudy Jaramillo (hitting); Jacob Popoff (clubhouse manager); Arturo Valles (trainer); Disabled list; ‡ Inactive list; § Suspended list; updated May 8, 2025

== Notable alumni ==
- Mitch Glasser (2017)
- Shawn Zarraga (2017)
- Winston Abreu (2017)
- Preston Palmeiro (2018)
- Ryan Brett (2019)
- Nefi Ogando (2019)
- Daniel Robertson (2019)
- Bubby Rossman (2019)
- Ozzie Martínez (2021)
- Logan Verrett (2021)
- Jacob Rhame (2021)
- D. J. Peterson (2021)
- Michael Mariot (2021, 2023)
- Nick Gardewine (2021–2023)
- Nick Shumpert (2022)
- Héctor Sánchez (2022)
- Hunter Cervenka (2022)
- Kevin McCarthy (2022)
- Josh Lucas (2022)
- Zac Reininger (2022)
- Wyatt Mathisen (2022)
- Riley Smith (2023)
- Delino DeShields Jr. (2023)
- Bret Boswell (2023–present)
- Chris Muller (2024–present)
- Brian O'Grady (2024–present)
- Thomas Dillard (2024–present)
- Shed Long Jr. (2024–present)
- Trent Giambrone (2024)
- Seth Romero (2024)
- Beau Burrows (2024–present)
- Caleb Smith (2024–present)
