= 2024 Mexican Baseball League All-Star Game =

2024 Mexican League All-Star Game
Zona Norte	Zona Sur
5	2
	1	2	3	4	5	6	7	8	9	R	H	E
Zona Norte	0	0	1	2	0	2	0	0	0	5	12	0
Zona Sur	0	2	0	0	0	0	0	2	0	2	6	0
- Date: 25 May 2024
- Venue: Estadio Universitario Beto Ávila
- City: Veracruz
- Attendance: 7,500

The 2024 Mexican League All-Star Game was the 90th All-Star Game of the Mexican League (LMB). The game was played between the Zona Norte (North Zone) and the Zona Sur (South Zone) on 25 May 2024. The game was hosted by El Águila de Veracruz of the Zona Sur at Estadio Universitario Beto Ávila in Veracruz.

The Zona Norte team, led by manager José Molina, won the game 5–2, defeating the Zona Sur team, led by manager Sergio Omar Gastélum.

== Background ==
=== Host selection ===
Veracruz was announced as the host of the 2024 Mexican League All-Star Game on 17 June 2023. It marked the fourth time the city hosted the event and the second at the Estadio Universitario Beto Ávila, which previously staged the 75th edition in 2007.

=== Roster selections ===
The starting rosters for each team’s position players were determined by fan balloting, which also selected each team’s captains for the first time in history. Pitchers were selected by the team managers: José Molina of the Algodoneros de Unión Laguna (Zona Norte) and Sergio Omar Gastélum of the Pericos de Puebla (Zona Sur), whose clubs were the previous season’s zone champions.

The North Zone roster was presented on 14 May 2025 and the South Zone roster was announced on 15 May 2025.

On 24 May 2024, it was announced that, in order to protect participating players, the game would be limited to nine innings and that no extra innings would be played in the event of a tie.

== Rosters ==
=== Zona Norte ===
Starters
Position	Player	Team
C	(United States) Logan Moore	Monclova
1B	(United States) Greg Bird	Jalisco
2B	(Mexico) Ramiro Peña	Monterrey
3B	(United States) James Nelson	Durango
SS	(Curaçao) Didi Gregorius	Unión Laguna
LF	(Mexico) Fernando Villegas	Saltillo
CF	(Venezuela) Ángel Reyes	Aguascalientes
RF	(United States) Nick Torres	Unión Laguna
DH	(Puerto Rico) Kennys Vargas	Dos Laredos

Reserves
Position	Player	Team
C	(United States) Justin O'Conner	Aguascalientes
C	(United States) Saúl Garza	Tijuana
IF	(Venezuela) Leobaldo Piña^{[A]}	Chihuahua
IF	(Mexico) Missael Rivera^{[B]}	Saltillo
IF	(Mexico) Roberto Valenzuela	Monterrey
OF	(United States) Anthony Giansanti	Jalisco
OF	(Cuba) Yadiel Hernández	Dos Laredos

Pitchers
Player	Team
(Dominican Republic) Fernando Abad	Saltillo
(Dominican Republic) Neftalí Feliz	Durango
(Mexico) Ariel Gracia	Chihuahua
(United States) Jeff Ibarra	Unión Laguna
(United States) Jake Jewell	Unión Laguna
(Cuba) Yoan López	Unión Laguna
(United States) Thomas McIlraith	Unión Laguna
(United States) Zach Mort^{[C]}	Saltillo
(Dominican Republic) Oddy Núñez	Aguascalientes
(United States) Roel Ramírez	Tijuana
(United States) Stephen Tarpley	Monterrey
(Venezuela) José Torres	Unión Laguna
(United States) Luke Westphal^{[D]}	Tijuana
(United States) Taylor Williams	Unión Laguna

=== Zona Sur ===
Starters
Position	Player	Team
C	(Mexico) Juan Kirk	Puebla
1B	(United States) Kyle Martin	Oaxaca
2B	(Dominican Republic) Robinson Canó	México
3B	(United States) Drew Stankiewicz	Puebla
SS	(Dominican Republic) Cristhian Adames	Puebla
LF	(Mexico) Miguel Guzmán^{[E]}	Puebla
CF	(Venezuela) Franklin Barreto	México
RF	(United States) Peter O'Brien	Puebla
DH	(United States) Luke Voit	Tabasco

Reserves
Position	Player	Team
C	(Venezuela) Yorman Rodríguez	León
IF	(Venezuela) Alexi Amarista	Oaxaca
IF	(United States) Art Charles	Yucatán
IF	(Mexico) Ángel Erro	Tigres
IF	(Mexico) Juan Carlos Gamboa	México
OF	(Mexico) Julián Ornelas	México
OF	(Cuba) Yasiel Puig	Veracruz

Pitchers
Player	Team
(Colombia) Elkin Alcalá	Puebla
(Japan) Tomohiro Anraku	México
(United States) Trevor Bauer	México
(Dominican Republic) Wendolyn Bautista	León
(Mexico) Esteban Bloch	Oaxaca
(Mexico) Juan Cosío	Tigres
(Dominican Republic) Julián Fernández	Veracruz
(Dominican Republic) Jhan Mariñez	Querétaro
(Mexico) David Reyes	Veracruz
(Dominican Republic) Ramón Rosso	Campeche
(Mexico) Fernando Salas	Tabasco
(United States) Nick Struck^{[F]}	Tabasco
(United States) C. D. Pelham^{[G]}	Yucatán
(Dominican Republic) Gabriel Ynoa	Puebla

==== Roster notes ====
1. Leobaldo Piña was named as the roster replacement for Wilfredo Tovar.
2. Missael Rivera was named as the roster replacement for Jonathan Schoop due to injury.
3. Zach Mort was named as the roster replacement for Jorge Pérez.
4. Luke Westphal was named as the roster replacement for R. J. Alaniz.
5. Miguel Guzmán was named as the roster replacement for Tomo Otosaka due to injury.
6. Nick Struck was named as the roster replacement for Ángel Sánchez.
7. C. D. Pelham was named as the roster replacement for César Valdez.

== Game summary ==
=== Starting lineup ===
Zona Norte
Order	Player	Team	Position
1	(Mexico) Ramiro Peña	Sultanes	2B
2	(United States) Nick Torres	Unión Laguna	RF
3	(Curaçao) Didi Gregorius	Unión Laguna	SS
4	(Puerto Rico) Kennys Vargas	Dos Laredos	DH
5	(Mexico) Fernando Villegas	Saltillo	LF
6	(United States) Greg Bird	Jalisco	1B
7	(Venezuela) Ángel Reyes	Aguascalientes	CF
8	(United States) Logan Moore	Monclova	C
9	(United States) James Nelson	Durango	3B
—	(United States) Zach Mort	Saltillo	P

Zona Sur
Order	Player	Team	Position
1	(Venezuela) Franklin Barreto	México	CF
2	(Mexico) Miguel Guzmán	Puebla	LF
3	(Dominican Republic) Robinson Canó	México	2B
4	(United States) Luke Voit	Tabasco	DH
5	(United States) Kyle Martin	Oaxaca	1B
6	(United States) Peter O'Brien	Puebla	RF
7	(Dominican Republic) Cristhian Adames	Puebla	SS
8	(Mexico) Juan Kirk	Puebla	C
9	(United States) Drew Stankiewicz	Puebla	3B
—	(United States) Trevor Bauer	México	P

=== Line score ===
25 May 2024 18:18 (CDT) Estadio Universitario Beto Ávila in Veracruz
Team	1	2	3	4	5	6	7	8	9	R	H	E
Zona Norte	0	0	1	2	0	2	0	0	0	5	12	0
Zona Sur	0	1	0	0	0	0	0	1	0	2	6	0
Starting pitchers: Norte: Zach Mort; Sur: Trevor Bauer; WP: Ariel Gracia (1–0) LP: Ramón Rosso (0–1) Sv: Thomas McIlraith (1); Home runs: Norte: None; Sur: Kyle Martin (1), Ángel Erro (1); Attendance: 7,500 Time: 2:57; Boxscore
