= Houston Apollos (baseball) =

- Logo

Information
- League: American Association of Professional Baseball (2021) (South Division)
- Location: Houston, Texas
- Ballpark: None
- Founded: 2002
- Disbanded: 2021
- Former leagues: Pecos League (2012-2020); Big States League (2002-2006)
- Former ballpark: Coastal Baseball Pak
- Colors: Yellow, blue
- Ownership: Andrew Dunn
- Manager: David Peterson
- Website: Official website

The Houston Apollos were a professional baseball team based in Houston, Texas, that most recently played in the American Association of Professional Baseball, an official Partner League of Major League Baseball. They played from 2002 to 2021.

== History ==
The Apollos played in the Big States League until 2006. The Apollos also played in the MSBL, Bama Bash, New Orleans Classic, Alamo Cup, Stan Musial World Series, NBC World Series, and Coastal Baseball League. The Apollos were mainstays in tournaments in Louisiana and Alabama in the late 2000s.

In 2009, the Houston Apollos were invited by Ron Baron of the Continental League to go into independent professional baseball. The Apollos did not accept, and the Coastal Kingfish took their place. The Apollos have played in the Pecos Spring League since 2012.

In 2021, Houston Apollos joined the American Association of Professional Baseball, an official Partner League of Major League Baseball, as a traveling, twelfth team. They finished the season with the worst record in the league by a comfortable margin, and with the addition of an expansion team in Oconomowoc, Wisconsin for the 2022 season, the Apollos are now seeking a new league.

== Retired numbers ==
- 42, Jackie Robinson, retired throughout baseball

== Season-by-season results ==
Stats before 2013 are unknown

Year	W	L	T
2013	4	0	-
2014	3	0	1
2015	2	1	-
2016	3	0	-
2017	4	1	-
