= Darnell Sweeney =

American baseball player (born 1991)

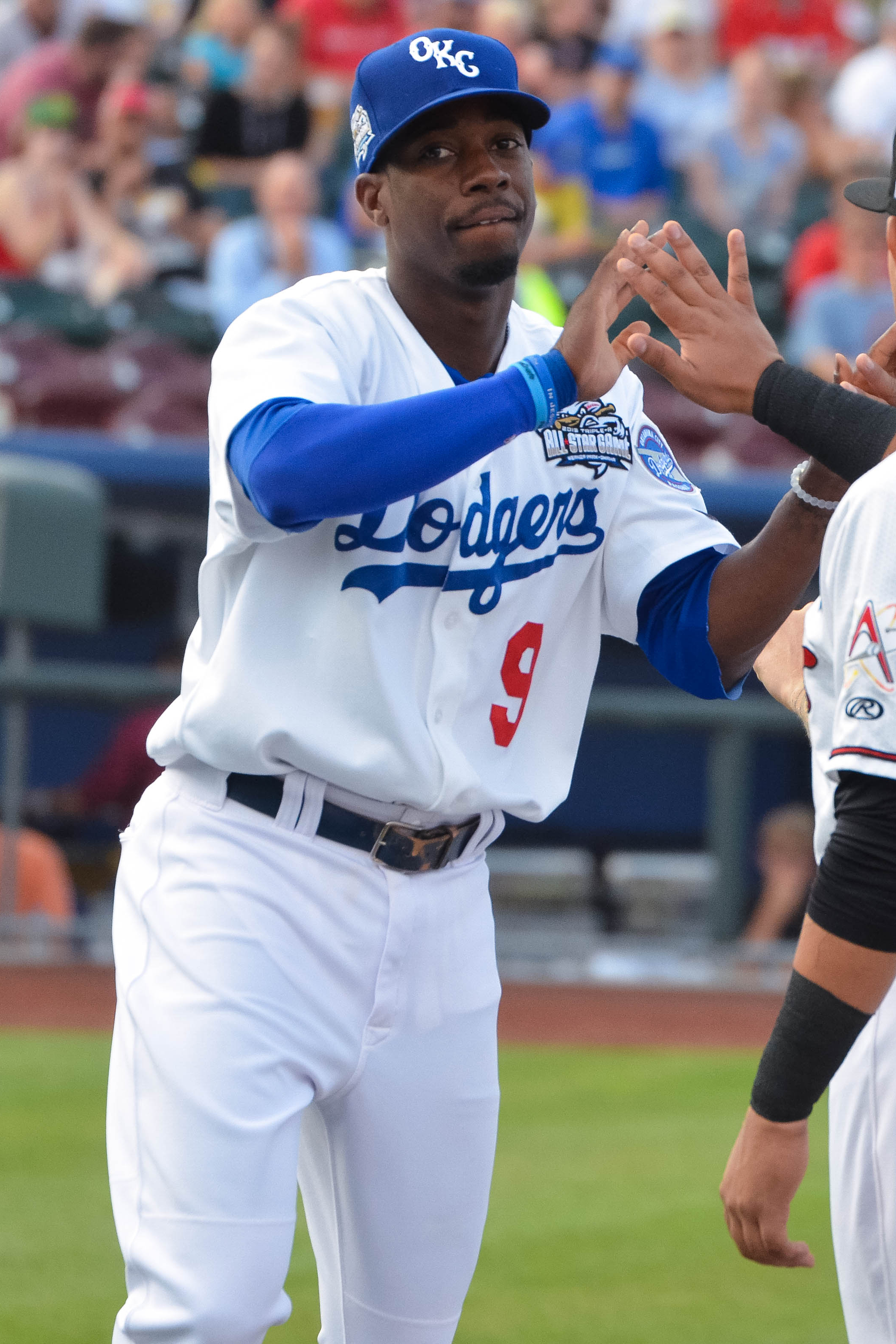
- Sweeney with the Oklahoma City Dodgers at the 2015 Triple-A All-Star Game
- Utility player
- Born: February 1, 1991 (age 35); Carver Ranches, Florida, U.S.
- Batted: Switch Threw: Right

MLB debut
- August 20, 2015, for the Philadelphia Phillies

Last MLB appearance
- August 1, 2018, for the Toronto Blue Jays

MLB statistics
- Batting average: .172
- Home runs: 3
- Runs batted in: 11
- Stats at Baseball Reference

Teams
- Philadelphia Phillies (2015); Toronto Blue Jays (2018)

Darnell Thomas Sweeney (born February 1, 1991) is an American former professional baseball utility player. He played in Major League Baseball (MLB) for the Philadelphia Phillies and Toronto Blue Jays.

== Early life and amateur career ==
Sweeney's father, a native of the British Virgin Islands, tutored Sweeney in baseball from the age of four and taught him to switch hit.

Sweeney attended Fort Lauderdale High School for the 2005–2006 school year. Due to relocation Darnell finished off his prep career at American Senior High School. He was drafted in the 41st round of the 2009 MLB draft by the Florida Marlins but did not sign.

Sweeney attended college at the University of Central Florida (UCF), where he played college baseball for the UCF Knights. Sweeney had committed to play for UCF before receiving a scholarship offer from Miami and chose to honor his commitment to UCF. He was selected to the Conference USA All-Freshman Team with a .358 batting average, 83 hits and 17 stolen bases. As a junior he was named to the Coral Gables All-Regional Team and was a Conference USA Preseason First Teamer. In 2011, he played collegiate summer baseball with the Harwich Mariners of the Cape Cod Baseball League.

== Professional career ==
=== Los Angeles Dodgers ===
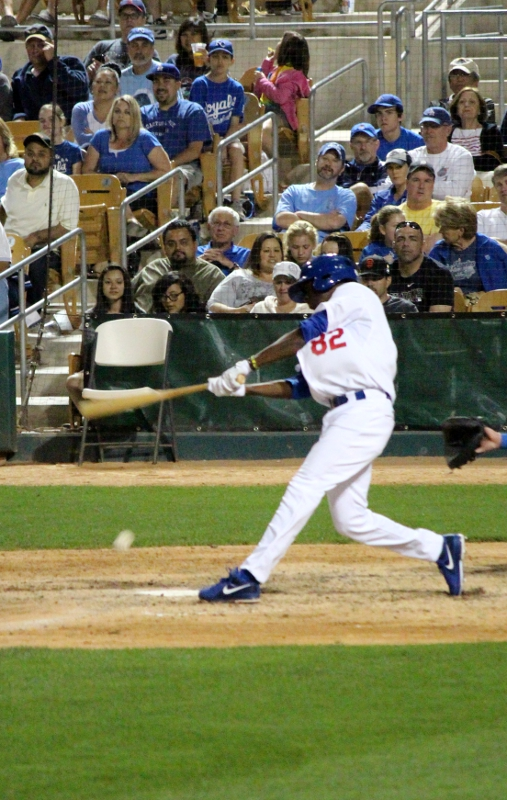
Darnell Sweeney in spring training with the Dodgers

The Los Angeles Dodgers selected Sweeney in the 13th round, with the 416th overall pick, of the 2012 MLB draft. In 2012 with the Ogden Raptors of the Pioneer League he hit .303 and stole 10 bases in 16 games. On July 8, 2012, he was called up to the Great Lakes Loons of the Midwest League. There, Sweeney hit .291 with 23 RBI, 5 home runs and 17 17 stolen bases over 51 games. In 2013 with the Rancho Cucamonga Quakes of the California League, he hit .275 in 134 games with 11 home runs, 75 RBI and 48 stolen bases. Sweeney was promoted to the Double-A Chattanooga Lookouts for the 2014 season. He was selected to the mid-season Southern League All-Star Game. In 132 games, he hit .288 with 14 homers and 57 RBI. After the season, he played with the Glendale Desert Dogs in the Arizona Fall League and was selected to the AFL Top Prospects List. The Dodgers invited Sweeney to attend major league spring training in 2015. He was assigned to the Triple-A Oklahoma City Dodgers and selected to the mid-season all-star team.

=== Philadelphia Phillies ===
On August 19, 2015, Sweeney and fellow minor leaguer John Richy were traded to the Philadelphia Phillies in exchange for Chase Utley. The Phillies immediately added Sweeney to the major league roster. He made his MLB debut August 20 as a pinch hitter. His first major league hit – a home run – came on August 22 in Miami against the Marlins.

=== Los Angeles Dodgers (second stint) ===
On November 11, 2016, he was traded back to the Dodgers (along with Darin Ruf) in exchange for Howie Kendrick and was assigned to Oklahoma City to begin the season. In 38 games for Oklahoma City in 2017, he slashed .227/.290/.412 with four home runs and 15 RBI.

=== Cincinnati Reds ===
On May 27, 2017, Sweeney was traded to the Cincinnati Reds in exchange for future considerations. He played in 81 games for the Triple–A Louisville Bats, slashing .281/.355/.420 with seven home runs, 29 RBI, 11 RBI. Sweeney was released by the Reds organization on March 31, 2018.

=== Toronto Blue Jays ===
On April 3, 2018, Sweeney signed a minor league contract with the Toronto Blue Jays, and was assigned to the Triple-A Buffalo Bisons. He was called up by the Blue Jays on June 29 to replace Steve Pearce, who had been traded to the Boston Red Sox. He was outrighted to Triple-A on July 5, 2018. Sweeney was recalled by the Blue Jays on July 31, and designated for assignment on August 2. He elected free agency on October 2.

=== Kansas City T-Bones ===
On February 12, 2019, Sweeney signed with the Kansas City T-Bones of the American Association of Independent Professional Baseball. In 23 games for Kansas City, he hit .288/.430/.538 with four home runs, nine RBI and six stolen bases.

=== Pittsburgh Pirates ===
On June 12, 2019, Sweeney's contract was purchased by the Pittsburgh Pirates organization. In 45 games split between the Double–A Altoona Curve and Triple–A Indianapolis Indians, he hit a combined .214/.272/.364 with four home runs and 18 RBI. Sweeney elected free agency following the season on November 4.

=== Winnipeg Goldeyes ===
On January 31, 2020, Sweeney re-signed with the Kansas City T-Bones of the American Association of Independent Professional Baseball. However, the T-Bones were not selected to compete in the condensed 60-game season due to the COVID-19 pandemic. He was later drafted by the Winnipeg Goldeyes in the 2020 dispersal draft. In 60 games he hit .277/.355/.521 with 14 home runs, 38 RBI and 14 stolen bases.

=== Kansas City Monarchs ===
Sweeney was returned to the Kansas City T-Bones after the 2020 season on September 11, 2020. The team changed their name to the Kansas City Monarchs in the offseason. Sweeney played in 97 games for Kansas City in 2021, slashing .262/.354/.484 with 19 home runs, 69 RBI, and 22 stolen bases.

Sweeney played in 92 games for the Monarchs in 2022, being named an All-Star after posting a .321/.410/.490 slash line with 13 home runs, 49 RBI, and 31 stolen bases. He was released on October 27, 2022.

=== Sioux Falls Canaries ===
On May 2, 2023, Sweeney signed with the Sioux Falls Canaries of the American Association of Professional Baseball. In 98 games for the Canaries, he batted .283/.390/.508 with 19 home runs, 57 RBI, and 20 stolen bases. In addition, Sweeney was named an All–Star for the Canaries during the season.

=== Pericos de Puebla ===
On January 2, 2024, Sweeney signed with the Pericos de Puebla of the Mexican League. In five games for Puebla, he went 0–for–2 with a stolen base. On April 22, Sweeney was released by the Pericos.

On May 18, 2024, Sweeney announced his retirement from professional baseball via Instagram.

== Coaching career ==
Following his retirement, Sweeney served as the hitting coach for the State College Spikes of the MLB Draft League. On July 20, 2024, Sweeney accepted a position to serve as a hitting instructor for the Philadelphia Phillies' rookie–level affiliate, the Florida Complex League Phillies.

In 2026, Sweeney was named as hitting coach of the Jersey Shore BlueClaws the High-A affiliate of the Philadelphia Phillies.
