= American Association of Professional Baseball =

North American professional baseball league

- Current season, competition or edition: 2026 American Association season
- Classification: Independent baseball
- Sport: Baseball
- Founded: 2005
- First season: 2006
- Commissioner: Joshua Schaub
- No. of teams: 10 (11 in 2028)
- Countries: United States; Canada
- Confederation: WBSC Americas
- Most recent champion: Kansas City Monarchs (2026)
- Most titles: Kansas City Monarchs (4)
- Related competitions: Baseball Champions League Americas
- Website: aabaseball.com

The American Association of Professional Baseball is an independent professional baseball league founded in 2005. It operates in the central United States and Canada, mostly in cities not served by organized baseball (Major League Baseball teams or their minor league affiliates). The league's level of play is comparable to High-A in organized baseball. League offices are located in Moorhead, Minnesota, and Joshua Schaub is the current league commissioner. Though a separate legal entity, the league shared a commissioner and director of umpires with the Can-Am League during the latter league's existence. The American Association of Professional Baseball has 501(c)(6) tax-exempt status with the Internal Revenue Service. In 2020, as part of MLB's reorganization of the minor leagues, the American Association, Atlantic League, Pioneer League and National Association (Formerly the Frontier League) became official MLB Partner Leagues, joining MLB in promoting the sport across North America, particularly in areas not served by organized baseball.

== History ==
The American Association (AA) was founded in October 2005 when the St. Paul Saints, Lincoln Saltdogs, Sioux City Explorers, and Sioux Falls Canaries announced they were leaving the Northern League. Around the same time, the Central Baseball League announced it was disbanding after four seasons; the league's Fort Worth Cats, Shreveport-Bossier Sports, Pensacola Pelicans, Coastal Bend Aviators, and El Paso Diablos joined the four former Northern League teams and the expansion St. Joe Blacksnakes to form the AA as a ten-team league. The new league began play in 2006, with a 96-game schedule, since expanded to 100 games.

2008 saw the AA lose the Blacksnakes and Aviators, with the Grand Prairie AirHogs and Wichita Wingnuts joining in their place. Following the 2010 season, four more Northern League franchises (the Fargo-Moorhead RedHawks, Gary SouthShore RailCats, Kansas City T-Bones, and Winnipeg Goldeyes) left the Northern League as its stability came into question and joined the AA. In 2011 and 2012 the league went through a significant shift. Fort Worth had its membership revoked and moved to the North American League, while Shreveport and Pensacola both relocated. The Pelicans moved to Amarillo, Texas, and became the Amarillo Sox (later the Amarillo Thunderheads) while Shreveport, who had changed their name to the Shreveport-Bossier Captains, moved to Laredo, Texas and became the Laredo Lemurs. The AA also reorganized into North, Central, and South Divisions; Fargo-Moorhead, Sioux Falls, St. Paul, and Winnipeg comprised the North, Gary SouthShore, Kansas City, Lincoln, Sioux City, and Wichita the Central, and Amarillo, El Paso, Fort Worth, Grand Prairie, and Shreveport the South Division. The top finishers in each of the three divisions earned automatic playoff berths, with the team with the next-best record that was not a division winner receiving a wild card spot.

For the 2012 season, the AA began interleague play with the Can-Am League. The two leagues were both headquartered in Durham, North Carolina, and both had Miles Wolff as their commissioner. This was similar to interleague play in MLB, but the AA and Can-Am League were separate legal entities and had separate playoffs and championships.

At the end of the 2013 season, due to the Tucson Padres relocating to El Paso, the Diablos suspended operations. The team was eventually revived and relocated, operating as the Joplin Blasters in the South Division. The Blasters ceased operations after the conclusion of the 2016 season.

On November 19, 2015, Miles Wolff announced that there would no longer be interleague play. It also was announced that the AA would become a 12-team league, with the Amarillo Thunderheads and Grand Prairie AirHogs operating as a joint team called the Texas AirHogs, playing 25 games in Amarillo and 25 games in Grand Prairie Shortly before the 2017 season, the Laredo Lemurs withdrew from the league. They were temporarily replaced by the Salina Stockade from the Pecos League for the season. The AirHogs played in Grand Prairie full-time in 2017, and the Cleburne Railroaders joined the league the same season.

The Chicago Dogs joined the league in 2018 The league, now composed of twelve teams, again realigned, with Chicago, Fargo-Moorhead, Gary SouthShore, Sioux Falls, St. Paul, and Winnipeg in the North Division, and Cleburne, Kansas City, Lincoln, Sioux City, Texas, and Wichita in the South Division. The Milwaukee Milkmen joined for 2019, replacing the Wichita Wingnuts, which folded in large part due to the demolition of Lawrence-Dumont Stadium and their eventual replacement by the affiliated Wichita Wind Surge.

In 2020, due to the COVID-19 pandemic, the league announced that 6 of its 12 clubs would play an abbreviated 60-game season beginning on July 3, 2020. Five stadiums were used for gameplay: Sioux Falls Stadium (hosting the Sioux Falls Canaries and St. Paul Saints during July), Newman Outdoor Field (hosting the Fargo-Moorhead RedHawks and Winnipeg Goldeyes), Franklin Field (hosting the Milwaukee Milkmen), Impact Field (hosting the Chicago Dogs), and CHS Field (hosting the St. Paul Saints beginning in August). Players from non-participating teams had the opportunity to be drafted by one of the six active clubs. A limited number of fans were allowed to attend games, in accordance with local government guidelines and restrictions.

The 2021 season saw the league lose both the AirHogs, who dropped out of the league, and the Saints, who moved to affiliated ball as the Triple-A affiliate of the Minnesota Twins. Joining the league in 2021 were the Kane County Cougars, who were dropped from affiliated ball during the 2021 minor league reorganization, as well as the Houston Apollos, who were a traveling team for the 2021 campaign.

In May 2021, the league announced the approval of Lake Country Baseball, based in Oconomowoc, Wisconsin, as a new member of the league starting in 2022. Construction commenced later that summer on a new stadium and multi-use indoor sports facility, which opened for play on May 20, 2022, as Wisconsin Brewing Company Park. The team selected the name Lake Country DockHounds, after hosting an online name the team contest.

With the DockHounds joining the league for the 2022 season, the AA again realigned its divisions. Going away from the prior North/South divisions, the league decided to go with East/West divisions. The league placed Chicago, Cleburne, Gary SouthShore, Kane County, Lake Country, and Milwaukee in the East Division; and Fargo-Moorhead, Kansas City, Lincoln, Sioux City, Sioux Falls, and Winnipeg in the West Division. The league also changed the playoff format. The top four teams in each division make the playoffs, and the team in each division with the best record is allowed to choose their first-round opponent from the remaining three division teams.

On August 13, 2026, the league announced a return to the Minneapolis–Saint Paul area beginning in the 2028 season with a team based in Blaine, Minnesota, a northern suburb of Minneapolis. The as-yet unnamed team is set to play at a 5,000-seat stadium situated within a 70-acre, $750 million development. On September 30, it was announced that the Cleburne Railroaders and Kane County Cougars would be leaving the AA to join the National Association of Professional Baseball (formerly the Frontier League); the parent company which owns the Railroaders and Cougars, REV Entertainment (a wholly-owned subsidiary of the Texas Rangers organization), also owns the league's Schaumburg Boomers as well as the Atlantic League's Long Island Ducks.

== Business model ==
The AA typically recruits college and former major and minor league players. Some former college players who join the AA chose not to enter or were not picked in the MLB draft, but want to continue to play professionally, be seen by major league scouts, and possibly get signed by MLB organizations. Former affiliated-league players that played at all levels of organized baseball sometimes join the AA after being released, injured, or having other circumstances as a way to be seen by scouts from MLB organizations and potentially be re-signed. For example, David Peralta was signed in 2004 as a pitcher for the St. Louis Cardinals, but suffered injuries and was released in 2009. He resurrected his career as an outfielder with teams such as the AA's Wichita Wingnuts and Amarillo Sox in 2012 and 2013, then became a starting outfielder for the Arizona Diamondbacks. Other former MLB players join the AA to stay involved in baseball after their MLB career, often as coaches and managers.

=== Players ===
Team rosters are limited to between 20 and 25 players, with up to an additional two on the injured list. The league counts a "year of service" as 75 or more at-bats or 30 or more innings pitched in any MLB-sponsored or independent league during the prior season, except that a player's first two years of service in an independent or short-season league counts as one year of service for AA purposes. The league's deputy commissioner is empowered to set the classifications and salary levels of foreign players. A maximum of six players on each team may be veterans, and a minimum of five must be rookies or LS-1. Of the remaining players, a maximum of six may be LS-4, and up to two of the LS-4 players may have LS-5 status. Teams with 22 players must have a minimum of four rookies or LS-1, while teams with 21 or fewer players must have a minimum of three rookies or LS-1.

- Rookie: A player with less than one year of service.
- LS-1: A player with less than two years of service.
- LS-2: A player with less than three years of service.
- LS-3: A player with less than four years of service.
- LS-4: A player with less than five years of service.
- LS-5: A player with less than six years of service.
- Veteran: A player with six or more years of service. If a player has six or more years of service but has not turned 27 by September 1 of that season, he will be considered an LS-4, while if he has not turned 25 by September 1 of that season, he will be considered an LS-3.

== Teams ==
=== Map of teams ===
Locations of teams in the East and West divisions. indicates future locations.

=== Current teams ===
American Association of Professional Baseball
Division	Team	Founded	Joined	City	Stadium	Capacity
East	Chicago Dogs	2018		Rosemont, Illinois	Impact Field	8,300
East	Gary SouthShore RailCats	2002	2011	Gary, Indiana	U.S. Steel Yard	6,139
East	Kansas City Monarchs	2003	2011	Kansas City, Kansas	Legends Field	6,537
East	Lake Country DockHounds	2022		Oconomowoc, Wisconsin	Wisconsin Brewing Company Park	3,641
East	Milwaukee Milkmen	2019		Franklin, Wisconsin	Franklin Field	4,000
West	Fargo-Moorhead RedHawks	1996	2011	Fargo, North Dakota	Newman Outdoor Field	4,513
West	Lincoln Saltdogs	2001	2006	Lincoln, Nebraska	Haymarket Park	8,486
West	Sioux City Explorers	1993	2006	Sioux City, Iowa	Lewis and Clark Park	3,800
West	Sioux Falls Canaries	1993	2006	Sioux Falls, South Dakota	Sioux Falls Stadium	5,462
West	Winnipeg Goldeyes	1994	2011	Winnipeg, Manitoba	Blue Cross Park	7,461

Future teams
Team	Founded	Joining	City	Stadium	Capacity
Blaine AAPB Team	2026	2028	Blaine, Minnesota	The Farm	5,000

=== League timeline ===
League member Former team Other league

=== Former teams ===
- Amarillo Thunderheads – originally the Amarillo Sox; merged with the Grand Prairie AirHogs prior to the 2016 season and changed name to Texas AirHogs
- Cleburne Railroaders – moved to the National Association of Professional Baseball following the 2026 season
- Coastal Bend Aviators – founding member, originally from Central Baseball League; folded after 2007
- El Paso Diablos – suspended operations after the 2013 season to make way for the Triple-A El Paso Chihuahuas; resumed operations in 2015 as the Joplin Blasters
- Fort Worth Cats – founding member; its membership was revoked on October 26, 2011, after it failed to provide the league with a letter of credit; moved to the North American League, then United League Baseball; later folded
- Houston Apollos – travelling team from the Pecos League brought in for the 2021 season
- Joplin Blasters – folded following the 2016 season
- Kane County Cougars – moved to the National Association of Professional Baseball following the 2026 season
- Laredo Lemurs – folded following the 2016 season
- Pensacola Pelicans – founding member of league originally from Central Baseball League; later became the Amarillo Sox
- St. Joe Blacksnakes – founding member; folded after 2007
- St. Paul Saints – founding member; became the Triple-A affiliate of the Minnesota Twins following the 2020 season, joining the International League
- Salina Stockade – moved to the Can-Am League as a partial-schedule traveling team following the 2017 season
- Shreveport-Bossier Captains – moved to Laredo, Texas, to become Laredo Lemurs
- Texas AirHogs – did not play the 2020 season due to the COVID-19 pandemic; folded after the season
- Wichita Wingnuts – suspended operations following the 2018 season as their ballpark was to be demolished to make way for a new ballpark and the Double-A Wichita Wind Surge; many players and staff members were transferred to the Cleburne Railroaders for the 2019 season and beyond

== Miles Wolff Cup Championship ==
In the postseason, the eight playoff clubs play in a best-of-three division series, with the top team in each division allowed to choose its first-round opponent. The four division series winners then play in a pair of best-of-five division championship series. The two division winners meet in the best-of-five Miles Wolff Cup finals to determine the American Association champion.

Season	Winner	Runner-up	Series result
2006	Fort Worth Cats	St. Paul Saints	3–2
2007	Fort Worth Cats	St. Paul Saints	3–2
2008	Sioux Falls Canaries	Grand Prairie AirHogs	3–1
2009	Lincoln Saltdogs	Pensacola Pelicans	3–2
2010	Shreveport-Bossier Captains	Sioux Falls Pheasants	3–0
2011	Grand Prairie AirHogs	St. Paul Saints	3–2
2012	Winnipeg Goldeyes	Wichita Wingnuts	3–0
2013	Gary SouthShore RailCats	Wichita Wingnuts	3–1
2014	Wichita Wingnuts	Lincoln Saltdogs	3–0
2015	Laredo Lemurs	Sioux City Explorers	3–1
2016	Winnipeg Goldeyes	Wichita Wingnuts	3–2
2017	Winnipeg Goldeyes	Wichita Wingnuts	3–2
2018	Kansas City T-Bones	St. Paul Saints	3–1
2019	St. Paul Saints	Sioux City Explorers	3–0
2020	Milwaukee Milkmen	Sioux Falls Canaries	4–1
2021	Kansas City Monarchs	Fargo-Moorhead RedHawks	3–0
2022	Fargo-Moorhead RedHawks	Milwaukee Milkmen	3–2
2023	Kansas City Monarchs	Chicago Dogs	3–1
2024	Kane County Cougars	Winnipeg Goldeyes	3–0
2025	Kane County Cougars	Sioux Falls Canaries	3–2
2026	Kansas City Monarchs	Milwaukee Milkmen	3–0

American Association championships
Team	Number	Years
Kansas City T-Bones/Monarchs	4	2018, 2021, 2023, 2026
Winnipeg Goldeyes	3	2012, 2016, 2017
Fort Worth Cats	2	2006, 2007
Kane County Cougars	2	2024, 2025
Sioux Falls Canaries	1	2008
Lincoln Saltdogs	1	2009
Shreveport-Bossier Captains	1	2010
Grand Prairie AirHogs	1	2011
Gary SouthShore RailCats	1	2013
Wichita Wingnuts	1	2014
Laredo Lemurs	1	2015
St. Paul Saints	1	2019
Milwaukee Milkmen	1	2020
Fargo-Moorhead RedHawks	1	2022

== All-Star Game ==
The AA hosted an annual All-Star Game from 2006 to 2010, intermittently, and then from 2022 onwards. The league's first All-Star game was played in El Paso, Texas, on July 18, 2006, which pitted a team of AA All-Stars against an All-Star team from the Can-Am League. Its current format pits the all-stars from each division against each other, except for the 2017 edition, which featured another tilt against the Can-Am League. There was no All-Star game held from 2011 to 2013, nor in 2015, 2018, 2020, or 2021.

=== Game results ===
Date	Score	Venue (city)	Attendance	MVP
July 18, 2006	AA 5, Can-Am 3	Cohen Stadium (El Paso, Texas)	10,102	Jake Whitesides, St. Joe Blacksnakes
July 17, 2007	South 6, North 4	Sioux Falls Stadium (Sioux Falls, South Dakota)	5,263	Jorge Alvarez, El Paso Diablos
July 22, 2008	South 11, North 4	Midway Stadium (St. Paul, Minnesota)	6,330	Bryan Fryer, Fort Worth Cats
July 21, 2009	North 6, South 2	QuikTrip Park (Grand Prairie, Texas)	5,504	Trevor Lawhorn, Sioux Falls Canaries
July 27, 2010	South 12, North 3	Lawrence–Dumont Stadium (Wichita, Kansas)	4,012	Chris Garcia, Shreveport-Bossier Captains
2011-13	No game scheduled			
July 29, 2014	South 7, North 0	Shaw Park (Winnipeg, Manitoba)	6,889	Devin Goodwin, Laredo Lemurs
2015	No game scheduled			
August 2, 2016	North 6, South 1	CHS Field (St. Paul, Minnesota)	8,015	David Rohm, Winnipeg Goldeyes
July 25, 2017	Can-Am 3, AA 2	RCGT Park (Ottawa, Ontario)	4,961	Danny Grauer, Ottawa Champions
2018	No game scheduled			
July 23, 2019	North 7, South 3	CHS Field (St. Paul, Minnesota)	7,565	Colin Willis, Gary SouthShore RailCats
2020-21	Game cancelled due to the COVID-19 pandemic			
July 12, 2022	West 7, East 6	Impact Field (Rosemont, Illinois)	4,143	Jabari Henry, Sioux Falls Canaries
July 18, 2023	East 4, West 2	Franklin Field (Franklin, Wisconsin)	2,255	Bryan Torres, Milwaukee Milkmen
July 23, 2024	West 4, East 3	Legends Field (Kansas City, Kansas)	—	Ismael Alcantara, Fargo-Moorhead RedHawks
July 22, 2025	East 9, West 2	Newman Outdoor Field (Fargo, North Dakota)	3,033	Aaron Altherr, Cleburne Railroaders
July 22, 2026	East 9, West 3	Haymarket Park (Lincoln, Nebraska)	3,570	Jaxx Groshans, Chicago Dogs

== Player of the Year ==
- 2006 – Pichi Balet (Lincoln Saltdogs)
- 2007 – Jorge Alvarez (El Paso Diablos)
- 2008 – Beau Torbert (Sioux Falls Canaries)
- 2009 – Greg Porter (Wichita Wingnuts)
- 2010 – Beau Torbert (Sioux Falls Canaries)
- 2011 – Lee Cruz (Amarillo Sox)
- 2012 – Nic Jackson (Fargo-Moorhead RedHawks)
- 2013 – C. J. Ziegler (Wichita Wingnuts)
- 2014 – Brent Clevlen (Wichita Wingnuts)
- 2015 – Vinny DiFazio (St. Paul Saints)
- 2016 – Nate Samson (Sioux City Explorers)
- 2017 – Josh Romanski (Winnipeg Goldeyes)
- 2018 – Jose Sermo (Sioux City Explorers)
- 2019 – Keon Barnum (Chicago Dogs)
- 2020 – Adam Brett Walker II (Milwaukee Milkmen)
- 2021 – Adam Brett Walker II (Milwaukee Milkmen)
- 2022 – Max Murphy (Winnipeg Goldeyes)
- 2023 – Chris Herrmann (Kansas City Monarchs)
- 2024 – Jacob Teter (Chicago Dogs)
- 2025 – Calvin Estrada (Sioux Falls Canaries)

== League attendance ==
Year	Total attendance	Average per game	Change from previous year avg
2006	1,296,936	2,819	n/a
2007	1,318,841	2,924	+105
2008	1,506,870	3,312	+388
2009	1,483,214	3,154	-158
2010	1,227,518	2,692	-462
2011	2,162,269	3,152	+460
2012	2,241,510	3,508	+356
2013	2,150,031	3,435	-73
2014	1,885,998	3,332	-103
2015	2,006,110	3,215	-117
2016	1,833,503	3,156	-59
2017	1,866,910	3,322	+166
2018	1,891,794	3,251	-71
2019	1,775,249	3,082	-169
2020	179,150**	1,066*	-2,016
2021	1,198,085	2,106*	+1,040
2022	1,510,341	2,591	+485
2023	1,549,917	2,668	+77
2024	1,610,478	2,791	+123
2025	1,584,525	2,723	-68

*Limited attendance due to COVID-19 pandemic **60 game schedule with 6 teams due to COVID-19 pandemic

=== Attendance records ===
- Season: 413,482, St. Paul, 2016
- Game: 13,406, El Paso, July 4, 2011

== See also ==
- Baseball awards – U.S. independent professional leagues
