= List of Chicago White Sox first-round draft picks =

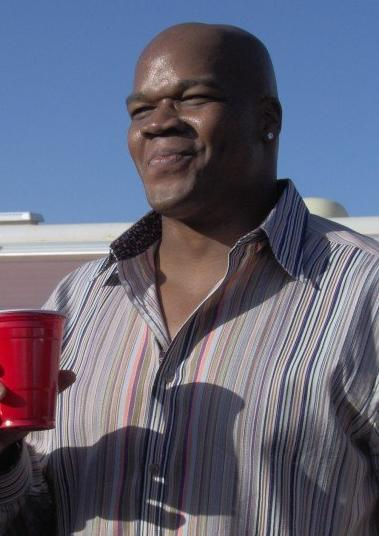
Frank Thomas (1989) was a two-time American League Most Valuable Player, and was a first-ballot Hall of Fame inductee in 2014.

The Chicago White Sox are a Major League Baseball (MLB) franchise based in Chicago, Illinois. They play in the American League Central division. Since the institution of MLB's Rule 4 Draft, the White Sox have selected 66 players in the first round. Officially known as the "First-Year Player Draft", the Rule 4 Draft is MLB's primary mechanism for assigning amateur baseball players from high schools, colleges, and other amateur baseball clubs to its teams. The draft order is determined based on the previous season's standings, with the team possessing the worst record receiving the first pick. In addition, teams which lost free agents in the previous off-season may be awarded compensatory or supplementary picks.

Of the 66 players picked in the first round by the Chicago White Sox, 32 have been pitchers, the most of any position; 20 of them were right-handed, while 12 were left-handed. Twelve outfielders, eight catchers, five shortstops, five third basemen, and four first basemen were also taken. The team has never drafted a player at second base. Fourteen of the players came from high schools or universities in the state of California, and Florida follows with eight players. The White Sox have also drafted six players from their home state of Illinois.

Two White Sox first-round picks are members of the Hall of Fame; Frank Thomas (1989) was elected to the Hall at his first opportunity in 2014.The other is Harold Baines. One player has won a championship with the team; Aaron Rowand (1998) was part of the 2005 World Series championship team. Thomas was a member of the White Sox for 16 years, including the 2005 season, but was not part of the World Series roster due to injury. Thomas is also the only first-round draft pick to win the Most Valuable Player Award, winning the American League honors in both 1993 and 1994. One pick, 1987 selection Jack McDowell, has won the Cy Young Award with the team; he won it in 1993. The White Sox had the first overall selection three times in the draft, which they used on Danny Goodwin (1971), Harold Baines (1977) and TBD (2026).

The White Sox have made 16 selections in the supplemental round of the draft and 5 compensatory picks since the institution of the First-Year Player Draft in 1965. These additional picks are provided when a team loses a particularly valuable free agent in the previous off-season,^{[V]} or, more recently, if a team fails to sign a draft pick from the previous year. The White Sox have failed to sign three of their first-round picks: Danny Goodwin (1971), Steve Buechele (1979), and Bobby Seay (1996). The White Sox did not receive any compensation for Goodwin or Buechele, but they did receive the 51st pick in 1997 for failing to sign Seay.

== Key ==
Year	Each year links to an article about that year's Major League Baseball draft.
Position	Indicates the secondary/collegiate position at which the player was drafted, rather than the professional position the player may have gone on to play
Pick	Indicates the number of the pick
*	Player did not sign with the White Sox
§	Indicates a supplemental pick
†	Member of the National Baseball Hall of Fame
'05	Player was a member of the White Sox' 2005 championship team

== Picks ==
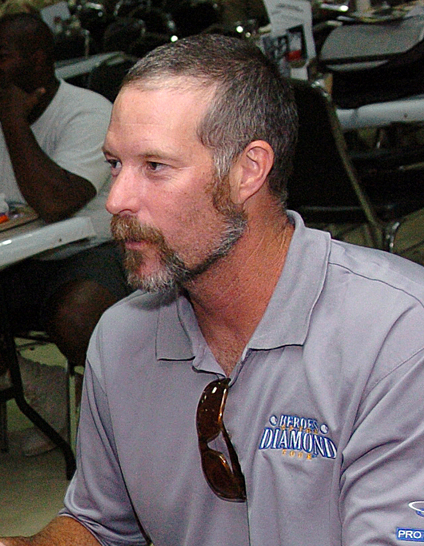
Jack McDowell (1987) won the Cy Young Award with the White Sox in 1993.

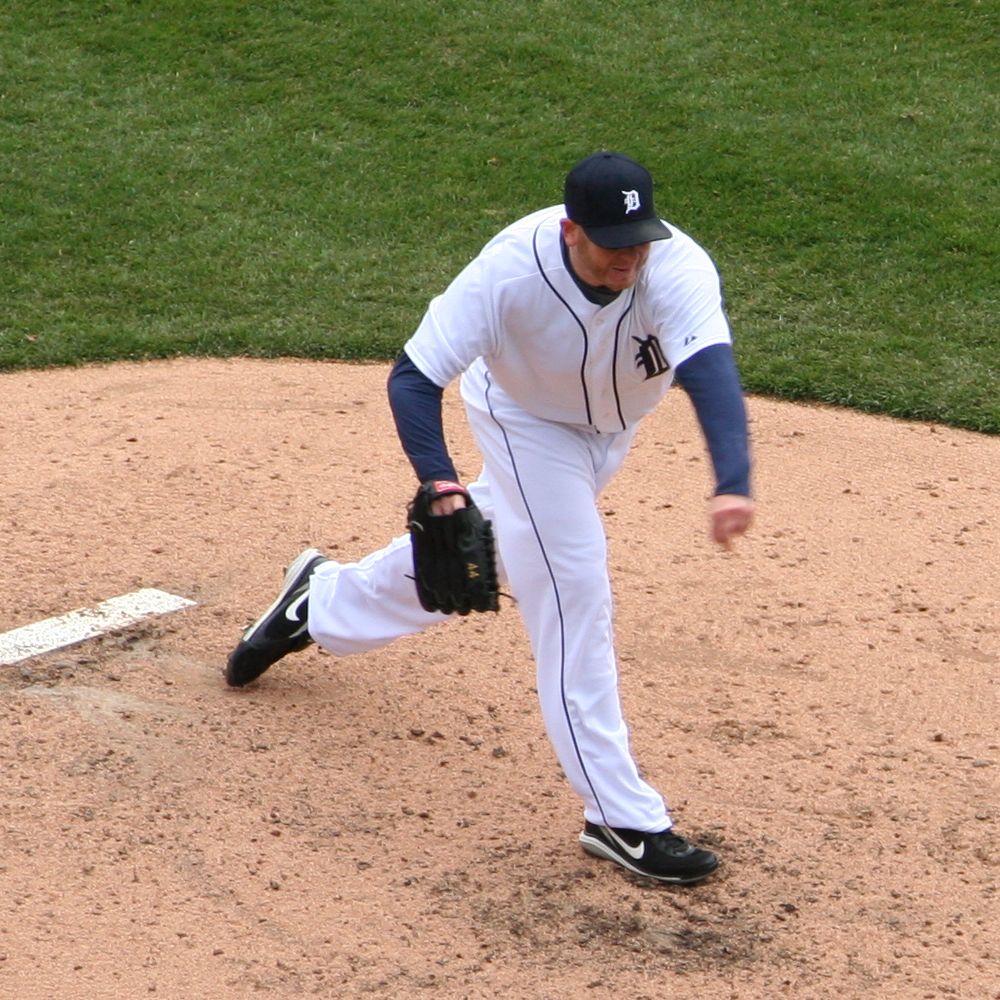
Bobby Seay (1996) was one of seven players drafted by the White Sox from the state of Florida.

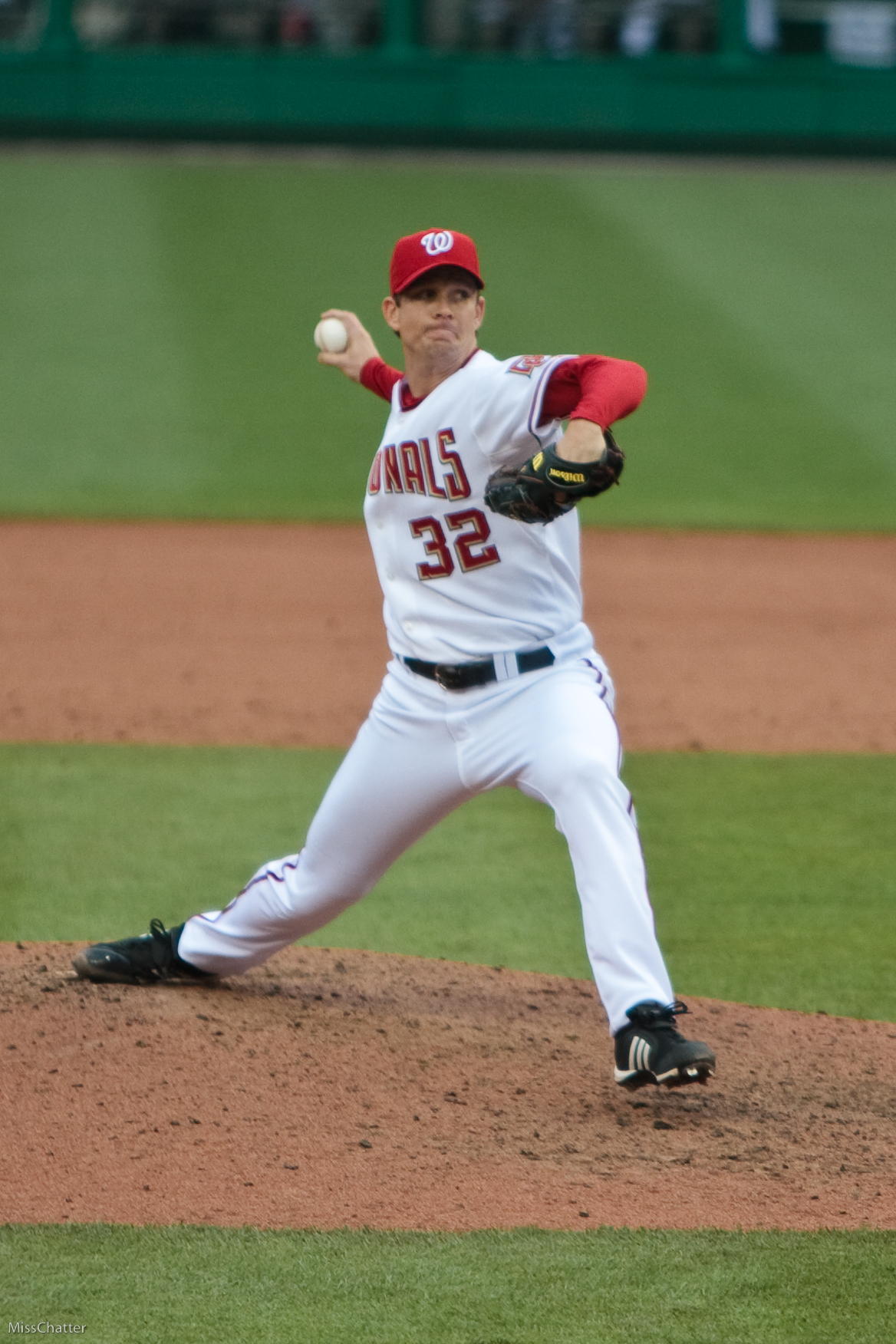
Kip Wells (1998) was one of two players drafted by the White Sox from Baylor University.

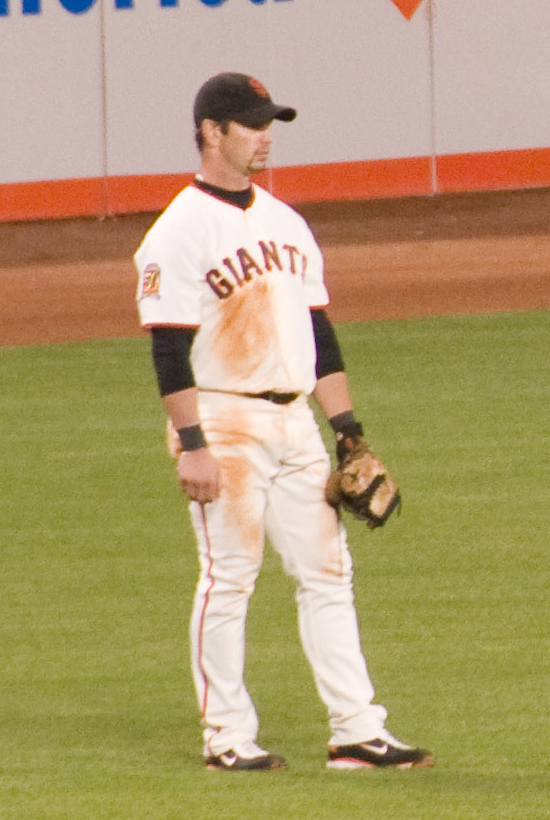
Aaron Rowand (1998) won a World Series title with the White Sox in 2005.

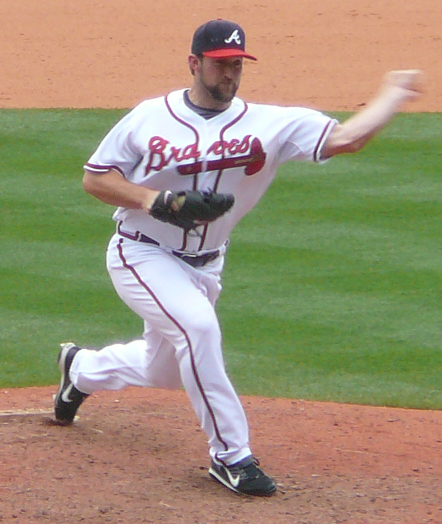
Royce Ring (2002) was one of 14 players drafted by the White Sox from the state of California.

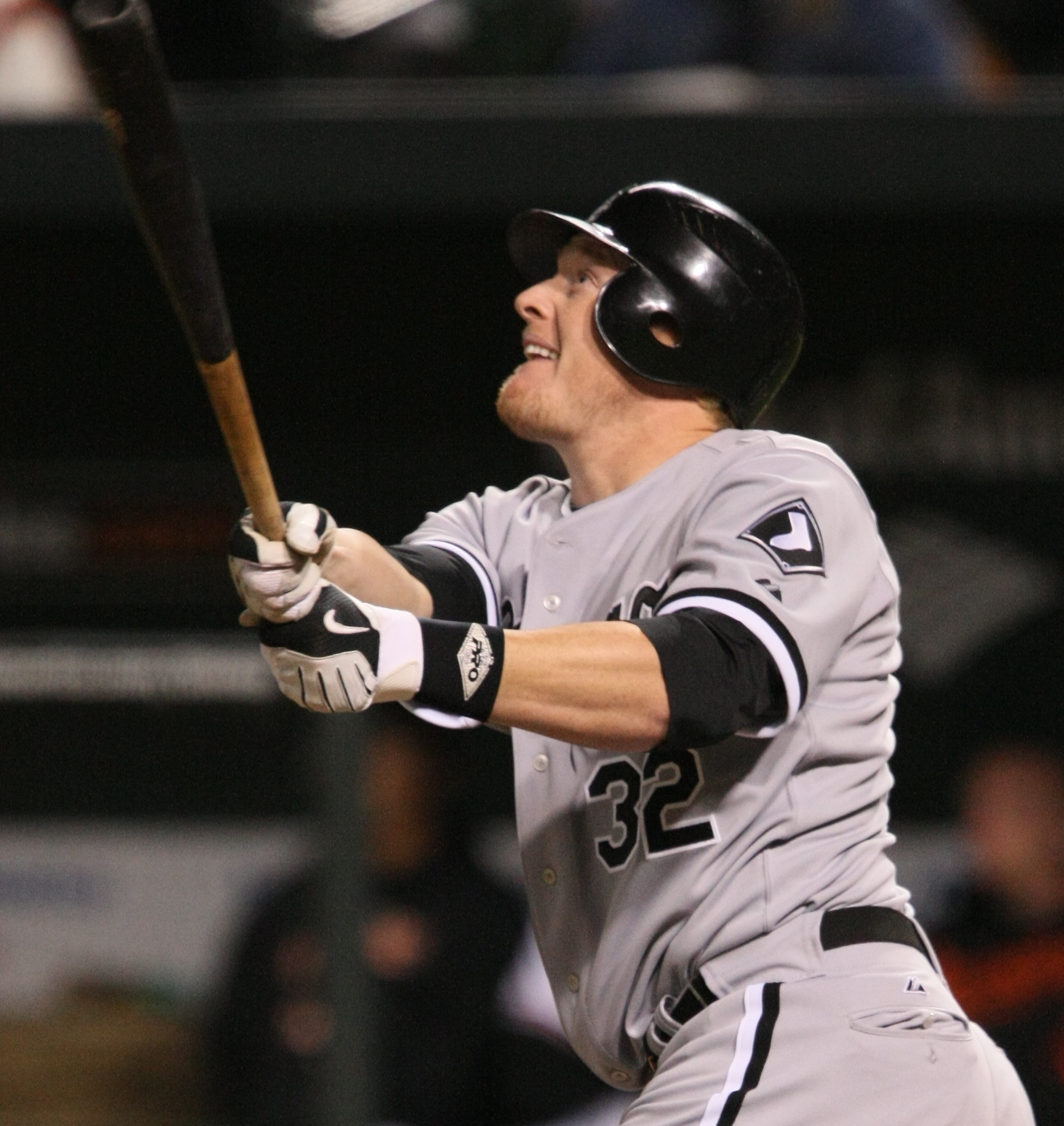
Brian Anderson (2003) was drafted as an outfielder by the White Sox, but later converted to a pitcher.

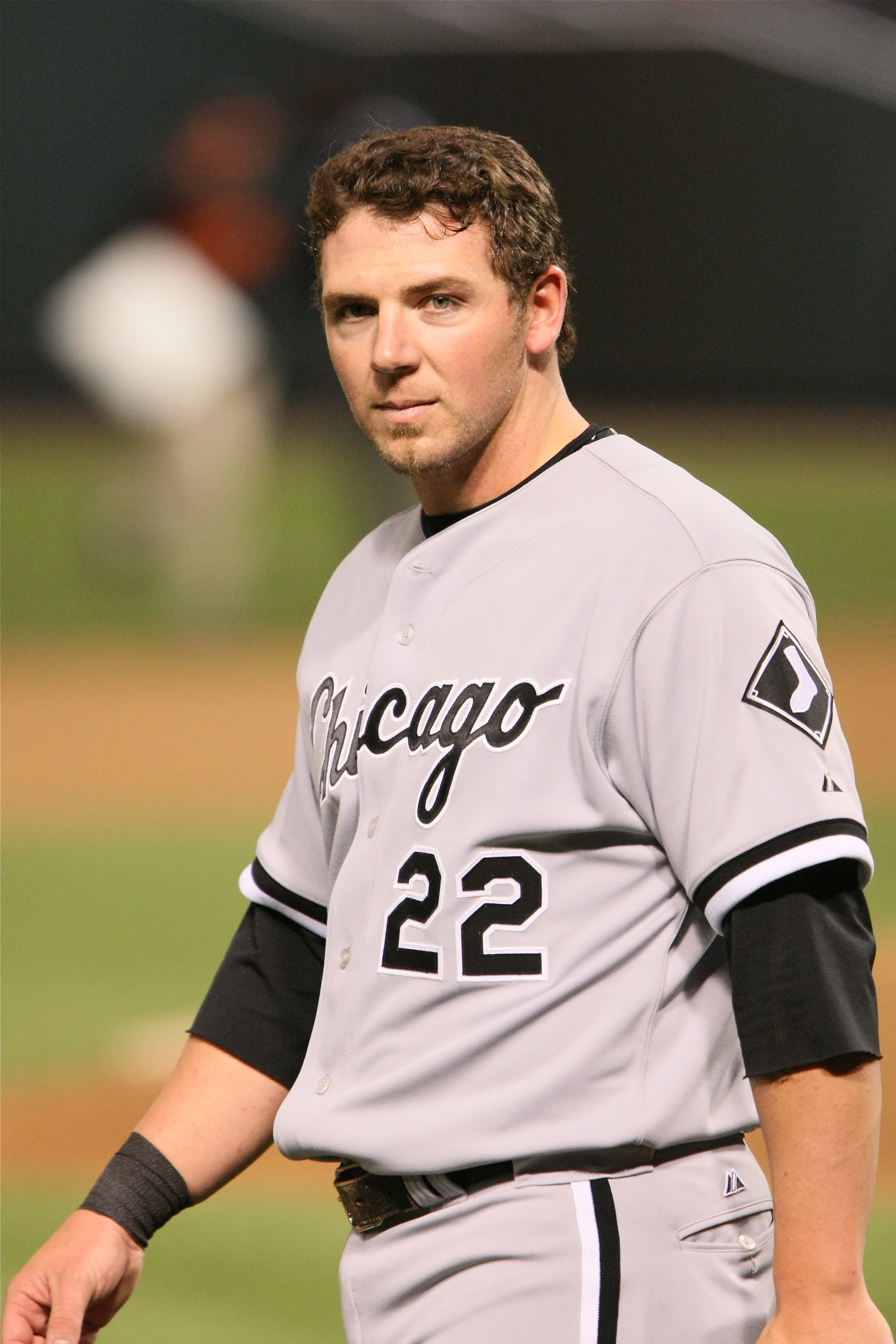
Josh Fields (2004) was one of two players drafted by the White Sox from Oklahoma State University.

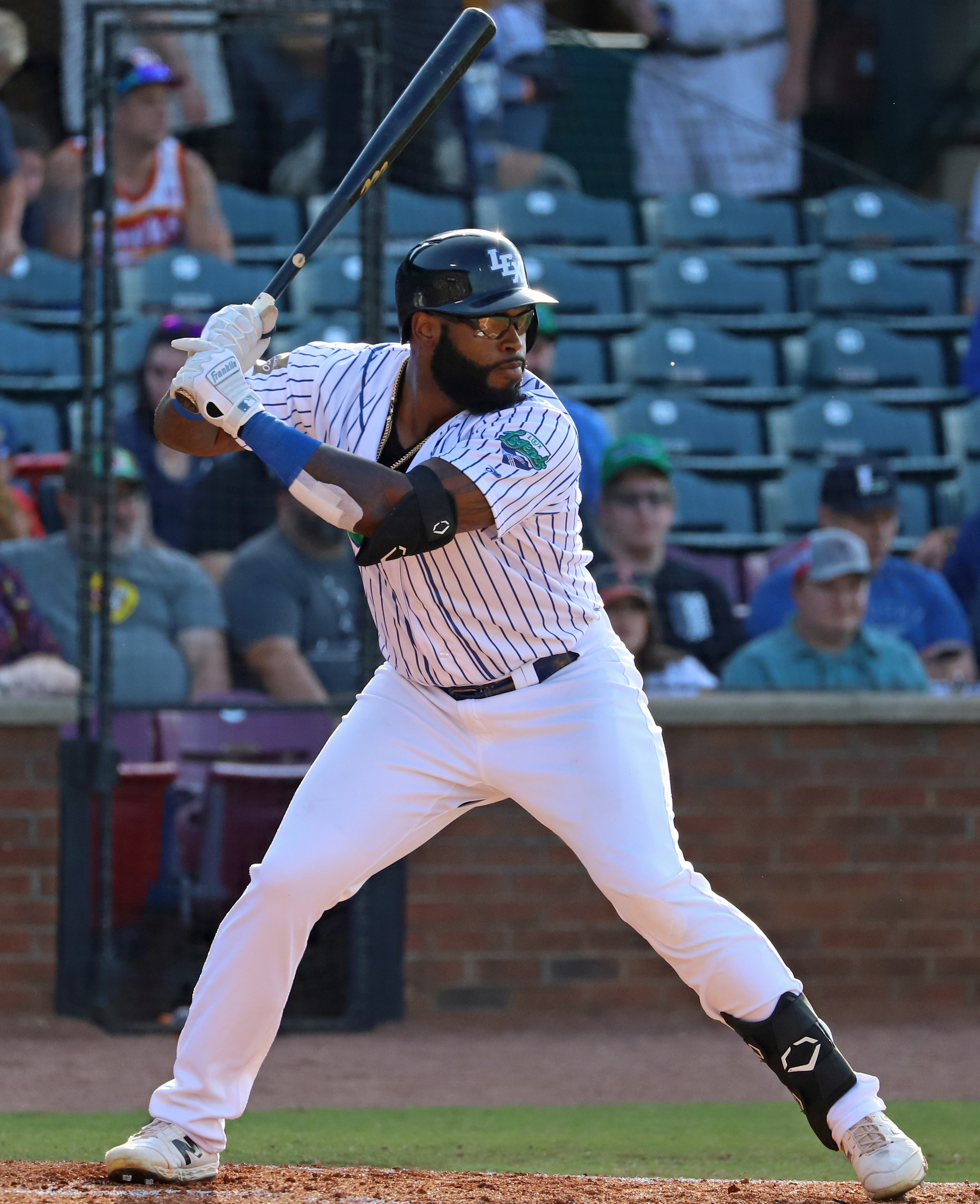
Courtney Hawkins (2012) was the first of two White Sox first-round draft picks in 2012 who did not reach the Major Leagues.

Year	Name	Position	School (location)	Pick	Ref
1965	Ken Plesha	Catcher	University of Notre Dame (Notre Dame, Indiana)	17	
1966	Carlos May	Outfielder	A. H. Parker High School (Birmingham, Alabama)	18	
1967	William Haynes	Third baseman	Headland High School (East Point, Georgia)	13	
1968	Rich McKinney	Shortstop	Ohio University (Athens, Ohio)	14	
1969	Ted Nicholson	Third baseman	Oak Park High School (Laurel, Mississippi)	3	
1970	Lee Richard	Shortstop	Southern University (Baton Rouge, Louisiana)	6	
1971	Danny Goodwin*	Catcher	Peoria Central High School (Peoria, Illinois)	1	
1972	Mike Ondina	Outfielder	Cordova High School (Rancho Cordova, California)	12	
1973	Steve Swisher	Catcher	Ohio University (Athens, Ohio)	21	
1974	Larry Monroe	Right-handed pitcher	Forest View High School (Arlington Heights, Illinois)	8	
1975	Chris Knapp	Right-handed pitcher	Central Michigan University (Mount Pleasant, Michigan)	11	
1976	Steve Trout	Left-handed pitcher	Thornwood High School (South Holland, Illinois)	8	
1977	Harold Baines^{†}	First baseman	St. Michael's High School (Easton, Maryland)	1	
1978	no first-round pick^{[a]}				
1979	Steve Buechele*	Shortstop	Servite High School (Anaheim, California)	9	
1979	Ricky Seilheimer	Catcher	Brenham High School (Brenham, Texas)	19^{§}^{[b]}	
1980	Cecil Espy	Outfielder	Point Loma High School (San Diego, California)	8	
1981	Daryl Boston	Left-handed pitcher	Woodward High School (Cincinnati, Ohio)	7	
1982	Ron Karkovice	Catcher	William R. Boone High School (Orlando, Florida)	14	
1983	Joel Davis	Right-handed pitcher	Sandalwood High School (Jacksonville, Florida)	13^{[c]}	
1983	Russ Morman	Outfielder	Wichita State University (Wichita, Kansas)	28^{§}^{[d]}	
1984	Tony Menendez	Right-handed pitcher	American High School (Miami, Florida)	20^{[e]}	
1984	Tom Hartley	Outfielder	Hudson's Bay High School (Vancouver, Washington)	26	
1985	Kurt Brown	Catcher	Glendora High School (Glendora, California)	5	
1986	Grady Hall	Left-handed pitcher	Northwestern University (Evanston, Illinois)	20	
1987	Jack McDowell	Right-handed pitcher	Stanford University (Stanford, California)	5	
1988	Robin Ventura	Third baseman	Oklahoma State University–Stillwater (Stillwater, Oklahoma)	10	
1989	Frank Thomas^{†}	First baseman	Auburn University (Auburn, Alabama)	7	
1990	Alex Fernandez	Right-handed pitcher	Miami Dade College (Miami, Florida)	4	
1991	Scott Ruffcorn	Right-handed pitcher	Baylor University (Waco, Texas)	25	
1992	Eddie Pearson	First baseman	Bishop State Community College (Mobile, Alabama)	24	
1993	Scott Christman	Left-handed pitcher	Oregon State University (Corvallis, Oregon)	17	
1994	Mark Johnson	Catcher	Warner Robins High School (Warner Robins, Georgia)	26	
1994	Chris Clemons	Right-handed pitcher	Texas A&M University (College Station, Texas)	33^{§}^{[f]}	
1995	Jeff Liefer	Third baseman	California State University, Long Beach (Long Beach, California)	25	
1996	Bobby Seay*	Left-handed pitcher	Sarasota High School (Sarasota, Florida)	12	
1997	Jason Dellaero	Shortstop	University of South Florida (Tampa, Florida)	15	
1997	Kyle Kane	Right-handed pitcher	Saddleback College (Mission Viejo, California)	33^{§}^{[g]}	
1997	Brett Caradonna	Outfielder	El Capitan High School (Lakeside, California)	34^{§}^{[h]}	
1997	Aaron Myette	Right-handed pitcher	Central Arizona College (Coolidge, Arizona)	43^{§}^{[i]}	
1997	Jim Parque	Left-handed pitcher	University of California, Los Angeles (Los Angeles, California)	46^{§}^{[j]}	
1997	Rocky Biddle	Right-handed pitcher	California State University, Long Beach (Long Beach, California)	51^{§}^{[k]}	
1998	Kip Wells	Right-handed pitcher	Baylor University (Waco, Texas)	16	
1998	Aaron Rowand '05	Outfielder	California State University, Fullerton (Fullerton, California)	35^{§}^{[l]}	
1999	Jason Stumm	Right-handed pitcher	Centralia High School (Centralia, Washington)	15	
1999	Matt Ginter	Right-handed pitcher	Mississippi State University (Mississippi State, Mississippi)	22^{§}^{[m]}	
1999	Brian West	Right-handed pitcher	West Monroe High School (West Monroe, Louisiana)	35^{§}^{[n]}	
1999	Rob Purvis	Right-handed pitcher	Bradley University (Peoria, Illinois)	45^{§}^{[o]}	
2000	Joe Borchard	Outfielder	Stanford University (Stanford, California)	12	
2001	Kris Honel	Right-handed pitcher	Providence Catholic High School (New Lenox, Illinois)	16^{[p]}	
2001	Wyatt Allen	Right-handed pitcher	University of Tennessee (Knoxville, Tennessee)	39^{§}^{[q]}	
2002	Royce Ring	Left-handed pitcher	San Diego State University (San Diego, California)	18	
2003	Brian Anderson	Outfielder	University of Arizona (Tucson, Arizona)	15	
2004	Josh Fields	Third baseman	Oklahoma State University–Stillwater (Stillwater, Oklahoma)	18	
2004	Tyler Lumsden	Left-handed pitcher	Clemson University (Clemson, South Carolina)	34^{§}^{[r]}	
2004	Gio Gonzalez	Left-handed pitcher	Monsignor Edward Pace High School (Opa-locka, Florida)	38^{§}^{[s]}	
2005	Lance Broadway	Right-handed pitcher	Texas Christian University (Fort Worth, Texas)	15	
2006	Kyle McCulloch	Right-handed pitcher	University of Texas at Austin (Austin, Texas)	29	
2007	Aaron Poreda	Left-handed pitcher	University of San Francisco (San Francisco, California)	25	
2008	Gordon Beckham	Shortstop	University of Georgia (Athens, Georgia)	8	
2009	Jared Mitchell	Outfielder	Louisiana State University (Baton Rouge, Louisiana)	23	
2009	Josh Phegley	Catcher	Indiana University Bloomington (Bloomington, Indiana)	38^{§}^{[t]}	
2010	Chris Sale	Left-handed pitcher	Florida Gulf Coast University (Fort Myers, Florida)	13	
2011	Keenyn Walker	Outfielder	Central Arizona College (Coolidge, Arizona)	47^{§}^{[u]}	
2012	Courtney Hawkins	Outfielder	Mary Carroll High School (Corpus Christi, Texas)	13	
2012	Keon Barnum	First baseman	King High School (Tampa, Florida)	48^{§}^{[v]}	
2013	Tim Anderson	Shortstop	East Central Community College (Decatur, Mississippi)	17	
2014	Carlos Rodon	Left-handed pitcher	North Carolina State University (Raleigh, North Carolina)	3	
2015	Carson Fulmer	Right-handed pitcher	Vanderbilt University (Nashville, Tennessee)	8	
2016	Zack Collins	Catcher	University of Miami (Coral Gables, Florida)	10	
2016	Zack Burdi	Pitcher	University of Louisville (Louisville, Kentucky)	26^{§}^{[w]}	
2017	Jake Burger	Third baseman	Missouri State University (Springfield, Missouri)	11	
2018	Nick Madrigal	Shortstop	Oregon State University (Corvallis, Oregon)	4	
2019	Andrew Vaughn	First baseman	University of California (Berkeley, California)	3	
2020	Garrett Crochet	Left-handed pitcher	University of Tennessee (Knoxville, Tennessee)	11	
2021	Colson Montgomery	Shortstop	Southridge High School (Huntingburg, Indiana)	22	
2022	Noah Schultz	Left-handed pitcher	Oswego East High School (Oswego, Illinois)	26	
2023	Jacob Gonzalez	Shortstop	Ole Miss University (Oxford, Mississippi)	15	
2024	Hagen Smith	Left-handed pitcher	University of Arkansas (Fayetteville, Arkansas)	5	
2025	Billy Carlson	Shortstop	Corona High School (Corona, California)	10	
2026	Roch Cholowsky	Shortstop	UCLA (Los Angeles, California)	1	
2026	Landon Thome	Shortstop	Nazareth Academy (La Grange Park, Illinois)	34^{§}	

== See also ==
- Chicago White Sox minor league players

== Footnotes ==
- ^{V} Through the 2012 draft, free agents were evaluated by the Elias Sports Bureau and rated "Type A", "Type B", or not compensation-eligible. If a team offered arbitration to a player but that player refused and subsequently signed with another team, the original team was able to receive additional draft picks. If a "Type A" free agent left in this way, his previous team received a supplemental pick and a compensatory pick from the team with which he signed. If a "Type B" free agent left in this way, his previous team received only a supplemental pick. Since the 2013 draft, free agents are no longer classified by type; instead, compensatory picks are only awarded if the team offered its free agent a contract worth at least the average of the 125 current richest MLB contracts. However, if the free agent's last team acquired the player in a trade during the last year of his contract, it is ineligible to receive compensatory picks for that player.
- ^{a} The White Sox lost their first-round pick in 1978 to the New York Yankees as compensation for signing free agent Ron Blomberg.
- ^{b} The White Sox gained a compensatory first-round pick in 1979 from the Baltimore Orioles for losing free agent Steve Stone.
- ^{c} The White Sox gained a compensatory first-round pick in 1983 from the New York Yankees for losing free agent Steve Kemp.
- ^{d} The White Sox gained a supplemental first-round pick in 1983 for losing free agent Steve Kemp.
- ^{e} The White Sox gained a compensatory first-round pick in 1984 from the Toronto Blue Jays for losing free agent Dennis Lamp.
- ^{f} The White Sox gained a supplemental first-round pick in 1994 for losing free agent Ellis Burks.
- ^{g} The White Sox gained a supplemental first-round pick in 1997 for losing free agent Alex Fernandez.
- ^{h} The White Sox gained a supplemental first-round pick in 1997 for losing free agent Kevin Tapani.
- ^{i} The White Sox gained a supplemental first-round pick in 1997 for losing free agent Alex Fernandez.
- ^{j} The White Sox gained a supplemental first-round pick in 1997 for losing free agent Alex Fernandez.
- ^{k} The White Sox gained a supplemental first-round pick in 1997 for failing to sign draft pick Bobby Seay.
- ^{l} The White Sox gained a supplemental first-round pick in 1998 for losing free agent Dave Martinez.
- ^{m} The White Sox gained a compensatory first-round pick in 1999 from the New York Mets for losing free agent Robin Ventura.
- ^{n} The White Sox gained a supplemental first-round pick in 1999 for losing free agent Albert Belle.
- ^{o} The White Sox gained a supplemental first-round pick in 1999 for losing free agent Robin Ventura.
- ^{p} The White Sox gained a compensatory first-round pick in 2001 from the Florida Marlins for losing free agent Charles Johnson.
- ^{q} The White Sox gained a supplemental first-round pick in 2001 for losing free agent Charles Johnson.
- ^{r} The White Sox gained a supplemental first-round pick in 2004 for losing free agent Bartolo Colón.
- ^{s} The White Sox gained a supplemental first-round pick in 2004 for losing free agent Tom Gordon.
- ^{t} The White Sox gained a supplemental first-round pick in 2009 for losing free agent Orlando Cabrera.
- ^{u} The White Sox gained a supplemental first-round pick in 2011 for losing free agent J. J. Putz.
- ^{v} The White Sox gained a supplemental first-round pick in 2012 for losing free agent Mark Buehrle.
