= Winnipeg Goldeyes =

Canadian baseball team

- Cap insignia

Information
- League: American Association of Professional Baseball (2011–present) (West Division)
- Location: Winnipeg, Manitoba
- Ballpark: Blue Cross Park (1999–2019, 2021–present)
- Founded: 1994
- Nickname: The Fish
- League championships: 4 (1994, 2012, 2016, 2017)
- Division championships: 11 (1994, 1997, 1998, 1999, 2001, 2002, 2003, 2011, 2014, 2017, 2024)
- Former league: Northern League (1994–2010)
- Former ballpark(s): Winnipeg Stadium (1994–1998) Newman Outdoor Field (2020) The Ballpark at Jackson (2021)
- Colours: Heritage red, keel grey, bright white, river red, dorsal grey, golden eye, golden eye dark
- Retired numbers: 5, 6, 11, 21, 22 and 31
- Ownership: Sam Katz
- General manager: Andrew Collier
- Manager: Logan Watkins
- Media: CJNU 93.7 FM; Envol 91 FM; Winnipeg Sun; Winnipeg Free Press
- Website: goldeyes.com

The Winnipeg Goldeyes are a professional minor-league baseball team based in Winnipeg, Manitoba, Canada. The Goldeyes play in the American Association of Professional Baseball, which they joined in 2011. Previously, the Goldeyes were members of the Northern League from 1994 until 2010. The Goldeyes were champions of the Northern League in 1994. They are also three-time champions of the American Association; having won in 2012, and back-to-back in 2016 and 2017. The team is named after the goldeye, a fish usually served as a smoked delicacy and commonly called Winnipeg goldeye.

== History ==
There have been two separate and distinct baseball teams based out of Winnipeg to use the Goldeyes name, each playing in different incarnations of the Northern League. They first played in the original Northern League from 1954 until 1964. During that time, the Goldeyes were a minor league affiliate of the St. Louis Cardinals and they won the league championship three times (1957, 1959, and 1960). The Goldeyes returned to the Short Season-A Northern League for one season, 1969, as an affiliate of the expansion Kansas City Royals, but they did not return in 1970, and the entire league shut down after the 1971 season.

The Goldeyes name was resurrected in 1994 when the independent league Rochester Aces of the new Northern League relocated to Winnipeg. It was decided the team would take on the name of the former Winnipeg team in honor of the past. In their inaugural season in Winnipeg, the new Goldeyes captured the Northern League championship.

The Goldeyes became the longest tenured franchise in the Northern League following the departure of the St. Paul Saints, Sioux City Explorers, and Sioux Falls Canaries to the breakaway American Association in 2005; however, the team would jump to the American Association after the 2010 season. The Goldeyes captured their first American Association championship in 2012, sweeping the Wichita Wingnuts in the finals.

The Goldeyes fueled their rivalry with Wichita in 2016, when they defeated the Wingnuts in game five in Wichita for their second American Association championship. Next season, the teams would meet again; this matchup looked as if the Wingnuts won the series in game four after a ground-out won the game and the team began celebrating on the mound. However, the umpire had called a balk and the strike was re-thrown; the Goldeyes tied the game later in the at-bat and forced a marathon 17-inning game. This was the longest game in American Association history, which they won to play a game five. The Goldeyes would seal back-to-back championships with an 18–2 victory over Wichita at home in Winnipeg.

In 2020, the league announced that the Goldeyes would compete as one of six teams in a condensed 60-game season as a result of the COVID-19 pandemic. However, they would not play games at Shaw Park, and were instead based at Newman Outdoor Field (thus sharing a home field with the Fargo Moorhead RedHawks). Due to continued border restrictions, the Goldeyes announced plans to initially play home games during the 2021 season out of The Ballpark at Jackson in Jackson, Tennessee, the former home of the Jackson Generals. However, Jackson Mayor Scott Conger notified the teams that the Generals lost their authority to manage the city-owned ballpark when they lost their affiliation with Minor League Baseball and that they were issued an eviction notice to leave the stadium after May 30, nine days after the Goldeyes' May 21 home opener. On June 1, the Goldeyes entered into a new license agreement with the city to continue use of the facility. On July 22, the Goldeyes were granted permission from the federal and provincial governments to return to Shaw Park for games beginning on August 3.

=== Stadium ===
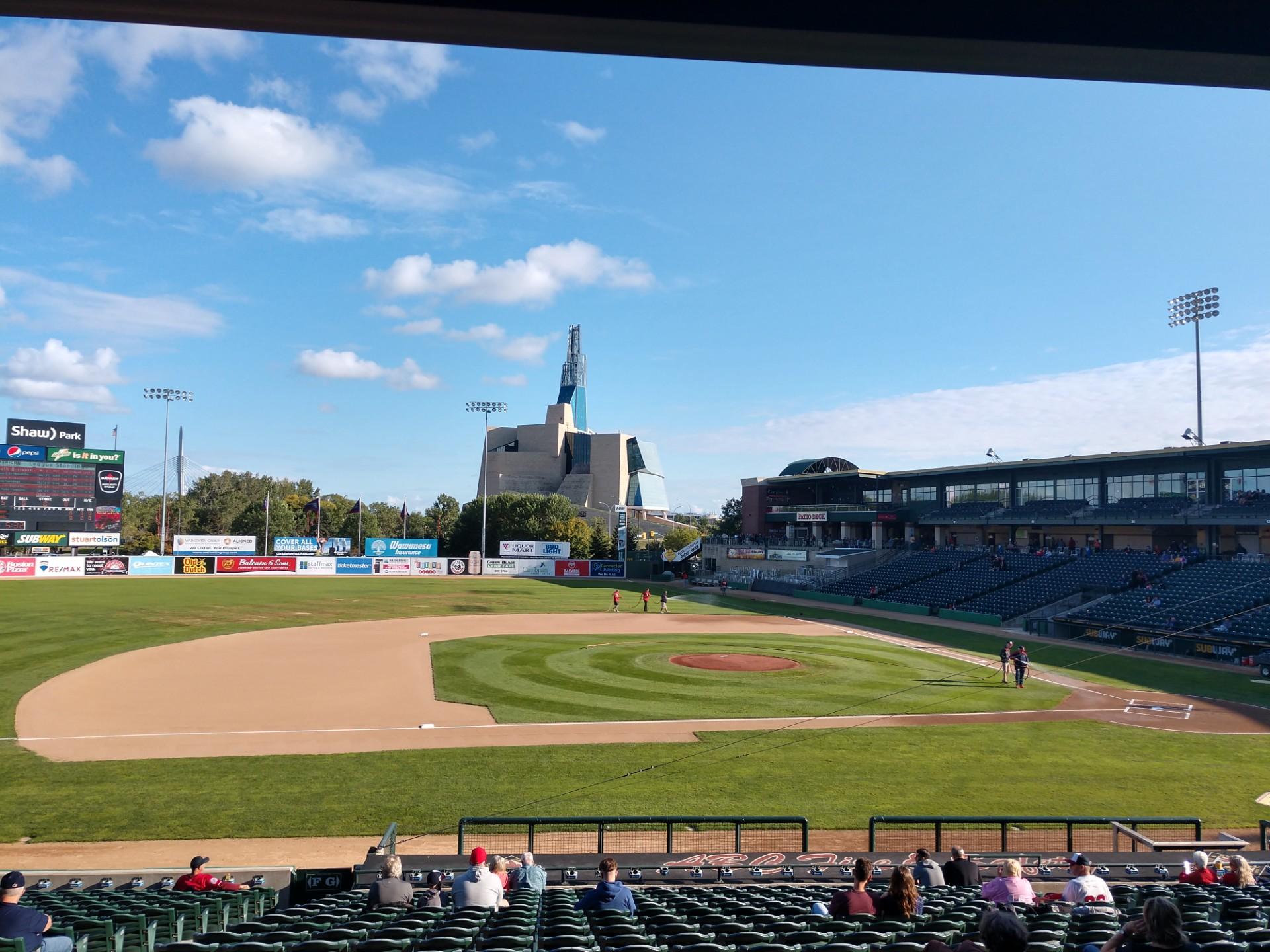
Inside Blue Cross Park before a Winnipeg Goldeyes home game

From 1994 to 1998, the Goldeyes played their homes games at Winnipeg Stadium, a Canadian football stadium retrofitted for baseball. The team moved into CanWest Global Park (now Blue Cross Park), their own baseball-only facility, prior to the 1999 season. Due to the COVID-19 pandemic, the Goldeyes played its 2020 season home games at Newman Outdoor Field, and April–July home games in the 2021 season at The Ballpark at Jackson.

== Season-by-season records ==
			First Half		Second Half		Overall		
Season	League	Division	W–L	Finish	W–L	Finish	W–L	Win%	Playoffs
1994	NL	N/A	16–24	5th	27–13	1st	43–37	.538	Won championship
1995	NL	N/A	25–17	2nd	22–21	3rd	47–38	.553	Lost championship series
1996	NL	West	25–17	2nd	25–17	2nd	50–34	.595	Lost divisional series
1997	NL	West	29–12	1st	24–18	2nd	53–30	.639	Lost championship series
1998	NL	West	25–18	2nd	33–10	1st	58–28	.674	Lost division series
1999	NL	West	28–15	1st	20–23	3rd	48–38	558	Lost championship series
2000	NL	West	24–19	3rd	24–19	2nd	48–38	.558	Lost Central semi-final
2001	NL	North	29–16	1st	23–22	1st	52–38	.578	Lost championship series
2002	NL	North	28–17	1st	28–17	1st	56–34	.622	Lost championship series
2003	NL	East	26–18	2nd	29–16	1st	55–34	.618	Lost championship series
2004	NL	North	26–21	3rd	30–18	2nd	56–39	.589	Did not qualify
2005	NL	North	22–25	4th	25–23	4th	47–48	.495	Did not qualify
2006	NL	North	27–21	2nd	25–23	2nd	52–44	.542	Lost West final
2007	NL	North	27–20	2nd	25–23	2nd	52–43	.547	Lost Division Finals
2008	NL	N/A	51–45	3rd	N/A	N/A	51–45	.531	Lost semi-final
2009	NL	N/A	55–41	2nd	N/A	N/A	55–41	.573	Lost semi-final
2010	NL	N/A	46–53	6th	N/A	N/A	46–53	.465	Did not qualify
2011	AA	North	60–40	1st	N/A	N/A	60–40	.600	Lost Division Finals
2012	AA	North	55–45	2nd	N/A	N/A	55–45	.550	Won championship
2013	AA	North	56–44	2nd	N/A	N/A	56–44	.560	Did not qualify
2014	AA	North	63–37	1st	N/A	N/A	63–37	.630	Lost division series
2015	AA	North	47–52	2nd	N/A	N/A	47–52	.475	Did not qualify
2016	AA	North	58–42	2nd	N/A	N/A	58–42	.580	Won championship
2017	AA	North	62–38	1st	N/A	N/A	62–38	.620	Won championship
2018	AA	North	41–59	5th	N/A	N/A	41–59	.410	Did not qualify
2019	AA	North	57–43	4th	N/A	N/A	57–43	.570	Did not qualify
2020	AA	N/A	29–31	4th	N/A	N/A	29–31	.483	Did not qualify
2021	AA	North	50–49	4th	N/A	N/A	50–49	.505	Did not qualify
2022	AA	West	53–47	3rd	N/A	N/A	53–47	.530	Lost division series
2023	AA	West	43–57	6th	N/A	N/A	43–57	.430	Did not qualify
2024	AA	West	56–43	1st	N/A	N/A	56–43	.566	Lost championship series
2025	AA	West	41–58	6th	N/A	N/A	41–58	.414	Did not qualify

== Playoffs ==
- 1994 season: Defeated Sioux City 3–1 to win championship
- 1995 season: Lost to St. Paul 3–1 in championship
- 1996 season: Lost to Fargo-Moorhead 2–1 in semifinals
- 1997 season: Defeated Fargo-Moorhead 3–2 in semifinals; lost to Duluth-Superior 3–2 in championship
- 1998 season: Lost to Fargo-Moorhead 3–1 in semifinals
- 1999 season: Defeated Sioux City 3–0 in quarterfinals; defeated Fargo-Moorhead 3–0 in semifinals; lost to Albany-Colonie 3–1 in championship
- 2000 season: Lost to Fargo-Moorhead 3–0 in quarterfinals
- 2001 season: Defeated Fargo-Moorhead 3–2 in quarterfinals; defeated Lincoln 3–1 in semifinals; lost to New Jersey 3–1 in championship
- 2002 season: Defeated Lincoln 3–2 in quarterfinals; defeated Sioux City 3–1 in semifinals; lost to New Jersey 3–1 in championship
- 2003 season: Defeated St. Paul 3–2 in semifinals; lost to Fargo-Moorhead 3–1 in championship
- 2006 season: Lost to Fargo-Moorhead 3–2 in semifinals
- 2007 season: Lost to Gary SouthShore 3–2 in semifinals
- 2008 season: Lost to Gary SouthShore 3–1 in semifinals
- 2009 season: Lost to Fargo-Moorhead 3–2 in semifinals
- 2011 season: Lost to St. Paul 3–2 in semifinals
- 2012 season: Defeated Fargo-Moorhead 3–0 in semifinals; defeated Wichita 3–0 to win championship
- 2014 season: Lost to Lincoln 3–2 in semifinals
- 2016 season: Defeated St. Paul 3–2 in semifinals; defeated Wichita 3–2 to win championship
- 2017 season: Defeated Lincoln 3–1 in semifinals; defeated Wichita 3–2 to win championship
- 2022 season: Lost to Fargo-Moorhead 2–1 in division series
- 2024 season: Defeated Sioux Falls 2–1 in division series; defeated Fargo-Moorhead 2–1 in division championship, lost to Kane County in championship

== Roster ==
Winnipeg Goldeyes roster
Active roster	Coaching staff
Pitchers: 16 James Colyer; 20 Arij Fransen; 24 Kevin Vaupel; 26 Quinn Waterhouse; 27 Ryo Kohigashi; 28 Willian Suárez; 29 Noah Millikan; 32 Landen Bourassa; 34 Weston Lombard; 36 Eli Saul; 37 Luke Boyd; 39 Tasker Strobel; 40 Mitchell Lambson; 47 James Bradwell; 48 Derrick Cherry; Catchers: 30 Kevin Garcia; 45 Raphaël Pelletier; Infielders: 3 Ramón Bramasco; 10 Ray-Patrick Didder; 15 Keshawn Lynch; 23 T.J. Schofield-Sam; Outfielders: 8 Adam Hall; 9 Jiandido Tromp; 13 Max Murphy; 17 Roby Enriquez; 25 Noah Marcelo	Manager: 14 Logan Watkins; Coaches: 41 Mark Brewer (pitching); 38 Adam Donachie (hitting); Cristian Molina (strength and conditioning coach); 35 Danny Perron (bullpen); Jamie Samson (clubhouse manager); Disabled list; ‡ Inactive list; § Suspended list; Roster updated May 10th, 2026 Transactions

== Retired numbers ==
- 5, Brian Duva (July 20, 2001)
- 6, Max Poulin (June 14, 2011)
- 11, Reggie Abercrombie (August 11, 2023)
- 21, Donnie Smith (July 21, 2009)
- 22, Hal Lanier (June 12, 2018)
- 31, Andrew "Ace" Walker (June 21, 2015)

== Notable alumni ==
- Dann Bilardello (1994)
- Pete Coachman (1994)
- Warren Sawkiw (1994)
- Darryl Brinkley (1994, 2004)
- Rich Thompson (1994)
- Jim Wilson (1994)
- Jeff Bittiger (1994–1995)
- Mike Cather (1995)
- Steve Springer (1995)
- Terry Lee (1995–1997)
- Brad Komminsk (1996)
- Steve Pegues (1997)
- Jeff Zimmerman (1997)
- Rod Pedraza (1997)
- Jeff Sparks (1997–1998)
- Scott Lydy (1998)
- Wes Chamberlain (1998, 2000, 2004)
- Dwayne Hosey (1999)
- Brian Myrow (1999–2001, 2011)
- Warren Newson (2000)
- Erik Plantenberg (2000)
- Luis Ortiz (2001)
- Luis Raven (2002)
- Bobby Madritsch (2002)
- Pete Rose Jr. (2002)
- Ira Smith (2002)
- George Sherrill (2002–2003)
- Jalal Leach (2003)
- Amaury García (2004)
- Wilfredo Rodríguez (2004)
- Michitaka Nishiyama (2004)
- Andy Stewart (2004)
- David Manning (2005)
- P.J. Connelly (2005)
- Chad Meyers (2005)
- Shawn Sedlacek (2005)
- Reggie Harris (2006)
- Julius Matos (2006)
- Jimmy Hurst (2006–2007)
- Fehlandt Lentini (2006–2008, 2011, 2013)
- Chris Latham (2007)
- Walter Young (2007)
- Mike Kusiewicz (2007)
- Greg Bicknell (2007)
- Brandon Kintzler (2007–2008)
- Iván Blanco (2008)
- Bill Pulsipher (2009)
- Juan Díaz (2009–2010)
- Ian Thomas (2009–2011)
- Bobby Korecky (2010)
- Donzell McDonald (2010)
- Jamie Vermilyea (2011)
- Jon Weber (2011–2012)
- Bárbaro Cañizares (2012)
- Chris Roberson (2012)
- Yurendell DeCaster (2012–2013)
- Mark Hardy (2013)
- Tyler Graham (2013)
- Tim Smith (2013–2014)
- Chris Kissock (2013–2014)
- Ray Sadler (2013–2014)
- Ryan Bollinger (2014)
- Brock Bond (2014)
- Reggie Abercrombie (2014–2019)
- Mike Wilson (2015)
- Jailen Peguero (2015–2016)
- Winston Abreu (2016)
- Kyle Lotzkar (2016)
- Eric Sim (2016)
- Josh Romanski (2016–2019)
- Evan Rutckyj (2017)
- Shane Dawson (2018)
- Tyler Herron (2018)
- Tommy Mendonca (2018)
- Reynaldo Rodríguez (2018)
- Dave Sappelt (2018)
- J. C. Sulbaran (2018)
- Brennan Bernardino (2018)
- Willy García (2019)
- Kyle Martin (2019–2021)
- Darnell Sweeney (2020)
- Eric Wood (2020)
- Brandon Cumpton (2020)
- Josh Lucas (2020, 2022)
- Bud Norris (2021)
- Donnie Hart (2021)
- David Washington (2022)
- Michael Crouse (2022)
- Tristan Pompey (2022)
- Brandon Marklund (2023)
- Marshall Kasowski (2024)
- Zac Reininger (2024)

== Mascots ==
Goldie, the Goldeyes' longest-serving mascot since 1994, is a locally beloved figure. In 2011, Goldette was added to the mascot roster. Goldette excels in dance and entertainment, and both Goldie and Goldette actively engage with fans and represent the team at events. Goldie also performs community outreach and supports the Winnipeg Goldeyes Field of Dreams Foundation, reflecting the organization's commitment to giving back to the community.

== See also ==
- List of baseball teams in Canada

== Sources ==
- Goldeyes official website
- nlfan.com – yearly league standings and awards
