= Milwaukee Milkmen =

American independent baseball team

Logo	Cap insignia

Information
- League: American Association of Professional Baseball (East Division)
- Location: Franklin, Wisconsin
- Ballpark: Franklin Field
- Founded: 2018
- League championships: 1: 2020
- Division championships: 3: 2020; 2022; 2026
- Colors: Black, white
- Ownership: Mike Zimmerman
- Manager: Anthony Barone
- Website: milwaukeemilkmen.com

Current uniforms
Darks	Pinstripes

The Milwaukee Milkmen are an independent baseball team based in Franklin, Wisconsin. They are members of the American Association of Professional Baseball, an official Partner League of Major League Baseball. They began play in 2019 and play home games at Franklin Field (formerly known as Routine Field).

== History ==
=== Inception 2018 ===
The Milwaukee Milkmen were announced in February 2018, as an expansion team in the American Association of professional baseball, scheduled to begin play for the 2019 season. The team was originally announced as the thirteenth team in the league, but upon the conclusion of the 2018 season the Wichita Wingnuts suspended operations after they lost their stadium to make way for a new stadium for the MiLB AA Witchita Wind Surge. The Milkmen nickname was chosen to reflect Wisconsin's reputation as "America's Dairyland." Milkmen was among ten finalists in a "Name the Team" contest which also included Barn Owls, Bovines, Broilers, Cheesers, Cow Tippers, Crop Dusters, Farmhands, Haymakers, and War Pigs.

==== First season ====
May 16, 2019, the Milwaukee Milkmen began their first season. Their first game was a 13-inning affair against the St. Paul Saints. The game included a delay due to a power failure at CHS Field. In the end, the Milkmen walked away from game with their first win, 5-4.

Due to construction delays on their new stadium Routine Field, the Milwaukee Milkmen played their first 13 home games at Kokomo Municipal Stadium in Indiana. Kokomo is the home to the Kokomo Jackrabbits of the Northwoods league, and are owned by the parent company of Milwaukee Milkmen. The Milkmen also hired the former Jackrabbits Manager Gary McClure to be their first manager. The Milkmen's Kokomo opener was May 24, where the fell to the Chicago Dogs 5-4.

The Milkmen opened Routine field on June 24 against the Gary SouthShore RailCats. The Milkmen lost the game, 3-2 in 11 innings. The team finished their first season with a record of 38–62. Routine field was renamed after the 2019 season to Franklin Field after a naming rights dispute. (See Franklin Field (Wisconsin) § Naming rights dispute.)

=== First championship ===
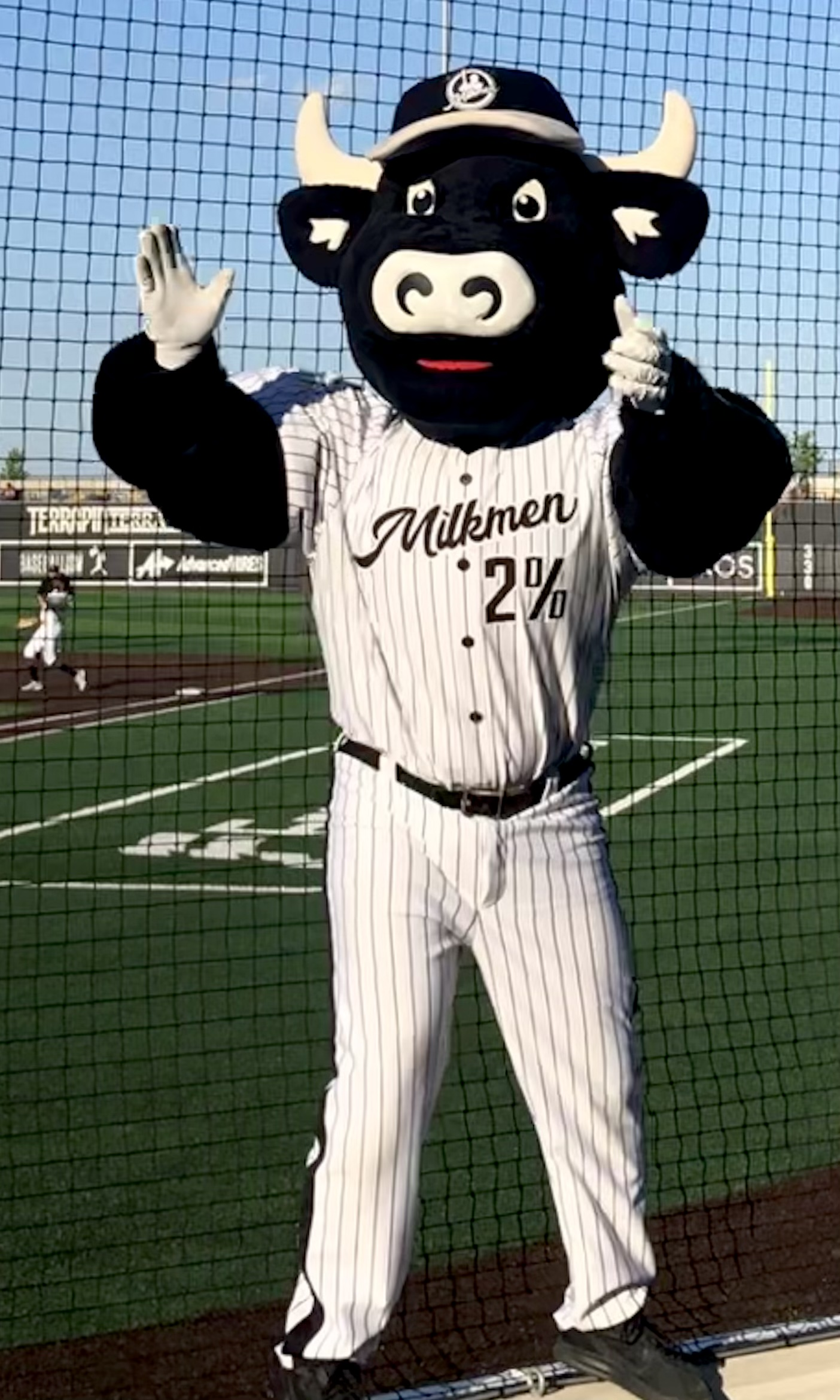
Milwaukee Milkmen mascot Bo Vine pumping up the crowd before a game at Franklin Field.

The Milkmen began their second year with new manager Anthony Barone at the helm, and the 2020 season in question due to the COVID-19 pandemic. The league, determined to hold a season, was able to find a way for six teams to play a 60 game shortened season. The Milkmen were one of the six American Association teams that continued forward with the season. There was a dispersal draft of the players on the six teams that sat out the season, allowing them the opportunity to play, and return to their original team at the end of the season. The league also suspended the leagues roster years of service rules for the season. While the Milwaukee Brewers were playing across town with no fans in the stands, the American Association had a unique policy to allow fans. Due to this the Milkmen were able to play in front of limited capacity crowds throughout the regular season and championship. The season got off to a rocky start with the third game of the opening series with the Chicago Dogs getting canceled due to a positive COVID-19 test. The Milkmen finished the season with a record of 34-26, and won their first championship over Sioux Falls in five games.

== Mascot ==
The Milkmen’s official mascot is an anthropomorphic black bull named “Bo Vine.” He wears a white pinstriped uniform with the number 2% in reference to 2% milk. Bo Vine's name is based on the word “bovine,” pertaining to cattle. He is also known by some as his colloquial name, "Stevie Melter".

== Season-by-season records ==
Milwaukee Milkmen season records
Season	League	Division	Regular Season					Postseason			Manager	Ref
Season	League	Division	Record	Win%	League	Division	GB	Record	Win%	Result	Manager	Ref
2019	AA	North	38-62	.380	T-10th	6th	26	—	—	Did not qualify	Gary McClure	
2020	AA	N/A	34-26	.567	1st	1st	—	4-1	.800	Won Miles Wolff Cup 4–1 to Sioux Falls Canaries	Anthony Barone	
2021	AA	North	59-41	.590	4th	3rd	4	0-1	.000	Wildcard team, Lost to Fargo-Moorhead	Anthony Barone	
2022	AA	East	53-47	.530	T-5th	3rd	1	6-4	.600	Division champion, Lost to Fargo-Moorhead	Anthony Barone	

== Roster ==
Milwaukee Milkmen roster
Active (25-man) roster	Coaching staff
Pitchers: 33 Shane Barringer; 7 Ben Gerl; 28 Nyan Hernandez; 23 Jordan Johnson; 83 Casey Marshalwitz; 18 Greg Minier; 88 Miguel Peña ‡; 95 Blake Purnell; 35 Sebastian Rodriguez; 31 Calvin Schapira; 1 Mark Simon; 26 Brody Sorenson; 90 Tahnaj Thomas ‡; 20 Davis Welch; 32 Ryley Widell; Catchers: 27 Erik Ostberg; 6 Oscar Santos; Infielders: 19 Willie Escala; 5 Chase Estep; 2 Trey Law; 10 Abdiel Layer; 29 Wendell Marrero; 16 José Sermo; 67 John Taylor; Outfielders: 24 Jaylin Davis; 13 Kyle Huckstorf; 4 Reggie Pruitt Jr.; 8 Armani Smith ‡	Manager: 5 Anthony Barone; Coaches: 26 D.J. Boston (hitting); -- Mason Davis (bullpen); Arielle Hachtel (trainer); 16 Jose Rodríguez (pitching); Chuck Schultz (clubhouse manager); Disabled list; ‡ Inactive list; § Suspended list; Roster updated August 9, 2024 Transactions

== Notable alumni ==
- Manny Corpas (2019)
- TJ House (2019)
- Joey Wagman (2019)
- Adam Walker (2019–2021)
- Henderson Álvarez (2020)
- Anthony Bender (2020)
- Tim Dillard (2020)
- Drew Hutchison (2020)
- David Washington (2020–2021)
- David Holmberg (2020–2021)
- A. J. Schugel (2020, 2022)
- Brian Johnson (2021)
- Misael Siverio (2021)
- José Espada (2022)
- Ben Holmes (2022)
- Héctor Sánchez (2022)
- Miguel Gómez (2022–2023)
- Michael Crouse (2023)
- Rudy Martin Jr. (2023)
- Justin Williams (2023)
- Jaylin Davis (2024–present)

== Managers ==
Milwaukee Milkmen Managers
Number	Manager	Seasons	Games	W	L	Win %	Championships	Ref
1	Gary McClure	2019	100	38	62	.380	N/A	
2	Anthony Barone	2020-present	160	93	67	.581	2020	

== Player awards ==
- Adam Brett Walker — 2020 Player of the year
- Peyton Gray — 2020 Rookie of the year
- Brett Vertigan — 2020 Defensive player of the year
- Adam Brett Walker — 2021 Player of the year
