= Great Lakes Patrol =

United States Navy and Coast Guard patrol

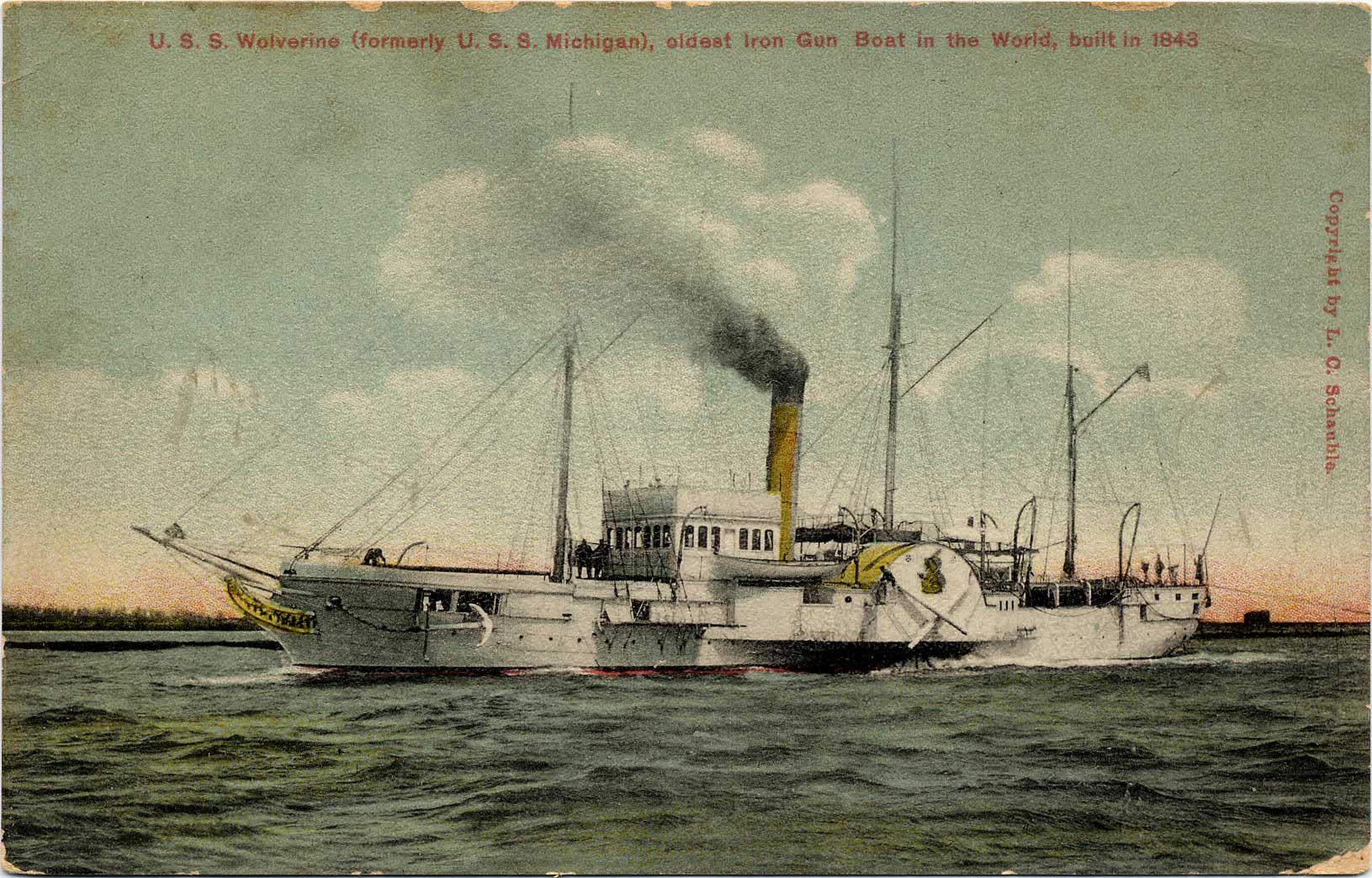
- A postcard of USS Michigan after her name was changed to USS Wolverine in 1905
- Objective: Suppress crime on the Great Lakes and protect the maritime border with Canada.
- Date: 1844–1920
- Executed by: United States

The Great Lakes Patrol was carried out by American naval forces, beginning in 1844, mainly to suppress criminal activity and to protect the maritime border with Canada. A small force of United States Navy, Coast Guard, and Revenue Service ships served in the Great Lakes throughout these operations. Through the decades, they were involved in several incidents with pirates and rebels.

The patrol was ended in 1920 when the US Coast Guard assumed full command of the operations as part of the Rum Patrol. This was initiated during the Prohibition era to try to reduce or end liquor smuggling from Canada across the rivers and lakes, a difficult task: the Canada–United States border is 8,891 kilometers (5,525 mi) long.

== Operations ==
=== Origin ===
The USS Michigan led the patrol, mostly singlehandedly, from its beginning on October 1, 1844 until the ship was retired in 1912. Michigan was the only American gunboat to patrol the Great Lakes. She was the first steam-powered, iron-hulled warship of the United States Navy, and was built in response to British authorities arming two steamships during the Rebellions of 1837–1838 in Canada.

Based in Erie, Pennsylvania throughout her career, the gunboat was commissioned on September 29, 1844 under Commander William Inman. Because the Great Lakes are vast inland seas in the north of the continent, during every winter parts of the lakes would freeze over, ending ship traffic. Even when passageways were open, icebergs would make navigation extremely hazardous and difficult. The Michigan usually sailed from about March to December before heading back for Erie for the winter. A type of house was built there at its mooring to protect the ship from the elements. During the winter, the officers and crew of the ship either stayed at their homes in Erie or at a government-owned hotel near the wharf.

=== Timber Rebellion ===
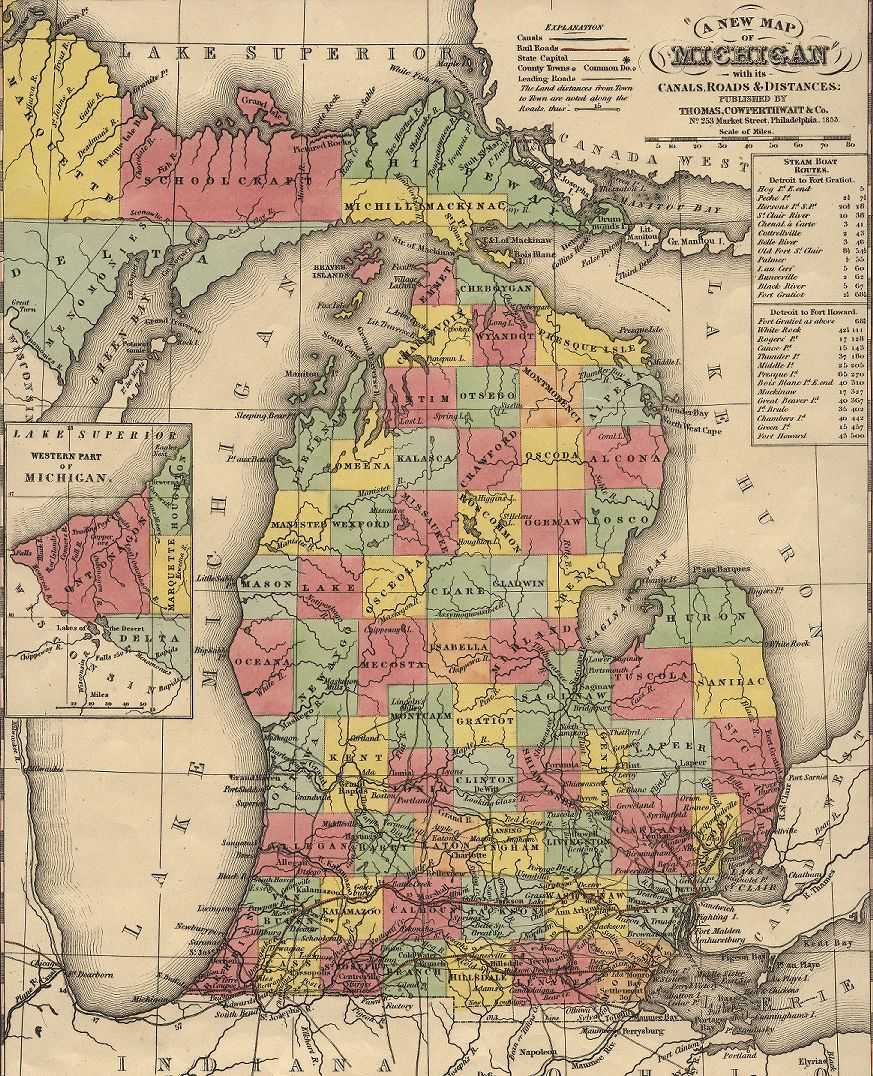
An 1853 map of Michigan.

In 1853 the USS Michigan was assigned to operate against criminals who were ravaging the logging industry. These so called timber pirates conducted illegal cutting of timber on federal land and then smuggled the valuable commodity out of the area in order to sell it. The areas most affected were in the western Great Lakes region, along the coasts of Michigan, Wisconsin, Illinois and Minnesota. Much of these forested areas controlled by the government were reserved for the building of new warships.

The illegal timber trade centered on Chicago and Milwaukee. It was nearly as violent as the alcohol trade, which was carried out over the same waters during the Prohibition era of the 1920s. In 1851 the government sent timber agents from the Department of the Interior to survey the land and work with local police and naval forces to stop the crime. When loads of wood were found to have been acquired illegally, the agents confiscated it and auctioned it off to the public, and later, in foreign markets. Many of the timber barons of the Great Lakes were involved in the illegal trade, and they began stealing back the wood or burning it before it could be shipped away.

Timber agents and smugglers came into conflict on the upper Mississippi River. An entirely separate United States Navy operation was conducted along the Calcasieu River of Louisiana. In 1852 one agent was killed by the pirates while sailing a raft loaded with stolen timber to Dubuque, Iowa. Newspapers such as The Chicago Tribune and The Chicago Democratic Press openly advocated armed resistance against the agents. One article in the Chicago Tribune read as follows; "if they [the agents] regard their personal welfare, they had better keep clear of a such transactions as that which they are about to engage in. If men cannot have a law protect their property, they will protect it themselves." The newspapers noted that most of the timber smugglers were from Wisconsin and Illinois, and usually raided Michigan's timberlands, causing much damage to the reserves. When Agent Isaac W. Willard was sent to the Great Lakes in 1853, he observed gangs of timber pirates defy and intimidate federal authorities and burn government-owned property. They burned boats loaded with logs at Grand Haven, as a re-enactment of the Boston Tea Party of 1773.

At this time the only American warship on the Great Lakes was the USS Michigan under Commander Abraham Bigelow. The only other vessel in the lakes which could have been used against the pirates was the revenue cutter USRC Ingham, described by one Detroit newspaper as being "burlesque" and unfit for duty. Because the Ingham had no steam engine, and was propelled solely by sails and wind, the more advanced steam-powered vessels used by the smugglers, could easily escape her.

In late April the Michigan headed for Buffalo to resupply before her yearly patrol. After that Commander Bigelow sailed west across Lake Erie, passing north along Detroit on Thursday, May 5, 1853 and then entered Lake Huron via Saint Clair River. On the following morning, at about 2:15 am, a lookout sighted a light in the darkness ahead of the Michigan. The officer on duty, Lieutenant George M. Ransom, ordered the helmsman to steer north by northwest, so as to avoid the light, but by 2:40 am the light was still ahead and "close upon us", according to one sailor. At 3:00 am the two ships were only a few hundred yards from each other and it appeared as though the two would pass closely by. However, the unknown ship suddenly turned ninety degrees to port side and headed straight for the Michigan's port bow.

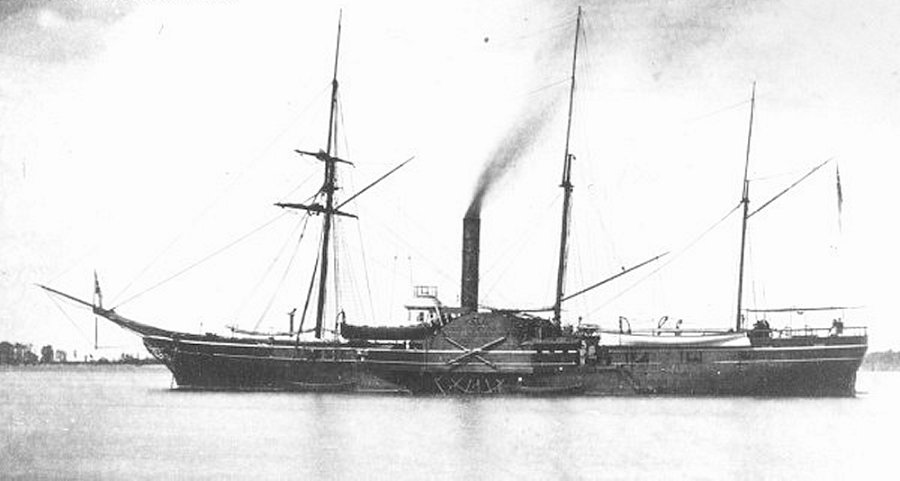
An early image of USS Michigan, circa 1860.

Lieutenant Ransom had only a few seconds to react, and he ordered the ship hard to port. Just as he was ringing the ship's bell to alarm the crew, the unknown ship crashed into the Michigan. Damage to the gunboat was heavy, though because of her iron hull, there was no leaking and the ship was not in danger of sinking. Commander Bigelow later said to Secretary of the Navy James Cochran Dobbin; "Had the Michigan been built of wood instead of iron, there is no doubt but that she would have been cut down before the water's edge and sunk." The other ship bounced off the Michigan's metal hull just after impact, and her commander turned his ship back onto course and continued on without stopping. This angered Bigelow, who proceeded to chase the fleeing steamer. After a brief pursuit, the American gunboat was close enough to the steamer for her crew to read the vessel's nameboard. The steamer proved to be the Buffalo; at the time, she was the largest steam-powered timber ship to sail the lakes. She was owned by a Mr. Walbridge and was headed for Chicago.

Though Lieutenant Ransom felt the ramming was deliberate, Commander Bigelow thought it must have been an accident. He brought his ship alongside the Buffalo and asked if the crew of the steamer needed any assistance. The crew answered to the negative so Bigelow let the ship go, but he followed it into Chicago for repairs. While it is not certain that the ramming was intentional or not, Bigelow endeavored to find evidence that it was. The commander filed a lawsuit against Mr. Walbridge: either his ship's captain had been irresponsible or he was trying to sink the Michigan.

The crew of the merchant ship Republic witnessed the Buffalo swerve off course to ram the gunboat, and the ship's captain submitted his report in writing; however, because the evidence was circumstantial, the case never went to trial. USS Michigan was put out of action for two months for repairs, which cost $1,674 to complete. Over the course of the next few weeks after refitting, the Michigan captured several timber pirates with the assistance of Agent Willard and a Marine Corps detachment. These operations are credited with ending the 1853 Timber Rebellion in a federal victory. But the illegal logging trade continued to as late as the 1870s.

=== Beaver-Mackinac War ===
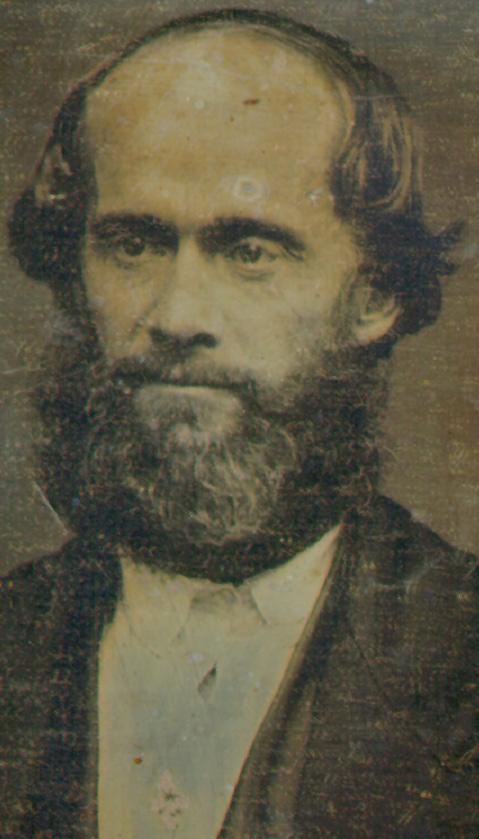
James Strang in 1856.

The Michigan was also involved in the Beaver-Mackinac War. In 1850 James Strang crowned himself the king of Beaver Island, at the head of Lake Michigan. Eventually he began forcing his radical beliefs on some of his mainstream Mormon followers, known as Strangites. The commander of the Michigan was ordered to arrest Strang in May 1851, which was done without conflict. Strang was held in custody for some time and then released, but on Monday, June 16, 1856, he was assassinated at St. James, in front of the Michigan. Captain Charles H. McBlair, commander of the gunboat, had invited the king aboard the ship. He was shot in the back with a pistol at close range as he was waiting on the docks. The assassins, Alexander Wentworth and "Dr. J. Atkyn [sic]", who were said to be blackmailing the Strangites, fled to the Michigan for sanctuary. They were later released at Mackinaw without being charged. Strang was shot three times, once in the head, but survived for three weeks before dying on July 9 from his injuries.

The Mormons assumed that Captain McBlair knew about the plot beforehand. Others accused him of being in on it. On July 5, a large mob from Michigan landed on Beaver Island and forcibly removed nearly 3,000 inhabitants with small steam boats. Many people were robbed first in what Byron M. Cutcheon later called "the most disgraceful day in Michigan history". The Mormons were taken to Voree, where some of them stayed while most others dispersed across the country. Beaver Island was later reoccupied by Irish Americans, who established a colony that flourished in the 1860s and 1870s.

=== American Civil War ===
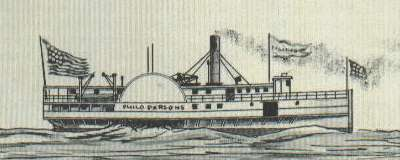
The SS Philo Parsons.

During the American Civil War, USS Michigan kept up with her yearly patrol against smugglers and other criminals. At that time the gunboat was still the only American warship in those waters, other than six revenue cutters, which were largely ineffective in their operations against crime. Because the Civil War had such a high mortality rate, the government enforced a military draft. There were draft riots by working-class men who resented being sent to war when wealthier men could buy their way out. The most notable one was in New York City, where largely ethnic Irish attacked African Americans as the scapegoats for their anger. A race riot took place in Detroit in 1863, also about labor and economic competition issues at bottom, and another in Buffalo, New York. The USS Michigan spent much of the war patrolling back and forth between those urban areas.

By 1863 Johnson's Island in Lake Erie was used as a prisoner of war camp for Confederates. The Southern government knew of the camp. In 1863 Lieutenant William Henry Murdaugh of the Confederate States Navy suggested to President Jefferson Davis a plan to gain control of the lakes by capturing the Michigan. Ultimately Murdaugh's plan was never implemented. But in 1864 Davis authorized Captain Charles H. Cole of the Confederate States Army to go to the Great Lakes with Captain John Yates Beall and organize the escape of prisoners from Johnson's Island and Camp Chase.

Captain Cole had been a prisoner at Johnson's Island before his escape, so he knew the area and the people well. With Beall, Cole collected thirty-five volunteers to take over the Michigan. He cunningly befriended several of the gunboat's officers. Cole also contacted with the Sons of Liberty, a secret society that sympathized with the Confederate cause. The captain organized the successful infiltration of the 128th Ohio Infantry Regiment which guarded the prison camps. Ten of his volunteers posed as Union troops, with orders to assist in the capture of Johnson's Island after the Michigan had been secured.

On September 19, 1864, the rebels launched their attack. That night Captain Cole went aboard the Michigan at Sandusky to dine with his 'friends" while waiting for Captain Beall and the volunteers to arrive in a captured merchant ship. The Union knew all about the plot from a Confederate colonel at Johnson's Islands, who had learned of the Cole's plan and informed the prison guards. The colonel did not know when the attack would take place, but the men of USS Michigan were ordered to stay on high alert.

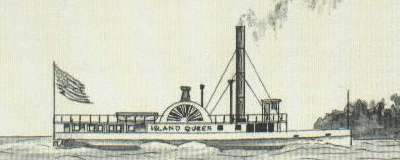
The steamship SS Island Queen.

While Coe was gaining access to the Michigan, Captain Beall was preparing to take over the ferry Philo Parsons. The ferry cruised between American and Canadian ports on Lake Erie. Beall separated his men into small groups who boarded the Philo Parsons as passengers in Canada. When all of the volunteers were aboard, Captain Beall waited until after the ship had left Kellys Island, Ohio to take over the ship. He accomplished this without bloodshed. Beall allowed the passengers to leave, including several recently discharged men from the 130th Ohio Infantry. A little later, as the rebels were sailing to meet with Captain Coe and the Michigan, a steamer named Island Queen came alongside the Philo Parsons. A sailor tied the two vessels together. When the rebels realized this, they attacked the Island Queen, and a brief gunfight erupted between Beall's men and the steamer's crew. One man was wounded in what was the northernmost naval skirmish of the war. The rebels tried to sail the ship with the Philo Parsons on to Sandusky. But, at a position three miles off Middle Hull Island, Captain Beall ordered the Island Queen to be run aground on a reef and burned.

About the same time, seventeen members of the Confederate boarding party became convinced that the Union knew what they were up to, so they refused to participate any further. As result, Beall abandoned his cruise. Thus the plot to capture the Michigan and liberate the prisoners on Johnson's Island failed before it really began.

Rebel activity in the North did not end. Confederate agents in Canada launched an expedition to the coastal town of St. Albans, Vermont across Lake Champlain, one month after the incident on Lake Erie. The rebels, under Lieutenant Bennett H. Young, robbed two banks and killed or wounded three civilians.

=== Fenian Raids ===
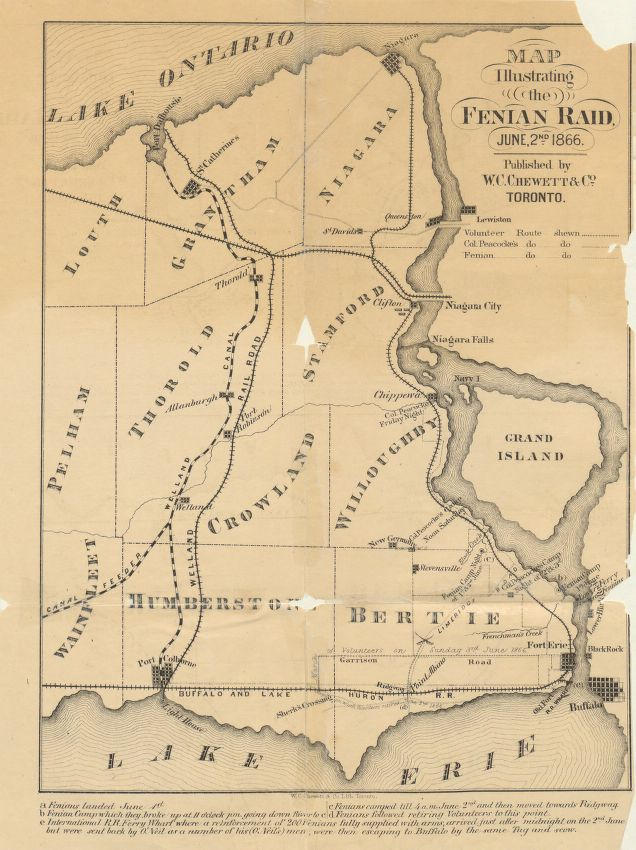
A map of the 1866 Fenian raid into Ontario.

The next conflict involving the patrol was the Fenian Raids into Canada and New Brunswick by Irish Republicans based in the United States. The Fenian Brotherhood, many of whose members were battle hardened Union and Confederate veterans of the American Civil War, organized a paramilitary army spread out on both sides the international border. There were five notable raids in between 1866 and 1871, all launched from the United States, against British Army targets. The Fenians, who spit into two rival factions, were under the leadership of John O'Mahony and the more violent group under William R. Roberts. Both O'Mahoney and Roberts were of the opinion that a successful invasion of the British Empire in North America could force Queen Victoria to grant political independence to Ireland. The first notable raid was launched in 1866 by about 700 men of O'Mahony's faction. They crossed the St. Lawrence River border from Maine and attacked Campobello Island. When the United States Federal Government learned of this they sent a force to the island which dispersed the rebels. Shortly after Robert's followers attacked Ridgeway, Ontario and Fort Erie. At the Battle of Ridgeway, on June 2, about 750 Fenians under Brigadier General, James O'Neill, routed a force of 850 Canadian troops.

The battle was the largest during the raids and the first Industrial era engagement to involve the Canadian Army. It was also the last battle in Ontario against a foreign invasion. After that the rebels attacked Fort Erie the same day and forced its surrender. In all the Fenians lost about ten men killed and twenty wounded in the two battles while the Canadians lost nine killed and forty-three wounded, as well as fifty-nine men captured. Fearing that the British Army would arrive soon, O'Neill tried to cross the Niagara River, back into New York but the men of USS Michigan were waiting for them. The gunboat, had arrived the day before to intercept rebel reinforcements and her crew accepted the surrender of hundreds of Fenians. Meanwhile, General Ulysses S. Grant, a future American president, and General George Meade went to Buffalo to examine the situation, prevent further raids, and disarm all Fenian paramilitary units. They coordinated their operations with the USS Michigan which led to the arrest of General Thomas William Sweeny who was in overall command of the invasion on charges of violating American neutrality. However, Sweeny had only recently been a Union commander in the Civil War so he was released from custody not long after his arrest.

=== Nellie Johnson Mutiny ===
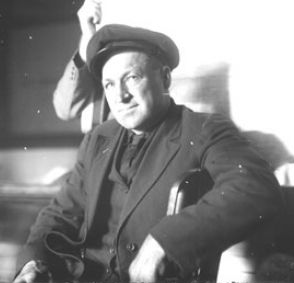
Captain Dan Seavey around the end of his career.

Captain Dan Seavey is the most remembered pirate to sail the Great Lakes. He was born in 1867 and briefly served in the United States Navy before becoming a criminal. Seavey was known as a fighting man for many exploits, including bar fights and episodes of that nature. His ship was the small fourteen-ton topsail schooner named Wanderer, which was allegedly armed with a cannon at one point. She was built around 1900 and originally intended for the Pabst family who owned the Pabst Brewing Company. It is not known how Seavey acquired her. Other than sneaking into a port at night and stealing freight from the docks, Captain Seavey had several different, legitimate professions over the course of his lifetime. He owned a saloon at one point, worked in the timber trade, and participated in the Yukon Gold Rush from 1896 to 1899. Seavey also claimed to have sunk a rival fishing ship with his cannon, killing everyone on board. While it is not known if this story is true, according to author Fred Neuschel, Seavey was guilty of manslaughter at least. The most remembered story of the pirate was that of the schooner Nellie Johnson, on which Seavey was a crewman. In 1908, Seavey was serving on the Nellie Johnson when he decided to incite two of his fellow crew members to mutiny and take the schooner from either Grand Haven, Michigan or Chicago, depending on varying sources.

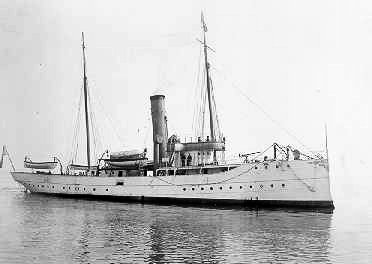
USRC Tuscarora, circa 1902

Some sources say the pirate acted alone. Seavey supposedly provided the ship with alcohol and one night, when most of the crew were drunk, he threw all of them from the ship and sailed the vessel out of the harbor. In response, the captain of the Nellie Johnson contacted the authorities who dispatched the revenue cutter USRC Tuscarora to find the ship. The Tuscarora was a small steam-powered vessel launched in 1901 and she went after the pirates for a few days until they abandoned their prize and escaped to shore. According to Neuschel, there are several exaggerated accounts of the chase. Some said that the Tuscarora found Seavey and opened fire, but the captain was able to steer the schooner out harm's way. Others said that after a warning shot Seavey surrendered and the Nellie Johnson was boarded by the Tuscarora's crew. Neither story is true. Seavey was eventually apprehended on land by a United States Marshal. He was arrested for "mutiny and revolt" but was released when the ship's owner failed to press charges. Seavey became a marshal himself and he is generally accepted to have retired to his home somewhere around Beaver Island in the 1920s.

== See also ==
- Yangtze Patrol
- African Slave Trade Patrol
- Neutrality Patrol
- Ice Patrol
- Gunboat diplomacy
