= Trade (sports) =

Transfer of players between teams

In professional sports within the United States and Canada, a trade is a sports league transaction between sports clubs involving the exchange of player rights from one team to another. Though player rights are the primary trading assets, draft picks and cash are other assets that may be supplemented to consummate a trade, either packaged alongside player rights to be transferred to another team, or as standalone assets in exchange for player rights or draft picks in return. Typically, trades are completed between two clubs, but there are instances where trades are consummated between three or more clubs.

NHL trades only involve players who are under contract with their current teams or RFA players whose rights are owned by the team; free agent players, whose contracts have expired (July 1), cannot be traded by their former teams, and are free to join a different team.

In Major League Baseball, a player to be named later can be used to finalize the terms of a trade at a later date, but draft picks are not admissible as trading assets (with the exception of competitive balance draft selections awarded to teams). In Major League Soccer, besides current MLS players and draft picks, clubs may also trade MLS rights to non-MLS players, allocation money, allocation rankings, and international player slots.

== No-trade clause ==
A no-trade clause is an amendment to a contract, usually relevant in North American professional sports, wherein a player may not be traded to another club without the player's consent. Sometimes this clause is implemented by the club itself, but the vast majority are requested by the athlete and their sports agent to avoid being sent to a non-contending club or a club in an unattractive city. In many cases, these no-trade clauses are limited, where a club may be limited to trading the athlete only at certain times, or only to a certain team or geographical area.

No-trade clauses are found in most sports in North America, including Major League Baseball, the National Football League, the National Basketball Association, the National Hockey League, Major League Soccer, and some minor leagues around the country. Many European leagues, mostly professional soccer and basketball, also implement these contract amendments.

Each league usually has its own rules regarding these clauses; for example in the NBA, no-trade clauses can only be negotiated into contracts when a player has at least four years of service for the team he is signing the contract with and at least eight years total in the NBA. Other leagues have other varying rules, for example in MLB the "Ten and Five" rule gives most players limited control on their tradability once they meet the ten and five criteria, which means the player has played in the league ten seasons and with the current team for at least five.

In the NHL, these rights have been cited as a factor contributing to the decline in player trades in some seasons, with critics citing examples where "done deals" were blown up by "selfish players." Despite having a no-trade clause in the contract, players have often demanded to be traded and then use the no-trade clause to select a preferable destination team, even though this would not give the maximum value to the team he is departing. To avoid such a potential situation an astute general manager would first demand that the player waive the no-trade clause before considering a trade, though this would reduce the player's leverage.

=== Waiver of no-trade clause ===
Often the no-trade clause is waived by the players themselves, usually in order to play for a contending team.

==== MLB ====
In one dramatic case in 2001, Tampa Bay Devil Rays first baseman Fred McGriff mulled over waiving his rights for nearly a month before ultimately accepting a deal which sent him to the Chicago Cubs.

In 2017, Miami Marlins outfielder Giancarlo Stanton rejected trades both to the St. Louis Cardinals and San Francisco Giants, saying that he would refuse to waive his no-trade clause for any teams other than the contenders Chicago Cubs, hometown Los Angeles Dodgers, up-and-coming New York Yankees, and reigning 2017 World Series champion Houston Astros. Stanton was eventually traded to the Yankees for Starlin Castro, Jorge Guzman, and José Devers.

==== NBA ====
In 2007, Kobe Bryant was willing to waive his no-trade clause with the Los Angeles Lakers in order to be dealt to either the Phoenix Suns or the Chicago Bulls, but in this case, Bryant's own pickiness as far as where he would like to play limited the Lakers' ability to move him, and eventually no trade was made at all.

In 2023, Bradley Beal agreed to waive his no-trade clause only one year into his new five-year deal with the Washington Wizards (who went into new management after the Wizards' 2022–23 season concluded) in order to be dealt to a few teams in mind, primarily the Miami Heat or Phoenix Suns. Despite the threat of harsher penalties that would be implemented for future seasons to come, Beal ultimately agreed to be traded to the Suns, with Phoenix agreeing to trade star point guard Chris Paul, Landry Shamet, and multiple second round picks and pick swaps to make the trade happen.

==== NHL ====
Darryl Sittler's no-trade clause protected him from being moved, when Toronto Maple Leafs owner Harold Ballard and manager Punch Imlach wanted to get rid of or reduce Sittler's influence on the team (Imlach instead traded Lanny McDonald to spite Sittler); a few years later Sittler waived the clause when relations between him and Ballard deteriorated. Dany Heatley demanded a trade from the Ottawa Senators at the end of the 2008–09 season; a deal was in place to send Heatley to the Edmonton Oilers on June 30, but Heatley refused to waive his no-trade clause (the Oilers had missed the playoffs for three straight seasons), so he was traded to the San Jose Sharks instead, with the Senators receiving a much lesser package than the one offered by the Oilers. Rick Nash demanded a trade from the Columbus Blue Jackets during the 2011–12 NHL season, but the deal could not be completed due to general manager Scott Howson's high asking price from the teams to whom Nash would have permitted a trade. The holdout lasted into the summer of 2012, when he was traded to the New York Rangers for Brandon Dubinsky, Tim Erixon, Artem Anisimov, and the Rangers' first-round pick in the 2013 draft.

In an unusual case, Mats Sundin refused to waive his no-trade clause during the latter part of the 2007–08 season, even though his Maple Leafs were on track to miss the playoffs, and his contract was set to expire after the season concluded. Leafs management requested that Sundin waive his no-trade clause in order for the team to rebuild by acquiring potential young talent or draft picks, and Sundin was coveted by several teams looking to bolster their roster for the playoffs before the trade deadline. Sundin said he did not believe in being a "rental player" and that if he won the Stanley Cup, he wanted to do it over the course of a whole season.

== Trade deadline ==
A trade deadline (or trading deadline) is a rule regulating the trading of professional players' contracts between clubs. In Major League Baseball and the National Hockey League, players acquired through trade after the trade deadline are ineligible for postseason play in that season, unless the respective league allows them to replace an injured player on the roster. In the National Football League, National Basketball Association and Major League Soccer, post-deadline trades are not allowed. This term is used mainly in North America. In the approach to the deadline, there is heightened activity and interest in trades.

The purpose of a trade deadline is to keep competitive balance towards the end of the season.

=== MLB ===
The traditional Major League Baseball (MLB) trade deadline of July 31 has been in effect since the 1986 Basic Agreement which resulted from the resolution of the 1985 MLB strike. Commissioner Rob Manfred moved it to August 1 for the 2016 season only, as July 31, 2016 was a Sunday. However, following the 2023 Collective Bargaining Agreement, the league gained more scheduling flexibility. The deadline now can fall anywhere between a July 28 and August 3 window. After the All-Star break, teams will determine whether or not they are in position to contend for the postseason. Because of free agency and the lack of a salary cap in baseball, players in the final year of their contract are often put on the "trading block" by many of the non-playoff contending teams. Smaller market teams that feel they cannot pay veteran players' high salaries will often attempt to trade them to a postseason contender, in exchange for some minor league prospects or other players who might be able to help them in the future.

Until the 2019 season, MLB had a separate waiver trade deadline of August 31. Between August 1 and August 31, players were required to clear waivers before they could be traded. The waivers were revocable, meaning that a team could revoke the claim of another team on their player. The August 31 waiver trade deadline was eliminated effective with the 2019 season.

The trade deadline was instituted by MLB in response to various attempts by two New York City-based ballclubs, the Giants and Yankees, to use their financial advantages to tilt their respective leagues' competitive balance in their favor from 1917 through 1922. In the Yankees' case, most of its dealings were with the Boston Red Sox. The American League (AL) established MLB's first-ever such rule in 1920 as an indirect result of the Red Sox's sale of Babe Ruth to the Yankees. It prohibited the trading and selling of ballplayers between August 1 and the conclusion of the World Series. A uniform rule serving both major leagues, which was adopted prior to the 1923 season, set the deadline at June 15. The date, chosen by MLB Commissioner Kenesaw Mountain Landis based on a suggestion from Pittsburgh Pirates owner Barney Dreyfuss, remained in effect through the 1985 season.

=== NBA ===
The National Basketball Association's deadline falls on the 16th Thursday of the season (usually in mid-February) at 3pm Eastern Time. The deadline for the 2011–12 season was on March 15, 2012, due to the 2011–12 NBA lockout. In the NBA, post-deadline trades are forbidden, although teams are allowed to sign free agents and call up players from the G League until the end of the regular season.

=== NFL ===
The National Football League's deadline is the Tuesday following Week 9 of the regular season, which is typically in early November.

Usually, there is fairly little activity on this day compared to the other three major sports leagues. The early deadline, along with players having to learn a whole new system on the fly, along with the salary cap often makes it difficult to make blockbuster trades on this day, unlike most other sports. Post-deadline trades are forbidden in the NFL, unless the trade was initially proposed prior to the deadline.

=== NHL ===
The National Hockey League's trade deadline is calculated as the 40th day before the final day of the regular season, ensuring that it typically falls during the last week of February or the first week of March. Much like Major League Baseball and the National Basketball Association, the NHL's trade deadline is often a period of increased player movement; teams that are either making a final push to secure a playoff spot or hoping to go deep into the playoffs attempt to trade to acquire key veterans or proven scorers in order to solidify their rosters. Conversely, teams that are rebuilding with younger players may be willing to trade away their more expensive players in order to "dump" (reduce) salary and get draft picks or prospects in return. Players on playoff-contending teams who are injured and not expected to return for the current season may be offered to teams that are rebuilding, since they will be of no value to a team's playoff prospects in the current season but may be of value to another team for future seasons. Also, players who are about to become unrestricted free agents and have indicated that they do not intend to return to their current teams may be traded away so that those teams will get something in return, instead of seeing such players sign with another team while their former teams receive nothing.

The NHL trade deadline also generates extensive discussion among hockey fans and analysts, with much speculation and discussion about which players will get traded and where they will go. In Canada, the NHL trade deadline receives extensive media coverage, with the sports networks TSN and Sportsnet devote much of the day to speculation and coverage of trades.

=== Association football ===
Association football clubs have two transfer windows per season. In most countries, one falls during the middle of the season and the other runs during the period between seasons, generally called the "close season" in Europe and "off-season" in North America. For those countries with seasons starting in August or September such as most European countries, the midseason transfer window usually falls in January, and the other one opens from June to September. In countries with seasons that operate entirely within a calendar year, like many leagues in Latin America or Northern Europe, as well as North America's Major League Soccer, the midseason transfer window opens in July or August, while the other starts from March to April. The difference between a transfer window and a trade deadline is that players cannot be bought or sold outside these transfer window periods. The notion of transfer windows was initially introduced in Europe, and subsequently adopted by FIFA. Like North America's trade deadline, there is greatly increased activity and interest as the close of a transfer window draws near.

==== MLS ====
In Major League Soccer, trades between MLS teams that involve players and player transfers from outside MLS must occur during either the primary transfer window (typically February - May) or secondary transfer window (July - August).

The MLS roster freeze date falls on September 15, at which time teams must submit their final roster that cannot be changed through the day after the MLS Cup.

== See also ==
- Major League Baseball transactions#Trades
- Player to be named later
- Sign-and-trade deal
- Transfer (association football)
- List of largest NFL trades
