= Starlin =

Starlin may refer to:

- Jim Starlin (born 1949), an American comic book writer and artist
- Starlin Castro (born 1990), a professional Major League baseball player
