= List of American Association rosters =

Below are the full rosters and coaching staff of the 11 teams of American Association of Professional Baseball.

== East Division ==
=== Chicago Dogs ===
Chicago Dogs § Roster

=== Cleburne Railroaders ===
Cleburne Railroaders § Roster

=== Gary SouthShore RailCats ===
Gary SouthShore RailCats § Roster

=== Kane County Cougars ===
Kane County Cougars § Roster

=== Lake Country DockHounds ===
Lake Country DockHounds § Roster

=== Milwaukee Milkmen ===
Milwaukee Milkmen § Roster

== West Division ==
=== Fargo-Moorhead RedHawks ===
Fargo-Moorhead RedHawks § Roster

=== Kansas City Monarchs ===
Kansas City T-Bones § Roster

=== Lincoln Saltdogs ===
Lincoln Saltdogs § Roster

=== Sioux City Explorers ===
Sioux City Explorers § Roster

=== Sioux Falls Canaries ===
Sioux Falls Canaries § Roster

=== Winnipeg Goldeyes ===
Winnipeg Goldeyes § Roster
