= Brett Conine =

American baseball player (born 1996)

Free agent
- Pitcher
- Born: October 16, 1996 (age 29); Orange, California, U.S.
- Bats: Right Throws: Right

Brett Michael Conine (born October 16, 1996) is an American professional baseball pitcher who is currently a free agent.

== Amateur career ==
Conine attended El Modena High School in Orange, California, where he played three years of varsity baseball. In 2013, his sophomore year, he pitched to a 1.94 ERA over 43 1/3 innings. Undrafted in the 2015 Major League Baseball draft, he enrolled at California State University, Fullerton where he played college baseball.

In 2016, Conine's freshman year, he made 15 appearances (three starts) in which he went 3–3 with a 5.10 ERA, striking out 24 batters over thirty innings. As a sophomore in 2017, Conine moved into the closer role, compiling 15 saves and a 1.39 ERA over 31 relief appearances. In 2016 and 2017, he played collegiate summer baseball with the Wareham Gatemen of the Cape Cod Baseball League. In 2018, his junior season, he appeared in 32 games in relief, going 4–2 with a 4.09 ERA. After the season, he was selected by the Houston Astros in the 11th round of the 2018 Major League Baseball draft.

== Professional career ==
=== Houston Astros ===
Conine signed with the Astros and made his professional debut that year with the Tri-City ValleyCats of the Low–A New York–Penn League, going 1–1 with a 1.99 ERA over 31 2/3 innings. In 2019, he began the year with the Quad Cities River Bandits of the Single–A Midwest League before being promoted to the Fayetteville Woodpeckers of the High–A Carolina League in May. After 15 games with Fayetteville, he was promoted to the Corpus Christi Hooks of the Double–A Texas League in August, with whom he finished the year. Over 25 games (15 starts) between the three clubs, Conine went 8–4 with a 2.20 ERA, striking out 134 batters over 114 1/3 innings.

Conine did not play in a game in 2020 due to the cancellation of the minor league season because of the COVID-19 pandemic. For the 2021 season, he was assigned to the Sugar Land Skeeters of the Triple-A West. After going 4–0 with a 0.95 ERA over 19 innings, he was named the Triple-A West Pitcher of the Month for May. Over 25 games (18 starts) for the Skeeters, Conine went 8–4 with a 5.66 ERA and 83 strikeouts over 98 2/3 innings pitched which led the team. He returned to Sugar Land for the 2022 season. Over 29 games (14 starts), he posted a 6-3 record with a 6.86 ERA and 87 strikeouts over 106 1/3 innings. Conine was released by the Astros on March 19, 2023.

=== Lake Country DockHounds ===
On February 28, 2024, Conine signed with the Lake Country DockHounds of the American Association of Professional Baseball. In 19 games (18 starts) for the DockHounds, he compiled a 7-4 record and 4.19 ERA with 87 strikeouts across 105 1/3 innings pitched.

In 2025, Conine started 20 games for the DockHounds and went 3-10 with a 4.17 ERA and 101 strikeouts across 110 innings.
