= USCGC Ingham =

USCGC Ingham may refer to the following ships of the United States Coast Guard:

- USCGC Ingham (WHEC-35), originally Samuel D. Ingham, a preserved Treasury-class cutter
- USCGC Ingham (WMSM-917), a Heritage-class cutter currently contracted for construction

== See also ==
- USRC Ingham, ships with the same name which saw service with the US Revenue Cutter Service
