= Dockhounds Ballpark =

Baseball stadium in Wisconsin, US

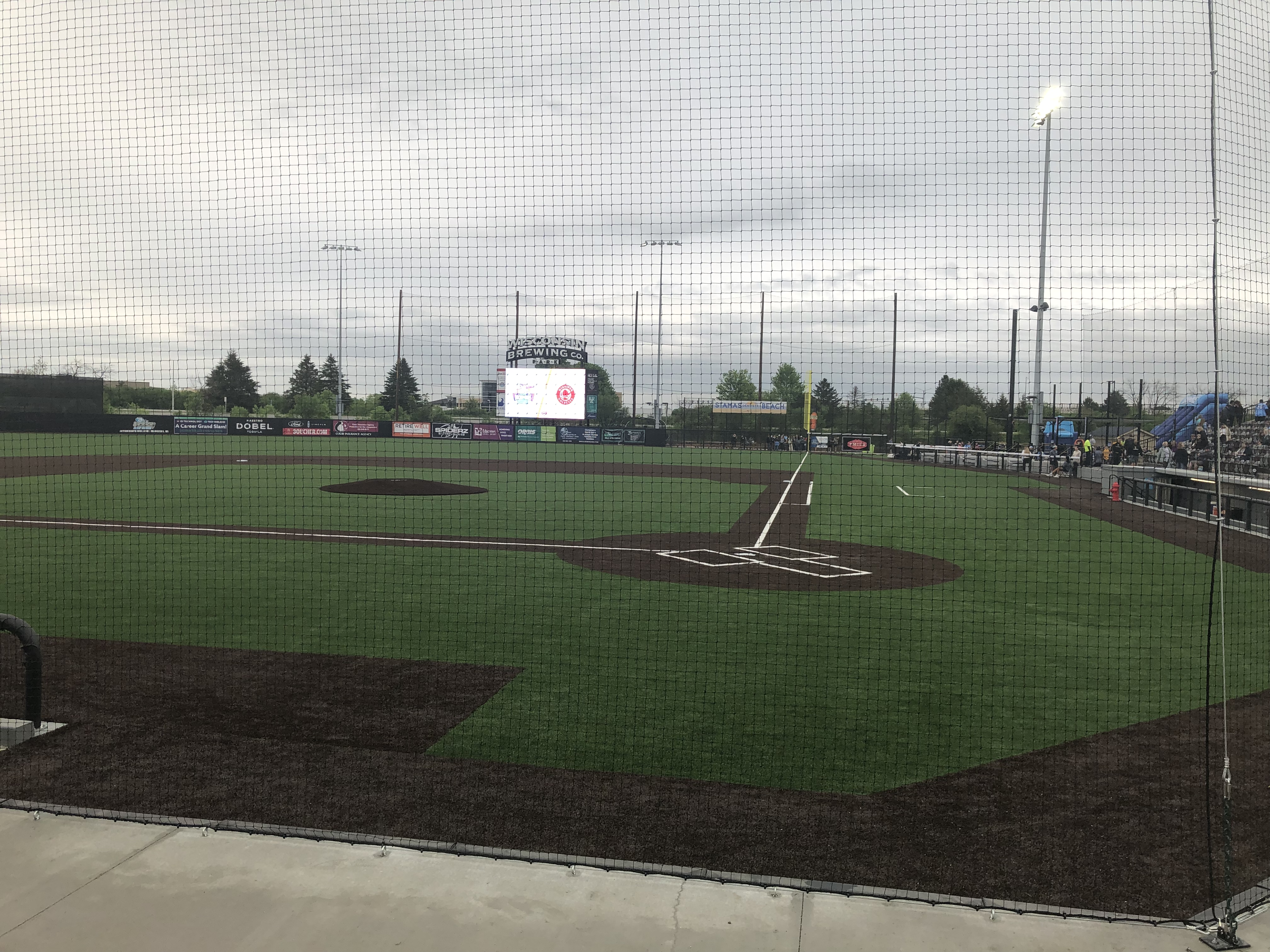
- The park in 2022

- Location within Wisconsin Location within the United States
- Interactive map of Dockhounds Ballpark
- Full name: Dockhounds Ballpark at Lake Country Live
- Address: 1011 Blue Ribbon Circle N. Oconomowoc, Wisconsin
- Coordinates: 43.0665°N 88.4755°W
- Capacity: 3,641
- Surface: Artificial turf
- Record attendance: 3,999 (May 20, 2022)
- Field size: Right field: 325'; Center field: 400'; Left field: 325'

Construction
- Groundbreaking: June 29, 2021
- Opened: May 20, 2022

Tenant
- Lake Country DockHounds (AA) 2022–present

Website
- www.dockhounds.com/stadium/

Dockhounds Ballpark is a baseball stadium in Oconomowoc, Wisconsin, part of the Milwaukee metropolitan area. Built in 2021, the ballpark is home to the Lake Country DockHounds, an independent professional baseball team in the American Association of Professional Baseball. The stadium was designed to fit soccer or lacrosse fields, and has an all artificial turf field so it can be used from when the snow melts to when the snow falls. The stadium is one part of the larger Lake Country Live development that also includes an attached indoor training facility.

== History ==
Investors with Diamond Club Entertainment, LLC, began searching for a site for a baseball stadium in Waukesha County back in 2018. The first site was in the city of Pewaukee. Originally called Lake Country Commons, the proposal included a public market and two multi-family housing units in addition to the stadium. With opposition mounting, the focus shifted to a farm along I-94 in nearby Summit. This proposal included an indoor sports training facility along with the stadium. The focus then shifted down the road to the Pabst Farms development in Oconomowoc. On March 3, 2020, the Oconomowoc common council approved the building of the stadium and attached training facility. Just weeks later, Governor Tony Evers signed his safer at home order as a result of the emerging COVID-19 pandemic in the United States, putting a temporary halt to construction.

Ground was broken for the stadium on June 29, 2021. The DockHounds partnered with the Wisconsin Brewing Company, a craft brewing company based in Verona, Wisconsin; in a naming rights deal, the stadium was named Wisconsin Brewing Company Park until 2026. The stadium includes a 5-barrel brewery, operated by Wisconsin Brewing Company, where the company uses the stadium's patrons to test new products before ramping up production at the main brewery in Verona. The park opened on May 20, 2022, to a sold-out crowd of 3,999 fans.
