= Pabst Farms =

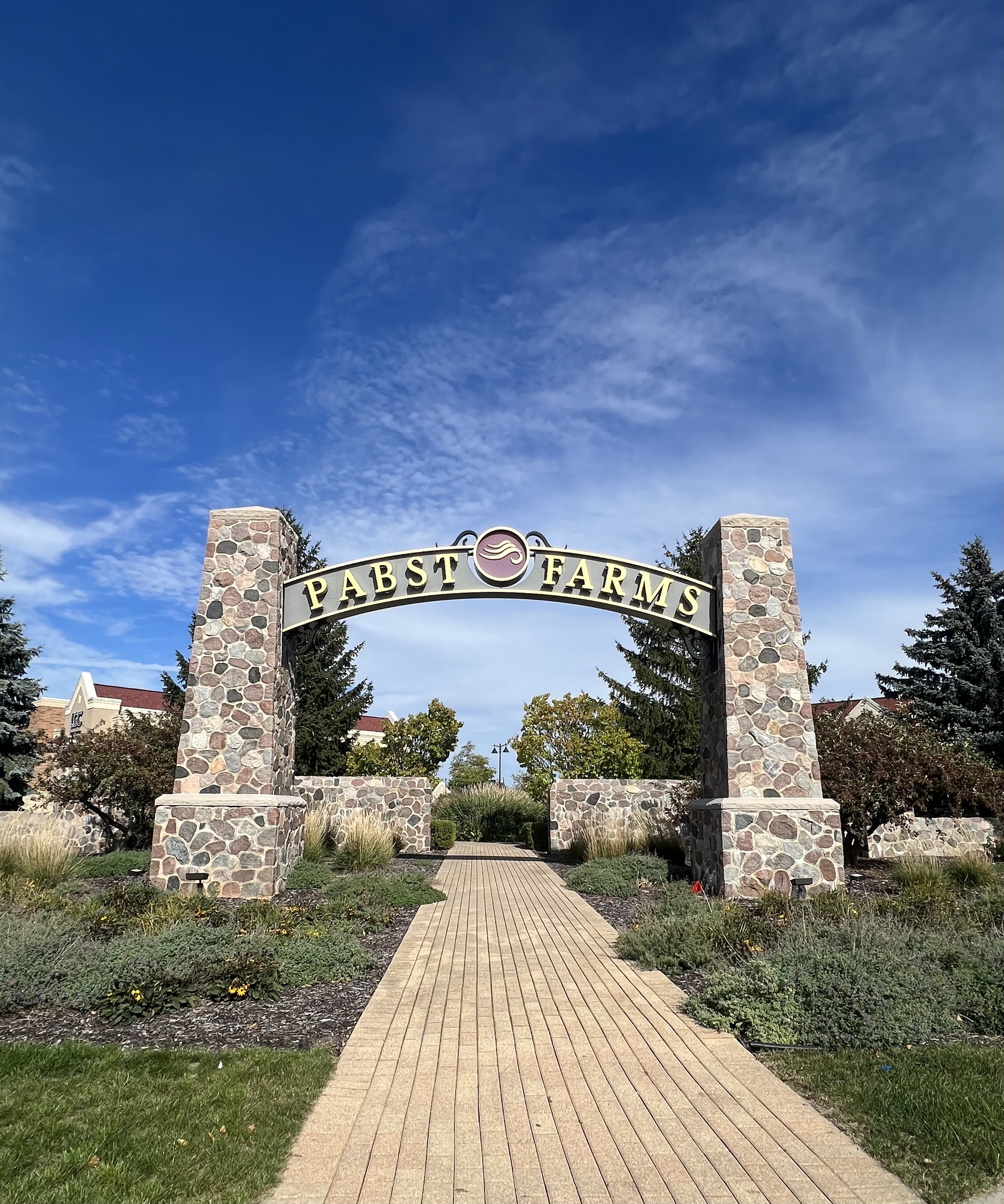
- State: Wisconsin
- Country: United States
- Coordinates: 43°4′28″N 88°27′26″W

Pabst Farms is a 1,500-acre (6.1 km^{2}) development on former farmland in Oconomowoc, Wisconsin, about 35 miles (56 km) west of Milwaukee. The location currently hosts the YMCA, multiple super markets such as Metro Market, restaurants and hotels. The planned development will include thousands of homes and significant office space, as well as a small amount of parkland. In 2021 construction started on Wisconsin Brewing Company Park, the home to the Lake Country DockHounds.

== Founding ==
Jacob Best founded the Pabst Brewing company in 1844, which was named after Frederick Pabst in 1889. Pabst Farms began in 1906 when Fred Pabst, jr. made his first purchase of land in what was then the Town of Summit in Waukesha County, Wisconsin.

200 acres have been set aside for businesses by Peter Bell and Bill Niemann. Pabst Farms is a full 1,500 acres on both side of interstate 94 at highway 67 being developed that will consist of retail, commercial and residential areas and a village center. The city and the developers came to the agreement that they would delay for at least a year any land sale to Walmart or Sam's Club. Both have showed interest in the mall.

== Development ==
The Oconomowoc Fire Station at Pabst Farms is a combination of Oconomowoc and Summit. The station is 14,000 sq. ft. and is designed to blend with the other buildings in Pabst Farms. The station offers housing for full-time EMS and support for eight apparatus. Training is an important to everyone in the station and the new station includes a training room for 60 as well as training stations for firefighters to practice getting in and out of confined places, space entry and rappel practice. Other features include, solar water heating, daylighting, rainwater harvest, and LED lighting. The department also provides bicycle racks, plug-in charging station for electric vehicles and dedicated parking for low-emitting vehicles. The property was once owned by the Pabst family, of local brewing fame, and was used as a demonstration farm and for recreation.

== See also ==
- Great Lakes Patrol
