= Dan Seavey =

American Great Lakes pirate (1865–1949)

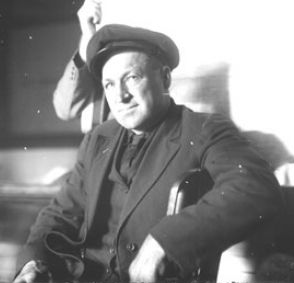
- Dan Seavey, 1920
- Born: March 23, 1865; Portland, Maine, U.S.
- Died: February 14, 1949 (aged 83); Peshtigo, Wisconsin, U.S.
- Resting place: Forest Home Cemetery, Marinette, Marinette County, Wisconsin
- Other name: "Roaring" Dan Seavey
- Occupations: Sailor, fisherman, farmer, saloonkeeper, prospector, U.S. marshal, thief, poacher, smuggler, hijacker, procurer, lake pirate
- Known for: Lake piracy, in Wisconsin and Michigan, on the Great Lakes, from the late 19th to early 20th century

Dan Seavey (March 23, 1865 – February 14, 1949), also known as "Roaring" Dan Seavey, was an American sailor, fisherman, farmer, saloon keeper, prospector, U.S. marshal, thief, poacher, smuggler, hijacker, procurer, and timber pirate in Wisconsin and Michigan and on the Great Lakes in the late 19th to early 20th century.

== Early life ==
Seavey was born in Portland, Maine, on March 23, 1865. He left home at age 13 and became a sailor, serving for a short time in the United States Navy. He moved near Marinette, Wisconsin in the late 1880s, where he married Mary Plumley and had two daughters. The family later moved to Milwaukee, Wisconsin, where Seavey fished, farmed and owned a local saloon. In 1898, Seavey left his family in Milwaukee to participate in the Klondike Gold Rush. He was unsuccessful, and returned to the Great Lakes region around 1900. He briefly returned to Milwaukee, but abandoned his family again and moved to Escanaba, Michigan, where he married a second wife, Zilda Bisner. The two divorced within four years, and Seavey would marry a third wife, Annie Bradley, many years later.

== Piracy ==
In Escanaba, Seavey acquired a schooner, which he named the Wanderer, and began a career as a pirate.

Seavey sailed the Wanderer as a legitimate shipping operation, but also sailed into ports at night to steal cargo from other vessels and warehouses. He was also involved in the illegal prostitution trade, operating aboard a riverboat brothel.

Seavey was notorious for wrecking by altering sea lights, either by extinguishing existing lights or placing false lights. The trick, known as "moon cussing", caused ships to sail into rocks, where Seavey's crew could easily capture the cargo from the damaged vessel.

A significant amount of Seavey's profit was made from venison poaching. When a company called Booth Fisheries attempted to compete with his illegal venison trade, he attacked one of its ships with a cannon, killing everyone on board.

Seavey's most infamous exploit was the hijacking of the schooner Nellie Johnson. On June 11, 1908, he came aboard in Grand Haven, Michigan with a large amount of alcohol, which he offered to share with the crew. Once they became intoxicated, Seavey tossed them overboard and sailed the Nellie Johnson to Chicago, where he attempted to sell the cargo. The United States Revenue Cutter Service soon gave chase in the Tuscarora. Seavey, meanwhile, had moored the Nellie Johnson and was again sailing in the Wanderer. After several days, he was captured on June 29, 1908 and taken to Chicago in irons.

== Arrest ==
Many contemporary newspapers reported that Seavey was arrested on the charge of piracy, but he was officially charged with "unauthorized removal of a vessel on which he had once been a seaman". The original warrant no longer exists, and the piracy charge may have been a fabrication from the Chicago Daily News in a case of yellow journalism. He was released on bond and the charges were later dropped when the owner of the Nellie Johnson failed to appear. For the rest of his life, Seavey maintained that he won the Nellie Johnson in a poker game.

== Later life and death ==
At the end of his career, Seavey accepted a position with the United States Marshals Service, where he worked to curb poaching, smuggling, and piracy on Lake Michigan.

Seavey retired in the late 1920s and settled in Peshtigo, Wisconsin. He died at the Eklund nursing home in Peshtigo on February 14, 1949, at the age of 83. He is buried next to his daughter in Forest Home Cemetery, Marinette, Marinette County, Wisconsin.

== In popular culture ==
Seavey is commemorated in the name of "Roaring Dan's Rum", a maple-flavored rum produced by a Wisconsin distillery.

Seavey and the Wanderer feature in "Pirates of the Great Lakes" (January 7, 2019), episode 10 of season 12 of the Canadian television period drama Murdoch Mysteries. Seavey is played by Canadian actor Hugh Thompson.
