= Ken Huckaby =

American baseball player (born 1971)

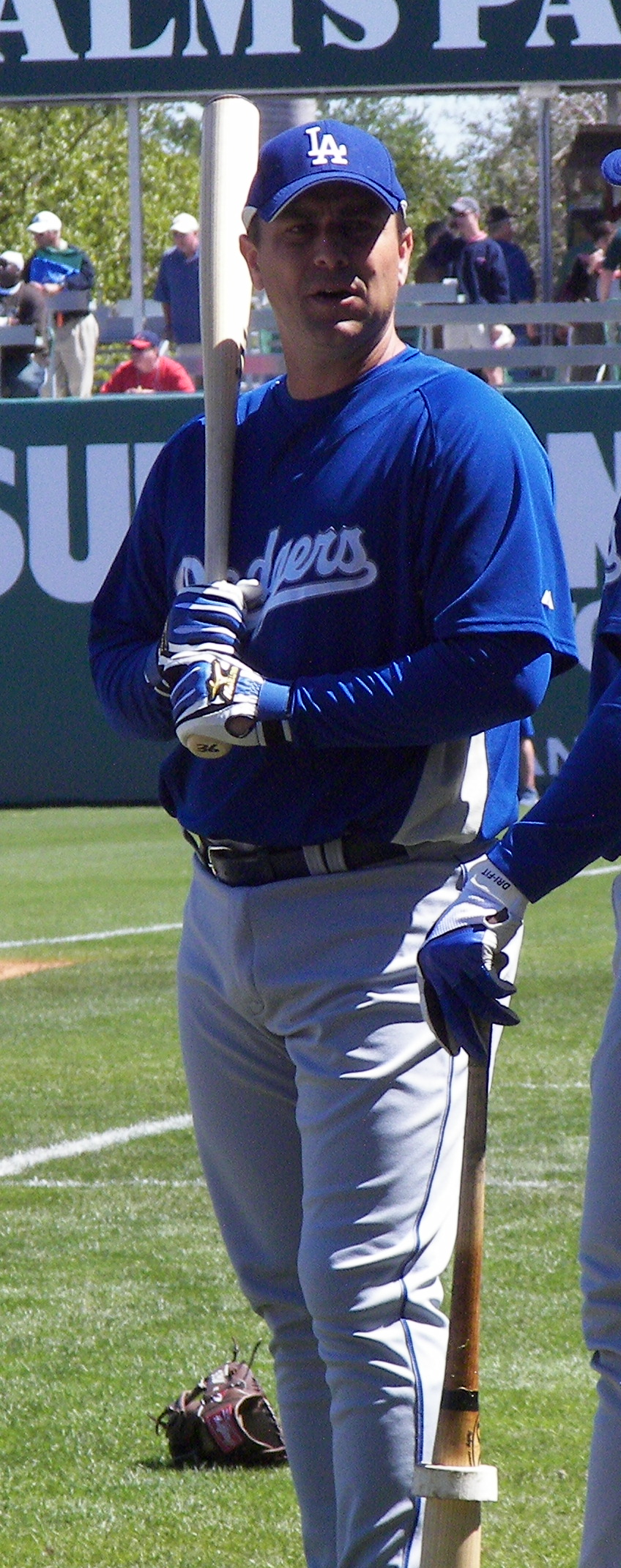
- Huckaby in 2007

Lake Country DockHounds
- Catcher / Manager
- Born: January 27, 1971 (age 55); San Leandro, California, U.S.
- Batted: Right Threw: Right

MLB debut
- October 6, 2001, for the Arizona Diamondbacks

Last MLB appearance
- September 27, 2006, for the Boston Red Sox

MLB statistics
- Batting average: .222
- Home runs: 3
- Runs batted in: 31
- Stats at Baseball Reference

Teams
- Arizona Diamondbacks (2001); Toronto Blue Jays (2002–2003); Texas Rangers (2004); Baltimore Orioles (2004); Texas Rangers (2004); Toronto Blue Jays (2005); Boston Red Sox (2006)
Medals
Men's baseball
Representing United States
Baseball World Cup
Silver medal – second place	2001 Taipei	National team

Kenneth Paul Huckaby (born January 27, 1971) is an American professional baseball coach and former catcher who is currently the manager for the Lake Country DockHounds of the American Association of Professional Baseball. Huckaby attended Manteca High School, and played in Major League Baseball (MLB) for the Arizona Diamondbacks, Toronto Blue Jays, Texas Rangers, Baltimore Orioles, and Boston Red Sox over his 6-year career.

== Playing career ==
=== 2002–2005 ===
A competent defensive replacement with a strong throwing arm, his most productive season came in 2002 with Toronto, when he posted career-highs in batting average (.245), home runs (3), RBI (22) and games (88).

Huckaby became the first catcher in Blue Jays history to hit an inside-the-park home run on July 17, 2002 .

Huckaby was involved in a collision with shortstop Derek Jeter in the 2003 season opener against the New York Yankees. With Jeter on first base and Jason Giambi at bat, Toronto used an extreme shift that left third base uncovered. Giambi hit a soft grounder to the pitcher, Roy Halladay, who threw to first baseman Carlos Delgado for an out. Jeter, seeing Toronto out of position, rounded second and ran to third. Huckaby ran up the line to cover third and fielded Delgado's throw. Jeter dove headfirst into the bag, while Huckaby attempted to catch the baseball and block Jeter from reaching third. In doing so, Huckaby fell onto Jeter; his shin guard driving into Jeter's shoulder.

=== 2006 ===
In the 2006 spring training, Huckaby had an opportunity of being the backup catcher for the Red Sox. Then, he injured his left knee during the first exhibition game and lost the job to Josh Bard, who was later sent to San Diego for Doug Mirabelli. On August 1, Huckaby was added to the 25-man roster to serve as Mirabelli's backup while Boston's regular catcher Jason Varitek recuperated from an ailing left knee. Before the call, he appeared in 68 games for Triple-A Pawtucket, hitting .207 with two home runs and 16 RBI. Huckaby's backup role was once again brought into question with Boston's acquisition of Javy López on August 3. That night, Huckaby went 1 for 3 with an RBI. However, the very next day, August 4, Huckaby was designated for assignment. He later cleared waivers and returned to Pawtucket.

=== 2007 ===
Prior to the 2007 season, Huckaby was invited to attend spring training with the Los Angeles Dodgers and was assigned to Triple-A at the end of spring, where he spent the entire season playing for the Las Vegas 51s.

=== 2008 ===
In January 2008, Huckaby signed a minor league contract with the Kansas City Royals. Huckaby was released by the Royals on May 10, 2008.

== Coaching career ==
After spending the 2013 season as the hitting coach with the Bluefield Blue Jays, Toronto's Rookie League Affiliate, Huckaby served as the hitting coach in 2014 for Class-A Lansing Lugnuts. In 2015, he got his first managing job taking over from John Tamargo Jr. as the Lugnuts manager. After taking the Lugnuts to the Eastern Division Championship Series he moved up to Class A-Advanced to manage the Dunedin Blue Jays for the 2016 season.

In 2017 he was elevated to the role of Catching Coordinator for all of Toronto's minor league affiliates.

On November 13, 2019, Huckaby was named manager of the Triple-A Buffalo Bisons for the 2020 season, replacing Bobby Meacham. He was terminated by the Blue Jays on September 24, 2020 without having managed a single game in Buffalo (Minor league season cancelled and worked with players at the Rochester facility)

In 2023, Huckaby took over as manager of the partner league Lake Country DockHounds when Jim Bennett abruptly quit nine games into the season. The DockHounds removed the interim label for the 2024 season.
