= Curtis Terry (baseball) =

American baseball player (born 1996)

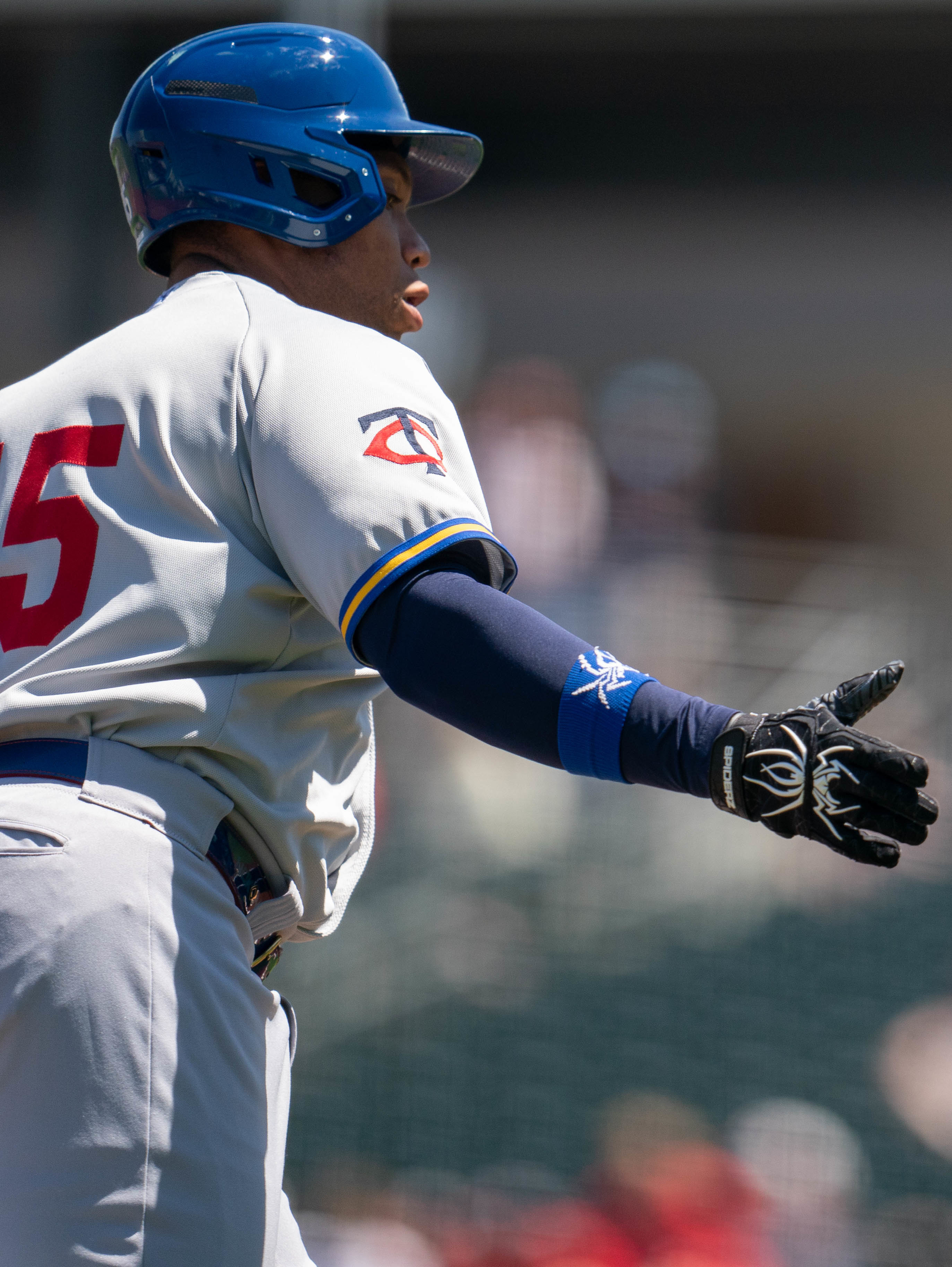
- Terry with the St. Paul Saints in 2022

Lexington Legends – No. 28
- First baseman
- Born: October 6, 1996 (age 29); Snellville, Georgia, U.S.
- Bats: Right Throws: Right

MLB debut
- July 23, 2021, for the Texas Rangers

MLB statistics (through 2021 season)
- Batting average: .089
- Home runs: 0
- Runs batted in: 1
- Stats at Baseball Reference

Teams
- Texas Rangers (2021)

Curtis Marquis Terry (born October 6, 1996) is an American professional baseball first baseman for the Lexington Legends of the Atlantic League of Professional Baseball. He has previously played in Major League Baseball (MLB) for the Texas Rangers.

== Amateur career ==
Terry attended Archer High School in Lawrenceville, Georgia. He committed to play college baseball at Georgia State University. He was drafted by the Texas Rangers in the 13th round of the 2015 MLB draft. He signed with Texas for a $100,000 signing bonus.

== Professional career ==
=== Texas Rangers ===
Terry spent his debut season of 2015 with the AZL Rangers of the Rookie-level Arizona League, hitting .260/.317/.394/.710 with 1 home run and 24 RBI. He split the 2016 season between the AZL Rangers and the Spokane Indians of the Class A Short Season Northwest League, hitting a combined .285/.333/.488/.822 with 5 home runs and 26 RBI. Terry spent the 2017 and 2018 seasons back with Spokane. He hit .258/.303/.467/.771 with 12 home runs and 30 RBI in 2017, and .337/.434/.606/1.040 with 15 home runs and 60 RBI in 2018. Terry was named the 2018 Northwest League MVP.

Terry made his full-season debut in 2019, spitting the season between the Hickory Crawdads of the Class A South Atlantic League and the Down East Wood Ducks of the Class A-Advanced Carolina League. He combined to hit .293/.362/.537/.899 with 25 home runs and 80 RBI between the two levels. He was named the Rangers 2019 minor league player of the year. Terry did not play in 2020 due to the cancellation of the Minor League Baseball season because of the COVID-19 pandemic. He was assigned to the Round Rock Express of the Triple-A West for the 2021 minor league season, hitting .275/.349/.533/.882 with 22 home runs and 75 RBI. Terry hit for the cycle with Round Rock on June 18, 2021. On July 23, 2021, Terry's contract was selected and he was promoted to the major leagues for the first time. He made his MLB debut that night, as the designated hitter against the Houston Astros. After starting his career 0–20, Terry recorded his first career hit on August 2, a double off Chris Rodriguez. Terry hit just .089 with 1 RBI over 48 plate appearances for Texas in 2021. On November 5, 2021, Terry was outrighted off the roster and became a free agent.

=== Minnesota Twins ===
On November 30, 2021, Terry signed a minor league contract with the Minnesota Twins. Terry played in 80 games for the Triple-A St. Paul Saints, slashing .250/.348/.429 with 10 home runs and 32 RBI. He was released on August 10, 2022.

=== Gastonia Honey Hunters ===
On January 27, 2023, Terry signed a minor league contract with the Baltimore Orioles organization. Terry was released by the Orioles organization on March 26.

On April 15, 2023, Terry signed with the Gastonia Honey Hunters of the Atlantic League of Professional Baseball. In 61 games for Gastonia, Terry batted .228/.315/.415 with 9 home runs and 29 RBI.

=== Lake Country DockHounds ===
On July 12, 2023, Terry was traded alongside David Richardson and Steven Sensley to the Lake Country DockHounds of the American Association of Professional Baseball in exchange for three players to be named later. In 43 games for the DockHounds, he batted .225/.320/.583 with 16 home runs and 36 RBI. Terry became a free agent at the end of the 2023 season.

=== Hagerstown Flying Boxcars ===
On April 22, 2024, Terry signed with the Hagerstown Flying Boxcars of the Atlantic League of Professional Baseball. In 48 games for the Flying Boxcars, he batted .217/.296/.349 with five home runs and 23 RBI. Terry was released by Hagerstown on June 26.

=== Lake Country DockHounds (second stint) ===
On June 28, 2024, Terry signed with the Lake Country DockHounds of the American Association of Professional Baseball. In 56 games for Lake Country, he slashed .352/.399/.639 with 16 home runs and 51 RBI. He became a free agent following the season.

=== Lexington Legends ===
On February 10, 2025, Terry signed with the Lexington Legends of the Atlantic League of Professional Baseball. In 112 appearances for Lexington, slashing .309/.394/.555 with 25 home runs, 97 RBI, and four stolen bases.
