= Timber pirate =

Term for pirates engaged in illegal logging

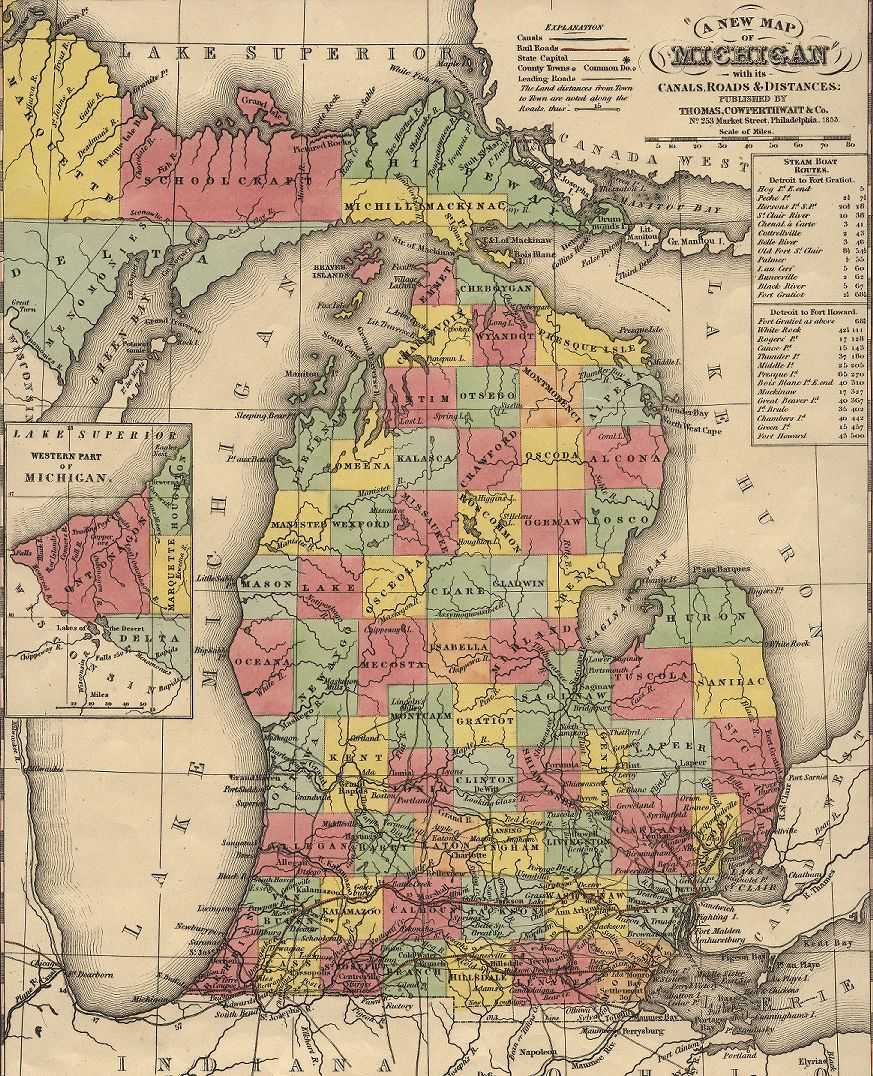
An 1853 map of the U.S. state of Michigan, where timber pirates devastated United States Navy lumber reserves along the Michigan coast.

In the United States, a timber pirate is a pirate engaged in the illegal logging industry.

== History ==
The term probably originated during the Timber Rebellion in 1853, when criminals mainly from the western Great Lakes region preyed on Michigan's government-owned supplies of lumber. When the government responded by confiscating loads of wood their owners and the so-called timber pirates revolted. The pirates assembled and burned a group of boats loaded with the stolen wood in the most serious incident of the conflict. Following that a series of naval operations by the United States Navy warship USS Michigan led to the capture of many rebels and successfully put an end to the revolt.

Timber pirates continued to thrive in the Great Lakes for several years afterward though and at the same time river pirates began operating on the upper Mississippi River and its tributaries. The American navy also launched another separate operation against timber pirates on the Calcasieu River of Louisiana. In the early 20th century, those who engaged in New Mexico's illegal logging industry were called timber pirates.

== See also ==
- River pirate
