= John C. Carter (U.S. naval officer) =

19th-century American naval officer

- Born: c. 1805; Virginia, U.S.
- Died: November 24, 1870 (aged 65); Brooklyn, New York City, U.S.
- Relatives: Charles Carter (grandfather)
- Military career
- Allegiance: United States of America
- Branch: United States Navy
- Service years: 1825-1867
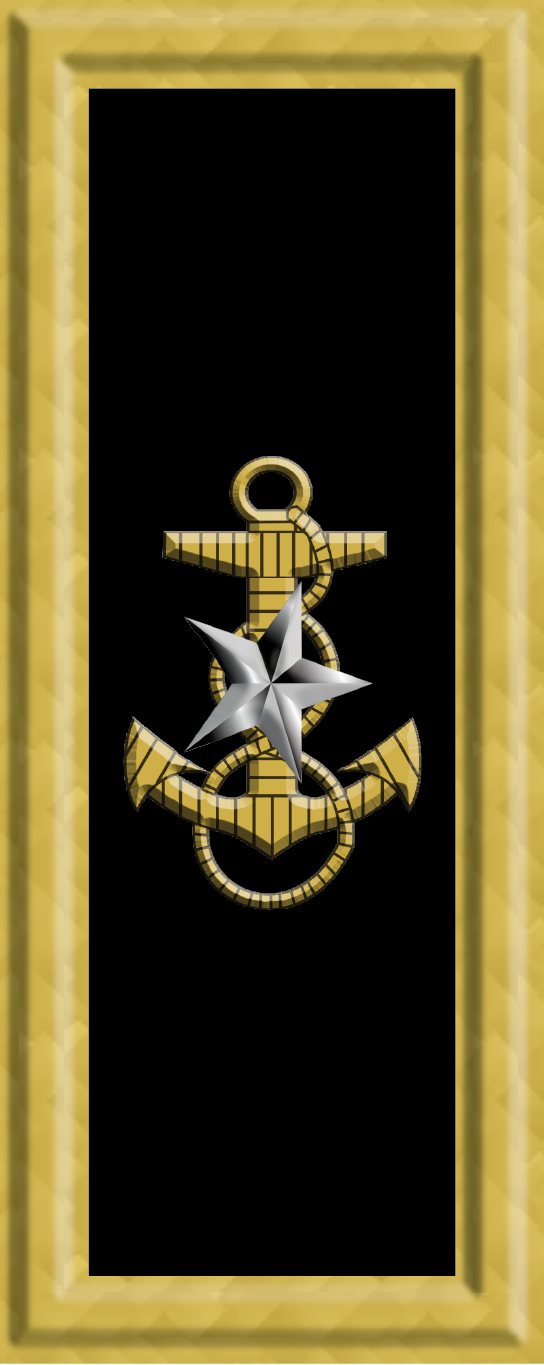
- Rank: Commodore
- Conflicts: Mexican-American War; American Civil War

John C. Carter (c. 1805 – November 24, 1870) was a Virginia-born career U.S. Navy officer whose service during the Mexican-American War and later during the American Civil War ended with his retirement in 1870 at the rank of Commodore.

== Early and family life ==
Born in Virginia to the former Sarah Champe Stanard (1741–1814) and her husband (and distant cousin) Walker Carter (1772-d. after 1820 and before 1830), he could trace his ancestry to the First Families of Virginia. However, his grandfather Charles Carter (1732–1796), a patriot during the American Revolutionary War (and member of the House of Burgesses and the Virginia House of Delegates), dissipated the wealth inherited from his paternal grandfather Robert Carter I.

His father Walker Carter owned 9 slaves in Spotsylvania County in 1810 After serving in the War of 1812, he moved his family to Louisville in Jefferson County, Kentucky, where he prospered and owned two properties by 1820. At one of those, he owned no slaves, but his other location in the 1820 census shows him as owning 12 slaves (3 males and 9 females), and his family also included 8 white males between 16 and 26 and 14 white men between 26 and 45 (hence a likely manufacturing or steamboat operation). Although several brothers and sisters died as infants or without issue, his sister Virginia married David Smith Benedict of Louisville. Both his younger brothers who had children married women from Fredericksburg, and survived the Civil War and are buried in St. Louis, Missouri. Frank Carter (1813–1896) was a steamboat captain who transported mail, freight and passengers on the Ohio River and was buried in Louisville's historic Cave Hill Cemetery like his father. The children of Capt. Walker Randolph Carter Jr. (1807–1889) included CSA Major Frank Carter (b.1838) who enlisted as a student at the University of Virginia, survived the conflict, and after the war became a respected St. Louis businessman, and was buried like his father in historic Bellefontaine Cemetery in St. Louis.

Commander Carter married Elizabeth S. Phelps and they had a son, Charles Edward Carter and Rebecca (who married U.S. Army Col. Crawford).

== Career ==
Carter received a naval appointment as a Kentucky resident on March 1, 1825. As a midshipman he served on the sloop 'Lexington' in 1827, then on the frigate 'Delaware' in the Mediterranean squadron in 1829–30. He was commissioned as a lieutenant on February 9, 1837. During the Mexican-American War Carter served on the steamer 'Mississippi' of the home squadron. On September 14, 1855, he was promoted to the rank of Commander. In 1862, Commander Carter led the first iron-hulled steamer on the Great Lakes, the USS Michigan, which was the object of Confederate subversion, but its officers remained loyal to the Union.

Following the war, Carter commanded the receiving ship 'Vermont' and was based at San Francisco. On April 4, 1867, he was commissioned as a Commodore and placed on the retired list.

== Death and legacy ==
Commodore Carter died in Brooklyn, New York on November 24, 1870.
