= USS Michigan (1843) =

United States Navy's first iron-hulled warship

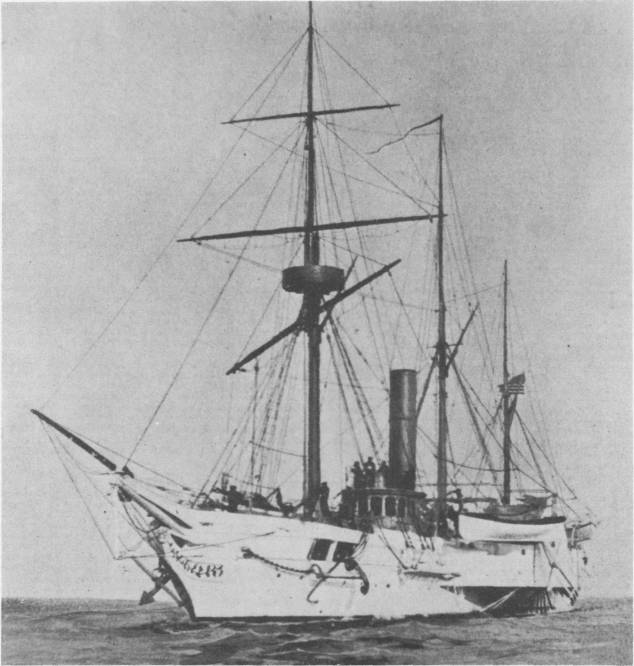
- USS Michigan, seen here after her name was changed to USS Wolverine in 1905.

History

United States
- Name: Michigan
- Ordered: 19 May 1839
- Builder: Stackhouse and Tomlinson
- Laid down: 1839
- Launched: 5 December 1840
- Commissioned: 29 September 1844
- Decommissioned: 6 May 1912
- Renamed: Wolverine on 17 June 1905
- Stricken: c. 12 August 1923
- Fate: Scrapped in 1949

General characteristics
- Tonnage: 685
- Length: 163 ft (50 m)
- Beam: 27 ft (8.2 m)
- Draft: 9 ft (2.7 m)
- Propulsion: 2 × 330 ihp (250 kW) steam engines
- Speed: 10.5 kn (12.1 mph; 19.4 km/h)
- Capacity: 115 tons of coal
- Complement: 88 officers and men
- Armament: As Michigan: Original: 1 × 18-pounder; American Civil War: 1 × 30-pounder Parrott rifle, 5 × 20-pounder Parrott rifles, 6 × 24-pounder smoothbores, 2 × 12-pounder boat howitzers; As Wolverine: 6 × 3-pounders (47 mm (1.9 in))
- Notes: Great Lakes Patrol; Timber Rebellion; Buffalo Incident; Beaver-Macinack War; James Strang Assassination; American Civil War; Philo Parsons Affair; Fenian Raids; Niagara Raid

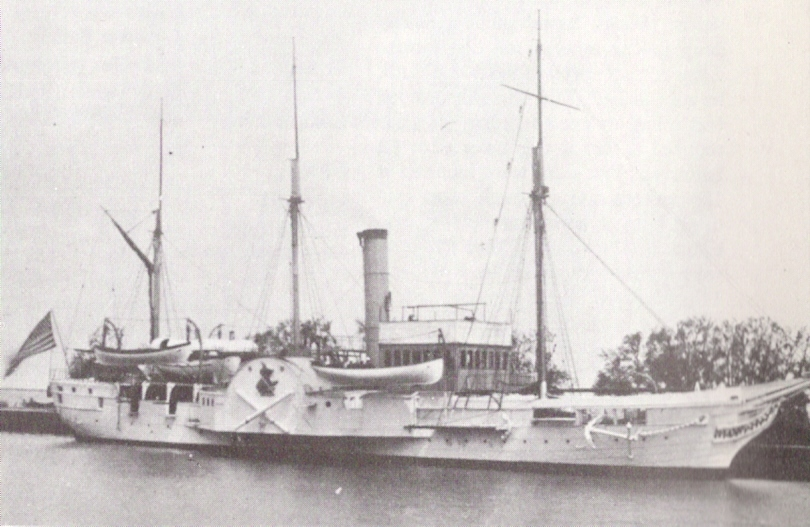
USS Wolverine in a Great Lakes port in the early 1900s

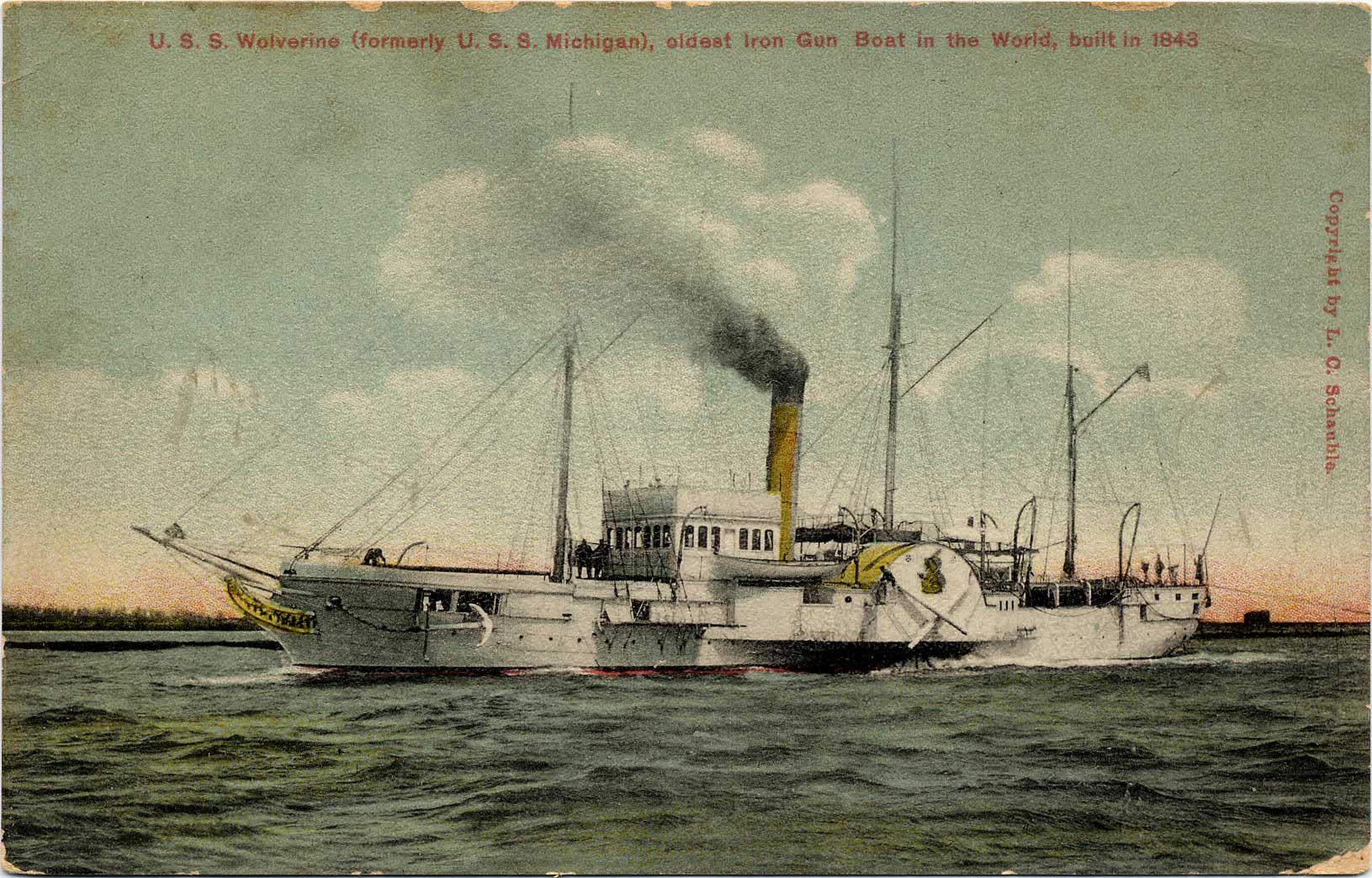
USS Wolverine (IX-31)

USS Michigan was the United States Navy's first iron-hulled warship and served during the American Civil War. She was renamed USS Wolverine in 1905.

== Construction and design ==
Michigan, a sidewheel steamer, was built in response to British authorities arming two steamers during the Rebellions of 1837–1838 in Canada. Secretary of the Navy Abel P. Upshur selected an iron hull partly as a test of practicability of using such a "cheap and indestructible a material" for ships. The ship was designed by Samuel Hartt, and fabricated in parts at Pittsburgh in the last half of 1842, transported overland and assembled at Erie. The launch on 5 December 1843 was unsuccessful with the ship sticking after moving some 50 feet (15 m) down the ways and efforts to complete the launch ended by nightfall. On returning in the morning Hartt found Michigan had "launched herself in the night" and was floating offshore in Lake Erie.

By 1908 the ship was noted in the journal The American Marine Engineer as being the oldest metal-hulled vessel then existing and of interest to engineers because of the ship's age. The two engines were inclined simple steam engines of 36 inches (91 cm) with a 96-inch (244 cm) stroke that were original and running well in 1908. The first of three sets of boilers were return flue type that lasted fifty years before finally being replaced by bricked in return tube types. The operating pressure was low, 25 psi (170 kPa), sufficient to drive the engines at 20 rpm, with engine room piping of .125-inch-thick (0.32 cm) copper connecting with brass flange joints. When, about 1905, the ship finally changed from kerosene lights to electric, a special engine for the dynamo had to be constructed to operate on the low pressure steam. The steam was also used in a peculiar system for repelling boarders with hot water direct from the boiler. Coal consumption before the latest modifications was two tons per hour and after the modifications was as low as one half ton per hour. The ship carried two steam launches. The ship had never made even ten knots until dispatched from the harbor at Cleveland to Buffalo to prevent riots on the assassination of President William McKinley 6 September 1901 and, with the safeties weighted, she made almost fourteen knots at 30 rpm at one point.

== Early career ==
Michigan commissioned 29 September 1844 under the command of Commander William Inman and operated on the Great Lakes out of Erie, Pennsylvania, throughout her career. In May 1851, she assisted in the arrest of Mr. James Jesse Strang, known as "King James I", who headed a dissident Mormon colony on Beaver Island at the head of Lake Michigan, some 37 mi (60 km) from the Straits of Mackinac. Strang was soon freed, but was assassinated by two of his followers on 19 June 1856. The assassins fled to Michigan for sanctuary and were taken to Mackinac and released.

In an encounter with Great Lakes "timber pirates" in the 1850s, a steamer rammed Michigan. The pirate vessel was badly damaged in the maneuver, and was captured.

Michigan was the first iron-hulled ship in the US Navy.

== American Civil War ==
During the American Civil War, Michigan was armed with a 30-pounder Parrott rifle, five 20-pounder Parrott rifles, six 24-pounder smoothbores, and two 12-pounder boat howitzers. The Confederate States of America considered launching attacks against the North from the Province of Canada. Early in 1863, Lieutenant William Henry Murdaugh, CSN, planned to lead a group of Confederate naval officers to Canada where they would purchase a small steamer, man her with Canadians and steam to Erie to board Michigan and use her against locks and shipping on the Great Lakes. However, Confederate President Jefferson Davis did not approve the plan.

Michigan cruised on the Great Lakes during most of the war providing an element of stability and security. On 28 July 1863, a short time after New York City had been seriously shaken by riots, its Virginia-born Commander John C. Carter reported from Detroit, "I found the people suffering under serious apprehensions of a riot....The presence of the ships perhaps did something toward overawing the refractory, and certainly did much to allay the apprehensions of the excited, doubting people." During August 1863, Michigan was called on for similar service in Buffalo, New York.

During 1864, rumors of Confederate conspiracies in Canada were heard again. In March, Secretary of the Navy Gideon Welles ordered Michigan to be "prepared for active service as soon as the ice will permit." In the autumn, the Confederates finally struck. Led by Acting Master John Yates Beall, 20 Confederates embarked on the steamer Philo Parsons as passengers and soon seized her. They next captured and burned the steamer Island Queen. Meanwhile, Captain Charles H. Cole, CSA, a Confederate agent in the Lake Erie region, was attempting to gain the trust of Michigan's officers as the Michigan lay off Johnson's Island helping to guard Confederate prisoners. However, Commander Carter discovered Cole's duplicity and had him arrested before Beall reached Johnson's Island on Philo Parsons. When the prearranged signals from shore were not made, Beall reluctantly abandoned his plan and retired to Sandwich (now Windsor, Ontario) where he stripped and burned Philo Parsons.

== Later U.S. Navy service ==
After the Civil War, Michigan remained in U.S. Navy service, and was the ship which intercepted and interned the army of the Fenian Brotherhood as it returned from its invasion of Canada near Buffalo in 1866. On 16 July 1902 she was rammed at dock in Erie, Pennsylvania, by ore carrier Maurice B. Grover moving at full steam, striking Michigan's bow a glancing blow, then driving between Michigan and the dock carrying away the hawsers. Michigan was then shoved 200 yd (180 m) down the harbor. Michigan had her bowsprit, forecastle and forward bulkhead wrecked and she was scraped along the entire port side. The six pound Driggs-Schroeder rifles of the rear port battery were bent out of true and a boat on the port davits was demolished. The damage was between $10,000 and $15,000. Michigan was renamed USS Wolverine on 17 June 1905 to free up the name Michigan for use by the new battleship USS Michigan (BB-27).

Wolverine was decommissioned on 6 May 1912.

== Pennsylvania Naval Militia service ==
Wolverine was turned over to the Pennsylvania Naval Militia, which she served for 11 years, making training cruises in the summer for the United States Naval Reserve. For the 1913 centennial of the War of 1812 Battle of Lake Erie, Wolverine towed the brig USS Niagara from port to port as part of the celebrations. In mid-1920, when the U.S. Navy adopted its modern alphanumeric hull number system, she was classified as a "miscellaneous auxiliary" and designated IX-31. On 12 August 1923, a connecting rod of Wolverine's port cylinder broke, ending her active career.

== Relic ==
In 1927, Wolverine's hulk was pushed up onto a sandbank in Misery Bay on the Presque Isle State Park Peninsula and loaned to the city of Erie, Pennsylvania, as a relic. She was sold to the Foundation for the Preservation of the Original USS Michigan, Inc., on 19 July 1948. But when fund-raising efforts failed to acquire sufficient money for her restoration and preservation, she was cut up and sold for scrap in 1949 to the Ace Junk & Salvage Company. Sam Tanenbaum, proprietor, donated the prow back to the city of Erie.

In 1950, Wolverine's prow was erected as a monument in Wolverine Park in Erie, near the shipyard where she had been built. On 22 February 1998, the prow was moved to the Erie Maritime Museum for restoration. Today it can be viewed inside the museum.

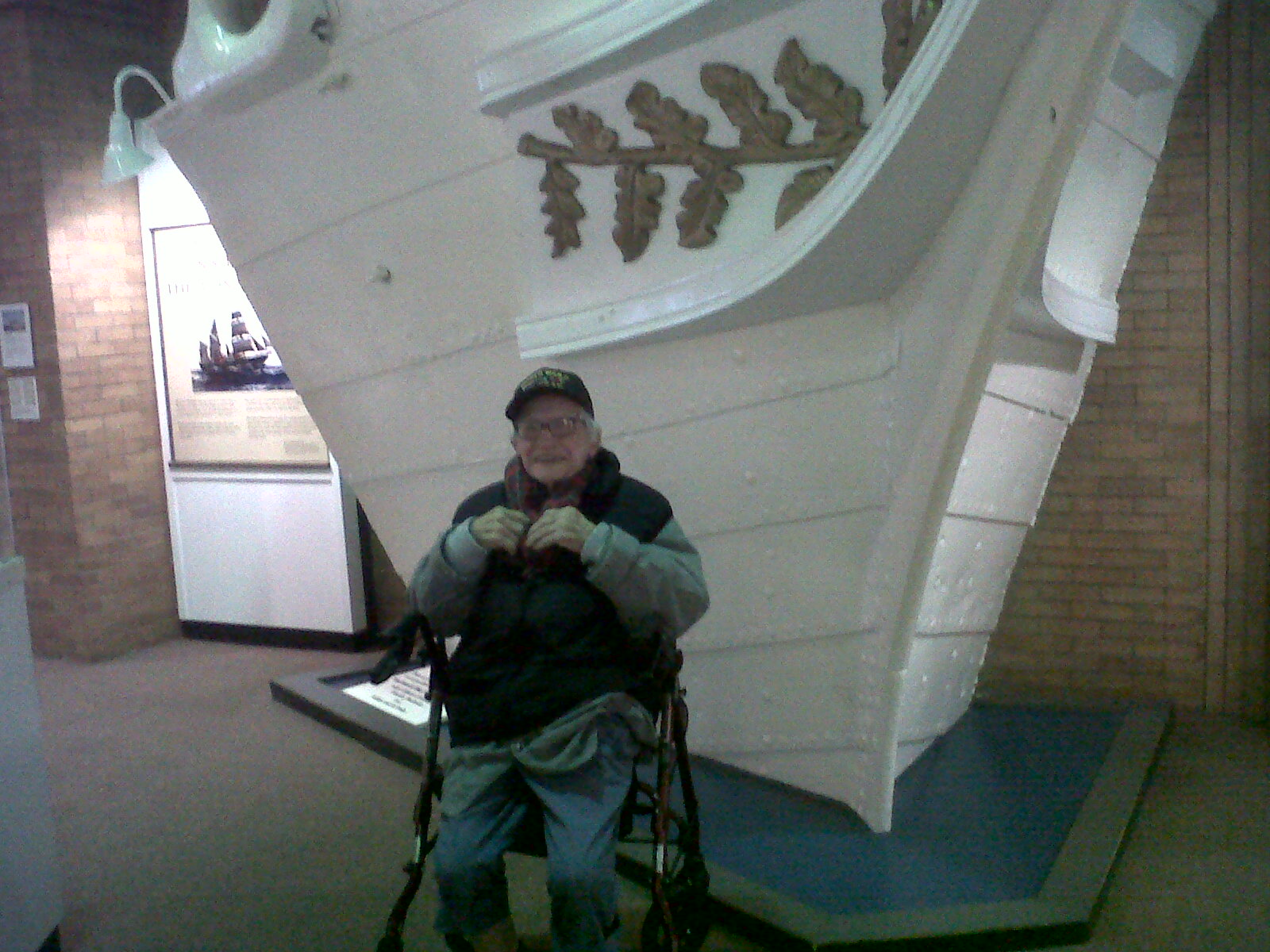
Sam Tanenbaum in December 2013 at age 93 sitting next to the prow of the USS Wolverine which he donated to the city of Erie, Pennsylvania, in 1949

== Bibliography ==
- Grobmeier, Alvin H. (1990). "Question 2/89". Warship International. XXVII (2): 198–199. ISSN 0043-0374.
- Naval History And Heritage Command. "Michigan". Dictionary of American Naval Fighting Ships. Naval History And Heritage Command.
- Naval History And Heritage Command. "Wolverine". Dictionary of American Naval Fighting Ships. Naval History And Heritage Command.
- Taylor, Michael J.H. (1990). Jane's Fighting Ships of World War I. Studio. ISBN 1-85170-378-0.
- Wilson, L. F. (1908). "The Oldest Iron Vessel in the World". The American Marine Engineer. 3 (October, 1908). New York/Chicago: National Marine Engineer's Beneficial Association.
