= USRC Ingham =

USCGC Ingham may refer to the following cutters of the United States Revenue Cutter Service:

- USRC Ingham (1832), a Morris-Taney-class schooner which served from 1832 to 1836
- USRC Ingham (1849), a Harrison-class schooner which served from 1849 to 1856

== See also ==
- USCGC Ingham, ships of the same name which served with the United States Coast Guard
