= José Devers =

Dominican baseball player (born 1999)

Free agent
- Second baseman / Shortstop
- Born: December 7, 1999 (age 26); Samaná, Dominican Republic
- Bats: Left Throws: Right

MLB debut
- April 24, 2021, for the Miami Marlins

MLB statistics (through 2024 season)
- Batting average: .244
- Home runs: 0
- Runs batted in: 5
- Stats at Baseball Reference

Teams
- Miami Marlins (2021, 2024)

José Rodolfo Devers (born December 7, 1999) is a Dominican professional baseball shortstop who is a free agent. He has previously played in Major League Baseball (MLB) for the Miami Marlins, with whom he made his MLB debut in 2021.

== Career ==
=== New York Yankees ===
Devers was signed as an international free agent by the New York Yankees on July 2, 2016. He made his professional debut in 2017, playing for both the Dominican Summer League Yankees and the Gulf Coast League Yankees, posting a combined .245 batting average with one home run, 16 RBI and 16 stolen bases in 53 games between both teams.

=== Miami Marlins ===
On December 11, 2017, Devers was traded to the Miami Marlins (along with Starlin Castro and Jorge Guzmán) in exchange for outfielder Giancarlo Stanton and cash considerations. He spent 2018 with the Greensboro Grasshoppers, batting .273 with 24 RBI in 85 games. He also played in two games for the Jupiter Hammerheads during the season. Devers returned to Jupiter to begin 2019, but missed time due to injury; over 33 games, he batted .325. He was selected to play in the Arizona Fall League for the Salt River Rafters following the season.

On November 20, 2020, Devers was added to the 40-man roster. On April 22, 2021, Devers was promoted to the major leagues for the first time. He made his MLB debut on April 24 against the San Francisco Giants as the starting second baseman. In 21 games during his rookie campaign, Devers batted .244/.304/.317 with no home runs and five RBI. On June 14, Devers was placed on the injured list with a right shoulder impingement. He was transferred to the 60-day injured list on July 20. On August 11, Devers underwent season-ending surgery to repair a labrum tear in his right shoulder.

Devers did not appear for the Marlins in 2022, instead spending the year with two of Miami's minor league affiliates. On November 15, 2022, Devers was designated for assignment by the Marlins. Devers cleared waivers and was sent outright to the Triple–A Jacksonville Jumbo Shrimp on November 20. He spent the entirety of the 2023 season with the Double–A Pensacola Blue Wahoos, playing in 96 games and batting .276/.352/.421 with seven home runs, 46 RBI, and five stolen bases.

Devers began the 2024 campaign with Jacksonville, slashing .239/.304/.362 with three home runs and 17 RBI over 54 games. On August 31, 2024, the Marlins selected Devers' contract, adding him to their active roster. In 3 games for Miami, he went 1–for–4. Devers was designated for assignment by the Marlins on September 19. He cleared waivers and was sent outright to Jacksonville on September 21. Devers elected free agency on October 1.

=== Atlanta Braves ===
On November 29, 2024, Devers signed a minor league contract with the Atlanta Braves. He began the 2025 season with the Triple-A Gwinnett Stripers, slashing .286/.345/.398 with two home runs and 17 RBI in 29 games. Devers was released by the Braves organization on July 26, 2025.

== Personal life ==
Devers' cousin, Rafael Devers, has played in MLB for the Boston Red Sox, and as of 2025 plays for the San Francisco Giants.
