= Lake Country DockHounds =

Baseball team in Oconomowoc, Wisconsin

Logo	Cap insignia

Information
- League: American Association of Professional Baseball (East Division)
- Location: Oconomowoc, Wisconsin
- Ballpark: Wisconsin Brewing Company Park
- Founded: 2021
- Colors: Royal blue, sky blue, white
- Mascot: Louie B. Sluggin
- Ownership: Blue Ribbon Baseball LLC
- General manager: Trish Rasberry
- Manager: Ken Huckaby
- Media: AA Baseball TV
- Website: dockhounds.com

The Lake Country DockHounds are a professional baseball team that is based in Oconomowoc, Wisconsin. The DockHounds currently play in the American Association of Professional Baseball, an official Partner League of Major League Baseball. Lake Country played their first season in 2022, as they became the first professional sports team in Waukesha County.

== History ==
After years of research and developmental ideas, on March 3, 2020, Blue Ribbon Baseball, LLC finally received approval from the City of Oconomowoc. The DockHounds were granted permission to build a stadium and training facility in the Pabst Farms development. Prior to its access, the DockHounds proposed two different Waukesha County locations in Pewaukee, Wisconsin and Waukesha, Wisconsin. The Pewaukee proposal was opposed and later scrapped as the Waukesha location didn't produce enough funding, thus the DockHounds settled on Oconomowoc.

The DockHounds were originally set to join the Northwoods League in 2021. However, due to the COVID-19 pandemic, the construction of their stadium and their inaugural season was postponed. The delay gave the team time to research their options for leagues to join. The DockHounds later joined the American Association after the league saw the departure of the St. Paul Saints to join Minor League Baseball and become the Triple-A affiliate of the Minnesota Twins. The league also saw the folding of the Texas AirHogs. After the Kane County Cougars joined the league, the association sought a permanent 12th member. The Blue Ribbon Baseball, LLC was awarded the final spot in the league on May 17, 2021.

The DockHounds' name was unveiled on June 10, 2021 as the result of a name-the-team contest that netted over 2,700 entries. Other finalists included the Kraken, Bobbers, Hoppers and Paddlers. The name references the prevalence of dogs on docks and boats during the summer in the region.

== Ownership ==
The DockHounds are owned by Tom and Lisa Kelenic (parents of MLB outfielder Jarred Kelenic). The DockHounds management team also includes Sonny Bando (son of Sal Bando, a former general Manager of the Milwaukee Brewers and MLB All-star), general manager Trish Rasberry, director of marketing Bryan Giese, and director of sales and Justin Hunt.

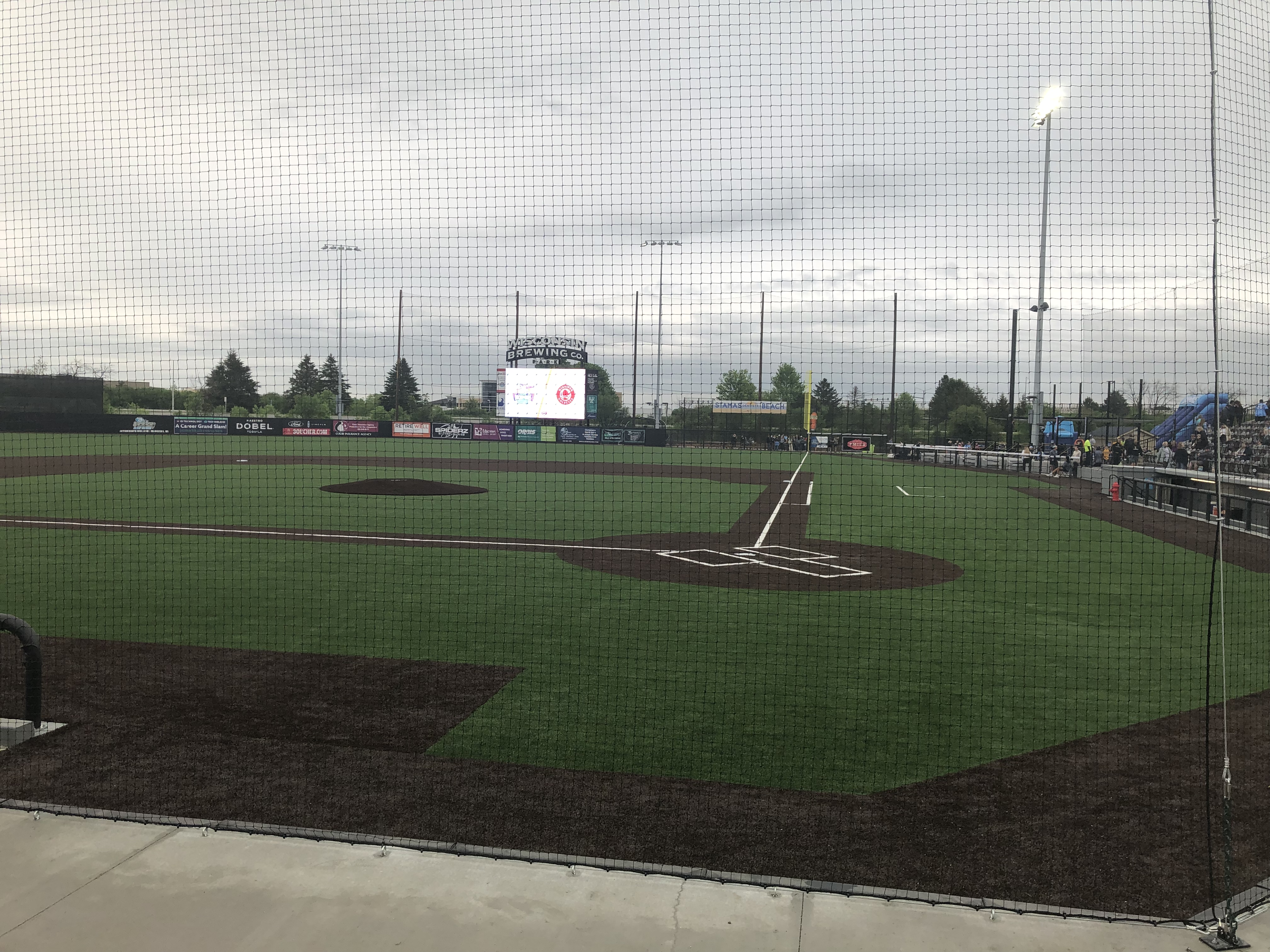
Wisconsin Brewing Company Park, the home of the Lake Country DockHounds.

== Stadium ==
Partnering with the Wisconsin Brewing Company, a craft brewing company based in Verona, Wisconsin, ground was broken for the DockHounds' home stadium June 29, 2021. The facility's name, Wisconsin Brewing Company Park, and the team's logo were also unveiled.

== Past seasons ==
On August 10, 2021, The DockHounds announced Jim Bennett as their manager, Dave Nilsson as bench/hitting coach, and Paul Wagner as their pitching coach.

On May 13, 2022, the DockHounds began their inaugural season on the road in Franklin, Wisconsin, against the Milwaukee Milkmen. The DockHounds took an 8-4 loss before they secured their first organizational win two days later. The franchise then opened Wisconsin Brewing Company Park to a sold out crowd of 3,999, on May 20, 2022, with an 8–5 win over the Winnipeg Goldeyes.

The DockHounds began the 2023 season with Jim Bennett at the helm, however after a 2-6 start to the season, the team parted ways with Bennett. Ken Huckaby was selected to replace Bennett as manager, and retained only the pitching coach, Paul Wagner, from the old staff. The DockHounds finished its inaugural season in a tie with the Cleburne Railroaders for the last playoff spot. However, the DockHounds missed the playoffs due to several tiebreakers that yielded toward the Railroaders. The DockHounds made the 2024 playoffs in their third season only to lose in two games to the Kane County Cougars.

During the 2024 season, the DockHounds showed their organization was about more than just baseball, rather helping a community. The DockHounds helped save a man after falling from his bicycle. Three members of the organization Demetrius Sims, Dominic Stearn and Marek Chlup helped save the man's life.

== Rebrand ==
The DockHounds introduced a weekend-themed rebranding to commemorate the movie "The Wizard of Oz." The DockHounds rebranded to the "Flying Monkeys" for the June 14-16 home series against the Railroaders. The Flying Monkeys weekend offered special team memorabilia, special jerseys and stadium theming.

== Mascot and On-Field Host ==
The DockHounds mascot is Louie B. Sluggin, an anthropomorphic retriever and a bucket hat. The on-field Host for the Dockhounds is "Skipper Dave." Both Louie and Skipper Dave wear the number 5 on their Jerseys. The #5 represents the number of times the letter o appears in Oconomowoc. Through the first four seasons of the Dockhounds existence, Skipper Dave and Louie have entertained fans at every home game.

== Season-by-season record ==
Lake Country DockHounds season records
Season	League	Division	Regular Season				Postseason			Manager	Ref
Season	League	Division	Record	Win %	League	GB	Record	Win%	Result	Manager	Ref
2022	American Association	East	36–64	.360	AA	18.0	-	-	-	Jim Bennett	
2023	American Association	East	46-54	.460	AA	10.0	-	-	-	Jim Bennett (3-6); Ken Huckaby (43-48)	
2024	American Association	East	53-47	.530	AA	7.0	0-2	.000	Lost East Division series 2–0 Vs Kane County Cougars	Ken Huckaby	

== Roster ==
Lake Country DockHounds roster
Active roster	Coaching staff
Pitchers: 6 Eric Torres; 8 JT Moeller; 9 Kelvan Pilot; 15 Brett Conine; 18 Beau Philip; 21 Jake Cantleberry; 22 Connor Fenlong; 23 Luke Hansel; 24 Chris Jefferson; 26 Trey Riley; 30 Will Sandy; 33 Jacob Nix; 56 Jack Washburn; 80 Bryce Bonnin; Catchers: 25 Luke Roskam; 59 Hayden Dunhurst; Infielders: 1 Demetrius Sims; 2 Nick Northcut; 4 Luis Aviles Jr.; 11 Aaron Hill; 27 Daunte Stuart; 29 Ryan Hernandez; Outfielders: 7 Ray Zuberer III; 13 Brian Rey; 38 Chavez Young; 70 Eddy Pelc	Manager: -- Ken Huckaby; Coaches: Kaela Johnson (trainer); -- Dave Pano (hitting); -- Paul Wagner (pitching); Disabled list; ‡ Inactive list; § Suspended list; Roster updated May 31, 2025 Transactions

== Notable alumni ==
- Efraín Contreras (2022)
- Dai-Kang Yang (2022)
- Alex McRae (2022–2023)
- Evan Kruczynski (2022–2023)
- Mike Shawaryn (2023)
- Ryan Hartman (2023)
- Randall Delgado (2023)
- Jorge Guzmán (2023)
- Franklyn Kilome (2023)
- Édgar García (2023)
- Austin Davis (2023)
- Kevin Maitán (2023)
- Juan Graterol (2023)
- Kyle McGowin (2023)
- Curtis Terry (2023–2024)
- Marek Chlup (2023–2024)
- Deivy Grullón (2024)
- Sterling Sharp (2024)
- Brett Conine (2024–present)
- Bryan Bonnell (2024)
- Eric Hanhold (2024)
- Jon Duplantier (2024)
- Chavez Young (2024–present)
