= Jorge Guzmán (baseball) =

Dominican baseball player (born 1996)

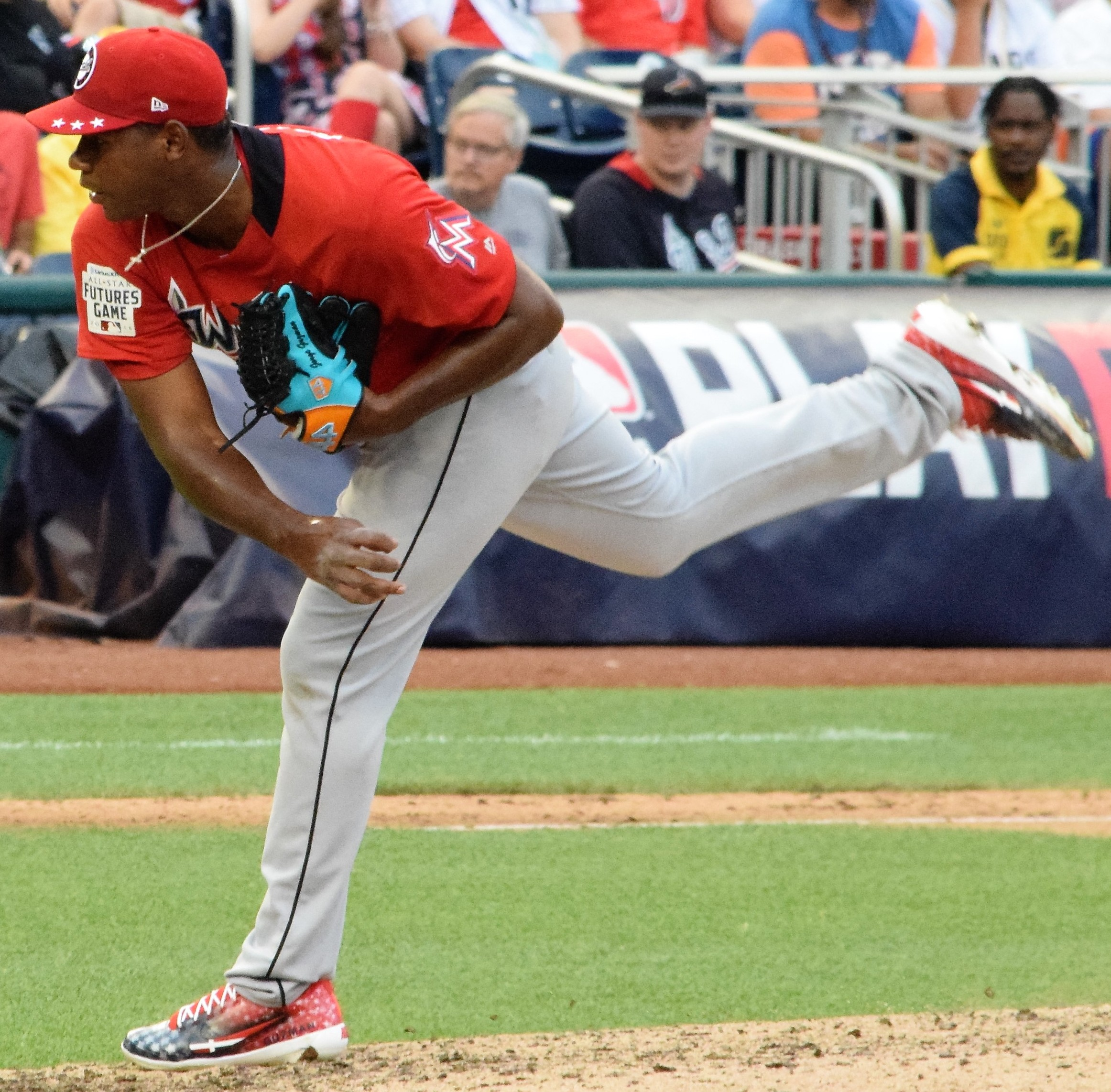
- Guzmán at the 2018 All-Star Futures Game
- Pitcher
- Born: January 28, 1996 (age 30); Las Matas de Santa Cruz, Dominican Republic
- Batted: Right Threw: Right

MLB debut
- August 6, 2020, for the Miami Marlins

Last MLB appearance
- August 18, 2021, for the Miami Marlins

MLB statistics
- Win–loss record: 0–0
- Earned run average: 27.00
- Strikeouts: 3
- Stats at Baseball Reference

Teams
- Miami Marlins (2020–2021)

Jorge Guzmán Florentino (born January 28, 1996) is a Dominican former professional baseball pitcher. He has previously played in Major League Baseball (MLB) for the Miami Marlins.

== Career ==
=== Houston Astros ===
Guzmán signed with the Houston Astros as an international free agent on June 15, 2014. He made his professional debut in 2015 with the Dominican Summer League Astros and also played for the rookie–level Gulf Coast League Astros that season, posting a combined 5.04 ERA in 55 1/3 innings pitched between both teams. In 2016, he played for the GCL Astros and rookie–level Greeneville Astros and pitched to a combined 3–4 record and 4.05 ERA with 54 strikeouts in 40 innings pitched between both affiliates.

=== New York Yankees ===
On November 17, 2016, Guzmán was traded from the Astros, along with Albert Abreu, to the New York Yankees in exchange for Brian McCann. He spent the 2017 season with the Low–A Staten Island Yankees where he posted a 5–3 record and 2.30 ERA with 88 strikeouts in 66 2/3 innings pitched across 13 starts.

=== Miami Marlins ===
On December 11, 2017, Guzmán was traded to the Miami Marlins (along with Starlin Castro and José Devers) in exchange for outfielder Giancarlo Stanton and cash considerations. He spent the 2018 season with the High–A Jupiter Hammerheads, going 0–9 with a 4.03 ERA in 21 starts.

On November 20, 2018, the Marlins added Guzmán to their 40-man roster to protect him from the Rule 5 draft. He spent 2019 with the Double–A Jacksonville Jumbo Shrimp, going 7–11 with a 3.50 ERA over 25 games (24 starts), striking out 127 over 138 2/3 innings.

On August 3, 2020, Guzmán was promoted to the Major Leagues. Guzmán made his MLB debut on August 6, against the Baltimore Orioles, and allowed 2 runs in an inning of work.

On May 9, 2021, Guzmán was placed on the 60-day injured list with elbow inflammation. He was activated off of the injured list on July 13. On September 3, Guzmán was placed back on the 60-day injured list with right elbow soreness. In 2 games for Miami, Guzmán had surrendered 6 runs on 4 hits and 6 walks with 3 strikeouts in 1 2/3 innings of work. On October 27, he was removed from the 40-man roster and sent outright to Triple–A Jacksonville. He elected free agency following the season on November 7.

=== San Francisco Giants ===
On January 31, 2022, Guzmán signed a minor league contract with the San Francisco Giants organization. He spent a chunk of the season on rehab assignment, appearing for the rookie–level Arizona Complex League Giants, Single–A San Jose Giants, and High–A Eugene Emeralds. Once healthy, he joined the Double–A Richmond Flying Squirrels, where he struggled to a 22.50 ERA across two appearances. Overall, he made 16 appearances on the season, recording a 3.63 ERA with 24 strikeouts in 17 1/3 innings pitched.

Guzmán began the 2023 season with the Triple–A Sacramento River Cats, making 27 appearances and registering a 3.00 ERA with 26 strikeouts in 36 innings pitched. He was released by the Giants organization on June 28, 2023.

=== Lake Country DockHounds ===
On July 21, 2023, Guzmán signed with the Lake Country DockHounds of the American Association of Professional Baseball. In two starts for Lake Country, he surrendered nine runs on six hits and seven walks across three innings of work.

=== Acereros de Monclova ===
On July 27, 2023, Guzmán was traded to the Acereros de Monclova of the Mexican League. He became a free agent following the season without appearing in a game with Monclova.
