= USS Michigan =

Three ships of the United States Navy have been named USS Michigan in honor of the 26th state.

- USS Michigan (1843) was the U.S. Navy's first iron-hulled warship. Launched in 1843, she operated on the Great Lakes for her entire career, was later renamed Wolverine and was decommissioned in 1912.
- USS Michigan (BB-27) was a South Carolina-class battleship that saw action against Mexico and escorted convoys during World War I.
- USS Michigan (SSGN-727) is an Ohio-class submarine, originally designated SSBN-727 as a ballistic missile submarine. She was converted into a guided missile submarine (SSGN) in 2006 and is currently in active service.
