= Starlin Castro =

Dominican baseball player (born 1990)

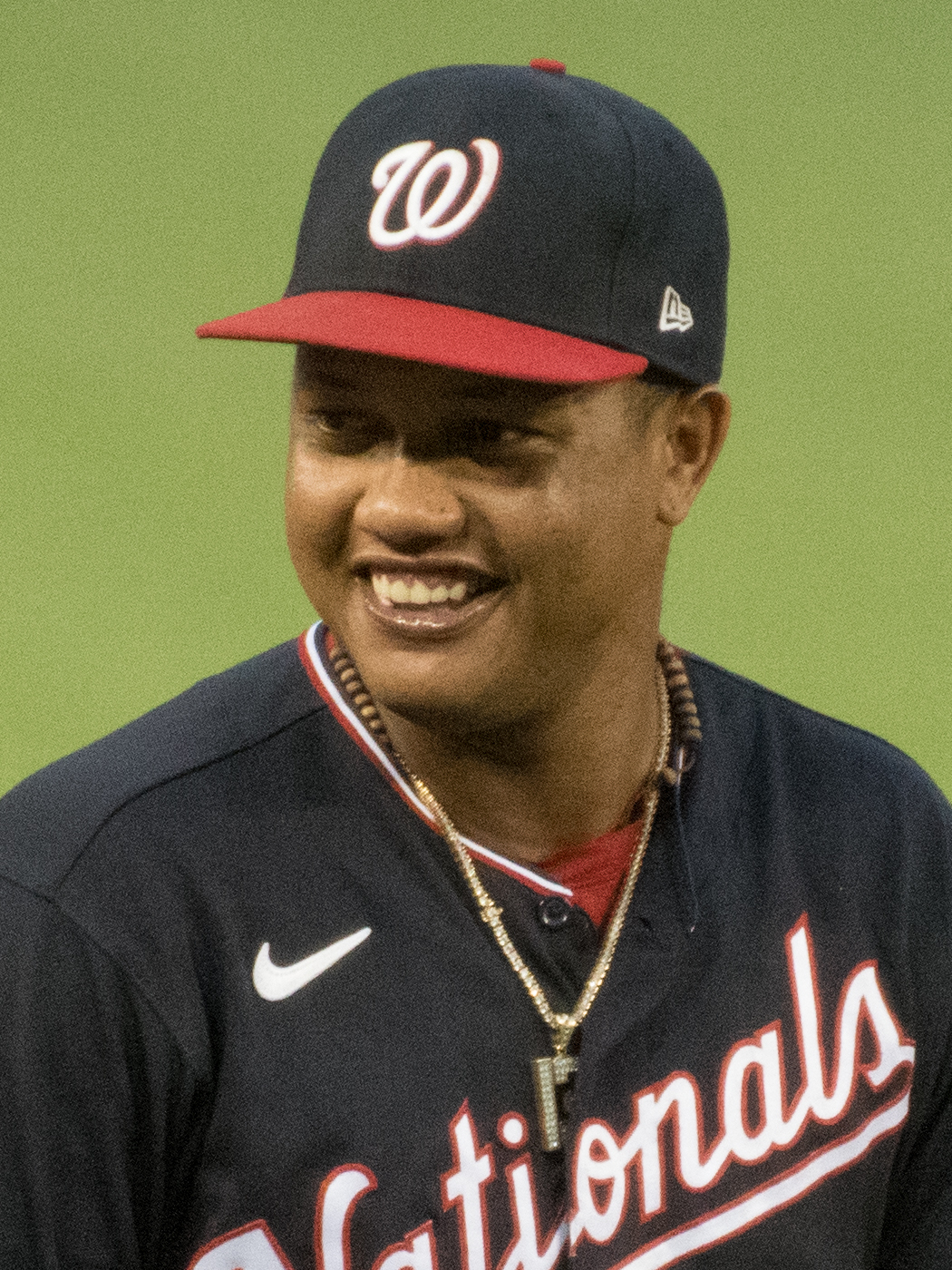
- Castro with the Washington Nationals in 2021
- Shortstop / Second baseman
- Born: March 24, 1990 (age 36); Monte Cristi, Dominican Republic
- Batted: Right Threw: Right

MLB debut
- May 7, 2010, for the Chicago Cubs

Last MLB appearance
- July 11, 2021, for the Washington Nationals

MLB statistics
- Batting average: .280
- Home runs: 138
- Runs batted in: 678
- Stats at Baseball Reference

Teams
- Chicago Cubs (2010–2015); New York Yankees (2016–2017); Miami Marlins (2018–2019); Washington Nationals (2020–2021)

Career highlights and awards
- 4× All-Star (2011, 2012, 2014, 2017)

Starlin DeJesus Castro (born March 24, 1990) is a Dominican former professional baseball shortstop and second baseman. He played in Major League Baseball (MLB) for the Chicago Cubs, New York Yankees, Miami Marlins, and Washington Nationals. Castro is a four-time MLB All-Star and holds the record for most runs batted in in an MLB debut. In 2011, he led the National League in hits, becoming the youngest player to do so.

== Professional career ==
=== Minor leagues ===
In 2009, Castro was named to the Florida State League All-Star team, and won MVP honors, going 4-for-4 with an inside-the-park home run in the game. He was also named All-Star Futures Game for the World Team. After the season, Castro was named the best prospect in Chicago's organization by Baseball America.

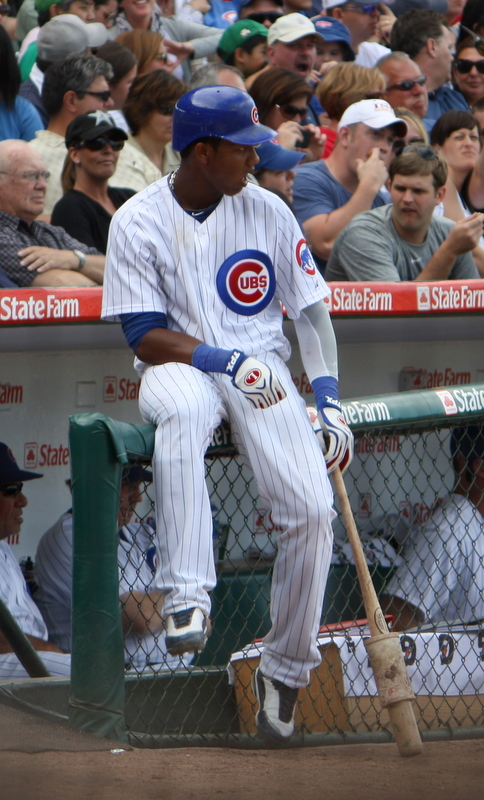
Castro with the Chicago Cubs in 2010

=== Chicago Cubs ===
==== 2010 ====
Castro was called up to the majors on May 7, 2010, from the Tennessee Smokies, the Cubs Double-A affiliate. He became the first major league player born in the 1990s.

In his first major league at-bat, he hit a three-run home run off Homer Bailey of the Cincinnati Reds. He became the sixth player in Cubs history and 106th player overall to hit a home run in his first MLB at-bat. Later in the game he hit a triple with the bases loaded, setting the record for most runs batted in (RBIs) in a major league debut with six. He finished the game two for five in the Cubs' 14–7 win. Castro finished the season with a .300/.347/.408 line with three home runs and 41 RBIs in 463 at-bats over 125 games. Despite his significant offensive contribution, Castro led the team and was second in the National League in errors with 27.

On October 19, 2010, Castro was named the shortstop on Baseball America's 2010 All-Rookie Team. He was also named the shortstop on the 2010 Topps Major League Rookie All-Star Team. He finished tied for fifth in Rookie of the Year voting.

==== 2011: All-Star season ====
2011 was Castro's first full season as an MLB player, and also marked his first All-Star Game selection, as he was one of three shortstops selected to the National League All-Star team. Castro was the youngest Chicago Cub player to make an All-Star team. Castro stole two bases in the All-Star Game despite having only one plate appearance, tying him for the most stolen bases in a single All-Star Game. The same day, Castro received Edward Jones Player of the Month Award honors. Castro was the National League Player of the Week twice during the 2011 season.

On September 23, 2011, Castro got his 200th base hit of the season, at Busch Stadium against the rival St. Louis Cardinals, and was the youngest member of the Cubs to ever do so.

Castro was the youngest player to ever lead the National League in hits, achieving the feat with his 207th hit of the season on September 28, 2011. Castro's game jersey was sent to the Hall of Fame, in a similar manner to his MLB debut's game jersey. His line for the 2011 season was .307/.341/.432, and it was the first season in which he hit double digit home runs (10). Overall, Castro finished the 2011 season with a .307 batting average, 10 home runs and 66 RBI. His 207 base hits and 674 at-bats both led the National League.

On defense, he led all National League shortstops in assists, with 446, and all major league shortstops in errors, with 29. He also had the lowest fielding percentage for a shortstop (.961).

==== 2012: All-Star season ====
Castro was selected to the National League All-Star team along with teammate Bryan LaHair. Castro finished the 2012 season playing all 162 games with a .283 average, 14 homers, and 78 RBI. He was caught stealing 13 times which led MLB. He also led the National League again with 646 at-bats and 465 assists as a shortstop. In August, Castro and the Cubs agreed to a contract extension through the 2019 season with a team option for 2020, with total guaranteed compensation of $60 million.

==== 2013 ====
Castro had his worst year ending with a career low batting average of .245. He hit 10 home runs and had 44 RBIs, nine steals, and 2 triples while playing in 161 games.

==== 2014: All-Star season ====
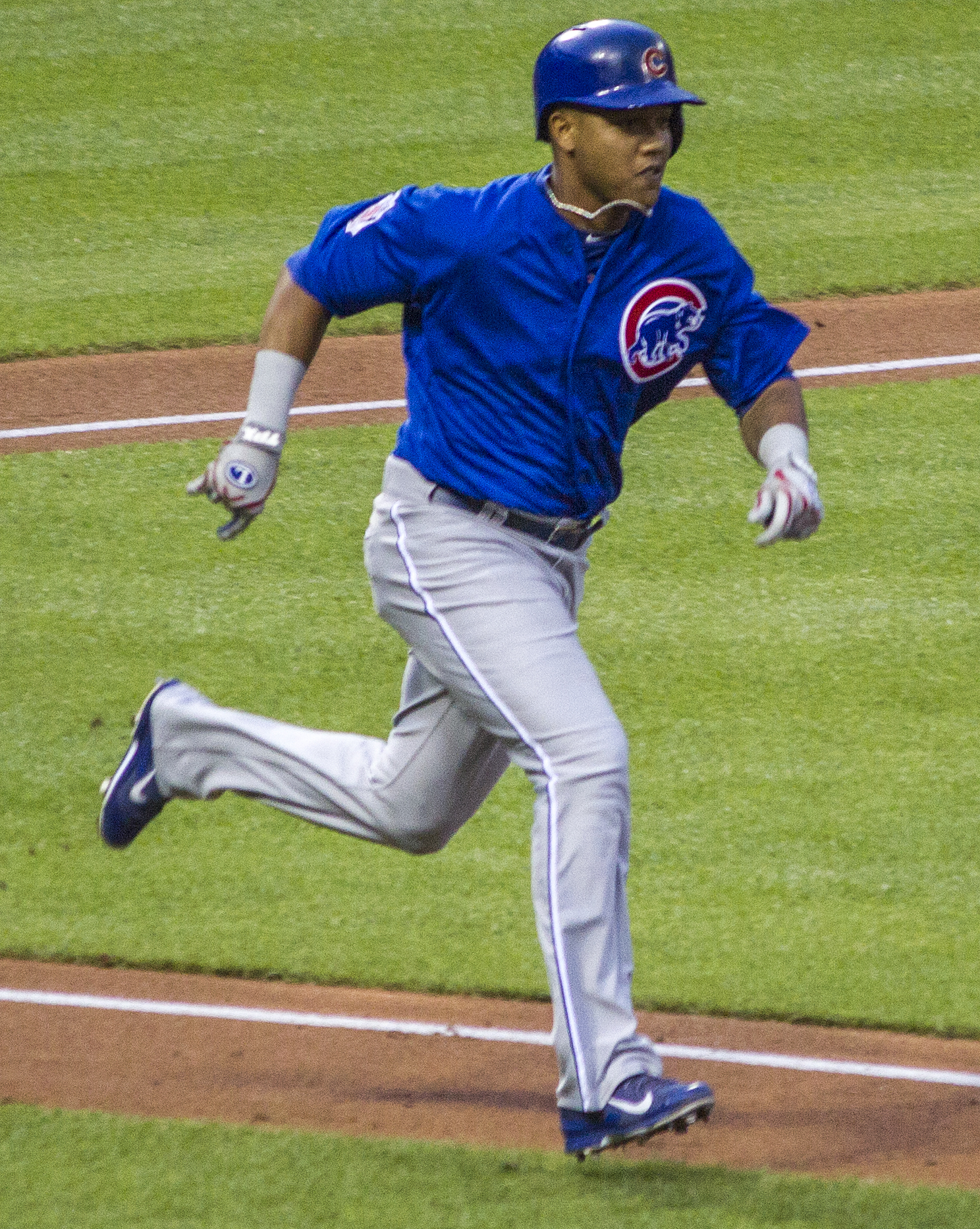
Castro playing for the Chicago Cubs in 2014

After a disappointing 2013, Castro was selected to appear in his third All-Star game along with teammate Anthony Rizzo in 2014. Unfortunately, Castro's All-Star year came to an early end when he was injured on September 2 when he awkwardly slid into home plate in a game against the Milwaukee Brewers. He did not return for the balance of the year and finished with a strong batting average of .292 with 14 home runs, 65 RBI's, 4 stolen bases, 33 doubles and 1 triple in 528 at bats.

Castro was the top hitting shortstop (for batting average) in the National League ahead of the Dodgers' Hanley Ramírez. On defense, he had only 15 errors and a fielding percentage of .973.

==== 2015 ====
During a game on April 20, 2015, against the Pirates in Pittsburgh, Castro hit a ball that went foul behind home plate and struck a fan in her head. The game was delayed for 23 minutes until the fan was escorted on a stretcher and hospitalized due to a concussion.

Come the trade deadline, there was much speculation of a trade involving Castro. Potential deals might have involved him going to the Phillies or the Padres. Amid the speculation, Castro was told by manager Joe Maddon that he would not be traded.

In August, Castro was benched by Cubs manager Joe Maddon due to poor performance, including a career low .236 batting average. With rookie Addison Russell taking over as the everyday shortstop, Castro made the switch to second base on August 12. On September 18, in an important game against the division leading Cardinals, Castro hit two home runs and matched his career high with six RBIs to lead the Cubs to an 8–3 win.

=== New York Yankees ===
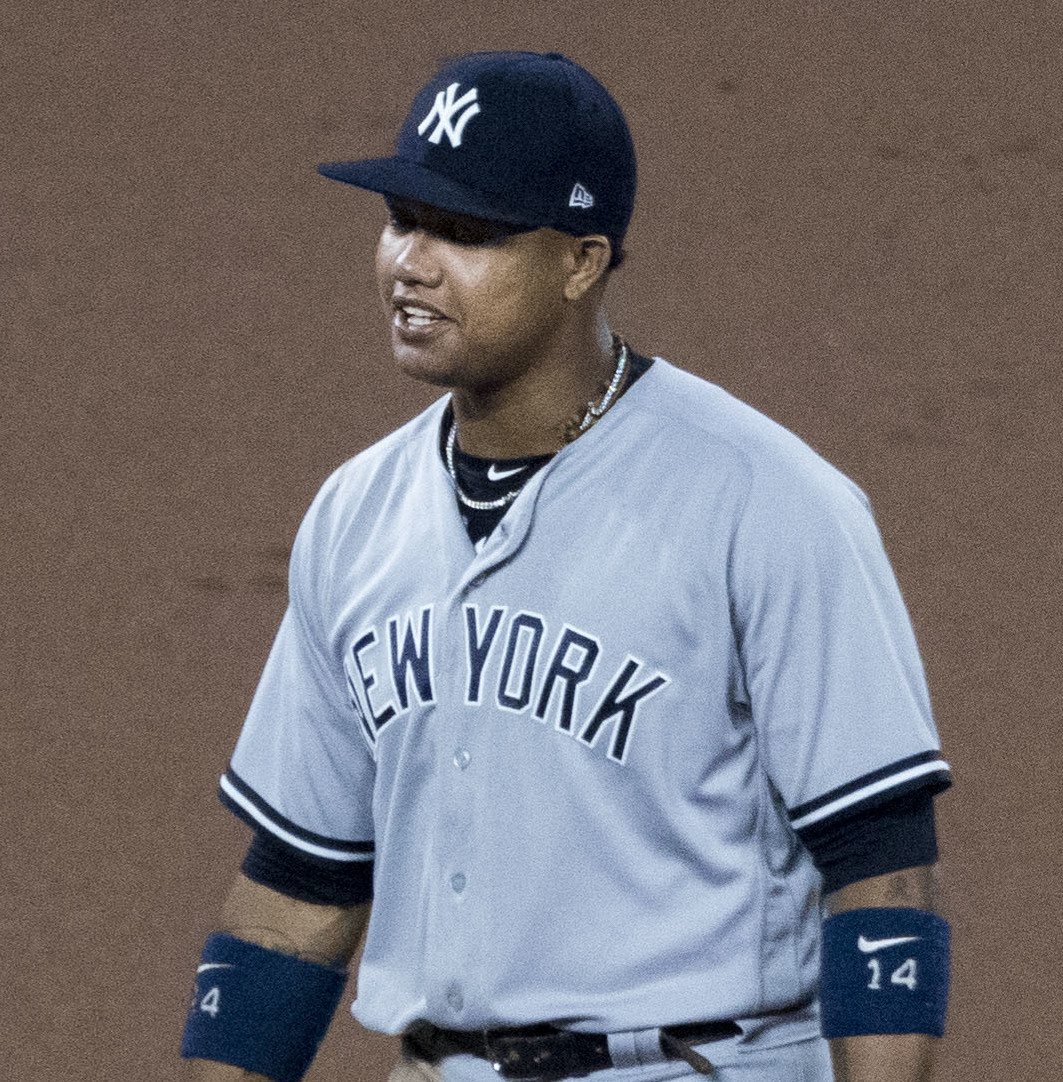
Starlin Castro with the New York Yankees on September 5, 2017

On December 8, 2015, Castro was traded to the New York Yankees in exchange for pitcher Adam Warren and a player to be named later. On December 15, 2015, Brendan Ryan was also traded to the Cubs to finalize the transaction.

On April 6, 2016, Castro had 5 RBI in a win over the Houston Astros, and he broke the franchise record for most RBI in the first two career games with the Yankees with 7, and the fourth player to get 7 RBI in the first two games in a season. On April 9, Castro recorded his 1000th career hit, in a win over the Detroit Tigers. On June 22, Castro hit his first ever walk-off home run in a 9–8 win over the Rockies. Castro finished the season with a .270 batting average and a career high 21 home runs and 70 RBI.

On April 28, 2017, Castro hit a game tying 2-run home run in the 9th inning of an eventual 14–11 Yankees comeback win against the Baltimore Orioles. On June 27, he was placed on the 10-day disabled list due to a hamstring injury. On July 22, he was again placed on the 10-day disabled list due to the same hamstring problem. Castro finished 2017 with a .300 batting average with 16 home runs and 63 RBI in 112 games played.

=== Miami Marlins ===
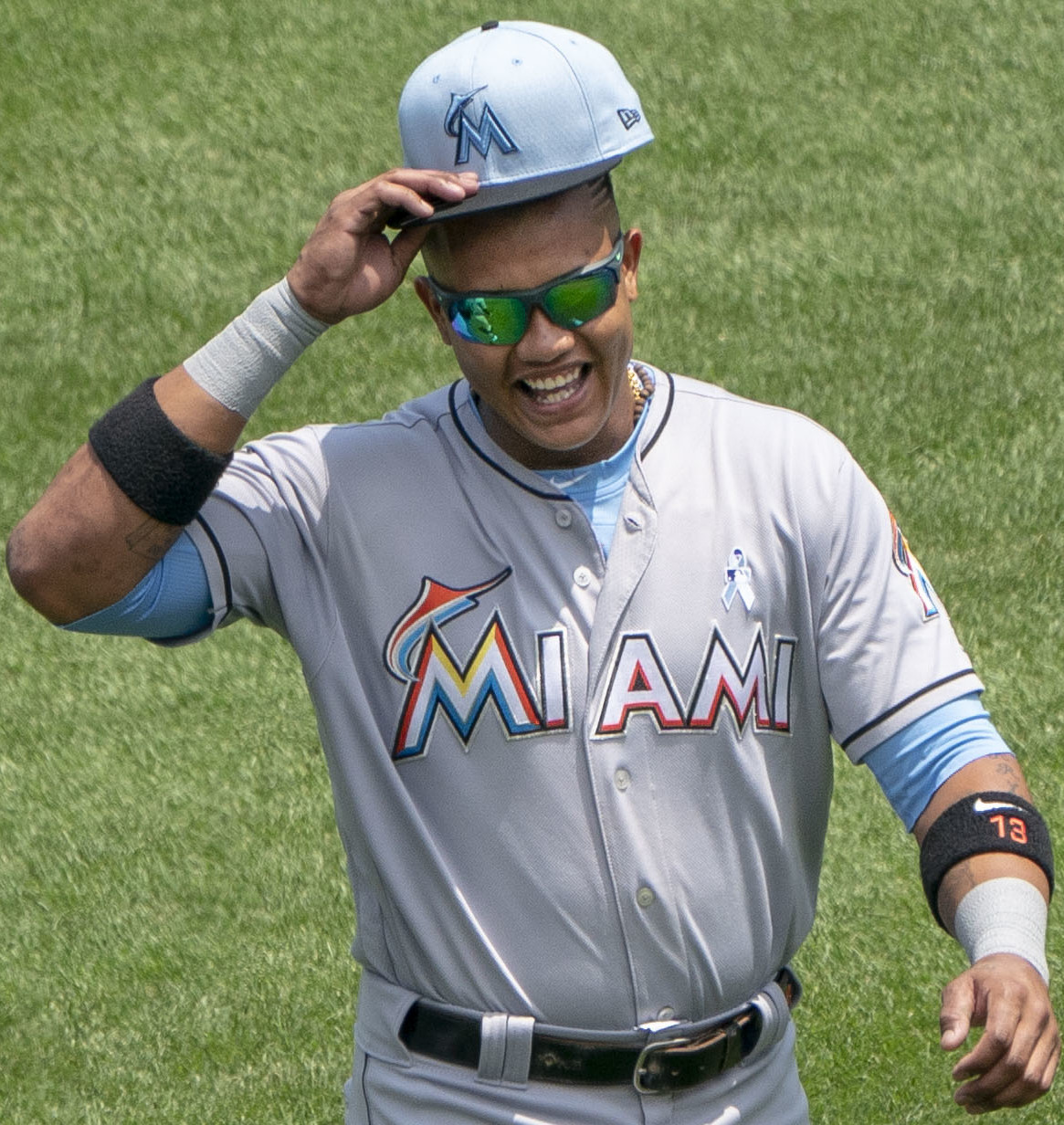
Castro with the Marlins in 2018

On December 11, 2017, Castro was traded to the Miami Marlins (along with Jorge Guzmán and José Devers) in exchange for outfielder Giancarlo Stanton and cash considerations. He finished his first season with the Marlins with a .278 batting average and 12 home runs and 54 RBI.

Castro entered 2019 as a prominent trade candidate for the Marlins, but he struggled offensively throughout the first half of the season and did not attract much interest prior to the July 31 trade deadline. He transitioned from second base to third base in early August when the team promoted prospect Isan Díaz from the minor leagues. Castro's performance improved late in the season and he finished with a .270 batting average and set new career highs with 22 home runs and 86 RBI. He was one of only five MLB players in 2019 to play the full 162-game schedule.

On October 31, 2019, the Marlins declined their 2020 option on him and made him a free agent.

=== Washington Nationals ===
The Washington Nationals signed Castro to a two-year contract reportedly valued at $12 million on January 7, 2020. On July 23, 2020, Castro was the starting second baseman, making his Nationals debut on Opening Day against his former team, the New York Yankees. In an August 14 game against the Baltimore Orioles, Castro suffered a broken wrist attempting to make a diving play in the sixth inning. On August 22, it was announced that Castro had undergone surgery on the wrist and would miss the remainder of the year. On the season, Castro slashed .267/.302/.405 with 2 home runs and 4 RBI.

On June 15, 2021, Castro was placed on the restricted list after leaving the team to deal with a “family matter which requires his immediate attention.”

Castro was released by the Nationals on September 2, 2021, shortly after the conclusion of his 30-game suspension for violating the MLB domestic violence policy.

=== Leones de Yucatán ===
On June 27, 2022, Castro signed with the Leones de Yucatán of the Mexican League. In 28 games, he batted .240/.312/.323 with 1 home run and 9 RBIs. Castro left the team on August 14, for what the club cited as personal reasons.

=== Spire City Ghost Hounds/Frederick ALPB ===
On April 24, 2023, Castro signed with the Spire City Ghost Hounds of the Atlantic League of Professional Baseball, who were referred to at the time as just the "Frederick Baseball Club", "Unnamed Frederick Baseball Team" or the "Frederick ALPB" because they didn't decide on the "Ghost Hound" moniker until later that season in June. The team wore jerseys with question marks in that period of time when they were unnamed. In 43 games for Spire City/Frederick, he batted .305/.357/.383 with one home run and 24 RBI. On September 22, 2023, the Ghost Hounds announced that they would not be participating in the upcoming 2024 Atlantic League season due to scheduling issues, having a shared stadium and the league needing an even number of teams, but the team will be returning in 2025. On November 2, a dispersal draft was held for the other ALPB teams to get an opportunity to select players who were under contract with the Ghost Hounds. Castro became a free agent after he was not selected in the Ghost Hounds dispersal draft.

== Legal issues ==
On July 16, 2021, Major League Baseball announced it had begun an investigation into domestic violence allegations that had been brought against Castro, and he was placed on administrative leave. On July 30, Castro was suspended 30 games without pay and fined an undisclosed amount for violation of the league's joint domestic violence policy. The Nationals announced shortly afterward that they would be releasing Castro after his suspension was served.

== See also ==
- List of players with a home run in first major league at-bat
