= Mike Cervenak =

American baseball player (born 1976)

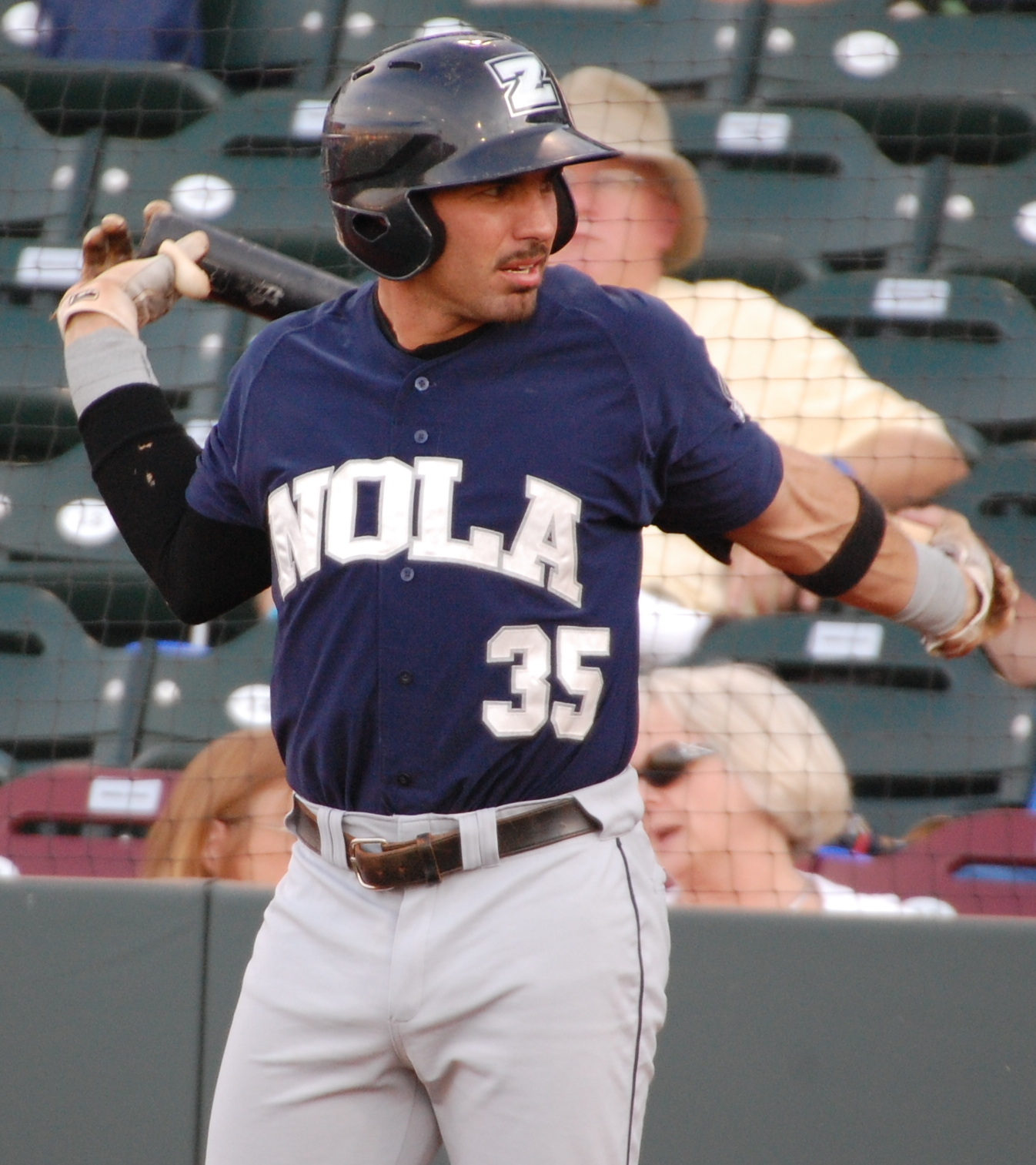
- Cervenak with the New Orleans Zephyrs in 2012
- Third baseman
- Born: August 17, 1976 (age 49); Trenton, Michigan, U.S.
- Batted: Right Threw: Right

Professional debut
- KBO: April 8, 2006, for the Kia Tigers
- MLB: July 11, 2008, for the Philadelphia Phillies
- CPBL: March 23, 2013, for the Uni-President 7-Eleven Lions

Last appearance
- KBO: June 15, 2006, for the Kia Tigers
- MLB: September 28, 2008, for the Philadelphia Phillies
- CPBL: April 26, 2013, for the Uni-President 7-Eleven Lions

KBO statistics
- Batting average: .224
- Home runs: 4
- Runs batted in: 15

MLB statistics
- Batting average: .154
- Home runs: 0
- Runs batted in: 1

CPBL statistics
- Batting average: .260
- Home runs: 2
- Runs batted in: 13
- Stats at Baseball Reference

Teams
- Kia Tigers (2006); Philadelphia Phillies (2008); Uni-President 7-Eleven Lions (2013)

Michael Christopher Cervenak (born August 17, 1976) is an American former professional baseball third baseman, who played in Major League Baseball for the Philadelphia Phillies in 2008.

Until Cervenak made his big league debut with the Phillies on July 11, 2008, he was a career minor leaguer, and the embodiment of a journeyman player, having spent time in three minor league organizations at several levels of play, overseas in the KBO League, and in an independent league. Having spent an extensive part of his career playing for the Norwich Navigators, residents of the area dubbed him the "Mayor of Norwich."

== Personal ==
Cervenak's mother is from a city in the former Czechoslovakia (which is now in Slovakia).

== Playing career ==
=== 1998–2007: Independent baseball and the minor leagues ===
While a college student, Cervenak played for the Alaska Goldpanners of Fairbanks in 1998, an independent team, as a teammate of Aaron Heilman. He made an appearance in the annual Midnight Sun Game. After graduating from the University of Michigan, Cervenak was not drafted in 1999. This led him to sign with the Chillicothe Paints of the Frontier League, where he played into the 2000 season.

Cervenak was signed out of the Frontier League by the New York Yankees organization, playing 38 games and batting .329 at Single-A Greensboro over the rest of the year. He spent all of 2001 and 2002 at Double-A Norwich, hitting 21 home runs and tallying 91 RBI in the last year of his Yankees career. He was selected by the San Francisco Giants in the Rule 5 draft at the end of the 2002 season. Cervenak remained at Norwich for the 2003 and 2004 seasons, now a member of the Giants' farm system. He batted .270 with 20 home runs and 91 RBI in 2003 when he was named to the All-Star team, and he won the minor league triple crown in 2004. He led the Giants organization in batting average (.328), home runs (26), and RBIs (98) between Norwich and Triple-A Fresno. The Giants sent him to the Arizona Fall League to aid his development at the end of the season. He was named a post-season All-Star for the 2004 season.

Cervenak spent the entire 2005 season at Fresno, leading the league in RBIs with 103. He also batted .338 with runners in scoring position over the course of the 2005 season, had two 11-game hitting streaks in the year, and was named a mid-season All-Star. His overall batting average for the year was .312, and he led the team in games played at third base with 50, though he also played 75 games at first base. Cervenak led the team in games played, at-bats, hits and runs batted in; however, the Giants released him at the end of the season. Rather than returning to American affiliated baseball, Cervenak chose to sign with the Kia Tigers of the Korean Baseball League. He opened the season poorly, batting only .224. The Tigers released him, and Cervenak returned to Fresno, batting .413 over his first 12 games. Throughout the year, he managed to play all over the infield, playing first base, second base and third base, and as a designated hitter. Cervenak played for Norfolk, an Orioles affiliate, in 2007, where he batted .283 in 140 games. He hit 15 home runs, batted in 78 runs, and had an OPS of .740. He led the team in RBIs and home runs, as well as games played (140), at-bats (554), runs scored (69), and hits (157).

In between, Cervenak played winter ball from 2006 through 2013 for several clubs of the Dominican Republic PBL, Mexican PL, and Venezuelan PBL circuits.

=== 2008–2013: Major league career ===
After the 2007 season, he signed with the Phillies and began the season at Triple-A Lehigh Valley, where he recorded a franchise-record 18-game hitting streak during the season. Cervenak was first called up to the major leagues on July 10, 2008, to replace J. A. Happ on the Phillies' roster, after spending 1,088 games in the minor leagues. Cervenak's role was to provide an extra bat off the bench, since the Phillies did not need their fifth starter over the All-Star break. He was batting .310 with 7 home runs and 52 RBIs at the time of his call-up. He made his major league debut pinch-hitting for J. C. Romero against the Arizona Diamondbacks, but was optioned back to Triple-A on July 21. He was recalled to take Pedro Feliz' place on the roster on July 29, after Feliz sat out three straight games with a back injury. His first major league hit came on August 6, a single to left field against the Florida Marlins, which also notched his first RBI, driving in third baseman Eric Bruntlett. After compiling a total of seven major league at-bats, Cervenak was optioned to the minors on August 16 to make room on the roster for Rudy Seánez. After being brought up on September 1 for roster expansion, Cervenak promptly raised his average to .250 with a pinch-hit single up the middle, his second major-league hit. The Phillies would win the World Series in 2008. Though Cervenak was not part of the postseason roster, he did travel with the team and was in uniform for all of the club's playoff games. In November 2009 Cervenak was released by the Phillies, and on December 18, 2009 he signed a minor league deal with the New York Mets. He signed a minor league contract with the Florida Marlins for the 2011 season. Cervenak began the 2013 season with the Uni-President 7-Eleven Lions of the Chinese Professional Baseball League. On June 3, 2013, Cervenak signed a minor league contract with the Detroit Tigers and was assigned to Triple-A Toledo.

=== 2013 World Baseball Classic ===
Cervenak played for the Czech Republic in the qualifying rounds of the 2013 World Baseball Classic.
