= 2013 World Baseball Classic – Qualifier 2 =

Sporting event

Qualifier 2 of the qualifications of the 2013 World Baseball Classic was held at Armin-Wolf-Arena, Regensburg, Germany from September 20 to 24, 2012.

Qualifier 2 was a modified double-elimination tournament. The winners for the first games matched up in the second game, while the losers faced each other in an elimination game. The winners of the elimination game then played the losers of the non-elimination game in another elimination game. The remaining two teams then played each other to determine the winners of the Qualifier 2.

== Bracket ==
Preliminaries
–	Great Britain	1
–	Canada	11
–	Czech Republic	1
–	Germany	16
Lower round 1
L1	Great Britain	12
L2	Czech Republic	5

Semifinals
W1	Canada	16
W2	Germany	7
Lower final
W3	Great Britain	1
L4	Germany	16

Qualifier
W4	Canada	11
W5	Germany	1

== Results ==
- All times are Central European Summer Time (UTC+02:00).

=== Canada 11, Great Britain 1 ===
September 20 19:00 at Armin-Wolf-Arena
Team	1	2	3	4	5	6	7	8	9	R	H	E
Great Britain	0	0	0	0	0	1	0	X	X	1	4	3
Canada	2	0	0	0	1	0	8	X	X	11	11	1
WP: Shawn Hill (1–0) LP: Chris Reed (0–1) Sv: Chris Kissock (1); Home runs: GBR: Albert Cartwright (1); CAN: Jimmy Van Ostrand (1); Attendance: 3,704 (37.0%); Umpires: HP − Stephen Barga, 1B − Will Little, 2B − Liang-kuei Hsieh, 3B − Marco Screti; Notes: Completed early due to 10–run mercy rule after 7 innings. One out when last run scored. Boxscore

=== Germany 16, Czech Republic 1 ===
September 21 19:00 at Armin-Wolf-Arena
Team	1	2	3	4	5	6	7	8	9	R	H	E
Czech Republic	0	0	0	0	1	0	X	X	X	1	5	2
Germany	3	0	0	0	8	5	X	X	X	16	10	1
WP: Mike Bolsenbroek (1–0) LP: Michael Sobotka (0–1); Home runs: CZE: None; GER: Matt Weaver (1); Attendance: 3,019 (30.2%); Umpires: HP − Ben May, 1B − Michael Ulloa, 2B − Marco Screti, 3B − Will Little; Notes: Completed early due to 15–run mercy rule after 6 innings. Two outs when last run scored. Boxscore

=== Great Britain 12, Czech Republic 5 ===
September 22 13:00 at Armin-Wolf-Arena
Team	1	2	3	4	5	6	7	8	9	R	H	E
Great Britain	3	0	3	1	0	0	3	2	0	12	13	2
Czech Republic	0	0	2	0	0	0	2	1	0	5	10	1
WP: Jake Esch (1–0) LP: Jan Blažek (0–1); Home runs: GBR: B.J. Hubbert (1); CZE: None; Attendance: 1,806 (18.1%); Umpires: HP − Marco Screti, 1B − Stephen Barga, 2B − Liang-kuei Hsieh, 3B − Ben May; Boxscore

=== Canada 16, Germany 7 ===
September 22 19:00 at Armin-Wolf-Arena
Team	1	2	3	4	5	6	7	8	9	R	H	E
Canada	3	0	1	0	0	0	5	2	5	16	21	1
Germany	0	3	1	0	0	0	2	0	1	7	12	2
WP: Sheldon McDonald (1–0) LP: Luke Sommer (0–1); Home runs: CAN: Jimmy Van Ostrand 2 (3), Tyson Gillies (1), Jordan Lennerton (1), Rene Tosoni (1); GER: None; Attendance: 4,085 (40.9%); Umpires: HP − Will Little, 1B − Ben May, 2B − Michael Ulloa, 3B − Liang-kuei Hsieh; Boxscore

=== Germany 16, Great Britain 1 ===
September 23 14:00 at Armin-Wolf-Arena
Team	1	2	3	4	5	6	7	8	9	R	H	E
Germany	3	2	0	0	4	1	6	X	X	16	13	2
Great Britain	0	0	0	0	0	0	1	X	X	1	2	2
WP: Enorbel Marquez (1–0) LP: Kyle Wilson (0–1); Home runs: GER: Aaron Altherr (1), Matt Weaver (2); GBR: None; Attendance: 1,452 (14.5%); Umpires: HP − Stephen Barga, 1B − Ben May, 2B − Michael Ulloa, 3B − Liang-kuei Hsieh; Notes: Completed early due to 10–run mercy rule after 7 innings. Boxscore

=== Canada 11, Germany 1 ===
September 24 19:00 at Armin-Wolf-Arena
Team	1	2	3	4	5	6	7	8	9	R	H	E
Germany	0	0	0	0	1	0	0	0	X	1	3	3
Canada	4	3	0	1	0	0	0	3	X	11	12	0
WP: Andrew Albers (1–0) LP: Andre Hughes (0–1); Home runs: GER: Aaron Altherr (2); CAN: Chris Robinson (1), Adam Loewen (1), Jimmy Van Ostrand (4); Attendance: 3,120 (31.2%); Umpires: HP − Ben May, 1B − Will Little, 2B − Michael Ulloa, 3B − Marco Screti; Notes: Completed early due to 10–run mercy rule after 8 innings. Two outs when last run scored. Boxscore
