= The Joe =

The Joe may refer to either one of the following sporting venues:

- Joe Louis Arena, former home of the Detroit Red Wings (demolished)
- Sewell–Thomas Stadium, home stadium of the Alabama Crimson Tide baseball team
- Joseph L. Bruno Stadium, home of the Tri-City ValleyCats
