= Denis Phipps =

Dominican baseball player (born 1985)

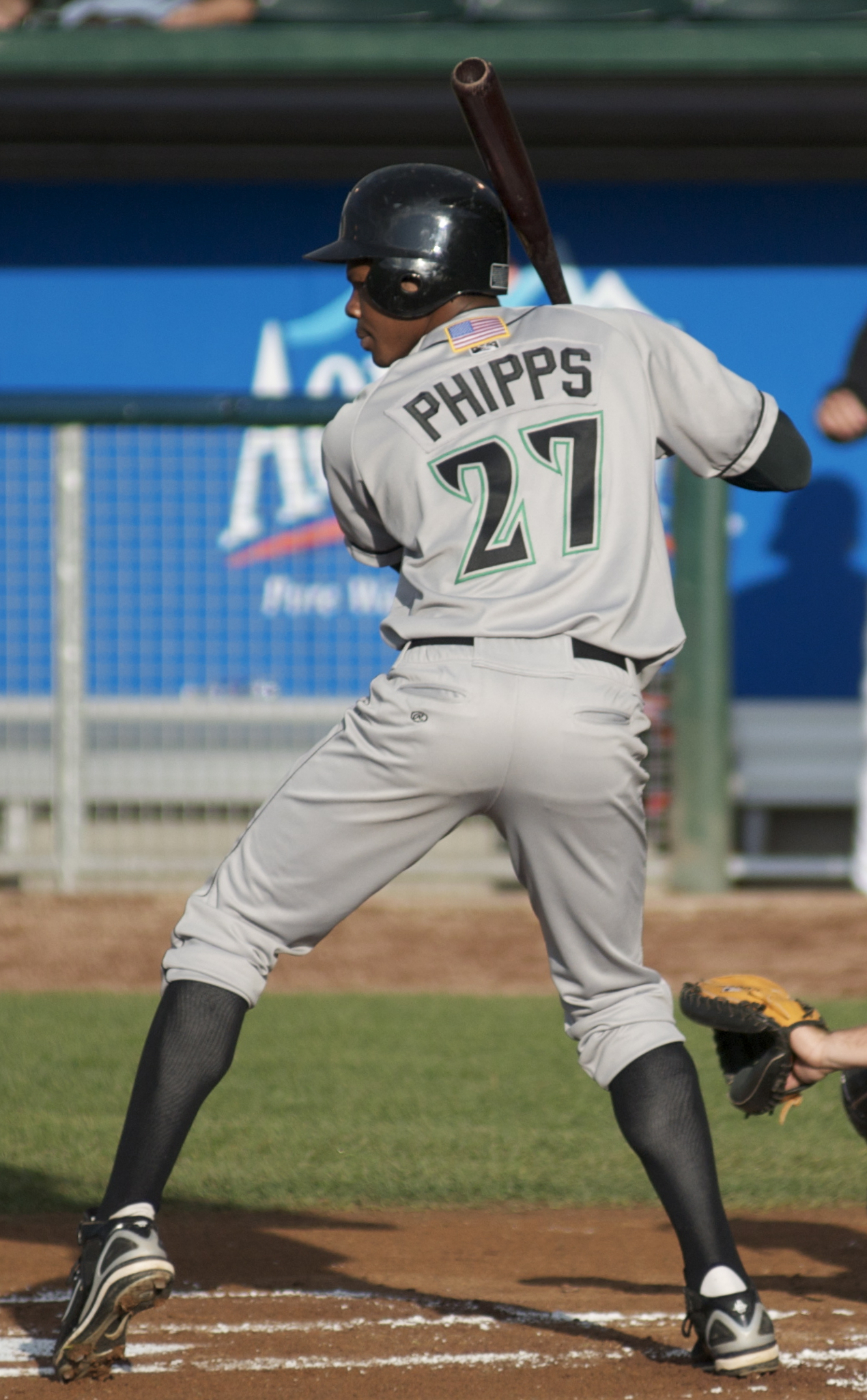
- Phipps batting for the Dayton Dragons, the Single-A affiliates of the Cincinnati Reds, in 2008
- Outfielder
- Born: July 22, 1985 (age 40); San Pedro de Macoris, Dominican Republic
- Batted: Right Threw: Right

MLB debut
- September 3, 2012, for the Cincinnati Reds

Last MLB appearance
- September 30, 2012, for the Cincinnati Reds

MLB statistics
- Batting average: .300
- Home runs: 1
- Runs batted in: 2
- Stats at Baseball Reference

Teams
- Cincinnati Reds (2012)

Denis Phipps (born July 22, 1985) is a Dominican former professional baseball outfielder. He played in Major League Baseball (MLB) for the Cincinnati Reds in 2012.

== Career ==
=== Cincinnati Reds ===
On May 3, 2004, Phipps signed with the Cincinnati Reds as an international free agent. He spent his first professional season with the rookie–level Gulf Coast League Reds and Billings Mustangs in 2006. Phipps spent the next two seasons with the Single–A Dayton Dragons, hitting .238 with nine home runs, 53 RBI, and 18 stolen bases in 2007, and hitting .255 with seven home runs, 57 RBI, 10 stolen bases in 2008.

Phipps spent the 2009 season with the High–A Sarasota Reds, also appearing in 3 games for the Double–A Carolina Mudcats. In 134 games for Sarasota, he posted a .239/.288/.385 batting line with 10 home runs, 55 RBI, and 18 stolen bases. Phipps played in 129 games split between the High–A Lynchburg Hillcats and Carolina in 2010, slashing .250/.316/.413 with 12 home runs, 56 RBI, and 17 stolen bases. He spent 2011 with Carolina and the Triple–A Louisville Bats, batting a combined .346/.397/.527 with 12 home runs, 64 RBI, and 14 stolen bases.

Phipps played in 97 games split between the rookie–level Arizona League Reds and Louisville, hitting .231/.300/.422 with 17 home runs and 50 RBI. On September 1, 2012, Phipps was selected to the 40-man roster and promoted to the major leagues for the first time. Phipps hit the first home run of his major league career, a two-run shot against the Los Angeles Dodgers' Ronald Belisario on September 23. He played in 8 games for Cincinnati in his rookie campaign, going 3–for–10 (.300) with one home run, two RBI, and one walk. On November 30, Phipps was non–tendered by the Reds, becoming a free agent. He re–signed with the team on a minor league contract the following day. Phipps spent the entirety of the 2013 campaign with Triple–A Louisville, playing in 130 games and slashing .248/.331/.385 with nine home runs, 49 RBI, and 14 stolen bases. He elected free agency following the season on November 4, 2013.

Phipps played in the Dominican Professional Baseball League six seasons with Estrellas Orientales before joining Leones del Escogido for the 2013/14 season, after posting in 17 games an average of .220. He won the 2012 Caribbean Series with Leones del Escogido, playing as a reinforcement and on loan from Estrellas Orientales.

=== Chicago White Sox ===
On November 22, 2013, Phipps signed a minor league contract with the Chicago White Sox. He played in 19 games for the Triple–A Charlotte Knights, hitting .159/.250/.270 with one home run, three RBI, and two stolen bases. Phipps was released by the White Sox organization on May 9, 2014.

=== Broncos de Reynosa ===
On May 28, 2014, Phipps signed with the Broncos de Reynosa of the Mexican League. He played the second half of the 2014 season with the team, hitting .212 in 8 games before he was released on July 17.

=== Laredo Lemurs ===
Phipps subsequently joined the Laredo Lemurs of the American Association of Independent Professional Baseball With the team, he accumulated a .335 with 15 home runs and 15 doubles but was unable to reach the championship series, losing to Wichita in the semifinal round.

Phipps returned to Laredo in 2015, ending the year with a .336 batting average, 17 home runs, 24 doubles, 76 RBI and a league–leading 127 hits. He was selected to the league's post season all-star team.

In the offseason, Phipps initially signed in the Nicaraguan Professional Baseball League with Gigantes de Rivas but later joined the Caribes de Anzoátegui from the Venezuelan Professional Baseball League in November 2015 after posting a .205 batting average in 11 games. He debuted on 21 November 2015 and contributed with his team until losing in the playoffs. He finished the season batting .316 with 6 home runs and 4 doubles.

=== Acereros de Monclova ===
On February 17, 2016, Phipps signed with the Acereros de Monclova of the Mexican League. Before being released on May 24, he played 44 games and slashed .221/.262/.442 with eight home runs and 23 RBI.

=== Laredo Lemurs (second stint) ===
On May 28, 2016, Phipps returned to the Laredo Lemurs of the American Association, marking his third season with the team. He was later chosen to play the 2016 American Association All-Star Game as a designated hitter. Phipps played 92 games for Laredo, slashing .280/.364/.538 with 24 home runs, 62 RBI, and 21 stolen bases. He was the second player in the league who recorded at least 20 home runs and 20 stolen bases.

Phipps returned to the Venezuelan league with Caribes de Anzoátegui during the offseason, winning the Producer of the Year award and was third in the Most Valuable Player voting, when he batted .327 with 11 home runs, 40 RBI and 46 runs scored. Phipps was unsuccessful with Caribes in the playoffs, aside from his three home runs and 12 RBI. He later played the league's finals with the Cardenales de Lara, but lost to Águilas del Zulia in the championship. Phipps was also chosen to play the 2017 Caribbean Series with Zulia.

On April 20, 2017, Phipps re–signed with Laredo for his fourth season with the team. However, on May 8, Phipps became a free agent when the Lemurs folded.

=== Texas AirHogs ===
On May 17, 2017, Phipps signed with the Texas AirHogs of the American Association of Independent Professional Baseball, finishing the season having played in 86 games with 18 doubles and a team–leading .314 average, 10 home runs and 58 runs batted in. He later began the offseason with Anzoátegui, but was released in early November 2017 after hitting .123, and later returned to the Nicaraguan league with the Gigantes de Rivas.

=== Sugar Land Skeeters ===
On January 16, 2018, Phipps was traded to the Sugar Land Skeeters of the Atlantic League of Professional Baseball, and officially signed with the team on May 14. In 98 games for the Skeeters, he hit .265/.344/.396 with nine home runs, 37 RBI, and six stolen bases. Phipps became a free agent following the season. That offseason, Phipps helped the Gigantes de Rivas reach the Nicaraguan league final series, but they lost to the Tigres de Chinandega 2–3.

On April 15, 2019, Phipps re-signed with Sugar Land, ultimately playing in 124 games and slashing .261/.350/.458 with 21 home runs and 81 RBI. He became a free agent following the season. Phipps later returned to play for the Caribes de Anzoátegui of the Venezuelan Professional Baseball League during the offseason.

On January 17, 2020, Phipps re-signed with the Skeeters for a third consecutive year. He did not play in a game for Sugar Land due to the cancellation of the Atlantic League season because of the COVID-19 pandemic. Phipps became a free agent in the offseason.

=== Tri-City ValleyCats ===
On February 24, 2021, Phipps signed with the Tri-City ValleyCats of the Frontier League. In 93 games, Phipps slashed .277/.354/.524 with 21 home runs and 62 RBI. He became a free agent following the season.

=== Lexington Legends ===
On September 18, 2021, Phipps signed with the Lexington Legends of the Atlantic League of Professional Baseball. In 21 games for the Legends, he batted .275/.344/.375 with two home runs, seven RBI, and four stolen bases. Phipps became a free agent after the season.

=== Tri-City ValleyCats (second stint) ===
On November 21, 2021, Phipps re-signed with the Tri-City ValleyCats of the Frontier League for the 2022 season. After slashing .296/.398/.648 33 home runs, 91 RBI, and 10 stolen bases, Phipps was awarded the Frontier League's Designated Hitter of the Year honors for 2022.

It was announced on January 30, 2023, that Phipps would return to the ValleyCats for the 2023 season. However, on March 3, Phipps was traded to the Charleston Dirty Birds of the Atlantic League of Professional Baseball. He did not play professionally in 2023, and became a free agent after the season.

== See also ==
- List of Major League Baseball players with a home run in their final major league at bat
