= Will Kincanon =

American baseball player (born 1995)

Gary SouthShore RailCats
- Pitcher
- Born: October 27, 1995 (age 31); Berwyn, Illinois, U.S.
- Bats: Right Throws: Right

William Anthony Kincanon (born October 27, 1995) is an American professional baseball pitcher for the Gary SouthShore RailCats of the American Association of Professional Baseball.

== Career ==
=== Amateur ===
Kincanon attended Riverside Brookfield High School in Riverside, Illinois, where he played baseball and basketball. In 2014, his senior year, he went 9–3 with a 0.91 ERA alongside batting .486. After graduating from high school, he played two seasons of college baseball at Triton College in River Grove, Illinois. After his sophomore year in 2016, he was selected by the Los Angeles Dodgers in the 29th round of the 2016 Major League Baseball draft, but did not sign and instead transferred to Indiana State University. As a junior at Indiana State, he started 14 games in which he compiled a 5–5 record and a 5.24 ERA over 79 innings.

=== Chicago White Sox ===
Kincanon was drafted by the Chicago White Sox in the 11th round, with the 327th overall selection, of the 2017 Major League Baseball draft.

Kincanon signed with the White Sox and made his professional debut that year with the Great Falls Voyagers of the Rookie Advanced Pioneer League, going 2–1 with a 3.94 ERA over 21 relief appearances. He spent 2018 with the Kannapolis Intimidators of the Single–A South Atlantic League where he went 3–1 with a 3.63 ERA over 26 games out of the bullpen, and 2019 with the Winston-Salem Dash of the High–A Carolina League where he pitched to a 3–3 record and a 1.86 ERA over 58 relief innings, striking out 71, earning All-Star honors. He did not play a minor league game in 2020 due to the cancellation of the minor league season because of the COVID-19 pandemic.

To begin the 2021 season, he was assigned to the Birmingham Barons of the Double-A South. After pitching four innings, he was placed on the injured list, and missed the remainder of the year. Prior to the start of the 2022 season, he underwent Tommy John surgery. He returned to action in 2023, making 4 starts split between High–A Winston-Salem and the rookie–level Arizona Complex League White Sox; he struggled to a 27.00 ERA with three strikeouts in 2 2/3 innings pitched. On June 24, 2023, Kincanon was released by the White Sox organization.

=== Chicago Dogs ===
On March 14, 2025, Kincanon signed with the Chicago Dogs of the American Association of Professional Baseball. In six appearances for the Dogs, he struggled to an 0-1 record and 6.75 ERA with five strikeouts across 5 1/3 innings pitched. Kincanon was released by Chicago on June 19.

=== Gary SouthShore RailCats ===
On July 29, 2026, Kincanon signed with the Gary SouthShore RailCats of the American Association of Professional Baseball.
