= Gary SouthShore RailCats =

Minor league baseball team in Gary, Indiana

Logo	Cap insignia

Information
- League: American Association of Professional Baseball (2011–present) (East Division)
- Location: Gary, Indiana
- Ballpark: U.S. Steel Yard
- Founded: 2001
- League championships: 3: 2005; 2007; 2013
- Division championships: 4: 2006; 2007; 2009; 2018
- Former league: Northern League (2002–2010)
- Colors: Green, maroon
- Retired numbers: 42, 45, 23, 27
- Ownership: Joseph Eng
- General manager: Anthony Giammanco
- Manager: Jeff Isom
- Media: WEFM 95.9; Post-Tribune; The Times of Northwest Indiana
- Website: railcatsbaseball.com

The Gary SouthShore RailCats are a professional baseball team based in Gary, Indiana, in the United States. The RailCats are members of the American Association of Professional Baseball, an official Partner League of Major League Baseball. The RailCats started as a member of the Northern League in 2002, operating as a travel team for a season before moving in to U.S. Steel Yard in 2003, where they have played since. In 2011, the team became a member of the modern American Association.

During their time in the Northern League, the RailCats were the only team to ever reach the championship series five years in a row (2005–2009). The RailCats won Northern League championships in 2005 and 2007, and the American Association championship in 2013.

== History ==
=== Inception (2001) ===
On January 23, 2001, the Northern League announced that it had awarded a franchise to Northwest Sports Ventures, LLC. In June, a limited liability company by the name of Victory Sports Group was officially registered in Missouri, led by Michael A. Tatoian. The city signed a fifteen-year lease with the team ownership for the future baseball stadium. In September 2001, the team was officially named the Gary SouthShore RailCats, drawing its name from both the city's deep history of freight lines and the South Shore Line commuter train (visible over the left field wall at the stadium).

=== Northern League (2002–2010) ===
With stadium construction behind schedule, the RailCats were forced to play their first season entirely on the road. The city of Gary paid a financial penalty for failure to complete the stadium on time, which helped finance their season. The RailCats traveled approximately 12,000 miles (19,000 km) to play 90 games. Despite this, the club won 35 games, the most ever by a team that played exclusively on the road, and RailCats manager Joe Calfapietra was named the Northern League Manager of the Year.

In 2002, the RailCats signed a ten-year naming rights agreement with United States Steel Corporation for the stadium. Joe Calfapietra resigned as manager citing that he wanted to be closer to home. The RailCats hired former major league All-Star Garry Templeton to manage the team. The RailCats were little more than a pushover, firmly stuck in last place.

Garry Templeton returned as coach for another season leading the Cats in their worst season in 2003. In June, they had a 14-game losing streak which was the longest in Northern League history. They completed the season in last place again securing the record for the most losses for a season in Northern League history. Templeton was not retained for the next season.

Before the 2005 season, the RailCats hired Greg Tagert as manager. Tagert made a number of roster changes, and turned the RailCats from losers to winners almost immediately, ending the first half with a .563 average, the first winning average in team history. The Northern League All-Star Game was held at U.S. Steel Yard. The second half went the same as the first but ended with an upset victory making the worst team in 2004, the 2005 champions. The RailCats beat the Fargo-Moorhead RedHawks to win the title.

Tagert returned as manager in 2006. The Cats were first in their division, second overall for the season. They returned to the championship series to face the RedHawks again. This time losing the title.

Tagert returned for the 2007 season. He proved that he could make the RailCats a legacy team. The RailCats appeared unstoppable all season. Winning first place both halves. The RailCats made it to the championship series against the Calgary Vipers and won their second league title.

Prior to the 2008 season, the Cats signed Tagert to an extended contract to keep him at least until the completion of the 2010 season. Lawyer Patrick A. Salvi and his wife, Lindy, purchased the RailCats. The league contracted to six teams. Due to the size, the league opted to have a single-division full season. Tagert again led the Cats in a winning season, ending in second place. They lost the championship series to the fourth-place Kansas City T-Bones, who beat the first place RedHawks in the playoffs to make it to the series.

The Cats ended the 2009 season in first place, yet again, and made it to the championship season for the fifth-straight season, but lost to the RedHawks.

The 2010 Cats finished in fourth place in the Northern League, their worst place finish in five years. For the first time since 2004, the RailCats did not reach the championship series, being swept by the RedHawks in the league semifinals.

=== American Association (2011–present) ===
On October 13, 2010, the RailCats left the Northern League, along with the RedHawks, T-Bones, and the Winnipeg Goldeyes to join the American Association for the 2011 season.

In 2020, the RailCats were not selected as one of six teams to participate in a condensed American Association season as a result of the COVID-19 pandemic. They went on hiatus for the 2020 season, and returned to play in 2021.

After finishing in last place in the North Division with a 39–61 record in 2021, Greg Tagert left the organization after 17 years to join the San Francisco Giants organization.

Lamar Rogers became the manager of the RailCats beginning with the 2022 season.

Jeff Isom took over as the manager of the RailCats on July 19, 2025, at which time the team had a 19 - 44 record. The team's performance improved and had a 19 - 18 record to close out the season, but still failed to qualify for the playoffs.

== Season-by-season records ==
		First Half		Second Half		Overall
Season	League	Division	W–L	Finish	W–L	Finish	W–L	Win%	Playoffs
2002	NL	South	16–28	5th	18–27	3rd	35–55	.389	Did not qualify
2003	NL	East	15–30	5th	21–24	5th	36–54	.400	Did not qualify
2004	NL	South	13–35	5th	18–30	5th	31–65	.323	Did not qualify
2005	NL	South	27–21	3rd	27–21	3rd	54–42	.563	Won championship
2006	NL	South	24–24	2nd	27–22	1st	51–46	.526	Lost championship
2007	NL	South	30–18	1st	28–20	1st	58–38	.604	Won championship
2008	NL	N/A	56–40	2nd	N/A	N/A	56–40	.583	Lost championship
2009	NL	N/A	57–39	1st	N/A	N/A	57–39	.594	Lost championship
2010	NL	N/A	52–48	4th	N/A	N/A	52–48	.520	Lost in 1st round
2011	AA	Central				2nd	54–46	.540	Did not qualify
2012	AA	Central				3rd	50–50	.500	Did not qualify
2013	AA	Central				2nd	58–41	.586	Won championship
2014	AA	Central				2nd	53–47	.530	Did not qualify
2015	AA	Central				3rd	45–55	.450	Did not qualify
2016	AA	Central				2nd	52–48	.520	Did not qualify
2017	AA	Central				2nd	57–43	.570	Lost first round
2018	AA	North				1st	59–41	.590	Lost first round
2019	AA	North				5th	40–59	.404	Did not qualify
2020	AA								Did not play due to COVID-19
2021	AA	North				6th	39–61	.390	Did not qualify
2022	AA	East				5th	42-58	.420	Did not qualify
2023	AA	East				6th	41–58	.414	Did not qualify
2024	AA	East				6th	30-70	.300	Did not qualify
2025	AA	East				6th	38–62	.380	Did not qualify
2026	AA	East				5th	42-57	.424	Did not qualify

== Playoffs ==
- 2005 season: Defeated St. Paul 3–2 in semifinals; defeated Fargo-Moorhead 3–2 to win championship
- 2006 season: Defeated Schaumburg 3–2 in semifinals; lost to Fargo-Moorhead 3–1 in championship
- 2007 season: Defeated Winnipeg 3–2 in semifinals; defeated Calgary 3–2 to win championship
- 2008 season: Defeated Winnipeg 3–1 in semifinals; lost to Kansas City 3–1 in championship
- 2009 season: Defeated Kansas City 3–2 in semifinals; lost to Fargo-Moorhead 3–1 in championship
- 2010 season: Lost to Fargo-Moorhead 3–0 in semifinals
- 2013 season: Defeated Fargo-Moorhead 3–1 in semifinals; defeated Wichita 3–1 to win championship
- 2017 season: Lost to Wichita 3–0 in semifinals
- 2018 season: Lost to St. Paul 3–1 in semifinals

== Roster ==
Gary SouthShore RailCats roster
Active roster	Coaching staff
Pitchers: 38 Dawson Lane; 44 Denson Hull; 19 Denyi Olivero; 48 Dominic Cancellieri; 49 Frank Plesac; 47 Jacob Coates; 6 Jake Hoover; 17 Matt Reitz; 10 Peyton Long; 33 Will Kincanon; 50 Zach Plesac; Catchers: 11 Ryan Leitch; 0 Pedro Revilla; 0 Justin O'Conner; Infielders: 5 Nick Podkul; 7 Andy Nelson; 8 Colin Summerhill; 22 Elvis Peralta; 53 Joe Suozzi; 52 Marc Flores; Outfielders: 34 Frank Podkul; 29 Kevin Watson Jr; 1 Korry Howell; 34 Carlos Machado	Manager: 1 Lamarr Rogers; Coaches: 28 Jason Charbonneau (coach); Adam Gibson (trainer); Darren Kent (clubhouse manager); 35 Ramon Ortiz (hitting); Brandon Osika (clubhouse manager); 16 Kent Willis (pitching); Disabled list; ‡ Inactive list; § Suspended list; Roster updated August 18, 2026 Transactions

== Notable alumni ==
- Bubba Carpenter (2002–2003)
- Howard Battle (2003)
- Tim Byrdak (2003)
- Wes Chamberlain (2003)
- Luis Urueta (2003)
- Trey Beamon (2004)
- Anthony Iapoce (2004–2005)
- Ben Risinger (2005)
- Tim Sauter (2005)
- Nathan Haynes (2006)
- Chris Curry (2006)
- Jermaine Allensworth (2006–2007)
- Jarrod Patterson (2007)
- Jim Crowell (2007)
- Tony Cogan (2007–2009)
- Brad Voyles (2008)
- PJ Bevis (2008)
- Koichi Misawa (2008)
- Onan Masaoka (2009)
- Brad Halsey (2010)
- Randall Simon (2010)
- Zach McClellan (2010)
- Rico Washington (2011–2012)
- Tomochika Tsuboi (2012)
- Clay Zavada (2013)
- James Parr (2014)
- Jonathan Jones (2015)
- Adron Chambers (2016)
- Karl Triana (2016)
- Masato Fukae (2016)
- Jorge de León (2016–2018)
- Ryan Fitzgerald (2017)
- Mitch Glasser (2018)
- Yasutomo Kubo (2018)
- Evan Marzilli (2019)
- Franklin Pérez (2024–present)
- Carlos Sanabria (2024–present)
- Ethan Hankins (2024–present)

== Retired numbers ==
Jackie Robinson	Joe Gates	Willie Glen	Greg Tagert
2B; Retired throughout professional baseball on April 15, 1997	1B Coach; Retired by the Gary SouthShore RailCats on May 21, 2010	P Retired by the Gary SouthShore RailCats on May 5, 2014	Manager; Retired by the Gary SouthShore RailCats on May 13, 2023

Achievements
Preceded by St. Paul Saints; 2004	Northern League champions Gary SouthShore RailCats; 2005	Succeeded by Fargo-Moorhead RedHawks; 2006
Preceded by Fargo-Moorhead RedHawks; 2006	Northern League champions Gary SouthShore RailCats; 2007	Succeeded by Kansas City T-Bones; 2008
