= Karl Triana =

Colombian baseball player (born 1992)

- Pitcher
- Born: October 7, 1992 (age 33); Cartagena, Colombia
- Bats: Right Throws: Right
- Stats at Baseball Reference

Karl Lewis Triana (born October 7, 1992) is a Colombian former professional baseball pitcher.

== Career ==
=== Arizona Diamondbacks ===
Triana pitched for the Missoula Osprey of the Rookie-level Pioneer League in 2012. He was promoted to the Hillsboro Hops of the Low–A Northwest League for the 2013 season, but struggled, and was demoted to Missoula.

=== Gary SouthShore RailCats ===
In 2016, Triana pitched for the Gary SouthShore RailCats of the American Association of Professional Baseball. During the season, he threw a no-hitter and set the franchise single-season record for strikeouts.

=== Baltimore Orioles ===
On April 5, 2017, Triana signed a minor league contract with the Baltimore Orioles organization. He spent the year with the High–A Frederick Keys, where he made 10 appearances and registered a 5.95 ERA with 22 strikeouts in 19 2/3 innings pitched. Triana elected free agency following the season on November 10.

== International career ==
Triana played for the Colombian national baseball team in the 2017 World Baseball Classic. For the 2017 season, Triana played for the Québec Capitales of the Canadian-American Association of Professional Baseball.
