= Clough Harbour =

US-based engineering consulting and construction management firm

CHA Consulting, Inc.
- Formerly: Clough, Harbour and Associates, LLP
- Type: Limited liability partnership (Private)
- Founded: 1952
- Headquarters: 575 Broadway, Albany, New York 12207
- Number of locations: 43 (Includes Subsidiaries as of 2022)
- Key people: Jim Stephenson, CEO
- Services: Consulting Engineering, Project Management, Construction Management
- Revenue: $320 million (2021)
- Number of employees: 1300 (Includes Subsidiaries as of 2021)
- Subsidiaries: American Fire Protection Inc. (Affiliate)

CHA Consulting, Inc. (previously known as Clough, Harbour & Associates LLP) is an international engineering consulting and construction management firm headquartered in Albany, New York. The firm was founded in 1952 by John Clarkeson, P.E., in Boston, Massachusetts, and focused on civil design work. The firm was subsequently purchased by Ronald Clough and renamed Clough & Associates. Ronald Clough then partnered with Bill Harbour and the firm was renamed Clough, Harbour & Associates, LLP.

Some of the firm’s first notable projects were its work on Boston’s "Inner Belt" highway and the Interstate Highways throughout the Northeast.

CHA has grown substantially since then and now has a large presence in several different engineering fields, including power supply and distribution, communications infrastructure, structural, electrical, mechanical, environmental, geotechnical, civil, aviation, rail, and traffic/transportation engineering, as well as landscape architecture, land use planning, surveying, sports and recreation, wetland delineation, construction engineering and technology services.

In 2020, Engineering News-Record, a publication which ranks design firms based on information about their revenue, ranked CHA as the 61st largest engineering design firm in the United States.

CHA Consulting and its subsidiary companies were sold in 2018 to First Reserve, a private equity firm that focuses on the acquisition of internationally-based energy companies.

== Notable projects ==
In the Albany, New York area, CHA has engineered some large scale projects, including the Times Union Center, the Joseph L. Bruno Stadium, the Albany Pedestrian Walkway, the expansive Colonie Town Park, and the Albany Capital Center.

=== Rensselaer Station and Albany Track Enhancements ===
CHA Consulting designed the $50 million project including renovations and improvements to the Albany–Rensselaer station, which included the addition of a fourth track. Furthermore, improvements to the train tracks between Albany, New York, and Schenectady, New York, are currently ongoing, a project which received the 2018 ACEC Gold Award for Excellence in Engineering.
