= Greg Tagert =

American baseball manager (born 1963)

Tri-City ValleyCats – No. 37
- Manager
- Born: January 5, 1963 (age 62); Vacaville, California, U.S.
- Bats: Right Throws: Right

Greg Tagert (born January 5, 1963) is an American professional baseball coach who is currently the manager for the Tri-City ValleyCats of the Frontier League. He's most notable as manager for the Gary SouthShore RailCats of the American Association of Professional Baseball, a position he held from 2005 until leaving on February 7, 2022, to join the San Francisco Giants organization.

== Career ==
Tagert, a native of Vacaville, California, attended San Francisco State University where he served as a pitcher. He went on to coach at the University of New Mexico and later served as a scout for the Detroit Tigers.

He managed nine years for five different clubs in the Frontier League. After his first year in the Frontier League, he had a very short stint in the Prairie League as manager for the Brainerd Bobcats, a team that folded after two weeks. By the end of the 2004 season, Tagert had amassed a Frontier League-record 412 victories (he ranks seventh as of the end of 2024).

In 2005, he became the new manager of the Gary SouthShore RailCats, a team that held the league record for losses. That same year, the RailCats won the Northern League championship. The RailCats made it to the Championship series four years in a row, winning twice. In 2008, the RailCats extended his contract until 2010. As a result, Tagert relocated his family from Vacaville to Northwest Indiana.

On Saturday, February 20, 2010, the RailCats announced that his contract was being extended until 2013. A year later, in 2011, the Northern League folded and the RailCats, along with the Kansas City T-Bones, Fargo-Moorhead RedHawks, and Winnipeg Goldeyes, moved to the American Association for the 2011 season. Tagert guided Gary to their first AA championship in 2013.

After suffering the first full losing season of his career in 2015, Tagert rebounded to guide the RailCats back to the postseason in 2017, followed by the first division title since 2008 (when they were in the Northern League). Both seasons ended in first-round playoff exits.

Gary slipped to fifth place (out of six teams) in the North Division in 2019 before sitting out the 2020 season due to the COVID-19 pandemic. Upon returning in 2021, the RailCats slipped further, suffering their first last-place finish under Tagert's watch. This proved to be his final season in a RailCats uniform.

On February 7, 2022, the RailCats announced that Tagert was leaving the organization to take a position within the San Francisco Giants organization, ending his 17-year tenure in Gary. Tagert has been tapped as the manager of the Arizona Complex League Giants.

On December 22, 2022, Tagert was announced as the new manager of the Winnipeg Goldeyes of the American Association of Professional Baseball, replacing long-time manager Rick Forney.

On December 11, 2023, he was announced as the new manager of the Tri-City ValleyCats of the Frontier League, marking his return to the league after two decades managing elsewhere. Tagert led the ValleyCats to the Frontier League playoffs in 2024, their first postseason appearance since joining the league three years prior.

== Records and awards ==
- Frontier League
  - Most career wins (former, now ranks 7th)
  - Manager of the Year (2001)
- Northern League
  - Manager of the Year (2007, 2009)
  - League Champion (2005, 2007)
- American Association
  - League Champion (2013)

== Year-by-Year Managerial Record ==
Year	Team	League	Record	Finish	Playoffs
1995	Ohio Valley Redcoats	Frontier League	36-34	5th	Did not qualify
1996	Brainerd Bobcats	Prairie League	7-9	--	Team disbanded
1997	Evansville Otters	Frontier League	46-33	2nd	Lost League Finals
1998	Evansville Otters	Frontier League	43-36	4th	Lost in 1st round
1999	Evansville Otters	Frontier League	43-41	3rd	Lost in 1st round
2000	Evansville Otters	Frontier League	45-38	4th	Lost League Finals
2001	Dubois County Dragons	Frontier League	48-36	3rd	Lost in 1st round
2002	Dubois County Dragons	Frontier League	52-32	3rd	Lost in 1st round
2003	Kenosha Mammoths	Frontier League	47-42	7th	Did not qualify
2004	Springfield/Ozark Ducks	Frontier League	52-44	6th	Did not qualify
2005	Gary SouthShore RailCats	Northern League	54-42	3rd	League Champs
2006	Gary SouthShore RailCats	Northern League	51-46	3rd	Lost League Finals
2007	Gary SouthShore RailCats	Northern League	58-38	1st	League Champs
2008	Gary SouthShore RailCats	Northern League	56-40	2nd	Lost League Finals
2009	Gary SouthShore RailCats	Northern League	57-39	1st	Lost League Finals
2010	Gary SouthShore RailCats	Northern League	52-48	4th	Lost in 1st round
2011	Gary SouthShore RailCats	American Association	54-46	2nd	Did not qualify
2012	Gary SouthShore RailCats	American Association	50-50	3rd	Did not qualify
2013	Gary SouthShore RailCats	American Association	58-41	2nd	League Champs
2014	Gary SouthShore RailCats	American Association	53-47	2nd	Did not qualify
2015	Gary SouthShore RailCats	American Association	45-55	3rd	Did not qualify
2016	Gary SouthShore RailCats	American Association	52-48	2nd	Did not qualify
2017	Gary SouthShore RailCats	American Association	57-43	2nd	Lost in 1st round
2018	Gary SouthShore RailCats	American Association	59-41	1st	Lost in 1st round
2019	Gary SouthShore RailCats	American Association	40-59	5th	Did not qualify
2021	Gary SouthShore RailCats	American Association	39-61	6th	Did not qualify
2022	ACL Giants Orange	Arizona Complex League	18-37	18th	Did not qualify
2023	Winnipeg Goldeyes	American Association	43-57	11th	Did not qualify
2024	Tri-City ValleyCats	Frontier League	53-41	4th	Lost in 1st round
29 Seasons Total			1368-1224		16 Appearances 3 Championships

Preceded by Garry Templeton	Manager of the Gary SouthShore RailCats; 2005 – 2021	Succeeded by Currently vacant
