= Jimmy Van Ostrand =

Canadian baseball player and coach

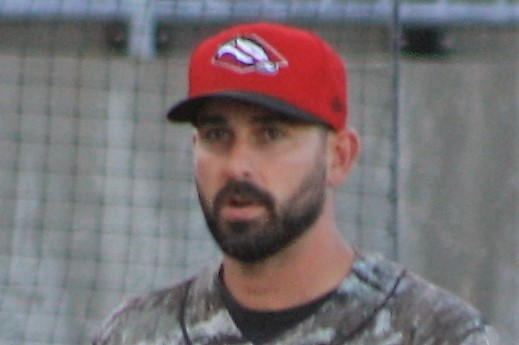
- Van Ostrand as a coach for the Arkansas Travelers in 2018
- Infielder / Coach
- Born: August 7, 1984 (age 42); Vancouver, British Columbia, Canada
- Bats: Right Throws: Right
- Stats at Baseball Reference
Medals
Men's baseball
Representing Canada
Baseball World Cup
Bronze medal – third place	2009 Nettuno	Team
Pan American Games
Gold medal – first place	2011 Guadalajara	Team

James O. Van Ostrand (born August 7, 1984) is a Canadian former professional baseball player and current Mental Skills Coach for the Toronto Blue Jays. Van Ostrand competed for the Canadian national baseball team in numerous international competitions and is now on the staff at the University of Arizona.

== Career ==
Van Ostrand attended McMath Secondary School in Richmond, British Columbia. While in high school, Van Ostrand played for the North Delta Blue Jays of the British Columbia Premier Baseball League. He was drafted by the Pittsburgh Pirates in the 29th round (855th overall) of the 2003 MLB draft, but did not sign, choosing to attend Allan Hancock College. Van Ostrand transferred to California Polytechnic State University, where he played for the Cal Poly Mustangs baseball team. He was selected by the Houston Astros in the eighth round (249th overall) of the 2006 MLB draft.

Van Ostrand played for the Tri-City ValleyCats of the New York–Penn League in 2006, leading the team to the New York–Penn League Finals. Van Ostrand was named to the South Atlantic League All-Star team while playing for the Lexington Legends in 2007. That year, he was also named to the All-Star Futures Game. He was named to the Carolina League All-Star team while playing for the Salem Avalanche in 2008. He was promoted to the Double-A Corpus Christi Hooks of the Texas League in 2008. In 2012, he began playing for the Sugar Land Skeeters minor league team of the Atlantic League of Professional Baseball. On May 26, 2012, Van Ostrand signed with the Washington Nationals.

== International career ==
Van Ostrand played for the Canadian national baseball team in the 2007 and 2009 Baseball World Cup, winning the bronze medal in 2009. He also played for Team Canada in the 2008 Summer Olympics, finishing sixth, and in the 2011 Pan American Games, where Canada won the gold medal, Van Ostrand drove in both of Canada's runs with a two-out, two-run double in the gold medal-clinching victory over the United States national baseball team.

== Post-playing career ==
In 2014, Van Ostrand started to volunteer coach for the Boston College Eagles. As of 2016, he was the Director of Player Development for the University of Arizona.

He currently works for the Toronto Blue Jays as the mental skills coach. He previously worked for the Seattle Mariners.
