= Ryan Hartman (baseball) =

American baseball player (born 1994)

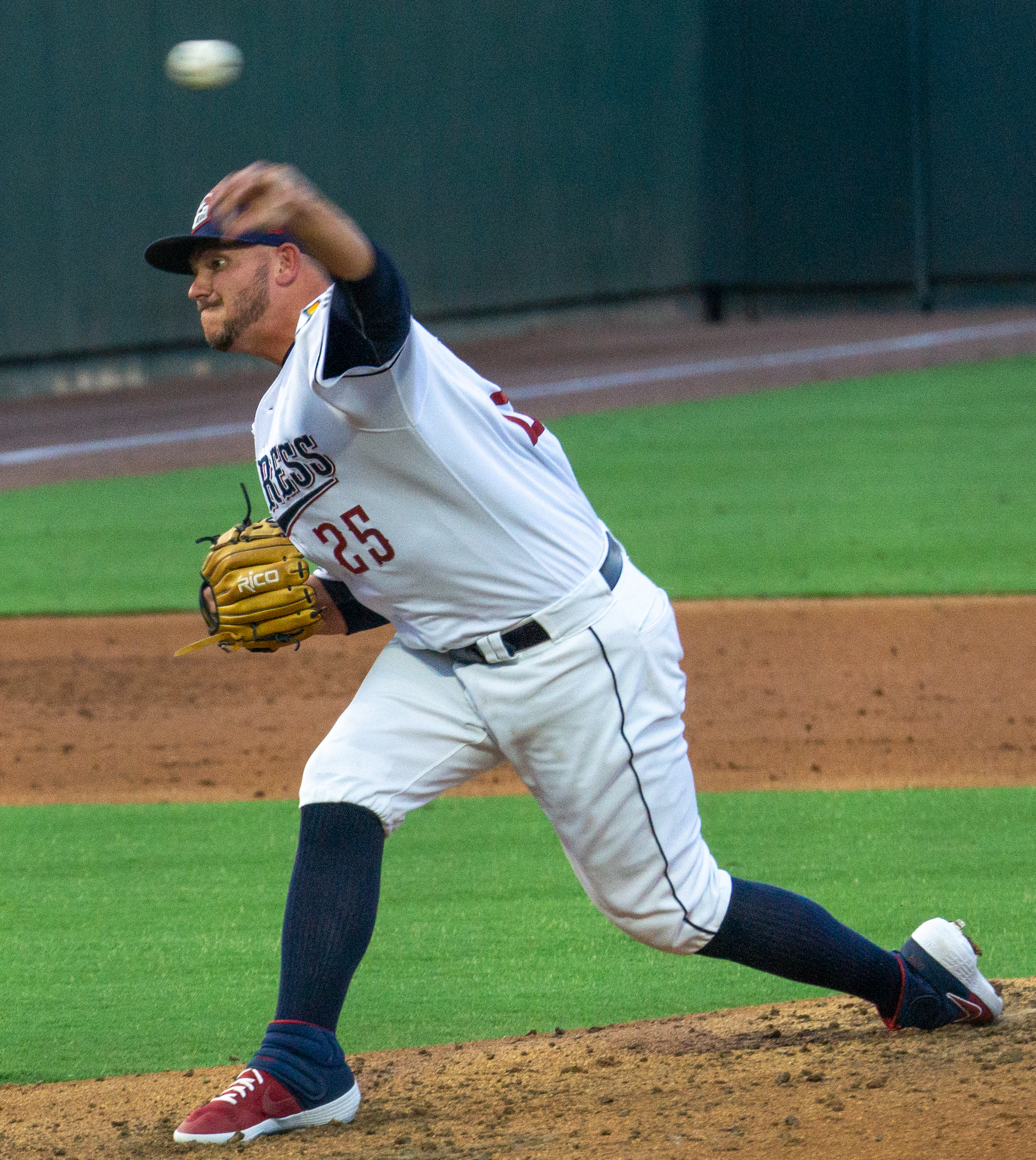
- Hartman with the Round Rock Express in 2019
- Pitcher
- Born: April 21, 1994 (age 32); Anaheim, California, U.S.
- Bats: Left Throws: Left

MLB debut
- June 30, 2021, for the Houston Astros

MLB statistics (through 2021 season)
- Win–loss record: 0–0
- Earned run average: 3.86
- Strikeouts: 2
- Stats at Baseball Reference

Teams
- Houston Astros (2021)

Ryan James Hartman (born April 21, 1994) is an American former professional baseball pitcher. He played in Major League Baseball (MLB) for the Houston Astros.

== Career ==
Hartman attended Cypress College, Lindsey Wilson College, and Tennessee Wesleyan University, helping lead Lindsey Wilson (2015) and Tennessee Wesleyan (2016) to the NAIA World Series.

=== Houston Astros ===
The Houston Astros selected him in the ninth round, 277th overall, of the 2016 MLB draft. He made his professional debut with the Tri-City ValleyCats, posting a 2.36 earned run average (ERA) in 14 appearances.

In 2017, Hartman split the season between the High-A Buies Creek Astros and the Single-A Quad Cities River Bandits, recording a cumulative 5–7 record and 3.64 ERA in 25 games between the two teams. The following year, Hartman pitched for the Double-A Corpus Christi Hooks, logging an 11–4 record and 2.69 ERA with 143 strikeouts in 120 2/3 innings pitched. In 2019, Hartman played for the Triple-A Round Rock Express, registering a 6–7 record and 5.84 ERA in 25 appearances.

Hartman did not play in a game in 2020 due to the cancellation of the minor league season because of the COVID-19 pandemic. He was assigned to the Triple-A Sugar Land Skeeters to begin the 2021 season, where he recorded a 2–2 record and 3.98 ERA with 49 strikeouts in 40 2/3 innings pitched.

On June 30, 2021, Hartman was selected to the 40-man roster and promoted to the major leagues for the first time. He made his MLB debut that day, pitching in relief against the Baltimore Orioles. In the game, he notched his first career strikeout, against Orioles infielder Ryan Mountcastle. The Astros designated Hartman for assignment on July 25.

=== Baltimore Orioles ===
On July 30, 2021, the Baltimore Orioles claimed Hartman off waivers, following the trade of Shawn Armstrong. He was assigned to the Triple-A Norfolk Tides. On August 18, Hartman was designated for assignment by the Orioles. On August 20, Hartman cleared waivers and was assigned outright to Triple-A Norfolk. In 2022, Hartman split time between Norfolk, the Double-A Bowie Baysox, and the High-A Aberdeen IronBirds before he was released by the Orioles on August 6, 2022.

=== Tri-City ValleyCats ===
On August 15, 2022, Hartman signed with the Tri-City ValleyCats of the Frontier League. In 3 games, Hartman struggled to an 0–2 record and 6.75 ERA with 16 strikeouts in 12 innings pitched.

=== Lake Country DockHounds ===
On March 29, 2023, Hartman was traded to the Lake Country DockHounds of the American Association of Professional Baseball in exchange for a player to be named later. He made 5 appearances (2 starts) for Lake Country, logging a 4.34 ERA with 14 strikeouts in 18 2/3 innings pitched.

=== Staten Island FerryHawks ===
On June 5, 2023, Hartman was traded to the Staten Island FerryHawks of the Atlantic League of Professional Baseball in exchange for Cristian Santana.
