= Aaron Altherr =

German-American baseball player (born 1991)

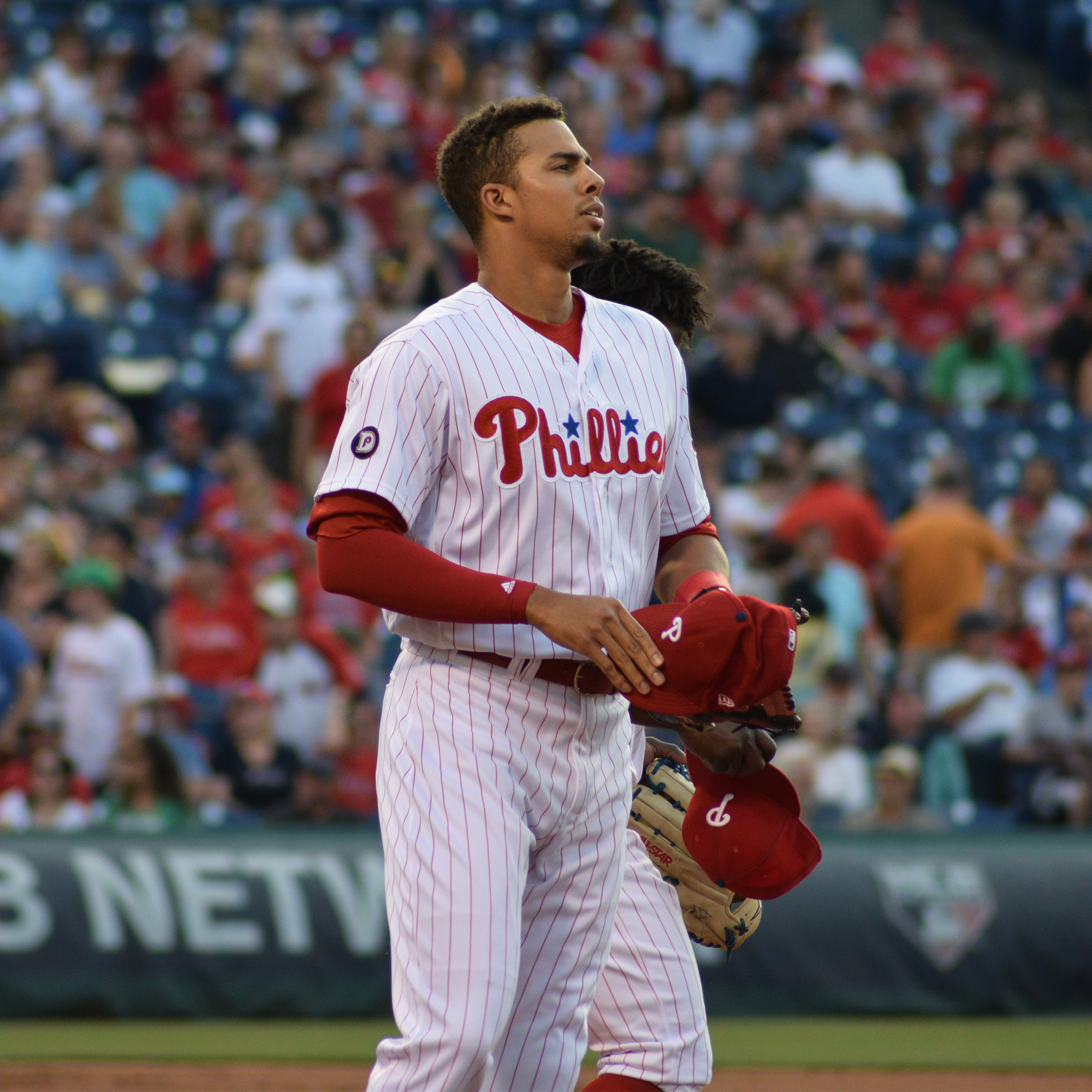
- Altherr with the Phillies in 2017

Chicago Dogs – No. 34
- Outfielder
- Born: January 14, 1991 (age 35); Landstuhl, Germany
- Bats: Right Throws: Right

Professional debut
- MLB: June 16, 2014, for the Philadelphia Phillies
- KBO: May 5, 2020, for the NC Dinos

MLB statistics (through 2019 season)
- Batting average: .219
- Home runs: 37
- Runs batted in: 150

KBO statistics (through 2021 season)
- Batting average: .275
- Home runs: 63
- Runs batted in: 192
- Stats at Baseball Reference

Teams
- Philadelphia Phillies (2014–2019); San Francisco Giants (2019); New York Mets (2019); NC Dinos (2020–2021)

Career highlights and awards
- Korean Series champion (2020)

Aaron Samuel Altherr (/ɑːlˈtɛər/ ahl-TAIR; born January 14, 1991) is a German-American professional baseball outfielder for the Chicago Dogs of the American Association of Professional Baseball. He was drafted by the Philadelphia Phillies in the ninth round of the 2009 Major League Baseball draft. Altherr has played in Major League Baseball (MLB) for the Phillies, San Francisco Giants, and New York Mets. He has also played in the KBO League for the NC Dinos.

== Early life ==
Altherr was born in Germany, where his mother, Michelle, a member of the United States Air Force, was stationed. His father, Frank, is German and played twice in 2. Bundesliga for FC Homburg. Altherr grew up moving frequently, spending time in Kansas City and Arizona.

== Career ==
=== Philadelphia Phillies ===
==== 2009–2012 ====
Altherr was drafted by the Philadelphia Phillies in the ninth round of the 2009 Major League Baseball draft out of Agua Fria High School in Avondale, Arizona. The Phillies pried him away from a commitment to the University of Arizona with a $150,000 signing bonus. Being a multi-sport athlete in high school and leading Agua Fria High School to the 4A state championship in 2008 he also received NCAA Division I scholarship offers for basketball. He was assigned to the GCL Phillies, where in 28 games to finish 2009, he hit .214 with 1 HR and 11 RBI.

Altherr began 2010 back with the GCL team, where in 27 games, he hit .304 with 15 RBI and 10 SB, but he struck out 22 times to just 3 walks. He earned a promotion to Short-Season Williamsport on July 22. In 28 games with Crosscutters, he hit .287 with 10 RBI, and just 13 strikeouts to 8 walks. After the season, he was rated the Phillies 10th best prospect by Baseball America. Altherr began 2011 with Single-A Lakewood, but he hit poorly, hitting just .211 with 15 RBI and 12 SB in 41 games. By the time the New York–Penn League began in 2011, he was back with Williamsport, but he understood the demotion and worked to regain his confidence. He was an All-Star in 2011, and in 71 games with Williamsport, he hit .260 with 5 HR, 31 RBI, and 25 SB.

Altherr was given a second shot at Lakewood, and in 110 games, he hit .252 with 8 HR, 50 RBI, and 25 SB. He played mostly left field up to 2012, but he was used mostly at center field with Lakewood. He played 2013 with High-A Clearwater, where in 123 games, he hit .275 with 12 HR, 69 RBI and 23 SB, but he struck out 140 times.

==== 2013–2015 ====
Altherr played for the Germany national baseball team in the qualifying rounds for the 2013 World Baseball Classic. He played in the Arizona Fall League during the offseason in 2013. He was added to the Phillies 40-man roster on November 20, 2013. He played in the Arizona Fall League in 2013 with the Peoria Javelinas. In 12 games, he hit 9–45 (.200) with 3 RBI, 2 SB and 3 2B.

Altherr was set to begin 2014 with Double-A Reading, but he was sent to Clearwater before playing a game with Reading on April 13. However, after 7 games, he was quickly promoted back to Reading. He was hitting .245 in 52 games with 4 HR and 23 RBI, including hitting .417 with 9 RBI in his last 12 games, before he was promoted to Philadelphia.

On June 16, 2014, Altherr was recalled to Philadelphia to replace outfielder Tony Gwynn Jr., who was placed on the bereavement list following the death of his father, Tony Gwynn. He made his major league debut that night, appearing as a pinch-hitter in the 12th inning against the Atlanta Braves. He flied out to center field, and was replaced by pitcher Antonio Bastardo in the lineup. He was optioned back to Reading on June 19.

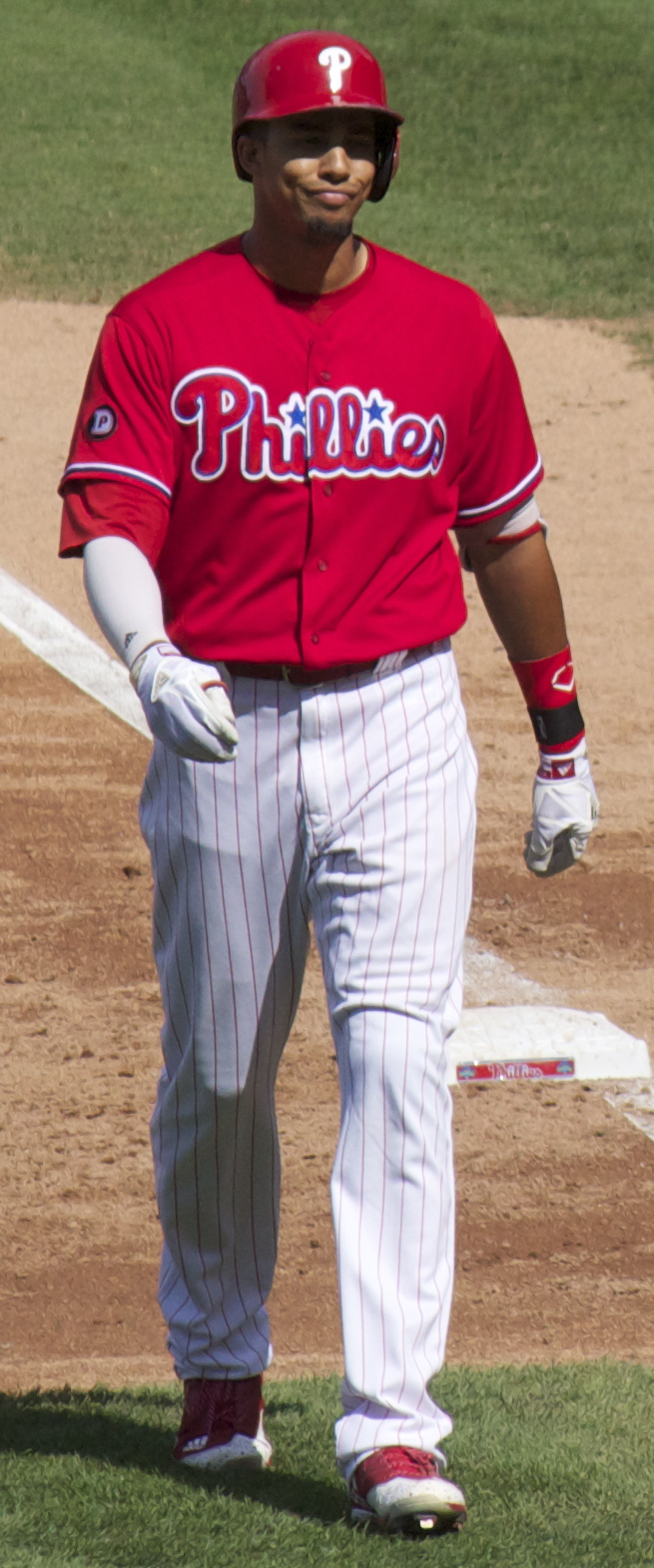

After splitting the first four months of 2015 season between Reading and the Triple-A Lehigh Valley IronPigs, he was recalled to Philadelphia on August 18. The following day, he recorded his first Major League hit, an RBI double against Mark Buehrle of the Toronto Blue Jays. He hit his first major league home run that same game against reliever Bo Schultz. On September 25, Altherr hit an inside-the-park grand slam off Jordan Zimmermann in an 8–2 win over the Washington Nationals, driving in Brian Bogusevic, Cameron Rupp, and Jerad Eickhoff. The grand slam was the 225th inside-the-park grand slam in Major League history, and the first since Randy Winn did so for the Tampa Bay Devil Rays in a 6–2 win over the New York Yankees on October 3, 1999. Altherr hit a second home run in the fifth inning of the game, becoming the first player to record a multi-home run game including an inside-the-park grand slam since Bob Brower of the Texas Rangers did so in a 13–3 win over the Oakland Athletics on June 21, 1987.

==== 2016–2019 ====
During spring training in 2016, Altherr tore a ligament in his left wrist, requiring surgery that caused him to miss the first half of the season. He was activated from the disabled list on July 28.

On September 18, 2017, in a 4–3 win over the Los Angeles Dodgers, Altherr hit a grand slam, the first one ever given up by Clayton Kershaw, who was then making his 288th regular-season start, having pitched 1,917 innings in 10 seasons. In 2017, in 372 at bats, Altherr batted .272/.340/.516 with 19 home runs and 65 RBIs.

On July 22, 2018, Altherr was sent down to the Phillies Triple A Lehigh Valley Iron Pigs, but was brought back up in September. In 2018, he batted .181/.295/.333 for the Phillies with 8 home runs, 3 stolen bases, and 37 RBIs. He was tied for 4th in MLB with four extra-base-hits as a pinch-hitter.

On April 10, 2019, in the ninth inning of a game where the Washington Nationals were blowing out the Phillies 14–0, Altherr was called upon to pitch. He gave up one run and notched two strikeouts, with his fastball topping out at 90.5 mph. On May 4, 2019, Altherr was designated for assignment by the Phillies.

=== San Francisco Giants ===
On May 11, 2019, Altherr was claimed on waivers by the San Francisco Giants. After a single at-bat with the Giants, he was again designated for assignment on May 19.

=== New York Mets ===
The New York Mets claimed Altherr off of waivers on May 23, 2019. He homered in his first at-bat with the team, on May 25. His contract was purchased on July 27. Altherr was designated for assignment on August 24. In 31 at bats with the Mets he batted .129/.200/.258. He elected free agency on October 1.

=== NC Dinos ===
On November 22, 2019, Altherr signed a one-year contract with the NC Dinos of the KBO League. On January 1, 2021, Altherr re-signed with the Dinos on a one-year, $1.3MM contract. He slashed .272/.358/.514 with 32 home runs and 84 RBIs over 143 games. Altherr was not re-signed following the 2021 season and became a free agent.

=== Tri-City ValleyCats ===
On March 29, 2023, Altherr signed with the Tri-City ValleyCats of the Frontier League. In 82 games for the club, he batted .294/.385/.555 with 21 home runs, 70 RBI, and 8 stolen bases. On December 15, the ValleyCats declined their option on Altherr, making him a free agent.

=== Algodoneros de Unión Laguna ===
On March 19, 2024, Altherr signed with the Algodoneros de Unión Laguna of the Mexican League. On June 10, Altherr was deactivated by the club in order to be present for the birth of his second son. He was reactivated on July 25. In 45 games for the Algodoneros, Altherr hit .259/.412/.531 with nine home runs, 20 RBI, and four stolen bases. He became a free agent following the season.

=== Cleburne Railroaders ===
On March 14, 2025, Altherr signed with the Cleburne Railroaders of the American Association of Professional Baseball. In 96 appearances for the Railroaders, Altherr slashed .260/.336/.493 with 20 home runs, 76 RBI, and one stolen base. He became a free agent following the season.

=== Chicago Dogs ===
On March 16, 2026, Altherr signed with the Chicago Dogs of the American Association of Professional Baseball.

== International ==
Altherr played for the Germany national baseball team during the 2013 World Baseball Classic qualification.

== Personal life ==
Altherr was born in Landstuhl, Germany, where his mother, Michelle, a native of Baltimore, was stationed as a member of the United States Air Force. His father, Frank, was a German professional soccer player for FC Kaiserslautern.

On November 20, 2016, Aaron married his girlfriend, Samantha Chavez. Their son, Isaiah, was born in 2022.
