= 2013 World Baseball Classic =

International baseball competition in 2013

Tournament details
- Countries: Japan; Puerto Rico; Taiwan; United States
- Dates: March 2–19, 2013
- Teams: 16

Final positions
- Champions: Dominican Republic (1st title)
- Runners-up: Puerto Rico
- Third place: Japan
- Fourth place: Netherlands

Tournament statistics
- Games played: 39
- Attendance: 781,438 (20,037 per game)

Awards
- MVP: (Dominican Republic) Robinson Canó

The 2013 World Baseball Classic (WBC) was an international professional baseball competition, held from March 2 to 19, 2013. This was the third iteration of the WBC, following the two previous tournaments, held in 2006 and 2009.

Unlike the two previous WBCs, which consisted of the same 16 countries, only the 12 countries that won at least one game in the 2009 WBC were guaranteed a berth in the main tournament. The automatic qualifiers were Australia, China, Cuba, Dominican Republic, Italy, Japan, Mexico, the Netherlands, Puerto Rico, South Korea, the United States, and Venezuela. Four qualification brackets were held in late 2012 and respectively won by Canada, Taiwan, Spain, and Brazil, who joined the WBC as the final four teams (the latter two making their WBC debuts).

As in the 2006 tournament, the first round had a round-robin format, which led to South Korea being eliminated on a run difference tiebreaker. Venezuela also failed to advance out of a tough group. The fourth-place teams in each group – Brazil, Australia, Spain, and Mexico – had to participate in the qualifying round in order to return for the 2017 tournament.

The second round was a modified double-elimination format, as in the 2009 tournament, where the modification was that the final game of each bracket was winner-take-all, even if won by the team emerging from the loser's bracket, although that game only affected seeding as two teams advanced from each bracket. The Netherlands improved on its surprising 2009 run by advancing to the semifinal game, as did two-time defending champion Japan. However, Japan was eliminated in the semi-finals, losing to Puerto Rico. In the final game, the Dominican Republic defeated Puerto Rico to become the first WBC champion from the Western Hemisphere, as well as the first team to complete the WBC with an undefeated record, and the only one to do so until Japan also finished with a perfect record in the 2023 WBC. Robinson Canó of the Dominican Republic was named the Most Valuable Player of the tournament.

== Revenue-sharing dispute ==
The preparations for the third World Baseball Classic were complicated by a dispute between the Japanese Professional Baseball Players Association (JPBPA), the union for all Nippon Professional Baseball players, and MLB over revenue sharing. JPBPA demanded a larger share of advertising and merchandise sponsorship revenue for the tournament, a large chunk of which came from Japanese companies. MLB resisted the move in part due to the fact that the World Baseball Classic is a joint production of MLB and the MLB Player's Association, meaning that those two organizations bore the cost of the tournament.

In July 2012, the JPBPA voted unanimously to boycott the 2013 World Baseball Classic. The move was interpreted by some news outlets as a non-final decision, aimed at raising the pressure on MLB. In September 2012, Japanese players agreed to take part after reaching a compromise with tournament organizers on sharing sponsorship and licensing revenue.

== Qualification ==
The top three teams from each pool of the first round of the 2009 World Baseball Classic automatically qualified.

Team	World ranking	Method of qualification	Classic appearance	Previous best position
Australia	10th	2009 World Baseball Classic	3rd	First round (2006, 2009)
China	18th	2009 World Baseball Classic	3rd	First round (2006, 2009)
Cuba	1st	2009 World Baseball Classic	3rd	Runners-up (2006)
Dominican Republic	13th	2009 World Baseball Classic	3rd	Semifinals (2006)
Italy	9th	2009 World Baseball Classic	3rd	First round (2006, 2009)
Japan	3rd	2009 World Baseball Classic	3rd	Champions (2006, 2009)
Mexico	11th	2009 World Baseball Classic	3rd	Second round (2006, 2009)
Netherlands	7th	2009 World Baseball Classic	3rd	Second round (2009)
Puerto Rico	12th	2009 World Baseball Classic	3rd	Second round (2006, 2009)
South Korea	4th	2009 World Baseball Classic	3rd	Runners-up (2009)
United States	2nd	2009 World Baseball Classic	3rd	Semifinals (2009)
Venezuela	8th	2009 World Baseball Classic	3rd	Semifinals (2009)
Spain	16th	Qualifier 1	1st	—
Canada	6th	Qualifier 2	3rd	First round (2006, 2009)
Brazil	20th	Qualifier 3	1st	—
Chinese Taipei	5th	Qualifier 4	3rd	First round (2006, 2009)

== Format ==
In the first round, each team played the other three teams in its pool once. Teams were ranked by winning percentage in the first round, with the top two teams in each pool advancing to the second round. There, the teams from Pools A and B (in Pool 1) and the teams from Pools C and D (in Pool 2) competed in a double-elimination format.

The top two teams in each pool in the second round entered the four-team single-elimination semifinals. The four qualifying teams crossed over for the semifinals, with the winner of each pool playing against the runner-up from the other pool.

In the final, the team with the higher winning percentage of games in the tournament was the home team. If the teams competing in the final had identical winning percentages in the tournament, then World Baseball Classic, Inc. (WBCI) would conduct a coin flip or draw to determine the home team.

In the first round, ties were to be broken in the following order of priority:

1. The winner of head-to-head games between the tied teams;
2. The team with the highest Team's Quality Balance (TQB=(runs scored (RS)/innings batted (IPO))–(runs against (RA)/innings pitched (IPD))) in head-to-head games between the tied teams;
3. The team with the highest Earned Runs Team's Quality Balance (ER–TQB=(earned runs scored (ERS)/IPO)–(earned runs against (ERA)/IPD)) in head-to-head games between the tied teams;
4. The team with the highest batting average (AVG) in head-to-head games between the tied teams;
5. Drawing of lots, conducted by World Baseball Classic, Inc. (WBCI).

== Rosters ==
The deadline for submitting provisional rosters was January 16, but teams had until February 20 to finalize their roster decisions. Many Major League Baseball (MLB) players participated. The United States provisional roster was made up entirely of players from MLB, and champions Dominican Republic provisional roster had only one player not signed to an MLB team in 2013. The Canadian team had 12 players who appeared in MLB in 2012. Japan had none and two prominent Japanese MLB players, Yu Darvish and Ichiro Suzuki, chose not to play. Though five members who competed for the Cuban national team in the 2009 WBC had since defected, the Cuban team was considered strong despite its 2nd-round sacking. Three members of MLB.com's Top 100 prospect participated: Xander Bogaerts, Eddie Rosario, and Jameson Taillon.

== Venues ==
Eight stadiums were used during the main tournament:

Pool A	Pool B	Pool C	Pool D
Fukuoka, Japan	Taichung, Taiwan	San Juan, Puerto Rico	Phoenix, United States
Fukuoka Dome	Taichung Intercontinental Baseball Stadium	Hiram Bithorn Stadium	Chase Field
Capacity: 38,561	Capacity: 20,000	Capacity: 18,264	Capacity: 48,633

Pool D	Pool 1	Pool 2	Championship
Scottsdale, United States	Tokyo, Japan	Miami, United States	San Francisco, United States
Salt River Fields at Talking Stick	Tokyo Dome	Marlins Park	AT&T Park
Capacity: 11,000	Capacity: 42,000	Capacity: 36,742	Capacity: 41,915

== Pools composition ==
The top 12 teams that participated in the 2009 World Baseball Classic were invited back for the 2013 tournament. Spain, Canada, Brazil, and Chinese Taipei won their pools of qualification.

Note: Numbers in parentheses indicate positions in the WBSC World Rankings at the time of the tournament.

Pool A	Pool B	Pool C	Pool D
Japan (3)	South Korea (4)	Venezuela (8)	United States (2)
China (18)	Netherlands (7)	Puerto Rico (12)	Mexico (11)
Cuba (1)	Australia (10)	Dominican Republic (13)	Italy (9)
Brazil (20)	Chinese Taipei (5)	Spain (16)	Canada (6)

== First round ==
=== Pool A ===
Pos	Team	Pld	W	L	RF	RA	RD	PCT	GB	Qualification
1	Cuba	3	3	0	23	5	+18	1.000	—	Advance to second round Qualification for 2017 World Baseball Classic
2	Japan (H)	3	2	1	13	11	+2	.667	1	Advance to second round Qualification for 2017 World Baseball Classic
3	China	3	1	2	7	19	−12	.333	2	Qualification for 2017 World Baseball Classic
4	Brazil	3	0	3	7	15	−8	.000	3	

Rules for classification: Tiebreakers
(H) Hosts

Date	Local time	Road team	Score	Home team	Inn.	Venue	Game duration	Attendance	Boxscore
Mar 2, 2013	19:00	Japan	5–3	Brazil		Fukuoka Dome	3:20	28,181	Boxscore
Mar 3, 2013	12:30	Cuba	5–2	Brazil		Fukuoka Dome	3:22	4,003	Boxscore
Mar 3, 2013	19:00	China	2–5	Japan		Fukuoka Dome	2:57	13,891	Boxscore
Mar 4, 2013	16:30	China	0–12	Cuba	7	Fukuoka Dome	2:38	3,123	Boxscore
Mar 5, 2013	17:00	Brazil	2–5	China		Fukuoka Dome	3:12	3,110	Boxscore
Mar 6, 2013	19:00	Japan	3–6	Cuba		Fukuoka Dome	3:39	26,860	Boxscore

=== Pool B ===
Pos	Team	Pld	W	L	RF	RA	RD	PCT	GB	Qualification
1	Chinese Taipei (H)	3	2	1	14	7	+7	.667 (Note: Chinese Taipei 0.235 TQB, Netherlands 0.000 TQB, South Korea -0.235 TQB)	—	Advance to second round Qualification for 2017 World Baseball Classic
2	Netherlands	3	2	1	12	9	+3	.667	—	Advance to second round Qualification for 2017 World Baseball Classic
3	South Korea	3	2	1	9	7	+2	.667	—	Qualification for 2017 World Baseball Classic
4	Australia	3	0	3	2	14	−12	.000	2	

Rules for classification: Tiebreakers
(H) Hosts
Notes:

Date	Local time	Road team	Score	Home team	Inn.	Venue	Game duration	Attendance	Boxscore
Mar 2, 2013	12:30	Australia	1–4	Chinese Taipei		Intercontinental Baseball Stadium	2:53	20,035	Boxscore
Mar 2, 2013	19:30	South Korea	0–5	Netherlands		Intercontinental Baseball Stadium	3:24	1,085	Boxscore
Mar 3, 2013	14:30	Netherlands	3–8	Chinese Taipei		Intercontinental Baseball Stadium	3:09	22,689	Boxscore
Mar 4, 2013	18:30	South Korea	6–0	Australia		Intercontinental Baseball Stadium	3:31	1,481	Boxscore
Mar 5, 2013	12:30	Australia	1–4	Netherlands		Intercontinental Baseball Stadium	2:50	1,113	Boxscore
Mar 5, 2013	19:30	Chinese Taipei	2–3	South Korea		Intercontinental Baseball Stadium	3:27	23,431	Boxscore

=== Pool C ===
Pos	Team	Pld	W	L	RF	RA	RD	PCT	GB	Qualification
1	Dominican Republic	3	3	0	19	8	+11	1.000	—	Advance to second round Qualification for 2017 World Baseball Classic
2	Puerto Rico (H)	3	2	1	11	7	+4	.667	1	Advance to second round Qualification for 2017 World Baseball Classic
3	Venezuela	3	1	2	17	21	−4	.333	2	Qualification for 2017 World Baseball Classic
4	Spain	3	0	3	9	20	−11	.000	3	

Rules for classification: Tiebreakers
(H) Hosts

Date	Local time	Road team	Score	Home team	Inn.	Venue	Game duration	Attendance	Boxscore
Mar 7, 2013	19:30	Venezuela	3–9	Dominican Republic		Hiram Bithorn Stadium	3:55	15,055	Boxscore
Mar 8, 2013	18:30	Spain	0–3	Puerto Rico		Hiram Bithorn Stadium	3:05	14,974	Boxscore
Mar 9, 2013	12:00	Dominican Republic	6–3	Spain		Hiram Bithorn Stadium	3:47	13,421	Boxscore
Mar 9, 2013	18:30	Puerto Rico	6–3	Venezuela		Hiram Bithorn Stadium	3:35	18,800	Boxscore
Mar 10, 2013	12:30	Spain	6–11	Venezuela		Hiram Bithorn Stadium	3:59	13,395	Boxscore
Mar 10, 2013	19:30	Dominican Republic	4–2	Puerto Rico		Hiram Bithorn Stadium	3:41	19,413	Boxscore

=== Pool D ===
Pos	Team	Pld	W	L	RF	RA	RD	PCT	GB	Qualification
1	United States (H)	3	2	1	17	11	+6	.667 (Note: United States defeated Italy 6–2.)	—	Advance to second round Qualification for 2017 World Baseball Classic
2	Italy	3	2	1	22	15	+7	.667	—	Advance to second round Qualification for 2017 World Baseball Classic
3	Canada	3	1	2	18	26	−8	.333 (Note: Canada defeated Mexico 10–3.)	1	Qualification for 2017 World Baseball Classic
4	Mexico	3	1	2	13	18	−5	.333	1	

Rules for classification: Tiebreakers
(H) Hosts
Notes:

Date	Local time	Road team	Score	Home team	Inn.	Venue	Game duration	Attendance	Boxscore
Mar 7, 2013	13:00	Italy	6–5	Mexico		Salt River Fields at Talking Stick	3:41	4,478	Boxscore
Mar 8, 2013	12:00	Canada	4–14	Italy	8	Chase Field (Note: The game was originally scheduled to be played at Salt River Fields at Talking Stick, but was moved due to potential inclement weather.)	3:27	5,140	Boxscore
Mar 8, 2013	19:00	Mexico	5–2	United States		Chase Field	3:29	44,256	Boxscore
Mar 9, 2013	12:30	Canada	10–3	Mexico		Chase Field	3:44	19,581	Boxscore
Mar 9, 2013	19:00	United States	6–2	Italy		Chase Field	3:21	19,303	Boxscore
Mar 10, 2013	13:00	United States	9–4	Canada		Chase Field	3:18	22,425	Boxscore

== Second round ==
=== Pool 1 ===
Preliminaries
BR	Netherlands	6
AW	Cuba	2
AR	Japan	4
BW	Chinese Taipei	3
Lower round 1
L1	Cuba	14
L2	Chinese Taipei	0

Qualifiers
W1	Netherlands	4
W2	Japan	16
Lower final
W3	Cuba	6
L4	Netherlands	7

Seeding
W4	Japan	10
W5	Netherlands	6

Date	Local time	Road team	Score	Home team	Inn.	Venue	Game duration	Attendance	Boxscore
Mar 8, 2013	12:00	Netherlands	6–2	Cuba		Tokyo Dome	3:38	38,588	Boxscore
Mar 8, 2013	19:00	Japan	4–3	Chinese Taipei	10	Tokyo Dome	4:47	43,527	Boxscore
Mar 9, 2013	19:00	Chinese Taipei	0–14	Cuba	7	Tokyo Dome	2:43	12,884	Boxscore
Mar 10, 2013	19:00	Japan	16–4	Netherlands	7	Tokyo Dome	2:53	37,745	Boxscore
Mar 11, 2013	19:00	Cuba	6–7	Netherlands		Tokyo Dome	3:52	7,613	Boxscore
Mar 12, 2013	19:00	Netherlands	6–10	Japan		Tokyo Dome	3:30	30,301	Boxscore

=== Pool 2 ===
Preliminaries
DR	Italy	4
CW	Dominican Rep.	5
CR	Puerto Rico	1
DW	United States	7
Lower round 1
L1	Italy	3
L2	Puerto Rico	4

Qualifiers
W1	Dominican Rep.	3
W2	United States	1
Lower final
W3	Puerto Rico	4
L4	United States	3

Seeding
W4	Dominican Rep.	2
W5	Puerto Rico	0

Date	Local time	Road team	Score	Home team	Inn.	Venue	Game duration	Attendance	Boxscore
Mar 12, 2013	13:00	Italy	4–5	Dominican Republic		Marlins Park	3:17	14,482	Boxscore
Mar 12, 2013	20:00	Puerto Rico	1–7	United States		Marlins Park	3:22	32,872	Boxscore
Mar 13, 2013	19:00	Italy	3–4	Puerto Rico		Marlins Park	3:46	27,296	Boxscore
Mar 14, 2013	19:00	Dominican Republic	3–1	United States		Marlins Park	3:17	34,366	Boxscore
Mar 15, 2013	19:00	Puerto Rico	4–3	United States		Marlins Park	3:24	19,762	Boxscore
Mar 16, 2013	13:00	Puerto Rico	0–2	Dominican Republic		Marlins Park	2:58	25,846	Boxscore

== Championship round ==
Semifinals
2R	Puerto Rico	3
1W	Japan	1
1R	Netherlands	1
2W	Dominican Republic	4

Final
SF1W	Puerto Rico	0
SF2W	Dominican Republic	3

=== Semifinals ===
Date	Local time	Road team	Score	Home team	Inn.	Venue	Game duration	Attendance	Boxscore
Mar 17, 2013	18:00	Puerto Rico	3–1	Japan		AT&T Park	3:27	33,683	Boxscore
Mar 18, 2013	18:00	Netherlands	1–4	Dominican Republic		AT&T Park	3:09	27,527	Boxscore

=== Final ===
Date	Local time	Road team	Score	Home team	Inn.	Venue	Game duration	Attendance	Boxscore
Mar 19, 2013	17:00	Puerto Rico	0–3	Dominican Republic		AT&T Park	3:06	35,703	Boxscore

== Final standings ==
Organizer WBCI has no interest in the final standings, so IBAF determined final standings for its men's baseball world rankings.

In the final standings, ties were to be broken in the following order of priority:

1. The team with the highest Team's Quality Balance (TQB=(RS/IPO)–(RA/IPD)) in all games;
2. The team with the highest Earned Runs Team's Quality Balance (ER–TQB=(ERS/IPO)–(ERA/IPD)) in all games;
3. The team with the highest batting average (AVG) in all games;

Rk	Team	W	L	Tiebreaker
1	Dominican Republic	8	0	–
Lost in Final
2	Puerto Rico	5	4	–
Lost in Semifinals
3	Japan	5	2	–
4	Netherlands	4	4	–
Eliminated in Second Round
5	Cuba	4	2	–
6	United States	3	3	–
7	Italy	2	3	0.103 TQB
8	Chinese Taipei	2	3	−0.190 TQB
Eliminated in First Round
9	South Korea	2	1	–
10	Venezuela	1	2	−0.154 TQB
11	Mexico	1	2	−0.185 TQB
12	Canada	1	2	−0.308 TQB
13	China	1	2	−0.534 TQB
14	Brazil	0	3	−0.318 TQB
15	Spain	0	3	−0.467 TQB
16	Australia	0	3	−0.486 TQB

2013 World Baseball Classic champions

Dominican Republic
First title

== Attendance ==
781,438 (avg. 20,037; pct. 59.5%)

=== First round ===
359,243 (avg. 14,968; pct. 50.2%)

- Pool A – 79,168 (avg. 13,195; pct. 34.2%)
- Pool B – 69,834 (avg. 11,639; pct. 58.2%)
- Pool C – 95,058 (avg. 15,843; pct. 86.7%)
- Pool D – 115,183 (avg. 19,197; pct. 45.3%)
  - Chase Field – 110,705 (avg. 22,141; pct. 45.5%)
  - Salt River Fields at Talking Stick – 4,478 (avg. 4,478; pct. 40.7%)

=== Second round ===
325,282 (avg. 27,107; pct. 68.8%)

- Pool 1 – 170,658 (avg. 28,443; pct. 67.7%)
- Pool 2 – 154,624 (avg. 25,771; pct. 70.1%)

=== Championship round ===
96,913 (avg. 32,304; pct. 77.1%)

- Semifinals – 61,210 (avg. 30,605; pct. 73.0%)
- Final – 35,703 (avg. 35,703; pct. 85.2%)

== 2013 All-World Baseball Classic team ==
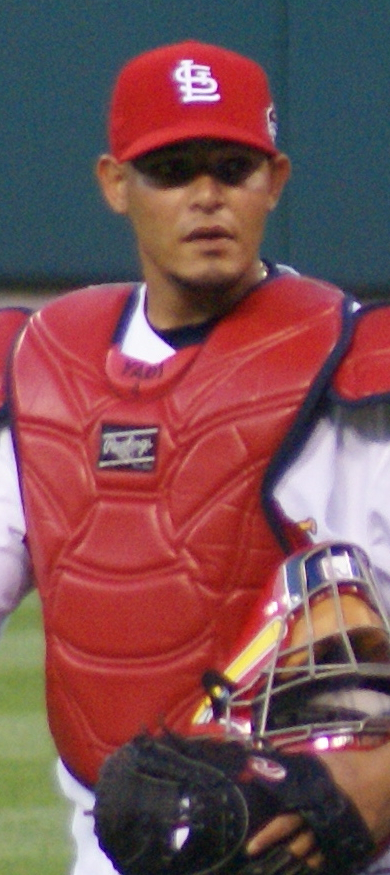
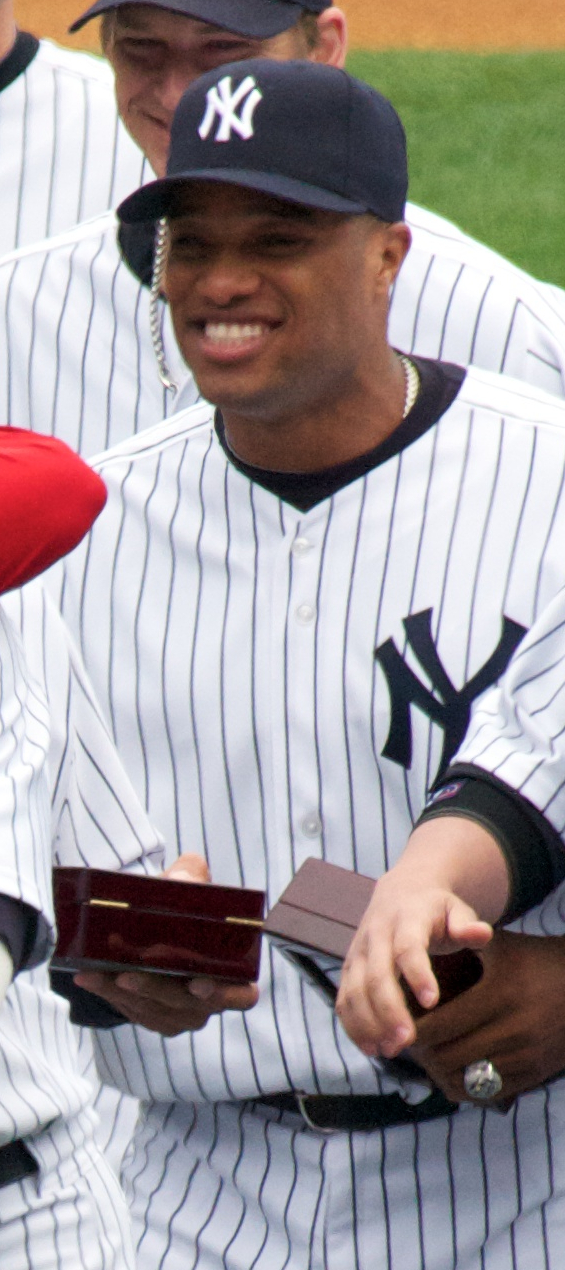
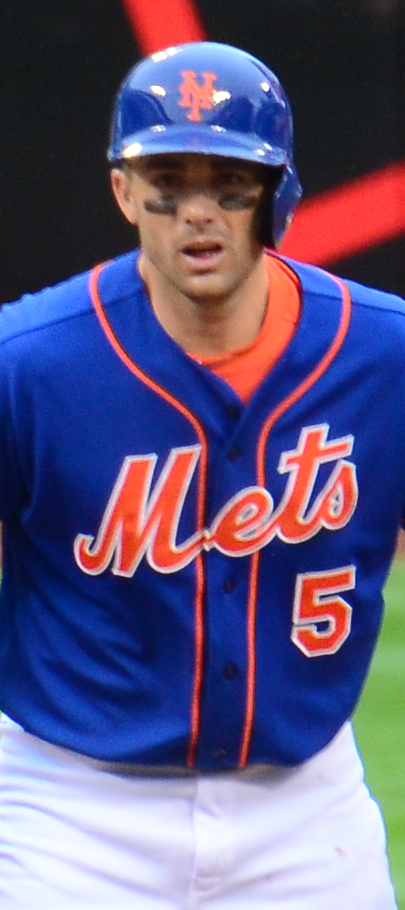
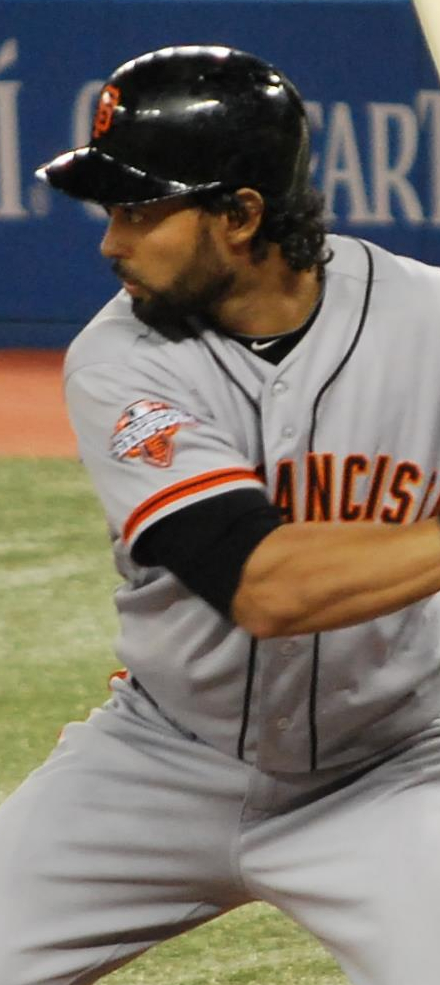
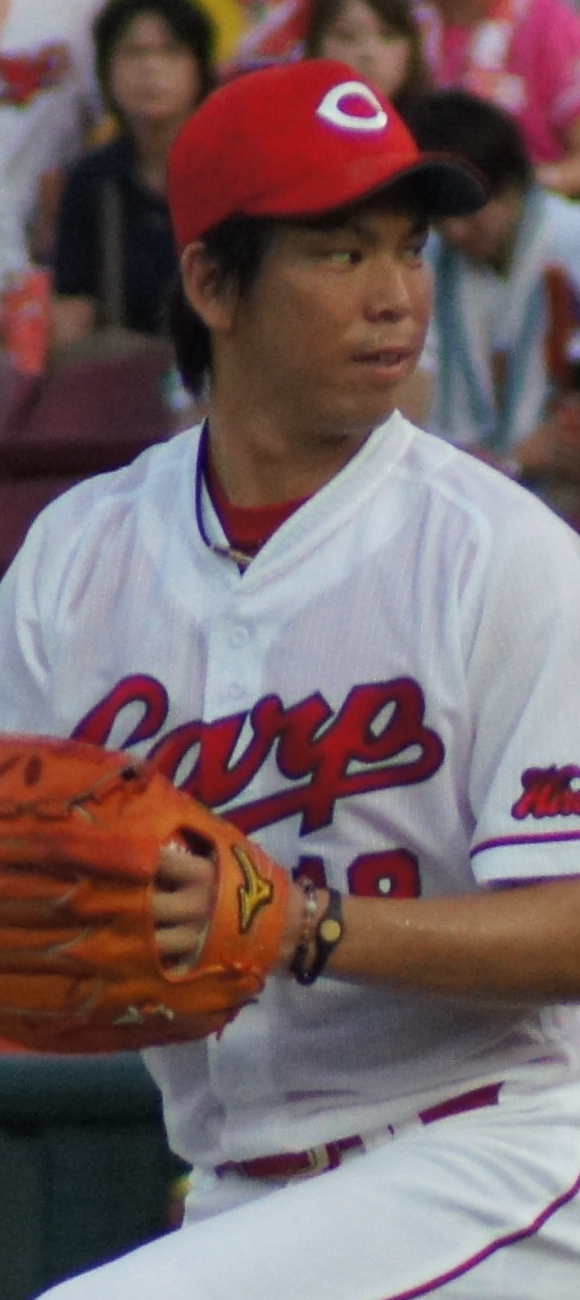
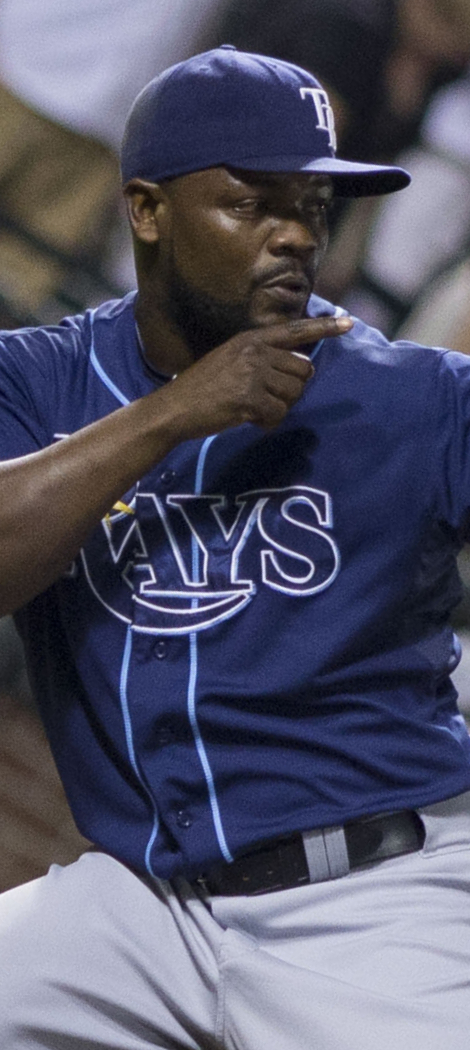
Players named to the All-WBC Team (from left to right);
Catcher – Yadier Molina of Puerto Rico
Second baseman – Robinson Canó of the Dominican Republic
Third baseman – David Wright of the United States
Outfielder – Ángel Pagán of Puerto Rico
Pitcher – Kenta Maeda of Japan
Pitcher – Fernando Rodney of the Dominican Republic

Note: The tournament Most Valuable Player was Robinson Canó.

Position	Player
C	(Puerto Rico) Yadier Molina
1B	(Dominican Republic) Edwin Encarnación
2B	(Dominican Republic) Robinson Canó
3B	(United States) David Wright
SS	(Dominican Republic) José Reyes
OF	(Dominican Republic) Nelson Cruz
OF	(Puerto Rico) Ángel Pagán
OF	(Canada) Michael Saunders
DH	(Japan) Hirokazu Ibata
P	(Puerto Rico) Nelson Figueroa
P	(Japan) Kenta Maeda
P	(Dominican Republic) Fernando Rodney

== Statistics leaders ==
=== Batting ===
Statistic	Name	Total/Avg
Batting average*	(Canada) Michael Saunders	.727
Hits	(Dominican Republic) Robinson Canó	15
Runs	(Netherlands) Andrelton Simmons	10
Home runs	(Cuba) José Abreu (Cuba) Alfredo Despaigne	3
RBI	(United States) David Wright	10
Walks	(Dominican Republic) Carlos Santana	9
Strikeouts	(Dominican Republic) Alejandro De Aza (Dominican Republic) Edwin Encarnación (Netherlands) Jonathan Schoop	8
Stolen bases	(Netherlands) Randolph Oduber	3
On-base percentage*	(Canada) Michael Saunders	.769
Slugging percentage*	(Canada) Michael Saunders	1.273
OPS*	(Canada) Michael Saunders	2.042

* Minimum 2.7 plate appearances per game

=== Pitching ===
Statistic	Name	Total/Avg
Wins	(Dominican Republic) Pedro Strop	3
Losses	39 Players	1
Saves	(Dominican Republic) Fernando Rodney	7
Innings pitched	(Japan) Kenta Maeda	15.0
Hits allowed	(Netherlands) Diego Markwell	17
Runs allowed	(Netherlands) Tom Stuifbergen	9
Earned runs allowed	(Netherlands) David Bergman (Netherlands) Tom Stuifbergen	8
ERA*	(Chinese Taipei) Chien-Ming Wang	0.00**
Walks	(Dominican Republic) Edinson Vólquez	6
Strikeouts	(Japan) Kenta Maeda	18
WHIP*	(South Korea) Seung-hwan Oh	0.00

* Minimum 0.8 innings pitched per game
** Wang is tied with 14 others with a 0.00 ERA but he pitched the most innings with 12

== Additional rules ==
Once again, there were limits on the number of pitches thrown in a game, though the limits themselves were changed from the previous tournament:

- 65 pitches in First Round (down from 70 in 2009)
- 80 pitches in Second Round (down from 85 in 2009)
- 95 pitches in Championship Round (down from 100 in 2009)

If a pitcher reached his limit during a plate appearance, he was allowed to finish pitching to the batter but was removed from the game at the end of the plate appearance.

A pitcher must:

- Not pitch until a minimum of four days have passed since he last pitched, if he threw 50 or more pitches when he last pitched;
- Not pitch until a minimum of one day has passed since he last pitched, if he threw 30 or more pitches when he last pitched;
- Not pitch until a minimum of one day has passed since any second consecutive day on which the pitcher pitched;

For purposes of the pitcher use limitation rules, both semifinal games were to be deemed to have been played on the day of the latest semifinal game.

A mercy rule came into effect when one team led by either 15 runs after five innings, or ten runs after seven innings in the first two rounds.

Instant replay was also available to umpires during the tournament. As was introduced in Major League Baseball during the 2008 season, replays were only used to adjudicate on home run decisions, to determine whether the ball was fair or foul, over the fence or not, and the impact of fan interference.

An alternative version of the IBAF's extra inning rule was also used. If after 12 innings the score was still tied, each half inning thereafter would have started with runners on second and first base. The runners would have been the eighth and ninth hitters due in that inning respectively. For example, if the number five hitter was due to lead off the inning, the number three hitter would have been on second base, and the number four hitter on first base. However, this rule was never actually employed in the tournament, as the only extra-inning game in the tournament ended prior to a 13th inning.

== Media coverage ==
MLB Network was announced as the English-language broadcaster of the 2013 and 2017 tournaments. ESPN Deportes provided Spanish-language coverage, and ESPN Radio had audio rights.

Sportsnet was the broadcaster in Canada and ESPN America in United Kingdom, Ireland, and other parts of Europe.
