= Tri-City ValleyCats =

Frontier League baseball franchise in Troy, New York

- Founded in 2002; Troy, New York
Team logo
Cap insignia

Minor league affiliations
- Class: Independent (2021–present)
- Previous classes: Short-Season A (2002–2020)
- League: National Association of Professional Baseball (2021–present)
- Previous leagues: New York–Penn League (2002–2020)

Major league affiliations
- Previous teams: Houston Astros (2002–2020)

Minor league titles
- League titles (3): 2010; 2013; 2018
- Division titles (8): 2004; 2006; 2010; 2012; 2013; 2014; 2015; 2018
- Wild card berths (2): 2024; 2025

Team data
- Name: Tri-City Valley Cats (2002–present)
- Colors: Red, black, white, gray, tan, green
- Mascot: SouthPaw, Pappy and Ribbie
- Ballpark: Joseph L. Bruno Stadium
- Owner/ Operator: Bill Gladstone
- General manager: Matt Callahan
- Manager: Greg Tagert
- Media: HomeTeam Network
- Website: tcvalleycats.com

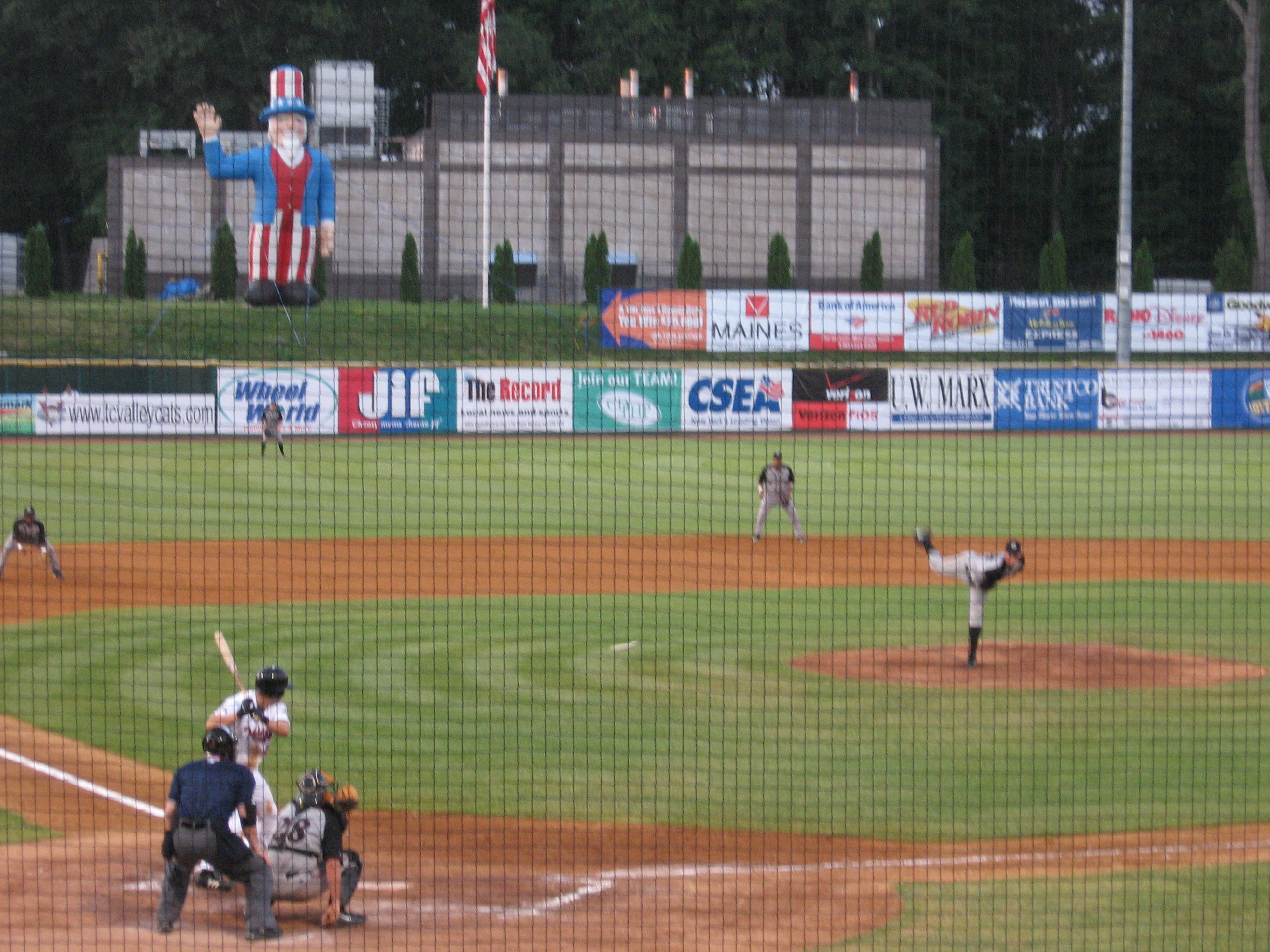
A Tri-City ValleyCats game

The Tri-City ValleyCats are a professional baseball team based in Troy, New York. The ValleyCats compete in the National Association of Professional Baseball (NAPB) as a member of the North Division in the Atlantic Conference, but were previously members of Minor League Baseball's New York–Penn League (NYPL) as the Class A Short Season affiliate of the Houston Astros. The team began play in 2002 when the Pittsfield Astros relocated to Troy following the 2001 season. The ValleyCats have played their home games at Joseph L. Bruno Stadium since 2002.

With MLB's reorganization of the minor leagues after the 2020 season, the ValleyCats were not selected to continue in affiliated baseball. The ValleyCats, along with the Ottawa Titans, were added to the Frontier League during the 2021 expansion.

== History ==
=== Before Tri-City ===
Prior to their arrival in Albany, the club was based first in Little Falls, New York, as the Little Falls Mets (1977–1988), and then in Pittsfield, Massachusetts, as the Pittsfield Mets (1989–2000) and Pittsfield Astros (2001).

=== 2002 season ===
The ValleyCats played their first game on the road in Lowell, Massachusetts, on June 18, 2002, against their former rivals, the Lowell Spinners. The Spinners had a 3–1 lead going into the eighth inning, but a triple by Aneudi Cuevas down the right field line drove in three runs leading the ValleyCats to a 5–4 victory.

=== 2006 season ===
In their 2006 season, the ValleyCats registered an attendance of 129,126 in 37 contests, averaging 3,489 fans per game. On July 4, 2006, the ValleyCats set a new all-time home attendance mark as 6,123 people attended a game against the Lowell Spinners which was later broken in the following years.

=== 2008 season ===
==== All-Star game ====
The Valley Cats hosted the fourth annual New York–Penn League All-Star Game at Joseph L. Bruno Stadium in 2008. The game was played between teams made up of the affiliates of National League (NL) and American League (AL) teams. The ValleyCats, affiliates of the National League's Houston Astros, were part of the NL squad. Four ValleyCats were voted to play in the game: first baseman Phil Disher, left fielder Jack Shuck, pitcher Philip Rummel, and center fielder Thomas Steele. However, Steele was injured two weeks before the game and was replaced by Tri-City third baseman David Flores. The NL All-Stars won the game on a walk-off RBI by Tri-City's David Flores. Flores was also voted MVP of the game.

==== No-hitter ====
On June 21, 2008, pitchers Shane Wolf, David Miller, and Ashton Mowdy combined to throw the first no-hitter in the franchise's history. Wolf is a native of nearby Lansing. The ValleyCats won, 10–0, over the Oneonta Tigers.

=== 2009 season ===
The ValleyCats once again broke attendance records in 2009. Their single-game attendance record was broken again on July 4 against the Brooklyn Cyclones. A crowd of 6,838 fans attended the 2–1 ValleyCats loss. They also set a new single season attendance record, attracting 145,976 fans to Joseph L. Bruno Stadium that season. Tri-City finished the season in fourth place in the Stedler Division, 18 games behind first-place Lowell.

=== 2010 Championship season ===
After three losing seasons, the ValleyCats finally turned around to be one of the front runners in the Stedler Division. Led by manager Jim Pankovits, they were the underdog in the 2010 NYPL playoffs with a 38–36 record, and having won their division by only a half game over the Connecticut Tigers. They reached the championship series for the third time in their short history, and beat the heavy favorite Brooklyn Cyclones (51–24), two games to none.

=== 2015 season ===
The second no-hitter in ValleyCats history was thrown on August 6, 2015. Pitchers Kevin McCanna, Ralph Garza, and Zac Person combined for the road win against the Aberdeen IronBirds at Leidos Field at Ripken Stadium, 5–0.

=== 2021 and beyond ===
After the cancelled 2020 minor league season, Major League Baseball took direct control of Minor League Baseball and discontinued short-season play. The ValleyCats were not among the teams invited to continue in affiliated baseball. On January 7, 2021, the team announced that it would be joining the Frontier League, an independent MLB Partner league, for the 2021 season. The 2021 and 2022 seasons were disappointing for the ValleyCats as they missed the playoffs both years. In the 2023 season, the ValleyCats attempted to get into the playoffs. However, they were beaten by the Sussex County Miners for the third and final playoff spot. Despite both clubs having the same record in the East Division, the Miners had a longer winning streak than the Valley Cats. This meant that the ValleyCats missed the playoffs for the fourth year in a row. In 2024, the Valley Cats clinched the playoffs for the first time since 2018, placing second in the East Division. However, they lost to the Ottawa Titans in the Wild Card game 5-2. They made the playoffs again in 2025. They swept the Sussex County Miners in two straight games in the Wild Card Round, but lost to the Québec Capitales three games to one in the East Division Conference Finals.

== Mascots ==
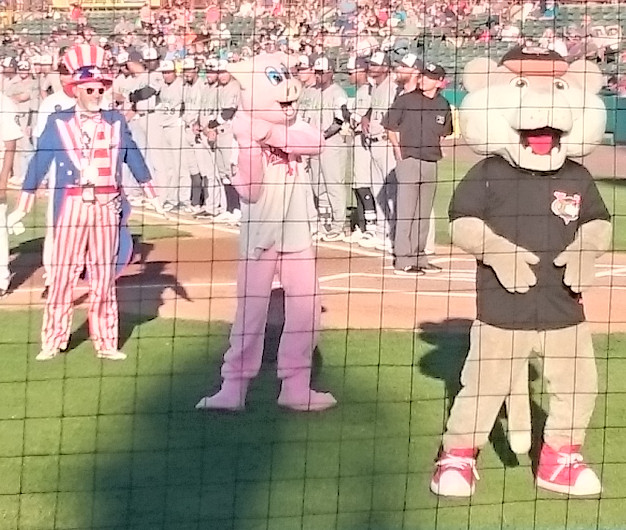
Left to right: Sammy, Ribbie, and SouthPaw

The ValleyCats have several mascots, the three most prominent being SouthPaw, his grandfather, Pappy, and his best friend, Ribbie. SouthPaw is a jersey-wearing cat, representing the "ValleyCat", the team's nickname. Another fan-favorite is Sammy Baseball who wears a patriotic costume and resembles Uncle Sam, reputedly derived from Samuel Wilson who operated a meat packing plant in Albany. The Tri-City Mayors, large caricature heads representing the current Mayors of Troy, Albany, and Schenectady, race (and dance) on a nightly basis at the ballpark. Ketchup, Mustard, and Relish mascots participate in a hot dog race. Other mascots include Spiedie the Chicken, Zoggy the Dinosaur, and Rowdy the River Rat, obtained when the Albany River Rats moved to Charlotte, North Carolina.

== Season results ==
Season	League	Manager	Record
2002	NYPL	Iván DeJesús	27–48, 4th place Stedler
2003	NYPL	Iván DeJesús	44–32, 2nd place Stedler
2004^{†}	NYPL	Gregg Langbehn	50–25, 1st place Stedler
2005	NYPL	Gregg Langbehn	34–42, 3rd place Stedler
2006^{†}	NYPL	Gregg Langbehn	43–31, 1st place Stedler
2007	NYPL	Pete Rancont	27–47, 4th place Stedler
2008	NYPL	Pete Rancont	28–45, 4th place Stedler
2009	NYPL	Jim Pankovits	27–48, 4th place Stedler
2010^{‡}	NYPL	Jim Pankovits	38–36, 1st place Stedler
2011	NYPL	Stubby Clapp	33–42, 3rd place Stedler
2012^{†}	NYPL	Stubby Clapp	51–25, 1st place Stedler
2013^{‡}	NYPL	Ed Romero	44–32, 1st place Stedler
2014^{†}	NYPL	Ed Romero	48–28, 1st place Stedler
2015^{§}	NYPL	Ed Romero	42–33, 1st place Stedler
2016	NYPL	Lamarr Rogers	38–38, 3rd place Stedler
2017	NYPL	Morgan Ensberg	34–39, 3rd place Stedler
2018^{‡}	NYPL	Jason Bell	42–33, 1st place Stedler
2019	NYPL	Ozney Guillen	32–42, 4th place Stedler
2020			Season not played due to COVID-19
2021	Frontier	Pete Incaviglia	50–46, 2nd place Atlantic
2022	Frontier	Pete Incaviglia	54–41, 5th place East
2023	Frontier	Pete Incaviglia	55–40, 4th place East
2024	Frontier	Greg Tagert	52–41, 2nd place East
2025	Frontier	Greg Tagert	62–34, 2nd place East
2026	Frontier	Greg Tagert	39–61, 4th place East

NY–Penn League champions (‡)	NY–Penn League finalists (†)	Stedler Division champions (§)	Wild Card winner (*)

== Postseason results ==
- 2004: Defeated Brooklyn Cyclones, 2 games to 1; lost to Mahoning Valley Scrappers, 2 games to 0, in championship round.
- 2006: Defeated Auburn Doubledays, 2 games to none; lost to Staten Island Yankees, 2 games to 1, in championship round.
- 2010: Defeated Batavia Muckdogs, 2 games to 1; defeated Brooklyn Cyclones, 2 games to 0, in championship round.
- 2012: Defeated Auburn Doubledays, 2 games to 1; lost to Hudson Valley Renegades, 2 game to 1, in championship round.
- 2013: Defeated Aberdeen IronBirds, 2 games to 0; defeated State College Spikes, 2 games to 1, in championship round.
- 2014: Defeated the Connecticut Tigers, 2 games to none; lost to the State College Spikes, 2 games to 1.
- 2015: Lost semi-finals to Staten Island Yankees, 2 games to 0.
- 2018: Defeated Mahoning Valley Scrappers, 2 games to 0; defeated Hudson Valley Renegades, 2 games to 0, in championship round.
- 2024: Lost East Division Wild Card Game to Ottawa Titans 5-2.
- 2025: Won Wild Card Round vs. Sussex County Miners 2 games to 0; Lost East Division Conference Finals to Québec Capitales 3 games to 1

== Fast facts ==
- Total Attendance
  - Joseph L. Bruno Stadium
    - 2002 – 108,409
    - 2003 – 103,984
    - 2004 – 110,497
    - 2005 – 116,674
    - 2006 – 129,126
    - 2007 – 136,809
    - 2008 – 140,631 (7th most in NY–Penn League).
    - 2009 – 145,976 (6th most in NY–Penn League).
    - 2010 – 155,315 (5th most in NY–Penn League).
    - 2011 – 156,297 (6th most in NY–Penn League).
    - 2012 – 159,966 (5th most in NY–Penn League).
    - 2013 – 156,712 (4th most in NY–Penn League).
    - 2014 – 161,171 (3rd most in NY–Penn League).
    - 2015 – 153,692 (3rd most in NY–Penn League).
    - 2016 – 149,847 (3rd most in NY–Penn League).
    - 2017 – 142,922 (3rd most in NY–Penn League).
    - 2018 – 140,036 (3rd most in NY–Penn League).
    - 2019 - 131,529 (3rd most in NY-Penn League).
    - 2020 - SEASON CANCELLED DUE TO COVID-19.
    - 2021 - 100,519 (2nd most in Frontier League).
    - 2022 - 134,617 (5th most in Frontier League).
    - 2023 - 136,231 (4th most in Frontier League).
    - 2024 - 135,036 (3rd most in Frontier League).
    - 2025 - 131,108 (3rd most in Frontier League).
- Ballpark Dimensions
  - LF – 325 feet (99 m)
  - CF – 400 feet (122 m)
  - RF – 325 feet (99 m)
- First Game
  - Tuesday, June 18, 2002 vs Lowell Spinners (at LeLacheur Park, Lowell, Massachusetts – W 5–4)
- Season Records (2002–present)
  - Hits
    - 2022 – Brantley Bell (138)
  - Doubles
    - 2022 – Brantley Bell (30)
  - Triples
    - 2015 – Aaron Mizell (7)
    - 2017 – Andy Pineda (7)
  - Home runs
    - 2022 – Denis Phipps (33)
  - Runs Batted In
    - 2022 – Denis Phipps (91)
  - Stolen Bases
    - 2023 – Jaxon Hallmark (33)
  - Wins
    - 2004 – Ronnie Ventura (11)
  - Saves
    - 2021 – Trey Cochran-Gill (24)
  - Strikeouts
    - 2022 – Joey Gonzalez (128)

== Current roster ==
Tri-City ValleyCats roster
Active roster	Coaching staff
Pitchers: 22 Wes Albert; -- Brayahns Barreto; -- Duke Brotherton; 29 Chas Cywin; 35 Nick DeCarlo; 21 Austin Dill; -- Hollis Fanning; -- Liu Fuenmayor; 6 Rolando Heredia-Bustos; 27 Easton Klein; -- Mikell Manzano ‡; 26 Arlo Marynczak; 18 Nathan Medrano ‡; -- Caden O'Brien; -- Tom Peltier; 32 Gino Sabatine; -- Stephen Still; -- Brenton Thiels; -- Luke Trueman; -- Paul Turelli; 17 Connor Wilford; Catchers: 12 Oscar Campos ‡; -- Miguel Useche; Infielders: -- Tyson Gingerich ‡; -- Brody Harding; -- Drew Holderbach; 1 Cam Jones; -- Amani Larry; 7 Josh Leslie; -- John McHenry; 16 Kyle Novak; -- Cedric Rose; -- Santino Rosso; -- Josue Urdaneta; 8 Ian Walters; -- Cooper Weiss; Outfielders: -- Julian Boyd; 11 Dylan Broderick; -- David Glancy; 1 Jaxon Hallmark ‡; 10 Demias Jimerson; -- Ethan Martini; -- Bobby Peirce; 20 Jake Reinisch; -- RJ Stinson; 3 Javeyan Williams	Manager: 37 Greg Tagert; Coaches: 30 Tom Thornton (pitching); Disabled list; ‡ Inactive list; § Suspended list; updated May 4, 2025 Transactions

== Notable alumni ==
Former/Current notable baseball players who played for the ValleyCats as a minor league affiliate, the year they played for the ValleyCats, and the team they debuted with (If debuted yet).

- Mark McLemore (2002, Houston Astros)
- Jailen Peguero (2002, Arizona Diamondbacks)
- Devern Hansack (2002, Boston Red Sox)
- Jason Hirsh (2003, Houston Astros)
- Matt Albers (2003, Houston Astros) (First ValleyCat in the Major Leagues)
- Josh Anderson (2003, Houston Astros)
- Edwin Maysonet (2003, Houston Astros)
- Ben Zobrist (2004, Tampa Bay Rays)
- Hunter Pence (2004, Houston Astros)
- Troy Patton (2004, Houston Astros)
- Chad Reineke (2004, San Diego Padres)
- Drew Sutton (2004, Cincinnati Reds)
- Tommy Manzella (2005, Houston Astros)
- Koby Clemens (2005)
- Felipe Paulino (2005, Houston Astros)
- Brian Bogusevic (2005–2006, Houston Astros)
- Chris Johnson (2006, Houston Astros)
- Bud Norris (2006, Houston Astros)
- Víctor Gárate (2006–2007, Washington Nationals)
- Fernando Abad (2007, Houston Astros)
- Brandon Barnes (2007, Houston Astros)
- Jason Castro (2008, Houston Astros)
- Jordan Lyles (2008, Houston Astros)
- J. B. Shuck (2008, Houston Astros)
- J. D. Martinez (2009, Houston Astros)
- Jose Altuve (2009, Houston Astros)
- Dallas Keuchel (2009, Houston Astros)
- Jake Goebbert (2009, San Diego Padres)
- Jorge de León (2009–2010, Houston Astros)
- David Martínez (2010, Houston Astros)
- Jake Buchanan, (2010, Houston Astros)
- Kiké Hernández (2010, Houston Astros)
- George Springer (2011, Houston Astros)
- Nick Tropeano (2011, Houston Astros)
- Matt Duffy (2011, San Francisco Giants)
- Dayán Díaz (2011, Cincinnati Reds)
- Preston Tucker (2012, Houston Astros)
- Vince Velasquez (2012, Houston Astros)
- Brady Rodgers (2012, Houston Astros)
- Juan Minaya (2012, Chicago White Sox)
- Tyler Heineman (2012, Miami Marlins)
- Chia-Jen Lo (2013, Houston Astros)
- Michael Feliz (2013, Houston Astros)
- Adrian Houser (2013, Milwaukee Brewers)
- Tyler White (2013, Houston Astros)
- Tony Kemp (2013, Houston Astros)
- Richard Rodríguez (2013, Baltimore Orioles)
- Jack Mayfield (2013, Houston Astros)
- Troy Scribner (2013–2014, Los Angeles Angels)
- Daniel Mengden (2014, Oakland Athletics)
- A. J. Reed (2014, Houston Astros)
- Joe Musgrove (2014, Houston Astros)
- Derek Fisher (2014, Houston Astros)
- J. D. Davis (2014, Houston Astros)
- Alfredo González (2014, Chicago White Sox)
- Jason Martin (2014, Pittsburgh Pirates)
- Ryan Thompson (2014, Tampa Bay Rays)
- David Paulino (2015, Houston Astros)
- Elieser Hernández (2015, Miami Marlins)
- Dean Deetz (2015, Houston Astros)
- Trent Thornton (2015, Toronto Blue Jays)
- Garrett Stubbs (2015, Houston Astros)
- Rogelio Armenteros (2015, Houston Astros)
- Zac Grotz (2015, Seattle Mariners)
- Ralph Garza Jr. (2015, Houston Astros)
- José Urquidy (2015; 2018, Houston Astros)
- Framber Valdez (2016, Houston Astros)
- Jake Rogers (2016, Detroit Tigers)
- Jorge Alcalá (2016, Minnesota Twins)
- Taylor Jones (2016, Houston Astros)
- Carlos Sanabria (2016, Houston Astros)
- Daz Cameron (2016, Detroit Tigers)
- Héctor Pérez (2016, Toronto Blue Jays)
- Ronnie Dawson (2016, Houston Astros)
- Alex De Goti (2016, Houston Astros)
- Ryan Hartman (2016, Houston Astros)
- Akeem Bostick (2016, New York Mets)
- Bryan De La Cruz (2016-2017, Miami Marlins)
- Corbin Martin (2017, Houston Astros)
- Patrick Sandoval (2017, Los Angeles Angels)
- Abraham Toro (2017, Houston Astros)
- Jonathan Araúz (2017, Boston Red Sox)
- Cristian Javier (2017, Houston Astros)
- Brandon Bielak (2017, Houston Astros)
- Tyler Ivey (2017, Houston Astros)
- Jake Meyers (2017, Houston Astros)
- Humberto Castellanos (2017–2018, Houston Astros)
- J. B. Bukauskas (2017–2018, Arizona Diamondbacks)
- Bryan Abreu (2018, Houston Astros)
- Nivaldo Rodríguez (2018, Houston Astros)
- Luis García (2018, Houston Astros)
- Gilberto Celestino (2018, Minnesota Twins)
- CJ Stubbs (2019, Washington Nationals)

Former/Current notable baseball players who played for the ValleyCats in the Frontier League, the year they played for the ValleyCats, and the team they returned with.

- Chris Kwitzer (2021)
- Denis Phipps (2021–2022)
- Willy García (2021–2022)
- Ryan Hartman (2022)
- Kumar Rocker (2022)
- Cito Culver (2022–2023)
- Reymin Guduan (2023)
- Aaron Altherr (2023)
- Carson McCusker (2021–2023, Minnesota Twins)

== See also ==
- Sports in New York's Capital District
