= Joseph L. Bruno Stadium =

Baseball stadium in Troy, New York

- "The Joe"
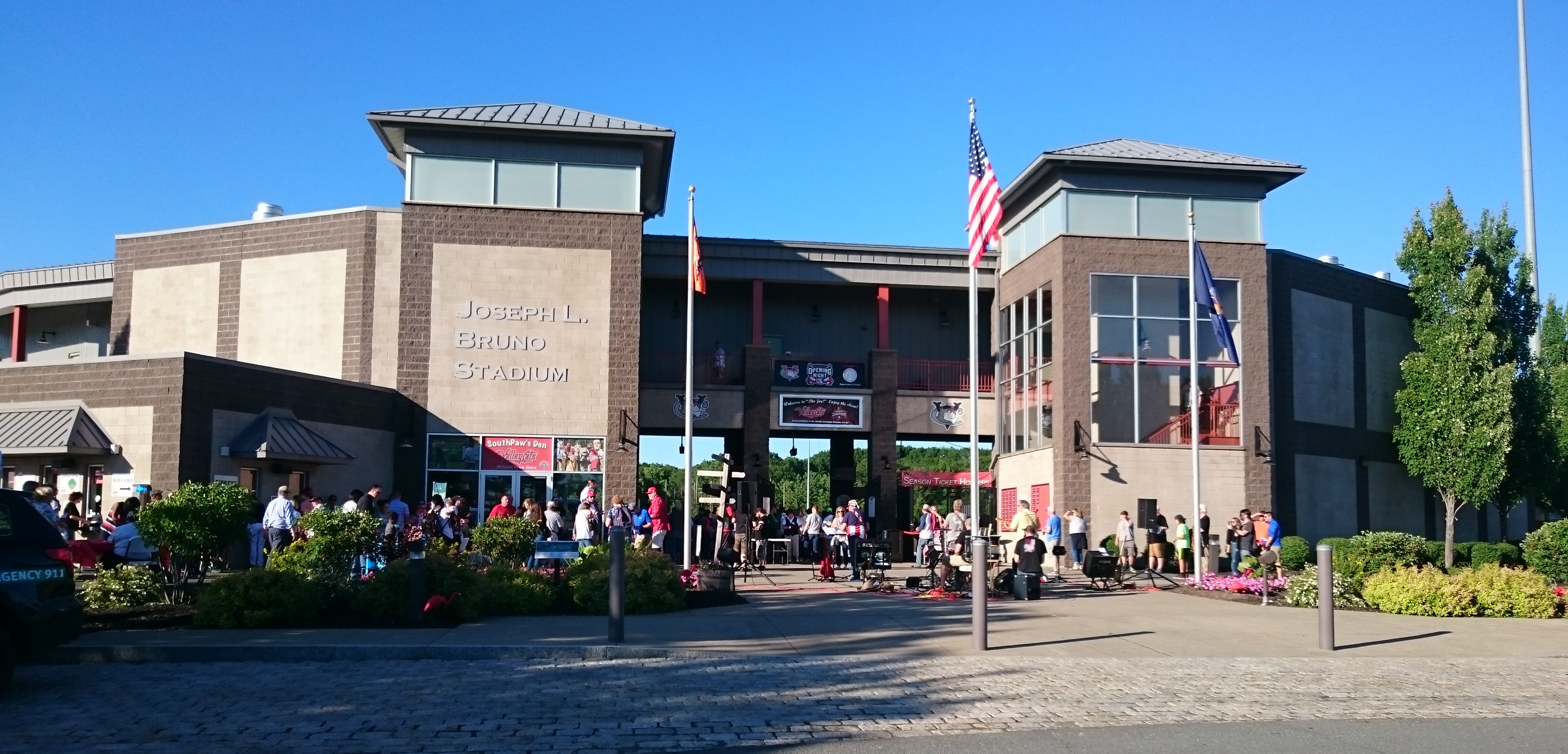
- The entrance of Joseph L. Bruno Stadium

- Location within New York Location within the United States
- Interactive map of Joseph L. Bruno Stadium
- Address: 80 Vandenburgh Avenue; Troy, New York, 12180
- Coordinates: 42.695329°N 73.680464°W
- Owner: Hudson Valley Community College
- Operator: Hudson Valley Community College
- Capacity: 6,500 (8,000 with lawn seating)
- Surface: Grass
- Record attendance: 6,888 (July 4, 2011)
- Field size: Left field: 325 feet Center field: 400 feet Right field: 325 feet

Construction
- Groundbreaking: May 6, 2001
- Opened: April 6, 2002
- Cost: US$14 million ($25.1 million in 2025 dollars)
- Architect: DLR Group
- Structural engineer: CHA Sports
- Services engineer: Quantum Engineering Company
- General contractor: U.W. Marx Construction Co.

Tenants
- Tri-City ValleyCats (NAPB) 2002–present Hudson Valley Vikings (NJCAA) 2002–present

Joseph L. Bruno Stadium is a baseball stadium located on the campus of Hudson Valley Community College in Troy, New York. It is the home field of the Tri-City ValleyCats of the National Association of Professional Baseball (NAPB). The ballpark has 6,500 seats and a lawn seating area in the outfield that holds an additional 1,500 people, bringing the total capacity to 8,000. Located in the center of the tri-city area of New York's Capital Region (Albany, Schenectady and Troy), it was named after former New York State Senate Majority Leader Joseph Bruno, who helped secure the funds for the ballpark.

== Attendance ==
In 2012, the ValleyCats set a new single-season attendance record for the 9th-consecutive year, drawing 159,966 fans. The record was bolstered by 17 sellout crowds, also a new franchise record.

The ValleyCats set attendance records in 2004 (110,497), 2005 (116,674), 2006 (129,126), 2007 (136,809), 2008 (140,631), 2009 (145,976), 2010 (155,315), 2011 (156,279) and yet again in 2012 (159,966). The 'Cats have drawn a grand total of 1,463,669 fans since their inception in 2002. They welcomed in their 1.5 millionth fan during the 2013 season.

== Other events ==
=== 2008 New York–Penn League All-Star Game ===
On August 19 "The Joe" hosted the 2008 New York–Penn League All-Star game, the fourth in league history. The game was won by the NL All-Stars with a walk off RBI by ValleyCats third baseman David Flores. This game was the second largest opening for "The Joe" in the 2008 season.

=== K.O. at the Joe ===
K.O. at the Joe was a series of amateur boxing matches held at the stadium. The first was in 2007 and was brought back in 2008 and 2009.

=== World Series Trophy viewing ===
On May 5, 2011, the San Francisco Giants' World Series Trophy was on display for Capital Region fans. The stop in Albany was part of a public tour the team launched to celebrate its first World Series championship since 1954, and the first since moving from New York City to San Francisco. The franchise originally began in Troy competing as the Troy Trojans from 1879–1882.

On August 3, 2018, the Houston Astros' World Series trophy was on display at The Joe after Houston won its first championship.

=== Metro Atlantic Athletic Conference tournament ===
From May 24–27, 2012, the stadium hosted the 2012 Metro Atlantic Athletic Conference baseball tournament, which was won by Manhattan.

Preceded by Wahconah Park	Home of the Tri-City ValleyCats; 2002 – present	Succeeded by Current
