= 2024 American Association season =

19th annual season of American Association Baseball

- League: American Association of Professional Baseball
- Sport: Baseball
- Duration: May 9 – September 2
- Games: 100
- Teams: 12
- Total attendance: 1,610,478
- Average attendance: 2,791

East Division
- League champions: Kane County Cougars

West Division
- League champions: Winnipeg Goldeyes

Miles Wolff Cup Finals
- Champions: Kane County Cougars (1st title)
- Runners-up: Winnipeg Goldeyes

Seasons
- ← 2023 2025 →

The 2024 American Association season was the 19th season of professional baseball in the American Association of Professional Baseball (AA) since its creation in October 2005. There are 12 AA teams, split evenly between the East Division and the West Division.

The Kansas City Monarchs entered the season as defending champions, having defeated the Chicago Dogs, three games to one, in the league's 2023 championship series.

== Season schedule ==
The league is split up into two divisions, the East and West Division. The season will be played with a 100-game schedule, with two home series and two road series inside a teams’ division, and one home series and one road series against the clubs outside its division. The top four teams in each division will qualify for the 2024 playoffs.

The league announced that the 2024 All-Star Game would take place at Legends Field, the home of the Kansas City Monarchs. The league's annual Home Run Derby will take place on Monday, July 22nd and the All-Star Game will take place on Tuesday, July 23rd.

== Regular season standings ==
East Division Regular Season Standings
Pos	Team	G	W	L	Pct.	GB
1	y – Cleburne Railroaders	100	60	40	.600	--
2	x – Kane County Cougars	100	55	45	.550	5.0
3	x – Chicago Dogs	100	55	45	.545	5.0
4	x – Lake Country DockHounds	100	53	47	.530	7.0
5	e – Milwaukee Milkmen	100	49	51	.490	11.0
6	e – Gary SouthShore RailCats	100	30	70	.300	30.0

West Division Regular Season Standings
Pos	Team	G	W	L	Pct.	GB
1	y – Winnipeg Goldeyes	99	56	43	.566	--
2	x – Sioux Falls Canaries	99	55	44	.556	1.0
3	x – Fargo-Moorhead RedHawks	100	53	47	.530	3.5
4	x – Sioux City Explorers	100	49	51	.490	7.5
5	e – Kansas City Monarchs	100	46	54	.460	10.5
6	e – Lincoln Saltdogs	100	38	62	.380	18.5

- y – Clinched division
- x – Clinched playoff spot
- e – Eliminated from playoff contention

== Statistical leaders ==
as of September 1, 2024

=== Hitting ===
Stat	Player	Team	Total
HR	Ryan Hernandez	Lake Country DockHounds	29
AVG	Jacob Teter	Chicago Dogs	.348
H	Carter Aldrete	Cleburne Railroaders	134
RBIs	Jacob Teter	Chicago Dogs	93
SB	Ismael Alcantara	Fargo-Moorhead RedHawks	70

=== Pitching ===
Stat	Player	Team	Total
W	Ty Culbreth	Sioux Falls Canaries	12
ERA	Joey Matulovich	Winnipeg Goldeyes	2.12
SO	Joey Matulovich	Winnipeg Goldeyes	145
SV	Joey Marciano	Chicago Dogs	26

== Awards ==
=== All-star selections ===
==== East Division ====
Elected starters
Position	Player	Team
C	Jaxx Groshans	Railroaders
1B	Jacob Teter	Dogs
2B	Carter Aldrete	Railroaders
3B	Josh Altmann	DockHounds
SS	Shed Long Jr.	Railroaders
OF	Hill Alexander	Railroaders
OF	Narciso Crook	Dogs
OF	Brian O'Grady	Railroaders
DH	Todd Lott	Cougars

Reserves
Position	Player	Team
C	Nick Dalesandro	Dogs
C	Erik Ostberg	Milkmen
INF	Brantley Bell	Dogs
INF	Claudio Finol	Cougars
INF	Ryan Hernandez	DockHounds

Pitchers
Player	Team
Nate Alexander	RailCats
John Baker	Dogs
Nick Belzer	Cougars
Alan Zhang Carter	DockHounds
C. J. Carter	Cougars
Joey Marciano	Dogs
Chris Muller	Railroaders
Jhordany Mezquita	Milkmen
Jacques Pucheu	Railroaders
Mark Simon	Milkmen
Josh Smith	RailCats

==== West Division ====
Elected starters
Position	Player	Team
C	Rob Emery	Goldeyes
1B	Frankie Tostado	Monarchs
2B	Dayson Croes	Goldeyes
3B	Jack Dragum	Saltdogs
SS	Jordan Barth	Canaries
OF	Scott Ota	Explorers
OF	Josh Rehwaldt	Canaries
OF	Aaron Takacs	Saltdogs
DH	Luke Roskam	Saltdogs

Reserves
Position	Player	Team
C	Herbert Iser	Monarchs
INF	Trevor Achenbach	Canaries
INF	Mike Hart	Canaries
OF	Ismael Alcantara	RedHawks
OF	Miles Simington	Goldeyes

Pitchers
Player	Team
Ty Culbreth	Canaries
Jake Dykhoff	RedHawks
Davis Feldman	RedHawks
Julian Garcia	Monarchs
Dan Kubiuk	Saltdogs
Kyle Marman	Explorers
Joey Matulovich	Goldeyes
Joey Murray	Explorers
Travis Seabrooke	Goldeyes
Nate Tellier	Monarchs
Zach Veen	Canaries

All-star game MVP — Ismael Alcantara, Fargo-Moorhead RedHawks

Home Run Derby Champion — Brian O'Grady, Cleburne Railroaders

=== End of year awards ===
Award	Player	Team
Most Valuable Player	Jacob Teter	Chicago Dogs
Pitcher of the Year	Joey Matulovich	Winnipeg Goldeyes
Rookie of the Year	Ryan Hernandez	Lake Country DockHounds
Manager of the Year	Logan Watkins	Winnipeg Goldeyes

=== Postseason All-Stars ===
Position	Player	Team
Catcher	Jaxx Groshans	Cleburne Railroaders
First Base	Jacob Teter	Chicago Dogs
Second Base	Carter Aldrete	Cleburne Railroaders
Shortstop	Shed Long Jr.	Cleburne Railroaders
Third Base	Claudio Finol	Kane County Cougars
Outfield	Cornelius Randolph	Kane County Cougars
Outfield	Hill Alexander	Cleburne Railroaders
Outfield	Ismael Alcantara	Fargo-Moorhead RedHawks
Designated Hitter	Ryan Hernandez	Lake Country DockHounds
Utility	Dayson Croes	Winnipeg Goldeyes
Starting Pitcher	Joey Matulovich	Winnipeg Goldeyes
Relief Pitcher	Joey Marciano	Chicago Dogs

== Playoffs ==
=== Format ===
In 2024, the top four teams in each division will advance to the playoffs. In a nod to innovation, and to reward the clubs with the best regular seasons, the club that wins the division in the regular season will pick their first-round opponent of the qualifiers within the division, in the best-of-three Division Playoff Series.

In the second round, the Division Championship Series will also be a best-of-three series. The Miles Wolff Cup Finals will culminate in the crowning of a league champion, with a best-of-five series to determine the league champion.

=== Playoff bracket ===
Division Playoff Series (best-of-three)
1	Cleburne	6	0	1
3	Chicago	3	4	3
East
2	Kane County	6	1	X
4	Lake Country	1	0	X
1	Winnipeg	0	7	10
2	Sioux Falls	5	3	3
West
3	Fargo-Moorhead	2	1	6
4	Sioux City	1	7	5

Division Championship Series (best-of-three)
3	Chicago	2	2	X
2	Kane County	5	3	X
1	Winnipeg	10	3	3
3	Fargo-Moorhead	1	5	1

Miles Wolff Cup Finals (best-of-five)
E2	Kane County	2	1	5	X	X
W1	Winnipeg	1	0	3	X	X

== Notable players ==
Former Major League Baseball players who played in the American Association in 2024

- A. J. Alexy (Kansas City)
- Abiatal Avelino (Kansas City)
- Beau Burrows (Cleburne)
- Narciso Crook (Chicago)
- Jaylin Davis (Milwaukee)
- Jon Duplantier (Lake Country)
- Trent Giambrone (Cleburne/Kansas City)
- Ashton Goudeau (Kansas City)
- Deivy Grullón (Lake Country)
- Matt Hall (Kansas City)
- Eric Hanhold (Lake Country)
- Damon Jones (Kansas City)
- Shed Long Jr. (Cleburne)
- Greg Mahle (Kane County)
- Ozzie Martínez (Sioux City)
- John Nogowski (Sioux City)
- Brian O'Grady (Cleburne)
- Yefry Ramírez (Kansas City)
- Zac Reininger (Winnipeg)
- Seth Romero (Cleburne)
- Blake Rutherford (Kansas City)
- Carlos Sanabria (Gary SouthShore)
- Brian Schlitter (Chicago)
- Sterling Sharp (Lake Country)
- Caleb Smith (Cleburne)
- Travis Swaggerty (Kansas City)
- Curtis Terry (Lake Country)
- Dillon Thomas (Fargo-Moorhead)
- Collin Wiles (Kansas City)

Other notable players who played in the American Association in 2024

- Jason Bilous (Chicago)
- Bryan Bonnell (Lake Country)
- Bret Boswell (Cleburne)
- Tucker Bradley (Kansas City)
- Yoelqui Céspedes (Fargo-Moorhead)
- Marek Chlup (Lake Country)
- Brett Conine (Lake Country)
- Thomas Dillard (Cleburne)
- Hayden Dunhurst (Kane County)
- Santiago Florez (Sioux City)
- Ethan Hankins (Gary SouthShore)
- Marshall Kasowski (Winnipeg)
- Joey Marciano (Chicago)
- Chris Muller (Cleburne)
- Joey Murray (Sioux City)
- Justin O'Conner (Kansas City)
- Ian Oxnevad (Lincoln)
- Franklin Pérez (Gary SouthShore)
- Cornelius Randolph (Kane County)
- J. D. Scholten (Sioux City)
- Nick Shumpert (Sioux City)
- Liam Spence (Sioux Falls)
- Chavez Young (Kansas City/Lake Country)

== See also ==
- 2024 Frontier League season
- 2024 Major League Baseball season
- 2024 Pecos League season
