= Luke Hughes (baseball) =

Australian baseball player (born 1984)

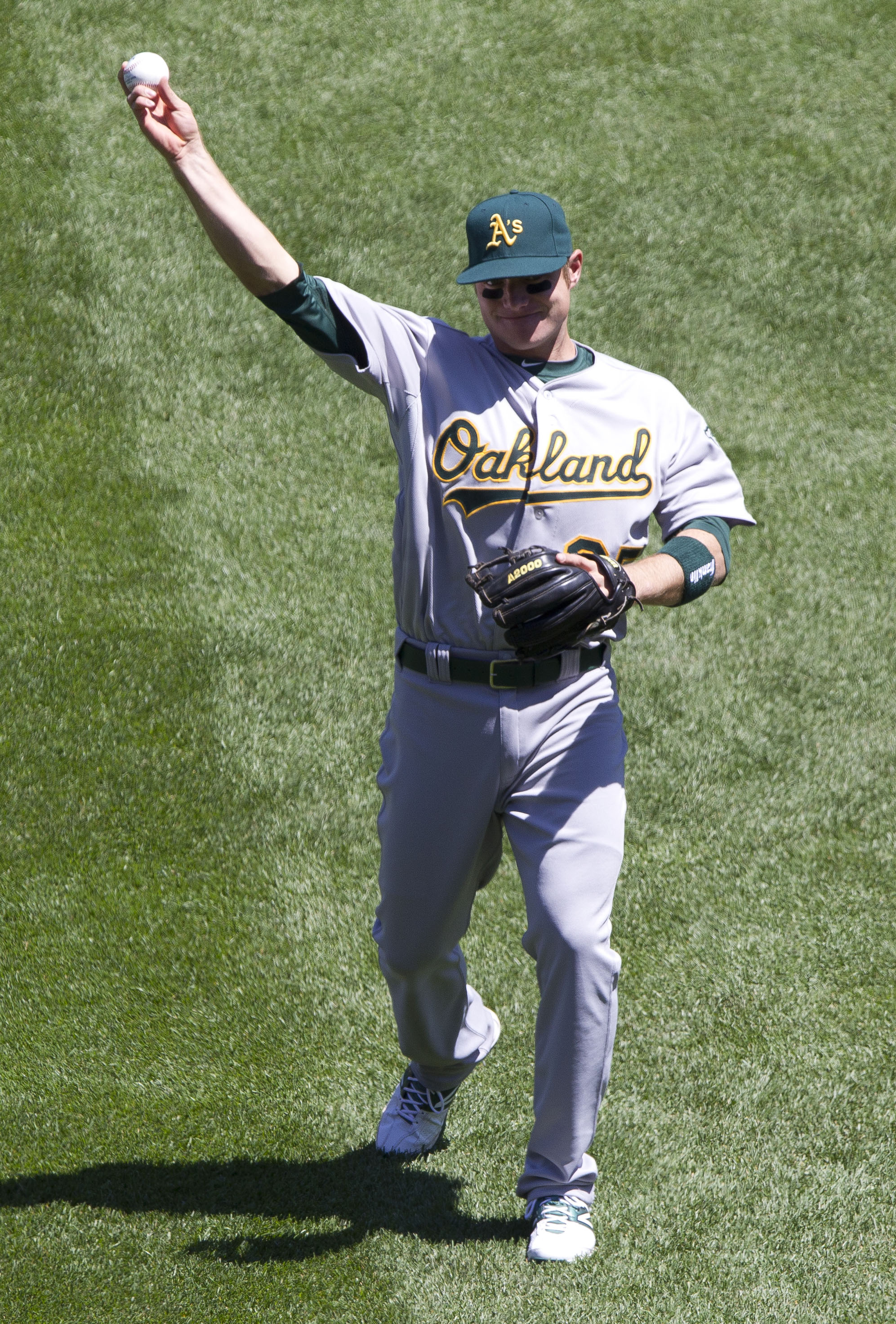
- Hughes with the Oakland Athletics
- Infielder / Outfielder
- Born: 2 August 1984 (age 41); Perth, Western Australia
- Batted: Right Threw: Right

MLB debut
- April 28, 2010, for the Minnesota Twins

Last MLB appearance
- April 29, 2012, for the Oakland Athletics

MLB statistics
- Batting average: .218
- Home runs: 8
- Runs batted in: 33
- Stats at Baseball Reference

Teams
- Minnesota Twins (2010–2012); Oakland Athletics (2012)
Medals
Men's baseball
Representing Australia
Haarlem Baseball Week
Bronze medal – third place	2016 Haarlem	National team

Luke Trevor Hughes (born 2 August 1984) is an Australian former professional baseball infielder. He played in Major League Baseball (MLB) for the Minnesota Twins and Oakland Athletics and in international competition for the Australia national baseball team. Hughes currently has the most career home runs in the Australian Baseball League upon his retirement following the 2019–20 Australian Baseball League season with 60.

== Career ==
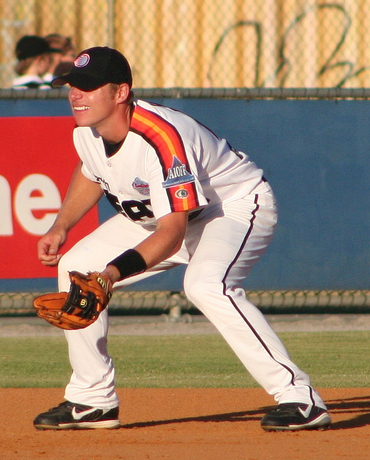
Hughes playing for the Perth Heat in the 2009 Claxton Shield Final on 7 February 2009.

Hughes played the 2001/2002 season in the International Baseball League of Australia, where he was named as the All-Star second baseman.

He helped the Perth Heat win the 2003 Claxton Shield with a .429 batting average. He also won the Golden Glove in the 2004 Claxton Shield. He currently plays for the Melbourne Aces in the Australian Baseball League and grew up playing for the Morley Eagles Baseball Club.

=== Minnesota Twins ===
He was then signed to the Minnesota Twins early 2002. He debuted professionally a year later with the GCL Twins, reaching base safely in 19 straight games at one point. He was named to the Gulf Coast League All-Star team at third base. In 2004, he moved to the Elizabethton Twins and played second base.

After two seasons with the New Britain Rock Cats and appearances for the 2007 and 2008 Eastern League All-Star team, he was promoted to AAA with the Rochester Red Wings. He also played in the 2008 All-Star Futures Game and was the only Australian that played for the World team.

On April 24, 2010, he was called up to the Minnesota Twins Major League roster as Nick Punto was sent to the DL.

On April 28, 2010 he debuted for the Twins at third base. In his first Major League at bat he hit a home run against Detroit Tigers pitcher Max Scherzer. In comparison, hitting a first at bat home run is twice as rare as throwing a no-hitter. Hughes' home run was calculated to have gone 360 feet. He is the 106th person in MLB history to homer in his first major league at-bat dating back to 1855 (less than once per season: .68), and was the 2nd to do so during the 2010 season (the first was Jason Heyward). Six other Twins have homered in their first at-bat: Rick Renick (1968), Dave McKay (1975), Gary Gaetti (1981), Andre David (1984), and Eddie Rosario (2015).

=== Oakland Athletics ===
On April 22, 2012, he was claimed off of waivers by the Oakland Athletics to make room on the Twins roster for RHP Jason Marquis. However, 8 days later, Hughes was designated for assignment when Brandon Inge was signed. Hughes was 1–13 in 4 games with Oakland while striking out 6 times. He was released on 17 July.

=== Toronto Blue Jays ===
On August 1, 2012, the Toronto Blue Jays signed Hughes and assigned him to their AAA affiliate Las Vegas 51s, playing 28 games and hitting .314/.392/.543 in his final stint of affiliated baseball.

=== Lancaster Barnstormers ===
On June 8, 2015, Hughes signed with the Lancaster Barnstormers of the Atlantic League of Professional Baseball and finished out the season with the club, hitting .240/.308/.422 in 78 games with 12 homeruns.

=== Perth Heat ===
After debuting for the Western Heelers in the 2002 International Baseball League of Australia season being named in the post-season All-Star team at second base as a 17-year-old. With the folding of the privately owned IBLA, the team reverted to the Claxton Shield, where he would hit .429 in 2003. Hughes would continue to have success in the Australian competition, winning a gold glove in 2004 before helping the now rebranded Perth Heat to championships in the 2008 and 2009 Claxton Shields, hitting .439 and five homeruns in the latter, being named in the All Star team at 3B and the Championship MVP.

In 2010, the Australian Baseball League was formed and Hughes fresh off his MLB debut was the biggest name on the Heat roster. He hit .337/.448/.616 in the leagues inaugural season, leading the team to a championship. The following season, he only played in 19 games, but hit .344/.500/.656 as the team defended their title, going back to back.

With Hughes in the team, the Heat would make three more Championship Series appearances, winning two of them.

=== Melbourne Aces ===
For the 2018–19 Australian Baseball League season, Hughes along with Heat teammate Allan de San Miguel moved to the Melbourne Aces. The Aces were knocked out in the wild card game by the Canberra Cavalry. On the 15th of January, 2020 after 322 games, Hughes announced his retirement. He leads the league in homeruns (59) and runs (217).

== Australian National Team ==
Hughes played for Australia in the 2005 Baseball World Cup where he batted 1 for 15. Again he played in the 2006 World Baseball Classic going 0 from 3. In 2006, he picked up his form in the Intercontinental Cup, the Australian batted .455 and slugged .755. In 5 games at second and four at third, he was error-free.

Hughes hit .333 for Australia in the 2007 Baseball World Cup. Hughes tied a game against the Dutch national team with a 9th-inning sacrifice fly. Against the Venezuela national team, Luke cracked a 3-run homer in the bottom of the 11th to win the game. He broke open a tie game against Team Canada in the top of the 9th with a double and the go-ahead run. America's Jayson Nix beat him out for All-Star honours at second base in the tournament.

On February 20, 2018, he was selected exhibition series against Japan.

On October 8, 2019, he was selected to the 2019 WBSC Premier12.

== Awards and highlights ==
- Home Run in first major league at-bat
