= Scott Mitchinson =

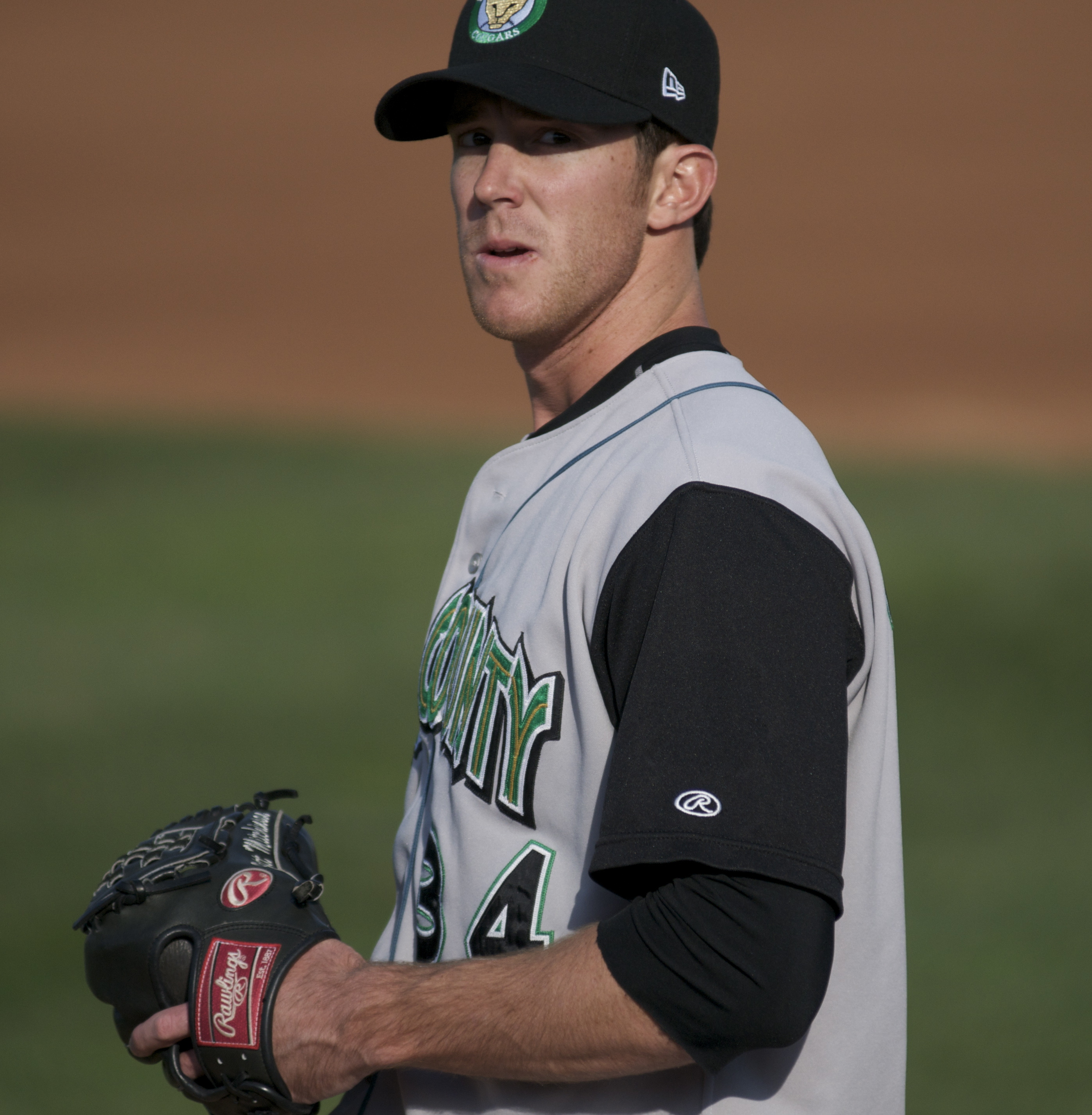
- Mitchinson with the Kane County Cougars in 2008

Melbourne Aces – No. 35
- Pitcher
- Born: 28 December 1985 (age 40); Perth, Australia
- Bats: Right Throws: Right
- Stats at Baseball Reference
Medals
Men's baseball
Representing Australia
Haarlem Baseball Week
Bronze medal – third place	2016 Haarlem	National team

Scott Michael Mitchinson (born 28 December 1984 in Perth, Western Australia) is an Australian professional baseball player for the Perth Heat of the Australian Baseball League.

== Professional career ==
Mitchinson debuted for the Western Australia Heelers in the 2002 Claxton Shield as a 17-year-old and went on to play in the 2003 Claxton Shield. The Philadelphia Phillies signed him that year.

After playing in the 2004 Claxton Shield he made his professional debut in the US minor leagues, with the GCL Phillies. He went 7–0 with a 1.75 ERA, walking a single batter in 61^{2/3} IP while striking out 60. He led the Gulf Coast League in innings, tied Luis Valdez for the win lead, was three strikeouts behind leader Gabriel Sosa and was second to Gaby Hernandez in ERA. That earned him the nod as the All-Star starting pitcher for the 2004 GCL. Baseball America rated him as the league's No. 20 prospect, second on his club's staff behind Carlos Carrasco.

Spending almost the entire season with the Batavia Muckdogs in 2005, he was 5–6 with a 5.35 ERA. In 2006, Scott was a more refined 1–1 with a 1.12 ERA for the Perth Heat in the 2006 Claxton Shield after having sat out the 2005 tournament.

Mitchinson spent most of the next season with the Lakewood BlueClaws (3–3, 3.96)and in 2007, the right-hander split time between the GCL Phils (0–1, 2.79), Williamsport Crosscutters (0–2, 3.21) and Lakewood (3–3, 4.12). Mitchinson then debuted for the Australia national baseball team, going 1–0 with a 2.35 ERA in the 2007 Baseball World Cup, getting the win over the Germany national baseball team. That winter, he was traded to the Oakland Athletics in the minor league portion of the Rule 5 draft.

Scott was 0–1, 2.77 for the Perth Heat in the 2008 Claxton Shield after having skipped 2007. He then was back with the Australian team for the 2008 Final Olympic Qualification Tournament, posting a 1.23 ERA in two relief stints, against Germany and South Africa with a save against Germany. Despite this, Australia failed to qualify.

In his first year in Oakland, Scott pitched for the Kane County Cougars (5–3, 1.74) and the Stockton Ports (1–0, 1.69). He made the Midwest League mid-season All-Star team. Mitchinson was on Australia's provisional roster for the 2009 World Baseball Classic and was a very late addition to their final roster after Ryan Rowland-Smith pulled out. He only threw two defensive outs in the Classic, but no runs were conceded off his pitching.
