= Joshua Hill =

Joshua or Josh Hill may refer to:

- Joshua Hill (baseball) (born 1983), Australian baseball player
- Joshua Hill (Pitcairn Island leader) (1773–c. 1844), American adventurer
- Joshua Hill (politician) (1812–1891), American politician
- Josh Hill (footballer) (born 1989), Australian footballer
- Josh Hill (racing driver) (born 1991), third generation British racing driver
- Josh Hill (rugby union) (born 1999), New Zealand rugby union player
- Josh Hill (American football) (born 1990), American football player
- Josh Hill (fighter) (born 1986), Canadian mixed martial artist
- Josh Hill (DJ Manian), pseudonym of DJ Manian.
