= Joshua Hill (baseball) =

Australian professional baseball pitcher (born 1983)

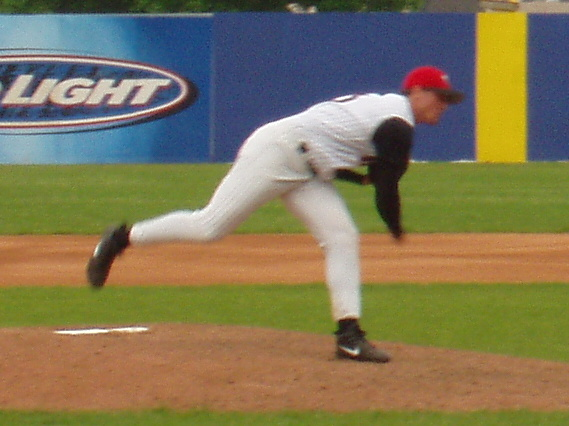
- Hill with the Quad City River Bandits in 2003
- Pitcher
- Born: 27 March 1983 (age 43); Armadale, Western Australia
- Bats: Right Throws: Right
- Stats at Baseball Reference

Teams
- New South Wales Patriots (2001 - 2003); National Team: Australia (2006 - 2009)

Joshua James Hill (born 27 March 1983 in Armadale, Western Australia) is an Australian professional baseball pitcher.

== Professional career ==
=== Minnesota Twins ===
Hill was signed to the Minnesota Twins organisation in 2000 and debuted with the Gulf Coast League Twins in 2001, going 2–2 with a 3.63 ERA in his first season.

In the 2002 International Baseball League of Australia season, he went 1–0 including a save, pitching six scoreless innings for the New South Wales Patriots. He split the minor league season between the Quad City River Bandits, Elizabethton Twins GCL Twins.

In the 2003 Claxton Shield, Hill pitched another four scoreless innings for New South Wales, while allowing only one hit. Hill had right shoulder surgery in '03 and did not play in 2004.

Hill was included in Australia national baseball team for the 2006 World Baseball Classic, replacing the injured Ryan Rowland-Smith. He pitched one game, coming in for Damian Moss. In 2006, he was 6–6 with a 4.88 ERA for Fort Myers Miracle. In 2007, he was promoted to the New Britain Rock Cats, and in the 2007 Baseball World Cup, he pitched four games for Australia.

=== Pittsburgh Pirates ===
Hill was selected by the Pittsburgh Pirates in the Rule 5 Draft that off-season. He was assigned to the Altoona Curve and pitched 4–11 with a 4.53 ERA in 2008. He was on Australia's roster for the 2009 World Baseball Classic but did not play.
