= Fifth Third Field =

Fifth Third Field is the name or former name of several minor league ballparks.

- Fifth Third Field (Toledo, Ohio), a minor league baseball stadium
- Fifth Third Field (Dayton, Ohio), now known as Day Air Ballpark

== See also ==
- Fifth Third Park, a minor league ballpark in Spartanburg, South Carolina
- Fifth Third Stadium, a stadium in Kennesaw, Georgia
- LMCU Ballpark, Comstock Park, Michigan, formerly known as Fifth Third Ballpark
- Northwestern Medicine Field, Geneva, Illinois, formerly known as Fifth Third Bank Ballpark
- Comerica Park, Detroit, Michigan, which will be renamed Fifth Third Park in 2027
