= Hunter Cervenka =

American baseball player (born 1990)

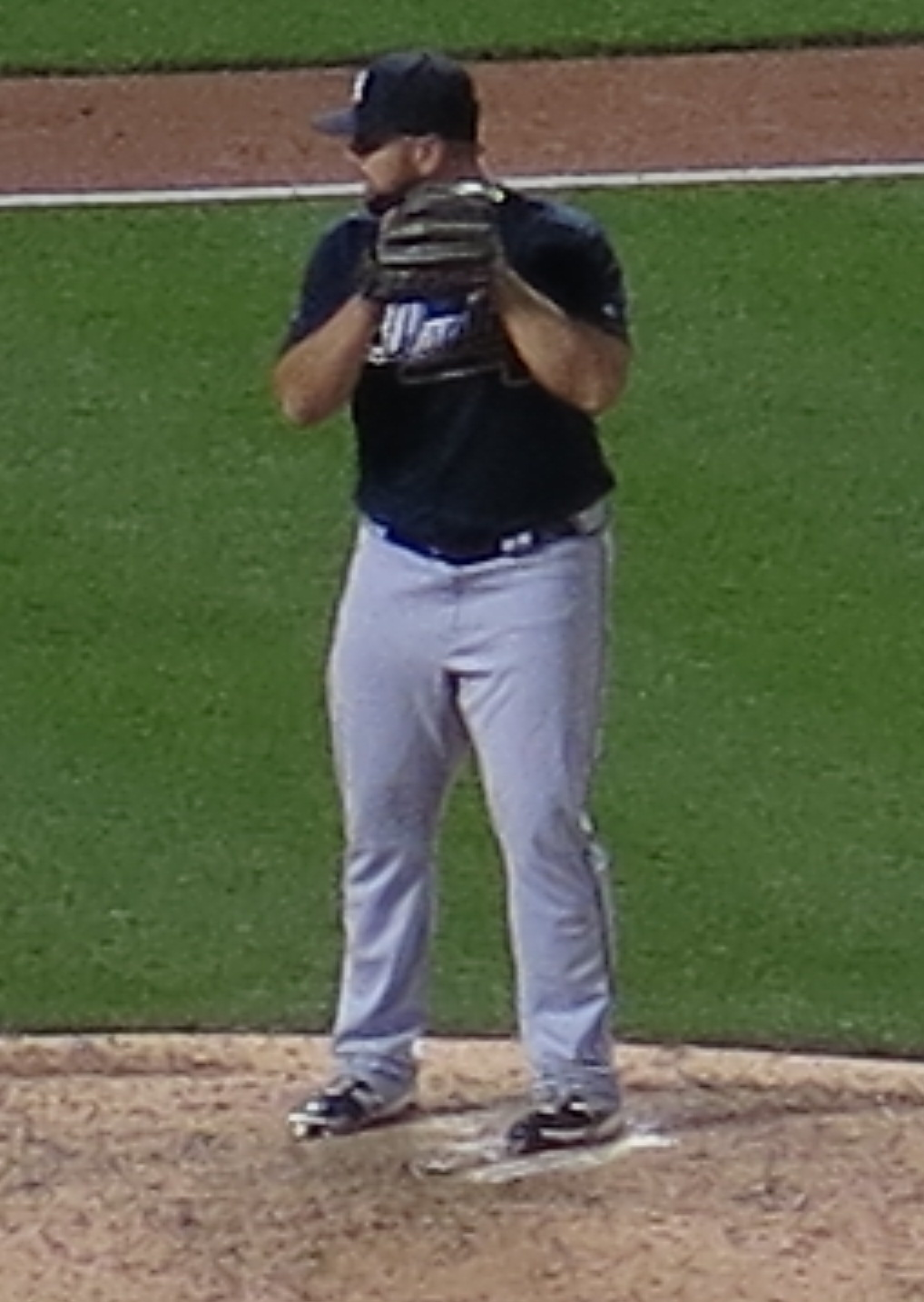
- Cervenka with the Braves in 2016
- Pitcher
- Born: January 3, 1990 (age 36); Baytown, Texas, U.S.
- Batted: Left Threw: Left

MLB debut
- April 12, 2016, for the Atlanta Braves

Last appearance
- August 9, 2017, for the Miami Marlins

MLB statistics
- Win–loss record: 1–0
- Earned run average: 4.69
- Strikeouts: 48
- Stats at Baseball Reference

Teams
- Atlanta Braves (2016); Miami Marlins (2016–2017)

Colby Hunter Cervenka (born January 3, 1990) is an American former professional baseball pitcher. He played in Major League Baseball (MLB) for the Atlanta Braves and Miami Marlins.

== Career ==
=== Boston Red Sox ===
Cervenka was drafted by the Boston Red Sox in the 27th round, 832nd overall, of the 2008 Major League Baseball draft out of Ross S. Sterling High School in Baytown, Texas. Cervenka made his professional debut with the rookie-level GCL Red Sox in 2009, recording a 2–2 record and 4.84 ERA in 11 appearances. The next year, Cervenka played for the Low-A Lowell Spinners, posting a 2–4 record and 3.59 ERA with 55 strikeouts in 62.2 innings pitched. In 2011, he split the season between Lowell and the Single-A Greenville Drive, struggling to a cumulative 2–10 record and 7.93 ERA in 22 games between the two teams. He was assigned to Greenville to begin the 2012 season.

=== Chicago Cubs ===
On May 15, 2012, Cervenka was traded to the Chicago Cubs as the player to be named later in a previous trade in which the Red Sox acquired Marlon Byrd. He spent the remainder of the season split between the Single-A Peoria Chiefs and the High-A Daytona Cubs, accumulating 47 strikeouts in as many innings. He split the 2013 season between Daytona and the Double-A Tennessee Smokies, logging a cumulative 6–1 record and 3.00 ERA in 41 appearances between the two teams. Cervenka returned to Tennessee in 2014, pitching to a 4–4 record and 3.79 ERA with 65 strikeouts in 61.2 innings pitched. He was invited to major league Spring Training in 2015, but did not make the club and was assigned to Tennessee, later receiving a promotion to the Triple-A Iowa Cubs after 3 stellar games in Double-A. After struggling to an 11.08 ERA in 12 appearances for Iowa, the Cubs organization released Cervenka on May 29, 2015,

=== Sugar Land Skeeters ===
On June 12, 2015, Cervenka signed with the Sugar Land Skeeters of the Atlantic League of Professional Baseball. In 8 games for the Skeeters, Cervenka logged 8.0 scoreless innings, allowing only 4 hits while striking out 12.

=== Atlanta Braves ===
On July 7, 2015, Cervenka signed a minor league contract with the Atlanta Braves organization. He was assigned to the Triple-A Gwinnett Braves, where he posted 16.2 scoreless innings, also throwing 4.0 scoreless innings for the Double-A Mississippi Braves.

Cervenka was invited to spring training in 2016, but started the season with Double-A Mississippi. On April 11, 2016, Cervenka was selected to the 40-man roster and promoted to the majors for the first time. He made his MLB debut the next day, allowing a single to Washington Nationals infielder Daniel Murphy, the only batter he faced. In 50 games for the Braves, Cervenka pitched to a neat 3.18 ERA with 35 strikeouts in 34.0 innings of work.

=== Miami Marlins ===
On August 6, 2016, the Braves traded Cervenka to the Miami Marlins in exchange for Anfernee Seymour and Michael Mader. In 18 games for Miami in 2016, he logged a 4.82 ERA with 7 strikeouts in 11 innings of work, also spending brief time with the Triple-A New Orleans Zephyrs and the Double-A Jacksonville Suns. On April 14, 2017, Cervenka, while playing in Triple-A pitched the 8th innings of a combined no-hitter against the Iowa Cubs, with Scott Copeland pitching the first 7 innings and Brandon Cunniff pitching a perfect ninth. In 2017, Cervenka split the year between Miami and the Triple-A New Orleans Baby Cakes, posting an ugly 15.43 ERA in 5 major league appearances on the year. Cervenka was designated for assignment by the Marlins on December 14, 2017. After clearing waivers, he was outrighted to Triple-A on December 21. He was released by the organization on March 8, 2018.

=== Baltimore Orioles ===
On March 13, 2018, Cervenka signed a minor league contract with the Baltimore Orioles organization. On March 30, the Orioles released Cervenka.

=== Sugar Land Skeeters (second stint) ===
On April 19, 2018, Cervenka signed with the Sugar Land Skeeters of the Atlantic League of Professional Baseball. In 19 games for Sugar Land, Cervenka pitched to a 3–1 record and a nice 1.53 ERA with 21 strikeouts in 17.2 innings pitched.

=== Detroit Tigers ===
On June 3, 2018, Cervenka's contract was purchased by the Detroit Tigers organization. He split the remainder of the season between the High-A Lakeland Flying Tigers, the Double-A Erie SeaWolves, and the Triple-A Toledo Mud Hens, accumulating a 3–2 record and 1.77 ERA in 29 games between the three teams. Cervenka elected free agency following the season on November 2.

=== St. Louis Cardinals ===
On November 6, 2018, Cervenka signed a minor league deal with the St. Louis Cardinals organization. He was assigned to the Triple-A Memphis Redbirds to begin the season. After posting a 2.95 ERA in 36 appearances with the team, Cervenka was released on July 30, 2019.

=== Baltimore Orioles (second stint) ===
On August 7, 2019, Cervenka signed a minor league contract with the Baltimore Orioles. He finished the year with the Triple-A Norfolk Tides, recording a 2.25 ERA with 18 strikeouts in 12.0 innings pitched. Cervenka did not play in a minor league game in 2020 due to the cancellation of the minor league season because of the COVID-19 pandemic. Cervenka was released by the Orioles organization on July 17, 2020.

=== Sugar Land Skeeters (third stint) ===
On August 1, 2020, Cervenka signed on to play for the Sugar Land Skeeters of the Constellation Energy League (a makeshift 4-team independent league created as a result of the COVID-19 pandemic) for the 2020 season. In 9 appearances for the Skeeters in 2020, Cervenka posted a 4–1 record and 3.97 ERA .

=== West Virginia Power ===
On February 27, 2021, Cervenka signed with the Tri-City ValleyCats of the Frontier League. On April 15, 2021, Cervenka was traded to the West Virginia Power of the Atlantic League of Professional Baseball in exchange for a player to be named later. In 7 appearances for the Power, Cervenka recorded a 9.39 ERA with 4 strikeouts in 7.2 innings of work.

=== Long Island Ducks ===
On June 17, 2021, Cervenka was traded to the Long Island Ducks of the Atlantic League of Professional Baseball in exchange for a player to be named later.

=== Cleburne Railroaders ===
On February 28, 2022, Cervenka was traded to the Cleburne Railroaders of the American Association for future considerations. Cervenka recorded a 5–0 record and 1.27 ERA with 39 strikeouts in 26 appearances with the Railroaders. He was named an All-Star for the team in 2022.

=== Leones de Yucatán ===
On July 27, 2022, Cervenka signed with Leones de Yucatán of the Mexican League. In 3 relief appearances, he pitched to a 6.75 ERA over 2.2 innings. Cervenka won the Mexican League Championship with the Leones in 2022.

On March 30, 2023, Cervenka announced his retirement from professional baseball.
