= Anfernee Seymour =

Bahamian baseball player (born 1995)

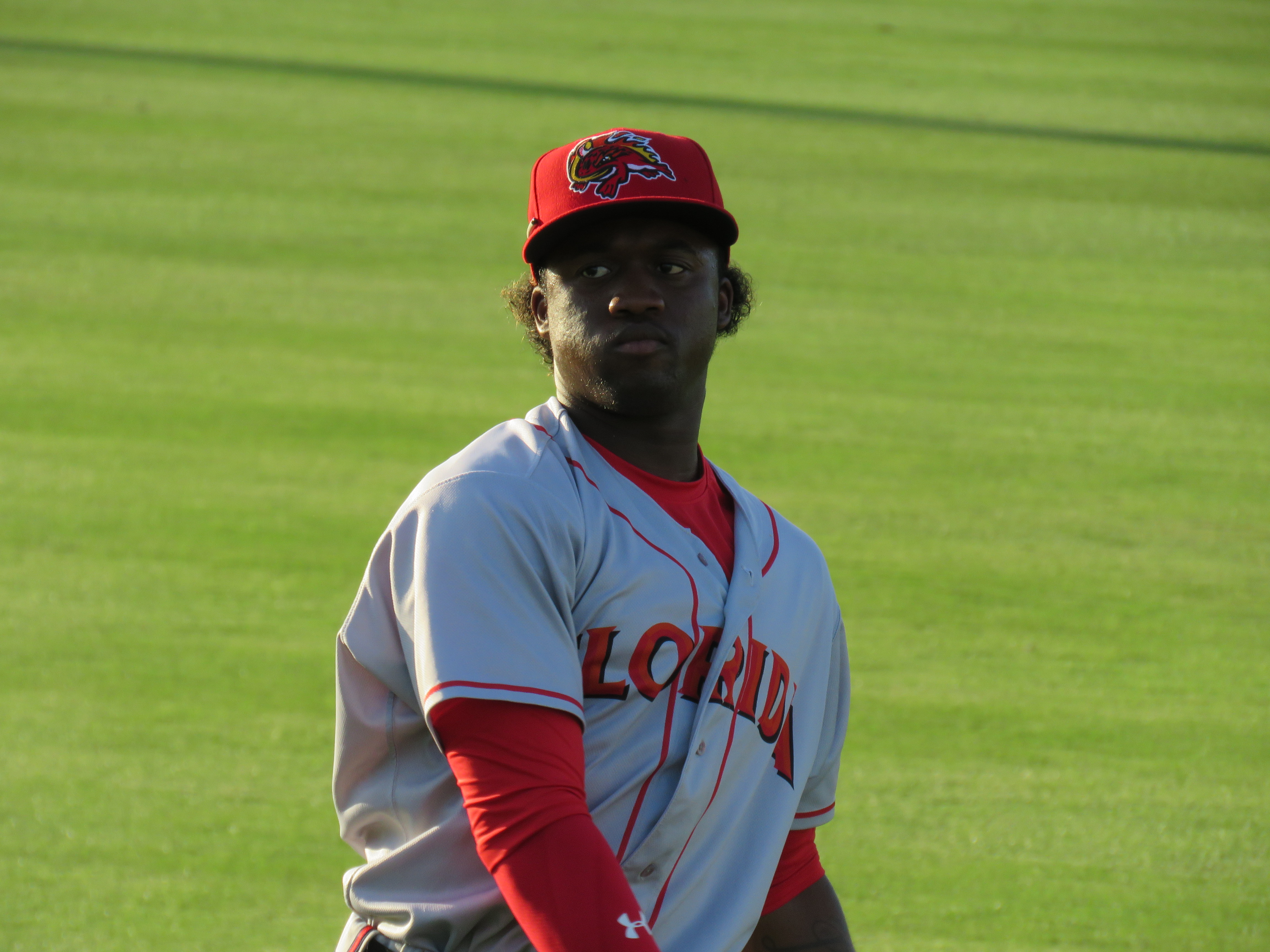
- Seymour with the Florida Fire Frogs
- Outfielder
- Born: June 24, 1995 (age 30); Nassau, The Bahamas
- Bats: Switch Throws: Right
- Stats at Baseball Reference

Anfernee J'Nero Seymour (born June 24, 1995) is a Bahamian former professional baseball outfielder. Seymour was drafted by the Miami Marlins in the 2014 Major League Baseball draft. Seymour has also represented Great Britain internationally.

== Career ==
=== Miami Marlins ===
Seymour attended American Heritage High School in Plantation, Florida. The Miami Marlins selected Seymour in the seventh round, with the 197th overall selection, of the 2014 MLB draft.

In 2015, Seymour played for the Batavia Muckdogs of the Low–A New York-Penn League. Seymour began the 2016 season with the Greensboro Grasshoppers of the Single–A South Atlantic League. While with the Grasshoppers, Seymour hit for a .252 batting average with 36 stolen bases.

=== Atlanta Braves ===
On August 6, 2016, the Marlins traded Seymour and Michael Mader to the Atlanta Braves for Hunter Cervenka. Seymour finished 2016 with the Rome Braves and ended the 2016 season batting .257 with 43 stolen bases. He started the 2017 season in Rome before a promotion to the Florida Fire Frogs in May. At the High–A level, Seymour hit .280/.341/.358 in 82 games. At the end of the 2017 minor league season, Seymour was assigned to the Peoria Javelinas. However, Seymour was suspended and removed from the team's roster before the Arizona Fall League began play. Seymour began 2018 with Florida but was released from the Braves organization on May 6, 2018.

=== Miami Marlins (second stint) ===
On May 10, 2018, Seymour signed a minor league contract with the Miami Marlins and was assigned to the High–A Jupiter Hammerheads. In June, he was promoted to the Triple–A Jacksonville Jumbo Shrimp. In 100 games between Florida, Jupiter and Jacksonville, he hit .257 with four home runs, 35 RBI, and 24 stolen bases.

Seymour returned to Jacksonville in 2019, and hit .261/.314/.333 with one home run, 28 RBI, and 17 stolen bases. Seymour elected free agency following the season on November 4, 2019.

=== Kane County Cougars ===
On March 3, 2021, Seymour signed with the Kane County Cougars of the American Association of Professional Baseball. In 86 appearances for the Cougars, he hit .231 with five home runs, 32 RBI, and was second in the American Association with 37 stolen bases. On September 8, Seymour was released by the Cougars.

=== Charleston Dirty Birds ===
On February 17, 2022, Seymour signed with the Charleston Dirty Birds of the Atlantic League of Professional Baseball. In 79 games for the Dirty Birds, he hit .253/.317/.387 with six home runs, 36 RBI, and 24 stolen bases.

=== Long Island Ducks ===
On August 19, 2022, Seymour was traded to the Long Island Ducks of the Atlantic League of Professional Baseball. In 14 games for the Ducks, he slashed .255/.327/.447 with one home run, eight RBI, and six stolen bases. Seymour became a free agent after the season.

== International career ==
Seymour was selected to represent Great Britain at the 2023 World Baseball Classic qualification and the 2023 World Baseball Classic.
