= Joey Newby =

Amarillo Sox
- Pitcher
- Born: March 8, 1982 (age 44); Soldotna, Alaska, U.S.
- Bats: Right Throws: Right

Joseph Eric Newby (born March 8, 1982) is an American professional baseball pitcher who is currently with the Amarillo Sox. Newby attended Colorado State University–Pueblo.

== Professional career ==
=== Oakland Athletics ===
Newby started his career in 2004, joining the Rookie-Level affiliate of the Oakland Athletics, the AZL Athletics of the Arizona League. Newby went 2–3 with a 4.04 ERA and 46 strikeouts.

In 2005 Newby was promoted to the Vancouver Canadians of the Northwest League. There he compiled a record of 5–5 in 15 starts with a 4.29 ERA.

Newby worked his way up the A's organization to the Class-A Kane County Cougars of the Midwest League in 2006. In his 32 games (all relief appearances), he had a record of 5–0 with a 3.22 ERA.

In 2007 the A's kept him at the Class-A with Kane County. This was Newby's worst season statistically, compiling a 0–3 record and an ERA of 8.59 for only nine games.

=== Seattle Mariners ===
Newby did not pitch in 2008 after tearing a ligament in his pitching arm. As a result, he was released by the A's. He then signed a minor league contract with the Seattle Mariners at the start of the 2009. He played at three levels of the Mariners organization, with the Class-A Advanced High Desert Mavericks, the Double-A West Tenn Diamond Jaxx and the Triple-A Tacoma Rainiers. He is just the third player from Colorado State - Pueblo to reach the Triple-A level. He finished the season a combined 1–1 with a 2.38 ERA and 40 strikeouts in 34 games.

=== Los Angeles Dodgers ===
After spending 2010 with the Southern Maryland Blue Crabs in independent baseball, he signed a minor league contract with the Los Angeles Dodgers before the 2011 season. He was assigned to the Double-A Chattanooga Lookouts. After seven games in AA, he was promoted to the Triple-A Albuquerque Isotopes, where he was in 25 games, including 5 starts. Combined he was 4–7 with a 5.55 ERA.
