= Jack Anderson (baseball, born 1994) =

American baseball player (born 1994)

- Pitcher
- Born: January 10, 1994 (age 32); Chicago, Illinois, U.S.
- Bats: Right Throws: Right
- Stats at Baseball Reference

Jack Donald Anderson (born January 10, 1994) is an American former professional baseball pitcher. Anderson is a submarine pitcher.

== Playing career ==
=== Amateur career ===
Anderson attended Evanston Township High School in Evanston, Illinois. Undrafted out of high school, Anderson attended Pennsylvania State University and played four years of college baseball for the Nittany Lions. In 2015, he played collegiate summer baseball with the Cotuit Kettleers of the Cape Cod Baseball League. In his senior season of 2016, he pitched to a 2.14 ERA and 13 saves in 54 2/3 innings. Anderson set Penn State school records for career saves (25), appearances (98), and single-season saves (13).

=== Seattle Mariners ===
Anderson was drafted by the Seattle Mariners in the 23rd round, with the 687th overall selection, of the 2016 Major League Baseball draft, and signed with them.

Anderson split his first professional season between the rookie-level Arizona League Mariners and Low-A Everett AquaSox, going 3–1 with a 1.71 ERA and 18 strikeouts over 21 innings. He split the 2017 season between the Single-A Clinton LumberKings and High-A Modesto Nuts, going a combined 3–5 with a 2.51 ERA and 75 strikeouts over 71 2/3 innings. Strickland spent the 2018 season with Modesto, going 2–4 with a 2.68 ERA and 57 strikeouts over 53 2/3 innings, and was the recipient of the Mariners 2018 “60 ft. 6 in. Club” award. Anderson spent the 2019 season with the Double-A Arkansas Travelers, going 4–2 with a 1.50 ERA and 51 strikeouts over 54 innings.

Anderson did not play in a game in 2020 due to the cancellation of the minor league season because of the COVID-19 pandemic. Anderson would return to the Travelers for the 2021 season going 0–3 with a 5.75 ERA and 32 strikeouts over 51 2/3 innings. On November 12, 2021, Anderson was released by the Mariners organization.

=== Kane County Cougars ===
On April 4, 2022, Anderson signed with the Kane County Cougars of the American Association of Professional Baseball. In 46 games out of the bullpen, he compiled a 6–2 record and 4.24 ERA with 67 strikeouts across 63 2/3 innings pitched. On October 26, Anderson was released by the Cougars.

=== Long Island Ducks ===
On July 16, 2023, Anderson signed with the Long Island Ducks of the Atlantic League of Professional Baseball. In 18 relief outings for the Ducks, he recorded a 4.24 ERA with 18 strikeouts across 17 innings of work. Anderson became a free agent following the season.

== Coaching career ==
Anderson signed with Athletes Untapped as a private baseball coach on June 6, 2024.

== Personal life ==
Anderson graduated from Penn State's Smeal College of Business with a degree in supply chain and information systems.
