= Robby Martin =

American baseball player (born 1999)

- Outfielder
- Born: August 17, 1999 (age 26); Tampa, Florida, U.S.
- Bats: Left Throws: Right

Robert Douglas Martin Jr. (born August 17, 1999) is an American professional baseball outfielder. He played college baseball for the Florida State Seminoles.

== Amateur career ==
Martin was born and grew up in Tampa, Florida and attended Thomas Jefferson High School. As a senior, he batted .453 with four home runs and 24 RBIs as Jefferson won the Class 6A state championship. Martin was selected in the 37th round of the 2018 Major League Baseball draft by the Miami Marlins, but did not sign with the team.

Martin played in 63 games as a true freshman and batted .315 with 17 doubles, four home runs, and 54 RBIs. He was named the Atlantic Coast Conference All-Freshman team and a Freshman All American by the Collegiate Baseball Newspaper. In 2019, he played collegiate summer baseball with the Cotuit Kettleers of the Cape Cod Baseball League. He slashed .324/.439/.412 with 14 RBIs and ten runs scored through 17 games of his sophomore season before it was cut short due to the coronavirus pandemic. Martin entered his junior season on the watch list for the Golden Spikes Award. Martin finished the season with a .260 batting average, 11 home runs, and 51 RBIs and was named third team All-ACC.

== Professional career ==
=== Colorado Rockies ===
Martin was selected in the eighth round with the 230th overall pick in the 2021 Major League Baseball draft by the Colorado Rockies. He split his first professional season with the rookie-level Arizona Complex League Rockies and Single-A Fresno Grizzlies, batting .256 with three home runs and 12 RBI over 25 games. Martin spent the 2022 season with the High-A Spokane Indians, slashing .212/.266/.345 with five home runs, 36 RBI, and three stolen bases across 85 appearances.

Martin split the 2023 campaign between Fresno and Spokane, playing in 96 total games and hitting .265/.320/.407 with career-highs in home runs (7), RBI (42), and stolen bases (16). He returned to Spokane for the 2024 season, making 66 appearances and batting .248/.306/.348 with six home runs, 36 RBI, and five stolen bases. Martin was released by the Rockies organization on March 23, 2025.

=== Kane County Cougars ===
On May 17, 2025, Martin signed with the Kane County Cougars of the American Association of Professional Baseball. In 59 appearances for the Cougars, he batted .198/.265/.320 with six home runs, 20 RBI, and one stolen base. With Kane County, Martin won the American Association championship.
