= Levi Kelly =

American baseball player (born 1999)

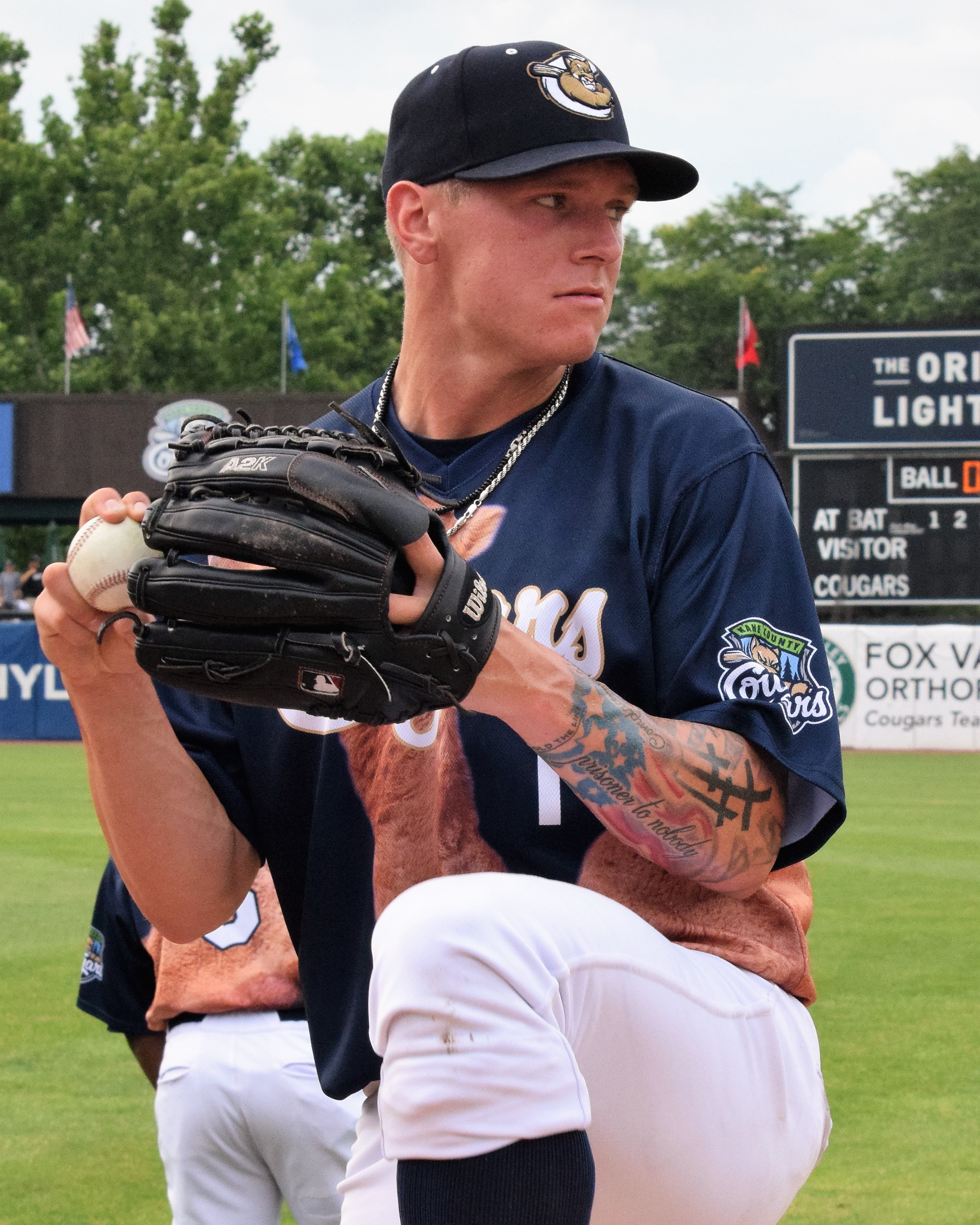
- Kelly with Kane County in 2019
- Pitcher
- Born: May 14, 1999 (age 26); St. Albans, West Virginia, U.S.
- Bats: Right Throws: Right

Levi Hunter Kelly (born May 14, 1999) is an American former professional baseball pitcher.

== Amateur career ==
Kelly began his high school career at Nitro High School in Nitro, West Virginia. As a freshman, he committed to play college baseball at Louisiana State University. Following his freshman year, he transferred to IMG Academy in Bradenton, Florida. After his sophomore year at IMG, he transferred to Bishop Verot High School in Fort Myers, Florida. In 2017, as a junior, he went 7–1 with a 0.62 ERA and 98 strikeouts over 56 innings. Following his junior year, he transferred back to IMG Academy for his senior season.

== Professional career ==
After his senior year, Kelly was drafted by the Arizona Diamondbacks in the eighth round of the 2018 Major League Baseball draft.

Kelly signed with the Diamondbacks, and made his professional debut with the Arizona League Diamondbacks of the Rookie-league, pitching six scoreless innings. In 2019, Kelly spent the season with the Kane County Cougars of the Single-A Midwest League. Over 22 starts, he pitched to a 5–1 record with a 2.15 ERA, striking out 126 over 100 1/3 innings. Kelly did not play a minor league game in 2020 due to the cancellation of the minor league because of the COVID-19 pandemic.

After recovering from a shoulder injury that forced him to miss the first month of the 2021 season, he was assigned to the Amarillo Sod Poodles of the Double-A Central. In mid-August, after struggling to a 5.40 ERA over 25 innings pitched in relief, he was placed on the development list, where he finished the year. He returned to Amarillo to begin the 2022 season, but pitched only one inning due to injury. Kelly began the 2023 season with the High-A Hillsboro Hops, but struggled to an 11.05 ERA with two strikeouts in 7 1/3 innings pitched. He was released on May 4, 2023.

== Coaching career ==
On February 6, 2026, Kelly was announced as the pitching coach for the Lansing Lugnuts, the High-A affiliate of the Athletics.
