= Kristian Robinson (baseball) =

Bahamian baseball player (born 2000)

Free agent
- Outfielder
- Born: December 11, 2000 (age 25); Nassau, The Bahamas
- Bats: Right Throws: Right
- Stats at Baseball Reference

Kristian Devaughn Robinson (born December 11, 2000) is a Bahamian professional baseball outfielder who is a free agent.

== Playing career ==
Robinson signed with the Arizona Diamondbacks as an international free agent in July 2017. He spent his first professional season in 2018 with the Arizona League Diamondbacks and Missoula Osprey, slashing .279/.363/.428 with seven home runs, 27 RBIs, and 12 stolen bases in 57 games. He started 2019 with the Hillsboro Hops before earning a promotion to the Kane County Cougars in August. Over 69 games between both teams, he batted .282 with 14 home runs, 51 RBIs, and 17 stolen bases. Robinson did not play in a game in 2020 due to the cancellation of the minor league season because of the COVID-19 pandemic. Robinson did not play in a game for the Diamondbacks organization in 2021, but was selected to the 40-man roster following the season on November 19.

After spending the 2021 and 2022 seasons on the restricted list, Robinson was activated on May 29, 2023, and optioned to the Single-A Visalia Rawhide. In 43 games split between the Rookie-level Arizona Complex League Diamondbacks, Visalia, and High-A Hillsboro, he batted a cumulative .271/.384/.452 with 7 home runs, 24 RBI, and 18 stolen bases. On August 12, Robinson was designated for assignment by the Diamondbacks following the promotion of Buddy Kennedy. Robinson cleared waivers and was assigned outright to the ACL Diamondbacks on August 17. He started the 2025 season with the Double-A Amarillo Sod Poodles and joined the Triple-A Reno Aces in late July. In 2025, between Double-A and Triple-A he played in 116 games batting .254/.371/.447 with 17 home runs, 60 RBIs and 34 stolen bases.

In 2026, Robinson played in 116 games with Triple-A Reno Aces he batted .268/.373/.442 with 15 home runs, 60 RBIs and 22 stolen bases. He elected free agency on November 2.

== Personal life ==
Robinson was arrested early in 2020 for allegedly punching an Arizona Department of Public Safety officer in the face after the officer found Robinson walking into traffic on Interstate 10. Robinson released a statement indicating he was suffering from mental health issues due in part to the pandemic. The start to his 2021 season was delayed because he remained in the Bahamas to deal with the resulting legal issues. On August 17, 2021, Robinson was sentenced to 18 months probation.
