= Kane County Cougars =

American baseball team

- Founded in 1991; Geneva, Illinois
Team logo
Cap insignia

Minor league affiliations
- Class: Independent (2021–present)
- Previous classes: Class A (1991–2020)
- League: National Association of Professional Baseball (2027–present)
- Previous leagues: Midwest League (1991–2020) American Association of Professional Baseball (2021-2026)

Major league affiliations
- Previous teams: Arizona Diamondbacks (2015–2020); Chicago Cubs (2013–2014); Kansas City Royals (2011–2012); Oakland Athletics (2003–2010); Florida Marlins (1993–2002); Baltimore Orioles (1991–1992)

Minor league titles
- League titles (4): 2001; 2014; 2024; 2025
- Division titles (7): 2001; 2004; 2006; 2014; 2019; 2024; 2025

Team data
- Name: Kane County Cougars (1991–present)
- Colors: Navy, tan, gray, white, bright green, light blue, light peach
- Ballpark: Northwestern Medicine Field (1991–present)
- Owner/ Operator: REV Entertainment
- General manager: Curtis Haug
- Manager: George Tsamis
- Website: kccougars.com

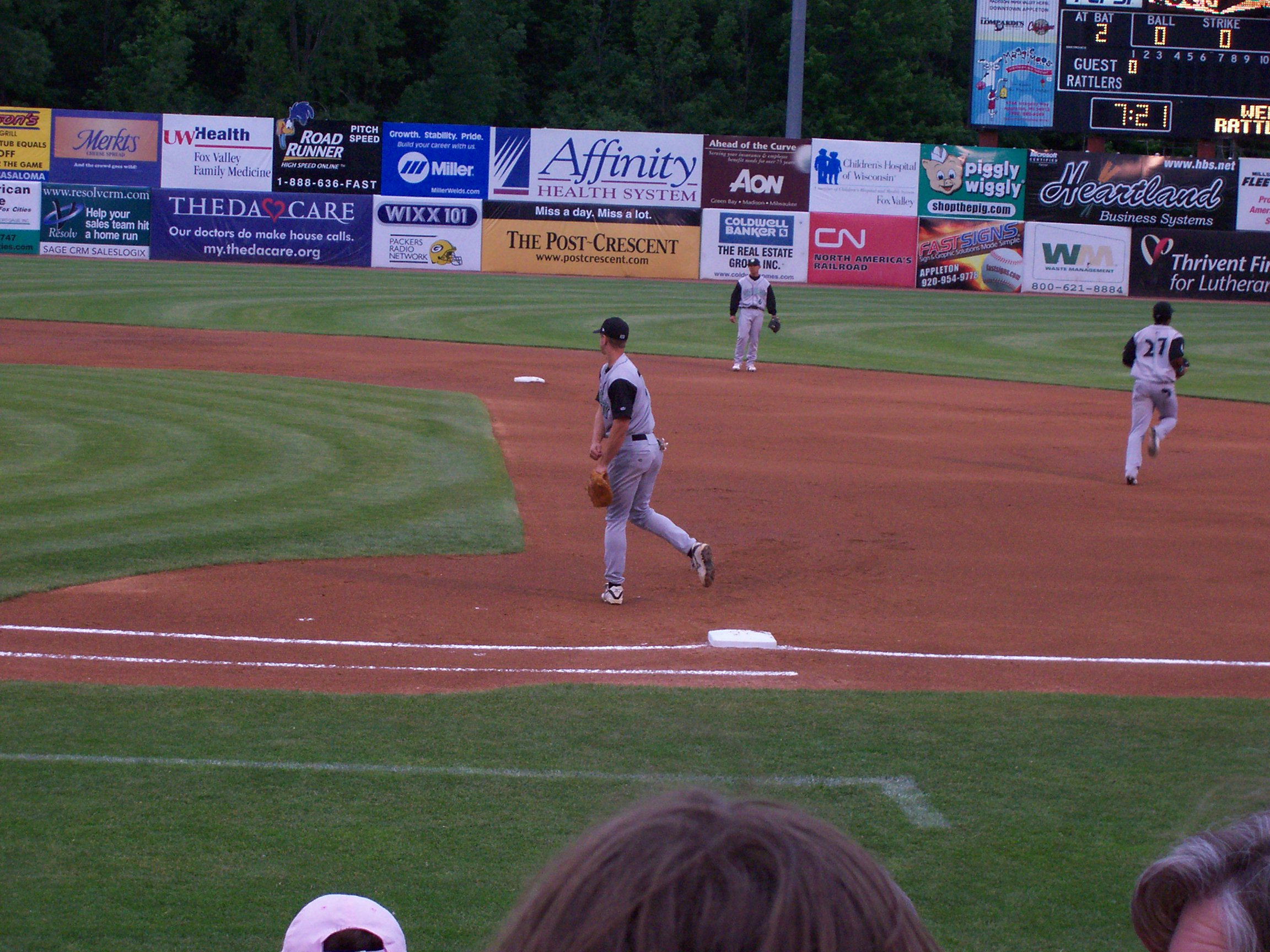
Kane County Cougars, playing the Wisconsin Timber Rattlers at Fox Cities Stadium on June 9, 2006

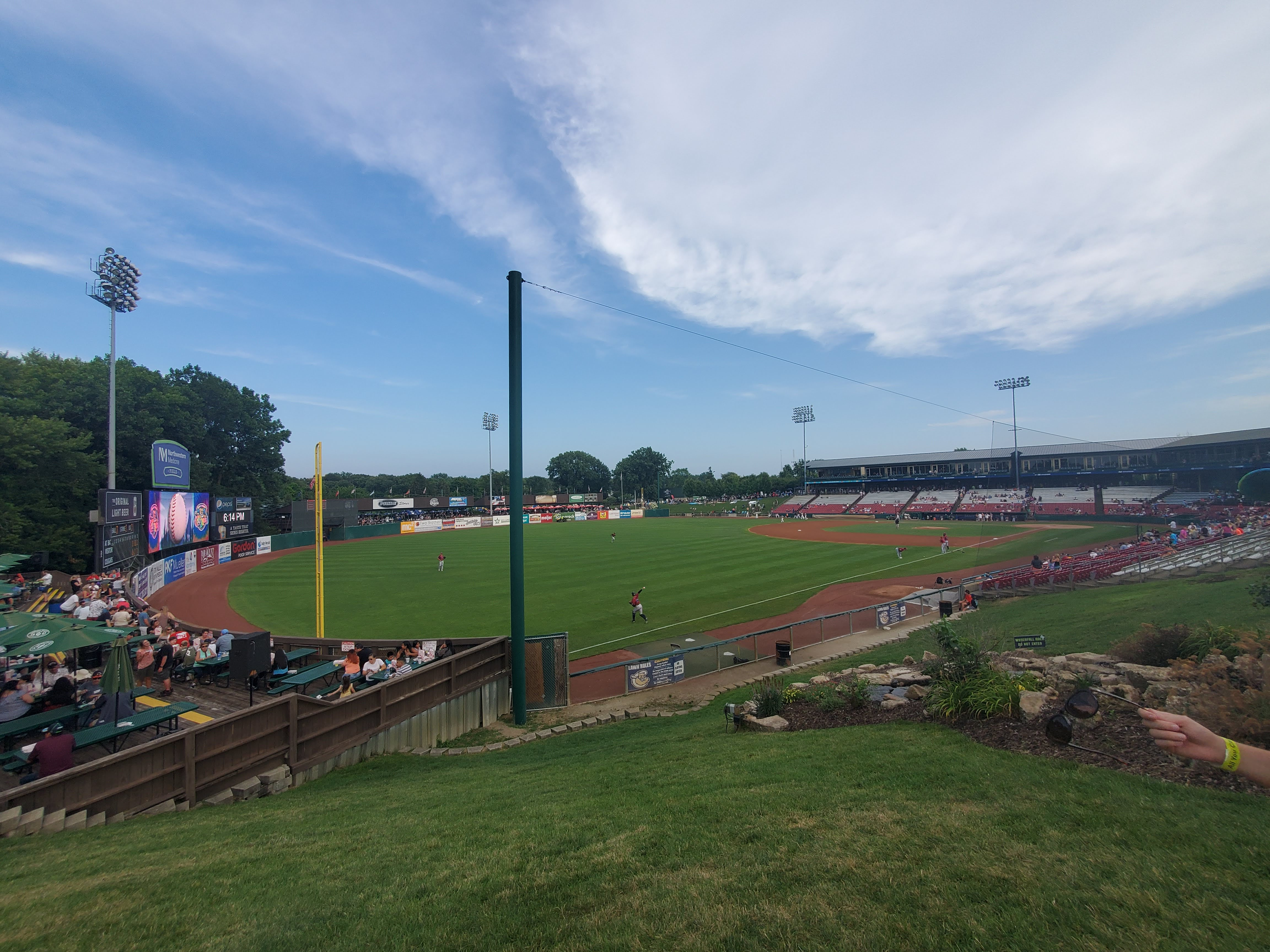
Kane County Cougars (white), playing the Kansas City Monarchs (red) at Northwestern Medicine Field on August 6, 2022

The Kane County Cougars are a professional baseball team located in Geneva, Illinois, and are members of the National Association of Professional Baseball, an official Partner League of Major League Baseball (MLB). They play their home games at Northwestern Medicine Field. From 1991 to 2020, they were members of Minor League Baseball's Midwest League.

== History ==
The Midwest League moved to Kane County in 1991 when the Wausau Timbers relocated to Geneva, IL. Relocated by Mike Woleben and Mike Murtaugh, team owners. The Wausau (1975–1990) Midwest League franchise was previously based in Decatur, Illinois (1952–1974). The team has been known as the Cougars since moving to Kane County. They were affiliated with the Baltimore Orioles in 1991 and 1992, with the Florida Marlins from 1993 to 2002, the Oakland Athletics from 2003 until 2010, the Kansas City Royals for the 2011 and 2012 seasons, and the Chicago Cubs for the 2013 and 2014 seasons before affiliating with the Arizona Diamondbacks in 2015.

As a Marlins farm team, some key contributors to the 2003 World Series championship team played in Kane County on their way to the big leagues. Miguel Cabrera has had a notable career and 2003 Series MVP Josh Beckett played for the Cougars in 2000, while Dontrelle Willis had the league's best winning percentage and earned run average in 2002.

The Cougars play their home games at Northwestern Medicine Field, built in 1991. The franchise attendance record of 523,222 was set in 2001. The Cougars are perennially among the league leaders in attendance. On July 20, 2013, the Cougars became the first Class A team to attract 10 million fans. Nancy Faust, after 40 years with the Chicago White Sox, was the stadium organist for selected Cougar home games until her retirement after the 2015 season.

In 2020, due to the COVID-19 pandemic, the Cougars' season was cancelled along with the rest of Minor League Baseball. Later that year, the team was cut from the Midwest League and affiliated baseball as part of Major League Baseball's reorganization of the minor leagues. The team considered becoming a member of the MLB Draft League before joining the American Association, an independent MLB Partner League.

The team won their first American Association Miles Wolff Cup Final in 2024, having gone undefeated in the playoffs. Following their 2024 championship, the team was invited to participate in the 2025 Baseball Champions League Americas tournament.

In March 2025, the team was sold by Dr. Bob and Cheryl Froehlich to REV Entertainment. In 2025 despite having a record under .500, the Cougars were able to defend their title going back-to-back for the first time in franchise history. By winning the 2025 season, the team was invited to the 2026 Baseball Champions League Americas, which they also won.

The team has led the American Association in attendance since joining in 2021, and led all MLB Partner Leagues in 2022.

=== American Association season-by-season record ===
Kane County Cougars
Season	League	Division	Overall	Win %	Finish	Manager	Playoffs
2021	AA	North	44–55	.444	5th	George Tsamis	Did not qualify
2022	AA	East	54–46	.540	2nd	George Tsamis	Lost East Division series (Cleburne) 1–2
2023	AA	East	49–51	.490	3rd	George Tsamis	Lost East Division series (Milwaukee) 1–2
2024	AA	East	55–45	.550	2nd	George Tsamis	Won East Division series (Lake Country) 2–0; Won East Division championship series (Chicago) 2–0; Won Wolff Cup Finals (Winnipeg) 3–0
2025	AA	East	49-51	.490	3rd	George Tsamis	Won East Division series (Milwaukee) 2–1; Won East Division championship series (Chicago) 3–2 Won Wolff Cup Finals (Sioux Falls) 3-2
Totals			251–248	.503	—	—	9–4 (.692)not including 2025

=== Playoffs ===
Kane County Cougars of the Midwest League
Season	Quarterfinals	Semifinals	Finals
1991	-	L, 2–0, Madison	-
1992	-	-	-
1993	-	-	-
1994	-	-	-
1995	L, 2–1, West Michigan	-	-
1996	-	-	-
1997	W, 2–0, Wisconsin	W, 2–0, Cedar Rapids	L, 3–2, Lansing
1998	-	-	-
1999	W, 2–1, Quad Cities	L, 2–0, Burlington	-
2000	L, 2–1, Wisconsin	-	-
2001	W, 2–0, Beloit	W, 2–0, Wisconsin	W, 1–0, South Bend
2002	-	-	-
2003	L, 2–1, Clinton	-	-
2004	W, 2–1, Peoria	W, 2–0, Clinton	L, 3–2, West Michigan
2005	-	-	-
2006	W, 2–1, Quad Cities	W, 2–0, Beloit	L, 3–1, West Michigan
2007	-	-	-
2008	L, 2–0, Burlington	-	-
2009	L, 2–0, Burlington	-	-
2010	W, 2–1, Quad Cities	L, 2–1, Clinton	-
2011	W, 2–1, Burlington	L, 2–0, Quad Cities	-
2012	L, 2–0, Fort Wayne	-	-
2013	-	-	-
2014	W, 2–0, Wisconsin	W, 2–0, Cedar Rapids	W, 3–0, Lake County
2015	L, 2–0, Peoria	-	-
2016	-	-	-
2017	L, 2–0, Cedar Rapids	-	-
2018	-	-	-
2019	L, 2–0, Clinton	-	-
Kane County Cougars of the American Association of Professional Baseball
2021	-	-	-
2022	L, 2–1 Cleburne	-	-
2023	L, 2–1 Milwaukee	-	-
2024	W, 2–0 Lake Country	W, 2–0 Chicago	W, 3–0 Winnipeg
2025	W, 2–1 Milwaukee	W, 3–2 Chicago	W, 3–2 Sioux Falls

== Mascots ==
The team's mascots are Ozzie T. Cougar and his sister Annie T. Cougar.

== Roster ==
Kane County Cougars roster
Active roster		Coaching staff
Pitchers: 33 Konnor Ash; 11 Tyler Beardsley ‡; 36 Casey Crosby; 12 Jack Fox; 25 Jake Gozzo; 24 John Kelly ‡; 15 Jordan Martinson; 10 Chris Mazza; 18 Westin Muir; 30 Logan Nissen; 16 Dom Stagliano; 13 Jake Stevenson; 47 Vin Timpanelli; 19 Zach Veen	Catchers: 6 Nick Dalesandro; 20 Oscar Santos; Infielders: 7 Josh Allen; 2 Andy Armstrong; 17 Marcus Chiu; 4 Claudio Finol; 9 Todd Lott; 3 Zane Spinn; Outfielders: 5 Trendon Craig; 14 Robby Martin; 21 Alex McGarry; 1 Blake Rutherford; 8 Armond Upshaw	Manager: 22 George Tsamis; Coaches: Scott Ellis (trainer); 33 David Holmberg (pitching); Austin Jankowiak (clubhouse manager); 24 Brett Phillips (hitting); Disabled list; ‡ Inactive list; § Suspended list; updated September 17, 2025

== Notable alumni ==
Notable franchise alumni include:

Name	Years played for Cougars	Year of MLB debut	Notable Accomplishments
Casey Crosby	2025–present	2012	
Blake Rutherford	2025–present	2023	
Robby Martin	2025–present		
Brett Phillips	2025	2017	
Chris Mazza	2025–present	2019	
Hayden Dunhurst	2024–25		
Greg Mahle	2024	2016	
Héctor Sánchez	2023	2011	2012 World Series Champion
James Reeves	2023		
T.J. Bennett	2023		
Pete Kozma	2023	2011	2011 World Series Champion
Cornelius Randolph	2022–24		10th overall pick of the 2015 MLB Draft, 2024 Miles Wolff Cup MVP
Mitch Nay	2022		
Nick Franklin	2022	2013	
Mike Morin	2022	2014	
Steve Lombardozzi Jr.	2022	2011	
Sherman Johnson	2022	2018	
Jack Anderson	2022		
Bryce Brentz	2022	2014	
Ryan Tapani	2022		
Vance Worley	2021–22	2010	
Josh Tols	2021		
Kacy Clemens	2021		
Jake Cosart	2021		
Anfernee Seymour	2021		
Blaze Alexander	2019	2024	
Levi Kelly	2019		
Luis Frías	2019	2021	
Kristian Robinson	2019		
Dominic Fletcher	2019	2023	
Buddy Kennedy	2019	2022	
José Cuas	2019	2022	
Alek Thomas	2019	2022	2019 Midwest League MVP
Geraldo Perdomo	2019	2021	
José Caballero	2018	2023	
Jhoan Durán	2018	2022	
Matt Peacock	2018	2021	
José Herrera	2017–19	2022	
Jazz Chisholm Jr.	2017–18	2020	
Carlos Bustamante	2017–18		
Tommy Eveld	2017		
J. J. Hoover	2017	2012	
Connor Grey	2017		pitched perfect game against Clinton LumberKings Sep. 1
Ben DeLuzio	2017	2022	
Anfernee Grier	2017		
Riley Smith	2017	2020	
Colin Poche	2017	2019	
Kevin Ginkel	2017	2019	
Jon Duplantier	2017	2019	
Luis Alejandro Basabe	2016–18		
Marcus Wilson	2016–17	2022	
Sam McWilliams	2016–17		
Junior García	2016–17		
Gabe Speier	2016	2019	
Yuhei Nakaushiro	2016		
Taylor Clarke	2016	2019	
Joel Payamps	2016	2019	
Alex Young	2016	2019	
Gabriel Moya	2016	2017	
Touki Toussaint	2015	2018	
Wei-Chieh Huang	2015; 2017	2019	
Sergio Alcántara	2015–16	2020	
Ryan Burr	2015–16	2018	
Steve Hathaway	2015	2016	
Oscar Hernández	2015	2015	Called-up to the Diamondbacks less than one month after being promoted to the Cougars
Dawel Lugo	2015	2018	
Josh Taylor	2015	2019	
Ildemaro Vargas	2015	2017	
Michael Pérez	2015	2018	
Zac Curtis	2015	2016	Set team record for most saves in a season (2015) at 33
Víctor Reyes	2015	2018	
Brad Keller	2015	2018	
Steven Hathaway	2015	2016	
Kyuji Fujikawa	2014	2013	
Ryan Sweeney	2014	2006	
Jasvir Rakkar	2014		
Duane Underwood Jr.	2014	2018	
Jen-Ho Tseng	2014	2017	
Jacob Hannemann	2014	2017	
Paul Blackburn	2014	2017	
Víctor Caratini	2014	2017	
Mark Zagunis	2014	2017	
Zack Godley	2014	2015	
Kyle Schwarber	2014	2015	MLB All-Star, 2016 World Series Champion
Gerardo Concepción	2014	2016	
David Bote	2013–14	2018	
Pierce Johnson	2013–14	2017	
Jeimer Candelario	2013–14	2016	
Luis Valbuena	2013	2008	
Trevor Gretzky	2013		
Shawn Camp	2013	2004	
Rafael Dolis	2013	2011	
Lendy Castillo	2013	2012	
Armando Rivero	2013		
Tayler Scott	2013	2019	
Dillon Maples	2013	2017	
Daniel Vogelbach	2013	2016	MLB All-Star
Rob Zastryzny	2013	2016	
Félix Peña	2013	2016	
Willson Contreras	2013	2016	2× MLB All-Star, 2016 World Series Champion
Albert Almora	2013	2016	2016 World Series Champion
Marco Hernández	2013	2016	
Andrew McKirahan	2013	2015	
Scott Baker	2013	2005	
Jack López	2012	2021	
Kyle Zimmer	2012	2019	
Brooks Pounders	2012	2016	2014 No-Hitter
Jorge Bonifacio	2012	2017	
Andrew Triggs	2012	2016	
Tim Melville	2012	2016	
Scott Alexander	2012	2015	
Aaron Brooks	2012	2014	
Lane Adams	2011–12	2014	
Orlando Calixte	2011–12	2015	
Fernando Cruz	2011	2022	
Ryan Jenkins	2011		
Jason Adam	2011	2018	
Juan Graterol	2011	2016	
Yordano Ventura	2011	2013	2015 World Series Champion
Brett Eibner	2011	2016	
Cheslor Cuthbert	2011	2015	
Sugar Ray Marimon	2011	2015	
Justin Marks	2010	2014	
Bo Schultz	2010	2014	
Michael Choice	2010	2013	
Max Stassi	2010	2013	
Ian Krol	2010	2013	
Daniel Straily	2010	2012	
Murphy Smith	2009–2010	2018	
Shawn Haviland	2009		
Pedro Figueroa	2009	2012	
Grant Desme	2009		
Dusty Coleman	2009	2015	
Tyler Ladendorf	2009	2015	
Mickey Storey	2009	2012	
Pedro Figuero	2009	2012	
Scott Mitchinson	2008		
Tyson Ross	2008	2010	MLB All-Star
Corey Brown	2008	2011	
Jemile Weeks	2008	2011	
Travis Banwart	2007		
Trevor Cahill	2007	2009	MLB All-Star, 2016 World Series Champion
Sean Doolittle	2007	2012	2× MLB All-Star, 2019 World Series Champion
Andrew Bailey	2007	2009	2× MLB All-Star, 2009 AL Rookie of the Year
Andrew Carignan	2007	2011	
Sam Demel	2007	2010	
Henry Rodríguez	2007	2009	
Joey Newby	2006–07		
Vin Mazzaro	2006	2009	
Ben Jukich	2006		
Jeff Gray	2006	2008	
Anthony Recker	2006	2011	
Justin Sellers	2006	2011	
Brad Kilby	2006	2009	
Jeff Baisley	2006	2008	2006 Midwest League MVP, holds team record of 110 RBI in a season (2006)
Cliff Pennington	2005	2008	
Ryan Webb	2005	2009	
Tommy Everidge	2005	2009	
Gregorio Petit	2005	2008	
Kevin Melillo	2005	2007	
Connor Robertson	2005	2007	
Travis Buck	2005	2007	
Chris Lubanski	2004		
Dallas Braden	2004	2007	Perfect game in 2010
Huston Street	2004	2005	2× MLB All-Star, 2005 AL Rookie of the Year
Danny Putnam	2004	2007	
Jason Windsor	2004	2006	
Marcus McBeth	2003; 2005	2007	
Santiago Casilla	2003–04	2004	
Dustin Majewski	2003		
John Baker	2003	2008	
Joe Blanton	2003	2004	2008 World Series Champion
Nelson Cruz	2003	2005	7× MLB All-Star, 2019 All-MLB First Team, 2020 All-MLB Second Team, 2011 ALCS MVP, 2× Silver Slugger, 2× Edgar Martínez Award, 2014 MLB Home Run Leader, 2017 AL RBI Leader, 2020 Marvin Miller Man of the Year Award, 2013 All-World Baseball Classic Team
Andre Ethier	2003	2006	2× MLB All-Star, 2011 Gold Glove, 2009 Silver Slugger
Bill Murphy	2003	2007	
Jared Burton	2003	2007	
Shane Komine	2003	2006	
Frailyn Florián	2002		
Dontrelle Willis	2002	2003	2× MLB All-Star, 2003 World Series Champion, 2003 NL Rookie of the Year, 2005 NL Wins Leader
Jason Stokes	2002		2002 Midwest League MVP, tied for team record with 27 home runs in a season (2002), team record of .341 batting average in a season (2002)
Ronald Belisario	2002	2009	
Jeff Fulchino	2002	2006	
Eric Reed	2002	2006	
Jim Kavourias	2001		
Miguel Cabrera	2001	2003	11× MLB All-Star, 2003 World Series Champion, 2× AL MVP, 2012 Triple Crown, 7× Silver Slugger, 2× AL Hank Aaron Award, 4× AL Batting Champion, 2× AL Home Run Leader, 2× AL RBI Leader
Adrián González	2001	2004	2001 Midwest League MVP, 5× MLB All-Star, 4× Gold Glove, 2× Silver Slugger, 2014 NL RBI Leader
Josh Willingham	2001	2004	2012 Silver Slugger
Randy Messenger	2001	2005	
Denny Bautista	2001	2004	
Hansel Izquierdo	2001	2002	
Vladimir Núñez	2001	1998	
Chip Ambres	2000–01	2005	
Kevin Hooper	2000–01	2005	
Josh Wilson	2000–01	2005	
Josh Beckett	2000	2001	3× MLB All-Star, 2× World Series Champion (2003 & 2007), 2003 World Series MVP, 2007 ALCS MVP, 2007 MLB Wins Leader
Luis Ugueto	2000	2002	
Matt Treanor	1999; 2001	2004	
Nate Robertson	1999–2000	2002	
Claudio Vargas	1999	2003	
Jeff Bailey	1999	2007	
Chris Aguila	1999	2004	
Kevin Olsen	1999	2001	
Blaine Neal	1999	2001	
Brett Roneberg	1998–99		
A. J. Burnett	1998	1999	MLB All-Star, 2009 World Series Champion, 2008 AL Strikeout Leader, 2001 No-Hitter, holds team record for most strikeouts in a season (1998) at 186
Brandon Harper	1998	2006	
Matt Erickson	1998	2004	
Jason Pearson	1998	2002	
Ross Gload	1998	2000	
Michael Tejera	1998	1999	
Gary Knotts	1997–98	2001	
Héctor Almonte	1997–98	1999	
Geoff Duncan	1997		
Scott Podsednik	1997	2001	MLB All-Star, 2005 World Series Champion, 2004 NL Stolen Base Leader
Julio Ramírez	1997	1999	
Brent Billingsley	1997	1999	
Earl Agnoly	1996–97		
Roosevelt Brown	1996–97	1999	
Ryan Dempster	1996	1998	2× MLB All-Star, 2013 World Series Champion
Álex González	1996	1998	MLB All-Star, 2003 World Series Champion
Mark Kotsay	1996	1997	
Randy Winn	1996	1998	MLB All-Star
Nate Rolison	1996	2000	
Mike Duvall	1996	1998	
Josh Booty	1995–96	1996	
Amaury García	1995–96	1999	
Luis Castillo	1995	1996	3× MLB All-Star, 2003 World Series Champion, 3× Gold Glove, 2× NL Stolen Base Leader
Ryan Jackson	1995	1998	
Brian Meadows	1995	1998	
John Roskos	1995	1998	
Gabe González	1995	1998	
Todd Dunwoody	1994–95	1997	
Brendan Kingman	1994		
Antonio Alfonseca	1994	1997	1997 World Series Champion, 2000 NL Rolaids Relief Man Award, 2000 NL Saves Leader
Félix Heredia	1994	1996	1997 World Series Champion
Kevin Millar	1994	1998	2004 World Series Champion
Bryan Ward	1994	1998	
David Berg	1994	1998	
Will Cunnane	1994	1997	Holds team record of lowest ERA in a season (1994) at 1.43
Andy Larkin	1994	1996	
Billy McMillon	1994	1996	
Ralph Milliard	1994	1996	
Marc Valdes	1994	1995	
Mike Redmond	1993–94	1998	2003 World Series Champion
John Lynch	1993		
Héctor Carrasco	1993	1994	
Charles Johnson	1993	1994	2× MLB All-Star, 1997 World Series Champion, 4× Gold Glove
Édgar Rentería	1993	1996	5× MLB All-Star, 2× World Series Champion, 2010 World Series MVP, 2× Gold Glove, 3× Silver Slugger
Chris Clapinski	1993	1999	
Vic Darensbourg	1993	1998	
Matt Whisenant	1993	1997	
Anthony Saunders	1993	1997	
Alex Ochoa	1992	1995	2002 World Series Champion
B. J. Waszgis	1992	2000	
Jimmy Haynes	1992	1995	
Rick Krivda	1992	1995	
Curtis Goodwin	1992	1995	
Scott Klingenbeck	1992	1994	
José Mercedes	1992	1994	
Scott McClain	1991–92	1998	
Bobby Chouinard	1991–92	1996	
Clayton Byrne	1991		
Joe Borowski	1991	1995	2007 AL Saves Leader
Tom Martin	1991	1997	
Brad Pennington	1991	1993	First Kane County Cougars player to be called-up to the MLB
Gregg Zaun	1991	1995	1997 World Series Champion
Jim Dedrick	1991	1995	
Vaughn Eshelman	1991	1995	

Also see Category: Kane County Cougars players.
