= Cornelius Randolph =

American baseball player (born 1997)

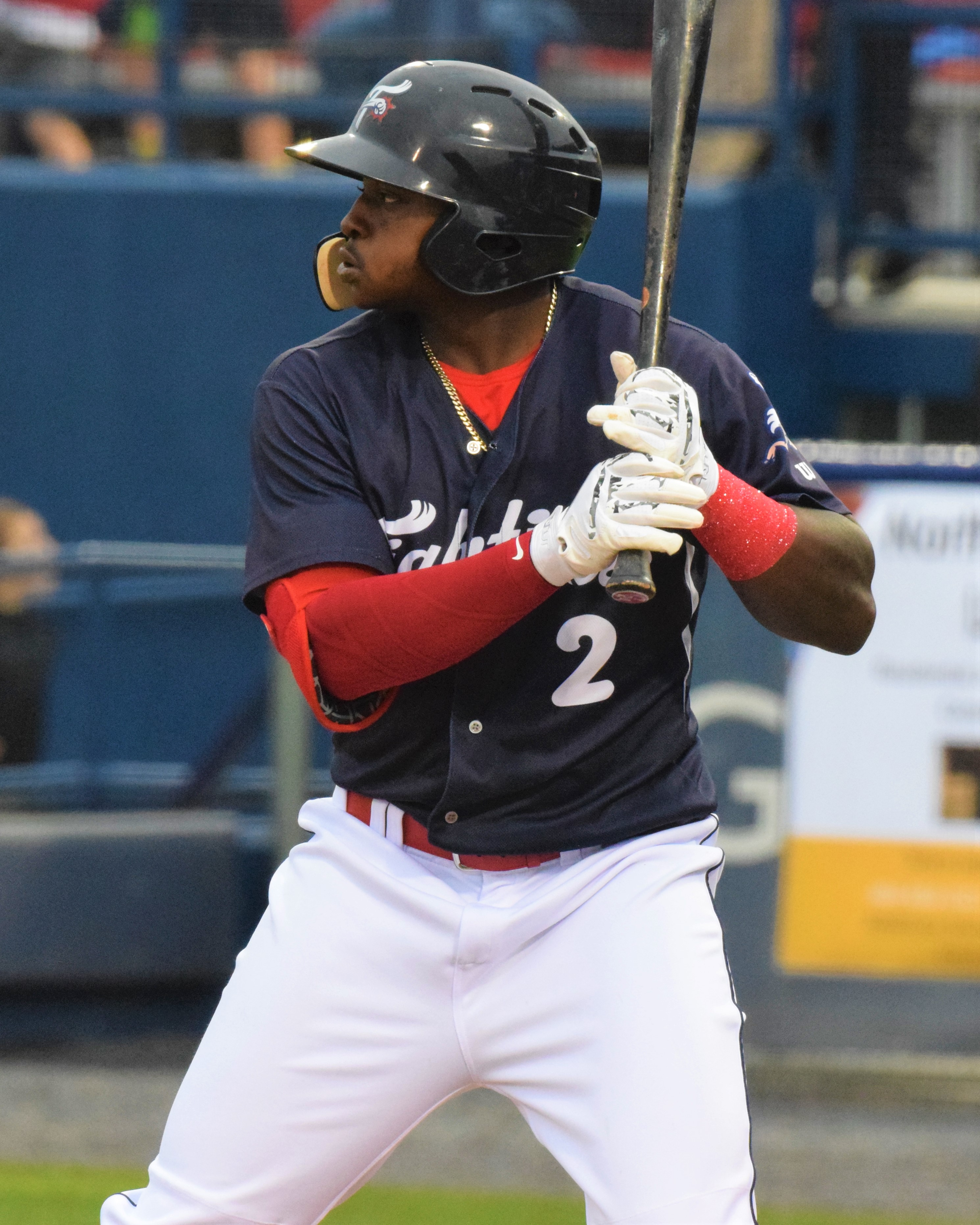
- Randolph with the Reading Fightin Phils in 2018

Charleston Dirty Birds – No. 12
- Outfielder
- Born: June 2, 1997 (age 29); Brunswick, Georgia, U.S.
- Bats: Left Throws: Right

Cornelius Cleopatrick Randolph (born June 2, 1997) is an American professional baseball outfielder for the Charleston Dirty Birds of the Atlantic League of Professional Baseball. He was drafted by the Philadelphia Phillies with the 10th overall pick of the 2015 MLB draft.

== Career ==
Randolph attended Griffin High School in Griffin, Georgia. During Randolph's senior year, he hit .533 with eight home runs and a 1.631 OPS. He committed to play college baseball for the Clemson Tigers, but after the Philadelphia Phillies selected him with the 10th pick in the first round of the 2015 Major League Baseball draft, he signed with the Phillies, receiving a $3,231,300 signing bonus.

=== Philadelphia Phillies ===
Randolph made his professional debut with the rookie-level Gulf Coast League Phillies, batting .302 with one home run and 24 RBI over 53 games. In 2016, he played with the Lakewood BlueClaws where he hit .274 with two home runs and 27 RBI over 63 games. Randolph spent 2017 with the Clearwater Threshers, slashing .250/.338/.402 with 13 home runs and 55 RBI over 122 games, and after the season, played in the Arizona Fall League for the Glendale Desert Dogs. He spent 2018 with the Reading Fightin Phils, batting .241 with five home runs and forty RBI over 118 games.

In 2019, Randolph returned to play for Reading, hitting .247 with ten home runs and 44 RBI over 102 appearances. Randolph did not play in a game in 2020 due to the cancellation of the minor league season because of the COVID-19 pandemic. In 2021, Randolph spent the majority of the season with the Triple-A Lehigh Valley IronPigs, also appearing in five games for the rookie-level Florida Complex League Phillies, slashing .235/.323/.386 in with five home runs and 20 RBI in 48 games. He elected free agency following the season on November 7, 2021.

=== Chicago White Sox ===
On March 8, 2022, Randolph signed a minor league contract with the Chicago White Sox. Randolph was assigned to the Double-A Birmingham Barons to begin the season. After struggling to a .118/.211/.117 with no home runs and 1 RBI in 11 games for Birmingham, he was released by the White Sox organization on May 3.

=== Kane County Cougars ===
On May 10, 2022, Randolph signed with the Kane County Cougars of the American Association of Professional Baseball. He played in 87 games for the Cougars, slashing .310/.394/.517 with 14 home runs, 64 RBI, and 13 stolen bases. He was released by the team on November 8.

On May 1, 2023, Randolph re-signed with the Cougars. In 63 games for the club, he hit .279/.372/.430 with five home runs and 36 RBI. Randolph became a free agent at the end of the season.

On January 20, 2024, Randolph signed with the Dorados de Chihuahua of the Mexican League. However, he was released prior to the start of the season on April 10.

On May 2, 2024, Randolph re–signed with the Kane County Cougars of the American Association of Professional Baseball. Randolph slashed .343/.447/.527 with 11 home runs and 58 RBI in 79 games, helping the Cougars win their third Championship in their franchise history. This was also Kane County's first Miles Wolff Cup Championship since joining the American Association in 2021, sweeping the Winnipeg Goldeyes. Randolph won the Series MVP after he went 6–for–12 with two RBI including a walk off hit in game 1 of the series.

=== Tigres de Quintana Roo ===
On November 8, 2024, Randolph signed with the Tigres de Quintana Roo of the Mexican League. Randolph made 72 appearances for Quintana Roo during the 2025 season, batting .267/.375/.394 with four home runs, 21 RBI, and 16 stolen bases. On April 11, 2026, Randolph was released by the Tigres.

=== Charleston Dirty Birds ===
On April 18, 2026, Randolph signed with the Charleston Dirty Birds of the Atlantic League of Professional Baseball.
