= Joey Marciano =

American baseball player (born 1995)

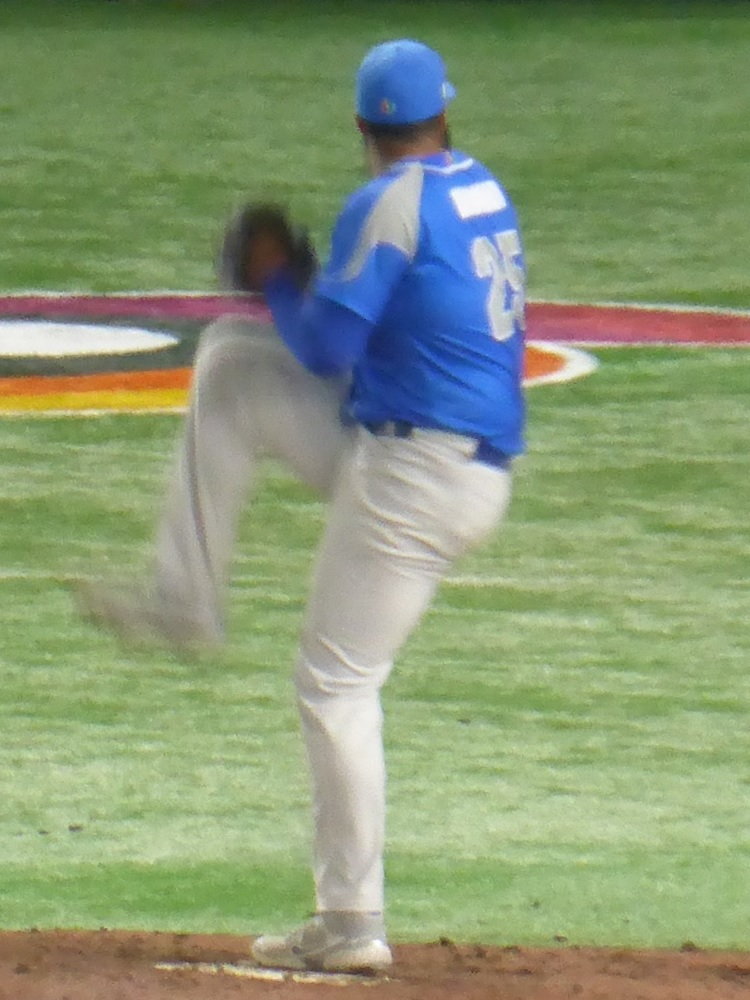
- Pitcher
- Born: January 11, 1995 (age 31); Chicago, Illinois, U.S.
- Bats: Left Throws: Left

Joey James Marciano (born January 11, 1995) is an American former professional baseball pitcher. He played for the Italian national team in the 2023 World Baseball Classic.

== Career ==
=== Amateur ===
Marciano grew up in Chicago. He attended Roberto Clemente Community Academy and began playing baseball in his freshman year. He also participated in Reviving Baseball in Inner Cities. Marciano received a scholarship to play college baseball at John A. Logan College. As a freshman, Marciano was named the Great Rivers Athletic Conference's freshman of the year. In his sophomore year, he had a 7–4 win–loss record and a 2.52 earned run average in 11 games started, with six complete games and two shutouts, and he was named the conference's pitcher of the year. After two years at Logan, he transferred to Southern Illinois University Carbondale to continue his college baseball career with the Southern Illinois Salukis.

=== San Francisco Giants ===
The San Francisco Giants drafted Marciano in the 36th round, with the 1,086th overall selection, of the 2017 Major League Baseball draft. In 2018, Marciano played for the Augusta GreenJackets, and was named to the South Atlantic League All-Star Game. He struggled with the San Jose Giants in 2019, allowing 40 hits in 41 2/3 innings pitched, and retired from baseball in July. Back in Chicago, he trained with D. J. Snelten, who helped him to add 4–5 miles per hour (6.4–8.0 km/h) on his fastball. Marciano chose to return to baseball in 2020, but the minor league season was canceled due to the COVID-19 pandemic.

He pitched for the Double–A Richmond Flying Squirrels in 2021. In 39 contests, he registered a 3.09 ERA with 59 strikeouts in 46 2/3 innings pitched. Marciano spent the 2022 season with the Triple–A Sacramento River Cats. Across 56 appearances, he logged a 4.12 ERA with 62 strikeouts and 9 saves in 59.0 innings of work.

In 2023, he made 31 appearances for the River Cats, but struggled to a 4–5 record and 6.75 ERA with 51 strikeouts and 3 saves in 42 2/3 innings pitched. On July 26, 2023, Marciano was released by the Giants organization.

=== Dorados de Chihuahua ===
On January 10, 2024, Marciano signed with the Diablos Rojos del México of the Mexican League. However, he was released by the team prior to the LMB season on March 25.

On April 10, 2024, Marciano signed with the Dorados de Chihuahua of the Mexican League. In three appearances for Chihuahua, he struggled to a 13.50 ERA with 2 strikeouts across 1 1/3 innings. Marciano was released by the Dorados on April 26.

=== Chicago Dogs ===
On May 12, 2024, Marciano signed with the Chicago Dogs of the American Association of Professional Baseball. He made 41 appearances for the Dogs, compiling a 5-3 record and 1.78 ERA with 74 strikeouts and 26 saves across 55 2/3 innings pitched.

== International career ==
In 2023, Marciano played for the Italian national team in the 2023 World Baseball Classic.

== Personal life ==
Marciano has three younger sisters and a younger brother.

Rocky Marciano is a cousin twice removed on his father's side of the family.
