= Chris Muller (baseball) =

American baseball player (born 1996)

Free agent
- Pitcher
- Born: April 22, 1996 (age 30); Dallas, Texas, U.S.
- Bats: Right Throws: Right

Christopher Robert Muller (born April 22, 1996) is an American professional baseball pitcher who is a free agent. He is currently a phantom ballplayer, having spent three days on the Tampa Bay Rays' active roster without appearing in a big-league game.

== Amateur career ==
During his early years Muller was a standout pitcher for the Which Wich Grinders and attended Jesuit College Preparatory School in Dallas, Texas. He attended Paris Junior College, where he began his college baseball career, and transferred to the University of Texas at San Antonio (UTSA) to play for the UTSA Roadrunners.

== Professional career ==
=== Tampa Bay Rays ===
Muller was selected by the Tampa Bay Rays in the 17th round, with the 499th overall selection, of the 2017 Major League Baseball draft. He signed with the Rays on June 19, 2017. He made his professional debut in 2018, splitting time between the rookie-level Gulf Coast Rays and Low-A Hudson Valley Renegades. In 14 games, he posted a 2.28 ERA with 20 strikeouts in 23.2 innings pitched. In 2019, he pitched in 31 games for the Single-A Bowling Green Hot Rods, logging a 2–5 record and 2.88 ERA with 87 strikeouts and 4 saves in 56.1 innings pitched.

Miller did not play in a minor league game in 2020 due to the cancellation of the season as a result of the COVID-19 pandemic. He instead played for the Sugar Land Lightning Sloths of the Constellation Energy League, where he logged a 5.63 ERA with 9 strikeouts and 2 saves in 7 appearances. He spent the 2021 season split between Bowling Green and the Double-A Montgomery Biscuits. In 21 combined appearances, he registered a 4.98 ERA with 32 strikeouts and 7 saves in 21.2 innings pitched.

He spent the 2022 season with the Triple-A Durham Bulls, making 51 appearances and registering a 5–3 record and 4.91 ERA with 75 strikeouts and 2 saves in 58.2 innings pitched. Muller was assigned to Triple-A Durham to begin the 2023 season, where he made 14 appearances and posted a 3.71 ERA with 19 strikeouts and 1 save in 17.0 innings pitched.

Following an injury to Drew Rasmussen, on May 12, 2023, Muller was selected to the 40-man roster and promoted to the major leagues for the first time. Muller did not make an appearance for the Rays and was optioned to Triple-A on May 15 when Pete Fairbanks was activated off of the injured list, making him a phantom ballplayer. On May 28, Muller was designated for assignment following the promotion of Joe LaSorsa. He cleared waivers and was released by the Rays on May 29. He re-signed with the team on a minor league contract on June 15. After 6 scoreless appearances for the rookie–level Florida Complex League Rays, Muller was released for a second time on August 3.

=== Chicago White Sox ===
On August 6, 2023, Muller signed a minor league contract with the Chicago White Sox organization. He made 9 appearances for the Triple–A Charlotte Knights, struggling to an 11.88 ERA with 7 strikeouts across 8 1/3 innings pitched. Muller elected free agency following the season on November 6.

=== Cleburne Railroaders ===
On March 22, 2024, Muller signed with the Cleburne Railroaders of the American Association of Professional Baseball. In 33 appearances for Cleburne, he recorded a 3.43 ERA with 51 strikeouts and 4 saves across 42 innings of work.

=== Rieleros de Aguascalientes ===
On April 17, 2025, Muller signed with the Rieleros de Aguascalientes of the Mexican League. In nine appearances for Aguascalientes, he struggled to a 1-1 record and 11.88 ERA with six strikeouts across 8 1/3 innings pitched. Muller was released by the Rieleros on May 3.

=== Acereros de Monclova ===
On May 4, 2025, Muller signed with the Acereros de Monclova of the Mexican League. In 32 games 34 innings of relief he went 0-3 with a 4.24 ERA with 19 walks and 26 strikeouts. He was released on January 23, 2026.

== Personal life ==
His younger brother, Kyle, was also a Major League Baseball pitcher who last pitched for the Oakland Athletics.
