= Northwestern Medicine Field =

Baseball field in Geneva, Illinois, US

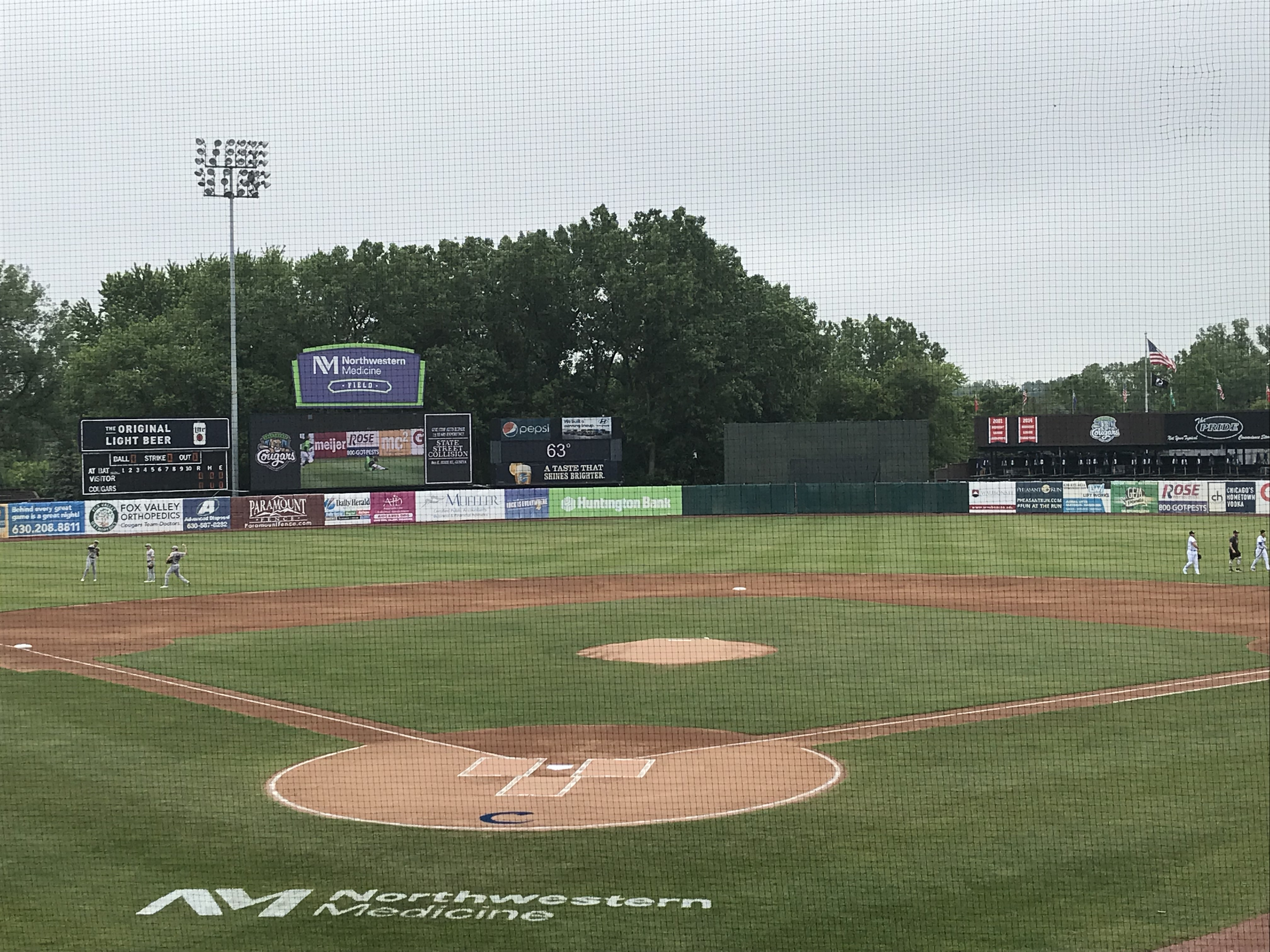
- Interactive map of Northwestern Medicine Field
- Former names: Kane County Events Park (1991–1993); Philip B. Elfstrom Stadium (1993–2011); Fifth Third Bank Ballpark (2012–2016)
- Location: 34W002 Cherry Lane; Geneva, Illinois 60134
- Coordinates: 41°52′50.34″N 88°16′54.32″W
- Owner: Kane County Forest Preserve
- Operator: Kane County Cougars Baseball Club
- Capacity: 3,600 (1991); 4,800 (1992–1996); 5,600 (1997–1999); 7,400 (2000–2014); 10,923 (2015–present)
- Surface: Grass
- Field size: Left Field: 335 feet Center Field: 400 feet Right Field: 335 feet

Construction
- Groundbreaking: May 1990
- Opened: April 13, 1991
- Cost: $5 million ($11.8 million in 2025 dollars) $14.5 million (renovation)
- Architect: Populous
- Structural engineer: Harper & Kerr, P.A.
- Services engineers: Bredson & Associates, Inc.
- General contractor: Markur Contractors Inc.

Tenant
- Kane County Cougars (NAPB) (1991–present)

Northwestern Medicine Field (originally Kane County Events Park and formerly Philip B. Elfstrom Stadium and Fifth Third Bank Ballpark) is a baseball field located in Geneva, Illinois. The stadium was built in 1991 and holds 10,923 people. It is the home ballpark of the Kane County Cougars. The stadium has the highest capacity for any independent league baseball stadium.

== History ==
Elfstrom Stadium

Northwestern Medicine Field was originally named after Philip B. Elfstrom, the former Kane County Forest Preserve President, and the person most responsible for bringing minor league baseball to Kane County.

The stadium serves as the home of the Kane County Cougars baseball team of the American Association of Professional Baseball, previously members of the Midwest League. The stadium was constructed in 1991, and in 2001 the Cougars set a league attendance record of 523,222. On May 3, 2012, or "5/3 day", the stadium was officially renamed Fifth Third Bank Ballpark.

On June 18, 2012, it was the home for the 2012 Midwest League All-Star Game. It was the fourth All-Star held in the stadium; the first was in 2000.

The ballpark was renamed Northwestern Medicine Field on November 15, 2016, in a five-year naming rights deal with Northwestern Medicine.

== Renovations ==
In 2008, the stadium underwent a $10.5 million renovation project that added a second level seating area, covered concourse, and skybox suites among other amenities. It finished in time for the start of the 2009 baseball season.

In 2014, the Cougars announced that additional capital improvements would be made in time for the 2015 baseball season, including a climate-controlled cage that will also have a weight room and a video-room, allowing access for Cougars and field staff to develop and evaluate players. Also under construction is a high-definition videoboard, which will show promotions, highlights, and instant replays, as well as construction of a premium seating area on the lower-seating bowl area of the ballpark. A pavilion will also be erected to be used predominantly for music during game-day, as well as events such as the Cougars' Ballpark Concert Series and non-game-day events, as well. These forthcoming renovations are said to further "modernize" Fifth Third Bank Ballpark and to commemorate the 25th anniversary of the stadium as well.
