= 2004 Claxton Shield =

2004 Claxton Shield teams

Results and statistics for the 2004 Claxton Shield

== Ladder ==
Team	Played	Wins	Loss	Win %	Runs For	Runs Against	Percentage
Queensland Rams	5	4	1	.800	48	30	.615
NSW Patriots	5	3	2	.600	35	18	.660
South Australia	5	3	2	.600	37	32	.536
Western Heelers	5	3	2	.600	19	26	.422
Aust Provincials	5	1	4	.200	23	37	.383
Victoria Aces	5	1	4	.200	20	39	.339

== Championship series ==
=== 23 January 2004 – Semi Final 1 – Western Australia Vs Queensland Rams ===
Team	1	2	3	4	5	6	7	8	9	R	H	E
Western Australia	0	3	0	1	0	0	1	0	0	5	12	3
Queensland Rams	0	0	2	1	3	4	0	3	X	13	17	2
Starting pitchers: WA: M Hodge; Rams: P Mutch; WP: P Mutch (1-0) LP: B Thomas (1-1); Home runs: WA: 1; L Hughes, L Dale; Rams: 2; D Nilsson Attendance:

=== 24 January 2004 – Semi Final 2 – South Australia Vs New South Wales Patriots ===
Team	1	2	3	4	5	6	7	8	9	R	H	E
South Australia	1	0	0	3	0	0	1	0	0	5	10	2
NSW Patriots	3	0	3	0	0	2	0	0	X	8	10	0
Starting pitchers: SA: J Challino; Patriots: B Thomas; WP: R Thompson LP: J Challinor Sv: C Lewis; Home runs: SA: 0 Patriots: 1; R Van Buizen Attendance:

=== 24 January 2004 – Grand Final – New South Wales Patriots Vs Queensland Rams ===
Team	1	2	3	4	5	6	7	8	9	R	H	E
NSW Patriots	1	0	0	2	1	3	0	0	0	7	12	1
Queensland Rams	0	0	0	0	0	0	0	4	0	4	4	3
Starting pitchers: Patriots: R Rowland-Smith; Aces: M Gahan; WP: C Oxspring LP: M Gahan; Home runs: Patriots: 1; T Oeltjen; Aces: 1; D Nilsson Attendance:

*Box Score

== Award winners ==
Award	Person	Team
Most Valuable Player	Breet Roneberg	Queensland Rams
Championship M.V.P.	Trent Oeltjen	New South Wales Patriots
Golden Glove	Chris Oxspring	New South Wales Patriots
Batting Champion	Ben Wigmore	South Australia
Pitcher of the Year	Luke Hughes	Western Australia

== Top Stats ==
Defensive Stats
Name	Wins	Losses	Saves	ERA
Chris Oxspring	1	0	0	4.50
John Veitch	1	0	0	2.08
Darren Fudge	1	0	0	1.29
Ryan Row-Smith	1	0	0	0.00
Max Brendon	1	0	0	1.50
Richard Thompson	1	0	0	1.50

Offensive Stars
Name	Avg	HR	RBI
Ben Wigmore	.500	0	7
Brett Roneberg	.474	0	7
Sam Tibbita	.444	1	11
Gavin Fingleson	.414	0	7
Nick Kimpton	.400	0	4
David Nilsson (11 AB)	.455	4	12

== All-Star Team ==
Position	Name	Team
Catcher	Ben Wigmore	South Australia
1st Base	Glynn Kimberley	Victoria Aces
2nd Base	Gavin Fingleson	New South Wales Patriots
3rd Base	Paul Gonzalez	Queensland Rams
Short Stop	Glenn Williams	New South Wales Patriots
Out Field	Brett Roneberg	Queensland Rams
Out Field	Jarrod Hodges	Victoria Aces
Out Field	Nick Kimpton	Australia Provincial
Designated Hitter	David Nilsson	Queensland Rams
Starting Pitcher	John Veitch	Queensland Rams
Relief Pitcher	Tom Becker	South Australia
Manager	Shane Barclay	New South Wales Patriots
