= 2002 International Baseball League of Australia season =

2001-02 International Baseball League teams

The 2001-02 International Baseball League of Australia was played exclusively at the Melbourne Ballpark. The championship reverted to its 1999-2000 format using 6 state teams, however New South Wales Country was replaced by an Australian Provincial Team with a mix of players from the Australian Capital Territory and the Northern Territory.

== Match results ==
=== Game 1: Feb 02, 2002 ===
Team	1	2	3	4	5	6	7	8	9	R	H	E
NSW Patriots	0	0	0	1	0	0	0	0	0	1	8	2
Victoria Aces	0	0	1	0	0	0	2	2	X	5	10	1
WP: Matthew WILKINSON (1-0) LP: Phillip ARDILL (0-1) Sv: - Home runs: Patriots: 0 Aces: 0 Attendance: 359

=== Game 2: Feb 03, 2002 ===
Team	1	2	3	4	5	6	7	8	9	R	H	E
Australia Provincial	0	0	2	0	1	0	1	0	0	4	14	1
South Australia	0	0	0	1	0	2	0	1	1	5	11	2
WP: Simon BORLACE (1-0) LP: Steven CAMM (0-1) Sv: - Home runs: Provincial: 0 SA: 0 Attendance: -

=== Game 3: Feb 03, 2002 ===
Team	1	2	3	4	5	6	7	8	9	R	H	E
New South Wales Patriots	2	0	0	0	1	3	0	2	0	8	12	4
Queensland Rams	0	0	1	2	0	0	0	0	0	8	7	4
WP: Josh HILL (1-0) LP: Phil STOCKMAN (0-1) Sv: - Home runs: Patriots: 0 Rams: 0 Attendance: 128

=== Game 4: Feb 03, 2002 ===
Team	1	2	3	4	5	6	7	8	9	R	H	E
Western Heelers	0	0	0	0	2	0	1	0	1	4	9	5
Victoria Aces	1	1	3	0	0	0	0	0	X	5	8	3
WP: David McWATTERS (1-0) LP: Duane ROCHFORD (0-1) Sv: - Home runs: Heelers: 0 Aces: 0 Attendance: -

=== Game 5: Feb 04, 2002 ===
Team	1	2	3	4	5	6	7	8	9	R	H	E
South Australia	1	0	0	0	1	1	0	0	3	6	8	1
New South Wales Patriots	1	0	0	0	0	1	0	0	3	5	7	3
WP: Darren FIDGE (1-0) LP: David BOYTON (0-1) Sv: - Home runs: SA: 0 Patriots: 0 Attendance: 34

=== Game 6: Feb 04, 2002 ===
Team	1	2	3	4	5	6	7	8	9	R	H	E
Western Heelers	0	0	0	3	0	2	0	0	0	5	8	1
Australian Provincial	0	0	1	2	1	0	0	0	0	4	14	0
WP: Simon EISSENS (1-0) LP: Brett RAMSEY (0-1) Sv: Shane TONKIN; Home runs: Heelers: 0 Provincial: 0 Attendance: -

=== Game 7: Feb 04, 2002 ===
Team	1	2	3	4	5	6	7	8	9	R	H	E
Victoria Aces	2	0	0	3	0	0	0	0	2	7	14	1
Queensland Rams	0	1	0	0	0	2	0	0	2	5	10	1
WP: Greg WILTSHIRE (1-0) LP: Blake KEARNEY (0-1) Sv: - Home runs: Aces: 0 Rams: 0 Attendance: -

=== Game 8: Feb 05, 2002 ===
Team	1	2	3	4	5	6	7	8	9	R	H	E
Queensland Rams	0	1	1	0	0	3	2	0	0	7	10	1
Australia Provincial	0	0	1	1	0	0	3	1	0	6	10	4
WP: John VEITCH (1-0) LP: Adam BERWICK (0-1) Sv: - Home runs: Rams: 0 Provincial: 0 Attendance: 38

=== Game 9: Feb 05, 2002 ===
Team	1	2	3	4	5	6	7	8	9	R	H	E
South Australia	0	0	1	2	0	1	0	0	0	4	8	2
Western Heelers	0	0	1	1	0	6	2	0	X	10	10	2
WP: Brendan THOMAS (1-0) LP: Calvin CHIPPERFIELD (0-1) Sv: - Home runs: SA: 0 Heelers: 0 Attendance: -

=== Game 10: Feb 06, 2002 ===
Team	1	2	3	4	5	6	7	8	9	R	H	E
New South Wales Patriots	0	0	0	0	0	0	0	0	0	0	6	0
Western Heelers	0	0	0	0	0	0	0	0	1	1	7	1
WP: Shane TONKIN (1-0) LP: Chris BRADLEY (0-1) Sv: - Home runs: Patriots: 0 Heelers: 0 Attendance: -

=== Game 11: Feb 06, 2002 at Napier Park ===
Team	1	2	3	4	5	6	7	8	9	R	H	E
Australia Provincial	0	0	0	1	0	3	0	1	0	5	6	0
Victoria Aces	0	1	0	1	0	0	1	4	X	10	13	2
WP: Adam BLACKLEY (1-0) LP: Chad ROBERTS (0-1) Sv: - Home runs: Provincial: 0 Aces: 0 Attendance: 800

=== Game 12: Feb 06, 2002 ===
Team	1	2	3	4	5	6	7	8	9	R	H	E
Queensland Rams	0	0	0	0	0	1	0	3	1	5	6	1
South Australia	1	1	0	0	0	0	0	2	0	4	5	3
WP: John VEITCH (1-0) LP: Dylan MARTIN (0-1) Sv: - Home runs: Rams: 0 SA: 0 Attendance: -

=== Game 13: Feb 07, 2002 ===
Team	1	2	3	4	5	6	7	8	9	R	H	E
Australia Provincial	0	0	1	0	0	0	0	0	0	1	5	1
New South Wales Patriots	0	0	3	0	0	0	0	1	X	4	6	0
WP: David THORNE (1-0) LP: Simon FLYNN (0-1) Sv: - Home runs: Provincial: 0 Patriots: 0 Attendance: -

=== Game 14: Feb 07, 2002 ===
Team	1	2	3	4	5	6	7	8	9	R	H	E
Western Heelers	0	0	1	0	0	0	5	1	1	8	16	2
Queensland Rams	0	1	0	0	3	0	4	0	0	8	10	5
WP: - (1-0) LP: - (0-1) Sv: - Home runs: Heelers: 0 Rams: 0 Attendance: 76

== Ladder ==
Team	Played	Wins	Loss	Draw	Win %
Victorian Aces	4	4	0	0	1.000
Western Heelers	5	3	1	1	.700
Queensland Rams	5	2	2	1	.500
South Australia	4	2	2	0	.500
New South Wales Patriots	4	2	3	0	.400
Australian Provincial	5	0	5	0	.000

== Championship series ==
=== Game 15: Feb 08, 2002 - Playoff 1st v 4th ===
Team	1	2	3	4	5	6	7	8	9	R	H	E
South Australia	0	1	1	0	0	0	0	0	0	2	7	1
Victoria Aces	1	1	0	0	1	0	1	1	X	5	8	0
WP: David McWATTERS (1-0) LP: Darren FIDGE (0-1) Sv: - Home runs: SA: 0 Aces: 0 Attendance: 400

=== Game 16: Feb 08, 2002 - Playoff 2nd v 3rd ===
Team	1	2	3	4	5	6	7	8	9	R	H	E
Queensland Rams	1	0	0	0	0	0	0	0	0	1	7	3
Western Heelers	0	2	6	0	0	0	0	0	X	8	12	0
WP: Brendan THOMAS (1-0) LP: Phil STOCKMAN (0-1) Sv: - Home runs: Rams: 0 Heelers: 0 Attendance: 83

=== Game 17: Feb 09, 2002 - Championship Game - Winner Game 15 Vs Winner Game 16 ===
Team	1	2	3	4	5	6	7	8	9	R	H	E
Western Heelers	0	3	0	0	0	0	1	0	1	5	12	3
Victorian Aces	2	0	0	0	0	0	3	0	1	6	8	2
WP: Greg WILTSHIRE (1-0) LP: Shane TONKIN (0-1) Sv: - Home runs: Heelers: 0 Aces: 0 Attendance: 578

::*Box Score

== Awards ==
Award	Person	Team
Batting Champion	Paul Gonzalez	Queensland Rams
Golden Glove	Mark Dries	Australian Provincial
Most Valuable Player	Rod Van Buizen	New South Wales Patriots
Championship M.V.P.	Brett Tamburrino	Victorian Aces
Pitcher of the Year	Shane Tonkin	Western Heelers

== Top Stats ==
Defensive Stats
Name	Wins	Losses	Saves	ERA
David McWatters	2	0	0	2.77
Greg Wiltshire	1	0	0	2.89
David White	1	0	3	5.14
Matthew Wilkinson	1	0	0	4.15
Rikki Johnston	0	0	0	0.00
Andrew Dewar	0	0	0	3.00

Offensive Stars
Name	Avg	HR	RBI
John Edwards	.429	1	5
Scott Dawes	.412	0	2
Adam Burton	.385	1	6
Myles Barnden	.375	1	6
Jarrod Hodges	.353	0	1
Brett Tamburrino	.333	0	4

== All-Star Team ==
Position	Name	Team
Catcher	Scott Dawes	Victoria Aces
1st Base	Paul Gonzalez	Queensland Rams
2nd Base	Luke Hughes	Western Heelers
3rd Base	Mark Dries	Australian Provincial
Short Stop	Rod Van Buizen	New South Wales Patriots
Out Field	Scott Peace	Australian Provincial
Out Field	John Edwards	Victoria Aces
Out Field	Adam Burton	Victoria Aces
Designated Hitter	Ben Wigmore	South Australia
Starting Pitcher	Shane Tonkin	Western Heelers
Relief Pitcher	David White	Victoria Aces
Manager	Phil Allen	Victoria Aces
