= 2003 Claxton Shield =

2003 Claxton Shield teams

The Claxton Shield is an annual competition held by the Australian Baseball Federation. The 2003 Shield reverted to its original form for the first time since 1988, due to the folding of the International Baseball League of Australia. The Shield was held in New South Wales at the Blacktown Olympic Park Baseball Stadium between 26 January to 1 February 2003.

== Ladder - After Round Robin ==
Team	Played	Wins	Loss	Draw	Win %
Victorian Aces	5				
New South Wales Patriots	5				
Queensland Rams	5				
Perth Heat	5				
South Australia	5				
Australian Provincial	5				

== Championship series ==
=== Game 16: 31 January 2003 - Cut Throat Final 1st v 4th ===
Team	1	2	3	4	5	6	7	8	9	R	H	E
Perth Heat	?	?	?	?	?	?	?	?	?	1	?	?
Victoria Aces	?	?	?	?	?	?	?	?	?	7	?	?
WP: ? (1–0) LP: ? (0–1) Sv: None; Home runs: Away: 0 Aces: 0 Attendance: Unknown

=== Game 17: 31 January 2003 - Cut Throat Final 2nd v 3rd ===
Team	1	2	3	4	5	6	7	8	9	R	H	E
Queensland Rams	?	?	?	?	?	?	?	?	?	2	?	?
NSW Patriots	?	?	?	?	?	?	?	?	?	0	?	?
WP: ? (1–0) LP: ? (0–1) Sv: - Home runs: Rams: 0 Patriots: 0 Attendance: Unknown

=== Game 18: 1 February 2003 - Championship Game - Winner 1 vs 4 Vs Winner 2 vs 3 ===
Team	1	2	3	4	5	6	7	8	9	R	H	E
Queensland Rams	?	?	?	?	?	?	?	?	?	5	?	?
Victoria Aces	?	?	?	?	?	?	?	?	?	4	?	?
WP: ? (1–0) LP: ? (0–1) Sv: - Home runs: Rams: 0 Aces: 0 Attendance: Unknown

::*Box Score

== Awards ==
Award	Person	Team
Most Valuable Player	Craig LEWIS	New South Wales Patriots
Championship M.V.P.	P.J BEVIS	Queensland Rams
Batting Champion	Craig LEWIS	New South Wales Patriots
Golden Glove	Craig LEWIS	New South Wales Patriots
Pitcher of the Year	John VEITCH	Queensland Rams

== Top Stats ==
Defensive Stats
Name	Wins	Losses	Saves	ERA
John VEITCH	1	0	0	3.12
Rikki JOHNSTONE	1	0	0	2.84
Shane TONKIN	1	1	1	2.16
Daniel REDDEN	1	0	1	1.00
Matt WILKINSON	1	0	0	1.35
Travis BLACKLEY	1	1	0	1.42

Offensive Stars
Name	Avg	HR	RBI
Craig LEWIS	.565	3	8
Tom BRICE	.500	0	0
Trent OELTJEN	.476	1	5
Ben WIGMORE	.435	1	6
Luke HUGHES	.429	0	5
Rodney NAN BUIZEN	.407	0	4

== All-Star Team ==
Position	Name	Team
Catcher	Ben Wigmore	South Australia
1st Base	Craig Lewis	New South Wales Patriots
2nd Base	Rod Van Buizen	New South Wales Patriots
3rd Base	Brendan Kingman	New South Wales Patriots
Short Stop	Adam Blight	Australian Provincial
Out Field	John Edwards	Victoria Aces
Out Field	Trent Oeltjen	New South Wales Patriots
Out Field	David Sutherland	Queensland Rams
Designated Hitter	Tom Brice	South Australia
Starting Pitcher	Shane Tonkin	Western Heelers
Relief Pitcher	P.J Bevis	Queensland Rams
Manager	David Nilsson	Queensland Rams
