= 2010–11 Australian Baseball League team rosters =

The Australian Baseball League logo.

The 2010–11 Australian Baseball League season will be the inaugural season of the re-launched Australian Baseball League, contested between six teams representing the mainland national and state capitals: Adelaide Bite, Brisbane Bandits, Canberra Cavalry, Melbourne Aces, Perth Heat and Sydney Blue Sox. Each of the teams take the place of one of the state teams from the 2010 Claxton Shield, with the exception of Canberra which was introduced as a new team. Clubs form a roster of up to 35; of which 22 will comprise the active roster named for each of the ten rounds of the regular season and each series of the finals for those teams that qualify.

== Adelaide Bite ==
Adelaide Bite roster – 2010–11 ABL
Active roster		Inactive roster	Coaching Staff
Pitchers Right-handed pitchers: -- (Australia) Tom Becker; 37 (United States) Mark Brackman; 18 (United States) Reed Brown; 14 (Australia) Darren Fidge; 24 (Australia) Chris Lawson; -- (Australia) Wilson Lee; 31 (United States) Brandon Maurer; 33 (Australia) Wayne Ough; 38 (Australia) Dushan Ruzic; Left-handed pitchers: 34 (Australia) Adrian Burnside; -- (Australia) Lachlan Eldridge; 25 (Australia) Paul Mildren	Catchers: 29 (United States) Brandon Bantz; 19 (Australia) Brendan Pett; Infielders: 6 (Australia) Josh Cakebread; 1 (Australia) Jeremy Cresswell; -- (Australia) Scott Gladstone; 11 (United States) Todd Gossage; 39 (South Korea) Kwak Yong-Sup; 22 (Australia) Stefan Welch; Outfielders: 21 (Australia) Tom Brice; 16 (United States) Quincy Latimore; 23 (United States) James McOwen	Pitchers: 8 (Australia) Jackson Lodge; -- (Australia) Greg Mosel; 27 (Australia) Ryan Murphy; 15 (Australia) Nick Talbot; 13 (Australia) Josh Tols; Catchers: -- (United States) Alex Derhak; -- (Australia) Troy Wienert; Infielders: 4 (Australia) Mathew Smith; -- (Australia) Jesse Duval; Outfielders: 5 (Australia) Ben Wigmore; 20 (Australia) Daniel Wilson	Manager: 2 (Australia) Tony Harris; Coaches: 16 (Australia) Warwick Marks (pitching coach); 10 (Australia) Mark Haylock (assistant coach); 12 (Australia) Craig Watts (assistant coach)
Current as of 23 January 2011.

== Brisbane Bandits ==
Brisbane Bandits roster – 2010–11 ABL
Active roster		Inactive Roster	Coaching Staff
Pitchers Right-handed pitchers: 12 (Australia) James Albury; 24 (Australia) Simon Morriss; 34 (Australia) Chris Mowday; 35 (Australia) Drew Naylor; 22 (Australia) Ryan Searle; 39 (Australia) Phil Stockman; 31 (Australia) Aaron Thompson; 32 (Australia) John Veitch; 26 (Australia) Josh Warner; Left-handed pitchers: 7 (Australia) Chris Lamb	Catchers: 29 (Australia) Ryan Battaglia; 18 (Australia) Mitchell Nilsson; Infielders: 17 (Australia) Andrew Campbell; 21 (Australia) Brad Dutton; 10 (Australia) Wade Dutton; 33 (Australia) Rory Rhodes; 8 (Australia) Alan Schoenberger; 43 (Australia) David Sutherland; Outfielders: 6 (Australia) Trent Baker; 27 (United States) Chad Gabriel; 19 (Australia) Joshua Roberts; 13 (Australia) Shayne Watson	Pitchers: -- (Australia) Jeremy Atkinson; -- (Australia) Steven Chambers; 1 (Japan) Reo Chikada; 16 (South Africa) Justin Erasmus; -- (Australia) Matthew Gahan; 28 (Japan) Hiroki Yamada; Catchers: -- (Australia) Kieran Bradford; 25 (Australia) Joel Naughton; Infielders: 6 (Japan) Shuhei Fukuda; 9 (Australia) Daniel Lamb-Hunt; Outfielders: 7 (Japan) Akira Nakamura	Manager: 14 (Australia) Dave Nilsson; Coaches: 37 (Australia) Gary Nilsson (pitching coach); 11 (Australia) Kevin Jordan (coach); 20 (Australia) Andrew Utting (coach)
Current as of 23 January 2011.

== Canberra Cavalry ==
Canberra Cavalry roster – 2010–11 ABL
Active roster		Inactive roster	Coaching staff
Pitchers Right-handed pitchers: 12 (Australia) Tim Atherton; 17 (Australia) Hayden Beard; 21 (Australia) Phil Brassington; 43 (Australia) Jarrett Commane; 9 (Australia) Tom Edwards; 29 (South Korea) Heo Jun-Hyeok; 31 (South Korea) Jin Myung-Ho; 27 (Australia) Chris Kimpton; 28 (South Korea) Lee Jung-Min; Left-handed pitchers: 26 (Australia) Chris Morgan; 41 (India) Rinku Singh	Catchers: 18 (Australia) Michael Collins; 20 (South Korea) Jang Sung-Woo; Infielders: 19 (Australia) Byron Aird; 5 (Netherlands) Didi Gregorius; 16 (South Korea) Moon Kyu-Hyun; 35 (Canada) Tylor Prudhomme; 7 (United States) Andrew Schmidt; Outfielders: 10 (Australia) Nick Kimpton; 1 (South Korea) Lee Seung-Hwa; 40 (United States) Donald Lutz; 9 (Australia) Tom Vincent	Pitchers: 15 (Australia) Dan Bradley; 24 (Australia) Mitchell Bray; 33 (Australia) Matthew Fawcett; 22 (Australia) Steven Kent; 23 (Australia) Michael Lennox; 8 (Australia) Alex Rogers; 6 (Australia) Luke Wilkins; Catchers: 11 (Australia) Kyle Perkins; Infielders: 2 (Australia) Jason Sloan; 4 (United States) David Washington	Manager: 37 (United States) Steve Schrenk; Coaches: 13 (Australia) Brent Phelan (coach); -- (Australia) Keith Ward (coach); 14 (Australia) Michael Wells (coach); 7-day disabled list: -- (Australia) Nathan Crawford; 14 (Australia) Michael Wells; 3 (Canada) Ian Choy
Correct as of 23 January 2011.

== Melbourne Aces ==
Melbourne Aces roster – 2010–11 ABL
Active roster		Inactive roster	Coaching Staff
Pitchers Right-handed pitchers: 9 (Australia) Blake Cunningham; -- (Australia) Cameron Forbes; 30 (United States) Jeff Jamnik; 42 (Australia) Shane Lindsay; 35 (United States) David Miller; 47 (Japan) Tetsu Nishikawa; 17 (Australia) Russell Spear; 40 (Australia) Greg Wiltshire; Left-handed pitchers: 11 (Australia) Adam Bright; 22 (Australia) Adam Blackley; 32 (United States) Brad Hertzler; 41 (United States) Nicholas Martin	Catchers: 26 (Australia) Grant Karlsen; 38 (Australia) Tristan McDonald; Infielders: 5 (Australia) James Beresford; 12 (Australia) Josh Davies; 16 (Australia) Justin Huber; 10 (Australia) Matthew Lawman; 25 (Australia) Brett Tamburrino; 7 (Australia) Scott Wearne; Outfielders: 33 (Australia) Elliot Biddle; 3 (Australia) Andrew Russell; 35 (Australia) Paul Rutgers	Pitchers: -- (Australia) Travis Blackley; 18 (Australia) Matthew Blackmore; 42 (Australia) Cody Hams; 36 (Australia) Donovan Hendricks; 33 (Japan) Masumi Hoshino; 34 (Japan) Norihito Kaneto; 28 (Australia) Brendan McDonald; -- (Australia) Daniel McGrath; -- (Australia) Peter Moylan; 63 (Japan) Jumpei Ono; -- (Australia) David Whigham; Catchers: 6 (Australia) Joshua Hendricks; Infielders: 4 (Australia) Hayden Dingle; 15 (Japan) Takahiro Ijyuin; 27 (Australia) Glenn Mascoll; -- (Australia) Jacob Sheldon-Collins; 2 (Australia) Andrew Tearney; Outfielders: 21 (Australia) Nathan Aron; 13 (Japan) Itaru Hashimoto; -- (Japan) Yoshiyuki Kamei	Manager: 43 (Australia) Phil Dale; Coaches: 33 (Australia) Lee Hogan (pitching coach); 19 (Australia) Phil Allen (coach); 39 (Australia) Neil Burke (coach); -- (Australia) David Clarkson (coach); 20 (Australia) Damian Shanahan (coach)
Current as of 23 January 2011.

== Perth Heat ==
Perth Heat roster – 2010–11 ABL
Roster		Coaching Staff
Pitchers Right-handed pitchers: 31 (Australia) Tyler Anderson; 15 (Australia) Benn Grice; 18 (Australia) Liam Hendriks; 39 (United States) Brett Jacobson; 33 (United States) Matt Krueger; 09 (Australia) Cameron Lamb; 41 (Australia) Adam Millson; -- (United States) Benjamin Moore; 30 (Australia) Warwick Saupold; 19 (Australia) Robert Sorensen; 14 (Australia) Dean White; 21 (Australia) Brendan Wise; 22 (United States) Matt Zachary; Left-handed pitchers: 20 (Australia) Liam Baron*; 6 (United States) Trevor Caughey; 28 (Australia) Nathan Driessen; 37 (United States) Cole McCurry; 26 (Australia) Daniel Schmidt	Catchers: 11 (Australia) Allan de San Miguel*; 7 (Australia) Matt Kennelly*; 8 (United States) Ryne Price; Infielders: 25 (Australia) Clint Balgera*; 3 (Australia) Aaron Bonomi; -- (Australia) Lachlan Dale; 2 (Australia) Mitchell Graham*; 29 (Australia) Luke Hughes*; 29 (United States) Evan McArthur*; 12 (United States) Robbie Widlansky*; Outfielders: -- (Australia) Corey Adamson; -- (Australia) Jesse Barron; 27 (Australia) Brandon Dale*; 20 (Australia) Darcy Doyle*; 33 (Australia) Elliot Hargreaves; 23 (Australia) Tim Kennelly; 24 (United States) Ronnie Welty	Manager: 13 (United States) Brooke Knight; Coaches: 8 (Australia) Clayton Barnes (coach); 5 (Australia) Don Kyle (coach)
Correct as of 30 May 2011. * - Opening day starters

== Sydney Blue Sox ==
Sydney Blue Sox roster – 2010–11 ABL
Roster		Coaching staff
Pitchers Right-handed pitchers: 43 (Australia) Paul Anderson; -- (Australia) Shane Benson; 32 (Australia) Todd Grattan; 51 (Australia) Vaughan Harris; 36 (Australia) Wayne Lundgren; 35 (Australia) Chris Oxspring^{*}; 4 (Australia) Aaron Sookee; 29 (Australia) Tim Stanford; 10 (Australia) Jarryd Sullivan; 24 (Australia) Rich Thompson; 12 (Australia) Todd Van Steensel; 19 (Australia) Matthew Williams; Left-handed pitchers: 41 (Australia) Craig Anderson; 30 (South Korea) Koo Dae-sung; 1 (Australia) Matthew Rae; 45 (Australia) David Welch	Catchers: 11 (Australia) Trent D'Antonio^{*}; 17 (Australia) Andrew Graham^{*}; 23 (Australia) Alex Johnson; Infielders: 14 (Australia) Joshua Dean; 21 (Australia) Mark Holland^{*}; -- (Australia) Brendan Kingman; 16 (Australia) Michael Lysaught^{*}; 20 (Australia) Patrick Maat^{*}; 2 (Australia) Shannon Pender; 34 (Australia) Jacob Younis; Outfielders: 33 (Australia) Tim Auty^{*}; 9 (Australia) Mitch Dening^{*}; 25 (Australia) David Kandilas^{*}; 27 (Australia) Boss Moanaroa^{*}; 8 (Australia) Moko Moanaroa; 42 (Australia) Trent Oeltjen; 3 (Australia) Trent Schmutter	Manager: 18 (Australia) Glenn Williams; Coaches: 35 (Australia) Chris Oxspring (pitching coach); 7 (Australia) Graheme Cassel (coach); 6 (Australia) Jason Pospishil (coach); 38 (Australia) Shaun Smith (coach)
Correct as of 29 May 2011. * - Opening day starters
