= 2010–11 Sydney Blue Sox season =

2010–11 Sydney Blue Sox
- Minor premiership
- League: Australian Baseball League
- Ballpark: Blacktown International Sportspark Sydney
- City: Blacktown, New South Wales
- Record: 24–15 (.615)
- League place: 1st
- Owner: ABL
- Manager: Glenn Williams
- Radio: Triple H FM

The 2010–11 Sydney Blue Sox season was the team's first season. The Blue Sox competed in the Australian Baseball League (ABL) against five other teams, playing its home games at Blacktown International Sportspark Sydney.

== Regular season ==
=== Standings ===
2010–11 regular season standings
| Team | Pld | HW | HL | AW | AL | GB | PCT | Qualification |
|---|---|---|---|---|---|---|---|---|
| Sydney Blue Sox | **39** | **12** | **7** | **12** | **8** | — | .615 (Note: The third game played between Sydney and Melbourne in round 4 was called a tie with a score of 1–1 under ABL rule 5-6-8. The result is not counted towards the teams' standings. A game postponed from round 4, held in round 5, was played with the Melbourne Aces as the away team and the Sydney Blue Sox as the home team, despite being played at the Melbourne Showgrounds.) | **Major semi final berth** |
| Perth Heat | 40 | 10 | 10 | 14 | 6 | 0.5 | .600 | **Major semi final berth** |
| Adelaide Bite | 40 | 15 | 5 | 8 | 12 | 1.5 | .575 (Note: A game postponed from round 4, held in round 7, was played with the Adelaide Bite as the away team and the Canberra Cavalry as the home team, despite being played at Coopers Stadium, Adelaide.) (Note: Two games postponed from round 5, held in round 10, were played with the Adelaide Bite as the away team and the Brisbane Bandits as the home team, despite being played at Coopers Stadium, Adelaide.) | Minor semi final berth |
| Melbourne Aces | 39 | 11 | 9 | 7 | 12 | 6 | .462 | Minor semi final berth |
| Brisbane Bandits | 36 | 6 | 10 | 8 | 12 | 8.5 | .389 | |
| Canberra Cavalry | 36 | 11 | 9 | 1 | 15 | 10.5 | .333 | |

==== Record vs opponents ====
| Opponent | W–L Record | Largest Victory | | | Largest Defeat | | | Current Streak |
| Opponent | W–L Record | Score | Date | Ground | Score | Date | Ground | Current Streak |
|---|---|---|---|---|---|---|---|---|
| Adelaide Bite | 6-2 | 5-0 | 17 December 2010 | Diamond Sports Stadium | 3-7 | 18 December 2010 | Diamond Sports Stadium | W5 |
| Brisbane Bandits | 4-4 | 4-0 | 19 November 2010 | Brisbane Exhibition Ground | 3-12 | 27 November 2010 | Blue Sox Stadium | W1 |
| Canberra Cavalry | 7-1 | 13-3 | 13 November 2010 | Blue Sox Stadium | 1-5 | 20 January 2011 | Narrabundah Ballpark | W3 |
| Melbourne Aces | 3-4 | 4-1 | 11 December 2010 | Melbourne Ballpark | 3-18 | 12 December 2010 | Melbourne Ballpark | L2 |
| Perth Heat | 4-4 | 8-1 | 30 December 2010 | Baseball Park | 7-11 | 7 January 2011 | Blue Sox Stadium | L4 |
| | | 10-3 | 2 January 2011 | Baseball Park | | | | |
| Total | 24-15 | Canberra Cavalry | | | Melbourne Aces | | | W3 |
| Total | 24-15 | 13-3 | 13 November 2010 | Blue Sox Stadium | 3-18 | 12 December 2010 | Melbourne Ballpark | W3 |

=== Game log ===
| W | Blue Sox win |
| L | Blue Sox loss |
| T | Blue Sox tie |
| | Game postponed |
| **Bold** | Blue Sox team member |

2010–11 Game Log
November

| # | Date | Opponent | Score | Win | Loss | Save | Record | Ref |
|---|---|---|---|---|---|---|---|---|
| 1 | 6 November | Cavalry | 1-0 | **W. Lundgren** | J. Heo | **D. Koo** | 1-0 | Archived 9 September 2017 at the Wayback Machine |
| 2 | 12 November | Cavalry | 4-2 | **C. Oxspring** | J. Heo | **D. Koo** | 2-0 | Archived 9 September 2017 at the Wayback Machine |
| 3 | 13 November | Cavalry | 13-3 | **W. Lundgren** | P. Brassington | - | 3-0 | Archived 9 September 2017 at the Wayback Machine |
| 4 | 14 November | Cavalry | 7-5 | **A. Sookee** | T. Atherton | **D. Koo** | 4-0 | Archived 9 September 2017 at the Wayback Machine |
| 5 | 18 November | @ Bandits | 5-9 | J. Albury | **W. Lundgren** | - | 4-1 | Archived 9 September 2017 at the Wayback Machine |
| 6 | 19 November | @ Bandits (DH 1) | 3-4 | C. Mowday | **D. Koo** | - | 4-2 | Archived 9 September 2017 at the Wayback Machine |
| 7 | 19 November | @ Bandits (DH 2) | 4-0 | **C. Oxspring** | R. Searle | - | 5-2 | Archived 9 September 2017 at the Wayback Machine |
| 8 | 21 November | @ Bandits | 2-0 | **C. Anderson** | J. Erasmus | **D. Koo** | 6-2 | Archived 9 September 2017 at the Wayback Machine |
| 9 | 26 November | Bandits | 1-6 | J. Albury | **W. Lundgren** | - | 6-3 | Archived 9 September 2017 at the Wayback Machine |
| 10 | 27 November | Bandits (DH 1) | 3-1 | **D. Welch** | R. Searle | **D. Koo** | 7-3 | Archived 9 September 2017 at the Wayback Machine |
| 11 | 27 November | Bandits (DH 2) | 3-12 | C. Mowday | **M. Williams** | - | 7-4 | Archived 9 September 2017 at the Wayback Machine |
| 12 | 28 November | Bandits | 1-0 | **V. Harris** | J. Erasmus | - | 8-4 | Archived 9 September 2017 at the Wayback Machine |

December

| # | Date | Opponent | Score | Win | Loss | Save | Record | Ref |
|---|---|---|---|---|---|---|---|---|
| 13 | 3 December | Aces | 3-1 | **C. Oxspring** | A. Blackley | **D. Koo** | 9-4 | Archived 9 September 2017 at the Wayback Machine |
| 14 | 4 December | Aces (DH 1) | PPD - RAIN | - | - | - | - | Archived 9 September 2017 at the Wayback Machine |
| 15 | 4 December | Aces (DH 2) | PPD - RAIN | - | - | - | - | Archived 9 September 2017 at the Wayback Machine |
| 16 | 5 December | Aces (DH 1) | 2-1 | **W. Lundgren** | J. Ono | **D. Koo** | 10-4 | |
| 17 | 5 December | Aces (DH 2) | 1-1 | - | - | - | 10-4 | |
| 18 | 10 December | @ Aces | 4-6 | A. Bright | **M. Rae** | - | 10-5 | Archived 9 September 2017 at the Wayback Machine |
| 19 | 11 December | @ Aces (DH 1) | 6-7 | M. Hoshino | **T. Van Steensel** | - | 10-6 | Archived 9 September 2017 at the Wayback Machine |
| 20 | 11 December | @ Aces (DH 2) | 4-1 | **D. Welch** | T. Blackley | **D. Koo** | 11-6 | Archived 9 September 2017 at the Wayback Machine |
| 21 | 12 December | @ Aces (DH 1) | 5-12 | M. Blackmore | **C. Anderson** | - | 11-7 | Archived 9 September 2017 at the Wayback Machine |
| 22 | 12 December | @ Aces (DH 2) | 3-18 | J. Ono | **V. Harris** | - | 11-8 | Archived 9 September 2017 at the Wayback Machine |
| 23 | 16 December | @ Bite | 3-4 | D. Ruzic | **V. Harris** | - | 11-9 | Archived 9 September 2017 at the Wayback Machine |
| 24 | 17 December | @ Bite | 5-0 | **D. Welch** | P. Mildren | | 12-9 | Archived 9 September 2017 at the Wayback Machine |
| 25 | 18 December | @ Bite | 3-7 | B. Maurer | **W. Lundgren** | - | 12-10 | Archived 9 September 2017 at the Wayback Machine |
| 26 | 19 December | @ Bite | 4-0 | **C. Anderson** | D. Ruzic | - | 13-10 | |
| 27 | 30 December | @ Heat | 8-1 | **C. Oxspring** | L. Hendriks | - | 14-10 | Archived 9 September 2017 at the Wayback Machine |
| 28 | 31 December | @ Heat | 5-1 | **D. Welch** | D. Schmidt | D. Koo | 15-10 | Archived 9 September 2017 at the Wayback Machine |

January

| # | Date | Opponent | Score | Win | Loss | Save | Record | Ref |
|---|---|---|---|---|---|---|---|---|
| 29 | 1 January | @ Heat | 3-2 | **D. Koo** | M. Zachary | - | 16-10 | Archived 9 September 2017 at the Wayback Machine |
| 30 | 2 January | @ Heat | 10-3 | **C. Anderson** | W. Saupold | - | 17-10 | Archived 9 September 2017 at the Wayback Machine |
| 31 | 6 January | Heat | 1-3 | T. Caughey | **C. Oxspring** | B. Wise | 17-11 | Archived 9 September 2017 at the Wayback Machine |
| 32 | 7 January | Heat | 7-11 | D. Schmidt | **M. Williams** | - | 17-12 | Archived 9 September 2017 at the Wayback Machine |
| 33 | 8 January | Heat | 3-4 | C. McCurry | **W. Lundgren** | B. Wise | 17-13 | Archived 9 September 2017 at the Wayback Machine |
| 34 | 9 January | Heat | 1-4 | M. Zachary | **C. Anderson** | - | 17-14 | Archived 9 September 2017 at the Wayback Machine |
| 35 | 12 January | Bite | 5-4 | **R. Thompson** | T. Becker | - | 18-14 | Archived 9 September 2017 at the Wayback Machine |
| 36 | 13 January | Bite | 4-3 | **D. Welch** | P. Mildren | - | 19-14 | Archived 9 September 2017 at the Wayback Machine |
| 37 | 14 January | Bite | 6-5 | **J. Sullivan** | D. Fidge | - | 20-14 | Archived 9 September 2017 at the Wayback Machine |
| 38 | 15 January | Bite | 6-2 | **W. Lundgren** | D. Ruzic | - | 21-14 | Archived 9 September 2017 at the Wayback Machine |
| 39 | 20 January | @ Cavalry | 1-5 | J. Lee | **C. Oxspring** | T. Atherton | 21-15 | Archived 9 September 2017 at the Wayback Machine |
| 40 | 21 January | @ Cavalry | 10-3 | **T. Grattan** | H. Beard | **D. Koo** | 22-15 | Archived 9 September 2017 at the Wayback Machine |
| 41 | 22 January | @ Cavalry (DH 1) | 5-4 | **D. Koo** | T. Atherton | - | 23-15 | Archived 9 September 2017 at the Wayback Machine |
| 42 | 22 January | @ Cavalry (DH 2) | 4-2 | **V. Harris** | J. Lee | **D. Koo** | 24-15 | Archived 9 September 2017 at the Wayback Machine |

== Postseason ==
2010–11 Major Semi-Final Series Game Log
January

| # | Date | Opponent | Score | Win | Loss | Save | Record | Ref |
|---|---|---|---|---|---|---|---|---|
| 1 | 27 January | Heat | 2-4 | B. Grice | C. Oxspring | B. Wise | 0-1 | Archived 9 September 2017 at the Wayback Machine |
| 2 | 28 January | @ Heat | 2-9 | T. Caughey | W. Lundgren | - | 0-2 | Archived 9 September 2017 at the Wayback Machine |

2010–11 Preliminary Final Series Game Log
February

| # | Date | Opponent | Score | Win | Loss | Save | Record | Ref |
|---|---|---|---|---|---|---|---|---|
| 1 | 4 February | Bite | 8-0 | D. Welch | M. Brackman | - | 1-0 | Archived 9 September 2017 at the Wayback Machine |
| 2 | 5 February | @ Bite | 0-4 | B. Maurer | W. Lundgren | - | 1-1 | Archived 9 September 2017 at the Wayback Machine |
| 3 | 6 February | Bite | 4-7 | M. Brackman | D. Koo | - | 1-2 | Archived 9 September 2017 at the Wayback Machine |

Semi-Final Series; 27–28 January 2011
1 | Sydney Blue Sox | 0
2 | Perth Heat | 2
3 | Adelaide Bite | 2
4 | Melbourne Aces | 0

Premliminary Final Series; 4–6 February 2011
1 | Sydney Blue Sox | 1
3 | Adelaide Bite | 2

Championship Series; 11–13 February 2011
2 | Perth Heat | 2
3 | Adelaide Bite | 1

== Roster ==
Sydney Blue Sox roster – 2014–15 ABL
| Active roster | | Reserve players | Coaching staff |
| Pitchers Right-handed pitchers: 43 (United States) Paul Anderson; 28 (Australia) Shane Benson; 32 (Australia) Todd Grattan; 13 (Australia) Vaughan Harris; 36 (Australia) Wayne Lundgren; 35 (Australia) Chris Oxspring; — (Australia) Aaron Sookee; — (Australia) Jarryd Sullivan; — (Australia) Rich Thompson; — (Australia) Todd Van Steensel; 19 (Australia) Matt Williams; Left-handed pitchers: 31 (Australia) Craig Anderson; 30 (South Korea) Dae-Sung Koo; — (Australia) Matthew Rae; — (Australia) David Welch | Catchers: 11 (Australia) Trent D’Antonio; 10 (Australia) Andrew Graham; 20 (Australia) Patrick Maat; Infielders: 14 (Australia) Joshua Dean; — (Australia) Mark Holland; 23 (Australia) Alex Johnson; — (Australia) Brendan Kingman; 2 (Australia) Shannon Prender; — (Australia) Jacob Younis; Outfielders: 33 (Australia) Timothy Auty; — (Australia) Mitchell Dening; 25 (Australia) David Kandilas; 27 (Australia) Boss Moanaroa; — (Australia) Moko Moanaroa; — (Australia) Trent Oeltjen; 3 (Australia) Trent Schmutter | Infielders: — (Australia) Michael Lysaught | Manager: Glenn Williams; Coaches: Chris Oxspring (Pitching Coach); Jason Pospishil; Shaun Smith; Grahame Cassel; : 7-day disabled list : reassigned |
7 September 2017
