= 2013–14 Sydney Blue Sox season =

2013–14 Sydney Blue Sox
- League: Australian Baseball League
- Ballpark: Blacktown International Sportspark Sydney
- City: Blacktown, New South Wales
- Record: 23–23 (.500)
- Place: 2nd
- Owner: ABL
- Manager: Jason Pospishil
- Radio: Triple H FM

The 2013–14 Sydney Blue Sox season was the team's fourth season. The Blue Sox competed in the Australian Baseball League (ABL) against five other teams, playing its home games at Blacktown International Sportspark Sydney.

== Regular season ==
=== Standings ===
Pos	Team	Pld	W	L	PCT	GB	Qualification
1	Perth Heat	46	32	14	.696	—	Advance to Championship Series
**2**	Sydney Blue Sox	**46**	**23**	**23**	.500	**9**	**Advance to Preliminary final**
3	Canberra Cavalry	46	22	24	.478	10	**Advance to Preliminary final**
4	Melbourne Aces	46	22	24	.478	10	
5	Adelaide Bite	46	21	25	.457	11	
6	Brisbane Bandits	46	18	28	.391	14	

==== Record vs opponents ====
Opponent	W–L Record	Largest Victory			Largest Defeat			Current Streak
Opponent	W–L Record	Score	Date	Ground	Score	Date	Ground	Current Streak
Adelaide Bite	4-4	8-1	16 January 2014	Diamond Sports Stadium	2-7	19 January 2014	Diamond Sports Stadium	L2
Brisbane Bandits	7-4	7-2	17 November 2013	Brisbane Exhibition Ground	2-9	28 December 2013	Blue Sox Stadium	L1
Canberra Cavalry	6-5	11-4	6 December 2013	Narrabundah Ballpark	0-10	10 January 2014	Blue Sox Stadium	W2
		8-1	7 December 2013	Narrabundah Ballpark				
Melbourne Aces	3-5	4-2	25 January 2014	Blue Sox Stadium	2-6	20 December 2013	Melbourne Ballpark	L1
					0-4	21 December 2013	Melbourne Ballpark	
Perth Heat	1-7	11-0	3 November 2013	Baseball Park	0-10	1 November 2013	Baseball Park	L4
Total	23-23	Against Perth			Against Canberra & Perth			L1
Total	23-23	11–0	3 Nov 2013	Baseball Park	0-10 0-10	1 Nov 2013 10 Jan 2014	Baseball Park Blue Sox Stadium	L1

=== Game log ===
W	Blue Sox win
L	Blue Sox loss
T	Blue Sox tie
	Game postponed
	Game cancelled
**Bold**	Blue Sox team member

2013–14 Game Log
November

#	Date	Opponent	Score	Win	Loss	Save	Record	Ref
1	1 November	@ Heat	0-10	M. Ekstrom	**C. Anderson**	-	0-1	
2	2 November	@ Heat (DH 1)	5-4	**L. Wilkins**	L. Baron	**D. Koo**	1-1	
3	2 November	@ Heat (DH 2)	7-2	**C. Whalen**	K. Grendell	-	2-1	
4	3 November	@ Heat	11-0	**A. Sookee**	D. Schmidt	-	3-1	
5	8 November	Cavalry	5-2	**C. Anderson**	B. Grening	**D. Koo**	-	
6	9 November	Cavalry	1-6	E. Cole	**A. Sookee**	-	4-2	
7	10 November	Cavalry	2-4	N. Pugliese	**W. Lundgren**	S. Toler	4-3	
8	15 November	@ Bandits	10-8	**L. Wilkins**	T. Brechbuehler	**D. Koo**	5-3	
9	16 November	@ Bandits	7-6	**J. Guyer**	A. Thompson	**D. Koo**	6-3	
10	17 November	@ Bandits	7-2	**C. Whalen**	C. Barnes	-	7-3	
11	29 November	Heat	0-1	J. Frawley	**C. Anderson**	B. Wise	7-4	
12	30 November	Heat (DH 1)	0-6	M. Ekstrom	**J. Guyer**	-	7-5	
13	30 November	Heat (DH 2)	3-4	A. Claggett	**C. Whalen**	-	7-6	

December

#	Date	Opponent	Score	Win	Loss	Save	Record	Ref
14	1 December	Heat	1-3	D. Schmidt	**A. Sookee**	S. Mitchinson	7-7	
15	5 December	@ Cavalry	5-13	B. Grening	**C. Anderson**	-	7-8	
16	6 December	@ Cavalry	11-4	**C. Whalen**	E. Cole	-	8-8	
17	7 December	@ Cavalry	8-1	**A. Sookee**	J. Lyman	**L. Wilkins**	9-8	
18	8 December	@ Cavalry	7-8	E. Massingham	**M. Rae**	S. Toler	9-9	
19	13 December	Bite	5-1	**C. Anderson**	D. Holman	-	10-9	
20	14 December	Bite	3-5	R. Olson	**C. Whalen**	M. Williams	10-10	
21	15 December	Bite	1-3	B. Holovach	**A. Sookee**	M. Williams	10-11	
22	16 December	Bite	2-1	**V. Harris**	K. Brueggemann	**D. Koo**	11-11	
23	20 December	@ Aces	2-6	J. Burns	**C. Anderson**	-	11-12	
24	21 December	@ Aces (DH 1)	3-2	**C. Whalen**	J. Hussey	**D. Koo**	12-12	
25	21 December	@ Aces (DH 2)	0-4	L. Thorpe	**A. Sookee**	-	12-13	
26	22 December	@ Aces	3-4	F. Flores	**M. Rae**	B. Zawacki	12-14	
27	27 December	Bandits	3-2	**C. Anderson**	M. Jannis	**D. Koo**	13-14	
28	28 December	Bandits	2-9	A. Aizenstadt	**C. Whalen**	-	13-15	
29	29 December	Bandits	1-0	**A. Sookee**	R. Searle	-	14-15	
30	30 December	Bandits	3-4	T. Crawford	**D. Koo**	-	14-16	

January

#	Date	Opponent	Score	Win	Loss	Save	Record	Ref
31	2 January	@ Bandits	5-4	**C. Anderson**	M. Jannis	**D. Koo**	15-16	
32	3 January	@ Bandits	4-5	T. Crawford	**T. Van Steensel**	-	15-17	
33	4 January	@ Bandits	7-5	**A. Sookee**	R. Searle	**D. Koo**	16-17	
34	5 January	@ Bandits	3-7	R. Niit	**J. Guyer**	-	16-18	
35	9 January	Cavalry	4-3	**L. Wilkins**	S. Toler	-	17-18	
36	10 January	Cavalry	0-10	E. Cole	**A. Sookee**	-	17-19	
37	11 January	Cavalry	9-6	**J. Lyons**	S. Chambers	-	18-19	
38	12 January	Cavalry	3-2	**D. Koo**	S. Toler	-	19-19	
39	16 January	@ Bite	8-1	**C. Anderson**	K. Brueggemann	-	20-19	
40	17 January	@ Bite	2-5	R. Olson	**A. Sookee**	-	20-20	
41	18 January	@ Bite	4-0	**C. Whalen**	D. Fidge	-	21-20	
42	19 January	@ Bite	2-7	M. Williams	V. Harris	-	21-21	
43	23 January	Aces	4-3	**W. Lundgren**	T. Holder	**D. Koo**	22-21	
44	24 January	Aces	3-6	J. Hussey	**A. Sookee**	-	22-22	
45	25 January	Aces	4-2	**C. Whalen**	J. Erasmus	**D. Koo**	23-22	
46	26 January	Aces	0-2	F. Flores	**V. Harris**	B. Zawacki	23-23	

== Postseason ==
Three teams in the ABL qualified for a two-round postseason. The highest placed team at the end of the 2013-14 regular season, the Perth Heat gained entry to and hosted the Championship Series. The second and third place teams at the end of the 2013-14 regular season, the Sydney Blue Sox and the Canberra Cavalry, respectively, played a preliminary final series to determine the Perth Heat's opponent in the Championship Series. The Blue Sox fell to the Cavalry 1 game to 2, thus ending the Blue Sox's postseason run and advancing the Cavalry to the Championship Series.

2013–14 Preliminary Final Series Game Log
January/February

#	Date	Opponent	Score	Win	Loss	Save	Record	Ref
1	31 January	Cavalry	18-11	A. Sookee	B. Grening	-	1-0	Archived 2017-09-05 at the Wayback Machine
2	1 February	Cavalry	3-4	E. Cole	L. Baron	S. Toler	1-1	Archived 2017-09-05 at the Wayback Machine
3	2 February	Cavalry	1-9	S. Chambers	V. Harris	C. Everts	1-2	Archived 2017-09-05 at the Wayback Machine

Preliminary Final Series			Championship Series
			1	Perth Heat	2
2	Sydney Blue Sox	1	3	Canberra Cavalry	0
3	Canberra Cavalry	2

== Roster ==
Sydney Blue Sox roster – 2013–14 ABL
Active roster		Reserve players	Coaching staff
Pitchers Right-handed pitchers: 17 (Australia) Josh Guyer; — (Australia) Vaughan Harris; 44 (Australia) Wayne Lundgren; 28 (United States) Jeff Lyons; 4 (Australia) Aaron Sookee; 21 (Australia) Todd Van Steensel; 26 (Australia) Luke Wilkins; Left-handed pitchers: 31 (Australia) Craig Anderson; 30 (South Korea) Dae-Sung Koo; 29 (Australia) Lachlan Wells; 57 (United States) Connor Whalen	Catchers: 66 (United States) Daniel Arribas; 39 (Australia) Guy Edmonds; 22 (Australia) James Philibossian; Infielders: 11 (Australia) Trent D’Antonio; 14 (Australia) Joshua Dean; 18 (United States) Joey DeMichele; 27 (Australia) Boss Moanaroa; 24 (Australia) Zac Shepherd; Outfielders: 8 (United States) Keon Broxton; 9 (Australia) Mitchell Dening; 1 (United States) Jacob May; 10 (Australia) Trent Oeltjen; 3 (Australia) Trent Schmutter	Pitchers: 55 (Australia) Dean Aldridge; 32 (Australia) Todd Grattan; 33 (Australia) Keiran McCluskey; — (Australia) Matthew Rae; Infielders: — (Australia) Michael Lysaught; 34 (Australia) Jacob Younis	Manager: Jason Pospishil; Coaches: Darian Lindsay (Pitching Coach); Glenn Williams (Hitting Coach); Chris Oxspring (Bullpen Coach); Nathan Wright (First Base Coach); Grahame Cassel (Third Base Coach); : 7-day disabled list : reassigned
4 September 2017
