= 2016–17 Sydney Blue Sox season =

2016–17 Sydney Blue Sox
- League: Australian Baseball League
- Ballpark: Blacktown International Sportspark Sydney
- City: Blacktown, New South Wales
- Record: 15–24 (.385)
- Place: 5th
- Owner: ABL
- Manager: Jason Pospishil
- Radio: Triple H FM

The 2016–17 Sydney Blue Sox season was the team's sixth season. The Blue Sox competed in the Australian Baseball League (ABL) with five other teams, playing its home games at Blacktown International Sportspark Sydney.

== Regular season ==
=== Standings ===
Team	Pld	W	L	GB	PCT	Home	Away	Qualification
Melbourne Aces	40	26	14	—	.650	13–7	13–7	Championship Series
Adelaide Bite	40	23	17	3	.575	12–8	11–9	Preliminary final
Brisbane Bandits	39	21	18	4.5	.538	11–8	10–10	Preliminary final
Canberra Cavalry	40	20	20	6	.500	11–9	9–11	
Sydney Blue Sox	**39**	**15**	**24**	**10.5**	.385	**11–9**	**4–15**	
Perth Heat	40	14	26	12	.350	10–10	4–16	

==== Record vs opponents ====
Opponent	W–L Record	Largest Victory			Largest Defeat			Current Streak
Opponent	W–L Record	Score	Date	Ground	Score	Date	Ground	Current Streak
Adelaide Bite	4-4	13-4	18 November 2016	Blue Sox Stadium	3-15	28 January 2017	Diamond Sports Stadium	L3
Brisbane Bandits	3-4	6-2	10 December 2016	Blue Sox Stadium	4-9	12 January 2017	Brisbane Exhibition Ground	L1
Canberra Cavalry	3-5	10-0	25 November 2016	Narrabundah Ballpark	21-11	27 November 2016	Narrabundah Ballpark	W1
Melbourne Aces	1-7	9-2	30 December 2016	Blue Sox Stadium	0-5	18 December 2016	Melbourne Ballpark	L3
					0-5	29 December 2016	Melbourne Ballpark	L3
Perth Heat	4-4	3-0	5 January 2017	Baseball Park	1-5	4 December 2016	Baseball Park	L3
Total	15-24	Adelaide Bite			Adelaide Bite			L3
Total	15-24	13–4	18 November 2016	Blue Sox Stadium	3–15	28 January 2017	Diamond Sports Stadium	L3

=== Game log ===
W	Blue Sox win
L	Blue Sox loss
T	Blue Sox tie
	Game postponed
	Game cancelled
**Bold**	Blue Sox team member

2016–17 Game Log
November

#	Date	Opponent	Score	Win	Loss	Save	Record	Ref
1	18 November	Bite	13-4	**C. Anderson**	S. Callegari	-	1-0	
2	19 November (DH 1)	Bite	2–0	**L. Wilkins**	S. Chambers	-	2-0	
3	19 November (DH 2)	Bite	3–2	**G. Lim**	M. Williams	-	3-0	
4	20 November	Bite	3-7	J. O’Laughlin	**A. Sookee**	-	3-1	
5	24 November	@ Cavalry	4-8	L. Sosa	**T. Foss**	-	3-2	
6	25 November	@ Cavalry	10-0	**C. Anderson**	H. Beard	-	4-2	
7	26 November	@ Cavalry	1-4	J. DeGraaf	**L. Wilkins**	S. Kent	4-3	
8	27 November	@ Cavalry	11–21	J. Lowery	**S. Schueller**	-	4-4	

December

#	Date	Opponent	Score	Win	Loss	Save	Record	Ref
9	2 December	Heat	6-4	**T. Foss**	M. Lee	**S. Schueller**	5-4	
10	3 December	Heat (DH 1)	2-1	**G. Lim**	W. Dennis	-	6-4	
11	3 December	Heat (DH 2)	2-1	**C. Anderson**	T. Bailey	**J. Guyer**	7-4	
12	4 December	Heat	1-5	D. Schmidt	**A. Sookee**	-	7-5	
13	9 December	Bandits	0-2	J. Erasmus	**T. Foss**	R. Searle	7-6	
14	10 December (DH 1)	Bandits	6-2	**L. Wilkins**	R. Teasley	-	8-6	
15	10 December (DH 2)	Bandits	9-8	**J. Guyer**	R. Niit	-	9-6	
16	11 December	Bandits	1-5	K. Champlin	**C. Oxspring**	R. Searle	9-7	
17	16 December	@ Aces	4-5	J. Tols	**S. Schueller**	-	9-8	
18	17 December	@ Aces	6–7	K. Honda	**L. Wilkins**	-	9-9	
19	17 December	@ Aces	0-5	D. Ruzic	**C. Anderson**	-	9-10	
20	18 December	@ Aces	0-5	J. Kennedy	**C. Oxspring**	-	9-11	
21	29 December	Aces	3-4	M. Hamburger	**J. Guyer**	P. Moylan	9-12	
22	30 December	Aces	9-2	**C. Anderson**	J. Guthrie	-	10-12	
23	31 December	Aces	4-6	P. Moylan	**S. Schueller**	-	10-13	

January

#	Date	Opponent	Score	Win	Loss	Save	Record	Ref
24	1 January	Aces	1-4	J. Kennedy	**Y. Katayama**	V. Vasquez	10-14	
25	5 January	@ Heat	3-0	**T. Foss**	C. Lourey	**T. Van Steensel**	11-14	
26	1 January	@ Heat	7-8	B. Grice	**T. Van Steensel**	-	11-15	
27	7 January	@ Heat	8-10	M. Lee	**T. Grattan**	W. Saupold	11-16	
28	8 January	@ Heat	6-7	J. Bowey	**A. Sookee**	-	11-17	
29	12 January	@ Bandits	4-9	K. Champlin	**T. Foss**	-	11-18	
30	13 January	@ Bandits	10-9	**J. Guyer**	Z. Treece	**T. Van Steensel**	12-18	
31	14 January	@ Bandits	6-7	S. Holland	**L. Wilkins**	R. Searle	12-19	
32	4 January	@ Bandits	PPD–RAIN	-	-	-	-	
33	20 January	Cavalry	3-5	T. Atherton	**G. Lim**	-	12-20	
34	21 January (DH 1)	Cavalry	5-1	**L. Wilkins**	S. Guinard	-	13-20	
35	21 January (DH 2)	Cavalry	1-2	L. Cohen	**C. Anderson**	S. Kent	13-21	
36	22 January	Cavalry	7-6	**Y. Katayama**	S. Kent	-	14-21	
37	26 January	@ Bite	5-4	**V. Harris**	J. O’Loughlin	**T. Van Steensel**	15-21	
38	27 January	@ Bite	2-5	S. Callegari	**C. Anderson**	H. Lee	15-22	
39	28 January	@ Bite	3-15	D. Barker	**L. Wilkins**	-	15-23	
40	29 January	@ Bite	3-4	K. Hampton	**Y. Katayama**	H. Lee	15-24	
41	30 January	@ Bandits (makeup)	CANCELLED	-	-	-	-	

== Roster ==
Sydney Blue Sox roster – 2016–17 ABL
Active roster		Coaching staff
Pitchers Right-handed pitchers: 35 (United States) Trevor Foss; 32 (Australia) Todd Grattan; 17 (Australia) Josh Guyer; 13 (Australia) Vaughn Harris; 16 (Japan) Yuki Katayama; 1 (South Korea) Gyoung-Wan Lim; 9 (Australia) Chris Oxspring; 49 (Germany) Sven Schueller; 4 (Australia) Aaron Sookee; 21 (Australia) Todd Van Steensel; 26 (Australia) Luke Wilkins; Left-handed pitchers: 31 (Australia) Craig Anderson; 53 (Australia) Alex Osborne; 18 (Australia) Matthew Rae; — (Japan) Ryoto Yoshikoshi	Catchers: 29 (Australia) Guy Edmonds; 10 (Australia) Jake Webster; — (Australia) Hiroki Yamazaki; Infielders: 54 (Australia) Jake Amos; 11 (Australia) Trent D’Antonio; 14 (Australia) Joshua Dean; 43 (Australia) Harry Fullerton; 50 (Australia) Shane Kelleher; 25 (United States) Tucker Neuhaus; 37 (Japan) Ryo Nishimura; 24 (Australia) Zac Shepherd; 34 (Australia) Jacob Younis; Outfielders: 45 (United States) Michael Campbell; 27 (Canada) Malik Collymore; 33 (United States) Stone Garrett; 12 (Australia) Alex Howe; 20 (Australia) Joshua Strong	Manager: Jason Pospishil; Coaches: Nathan Wright (Third Base Coach & Hitting Coach); Dae-Sung Koo (Pitching Coach); Grahame Cassel (Bull Pen Coach); Jason Dormor (First Base Coach & Outfield Coordinator); Mark Shipley (Infield Coordinator); : 7-day disabled list : reassigned
7 September 2017.
