= 2014–15 Sydney Blue Sox season =

2014–15 Sydney Blue Sox
- League: Australian Baseball League
- Ballpark: Blacktown International Sportspark Sydney
- City: Blacktown, New South Wales
- Record: 22–24 (.478)
- Place: 3rd
- Owner: ABL
- Manager: Jason Pospishil
- Radio: Triple H FM

The 2014–15 Sydney Blue Sox season was the team's fifth season. The Blue Sox competed in the Australian Baseball League (ABL) against five other teams, playing its home games at Blacktown International Sportspark Sydney.

== Regular season ==
=== Standings ===
Team	Pld	W	L	GB	PCT	Home	Away	Qualification
Adelaide Bite	48	32	16	—	.667	18–6	14–10	Championship Series
Perth Heat	48	28	20	4	.583	15–9	13–11	**Preliminary final**
Sydney Blue Sox	**46**	**22**	**24**	**9**	.478	**12–10**	**10–14**	**Preliminary final**
Canberra Cavalry	46	22	24	9	.478	10–12	12–12	
Brisbane Bandits	46	21	25	10	.457	14–10	7–15	
Melbourne Aces	46	15	31	16	.326	10–14	5–17	

==== Record vs opponents ====
Opponent	W–L Record	Largest Victory			Largest Defeat			Current Streak
Opponent	W–L Record	Score	Date	Ground	Score	Date	Ground	Current Streak
Adelaide Bite	2-12	6-5	14 December 2014	Diamond Sports Stadium	3-15	28 January 2017	Diamond Sports Stadium	L3
		7-6	2 January 2015	Diamond Sports Stadium				
Brisbane Bandits	5-3	7-2	17 January 2015	Brisbane Exhibition Ground	2-6	26 December 2014	Blue Sox Stadium	L1
					5-9	18 January 2015	Brisbane Exhibition Ground	
Canberra Cavalry	7-5	9-0	6 November 2014	Narrabundah Ballpark	1-8	15 November 2014	Blue Sox Stadium	L1
Melbourne Aces	4-2	16-4	8 January 2015	Blue Sox Stadium	4-10	23 November 2014	Melbourne Ballpark	W2
Perth Heat	4-4	7-1	29 November 2014	Baseball Park	9-20	2 November 2014	Baseball Park	L2
Total	22-24	Melbourne Aces			Perth Heat			L1
Total	22-24	16–4	8 January 2015	Blue Sox Stadium	9-20	2 November 2014	Baseball Park	L1

=== Game log ===
W	Blue Sox win
L	Blue Sox loss
T	Blue Sox tie
	Game postponed
	Game cancelled
**Bold**	Blue Sox team member

2014–15 Game Log
October

#	Date	Opponent	Score	Win	Loss	Save	Record	Ref
1	31 October	@ Heat	9-4	**C. Anderson**	S. Sanford	-	1-0	

November

#	Date	Opponent	Score	Win	Loss	Save	Record	Ref
2	1 November (DH 1)	@ Heat	7-3	**M. Solbach**	C. Lamb	-	2-0	
3	1 November (DH 2)	@ Heat	0-5	S. Mitchinson	**L. Wilkins**	-	2-1	
4	2 November	@ Heat	9-20	A. Burkard	**A. Sookee**	-	2-2	
5	6 November	@ Cavalry	9-0	**M. Solbach**	B. Grening	-	3-2	
6	7 November	@ Cavalry	2-4	T. Atherton	**C. Anderson**	D. Crenshaw	3-3	
7	8 November	@ Cavalry	3-1	**L. Wilkins**	T. Crawford	**D. Koo**	4-3	
8	9 November	@ Cavalry	7-5	**T. Cox**	G. Hernandez	**M. Solbach**	5-3	
9	13 November	Cavalry	2-0	**C. Anderson**	B. Grening	-	6-3	
10	14 November	Cavalry	7-6	**W. Lundgren**	D. Crenshaw	-	7-3	
11	15 November	Cavalry	1-8	T. Atherton	**L. Wilkins**	J. Brown	7-4	
12	16 November	Cavalry	6-11	W. Ough	**V. Harris**	-	7-5	
13	20 November	@ Aces	5-3	**M. Solbach**	N. Blount	**D. Koo**	8-5	
14	21 November	@ Aces	2-4	C. Buckel	**C. Anderson**	K. Miyata	8-6	
15	22 November	@ Aces	12-8	**A. Sookee**	J. Kennedy	-	9-6	
16	23 November	@ Aces	4-10	K. Miyata	**V Harris**	-	9-7	
17	27 November	Heat	9-5	**M. Solbach**	B. Baker	-	10-7	
18	28 November	Heat	2-6	D. Schmidt	**C. Anderson**	J. Marban	10-8	
19	29 November	Heat	7-1	**L. Wilkins**	S. Sanford	-	11-8	
20	30 November	Heat	0-2	B. Shorto	**L. Wells**	M. Acker	11-9	

December

#	Date	Opponent	Score	Win	Loss	Save	Record	Ref
21	11 December	Bite	PPD - RAIN	-	-	-	-	
22	12 December	Bite	4-5	J. Tols	**A. Sookee**	T. Brunnemann	11-10	
23	13 December (DH 1)	Bite	0-3	W. Lee	**C. Anderson**	W. Mathis	11-11	
24	13 December (DH 2)	Bite	0-6	M. Coombs	**L. Wilkins**	-	11-12	
25	14 December	Bite	6-5	**J. Guyer**	J. Tols	-	12-12	
26	18 December	@ Bite	3-10	W. Mathis	**V. Harris**	-	12-13	
27	19 December	@ Bite	2-6	J. Tols	**M. Solbach**	-	12-14	
28	20 December	@ Bite	2-4	M. Coombs	**C. Anderson**	T. Brunnemann	12-15	
29	21 December	@ Bite	3-4	J. Tols	**S. Landell**	-	12-16	
30	26 December	Bandits	2-6	M. Takashio	**M. Solbach**	-	12-17	
31	27 December	Bandits	2-1	**C. Anderson**	C. Lin	**D. Koo**	13-17	
32	28 December	Bandits	6-4	**L. Wilkins**	R. Searle	**T. Van Steensel**	14-17	
33	29 December	Bandits	10-9	**W. Lundgren**	D. Cooper	-	15-17	

January

#	Date	Opponent	Score	Win	Loss	Save	Record	Ref
34	2 January	@ Bite	7-6	**A. Sookee**	T. Brunnemann	**T. Van Steensel**	16-17	
35	3 January (DH 1)	@ Bite	7-11	C. Stem	**C. Anderson**	-	16-18	
36	3 January (DH 2)	@ Bite	7-9	T. Brunnemann	**D. Koo**	-	16-19	
37	4 January	@ Bite	5-13	D. Fidge	**S. Landell**	-	16-20	
38	8 January	Aces	16-4	**M. Solbach**	M. Wilson	-	17-20	
39	9 January	Aces	7-0	**C. Anderson**	T. Brown	-	18-20	
40	10 January (DH 1)	Aces	PPD - RAIN	-	-	-	-	
41	10 January (DH 2)	Aces	PPD - RAIN	-	-	-	-	
42	15 January	@ Bandits	5-8	R. Searle	**M. Solbach**	M. Timms	18-21	
43	16 January	@ Bandits	4-3	**C. Anderson**	C. Lin	**A. Sookee**	19-21	
44	17 January	@ Bandits	7-2	**L. Wilkins**	D. Naylor	-	20-21	
45	18 January	@ Bandits	5-9	M. Takashio	**J. Shergill**	-	20-22	
46	22 January	Cavalry	2-3	B. Grening	A. Sookee	D. Crenshaw	20-23	
47	23 January	Cavalry	8-6	**L. Wilkins**	T. Atherton	**D. Koo**	21-23	
48	24 January	Cavalry	2-1	**M. Solbach**	G. Hernandez	**A. Sookee**	22-23	
49	25 January	Cavalry	2-7	T. Crawford	**J. Shergill**	-	22-24	

== Postseason ==
Three teams in the ABL qualified for a two-round postseason. The highest placed team at the end of the 2014-15 regular season, the Adelaide Bite gained entry to and hosted the Championship Series. The second and third place teams at the end of the 2014-15 regular season, the Perth Heat and the Sydney Blue Sox, respectively, played a Preliminary Final Series to determine the Adelaide Bite's opponent in the Championship Series. The Blue Sox fell to the Heat 0-2 in the Preliminary Final Series, thus ending the Blue Sox's postseason run and advancing the Heat to the Championship Series.

2014–15 Preliminary Final Series Game Log
January

#	Date	Opponent	Score	Win	Loss	Save	Record	Ref
1	30 January	Heat	4-5	M. Acker	A. Sookee	J. Marban	0-1	
2	31 January	@ Heat	2-9	S. Mitchinson	L. Wilkins	-	0-2	

Preliminary Final Series			Championship Series
			1	Adelaide Bite	1
2	Perth Heat	2	2	Perth Heat	2
3	Sydney Blue Sox	0

== Roster ==
Sydney Blue Sox roster – 2014–15 ABL
Active roster		Reserve players	Coaching staff
Pitchers Right-handed pitchers: 32 (Australia) Todd Grattan; 17 (Australia) Josh Guyer; 44 (Australia) Wayne Lundgren; 66 (Canada) Jaspreet Shergill; 33 (Germany) Markus Solbach; 4 (Australia) Aaron Sookee; 21 (Australia) Todd Van Steensel; 26 (Australia) Luke Wilkins; Left-handed pitchers: 31 (Australia) Craig Anderson; 30 (South Korea) Dae-Sung Koo	Catchers: 35 (United States) Tyler Baker; Infielders: 9 (United States) Tyler Bortnick; 11 (Australia) Trent D’Antonio; 14 (Australia) Joshua Dean; 38 (United States) Ray Frias; 16 (Australia) Michael Lysaught; 28 (United States) Wes Patterson; 24 (Australia) Zac Shepherd; 34 (Australia) Jacob Younis; Outfielders: 5 (United States) Alex Glenn; 12 (Australia) Alex Howe; 25 (Australia) David Kandilas; 10 (Australia) Trent Oeltjen	Pitchers: 8 (Australia) Timothy Cox; 13 (Australia) Vaughan Harris; 2 (Australia) Matthew Rae; 29 (Australia) Lachlan Wells; Catchers: 39 (Australia) Guy Edmonds; 49 (Australia) James Philibossian; 23 (United States) Will Swanner; Infielders: — (Australia) Michael Vine; Outfielders: 22 (Australia) Joshua Strong	Manager: Jason Pospishil; Coaches: Darian Lindsay (Pitching Coach); Nathan Wright (Coach); Grahame Cassel (Bench Coach); : 7-day disabled list : reassigned
4 September 2017
