= 2015–16 Sydney Blue Sox season =

2015–16 Sydney Blue Sox
- League: Australian Baseball League
- Ballpark: Blacktown International Sportspark Sydney
- City: Blacktown, New South Wales
- Record: 26–29 (.473)
- Place: 4th
- Owner: ABL
- Manager: Jason Pospishil
- Radio: Triple H FM

The 2015–16 Sydney Blue Sox season was the team's sixth season. The Blue Sox competed in the Australian Baseball League (ABL) with five other teams, playing its home games at Blacktown International Sportspark Sydney.

== Regular season ==
=== Standings ===
Team	Pld	W	L	GB	PCT	Home	Away	Qualification
Brisbane Bandits	56	37	19	—	.661	23–5	14–14	Championship Series
Canberra Cavalry	56	31	25	6	.554	18–10	13–15	Preliminary final
Adelaide Bite	56	30	26	7	.536	18–10	12–16	Preliminary final
Sydney Blue Sox	**55**	**26**	**29**	**10.5**	.473	**18–9**	**8–20**	
Perth Heat	56	23	33	14	.411	12–16	11–17	
Melbourne Aces	55	20	35	16.5	.364	10–18	10–17	

==== Record vs opponents ====
Opponent	W–L Record	Largest Victory			Largest Defeat			Current Streak
Opponent	W–L Record	Score	Date	Ground	Score	Date	Ground	Current Streak
Adelaide Bite	4-8	9-2	2 January 2016	Blue Sox Stadium	1-7	1 January 2016	Blue Sox Stadium	W3
		7-0	3 January 2016	Blue Sox Stadium				
Brisbane Bandits	5-7	5-1	26 November 2015	Blue Sox Stadium	2-10	27 December 2015	Brisbane Exhibition Ground	L3
		5-1	28 November 2015	Blue Sox Stadium				
		6-2	29 November 2015	Blue Sox Stadium				
Canberra Cavalry	6-5	8-0	11 December 2015	Blue Sox Stadium	3-14	7 November 2015	Narrabundah Ballpark	L1
Melbourne Aces	7-4	5-0	19 December 2015	Blue Sox Stadium	3-7	19 December 2015	Blue Sox Stadium	W2
Perth Heat	4-4	6-1	31 October 2015	Blue Sox Stadium	5-10	22 November 2015	Baseball Park	L1
Total	26-29	Canberra Cavalry			Canberra Cavalry			W2
Total	26-29	8–0	11 December 2015	Blue Sox Stadium	3–14	7 November 2015	Narrabundah Ballpark	W2

=== Game log ===
W	Blue Sox win
L	Blue Sox loss
T	Blue Sox tie
	Game postponed
	Game cancelled
**Bold**	Blue Sox team member

2015–16 Game Log
October

#	Date	Opponent	Score	Win	Loss	Save	Record	Ref
1	23 October	@ Aces (DH 1)	0-3	M. Larkins	**W. Lundgren**	W. Wu	0-1	Archived 5 September 2017 at the Wayback Machine
2	24 October	@ Aces (DH 1)	7-3	**B. Zywicki**	J. Kennedy	-	1-1	Archived 5 September 2017 at the Wayback Machine
3	24 October	@ Aces (DH 2)	2-4	Y. Sano	**C. Letourneau**	T. Yamaguchi	1-2	Archived 5 September 2017 at the Wayback Machine
4	25 October	@ Aces	6-4	**T. Grattan**	M. Wilson	-	2-2	Archived 5 September 2017 at the Wayback Machine
5	30 October	Heat	1-4	D. Schmidt	**W. Lundgren**	M. Taylor	2-3	Archived 5 September 2017 at the Wayback Machine
6	31 October	Heat (DH 1)	6-1	**A. Balog**	J. Jones	-	3-3	Archived 5 September 2017 at the Wayback Machine
7	31 October	Heat (DH 2)	3-2	**C. Drummond**	S. Mitchinson	-	4-3	Archived 5 September 2017 at the Wayback Machine

November

#	Date	Opponent	Score	Win	Loss	Save	Record	Ref
8	1 November	Heat	3-5	E. Valle	**G. Lim**	-	4-4	Archived 6 September 2017 at the Wayback Machine
9	5 November	@ Cavalry	PPD - RAIN	-	-	-	-	Archived 5 September 2017 at the Wayback Machine
10	6 November	@ Cavalry	0-9	B. Grening	**W. Lundgren**	-	4-5	Archived 5 September 2017 at the Wayback Machine
11	7 November	@ Cavalry (DH 1)	6-0	**A. Balog**	W. Korpi	-	5-5	Archived 5 September 2017 at the Wayback Machine
12	7 November	@ Cavalry (DH 2)	3-14	S. Kent	**C. Anderson**	-	5-6	Archived 5 September 2017 at the Wayback Machine
13	8 November	@ Cavalry	11-10	M. Click	**C. Drummond**	-	5-7	Archived 5 September 2017 at the Wayback Machine
14	12 November	Bite	PPD - RAIN	-	-	-	-	Archived 5 September 2017 at the Wayback Machine
15	13 November	Bite	PPD - RAIN	-	-	-	-	Archived 5 September 2017 at the Wayback Machine
16	14 November	Bite (DH 1)	PPD - RAIN	-	-	-	-	Archived 5 September 2017 at the Wayback Machine
17	14 November	Bite (DH 2)	PPD - RAIN	-	-	-	-	Archived 5 September 2017 at the Wayback Machine
18	15 November	Bite (DH 1)	3-6	S. Chambers	**A. Balog**	K. Kerski	5-8	Archived 5 September 2017 at the Wayback Machine
19	15 November	Bite (DH 2)	0-4	N. Talbot	**W. Lundgren**	-	5-9	Archived 5 September 2017 at the Wayback Machine
20	20 November	@ Heat	7-4	**A. Balog**	D. Schmidt	**C. Drummond**	6-9	Archived 5 September 2017 at the Wayback Machine
21	21 November	@ Heat (DH 1)	1-2	T. Bailey	**M. Rae**	-	6-10	Archived 5 September 2017 at the Wayback Machine
22	21 November	@ Heat (DH 2)	5-4	**C. Anderson**	J. Jones	**C. Drummond**	7-10	Archived 5 September 2017 at the Wayback Machine
23	22 November	@ Heat	5-10	N. Veale	**J. Stoecklin**	-	7-11	Archived 5 September 2017 at the Wayback Machine
24	26 November	Bandits	5-1	**A. Balog**	R. Teasley	-	8-11	Archived 5 September 2017 at the Wayback Machine
25	27 November	Bandits	8-5	**W. Lundgren**	J. Jarvis	**C. Drummond**	9-11	Archived 5 September 2017 at the Wayback Machine
26	28 November	Bandits	5-1	**C. Anderson**	T. Baker	**L. Wilkins**	10-11	Archived 5 September 2017 at the Wayback Machine
27	29 November	Bandits	6-2	**J. Stoecklin**	J. Erasmus	-	11-11	Archived 5 September 2017 at the Wayback Machine

December

#	Date	Opponent	Score	Win	Loss	Save	Record	Ref
28	3 December	@ Bite	0-4	S. Chambers	**A. Balog**	-	11-12	Archived 5 September 2017 at the Wayback Machine
29	4 December	@ Bite	3-6	H. Lee	**M. Rae**	L. Van Mil	11-13	Archived 5 September 2017 at the Wayback Machine
30	5 December	@ Bite (DH 1)	3-4	J. Tols	**L. Wilkins**	K. Kerski	11-14	Archived 5 September 2017 at the Wayback Machine
31	5 December	@ Bite (DH 2)	11-13	C. Dula	**G. Lim**	L. Van Mil	11-15	Archived 5 September 2017 at the Wayback Machine
32	6 December	@ Bite	14-9	**J. Stoecklin**	W. Lee	-	12-15	Archived 5 September 2017 at the Wayback Machine
33	11 December	Cavalry	8-0	**A. Balog**	B. Grening	-	13-15	Archived 5 September 2017 at the Wayback Machine
34	12 December	Cavalry	11-7	**L. Wilkins**	W. Korpi	-	14-15	Archived 5 September 2017 at the Wayback Machine
35	13 December	Cavalry	6-1	**C. Anderson**	S. Kent	-	15-15	Archived 5 September 2017 at the Wayback Machine
36	14 December	Cavalry	8-2	**J. Stoecklin**	S. Cone	-	16-15	Archived 5 September 2017 at the Wayback Machine
37	18 December	Aces	5-3	**M. Rae**	J. Kennedy	**C. Drummond**	17-15	Archived 6 September 2017 at the Wayback Machine
38	19 December	Aces (DH 1)	5-0	**C. Anderson**	Y. Sano	-	18-15	Archived 5 September 2017 at the Wayback Machine
39	19 December	Aces (DH 2)	3-7	M. Larkins	**J. Stoecklin**	-	18-16	Archived 5 September 2017 at the Wayback Machine
40	20 December	Aces	5-3	**W. Lundgren**	M. McGillivray	**C. Drummond**	19-16	Archived 5 September 2017 at the Wayback Machine
41	26 December	@ Bandits	5-7	J. Jarvis	**C. Anderson**	R. Searle	19-17	Archived 5 September 2017 at the Wayback Machine
42	27 December	@ Bandits	2-10	J. Erasmus	**W. Lundgren**			Archived 5 September 2017 at the Wayback Machine
43	28 December	@ Bandits	0-3	R. Teasley	**L. Wells**	R. Searle	19-19	Archived 5 September 2017 at the Wayback Machine
44	29 December	@ Bandits	9-11	T. Stanton	**A. Sookee**	R. Searle	19-20	Archived 5 September 2017 at the Wayback Machine
45	31 December	Bite	3-8	S. Chambers	**M. Rae**	-	19-21	Archived 5 September 2017 at the Wayback Machine

January

#	Date	Opponent	Score	Win	Loss	Save	Record	Ref
46	1 January	Bite	1-7	J. Tols	**C. Anderson**	-	19-22	Archived 5 September 2017 at the Wayback Machine
47	2 January	Bite (DH 1)	7-6	**A. Sookee**	L. Van Mil	**T. Van Steensel**	20-22	Archived 6 September 2017 at the Wayback Machine
48	2 January	Bite (DH 2)	9-2	**W. Lundgren**	D. Gallant	-	21-22	Archived 6 September 2017 at the Wayback Machine
49	3 January	Bite	7-0	**J. Stoecklin**	M. Williams	-	22-22	Archived 5 September 2017 at the Wayback Machine
50	7 January	@ Bandits	6-3	**C. Anderson**	R. Niit	**T. Van Steensel**	23-22	Archived 5 September 2017 at the Wayback Machine
51	8 January	@ Bandits	8-13	J. Jarvis	**W. Lundgren**	-	23-23	Archived 5 September 2017 at the Wayback Machine
52	9 January	@ Bandits	7-8	R. Searle	**A. Sookee**	-	23-24	Archived 5 September 2017 at the Wayback Machine
53	10 January	@ Bandits	4-10	J. Erasmus	**J. Stoecklin**	T. Stanton	23-25	Archived 5 September 2017 at the Wayback Machine
54	14 January	@ Cavalry	PPD - RAIN	-	-	-	-	Archived 5 September 2017 at the Wayback Machine
55	15 January	@ Cavalry	2-3	B. Grening	**B. Zywicki**	M. Click	23-26	Archived 5 September 2017 at the Wayback Machine
56	16 January	@ Cavalry (DH 1)	2-0	**L. Wells**	S. Kent	**T. Van Steensel**	24-26	Archived 5 September 2017 at the Wayback Machine
57	16 January	@ Cavalry (DH 2)	4-7	L. Cohen	**W. Lundgren**	M. Click	24-27	Archived 5 September 2017 at the Wayback Machine
58	17 January	@ Cavalry	0-5	S. Cone	**J. Stoecklin**	-	24-28	Archived 5 September 2017 at the Wayback Machine
59	21 January	Aces	PPD - RAIN	-	-	-	-	Archived 5 September 2017 at the Wayback Machine
60	22 January	Aces	PPD - RAIN	-	-	-	-	Archived 5 September 2017 at the Wayback Machine
61	23 January	Aces (DH 1)	3-6	S. Street	**C. Anderson**	-	24-29	Archived 5 September 2017 at the Wayback Machine
62	23 January	Aces (DH 2)	4-2	**V. Harris**	M. Larkins	**T. Van Steensel**	25-29	Archived 5 September 2017 at the Wayback Machine
63	24 January	Aces	10-8	**A. Sookee**	T. Marks	**T. Van Steensel**	26-29	Archived 5 September 2017 at the Wayback Machine

== Roster ==
Sydney Blue Sox roster – 2014–15 ABL
Active roster		Reserve players	Coaching staff
Pitchers Right-handed pitchers: 13 (Australia) Vaughan Harris; 1 (South Korea) Gyoung-Wan Lim; 44 (Australia) Wayne Lundgren; 5 (Australia) Adam O'Neill; 4 (Australia) Aaron Sookee; 41 (Germany) Jan-Niclas Stoecklin; 49 (Japan) Keiji Uezono; 21 (Australia) Todd Van Steensel; 47 (United States) Brandon Zywicki; Left-handed pitchers: 31 (Australia) Craig Anderson; 16 (Australia) Grant Piccoli; 18 (Australia) Matthew Rae; 29 (Australia) Lachlan Wells	Catchers: 50 (United States) Michael Quesada; 10 (Australia) Jake Webster; Infielders: 8 (United States) Tyler Bortnick; 28 (Australia) Max Brennen; 11 (Australia) Trent D’Antonio; 14 (Australia) Joshua Dean; 38 (United States) Rhys Hoskins; 34 (Australia) Jacob Younis; Outfielders: 45 (United States) Grant Heyman; 12 (Australia) Alex Howe; 25 (Australia) David Kandilas; 3 (Australia) Matthew Smith; 22 (Australia) Joshua Strong	Pitchers: 35 (United States) Alex Balog; 22 (United States) Calvin Drummond; 32 (Australia) Todd Grattan; 46 (Australia) Charles Letourneau; 26 (Australia) Luke Wilkins; Catchers: 39 (Australia) Guy Edmonds; 49 (Australia) James Philibossian; 23 (United States) Will Swanner; Infielders: 51 (Australia) Brad Callaghan; 23 (Australia) Jamie Westbrook; 38 (United States) James Yates; Outfielders: — (United States) Chuck Taylor	Manager: Jason Pospishil; Coaches: Nathan Wright (Coach); Jim Colborn (Pitching Coach); : 7-day disabled list : reassigned
5 September 2017
