= 2014–15 Australian Baseball League season =

Fifth Australian Baseball League (ABL) season

- League: Australian Baseball League
- Sport: Baseball
- Duration: 30 October 2014 – 8 February 2015
- Games: 138
- Teams: 6
- Total attendance: 140,932

Regular season
- Season MVP: Aaron Miller

Championship Series
- Venue: Norwood Oval
- Champions: Perth Heat (4th title)
- Runners-up: Adelaide Bite

Seasons
- ← 2013–14 2015–16 →

The 2014–15 Australian Baseball League season was the fifth Australian Baseball League (ABL) season. It was held from 30 October 2014 to 8 February 2015, with the Perth Heat winning their fourth title in five seasons, defeating the Adelaide Bite in the finals to defend their title.

== Teams ==

Teams in the ABL
Team	City	State	Stadium	Ref
Adelaide Bite	Adelaide	South Australia	Norwood Oval	
Brisbane Bandits	Brisbane	Queensland	Brisbane Exhibition Ground	
Canberra Cavalry	Canberra	Australian Capital Territory	Narrabundah Ballpark	
Melbourne Aces	Melbourne	Victoria	Melbourne Ballpark	
Perth Heat	Perth	Western Australia	Baseball Park	
Sydney Blue Sox	Sydney	New South Wales	Blue Sox Stadium	

== Regular season ==
=== Standings ===
Team	Pld	W	L	GB	PCT	Home	Away	Qualification
Adelaide Bite	48	32	16	—	.667	18–6	14–10	Championship Series
Perth Heat	48	28	20	4	.583	15–9	13–11	Preliminary final
Sydney Blue Sox	46	22	24	9	.478	12–10	10–14	Preliminary final
Canberra Cavalry	46	22	24	9	.478	10–12	12–12	
Brisbane Bandits	46	21	25	10	.457	14–10	7–15	
Melbourne Aces	46	15	31	16	.326	10–14	5–17	

=== Statistical leaders ===
Batting leaders
Stat	Player (Note: Minimum 2.7 PAs per team game.)	Team	Total
AVG	Aaron Miller	Adelaide Bite	.389
HR	Kellin Deglan	Melbourne Aces	16
RBI	Jack Murphy	Canberra Cavalry	37
R	Brandon Dixon Joey Wong	Adelaide Bite Perth Heat	38
H	Thomas Coyle	Brisbane Bandits	60
SB	Brandon Dixon	Adelaide Bite	21

Pitching leaders
Stat	Player (Note: Minimum 0.8 IP per team game.)	Team	Total
W	Josh Tols	Adelaide Bite	9
L	Tim Brown	Melbourne Aces	7
ERA	Mike McClendon	Perth Heat	1.66
K	Ryan Searle	Brisbane Bandits	69
IP	Craig Anderson	Sydney Blue Sox	77 2/3
SV	Jorge Marban Tyler Brunnemann Dustin Crenshaw	Perth Heat Adelaide Bite Canberra Cavalry	8

== Postseason ==
=== Bracket ===
Preliminary Final Series			Championship Series
			1	Adelaide Bite	1
2	Perth Heat	2	2	Perth Heat	2
3	Sydney Blue Sox	0

=== Preliminary Final Series ===
==== Game 1 ====
January 30, 2015 19:30 (UTC+11:00) at Blue Sox Stadium
Team	1	2	3	4	5	6	7	8	9	R	H	E
Perth Heat	0	0	2	1	0	0	0	2	0	5	9	0
Sydney Blue Sox	0	0	0	0	0	4	0	0	0	4	10	1
WP: McKenzie Acker (1–0) LP: Aaron Sookee (0–1) Sv: Jorge Marban (1); Home runs: PER: Rene Tosoni (1); SYD: None; Umpires: HP: Trent Thomas 1B: Riley Barrington 2B: Jordan Taylor 3B: Bob Crawford; Boxscore

==== Game 2 ====
January 31, 2015 19:20 (UTC+08:00) at Baseball Park
Team	1	2	3	4	5	6	7	8	9	R	H	E
Sydney Blue Sox	0	0	0	0	0	2	0	0	0	2	10	4
Perth Heat	1	0	3	2	1	0	0	2	X	9	13	0
WP: Scott Mitchinson (1–0) LP: Luke Wilkins (0–1); Umpires: HP: Brett Robson 1B: Ryan Harder 2B: Lou Bonomi 3B: Peter Bowie; Boxscore

==== Composite line score ====
2015 ABL Preliminary Final Series (2–0): Perth Heat over Sydney Blue Sox

Team	1	2	3	4	5	6	7	8	9	R	H	E
Perth Heat	1	0	5	3	1	0	0	4	0	14	23	0
Sydney Blue Sox	0	0	0	0	0	6	0	0	0	6	20	5

=== Championship Series ===
==== Game 1 ====
February 6, 2015 19:00 (UTC+10:30) at Norwood Oval
Team	1	2	3	4	5	6	7	8	9	R	H	E
Perth Heat	1	0	0	1	0	0	0	0	0	2	6	2
Adelaide Bite	0	0	0	0	0	0	3	0	X	3	7	1
WP: Morgan Coombs (1–0) LP: Mike McClendon (0–1) Sv: Tyler Brunnemann (1); Home runs: PER: Tim Smith (1); ADE: Stefan Welch (1), Tom Brice (1), Mitch Dening (1); Umpires: HP: Brett Robson 1B: Paul Latta 2B: Neil Poulton 3B: Trent Thomas; Boxscore

==== Game 2 ====
February 7, 2015 19:00 (UTC+10:30) at Norwood Oval (F/10)
Team	1	2	3	4	5	6	7	8	9	10	R	H	E
Perth Heat	0	0	2	0	0	0	1	0	0	2	5	6	0
Adelaide Bite	1	0	0	0	0	0	2	0	0	0	3	9	0
WP: Jorge Marban (1–0) LP: Tyler Brunnemann (0–1); Home runs: PER: Tim Kennelly (1), Brian Pointer (1); ADE: Stefan Welch (2), Chris Adamson (1); Umpires: HP: Neil Poulton 1B: Brett Robson 2B: Trent Thomas 3B: Paul Latta; Boxscore

==== Game 3 ====
February 8, 2015 19:00 (UTC+10:30) at Norwood Oval
Team	1	2	3	4	5	6	7	8	9	R	H	E
Perth Heat	2	4	0	3	0	0	3	0	0	12	13	0
Adelaide Bite	0	1	0	3	0	0	0	1	0	5	12	1
WP: Mike McCarthy (1–0) LP: Wilson Lee (0–1); Home runs: PER: Tim Kennelly (1), Tim Smith (2), Luke Hughes (1); ADE: Mitch Dening 2 (3), Craig Maddox (1); Umpires: HP: Paul Latta 1B: Trent Thomas 2B: Brett Robson 3B: Neil Poulton; Boxscore

==== Composite line score ====
2015 ABL Championship Series (2–1): Adelaide Bite over Perth Heat

Team	1	2	3	4	5	6	7	8	9	10	R	H	E
Perth Heat	3	4	2	4	0	0	4	0	0	2	19	25	2
Adelaide Bite	1	1	0	3	0	0	5	1	0	0	11	28	2
