= 2017–18 Sydney Blue Sox season =

2017–18 Sydney Blue Sox
- League: Australian Baseball League
- Ballpark: Blacktown International Sportspark Sydney
- City: Blacktown, New South Wales
- Record: 13–27 (.325)
- Place: 5th
- Owner: ABL
- Manager: Tony Harris
- Radio: Triple H FM

The 2017–18 Sydney Blue Sox season will be the team's seventh season. The Blue Sox will compete in the Australian Baseball League (ABL) with five other teams, playing its home games at Blacktown International Sportspark Sydney.

== Regular season ==
=== Standings ===
2017–18 regular season standings
Pos	Team	W	L	Pct.	GB	Home	Away
1	Brisbane Bandits	28	11	.718	–	15–4	13–7
2	Perth Heat	26	14	.650	2.5	12–8	14–6
3	Canberra Cavalry	21	18	.538	4.0	14–6	10–9
4	Melbourne Aces	17	23	.425	11.5	9–11	8–12
5	Sydney Blue Sox	13	27	.325	15.5	7–13	6–14
6	Adelaide Bite	11	29	.275	17.5	7–13	4–16

==== Record vs opponents ====
Opponent	W–L Record	Largest Victory			Largest Defeat			Current Streak
Opponent	W–L Record	Score	Date	Ground	Score	Date	Ground	Current Streak
Adelaide Bite	—							
Brisbane Bandits	—							
Canberra Cavalry	—							
Melbourne Aces	—							
Perth Heat	—							
Total	—	TBD			TBD			

=== Game log ===
W	Blue Sox win
L	Blue Sox loss
T	Blue Sox tie
	Game postponed
	Game cancelled
**Bold**	Blue Sox team member

2017–18 Game Log
November

#	Date	Opponent	Score	Win	Loss	Save	Record	Ref
1	16 November	Bite						
2	17 November	Bite						
3	18 November	Bite						
4	19 November	Bite						
5	23 November	@ Cavalry						
6	24 November	@ Cavalry						
7	25 November	@ Cavalry						
8	26 November	@ Cavalry						
9	30 November	Heat						

December

#	Date	Opponent	Score	Win	Loss	Save	Record	Ref
10	1 December	Heat						
11	2 December	Heat						
12	3 December	Heat						
13	7 December	@ Bandits						
14	8 December	@ Bandits						
15	9 December	@ Bandits						
16	10 December	@ Bandits						
17	14 December	@ Aces						
18	15 December	@ Aces						
19	16 December	@ Aces						
20	17 December	@ Aces						
21	28 December	Aces						
22	29 December	Aces				-		
23	30 December	Aces						
24	31 December	Aces						

January

#	Date	Opponent	Score	Win	Loss	Save	Record	Ref
25	4 January	Bandits						
26	5 January	Bandits						
27	6 January	Bandits						
28	7 January	Bandits						
29	11 January	@ Heat						
30	12 January	@ Heat						
31	13 January	@ Heat						
32	14 January	@ Heat						
33	18 January	Cavalry						
34	19 January	Cavalry						
35	20 January	Cavalry						
36	21 January	Cavalry						
37	25 January	@ Bite						
38	26 January	@ Bite						
39	27 January	@ Bite						

== Roster ==
Sydney Blue Sox roster – 2017–18 ABL
Active roster		Reassigned Players	Coaching staff
Pitchers Right-handed pitchers Left-handed pitchers	Catchers {{{Catchers}}} Infielders {{{Infielders}}} Outfielders	Pitchers	Manager: Tony Harris; Coaches : 7-day disabled list
3 September 2017.
