= Lim Gyoung-wan =

South Korean baseball player

Lotte Giants – No. 91
- Relief pitcher / bullpen coach
- Born: December 28, 1975 (age 50); Busan, South Korea
- Batted: Right Threw: Right

Professional debut
- KBO: April 13, 1998, for the Lotte Giants
- ABL: October 30, 2015, for the Sydney Blue Sox

Last KBO appearance
- April 1, 2015, for the Hanwha Eagles

KBO statistics
- Win–loss record: 30–46
- Saves: 33
- Earned run average: 4.18
- Strikeouts: 406
- Holds: 69

ABL statistics
- Win–loss record: 2–3
- Saves: 0
- Earned run average: 5.22
- Strikeouts: 28
- lim---000gyo Stats at Baseball Reference

Teams
- Lotte Giants (1998–2011); SK Wyverns (2012–2014); Hanwha Eagles (2015); Sydney Blue Sox (2015–2017)

Career highlights and awards
- KBO hold leader (2004)

- Lim Gyoung-wan
- Hangul: 임경완
- Hanja: 林炅玩
- RR: Im Gyeongwan
- MR: Im Kyŏngwan

Lim Gyoung-wan (Korean: 임경완; Hanja: 林炅玩; born December 28, 1975) is a retired South Korean relief pitcher.

== Professional career ==
Upon graduating from Inha University, Lim joined the Lotte Giants in 1998, selected in the first round of the 1998 KBO League draft. As a relief pitcher he garnered attention in 2004 when led the KBO League in holds with 22.

In the 2008 season, Lim became the closer of the Giants. In August 2008, however, Lim lost the closer's role to former Colorado Rockies setup man David Cortés.

After playing two seasons with the Sydney Blue Sox, Lim became a pitching coach with Geelong-Korea.
