= Dean Aldridge =

Australian baseball pitcher

Sydney Blue Sox – No. 55
- Pitcher
- Born: 29 July 1994 (age 30); Sydney
- Bats: Right Throws: Right

Dean Oliver Aldridge (born 29 July 1994) is an Australian professional baseball pitcher for the Sydney Blue Sox and Canberra Cavalry of the Australian Baseball League. He has also played for Team Australia.

== Career ==
He was signed as a non-drafted free agent by the Detroit Tigers on 29 May 2012 and played in the Tigers farm system until he was released following the 2017 season. In March 2018, he was signed as a free agent by the Minnesota Twins, and was assigned to extended spring training before being released at the end of the season.

Aldridge was selected as a member of the Australia national baseball team for the 2019 WBSC Premier12.
