= List of killings by law enforcement officers in the United States, December 2019 =

This is a list of people reported killed by non-military law enforcement officers in the United States in December 2019, whether in the line of duty or not, and regardless of reason or method. The listing documents the occurrence of a death, making no implications regarding wrongdoing or justification on the part of the person killed or officer involved. Killings are arranged by date of the incident that caused death. Different death dates, if known, are noted in the description. The table below lists 111 people.

== December 2019 ==
| Date | Name (age) of deceased | Race | State (city) | Description |
|---|---|---|---|---|
| 2019-12-31 | Malik Williams (23) | Black | Washington (Federal Way) | Officers responded to a noise disturbance and found Williams, who was in a wheelchair, and a female arguing in a car. The female exited the vehicle. Officers spoke with her and Williams. According to police, Williams made a "quick move" in the car, which resulted in gunfire. Two of seven officers on the scene were struck, but survived. Williams was killed. The Valley Independent Investigations Team alleged that Williams had initiated the gun fight. Police recovered a black 9mm handgun from the car. They also recovered eighty-four shell casings from the scene, although it is unclear how many are from police weapons. |
| 2019-12-31 | Eric M. Tellez (28) | White | Arizona (Globe) | |
| 2019-12-31 | Terry Hudson (57) | Black | Nebraska (Omaha) | |
| 2019-12-31 | Michael Vincent Davis (49) | White | West Virginia (Cross Lanes) | |
| 2019-12-31 | Dedrick Thomas | Black | Arkansas (Memphis) | |
| 2019-12-31 | Brian Elkins (47) | Unknown race | Mississippi (Blue Mountain) | |
| 2019-12-31 | Frederick Perkins (37) | Black | Missouri (Chesterfield) | |
| 2019-12-30 | Debra D. Arbuckle (51) | White | Kansas (Wichita) | |
| 2019-12-30 | Davion Edison | Black | Texas (Houston) | |
| 2019-12-30 | Cody McCaulou (27) | White | Missouri (Fulton) | |
| 2019-12-29 | Kelly Michael Stephens (34) | White | Alaska (Juneau) | |
| 2019-12-29 | John Bott (76) | Unknown race | Mississippi (Byhalia) | |
| 2019-12-29 | Manuel Gonzales Verdugo (50) | Hispanic | California (El Centro) | |
| 2019-12-29 | Patrick Alden (29) | White | South Dakota (Rapid City) | |
| 2019-12-28 | Albert Benjamin Simon (52) | White | Texas (Houston) | |
| 2019-12-28 | Troy Kirk (31) | White | Ohio (Lancaster) | |
| 2019-12-28 | Craig Ellis See (34) | White | California (Clearlake Oaks) | |
| 2019-12-28 | A.B. Carr (31) | White | Tennessee (Elizabethton) | |
| 2019-12-28 | Heriberto Rodriguez (27) | Hispanic | California (Bakersfield) | |
| 2019-12-27 | Frederick Jeremy Atkin (42) | White | Utah (South Ogden) | |
| 2019-12-27 | Henry "Hank" Kistler Berry III (43) | White | Virginia (Newport) | |
| 2019-12-27 | John Lowell Dollen | White | Maryland (Linthicum Heights) | |
| 2019-12-27 | Christopher Camacho (16) | Hispanic | Maine (Limerick) | |
| 2019-12-26 | Juan Rosa (35) | Hispanic | Florida (Auburndale) | |
| 2019-12-26 | Antonio Smith (35) | Black | Tennessee (Memphis) | |
| 2019-12-25 | Lori Jean Canada (59) | White | Florida (Ocala) | |
| 2019-12-25 | Deangelo Rashad Martin (23) | Black | Georgia (Atlanta) | |
| 2019-12-24 | Elray Barber (60) | Black | Oklahoma (Oklahoma City) | |
| 2019-12-24 | David A. White (56) | Unknown race | Springfield, MO | |
| 2019-12-24 | Harvey Cantrell (65) | White | Deltona, FL | |
| 2019-12-23 | Austin Chase Swindle (24) | White | Bryant, AR | |
| 2019-12-23 | Macario Hernandez (34) | Hispanic | San Antonio, TX | |
| 2019-12-23 | Richard Ruiz (38) | Hispanic | Arizona (Phoenix) | |
| 2019-12-22 | Romir Talley (24) | Black | Pennsylvania (Pittsburgh) | |
| 2019-12-22 | Kenneth Collins (46) | Black | Hattiesburg, MS | |
| 2019-12-22 | Jesse Donnelly Adams | White | California (Redding) | |
| 2019-12-21 | Brian Lee Mullen (57) | White | Evansville, IN | |
| 2019-12-21 | Marc Denver Thompson (26) | White | Carrollton, GA | |
| 2019-12-21 | Michael DeCastro (57) | White | Ithaca, NY | |
| 2019-12-21 | Mark Stoddard (40) | White | Huntington, UT | |
| 2019-12-20 | John Resetar (44) | White | Lynn, IN | |
| 2019-12-20 | Steven DeWayne Haizlip (61) | Black | Winston-Salem, NC | |
| 2019-12-19 | Jayson A. Colvin (38) | White | Umatilla, FL | |
| 2019-12-19 | Mohamed Ahemed Al-Hashemi (25) | Asian | Arizona (Tempe) | |
| 2019-12-19 | Christopher Joseph Gray (29) | White | Davis, CA | |
| 2019-12-19 | Emanuel Johnson (21) | Black | Brentwood, NY | |
| 2019-12-19 | Gary Wayne Madewell (38) | White | Carthage, TN | |
| 2019-12-19 | Kentrey Marquis Witherspoon (28) | Black | Lenoir, NC | |
| 2019-12-19 | Jason Elliot Waterhouse (47) | White | Lakewood, CO | |
| 2019-12-18 | Tyler Hall (29) | Unknown race | Tulsa, OK | |
| 2019-12-17 | Kyle Horton (31) | White | Wilmington, NC | |
| 2019-12-17 | Clyde Jacob Sullivan (27) | White | Fort Walton Beach, FL | |
| 2019-12-17 | Paul Jarvis (63) | Unknown race | El Paso, TX | |
| 2019-12-17 | Ricky Lee Gardipee (41) | White | Great Falls, MT | |
| 2019-12-17 | Dana Brown (27) | Native Hawaiian and Pacific Islander | Kapolei, HI | |
| 2019-12-16 | Jorge Serrano | Hispanic | Los Angeles, CA | |
| 2019-12-16 | Dustin Spencer (34) | Native Hawaiian and Pacific Islander | Honolulu, HI | |
| 2019-12-16 | Bernie Rascon (28) | White | San Bernardino, CA | |
| 2019-12-15 | Mario Alberto Torres (27) | Hispanic | Brownsville, TX | |
| 2019-12-15 | Mohammad Jamal Isaifan (40) | Asian | Akron, OH | |
| 2019-12-15 | Kean Walker (23) | White | Milwaukee, WI | |
| 2019-12-15 | Chiasher Fong Vue (52) | Asian | Minneapolis, MN | |
| 2019-12-14 | Victor A. Parsons (42) | White | Arizona (Tucson) | |
| 2019-12-14 | Donald Young (33) | | Ohio (Bellevue) | Police attempted to arrest Young for a warrant. Police tased, restrained, and handcuffed Young, who died. His death was ruled a homicide. |
| 2019-12-14 | Alejandro Betancourt-Mendoza (18) | Hispanic | Washington (Pasco) | Officers were investigating a crime when a suspect stabbed them. The suspect was shot and killed by officers. |
| 2019-12-14 | Louis Patrick Veal (65) | Black | Michigan (Detroit) | |
| 2019-12-14 | Jamee Christopher Deonte Johnson (22) | Black | Florida (Jacksonville) | |
| 2019-12-12 | Erik Lee (43) | Unknown race | Orange, CA | |
| 2019-12-12 | Anthony Tovar (43) | White | Washington (Renton) | Police responded to a report of an armed man. Officers thought they saw the suspect with a shotgun and fired when shot at him, resulting in the suspect dropping the shotgun and fleeing. Police said he refused to follow commands to stop, then brandished a knife while approaching officers. The officer fired again, hitting the suspect, who later died at Harborview hospital. |
| 2019-12-12 | Romello Barnes (22) | Black | Florida (Tampa) | |
| 2019-12-12 | Cortez Bufford (24) | Black | St. Louis, MO | |
| 2019-12-12 | Cade Humphrey (30) | White | New Cordell, OK | |
| 2019-12-12 | Taveonte Art Emmanuel (34) | Black | Anaheim, CA | |
| 2019-12-12 | Bradley Cutchens (23) | White | Ozark, AL | |
| 2019-12-11 | Matthew Jonathon Krupar (31) | White | League City, TX | |
| 2019-12-10 | Mauro Carrillo (42) | Hispanic | Hesperia, CA | |
| 2019-12-10 | Delos Peter Lowe (68) | White | Elkland, PA | |
| 2019-12-10 | Terrance Edward White (66) | White | Semmes, AL | |
| 2019-12-10 | Montay Steven Penning (23) | Black | Beloit, WI | |
| 2019-12-10 | David Anderson (47) | Black | New Jersey (Jersey City) | 2019 Jersey City shooting |
| 2019-12-10 | Francine Graham (50) | Black | New Jersey (Jersey City) | 2019 Jersey City shooting |
| 2019-12-10 | Robert Allen Elfgen (42) | White | Fort Madison, IA | |
| 2019-12-10 | Daniel Eric Condon (55) | White | Arietta, NY | |
| 2019-12-09 | Antonio Nichols (47) | Black | Independence, LA | |
| 2019-12-08 | Koben S. Henriksen (51) | White | Oregon (Portland) | |
| 2019-12-08 | Joanna Dixon (23) | Black | New York (Brooklyn) | |
| 2019-12-07 | Mark Richard Coleman (65) | White | Nokomis, FL | |
| 2019-12-07 | London T. Phillips (35) | White | Fayetteville, AR | |
| 2019-12-06 | Dominick Matt (17) | Black | Bentonville, AR | |
| 2019-12-06 | Hunter Steven James Lowry (23) | White | Westminster, CO | |
| 2019-12-05 | Chad James Green (41) | White | San Bernardino, CA | |
| 2019-12-05 | Alvern Donell Walker (58) | Black | Avon, CO | |
| 2019-12-05 | Demetrius Williams (31) | Black | Marshall, TX | |
| 2019-12-05 | Lamar Alexander (41) | Black | Florida (Miramar) | 2019 Miramar shootout |
| 2019-12-05 | Jerome Hill (41) | Black | Florida (Miramar) | 2019 Miramar shootout |
| 2019-12-05 | Frank Ordonez (27) | Hispanic | Florida (Miramar) | 2019 Miramar shootout |
| 2019-12-05 | Richard Cutshaw (70) | White | Florida (Miramar) | 2019 Miramar shootout |
| 2019-12-04 | John Elliott Neville (56) | | North Carolina (Winston-Salem) | Video shows that five detention officers at the Forsyth County Jail restrained a man while he said "I can't breathe" multiple times and apparently suffered a seizure. |
| 2019-12-03 | Cameron Lamb (26) | | Missouri (Kansas City) | An officer responding to a nearby traffic accident noticed a red truck chasing another car. The police helicopter saw the truck split from the other vehicle and pull up to a house, which was later discovered to be Lamb's residence. Shortly thereafter, two detectives, Troy Schwalm and Eric DeValkenaere, approached the home from opposite directions. DeValkenaere shot Lamb after claiming to see him point a gun at Det. Schwalm, killing him while he was backing into his garage. On June 18, 2020, Detective DeValkenaere was charged with first-degree involuntary manslaughter and armed criminal action. |
| 2019-12-03 | Miguel Russo (31) | Black | New York (Syracuse) | |
| 2019-12-03 | Thomas Cole Thompson (58) | White | Ada, OK | |
| 2019-12-02 | Dai Phuoc Nguyen (38) | Asian | El Monte, CA | |
| 2019-12-02 | Neil Lyle Chiago (18) | Native American | Arizona (Mesa) | |
| 2019-12-02 | Jerric Harris (21) | Black | Florida (Daytona Beach) | |
| 2019-12-02 | Michael Lorenzo Dean (28) | Black | Texas (Temple) | |
| 2019-12-01 | Steven Kerr (25) | White | Florida (Plant City) | |
| 2019-12-01 | Anthony Rosso (68) | White | New Jersey (Secaucus) | |
| 2019-12-01 | Jimmie Phillips (68) | Black | Georgia (Morrow) | |
| 2019-12-01 | Yemerson Melendez (16) | Hispanic | Florida (Fort Pierce) | |
| 2019-12-01 | Donald J. Eversen (60) | White | California (Concord) | |
| 2019-12-01 | Jordan Oliver (20) | White | Pennsylvania (Warrior Run) | |

== See also ==
- Death in custody § United States
- Henry A. Wallace Police Crime Public Database
- List of cases of police brutality
- List of countries with annual rates and counts for killings by law enforcement officers
- List of law enforcement officers killed in the line of duty in the United States
- List of law enforcement officers convicted for an on-duty killing in the United States
- List of shootings by US immigration agents
- List of police reforms related to the George Floyd protests
- List of unarmed African Americans killed by law enforcement officers in the United States
- Lists of killings by law enforcement officers
- Police brutality in the United States
- Police misconduct § United States
- Police riot § United States
- Police use of deadly force in the United States
