= David Welch (baseball) =

Sydney Blue Sox – No. 45
- Pitcher
- Born: 2 June 1983 (age 43); Sydney
- Bats: Right Throws: Left

ABL debut
- 6 November, 2010, for the Sydney Blue Sox

ABL statistics (through 2010–11)
- Win–loss record: 5–0
- Earned run average: 1.44
- Strikeouts: 59
- Stats at Baseball Reference

Career highlights and awards
- ABL Pitcher of the Year (2010–11); ABL Pitcher of the Week (2010–11, Weeks 3 & 6)

David John Welch (born 2 June 1983, in Sydney) is an Australian professional baseball pitcher in the who is a free agent.

== Professional career ==
=== Milwaukee Brewers ===
In 2005, he was drafted by the Milwaukee Brewers in the 20th round of the 2005 Major League Baseball draft. He played for the Rookie-League Helena Brewers. He was promoted to the Class-A West Virginia Power in 2006, where he was tied for the South Atlantic League lead with one shutout. He was placed on the disabled list on 2 June with back spasms and was reinstated on 15 June.

Welch's 2007 season was spent with the Class-A Advanced Brevard County Manatees where he allowed the fewest baserunners per game by a starter in the Florida State League (FSL). He recorded the ninth-lowest ERA (ERA) with a 3.43 clip in the FSL. He allowed the second-fewest walks per nine innings and fifth-best ERA as a starter in the FSL. He went 6–7 with a 3.43 ERA in 29 games, 20 starts, and led the team in innings pitched with 120 2/3 innings. He was placed on the disabled list on 13 April with a concussion and was reinstated on 23 April.

Welch spent the 2008 season with the Double-A Huntsville Stars. He went 11–4 with a 3.90 ERA in 26 games, all starts. He had one shutout. Welch played all of the 2009 season in Huntsville. He was released by the Brewers during spring training 2010.

=== Sydney Blue Sox ===
Welch was an integral part of the Sydney rotation along with Chris Oxspring. He finished the regular season with a league best 5–0 record with a 1.44 ERA. Welch threw a no-hitter against the Adelaide Bite in game one of the preliminary final series, the first in Australian Baseball League history.

David was expected to resign either in the US, Japan or Korea during 2011, but on 18 July 2011 announced his retirement from professional baseball.

== International career ==
In 2009, he was selected to play in the 2009 Baseball World Cup and posted an Australian record 13 strikeouts in only 7 innings against Chinese Taipei.
