= Trent Schmutter =

Australian baseball player

- Outfield
- Born: 27 August 1987 (age 39); Sydney
- Bats: R Throws: R

ABL debut
- 19 November, 2010

ABL statistics
- Batting average: .316
- On-base plus slugging: .794
- Runs batted in: 12
- Stats at Baseball Reference

Career highlights and awards
- 2010–11 Rookie of the Year

Trent Schmutter (born 27 August 1987 in Sydney) is an Australian former professional outfielder who had played for Sydney Blue Sox.

In 2011, he was awarded the 2010-11 Australian Baseball League season Rookie of the Year.

Since 2023, Trent is currently working as a teacher and deputy principal at Pittwater High School.
