= Glenn Williams =

Australian baseball player (born 1977)

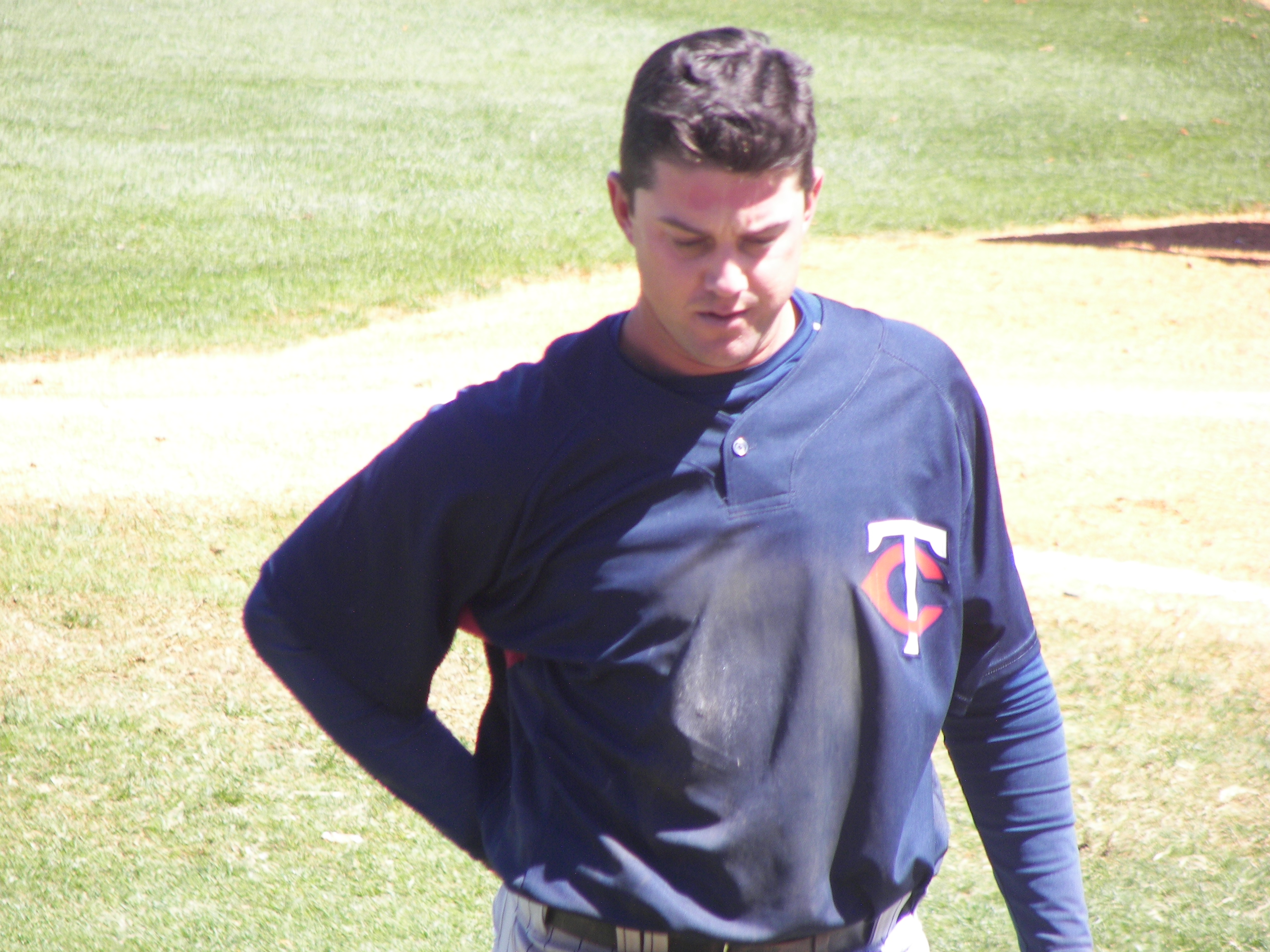
- Williams in 2007
- Third baseman
- Born: 18 July 1977 (age 49); Gosford, New South Wales
- Batted: Switch Threw: Right

MLB debut
- 7 June, 2005, for the Minnesota Twins

Last MLB appearance
- 28 June, 2005, for the Minnesota Twins

MLB statistics
- Batting average: .425
- Home runs: 0
- Runs batted in: 3
- Stats at Baseball Reference

Teams
- Minnesota Twins (2005)

Member of the Australian

Baseball Hall of Fame
- Induction: 2012
Medals
Men's baseball
Representing Australia
Olympics
Silver medal – second place	Athens 2004	Team competition

Glenn David Williams (born 18 July 1977) is a retired third baseman from Australia, who played in the Minnesota Twins organization. He played in Major League Baseball for the Twins during the 2005 season. He was a member of the Australia national team that won the silver medal at the 2004 Summer Olympics in Athens, Greece.

Williams is the elder of two children. His father Gary Williams has been heavily involved in the development of baseball in Australia. Both Gary and Glenn Williams have represented their native Australia in international baseball competitions.

In 1993, as a 16-year-old, Glenn signed a lucrative free agent contract with the Atlanta Braves for an estimated 1.3 million Australian dollars. He played baseball for the minor league affiliates of the Atlanta Braves, Toronto Blue Jays, and Minnesota Twins.

After spending over 10 years in the minor leagues, Glenn made his major league debut with the Minnesota Twins during the 2005 season. In 2007, Glenn played for the Minnesota Twins Triple-A affiliate team, the Rochester Red Wings. Williams had a 13-game career hitting streak, as he had a hit in every game that he played in while in the major leagues.

On 19 August 2010 Glenn was announced as manager for the Australian Baseball League foundation club Sydney Blue Sox in their inaugural 2010–11 season.

On 9 April 2021, Baseball Australia announced Glenn as the new chief executive officer after former CEO Cam Vale stepped down.
