= David Kandilas =

Australian baseball player (born 1990)

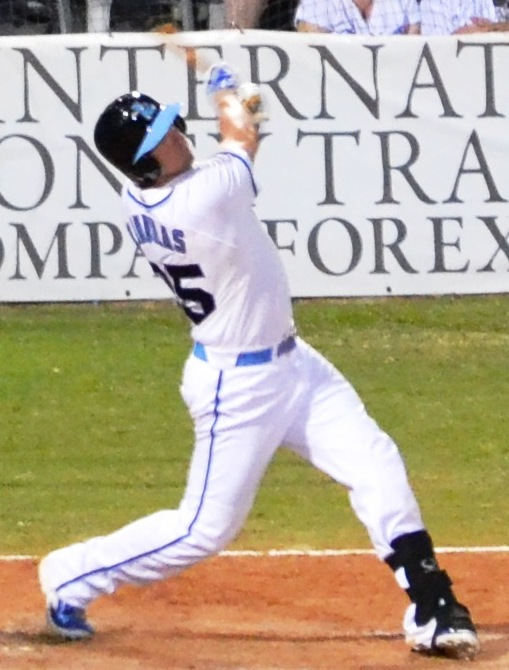
- Kandilas with the Sydney Blue Sox in 2014
- Outfielder
- Born: 14 September 1990 (age 35); Sydney, Australia
- Bats: Right Throws: Right
- Stats at Baseball Reference
Medals
Men's baseball
Representing Australia
Haarlem Baseball Week
Bronze medal – third place	2016 Haarlem	National team

David Nicholas Kandilas (born 14 September 1990) is a retired Australian professional baseball outfielder who last played for the Mannheim Tornados of the Baseball Bundesliga in 2019. He has previously played for the Sydney Blue Sox and Canberra Cavalry in the Australian Baseball League (ABL) and has been a member of the Australian National Baseball team since 2009.

== Career ==
Kandilas hit for the cycle in Ogden, Utah on 25 June 2011 whilst playing for the Colorado Rockies rookie-level affiliate, Casper Ghosts. This was the first cycle hit in the Pioneer League since 2007. Kandilas hit for the cycle again in 2011 in Melbourne, Australia on 30 December playing for the Sydney Blue Sox against the Melbourne Aces. He was the first player in the newly reformed (2010) Australian Baseball League to hit for the cycle. Also in 2011, Kandilas earned five consecutive unintentional walks in a single nine inning game playing for the Blue Sox, setting an ABL record.

While playing for the Modesto Nuts in 2014, Kandilas led the entire California League in outfield assists. He was promoted to the Double-A Tulsa Drillers of the Texas League in 2014 and finished the 2014 US Minor League season with the Triple-A Colorado Springs Sky Sox of the Pacific Coast League. Playing for the Canberra Cavalry in the 2017–18 season, Kandilas had his best ABL year, hitting .380 and scoring 44 runs batted in and hitting 12 home runs during the season. He played center field for Team Australia vs. World All-Stars in the Australian Baseball League's 2014, 2016 and 2017 All-Star Games.

Kandilas was signed by Niigata Albirex in 2015 and played in the Baseball Challenge League in Japan as an outfielder. In 2016, he represented Team Australia at the Honkbal Tournament in Haarlem, Netherlands. He played as an outfielder for the Canberra Cavalry in the Australian Baseball League, season 2016–17, being then selected to represent Australia in the 2017 World Baseball Classic in Japan. His batting average for the tournament was .400 and second overall for Team Australia. He returned to the Canberra Cavalry for the 2017–18 ABL season and had a batting average of .380 for the season, being the highest batting average for an Australian (non-import) player. He also hit 12 home runs, including a grand slam, and 44 RBI (runs batted in) which was equal first in the league and highest for an Australian player.

On 13 May 2018 Kandilas headed back to Japan for the 2018 season, having signed with Ehime Mandarin Pirates of the Shikoku Island League.

Kandilas signed with the Mannheim Tornados of Germany's Baseball Bundesliga for the 2019 season.

For the 2019–20 Australian Baseball League season, Kandilas played for the Canberra Cavalry.

== International career ==
Kandilas was selected for the Australia national baseball team at the 2009 World Baseball Classic, 2013 World Baseball Classic, 2016 Haarlem Baseball Week, 2017 World Baseball Classic, 2018 exhibition games against Japan and 2019 WBSC Premier12.

On 20 February 2018 he was selected for exhibition games against Japan.

On 8 October 2019 Kandilas was selected at the 2019 WBSC Premier12.
