= Todd Grattan =

Sydney Blue Sox – No. 32
- Pitcher
- Born: 7 September 1986 (age 40); Campbelltown, New South Wales, Australia
- Bats: Right Throws: Right

MLB statistics
- Wins: 2-0
- Earned Run Average: 5.12
- Strikeouts: 35
- Stats at Baseball Reference

Todd Grattan (born 7 September 1986), nicknamed "Cougar", is an Australian professional baseball player for the Sydney Blue Sox of the Australian Baseball League.

== Career ==
He has played with the Blue Sox since 2010 as a relief pitcher. In his first season with the team in 2010, he played in eight games, going 1–0 with a 3.15 ERA. Grattan also played college baseball in Texas and played professionally in Japan.
