= Chris Oxspring =

Australian baseball player (born 1977)

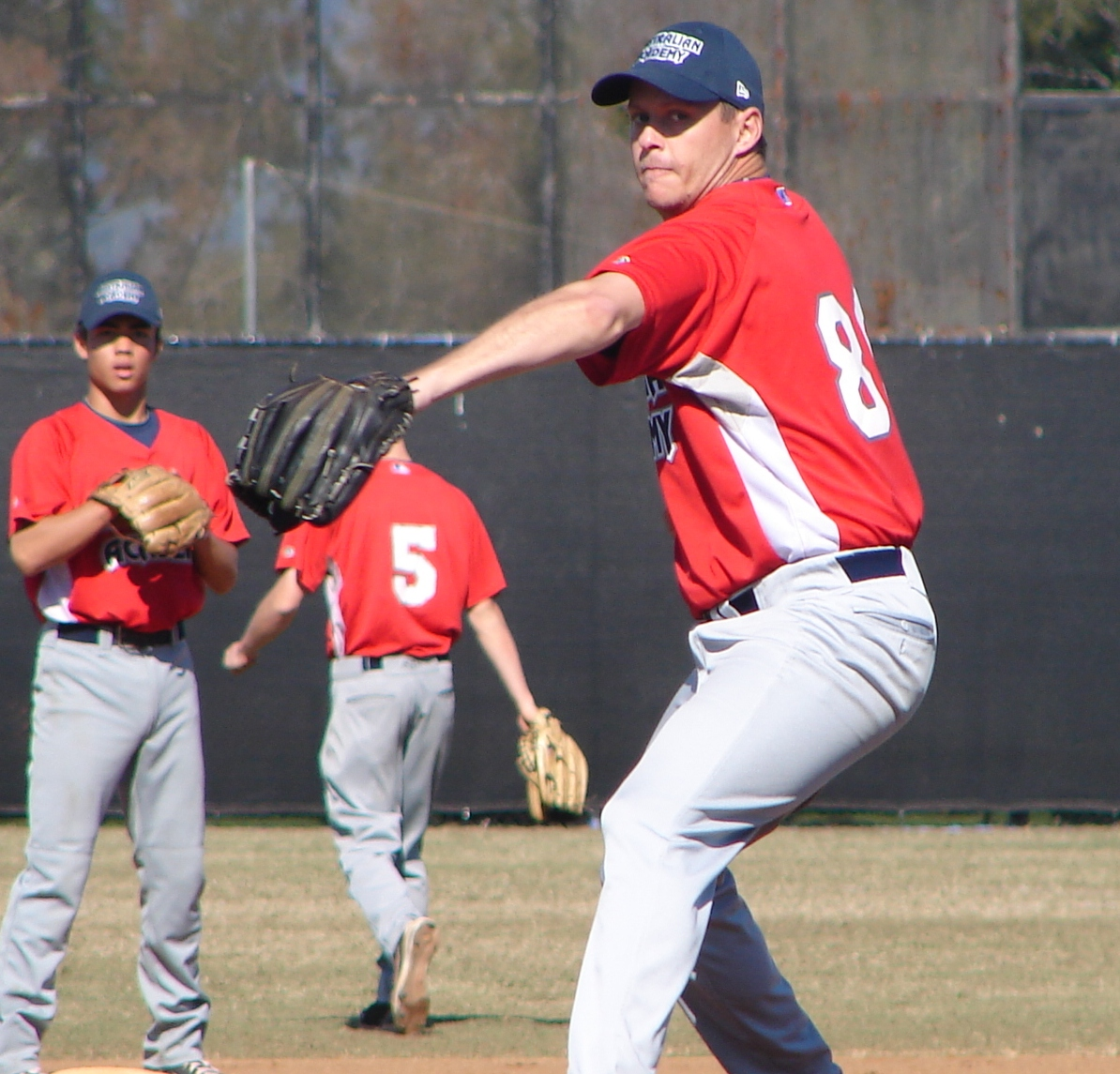

Sydney Blue Sox
- Pitcher
- Born: 13 May 1977 (age 49); Ipswich, Australia
- Batted: Left Threw: Right

Professional debut
- MLB: September 2, 2005, for the San Diego Padres
- NPB: April 6, 2006, for the Hanshin Tigers
- KBO: July 21, 2007, for the LG Twins

Last appearance
- MLB: September 17, 2005, for the San Diego Padres
- NPB: August 26, 2006, for the Hanshin Tigers
- KBO: October 3, 2015, for the KT Wiz

MLB statistics
- Win–loss record: 0–0
- Earned run average: 3.75
- Strikeouts: 11

KBO statistics
- Win–loss record: 49–40
- Earned run average: 3.90
- Strikeouts: 567

NPB statistics
- Win–loss record: 4–2
- Earned run average: 5.12
- Strikeouts: 51
- Stats at Baseball Reference

Teams
- As player: San Diego Padres (2005); Hanshin Tigers (2006); LG Twins (2007–2009); Lotte Giants (2013–2014); KT Wiz (2015); Sydney Blue Sox (2010 – 2024); As coach: Lotte Giants (2016–2018)
Medals
Men's baseball
Representing Australia
Olympic Games
Silver medal – second place	2004 Athens	Team

Chris Andrew Oxspring (born 13 May 1977) is an Australian professional baseball pitcher who has played Major League Baseball, Nippon Professional Baseball, KBO League, and currently plays in the Australian Baseball League (ABL) for the Sydney Blue Sox.

== Career ==
Oxspring joined the Hanshin Tigers in Nippon Professional Baseball (NPB) for the 2006 season. On 15 December 2006, Oxspring signed a minor league contract with the Milwaukee Brewers. On 10 July 2007, his contract with the Brewers was sold to the LG Twins of the Korea Baseball Organization just one day before serving as the Pacific Coast League's starting pitcher in the 2007 Triple-A All-Star Game.

Internationally, Oxspring was a star for Australia in the 2004 Olympics, pitching 2–0 with wins both against Japan, earning him a silver medal.

Oxspring had the honour of throwing out the first official pitch of the Australian Baseball League to catcher Andrew Graham when the Blue Sox played the Canberra Cavalry on 6 November 2010. Oxspring threw six shutout innings in a game Sydney won 1–0.

On 8 December 2010, while playing with the Sydney Oxspring signed a minor league deal with an invitation to Spring training with the Detroit Tigers. At the end of the 2010–11 Australian Baseball League regular season, he led the league in innings pitched (68.2), game started (11) and strikeouts (71).

In June 2011, Detroit released Oxspring after struggling for their AAA affiliate, the Toledo Mud Hens conceding a 6.53 ERA over 20.2 innings. He shortly after signed with independent team the Somerset Patriots for the remainder of 2011.

In 2013 and 2014, Oxspring played with the Lotte Giants of the KBO League. In 2015, he played with the KT Wiz. From 2016 to 2018, he had served as a pitching coach for the Lotte Giants. On 3 December 2018 Oxspring announced that he will no longer coach the Giants and return to Australia to reunite with his family.

Oxspring returned to the Blue Sox for the 2022–23 Australian Baseball League season at 45 years old and became the oldest Australian born player to play in the league’s history, making the most appearances in his career since the 2012–13 Australian Baseball League season. He overtook 44 year old Brendan Kingman who pitched one inning in the 2017–18 Australian Baseball League season and is the second oldest player to appear in the league after Dae-sung Koo who made two single appearances at age 48 and 53.

46 year old Oxspring returned for the last regular season game of the 2022–23 Australian Baseball League season, pitching 1 2/3 innings against the Perth Heat, giving up a home-run to Jake Bowey.
