= Luke Wilkins =

Australian baseball player (born 1989)

- Pitcher
- Born: 27 December 1989 (age 36); Sydney, Australia
- Bats: Right Throws: Right

Luke Wilkins (born 27 December 1989) is an Australian former professional baseball pitcher.

== Career ==
After many years playing for New South Wales at junior level, in 2008 Wilkins began his overseas playing career at Clarendon College, a division 1 NJCAA college in Texas. In two years at Clarendon, he posted a 7–2 record with a 8.02 ERA over 28 appearances.

Following his second year with Clarendon, Wilkins returned to Australia and as a 20-year-old made his debut in the Australian Baseball League for the Canberra Cavalry in their inaugural season. In limit appearances for the Cavalry he had a turbulent start to his career, posting a 32.40 ERA in four games, including one start.

From the 2011–12 Australian Baseball League season onwards, he signed with his hometown Sydney Blue Sox. In 2013, he posted what would have been the ABL's best ever ERA of 0.28 in 21 appearances out of the bullpen. However, his 32 2/3 innings pitched was four innings under the league minimum for recognised statistics.

The following season, he was moved to the Blue Sox starting rotation, until 2019–20 when he was moved back to the bullpen. In ten ABL seasons and 104 appearances, he holds a 21–17 record with 3.96 ERA.

Outside of his ABL career, Wilkins pitched in the Frontier League for the Washington Wild Things in 2015 and 2016 and played for three different teams in the American Association in 2019.

Wilkins was selected as a member of the Australia national baseball team for the 2019 WBSC Premier12.

Wilkins is a Ryde Hawks junior and credits pitching coach James Murphy for much of his pitching development.

On 8 June 2024 Wilkins debuted as a closer for the Amsterdam Pirates in a game against Neptunus in the Dutch Hoofdklasse. In two innings he struck out one and allowed one hit. On 1 March 2025, Wilkins announced his retirement from professional baseball via Instagram.
