= Todd Van Steensel =

Australian baseball player (born 1991)

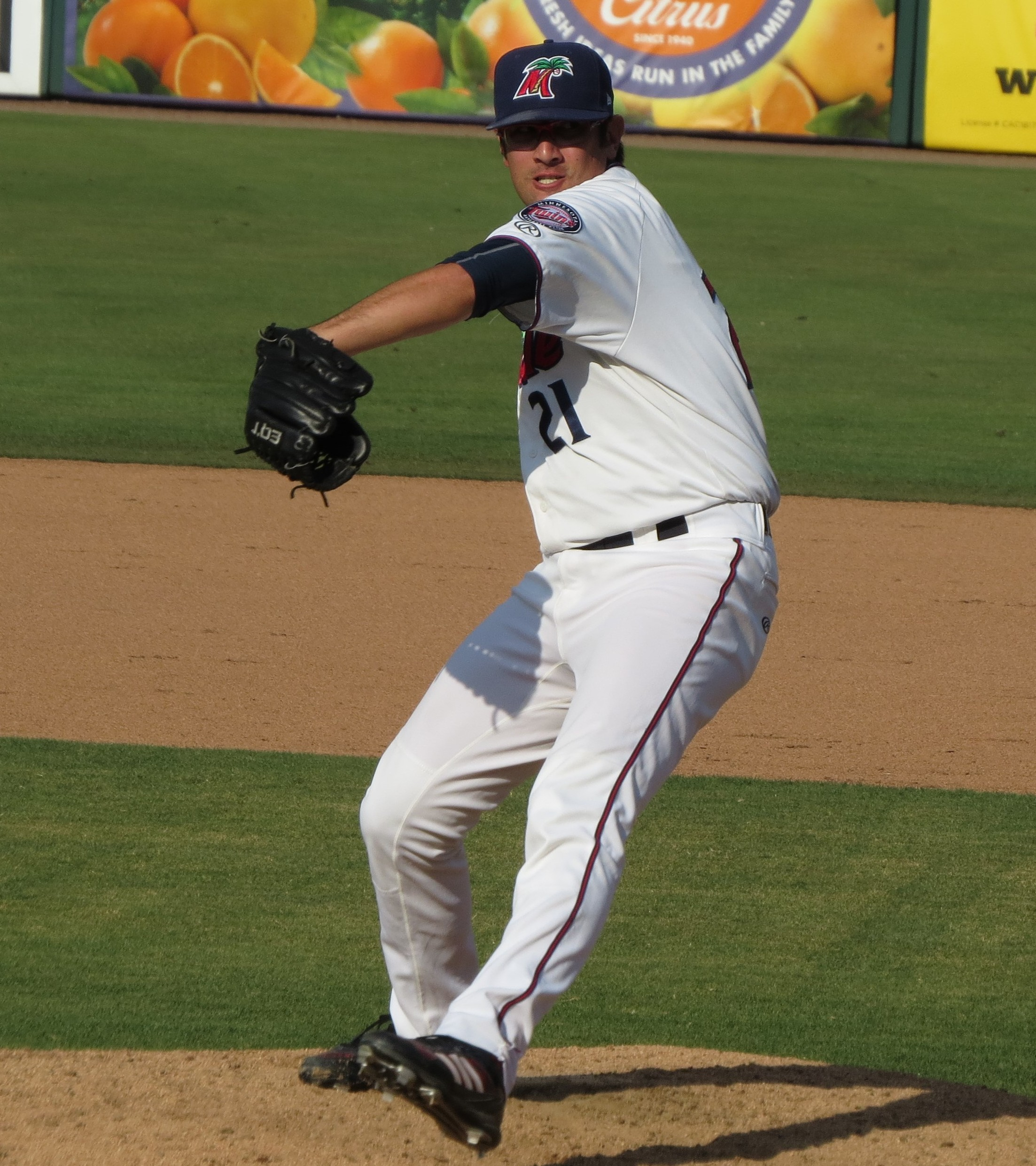
- Relief pitcher
- Born: 14 January 1991 (age 35); Sydney, Australia
- Bats: Right Throws: Right
- Stats at Baseball Reference

Todd Bertram Van Steensel (born 14 January 1991) is an Australian former professional baseball pitcher.

== Career ==
Van Steensel was born on 14 January in 1991 in Sydney, Australia. Van Steensel has represented his native Australia on several occasions, most notably in the MLB opening series in 2013/14. He formerly played for the Sydney Blue Sox in the Australian Baseball League where he garnered the nickname "Hop Scotch" after one his superstition of not stepping on the foul lines.

=== Philadelphia Phillies ===
Van Steensel began his career for the GCL Phillies in the Philadelphia Phillies organization in 2009. Van Steensel recorded a 6.44 ERA in 12 games for the club. He was released during Spring Training in 2010. Van Steensel joined the Sydney Blue Sox of the Australian Baseball League for the 2010 season.

=== Minnesota Twins ===
Van Steensel signed a minor league with the Minnesota Twins on 6 June 2011. He finished the season with the rookie ball Elizabethton Twins, recording a 5-2 record and 5.68 ERA with 58 strikeouts.

=== Corendon Kinheim ===
2012 saw Van Steensel head to Europe to play for Corendon Kinheim in the Dutch National League. In his first trip to the mound (June 2012) he pitched 2.2 innings, giving up just 1 hit and no free passes whilst striking out 6 (six). Corendon Kinheim would go on to win the championship.

In mid July Van Steensel returned to Australia, after an elbow injury sustained while playing basketball required surgery.

In 2013 he unsuccessfully attempted to stop a face off between Sydney Blue Sox catcher Daniel Arribas and Brisbane Bandits runner Patrick Leonard. The incident escalated rapidly after Josh Roberts charged from the Brisbane dugout and tried to remove Arribas' head.

=== Minnesota Twins (second stint) ===
Van Steensel rejoined the Minnesota Twins organization on a minor league contract on 6 February 2014. He split the season between the High-A Fort Myers Miracle and the High-A Cedar Rapids Kernels. In late 2014 Van Steensel announced he would sit out the rest of the year after a long minor league season. He spent the 2015 season in Fort Myers, registering a 2.32 ERA in 46 appearances. In 2016, Van Steensel split the season between the Double-A Chattanooga Lookouts and Fort Myers, accumulating a 5-2 record and 3.30 ERA in 44 games. He spent the 2017 season in Chattanooga, pitching to a 5-3 record and a stellar 1.38 ERA in 58.2 innings of work. Van Steensel recorded a 5-1 record and 3.01 ERA for Chattanooga before being released by Minnesota on 7 August 2018.

He was named the reliever of the 2018–19 season.

=== St. Paul Saints ===
Van Steensel signed with the St. Paul Saints of the American Association for the 2019 season. He recorded a 3-2 record and 4.33 ERA with 43 strikeouts in 2019. He was released following the season on 10 January 2020.

=== Fargo-Moorhead RedHawks ===
On 3 February 2020, Van Steensel signed with the Fargo-Moorhead RedHawks of the American Association. He was released prior to the season on 18 June 2020.

=== Mariachis de Guadalajara ===
On 1 March 2021, Van Steensel announced on his Twitter that he had signed with the Mariachis de Guadalajara of the Mexican League. Van Steensel registered a 4.85 ERA in 26 appearances for the team.

=== Lake Country DockHounds ===
On 7 January 2022, Van Steensel signed with the Lake Country DockHounds of the American Association of Professional Baseball. On 12 May 2022, Van Steensel was released by the DockHounds without appearing in a game.

=== Gastonia Honey Hunters ===
On 22 February 2023, Van Steensel signed with the Gastonia Honey Hunters of the Atlantic League of Professional Baseball. In 22 games for Gastonia, he struggled to a 6.48 ERA with 18 strikeouts in 25.0 innings of work. On 11 August, Van Steensel retired from professional baseball.

== International career ==
Van Steensel was a member of the Australia national baseball team in the Australian Challenge, 2014 21U Baseball World Cup, 2017 World Baseball Classic Qualification in 2016, 2017 World Baseball Classic, 2018 exhibition games against Japan 2019 WBSC Premier12, and 2023 World Baseball Classic.
