= Craig Anderson (2010s pitcher) =

Australian baseball player (born 1980)

- Starting pitcher
- Born: 30 October 1980 (age 46); Gosford, New South Wales, Australia
- Bats: Left Throws: Left
- Stats at Baseball Reference
Medals
Men's baseball
Representing Australia
Olympics
Silver medal – second place	Athens 2004	Team competition

Craig Anderson (born 30 October 1980) is an Australian former professional left-handed baseball pitcher who pitched for the Australia national team, winning the silver medal in the 2004 Summer Olympics. He played for the Sydney Blue Sox in the Australian Baseball League after pitching in Minor League Baseball for nine seasons.

== Professional career ==
Anderson signed with the Seattle Mariners in February 1999 by scout Jim Colborn. He was selected to in the 2000 All-Star Futures Game. He played in the Mariners farm system through 2004, posting 11 wins and a 3.56 ERA with the Triple-A Tacoma Rainiers that year. In 2005, he pitched for the independent Brockton Rox.

Anderson pitched for Australia in the 2000 and 2004 Summer Olympics, with Australia finishing second in 2004.

He played for Australia in the 2006 World Baseball Classic (WBC), after which he joined the Baltimore Orioles organization. He began 2008 pitching in middle relief for the Norfolk Tides of the International League. It was his second season with Norfolk and his fifth in Triple-A. He became a free agent at the end of the season. He played for Australia in the 2009 WBC, starting the team's first game of the tournament against Mexico, allowing six runs in one inning in a mercy rule win.

He pitched for Brockton in 2009 and for Neptunus in the Dutch Honkbal Hoofdklasse in 2011.

=== Sydney Blue Sox ===
Anderson played the first nine seasons in the Australian Baseball League (ABL) announcing his retirement at the conclusion of the 2018-19 ABL season. He currently holds the record for most games started as a pitcher (88), innings pitched (556.2), losses (32) and tied first for most wins (35) with Daniel Schmidt. He finished his career 35–32 with a 3.61 ERA in 99 games.

Anderson was awarded the pitcher of the year during the 2012–13 ABL season.
