= Blacktown International Sportspark =

Sports venue in Sydney, Australia

Coordinates: 33°46′17″S 150°51′13″E

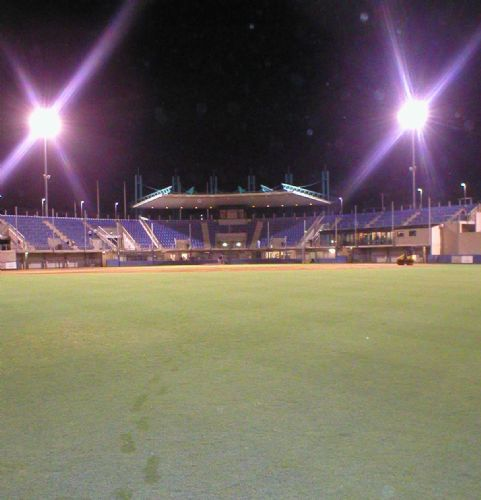
- Interactive map of Blacktown International Sportspark
- Location: Sydney, Australia
- Operator: Blacktown Venue Management Ltd
- Capacity: 10,000

Construction
- Opened: 1999

Website
- blacktownsportspark.com.au

Ground information

International information
- Only women's ODI: 29 January 2012: Australia v New Zealand
- As of 7 September 2020; Source: CricketArchive

Blacktown International Sportspark (BISP) (officially known as Blacktown Olympic Park) is a multi-sports venue located in Rooty Hill, a suburb in Sydney, Australia. The venue includes two cricket grounds, which have also been used for Australian rules football, an athletics track and field, three baseball diamonds, two soccer fields, four softball diamonds, administration centers and park land.

It was constructed for the 2000 Sydney Olympics to host softball and baseball events. The facilities have since been used as a training and administrative base for the Greater Western Sydney Giants from 2010 to 2012, and for the Western Sydney Wanderers FC since 2012. Since 2010 the Sydney Blue Sox of the Australian Baseball League have used the main baseball stadium as their home field.

== Facilities ==
- Blacktown Baseball Stadium
- Blacktown ISP Oval
- Blacktown Softball Stadium
- Blacktown Football Park

== Australian Rules Football & Cricket Centre ==
The Australian Rules Football & Cricket centre was constructed in 2008. It features two ovals for Australian Rules Football & Cricket, stadium, function facilities and an indoor practice centre for Cricket. The official opening of the centre was held in on 22 August 2009 with the Mayor of Blacktown City, Councillor Charlie Lowles joined by Chief Executive Officers from AFL NSW/ACT and Cricket NSW.

== Greater Western Sydney Giants ==
Greater Western Sydney Giants (GWS) had a permanent presence at Blacktown from 2010 to 2014. After the Blacktown City Council spent $27 million on an AFL stadium & training facility, GWS abandoned the facility, in favour of a $45m facility built by the NSW Government at Sydney Olympic Park, Homebush in Sydney's inner west, that also included an upgrade to the Sydney Showground Stadium at Sydney Olympic Park. The club has used the stadium for AFL Women's and men's reserves games in the Victorian Football League.

== Blacktown Football Park ==
The combined football facilities on the southern side are known as "Blacktown Football Park", and are the Blacktown Spartans home ground and the Western Sydney Wanderers training facility and mini-stadium known as the Wanderers Football Park. In addition to two broadcast level boutique stadiums, there are another dozen football pitches, the Wanderers administrative & training base and several Five-a-side football courts.

=== Blacktown Spartans ===
A boutique stadium at the facility hosts National Premier League fixtures for Blacktown Spartans FC. There is a small grandstand with the player facilities, seating and a canteen. The far side has metal bench railings while the two ends are slight elevated grassy hills.

=== Western Sydney Wanderers ===
When the Wanderers started in 2012 the club used the Athletics Centre grandstand as temporary offices and the grassed middle of the field as their training pitch, with some pre-season games played on it. The youth team would also use the Spartans stadium for Youth League & NPL fixtures.

In 2014, Western Sydney Wanderers began the process of building a centre of excellence, consisting of a training base, offices and their youth academy at Blacktown International Sportspark. As part of the multimillion-dollar elite training base and academy, purpose-built grass playing fields, administration facilities, medical rooms and offices on the southern side of the precinct were built. The $15 million club funded project ran into a land rights issue that delayed the completion until 2019. The main pitch has a 500 capacity grandstand and the playing surface replicates the one at the Western Sydney Stadium and is known as the Wanderers Football Park.

In addition to being the training facility for the club it also hosts senior team pre-season matches, the W-League team, the youth side in the National Premier League system and junior league matches. The Wanderers first W-League match was a 2-1 win vs the Newcastle Jets on Saturday 2 January 2021, with Rosea Galea scoring both goals for the home side. The youth team defeated the Northern Tigers by 3-1 on Sunday 21 March 2021 at the ground. It has also been regularly used for the Wanderers NPL NSW team, and in May 2022 it hosted a competitive game for the A-League Men's team for the first time, with the Wanderers losing a 2022 Australia Cup play-off qualifier match against the Brisbane Roar.

== Cricket ==
The three-day match between Cricket Australia XI and New Zealanders in October 2015 was abandoned after concerns over the pitch. In the late afternoon on the first day the ball was bouncing unpredictably from the fast bowlers and by the second morning the pitch surface was severely cracked and saw the footmark and batting creases worn down to bare dirt. New Zealand bowled with spin only until the Australian declaration followed Carters dismissal before lunch as Tom Latham took the only bowling wicket in his entire high level playing career. New Zealand then refused to bat because of the dangerous state of the wicket and the game was abandoned after an hour spent discussing the situation between the teams & officials. Ryan Carters (209) and Aaron Finch (288 not out) scored 503 for the opening wicket and the match ended with the sole innings being Cricket Australia XI scoring 503/1 (dec) with New Zealand giving every player in the team a bowl except for wicket-keeper BJ Watling. The Finch-Carter partnership easily eclipsed the previous Australian first class record of 456 set by openers Ernie Mayne and Bill Ponsford for Victoria in 1923–24, and as of April 2026, the 4th highest first class opening partnership in cricket history.

The Indian cricket team in Australia in 2020–21 tour saw the visiting Indian team use the cricket ground as their Covid lockdown training area.

== Proposed developments ==
As part of Australia's unsuccessful 2018–2022 FIFA World Cup bid, the athletics track at the western end of the park was proposed to be developed into a soccer stadium named Blacktown Stadium. The stadium would have had 41,000-seat, a figure which would be downgraded to 26,000 post-tournament.

== See also ==
- 2000 Summer Olympics venues
