= Triple H (Sydney) =

Sydney, Australia; Australia
- Broadcast area: Lower & Upper North Shore
- Frequency: 100.1 MHz FM
- Branding: Triple H 100.1

Programming
- Format: Freeform
- Affiliations: CBAA

Ownership
- Owner: 2HHH FM Limited

History
- First air date: 2000

Technical information
- Class: Community radio
- ERP: 200 watts

Links
- Website: www.triplehfm.com.au

Triple H (call sign: 2HHH) is a community radio station located in Sydney, Australia. It services the Hornsby Shire and the Ku-ring-gai Council area. Triple H runs on a general community licence and is required to provide content most suited to its own population and minority groups. Membership is open to all members of the community.

== History ==
2HHH FM began at the end of 1999 involving a large section of the community. This group believed that the area was not being serviced adequately by the existing community radio station North FM. The frequency of 100.1 in the Hornsby Region became Triple H.

2HHH FM is a community radio station run by a company limited by guarantee.

When the Australian Communications and Media Authority reissued application for a permanent broadcasting licence in 2000 for the Hornsby/Kuring-gai area, the members assembled a presenter team, physically built the studio and prepared the programs and production for the aspirant transmissions Triple H scouted around the local businesses for transmitters and broadcasting gear that they did not already possess. They had to complete the task of getting a studio to air in six months.

They asked local business people to donate computers, compressors, transmitters, microphones, and made an application to the council for the use of the North FM antenna that was supplied by the council.

By December 2000, Triple H was on air.

== Present activities ==
Triple H is a group of members working together to move the station forward.

Triple H is owned by the community of Hornsby and Ku Ring Gai through membership of 2HHH FM Limited.
