= Sydney Blue Sox =

Australian professional baseball team

- Logo

Information
- League: Australian Baseball League
- Location: Blacktown, New South Wales
- Ballpark: Blacktown Baseball Stadium
- Founded: 2010
- Division championships: 2010–11
- Colours: Carolina blue; Black; White
- Ownership: None
- Manager: (United States) Brooke Knight

Current uniforms
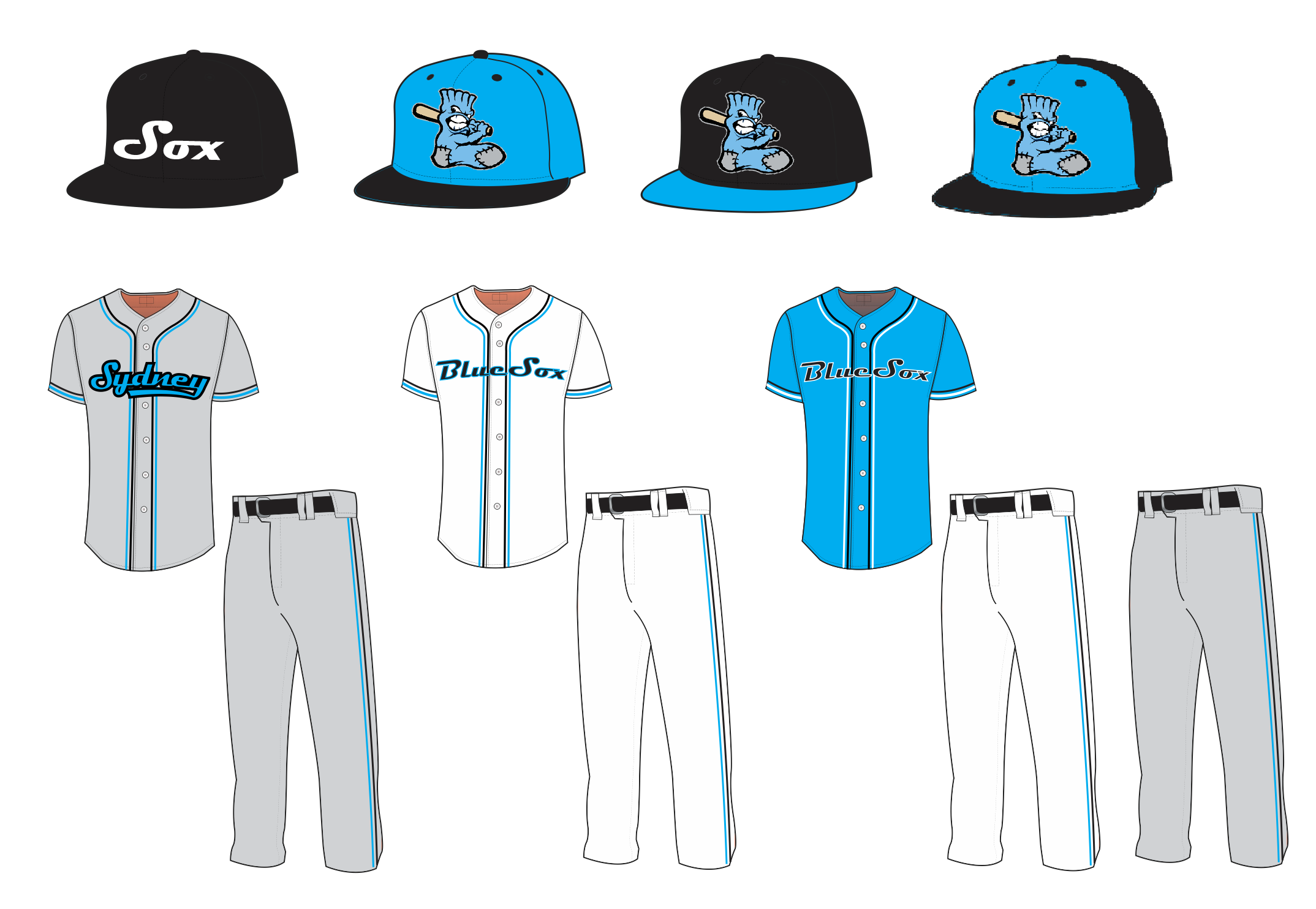

The Sydney Blue Sox are a professional baseball team, and one of six founding teams in the re-formed Australian Baseball League (ABL). The team plays their home games at Blacktown International Sportspark (BISP), one of the two venues used for baseball at the 2000 Sydney Olympics, when it was known as Blacktown Olympic Park. The Blue Sox hosted the league's Opening Day for the inaugural season on 6 November 2010, when they played against the Canberra Cavalry, and won the game 1–0. The Blue Sox are the only team in the Australian Baseball League to implement sabermetrics as a way to run their team with volunteer statistician, Anthony Rescan.

Fan response was very positive for the Blue Sox in the lead up to their inaugural season. As the sole team in New South Wales, they attracted interest beyond the Sydney metropolitan region; as far north as Newcastle, which hosted the former ABL franchise Hunter Eagles throughout the 1990s. Five hundred season tickets were allocated for the 2010–11 season, which sold out two months prior to the season's start; a waiting list for 2011–12 season tickets was soon created. Such was the demand to see professional baseball return to Sydney, several games had sold out well in advance of their scheduled dates, including the season opener.

As of 2025, the Blue Sox are the only founding ABL team to never appear in or win the Claxton Shield.

== History ==
=== Formation ===
The creation of the ABL was announced at a press conference on the Gold Coast, at the Palm Meadows Baseball Complex, site of the Major League Baseball Australia Academy Program in July 2009. Though there was speculation at the time that there may be as many as 10 teams in the competition, with teams possibly from New Zealand and Asia, it wasn't until two months later that the number and location of teams was announced: Sydney would have one of five confirmed teams, with Canberra eventually being successful in bidding for the sixth team.

Names and colour schemes for each of the teams were determined through a competition launched in December 2009 called "Name Your ABL Team". Fans were asked to select from one of four options for the team's name or provide their own alternative. Though the four options provided for the Sydney team were "Sydney Sting", "Sydney Rocks", "Sydney Surf" and "Sydney Bluewave", the name announced in August 2010 was "Sydney Blue Sox", with Sydney's colour being the blue traditionally associated with New South Wales sporting teams. The Blue Sox would have Blacktown Olympic Park as their home ground, which had been the New South Wales Patriots home in the Claxton Shield the previous three seasons.

On 19 August 2010, Blue Sox signed Glenn Williams as manager for the 2010–11 season. Williams had last played baseball in Australia with the Patriots in the 2007 Claxton Shield, and played 13 games for the Minnesota Twins during the 2005 Major League Baseball season, becoming the 17th Australian-born player to reach the Major Leagues. The following month, Eddie Bray was appointed as general manager of the club, having held the same role with the Patriots in the 2010 Claxton Shield.

=== Inaugural season ===
Sydney's initial roster included two players—Chris Oxspring and Koo Dae-Sung—and manager Glenn Williams with Major League experience. With Oxspring also taking on the role of pitching coach, and a number of players with experience from international league's including Nippon Professional Baseball and Korea Baseball Organization, and the late addition to the roster of active Major Leaguers Trent Oeltjen and Rich Thompson, Sydney had the most experienced roster of any of the teams in the league.

The Blue Sox hosted the inaugural game of the league, playing against the Canberra Cavalry at BOP, which they won 1–0. They would go on to sweep the opening series, the first of three series sweeps they would accomplish through the season, the others two against the Adelaide Bite at home, and the Perth Heat in Perth at Baseball Park. Ironically, immediately after sweeping the Heat, Perth swept Sydney at BOP.

Sydney clinched first place in the league in their final game, beating the Cavalry at Narrabundah Ballpark in Canberra. They led Perth by half a game, with Adelaide a further game back, and the Melbourne Aces six games behind the Blue Sox. Finishing first earned Sydney the right to host the major semi-final series, in addition to a second chance if they lost the series, against the second-place Heat. Perth maintained the perfect season record in Sydney, sweeping the series and qualifying directly to the championship series.

The Bite, having defeated the Aces in the minor semi-final series faced the Blue Sox in the preliminary final series at BOP. Game one of the series featured Sydney starting pitcher David Welch, who threw the league's first no-hitter. This would be Sydney's only win of the postseason, as Adelaide came back and won the series 2–1.

Sydney players took three of the six season awards announced by the league:

- Koo Dae-Sung – Reliever of the Year
- Trent Schmutter – Rookie of the Year
- David Welch – Pitcher of the Year

== Season records ==
Postseason
PF	Preliminary final
MaSF	Major semi-final
MiSF	Minor semi-final

Awards
POY	Pitcher of the Year
REL	Reliever of the Year
ROY	Rookie of the Year
GG	Golden Glove

Season records
ABL Season	Team Season	Regular Season Results					Postseason	Awards
ABL Season	Team Season	Finish	Won	Lost	Pct.	GB	Postseason	Awards
2010–11	2010–11	1st	24	15	.615	—	Lost MaSF series (Perth Heat 2–0); Lost PF series (Adelaide Bite 2–1)	Koo Dae-Sung (REL); Trent Schmutter (ROY); David Welch (POY)
2011–12	2011–12	4th	20	25	.444	14	Won MiSF series (Adelaide Bite 3–1); Lost PF series (Melbourne Aces 3–2)	Aidan Francis (ROY)
2012–13	2012–13	2nd	26	19	.578	0.5	Lost PF series (Perth Heat 2–0)	
2013–14	2013–14	2nd	23	23	.500	9.0	Lost PF series (Canberra Cavalry 2–1)	
2014–15	2014–15	3rd	22	24	.478	9.0	Lost PF series (Perth Heat 0–0)	
2015–16	2015–16	4th	26	29	.473	10.5		
2016–17	2016–17	5th	14	26	.350	10.5		
2017–18	2017–18	5th	13	27	.350	10.5		
2018–19	2018–19	2nd	25	15	.625	---	Lost PF series (Perth Heat 2–1)	Gift Ngoepe (GG) Todd van Steensel (REL)
2019–20	2019–20	7th	13.5	23.5	.413	5.0		
2020–21	2020–21	5th	6	18	.429	6.0	Lost PF series (Canberra Cavalry 3–2)	Gift Ngoepe (GG) Todd van Steensel (REL)
2021–22	2020–21	ABL season cancelled due to COVID-19						
2022–23	2022–23	4th	12.5	27	.316	17.25		
2023–24	2023–24	6th	11	29	.275	18.0		
2024–25	2022–23	1st	24	16	.600	---	Lost PF series (Canberra Cavalry 7–4)	
2025-26	2025-26	1st	24	14	.632	---	Lost Final to Adelaide Giants.	Eric Rataczak (HELMS Award Winner) Landen Bourassa (Pitching Champion) Brooke Knight (Manager of the Year) Stuart Scott (Administrator of the Year)

Overall record
	Won	Lost	Pct.
Regular season record	169.5	182.5	.482
Postseason record	7	14	.333
All-time record	176.5	196.5	.473

== Notable players ==
- Gavin Fingleson, South African-born Australian, Olympic silver medalist baseball player
- Rhys Hoskins
- David Kandilas
- Jacob May
- Chris Oxspring
- Gift Ngoepe
- Zach Penprase
- Brad Thomas
- Manny Ramirez
- Lachlan Wells

== See also ==
- List of current Australian Baseball League team rosters
