= Empire Ballpark =

Baseball stadium in Thornlie, Western Australia

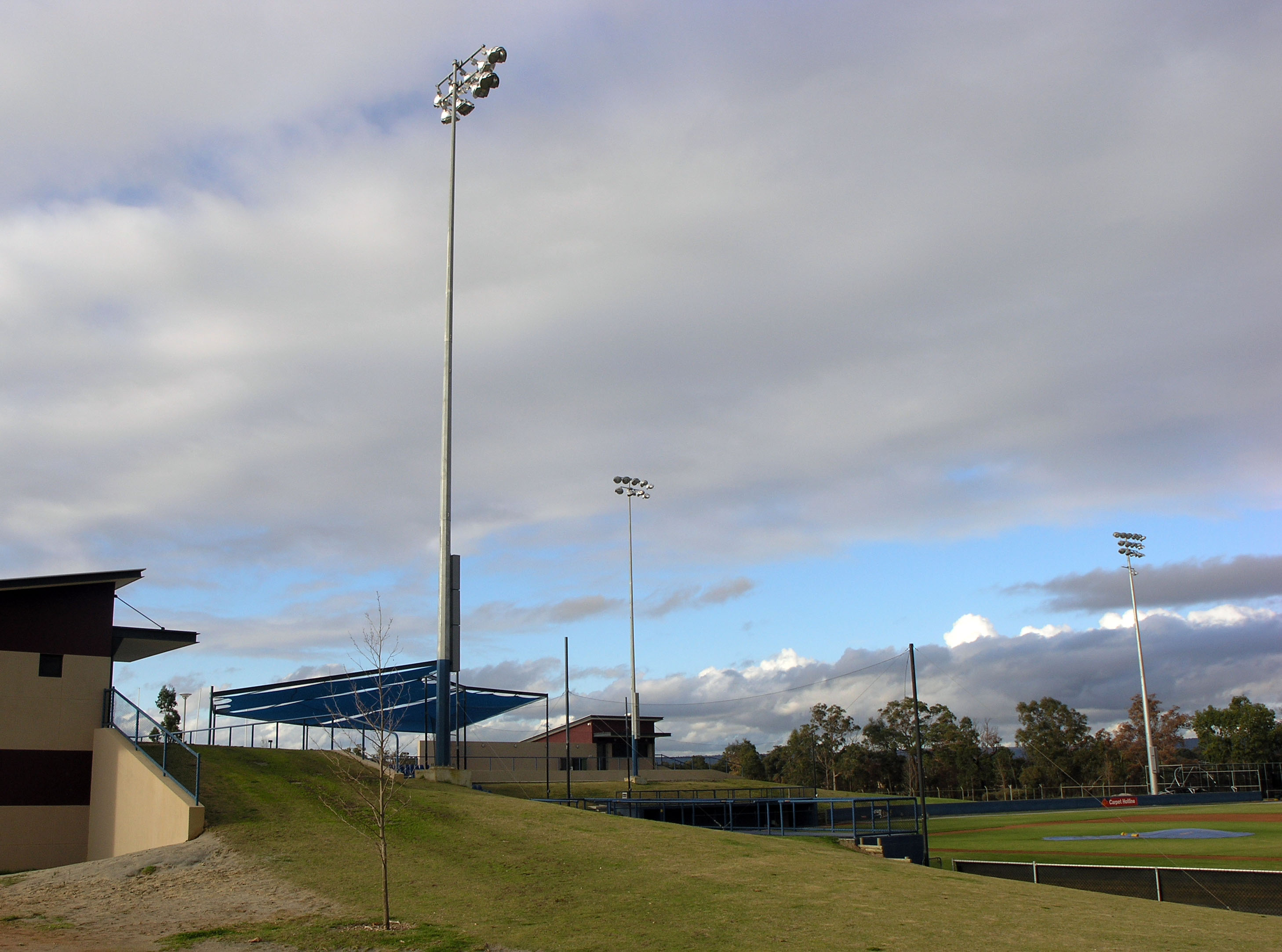
- Baseball Park, 2007
- Interactive map of Empire Ballpark
- Former names: Baseball Park (2004–2010); Barbagallo Ballpark (2010–2015); Perth Harley-Davidson Ballpark (2017-2020)
- Location: Corner of Wilfred and Nicholson roads, Thornlie, Perth, Western Australia
- Coordinates: 32°3′30″S 115°56′12″E
- Owner: Government of Western Australia
- Operator: Baseball WA
- Capacity: 3000
- Surface: Semi-skinned gravel, with grass
- Field size: Left: 102 m (335 ft); Left-centre: 113 m (370 ft); Centre: 122 m (400 ft); Right-centre: 113 m (370 ft); Right: 102 m (335 ft)

Construction
- Opened: 2004
- Renovated: 2019
- Cost: A$2.7 million (build); A$200,000 (2007 upgrade); A$1.7 million (2016–2017: stage 1); A$6 million (2017–2019: stage 2)

Tenants
- Baseball WA; Perth Heat

Empire Ballpark is a baseball stadium in Perth, Australia. It was built in 2004, with a seating capacity of 1500 and standing room for a further 2500. This is the first baseball-exclusive stadium in Perth since the demolition of Parry Field in the mid-1990s. Baseball Park was the venue of the 2007 Claxton Shield, which ran from 19 to 27 January 2007. The facility was known as Barbagallo Ballpark between mid-2010 and mid-2015, until Perth Harley-Davidson purchased the naming rights to the stadium in 2017 for a 3-year deal. In December of 2020, the Perth Heat announced a naming rights deal with Empire Capital Partners for the then upcoming 2020–21 Australian Baseball League season.

== Stage 2 development ==
Baseball Park underwent further expansion in 2007 in preparation for a new Australian Baseball League (ABL), which was originally intended to start in late 2007. The upgrades provided increased corporate facilities and public seating. In 2010, the facility underwent further upgrades between the end of the 2009–2010 Claxton Shield season and the start of the ABL, which began in November 2010. The upgrades included a new, permanent, terraced bar, a batter's eye in centre field and an electronic scoreboard, while the outfield fences were also brought in to help fix the shortage of home runs at the venue in previous Claxton Shield seasons. Furthermore, an enclosed members area, numbered seats, an improved playing surface, upgraded corporate boxes, fences around the terraces and a new gameday office building were part of the improvements.
