= 2024 WBSC Premier12 rosters =

The following is a list of squads for each nation competing in the 2024 WBSC Premier12. Participating nations had to submit their final 28-man rosters no later than 10 October 2024. WBSC rules require teams to carry at least 13 pitchers and two catchers in their squads. If applicable, the club listed is the club a player was with at the start of the tournament.

Key

P	Pitcher
C	Catcher
IF	Infielder
OF	Outfielder

== Group A ==
=== Mexico ===
Mexico announced their squad on 10 October 2024 and their final squad on 9 November 2024.

Manager: Benji Gil

Coaches: Alfredo Amézaga (third base), Javier Colina (bench), Jacob Cruz (hitting), Manny del Campo (bullpen), Jonathan Jones (first base), José Silva (pitching)

Pos.	No.	Player	Date of birth (age)	Bats	Throws	Club
P	29	R. J. Alaniz	14 June 1991 (aged 33)	R	R	Acereros de Monclova
P	14	Manny Bañuelos	13 March 1991 (aged 33)	R	L	Tomateros de Culiacán
P	49	Jesús Cruz	15 April 1995 (aged 29)	R	R	Leones de Yucatán
P	58	Edwin Fierro	30 August 1993 (aged 31)	R	R	Diablos Rojos del México
P	24	César Gómez	9 July 1998 (aged 26)	L	R	Houston Astros (minors)
P	81	Victor González	16 November 1995 (aged 28)	L	L	Free agent
P	54	Jeff Ibarra	18 August 1987 (aged 37)	L	L	Algodoneros de Unión Laguna
P	45	Luis Fernando Miranda	5 September 1994 (aged 30)	R	R	Guerreros de Oaxaca
P	35	Jorge Pérez	10 July 1993 (aged 31)	R	R	Toros de Tijuana
P	44	Gerardo Reyes	13 May 1993 (aged 31)	R	R	Free agent
P	2	Wilmer Ríos	3 March 1994 (aged 30)	R	R	Acereros de Monclova
P	69	Luis Ángel Rodríguez	10 September 1999 (aged 25)	L	L	Houston Astros (minors)
P	59	Fernando Salas	30 May 1985 (aged 39)	R	R	Olmecas de Tabasco
P	23	Teddy Stankiewicz	25 November 1993 (aged 30)	R	R	Wei Chuan Dragons
P	23	Jake Thompson	31 January 1994 (aged 30)	R	R	Bravos de León
C	3	Tres Barrera	15 September 1994 (aged 30)	R	R	Toros de Tijuana
C	10	Logan Moore	22 August 1990 (aged 34)	L	R	Acereros de Monclova
C	7	Alexis Wilson	13 August 1996 (aged 28)	R	R	Tigres de Quintana Roo
IF	6	Andrés Álvarez	29 March 1997 (aged 27)	R	R	Pittsburgh Pirates (minors)
IF	33	Chris Carter	18 December 1986 (aged 37)	R	R	Acereros de Monclova
IF	28	Phillip Evans	10 September 1992 (aged 32)	R	R	Toros de Tijuana
IF	19	C.J. Hinojosa	15 July 1994 (aged 30)	R	R	Free agent
IF	18	José Rojas	24 February 1993 (aged 31)	L	R	Free agent
IF	13	Alan Trejo	30 May 1996 (aged 28)	R	R	Los Angeles Dodgers (minors)
OF	41	José Gaitán	23 February 1998 (aged 26)	R	R	El Águila de Veracruz
OF	31	Julián Ornelas	28 December 1996 (aged 27)	L	R	Diablos Rojos del México
OF	39	Juan Pérez	1 November 1991 (aged 33)	L	R	Acereros de Monclova
OF	11	Asael Sánchez	4 March 1994 (aged 30)	R	R	Sultanes de Monterrey

=== United States ===
United States announced their squad on 21 October 2024.

Manager: 52 Mike Scioscia

Coaches: 32 LaTroy Hawkins (Bullpen), 16 Ron Roenicke (Bench), 19 Dave Wallace,(Pitching), 15 Dino Ebel (Third base), 4 Jemile Weeks (First base), 5 Rick Eckstein (Hitting)

Pos.	No.	Player	Date of birth (age)	Bats	Throws	Club
P	31	Eric Adler	12 October 2000 (aged 24)	R	R	Glendale Desert Dogs
P	54	Dan Altavilla	8 September 1992 (aged 32)	R	R	Free agent
P	21	Sam Benschoter	17 March 1998 (aged 26)	R	R	Louisville Bats
P	35	Austin Drury	13 August 1997 (aged 27)	L	L	Free agent
P	24	Anthony Gose	10 August 1990 (aged 34)	L	L	Free agent
P	40	Zac Grotz	17 February 1993 (aged 31)	R	R	Acereros de Monclova
P	26	Rich Hill	11 March 1980 (aged 44)	L	L	Free agent
P	23	Casey Lawrence	28 October 1987 (aged 37)	R	R	Free agent
P	27	Antonio Menendez	11 March 1999 (aged 25)	R	R	Montgomery Biscuits
P	39	Zane Mills	4 July 2000 (aged 24)	R	R	Springfield Cardinals
P	55	Spencer Patton	20 February 1988 (aged 36)	R	R	Olmecas de Tabasco
P	34	Darrell Thompson	27 April 1994 (aged 30)	L	L	Free agent
P	12	Touki Toussaint	20 June 1996 (aged 28)	R	R	Free agent
P	49	Austin Vernon	8 February 1999 (aged 25)	R	R	Montgomery Biscuits
P	43	Cam Vieaux	5 December 1993 (aged 30)	L	L	Tecolotes de los Dos Laredos
C	8	Drake Baldwin	28 March 2001 (aged 23)	L	R	Peoria Javelinas
C	25	Willie MacIver	28 October 1996 (aged 28)	R	R	Albuquerque Isotopes
C	28	Chris Okey	29 December 1994 (aged 29)	R	R	Oklahoma City Comets
IF	3	Cam Devanney	13 April 1997 (aged 27)	R	R	Omaha Storm Chasers
IF	18	Tim Elko	27 December 1998 (aged 25)	R	R	Glendale Desert Dogs
IF	2	Termarr Johnson	11 June 2004 (aged 20)	L	R	Scottsdale Scorpions
IF	11	Luke Ritter	15 February 1997 (aged 27)	R	R	Syracuse Mets
IF	1	Matt Shaw	6 November 2001 (aged 23)	R	R	Iowa Cubs
IF	7	Carson Williams	25 June 2003 (aged 21)	S	R	Montgomery Biscuits
OF	22	Justin Crawford	13 January 2004 (aged 20)	L	R	Reading Fightin Phils
OF	6	Chandler Simpson	18 November 2000 (aged 23)	L	R	Montgomery Biscuits
OF	9	Colby Thomas	26 January 2001 (aged 23)	R	R	Las Vegas Aviators
OF	10	Ryan Ward	23 February 1998 (aged 26)	L	R	Oklahoma City Comets

=== Venezuela ===
Venezuela announced their squad on 18 October 2024.

Manager: Omar López

Coaches: Robinson Chirinos, Jorge Córdova, Néstor Corredor, Gerardo Parra, Luis Ramírez, Wilfredo Romero

Pos.	No.	Player	Date of birth (age)	Bats	Throws	Club
P	48	José Álvarez	6 May 1989 (aged 35)	L	L	Toros de Tijuana
P	73	Liarvis Breto	10 April 1993 (aged 31)	L	L	Dorados de Chihuahua
P	54	Max Castillo	4 May 1999 (aged 25)	R	R	Cardenales de Lara
P	67	Enderson Franco	29 November 1992 (aged 31)	R	R	Fubon Guardians
P	85	Pedro García	21 March 1995 (aged 29)	R	R	Tiburones de La Guaira
P	92	Arnaldo Hernández	9 February 1996 (aged 28)	R	R	Tecolotes de los Dos Laredos
P	65	Yohander Méndez	17 January 1995 (aged 29)	L	L	Leones del Caracas
P	63	Oddanier Mosqueda	6 May 1999 (aged 25)	L	L	New York Yankees (minors)
P	46	Ricardo Pinto	20 January 1994 (aged 30)	R	R	Tiburones de La Guaira
P	58	Nivaldo Rodríguez	16 April 1997 (aged 27)	R	R	Fubon Guardians
P	68	Ricardo Rodríguez	31 August 1992 (aged 32)	R	R	El Águila de Veracruz
P	27	Mario Sánchez	31 October 1994 (aged 30)	R	R	Uni-President Lions
P	69	Jesús Vargas	18 August 1998 (aged 26)	R	R	Pericos de Puebla
P	76	Anthony Vizcaya	24 October 1993 (aged 31)	R	R	Navegantes del Magallanes
P	18	Alfredo Zárraga	16 November 2000 (aged 23)	R	R	Tampa Bay Rays (minors)
C	37	Francisco Arcia	14 September 1989 (aged 35)	S	R	Tecolotes de los Dos Laredos
C	36	Carlos Pérez	27 October 1990 (aged 34)	R	R	Oakland Athletics (minors)
C	44	Carlos Pérez	10 September 1996 (aged 28)	R	R	Chicago White Sox (minors)
IF	13	Ehire Adrianza	21 August 1989 (aged 35)	S	R	Free agent
IF	2	Alexi Amarista	6 April 1989 (aged 35)	L	R	Guerreros de Oaxaca
IF	10	Diego Castillo	28 October 1997 (aged 27)	R	R	Minnesota Twins (minors)
IF	6	Dixon Machado	22 February 1992 (aged 32)	R	R	Free agent
IF	4	Jermaine Palacios	19 July 1996 (aged 28)	R	R	Sultanes de Monterrey
IF	14	Hernán Pérez	26 March 1991 (aged 33)	R	R	Cincinnati Reds (minors)
IF	23	David Rodríguez	25 February 1996 (aged 28)	R	R	Tigres de Quintana Roo
OF	31	Ramón Flores	26 March 1992 (aged 32)	L	L	Diablos Rojos del México
OF	30	Ángel Reyes	6 May 1995 (aged 29)	R	R	Rieleros de Aguascalientes
OF	7	Herlis Rodríguez	10 June 1994 (aged 30)	L	L	El Águila de Veracruz

=== Netherlands ===
The Netherlands announced their squad on 21 October 2024.

Manager: 9 Evert-Jan 't Hoen

Coaches: 28 Randolph Oduber (First base), 24 Sidney de Jong (Bench), 44 Ben Thijssen (Third base), 36 Diegomar Markwell (Pitching), 8 Michael Duursma (First base), 32 Bart Hanegraaff

Pos.	No.	Player	Date of birth (age)	Bats	Throws	Club
P	1	Jaydenn Estanista	3 October 2001 (aged 23)	R	R	Jersey Shore BlueClaws
P	21	Dylan Farley	26 December 2001 (aged 22)	L	L	Delta State Statesmen
P	16	Lars Huijer	22 September 1993 (aged 31)	R	R	HCAW
P	27	Ryan Huntington	25 August 1996 (aged 28)	R	L	Curaçao Neptunus
P	33	Kevin Kelly	27 May 1990 (aged 34)	R	R	Sultanes de Monterrey
P	39	Shairon Martis	30 March 1987 (aged 37)	R	R	Curaçao Neptunus
P	10	Eric Mendez	3 December 1999 (aged 24)	R	R	San Marino Baseball Club
P	14	Scott Prins	9 February 2001 (aged 23)	R	R	Ottawa Titans
P	45	J. C. Sulbaran	9 November 1989 (aged 35)	R	R	Curaçao Neptunus
P	17	Kaj Timmermans	8 November 1995 (aged 29)	R	R	HCAW
P	55	Franklin van Gurp	26 October 1995 (aged 29)	R	R	Kufu Hayate Ventures
P	19	Pim Vijfvinkel	7 September 2001 (aged 23)	R	R	Amsterdam Pirates
C	23	Donovan Antonia	13 August 2003 (aged 21)	R	R	Free agent
C	12	Hendrik Clementina	17 June 1997 (aged 27)	R	R	Cardenales de Lara
C	29	Jair van Borkulo	10 July 2002 (aged 22)	R	R	HCAW
IF	41	Dayson Croes	8 October 1999 (aged 25)	L	R	Winnipeg Goldeyes
IF	18	Didi Gregorius	18 February 1990 (aged 34)	L	R	Algodoneros de Unión Laguna
IF	4	Eugene Helder	26 February 1996 (aged 28)	R	R	Fortitudo Bologna
IF	7	Dwayne Kemp	24 February 1988 (aged 36)	S	R	Curaçao Neptunus
IF	13	Juremi Profar	30 January 1996 (aged 28)	R	R	Free agent
IF	6	Jonathan Schoop	15 October 1991 (aged 33)	R	R	Algodoneros de Unión Laguna
IF	15	Sharlon Schoop	15 April 1987 (aged 37)	R	R	Sta. Maria Pirates
IF	3	Stijn van der Meer	1 May 1993 (aged 31)	L	R	Curaçao Neptunus
OF	11	Ray-Patrick Didder	1 October 1994 (aged 30)	R	R	San Antonio Missions
OF	25	Denzel Richardson	7 January 1994 (aged 30)	R	R	Fortitudo Bologna
OF	2	Delano Selassa	25 October 1999 (aged 25)	R	R	HCAW
OF	20	Rushenten Tomsjansen	14 May 2001 (aged 23)	R	R	Grosseto Baseball Club

=== Panama ===
Panama announced their squad on 29 October 2024.

Manager: 17 José Mayorga

Coaches: 18 Dimas Ponce (First base), 12 Luis Caballero (Bench), 28 Cirilo Cumberbatch, 3 Rodrigo Vigil (Hitting) , 26 Ashley Ponce (Third base), 27 Gabriel Luckert (Pitching)

Pos.	No.	Player	Date of birth (age)	Bats	Throws	Club
P	29	Darío Agrazal	28 December 1994 (aged 29)	R	R	Leones de Yucatán
P	25	Alberto Baldonado	1 February 1993 (aged 31)	L	L	Yomiuri Giants
P	51	Jaime Barría	18 July 1996 (aged 28)	R	R	Hanwha Eagles
P	36	Enrique Burgos	23 November 1990 (aged 33)	R	R	Free agent
P	19	Bryan Cáceres	19 February 2000 (aged 24)	R	R	Wilmington Blue Rocks
P	91	Gilberto Chu	19 November 1997 (aged 26)	L	L	Québec Capitales
P	22	Steven Fuentes	4 May 1997 (aged 27)	R	R	Charros de Jalisco
P	15	Miguel Gómez	10 September 2001 (aged 23)	R	R	Wilmington Blue Rocks
P	52	Severino González	28 September 1992 (aged 32)	R	R	Charros de Jalisco
P	41	Alberto Guerrero	13 December 1997 (aged 26)	R	R	Águilas del Zulia
P	7	Kenny Hernández	24 June 1998 (aged 26)	L	L	Pericos de Puebla
P	6	Abdiel Mendoza	19 September 1998 (aged 26)	R	R	New Hampshire Fisher Cats
P	14	Kevin Miranda	14 November 1998 (aged 25)	R	R	New Hampshire Fisher Cats
P	32	Wilfredo Pereira	26 April 1999 (aged 25)	R	R	Springfield Cardinals
P	8	Kevin Rodríguez	13 August 2000 (aged 24)	R	R	Free agent
C	2	Fernando González	2 December 2001 (aged 22)	R	R	Free agent
C	16	Robert Mullen	23 May 1996 (aged 28)	R	R	Free agent
C	9	Mario Sanjur	23 December 1995 (aged 28)	R	R	Free agent
IF	13	Johan Camargo	13 December 1993 (aged 30)	S	R	Free agent
IF	10	Edgar Muñoz	30 October 1991 (aged 33)	R	R	Free agent
IF	20	Carlos Quiroz	30 November 1985 (aged 38)	R	R	Free agent
IF	11	Rubén Tejada	27 October 1989 (aged 35)	R	R	Leones de Yucatán
IF	39	Joshwan Wright	9 November 2000 (aged 24)	R	R	Free agent
OF	89	Luis Castillo	15 May 1989 (aged 35)	S	R	Free agent
OF	24	Rodrigo Orozco	2 April 1995 (aged 29)	S	R	Free agent
OF	99	José Ramos	1 January 2001 (aged 23)	R	R	Tulsa Drillers
OF	23	Abraham Rodríguez	9 March 1999 (aged 25)	L	L	Free agent
OF	21	Jhonny Santos	2 October 1996 (aged 28)	R	R	Free agent

=== Puerto Rico ===
Puerto Rico announced their squad on 14 October 2024.

Manager: 19 Juan González

Coaches: 22 Eduardo Núñez (Third base), 41 Dicky González (Pitching), 42 Eddie González (First base), 14 Juan Carlos Montero (Bullpen), 35 Edgar Pérez (Infield), 66 Alex Cintrón (Bench)

Pos.	No.	Player	Date of birth (age)	Bats	Throws	Club
P	31	Jorge Benítez	2 June 1999 (aged 25)	L	L	Tulsa Drillers
P	51	Jonathan Bermúdez	16 October 1995 (aged 29)	L	L	Free agent
P	33	Osvaldo Berrios	29 November 1999 (aged 24)	R	R	Peoria Chiefs
P	28	Raymond Burgos	29 November 1998 (aged 25)	L	L	Sacramento River Cats
P	2	Ojani Chacón		L	L	Free agent
P	62	Luis Cintrón	15 November 1989 (aged 34)	L	L	Free agent
P	63	Luis Leroy Cruz	10 September 1990 (aged 34)	L	L	Free agent
P	65	José Figueroa	30 June 1999 (aged 25)	R	R	Free agent
P	34	Jason Garcia	21 November 1992 (aged 31)	R	R	Free agent
P	37	Agnel Miranda	4 May 2002 (aged 22)	R	R	Free agent
P	60	Rubén Ramírez	14 November 1998 (aged 25)	R	R	Free agent
P	20	Dereck Rodríguez	5 June 1992 (aged 32)	R	R	Charros de Jalisco
P	39	Luis Rodríguez	28 June 2001 (aged 23)	R	R	Free agent
P	14	Andrés Santiago	26 October 1989 (aged 35)	R	R	Free agent
C	29	Juan Centeno	16 November 1989 (aged 34)	L	R	Free agent
C	9	Luis Hernández	17 July 2002 (aged 22)	R	R	Indiana State Sycamores
C	32	Víctor Torres	29 July 2000 (aged 24)	R	R	Wisconsin Timber Rattlers
IF	40	Sabin Ceballos	17 August 2002 (aged 22)	R	R	Eugene Emeralds
IF	61	Randal Díaz	20 May 2003 (aged 21)	R	R	Indiana State Sycamores
IF	64	Edrick Félix	14 January 2002 (aged 22)	R	R	ACL White Sox
IF	26	John Montes	27 August 2001 (aged 23)	L	R	South Florida Bulls
IF	44	Yadiel Rivera	2 May 1992 (aged 32)	R	R	Free agent
IF	18	Shawn Ross	30 September 1999 (aged 25)	R	R	Greensboro Grasshoppers
OF	12	Carlos Cortés	30 June 1997 (aged 27)	L	S	Syracuse Mets
OF	36	Jaime Ferrer	27 December 2002 (aged 21)	R	R	Fort Myers Mighty Mussels
OF	25	Ezequiel Pagán	8 July 2000 (aged 24)	L	R	Tennessee Smokies
OF	46	Javier Vaz	22 September 2000 (aged 24)	L	R	Omaha Storm Chasers
OF	17	Edgardo Villegas	28 April 2003 (aged 21)	L	L	Miami Hurricanes

== Group B ==
=== Japan ===
Japan announced their squad on 9 October 2024.

Manager: Hirokazu Ibata

Coaches: Makoto Kaneko, Yoshinori Murata, Eishin Soyogi, Yoshiyuki Kamei, Kazuki Yoshimi

Pos.	No.	Player	Date of birth (age)	Bats	Throws	Club
P	46	Shoma Fujihira	21 September 1998 (aged 26)	R	R	Tohoku Rakuten Golden Eagles
P	21	Takahisa Hayakawa	6 July 1998 (aged 26)	L	L	Tohoku Rakuten Golden Eagles
P	17	Hiromi Itoh	31 August 1997 (aged 27)	L	R	Hokkaido Nippon-Ham Fighters
P	57	Koki Kitayama	10 April 1999 (aged 25)	R	R	Hokkaido Nippon-Ham Fighters
P	15	Taisei Ota	29 June 1999 (aged 25)	R	R	Yomiuri Giants
P	35	Hiroto Saiki	7 November 1998 (aged 26)	R	R	Hanshin Tigers
P	50	Tatsuya Shimizu	3 November 1999 (aged 25)	R	R	Chunichi Dragons
P	16	Chihiro Sumida	20 August 1999 (aged 25)	L	L	Saitama Seibu Lions
P	49	Shōta Suzuki	7 September 1998 (aged 26)	L	L	Chiba Lotte Marines
P	56	Sora Suzuki	19 August 1996 (aged 28)	L	L	Tohoku Rakuten Golden Eagles
P	19	Hiroto Takahashi	9 August 2002 (aged 22)	R	R	Chunichi Dragons
P	20	Shosei Togo	4 April 2000 (aged 24)	R	R	Yomiuri Giants
P	60	Rikuto Yokoyama	5 August 2001 (aged 23)	R	R	Chiba Lotte Marines
C	22	Yūto Koga	10 September 1999 (aged 25)	R	R	Saitama Seibu Lions
C	31	Shōgo Sakakura	29 May 1998 (aged 26)	L	R	Hiroshima Toyo Carp
C	32	Toshiya Satoh	27 January 1998 (aged 26)	R	R	Chiba Lotte Marines
IF	6	Sosuke Genda	16 February 1993 (aged 31)	L	R	Saitama Seibu Lions
IF	51	Kaito Kozono	7 June 2000 (aged 24)	L	R	Hiroshima Toyo Carp
IF	24	Kotaro Kurebayashi	7 February 2002 (aged 22)	R	R	Orix Buffaloes
IF	23	Ryoya Kurihara	4 July 1996 (aged 28)	L	R	Fukuoka SoftBank Hawks
IF	2	Shugo Maki	21 April 1998 (aged 26)	R	R	Yokohama DeNA BayStars
IF	25	Kazuma Okamoto	30 June 1996 (aged 28)	R	R	Yomiuri Giants
IF	4	Naoki Yoshikawa	8 February 1995 (aged 29)	L	R	Yomiuri Giants
OF	5	Ryota Isobata	27 November 1998 (aged 25)	L	R	Hokkaido Nippon-Ham Fighters
OF	66	Chusei Mannami	7 April 2000 (aged 24)	R	R	Hokkaido Nippon-Ham Fighters
OF	1	Shota Morishita	14 August 2000 (aged 24)	R	R	Hanshin Tigers
OF	7	Keita Sano	28 November 1994 (aged 29)	L	R	Yokohama DeNA BayStars
OF	8	Ryōsuke Tatsumi	27 December 1995 (aged 28)	L	R	Tohoku Rakuten Golden Eagles

=== South Korea ===
South Korea announced their squad on 8 November 2024.

Manager: Ryu Joong-il

Coaches: Pitching Choi Il-eon

Pos.	No.	Player	Date of birth (age)	Bats	Throws	Club
P		Choi Ji-min	10 September 2003 (aged 21)	L	L	Kia Tigers
P		Choi Seung-yong	11 May 2001 (aged 23)	L	L	Doosan Bears
P		Gwak Been	28 May 1999 (aged 25)	R	R	Doosan Bears
P		Im Chan-kyu	20 November 1992 (aged 31)	R	R	LG Twins
P		Jung Hai-young	23 August 2001 (aged 23)	R	R	Kia Tigers
P		Jo Byeong-hyeon	8 May 2002 (aged 22)	R	R	SSG Landers
P		Kim Seo-hyeon	31 May 2004 (aged 20)	R	R	Hanwha Eagles
P		Kim Taek-yeon	3 May 2005 (aged 19)	R	R	Doosan Bears
P		Ko Young-pyo	16 September 1991 (aged 33)	R	R	KT Wiz
P		Kwak Do-gyu	12 April 2004 (aged 20)	L	L	Kia Tigers
P		Lee Young-ha	1 November 1997 (aged 27)	R	R	Doosan Bears
P		Park Yeong-hyun	11 October 2003 (aged 21)	R	R	KT Wiz
P		So Hyeong-jun	16 September 2001 (aged 23)	R	R	KT Wiz
P		You Young-chan	7 March 1997 (aged 27)	R	R	LG Twins
C		Kim Hyung-jun	2 November 1999 (aged 25)	R	R	NC Dinos
C		Park Dong-won	7 April 1990 (aged 34)	R	R	LG Twins
IF		Kim Do-yeong	2 October 2003 (aged 21)	R	R	Kia Tigers
IF		Kim Whee-jip	1 January 2002 (aged 22)	R	R	NC Dinos
IF		Kim Young-woong	24 August 2003 (aged 21)	R	L	Samsung Lions
IF		Moon Bo-gyeong	19 July 2000 (aged 24)	R	L	LG Twins
IF		Na Seung-yeup	15 February 2002 (aged 22)	R	L	Lotte Giants
IF		Park Seong-han	30 March 1998 (aged 26)	R	L	SSG Landers
IF		Shin Min-jae	21 January 1996 (aged 28)	R	L	LG Twins
IF		Song Sung-mun	29 August 1996 (aged 28)	R	L	Kiwoom Heroes
OF		Choi Won-jun	23 March 1997 (aged 27)	R	L	Kia Tigers
OF		Hong Chang-ki	21 November 1993 (aged 30)	L	R	LG Twins
OF		Lee Ju-hyeong	5 July 2002 (aged 22)	L	L	Kiwoom Heroes
OF		Yoon Dong-hee	18 September 2003 (aged 21)	R	R	Lotte Giants

=== Chinese Taipei ===
Chinese Taipei (Taiwan) announced their squad on 12 October 2024.

Manager: Tseng Hao-ju

Pos.	No.	Player	Date of birth (age)	Bats	Throws	Club
P	19	Chang Yi	26 February 1994 (aged 30)	R	R	Fubon Guardians
P	59	Chen Kuan-wei	28 October 1996 (aged 28)	R	R	Wei Chuan Dragons
P	17	Chen Kuan-yu	29 October 1990 (aged 34)	L	L	Rakuten Monkeys
P	20	Chen Po-ching	25 October 1998 (aged 26)	L	L	TSG Hawks
P	12	Chiang Kuo-hao	29 December 1997 (aged 26)	R	R	Fubon Guardians
P	71	Chuang Hsin-yen	19 October 2000 (aged 24)	R	R	Rakuten Monkeys
P	39	Huang En-sih	17 May 1996 (aged 28)	L	R	CTBC Brothers
P	69	Huang Tzu-peng	19 March 1994 (aged 30)	L	R	Rakuten Monkeys
P	75	Kuo Chun-lin	2 February 1992 (aged 32)	R	R	Uni-President 7-Eleven Lions
P	18	Lin Kai-wei	19 March 1996 (aged 28)	R	R	Wei Chuan Dragons
P	45	Lin Yu-min	12 July 2003 (aged 21)	L	L	Amarillo Sod Poodles
P	64	Wang Chih-hsuan	5 September 2001 (aged 23)	L	L	Rakuten Monkeys
P	21	Wu Chun-wei	31 December 1998 (aged 25)	R	R	CTBC Brothers
C	27	Lyle Lin	26 June 1997 (aged 27)	R	R	Amarillo Sod Poodles
C	95	Tai Pei-fong	7 January 2000 (aged 24)	L	R	Fubon Guardians
IF	9	Chang Cheng-yu	8 June 2000 (aged 24)	L	R	Wei Chuan Dragons
IF	90	Chiang Kun-yu	4 July 2000 (aged 24)	R	R	CTBC Brothers
IF	85	Chu Yu-hsien	26 November 1991 (aged 32)	R	R	Rakuten Monkeys
IF	4	Giljegiljaw Kungkuan	13 March 1994 (aged 30)	R	R	Wei Chuan Dragons
IF	25	Li Kai-wei	11 September 1997 (aged 27)	L	R	Wei Chuan Dragons
IF	83	Lin Li	1 January 1996 (aged 28)	R	R	Rakuten Monkeys
IF	35	Pan Chieh-kai	3 February 1994 (aged 30)	L	R	Uni-President 7-Eleven Lions
IF	58	Yueh Tung-hua	19 October 1995 (aged 29)	L	R	CTBC Brothers
OF	98	Chen Chen-wei	12 December 1997 (aged 26)	L	R	Rakuten Monkeys
OF	24	Chen Chieh-hsien	7 January 1994 (aged 30)	L	R	Uni-President 7-Eleven Lions
OF	14	Chiu Chih-cheng	26 November 2000 (aged 23)	L	L	Uni-President 7-Eleven Lions
OF	77	Lin An-ko	19 May 1997 (aged 27)	L	L	Uni-President 7-Eleven Lions
OF	32	Tseng Sung-en	8 January 2000 (aged 24)	R	R	CTBC Brothers

=== Cuba ===
Cuba announced their squad on 4 November 2024.

Manager: Armando Johnson
Coaches: 24 José Elosegui (pitching), 9 Armando Ferrer (first base), 37 Humberto Guevara, 46 Orestes Kindelán (hitting), 99 Pedro Luis Lazo (pitching), 45 Juan Manrique, 11 Germán Mesa (bench), 39 Rafael Muñoz (third base)

Pos.	No.	Player	Date of birth (age)	Bats	Throws	Club
P		Frank Álvarez	16 January 1994 (aged 30)	R	R	Chunichi Dragons (minors)
P		Raymond Figueredo	19 June 1998 (aged 26)	R	R	Industriales
P		Geonel Gutiérrez	10 April 1994 (aged 30)	L	L	Artemisa
P		Yankiel Gutiérrez	2 January 1996 (aged 28)	R	R	Sancti Spíritus
P		Pavel Hernández	2 December 1996 (aged 27)	R	R	Industriales
P		Raidel Martínez	11 October 1996 (aged 28)	R	R	Chunichi Dragons
P		Frank Medina	1 October 1987 (aged 37)	R	R	Pinar del Río
P		Liván Moinelo	8 December 1995 (aged 28)	L	L	Fukuoka SoftBank Hawks
P		Yusniel Padrón	12 November 1997 (aged 26)	R	R	Québec Capitales
P		Leodán Reyes	15 February 2000 (aged 24)	R	R	Industriales
P		Darío Sarduy	12 November 2005 (aged 18)	L	L	Fukuoka SoftBank Hawks (minors)
P		Andy Vargas	21 June 1999 (aged 25)	R	R	Industriales
P		Yoennis Yera	18 October 1989 (aged 35)	L	L	Olmecas de Tabasco
C		Andy Cosme	6 January 1994 (aged 30)	R	R	Artemisa
C		Andrys Pérez	9 February 2001 (aged 23)	R	R	Matanzas
C		Rafael Viñales	1 July 1992 (aged 32)	R	R	Las Tunas
IF		Erisbel Arruebarrena	25 March 1990 (aged 34)	R	R	Matanzas
IF		Roberto Baldoquín	14 May 1994 (aged 30)	R	R	Las Tunas
IF		Ariel Martínez	28 May 1996 (aged 28)	R	R	Hokkaido Nippon-Ham Fighters
IF		Yoán Moncada	27 May 1995 (aged 29)	R	S	Free agent
IF		Yadil Mujica	11 January 1985 (aged 39)	L	R	Matanzas
IF		Cristián Rodríguez	31 March 2002 (aged 22)	R	R	Chunichi Dragons
IF		Jean Walters	13 August 2001 (aged 23)	S	R	Amarillo Sod Poodles
OF		Lázaro Armenteros	22 May 1999 (aged 25)	R	R	Free agent
OF		Alfredo Despaigne	17 June 1986 (aged 38)	R	R	Granma
OF		Yoelkis Guibert	29 August 1994 (aged 30)	L	L	Santiago de Cuba
OF		Roel Santos	15 September 1987 (aged 37)	L	L	Olmecas de Tabasco
OF		Yadir Drake	12 April 1990 (aged 34)	R	R	Leones de Yucatán

=== Dominican Republic ===
Dominican Republic announced their squad on 6 November 2024.

Manager: César Martín

Coaches: Bench Danny Solano, Pitching Ervin Santana, Third base Ramón Santiago, First base Anderson Hernández, Hitting Ronny Paulino, Bullpen José Canó

Pos.	No.	Player	Date of birth (age)	Bats	Throws	Club
P		Diego Castillo	18 January 1994 (aged 30)	R	R	Free agent
P		Robert Corniel	23 June 1995 (aged 29)	R	R	Hiroshima Toyo Carp
P		Henry Henry	17 December 1998 (aged 25)	R	R	Brooklyn Cyclones
P		Jorge Juan	6 March 1999 (aged 25)	R	R	Mississippi Braves
P		Franklyn Kilomé	25 June 1995 (aged 29)	R	R	Free agent
P		Víctor López	2 September 1999 (aged 25)	R	R	Free agent
P		Gerald Ogando	28 July 2000 (aged 24)	R	R	Free agent
P		Héctor Pérez	6 June 1996 (aged 28)	R	R	Uni-President 7-Eleven Lions
P		Wily Peralta	8 May 1989 (aged 35)	R	R	Gigantes del Cibao
P		Wilber Pérez	3 November 1997 (aged 27)	R	R	Free agent
P		Dionys Rodríguez	3 September 2000 (aged 24)	L	R	Peoria Chiefs
P		Joely Rodríguez	14 November 1991 (aged 32)	L	L	Free agent
P		Luis Vargas	2 May 2002 (aged 22)	R	R	Rome Emperors
C		Daneurys de la Cruz	27 April 2001 (aged 23)	R	R	Free agent
C		Randy Florentino	5 July 2000 (aged 24)	R	R	Free agent
C		Frank Rodríguez	28 September 2001 (aged 23)	R	R	Great Lakes Loons
IF		Arismendy Alcántara	29 October 1991 (aged 33)	S	R	Free agent
IF		Andretty Cordero	3 May 1997 (aged 27)	R	R	Águilas Cibaeñas
IF		Michael de León	14 January 1997 (aged 27)	S	R	Tigres del Licey
IF		José Devers	7 December 1999 (aged 24)	L	R	Free agent
IF		Kelvin Gutiérrez	28 August 1994 (aged 30)	R	R	Gigantes del Cibao
IF		Alen Hanson	22 October 1992 (aged 32)	S	R	Conspiradores de Querétaro
IF		Rainer Núñez	4 December 2000 (aged 23)	R	R	New Hampshire Fisher Cats
OF		Micker Adolfo	11 September 1996 (aged 28)	R	R	Free agent
OF		Ricardo Céspedes	24 August 1997 (aged 27)	L	L	Piratas de Campeche
OF		Pedro González	27 October 1997 (aged 27)	R	R	Free agent
OF		Luis Mieses	31 May 2000 (aged 24)	L	L	Frisco RoughRiders

=== Australia ===
Australia announced their squad on 9 October 2024.

Manager: Dave Nilsson

Coaches: Pitching Jim Bennett, Bullpen Graeme Lloyd, Hitting Chris Adamson, Josh Spence, Shayne Watson, Damian Shanahan, Will Bradley

Pos.	No.	Player	Date of birth (age)	Bats	Throws	Club
P		Tim Atherton	7 November 1989 (aged 35)	R	R	Brisbane Bandits
P		Josh Guyer	27 May 1994 (aged 30)	R	R	Sydney Blue Sox
P		Sam Holland	20 February 1994 (aged 30)	R	R	Brisbane Bandits
P		Jon Kennedy	20 September 1989 (aged 35)	L	L	Canberra Cavalry
P		Steven Kent	8 May 1989 (aged 35)	L	L	Canberra Cavalry
P		Daniel McGrath	7 July 1994 (aged 30)	R	L	Free agent
P		Mitch Neunborn	27 June 1997 (aged 27)	R	R	Reading Fightin Phils
P		Warwick Saupold	16 January 1990 (aged 34)	R	R	Free agent
P		Will Sherriff	2 June 2002 (aged 22)	R	L	Perth Heat
P		Lewis Thorpe	23 November 1995 (aged 28)	R	L	Dorados de Chihuahua
P		Blake Townsend	5 April 2001 (aged 23)	L	L	Altoona Curve
P		Todd Van Steensel	14 January 1991 (aged 33)	R	R	Free agent
P		Luke Wilkins	27 December 1989 (aged 34)	R	R	Amsterdam Pirates
P		Coen Wynne	25 January 1999 (aged 25)	R	R	Sydney Blue Sox
C		Ryan Battaglia	29 June 1992 (aged 32)	R	R	Brisbane Bandits
C		Alex Hall	8 June 1999 (aged 25)	S	R	Perth Heat
C		Robbie Perkins	29 May 1994 (aged 30)	R	R	Canberra Cavalry
IF		Travis Bazzana	28 August 2002 (aged 22)	L	R	Lake County Captains
IF		Jake Bowey	16 July 1996 (aged 28)	L	R	Perth Heat
IF		Jarryd Dale	11 September 2000 (aged 24)	R	R	Free agent
IF		Robbie Glendinning	6 October 1995 (aged 29)	R	R	Free agent
IF		Darryl George	14 March 1993 (aged 31)	R	R	Melbourne Aces
IF		Liam Spence	9 April 1998 (aged 26)	R	R	Sioux Falls Canaries
IF		Rixon Wingrove	23 May 2000 (aged 24)	L	R	Cedar Rapids Kernels
OF		Ulrich Bojarski	15 September 1998 (aged 26)	R	R	Perth Heat
OF		Tim Kennelly	5 December 1986 (aged 37)	R	R	Perth Heat
OF		Solomon Maguire	4 March 2000 (aged 24)	L	R	FCL Pirates
OF		Aaron Whitefield	2 September 1996 (aged 28)	R	R	Sioux Falls Canaries
