= 2018–19 Australian Baseball League rosters =

This is a list of the team rosters for each team for the 2018–19 Australian Baseball League season.

== Adelaide Bite ==
Adelaide Bite roster – 2018–19 ABL
Active roster		Reassigned Players	Coaching staff
Pitchers Right-handed pitchers: 48 (Australia) Jackson Brebner-Russ; 32 (United States) Ryan Chaffee; 41 (Australia) Tom Fitzgerald; 9 (Australia) Michael Gahan; 13 (United States) Kurt Heyer; 20 (Japan) Tohru Kikue; 37 (Australia) Greg Mosel; 35 (United States) Jorge Perez; 27 (Germany) Markus Solbach; 34 (United States) Jared Wilson; Left-handed pitchers: 17 (Australia) Wilson Lee; 43 (Japan) Ryo Takeuchi	Catchers: 6 (Australia) Mitchell Edwards; 38 (China) Bruce Wang; Infielders: 28 (Australia) Jordan McArdle; 66 (Australia) Todd McDonald; 16 (Australia) Curtis Mead; 3 (United States) Mikey Reynolds; 22 (United States) Nick Shumpert; 26 (Australia) Stefan Welch; Outfielders: 12 (United States) Michael Gettys; 5 (Australia) Angus Roeger; 1 (Australia) Aaron Whitefield	Pitchers: 18 (Australia) Nick Hutchings; Infielders: 25 (Australia) Nathan VanDerLinden; Catchers: 33 (United States) Ryan January	Manager: 30 (Australia) Chris Adamson; Coaches: 23 (Australia) Michael Dunn; 13 (Australia) Scott Gladstone; 57 (Australia) Luke Prokopec; : 7-day disabled list
17 November 2018.

== Auckland Tuatara ==
Auckland Tuatara roster – 2018–19 ABL
Active roster		Reassigned Players	Coaching staff
Pitchers Right-handed pitchers: 46 (New Zealand) Jimmy Boyce; 19 (United States) Josh Collmenter; 17 (Japan) Yuki Harada; 33 (Australia) Mitchell Hughson; 24 (New Zealand) Elliot Johnstone; 34 (Canada) Brandon Marklund; 28 (Canada) Scott Richmond; 21 (Taiwan) Chen Yu-Hsuan; Left-handed pitchers: 32 (New Zealand) Matt Boyce; 36 (New Zealand) Scott Cone; 4 (Japan) Taki Tashiro; 31 (Australia) Matt Wilson	Catchers: 35 (New Zealand) Beau Te Wera Bishop; 55 (Taiwan) Kuo Chun-Wei; Infielders: 9 (New Zealand) Tyrone Boaler; 3 (New Zealand) Luke Hansen; 14 (United States) Kris Richards; 27 (United States) Taylor Snyder; 18 (United States) Nick Tanielu; 8 (Taiwan) Tsai Yi-Hsuan; Outfielders: 11 (United States) Max Brown; 6 (United States) Zach Clark; 52 (China) Xu Guiyuan; 5 (United States) Eric Jenkins; 15 (New Zealand) Daniel Lamb-Hunt	Pitchers: 39 (United States) John Holdzkom; 9 (New Zealand) Duncan Izaaks; 20 (Japan) Tomohito Sakai; 28 (Japan) Atsuki Taneichi; Infielders: 4 (Japan) Taiga Hirasawa; 2 (New Zealand) Ayrton Laird; 43 (New Zealand) Andrew Marck; Outfielders Catchers: 50 (Japan) Taka Kaneko; 16 (United States) Jerry Lacayo	Manager: 13 (United States) Steve Mintz; Coaches: 22 (United States) Darren Bragg; -- (United States) D. J. Carrasco; -- (New Zealand) Daniel Tan; 23 (Taiwan) Cola Yeh; : 7-day disabled list
27 December 2018.

== Brisbane Bandits ==
Brisbane Bandits roster – 2018–19 ABL
Active roster		Reassigned Players	Coaching staff
Pitchers Right-handed pitchers: 27 (Australia) Tim Atherton; 36 (South Africa) Justin Erasmus; 40 (Australia) Samuel Holland; 37 (Taiwan) Ko-Chien Lin; 11 (United States) Cameron McVey; 19 (Australia) Rhys Niit; 44 (Australia) Ryan Searle; 34 (Australia) Matt Timms; 48 (Netherlands) Loek van Mil; Left-handed pitchers: 22 (Australia) Travis Blackley; 28 (United States) Ryan Bollinger; 7 (United States) Ken Frosch	Catchers: 29 (Australia) Ryan Battaglia; 23 (Cuba) Daniel De La Calle; 12 (Australia) Jay Myers; Infielders: 6 (Canada) T.J. Bennett; 51 (Taiwan) Hsu Chi-hung; 3 (Australia) Wade Dutton; 10 (Australia) Mitchell Ellis; 32 (Germany) Donald Lutz; 15 (Australia) Jacob Nilsson; 43 (Australia) David Sutherland; 16 (Australia) Logan Wade; Outfielders: 17 (Australia) Andrew Campbell; 2 (Australia) Daniel Nilsson; 8 (Australia) Tyson Zamora	Pitchers: 35 (Australia) Drew Naylor; -- (Australia) Lewis Thorpe; Catchers	Manager: 14 (Australia) Dave Nilsson; Coaches: 33 (United States) Jim Bennett; 24 (Australia) Adrian Lamb; : 7-day disabled list
17 November 2018.

== Canberra Cavalry ==
Canberra Cavalry roster – 2018–19 ABL
Active roster		Reassigned Players	Coaching staff
Pitchers Right-handed pitchers: 3 (United States) J.R. Bunda; 22 (Australia) Steven Chambers; 51 (Japan) Yuki Kuniyoshi; 33 (United States) Zech Lemond; 44 (Australia) Jason Lott; 20 (Australia) Josh Warner; Left-handed pitchers: 8 (United States) Frank Gailey; 23 (Australia) Steven Kent; 7 (United States) Kyle Kinman; 34 (Australia) Grant Piccoli	Catchers: 11 (Australia) Kyle Perkins; 9 (Australia) Robbie Perkins; Infielders: 6 (Australia) Logan Kingham; 1 (Venezuela) Justin Lopez; 25 (United States) Craig Massey; 2 (Venezuela) Kelvin Melean; 45 (Australia) Boss Moanaroa; 4 (Australia) Cam Warner; 24 (United States) Zach Wilson; Outfielders: 10 (Japan) Kōki Aoyagi; 27 (Australia) David Kandilas	Pitchers: -- (Japan) Shōta Imanaga; -- (Japan) Tomoya Mikami; Outfielders: -- (Canada) Michael Crouse; 52 (Australia) Moko Moanaroa; Catchers: 19 (Australia) Nick Hosie	Manager: 28 (Australia) Keith Ward; Coaches: -- (Dominican Republic) Felipe Blanco; 18 (Australia) Michael Collins; -- (United States) Brian Grening; : 7-day disabled list
17 November 2018.

== Geelong-Korea ==
Geelong-Korea roster – 2018–19 ABL
Active roster		Reassigned Players	Coaching staff
Pitchers Right-handed pitchers: 17 (South Korea) Na-On Gil; 39 (South Korea) Jin-Yong Jang; 93 (South Korea) Byeong-Geun Kim; 46 (South Korea) Jin-Woo Kim; 11 (South Korea) Hwi Kwon; 50 (South Korea) Jae-Gon Lee; 22 (South Korea) Sang-Hak Lee; 21 (South Korea) Ji-Woong Park; Left-handed pitchers: 52 (South Korea) Ki-Hoon Ryu	Catchers: 23 (South Korea) Sung-Gu Han; 44 (South Korea) Tae-Joon Lim; 26 (South Korea) Seung-Won Shin; Infielders: 16 (South Korea) Han-Gyeol Joh; 62 (South Korea) Seung-Hun Kim; 5 (South Korea) Dae-Gun Kook; 7 (South Korea) Joo-Ho Lee; 10 (South Korea) Yong-Wook Lee; 1 (South Korea) Hwi-Yeon Park; Outfielders: 9 (South Korea) Min-Do Jang; 47 (South Korea) Kwang-Min Kwon; 8 (South Korea) Hak-Jun Noh; 34 (South Korea) Jee-Ho Suh	Pitchers: 28 (South Korea) Jin-Sun Bae; 19 (South Korea) Hwa-Yeong Kang	Manager: 15 (South Korea) Dae-Sung Koo; Coaches: 79 (South Korea) Sang-Eun Ha; 86 (South Korea) Yong-Mok Yoo; : 7-day injured list
17 November 2018.

== Melbourne Aces ==
Melbourne Aces roster – 2018–19 ABL
Active roster		Reassigned Players	Coaching staff
Pitchers Right-handed pitchers: 6 (Australia) Luke Abels; 32 (United States) Harrison Cooney; 47 (Australia) Blake Cunningham; 48 (Australia) Jack Enciondo; 22 (United States) Tyler Falwell; 33 (United States) Scott Kuzminsky; 38 (Australia) Ryan Phillips; 29 (Australia) Dushan Ruzic; 35 (Japan) Hayato Takagi; Left-handed pitchers: 20 (Australia) Liam Evans; 19 (Japan) Hiromasa Saito; 54 (Australia) Blake Townsend; 15 (United States) Luke Westphal	Catchers: 13 (Australia) Chris Burke; 11 (Australia) Allan de San Miguel; 12 (United States) Jake Romanski; Infielders: 4 (United States) D.J. Burt; 17 (Australia) Jared Cruz; 2 (Australia) Jarryd Dale; 27 (Australia) Ryan Dale; 41 (Australia) Darryl George; 16 (Australia) Luke Hughes; 3 (United States) Mike Walker; Outfielders: 44 (United States) Rudy Martin; 9 (Australia) Oliver McMahon; 7 (United States) Garrison Schwartz	Pitchers: 40 (Australia) Jon Kennedy; 18 (South Korea) Byung-hyun Kim; 30 (Australia) Sam Street; Catchers Infielders Outfielders: 53 (United States) Delmon Young	Manager: 24 (Australia) Jon Deeble; Coaches: 8 (Australia) Damian Shanahan; 23 (Australia) Philip Dale; : 7-day disabled list
17 November 2018.

== Perth Heat ==
Perth Heat roster – 2018–19 ABL
Active roster		Reassigned players	Coaching staff
Pitchers Right-handed pitchers: 1 (United States) Ryan Flores; 31 (Mexico) Robert Garcia; 14 (Australia) Benn Grice; 19 (United States) Nathan Kuchta; 27 (Australia) Cameron Lamb; 37 (Australia) Conor Lourey; 35 (Australia) Scott Mitchinson; 13 (Dominican Republic) Joe Peguero; 30 (Australia) Warwick Saupold; 17 (Australia) Nick Veale; Left-handed pitchers: 20 (Australia) Alex Oehme; 18 (Dominican Republic) Cristopher Sanchez; 26 (Australia) Daniel Schmidt; 36 (Australia) Lachlan Southee	Catchers: 22 (United States) Chris Betts; 10 (Australia) Alex Hall; Infielders: 9 (United States) Chris Clare; 21 (Australia) Adam Courcha; 12 (United States) Tristan Gray; 24 (Australia) Sam Kennelly; 33 (United States) Pete Kozma; 5 (Australia) Jess Williams; Outfielders: 11 (United States) Carl Chester; 23 (Australia) Tim Kennelly	Pitchers: 32 (Australia) Jake Bowey; -- (Australia) Raleigh Pelkonen; -- (Australia) Josh Rawlinson; Catchers: -- (Australia) Joshua Greenham; 7 (Australia) Matt Kennelly; Infielders: -- (Australia) Nick Brooks; 6 (Australia) Robbie Glendinning; -- (United States) Eric Grabe; Outfielders: -- (Australia) Cayden Nicoletto	Manager: 4 (Australia) Andy Kyle; Coaches: 28 (Venezuela) Alberto Bastardo; 23 (Australia) Tim Kennelly; 34 (United States) Rafael Valenzuela; : 7-day disabled list
17 November 2018.

== Sydney Blue Sox ==
Sydney Blue Sox roster – 2018–19 ABL
Active roster		Reassigned Players	Coaching staff
Pitchers Right-handed pitchers: 55 (Australia) Dean Aldridge; 96 (Australia) Nick Eckberg; 33 (United States) Garrett Granitz; 32 (Australia) Todd Grattan; 17 (Australia) Josh Guyer; 41 (United States) Ty'Relle Harris; 90 (United States) Tyler Herr; 91 (Italy) Alex Maestri; 71 (Japan) Shogo Nakashima; 21 (Australia) Todd Van Steensel; 26 (Australia) Luke Wilkins; Left-handed pitchers: 31 (Australia) Craig Anderson; 27 (United States) Nick Fanti	Catchers: 51 (United States) Jack Murphy; Infielders: 79 (Australia) Travis Bazzana; 9 (Australia) Max Brennen; 11 (Australia) Trent D’Antonio; 7 (Netherlands) Dwayne Kemp; 99 (Australia) Jake Levin; 24 (Australia) Zac Shepherd; 44 (Australia) Rixon Taylor-Wingrove; 34 (Australia) Jacob Younis; Outfielders: 45 (Australia) Michael Campbell; 3 (Taiwan) Shen Hao-wei; 78 (Australia) Jaelin Rae; 12 (Australia) Alex Howe	Pitchers: -- (Taiwan) Lo Chia-jen; 13 (Australia) Vaughan Harris; -- (United States) Zack Jones; -- (Venezuela) Kender Villegas; -- (South Korea) Kiho Yun; Catchers: -- (Australia) Caleb Shepherd; Infielders: 14 (Australia) Josh Dean; -- (Australia) Mitch Ellison; -- (South Africa) Gift Ngoepe; Outfielders	Manager: 02 (Australia) Tony Harris; Coaches: 24 (Australia) Jason Dormor; 22 (Australia) Brendan Kingman; 36 (Australia) Brian Murphy; 6 (Australia) Jason Pospishil; 19 (Australia) Mark Shipley; : 7-day disabled list
18 November 2018.
