= List of current Australian Baseball League team rosters =

This is a list of the team rosters for each team in the Australian Baseball League.

== Adelaide Giants ==
Adelaide Giants roster – 2024–25 ABL
Active Roster		Coaching staff
Pitchers Right-handed pitchers: 47 (Canada) James Bradwell; 15 (Australia) Ky Hampton; 18 (Venezuela) Estibenzon Jimenez; 50 (Finland) Konsta Kurikka; 40 (Japan) Makoto Kyomoto; 34 (Australia) Darcy Longstaff; 26 (Australia) Jason Lott; 21 (Australia) Todd Van Steensel; Left-handed pitchers: 44 (Australia) Daniel McGrath; 41 (Brazil) Oscar Nakaoshi; 29 (United States) Matt Osterberg; 54 (Australia) Blake Townsend; 19 (Australia) Lachlan Wells; 42 (Japan) Ryusei Yamada	Catchers: 17 (United States) Lou Albrecht; 28 (Venezuela) Luis Caicuto; Infielders: 1 (United States) Trent Farquhar; 2 (Venezuela) Diego Gonzalez; 12 (Australia) Nic Paparella; 45 (New Zealand) Nikau Pouaka-Grego; 4 (Australia) Liam Spence; 46 (United States) Nick Ward; 52 (Australia) Rixon Wingrove; Outfielders: 25 (Japan) Yuto Akihiro; 10 (United States) Jared Carr; 11 (Australia) Drew Davies; 32 (United States) Niko Hulsizer; 9 (Australia) Briley Knight; 5 (Australia) Jordan McArdle	Manager: 30 (Australia) Chris Adamson; Coaches: 13 (Australia) Josh Tols; 23 (Australia) Michael Dunn; 14 (Australia) Scott Gladstone; 7 (Australia) Nathan Van Der Linden; : 7-day disabled list * denotes development player
Updated 15 December 2022

== Brisbane Bandits ==
Brisbane Bandits roster – 2024-25 ABL
Active Roster		Coaching staff
Pitchers Right-handed pitchers: 39 (Taiwan) Ching-Jung Chao; 34 (Australia) Brodie Cooper-Vassalakis; 1 (Dominican Republic) Natanael Garabitos; 40 (Australia) Sam Holland; 26 (United States) Carter Hope; 31 (Taiwan) Pao-Chi Hsieh; 33 (South Korea) Dae-Ho Kim; 12 (Australia) Conor Laverty; 33 (Taiwan) Chia-Ming Lee; 37 (Australia) Connor MacDonald; 27 (Taiwan) Juhyeok Park; 7 (Australia) Tom Stancic; 6 (Australia) Declan Summerford; 49 (Taiwan) Chieh-Hung Yao; 27 (South Korea) Sun Yeop Yook; Left-handed pitchers: 28 (United States) Ryan Bollinger; 29 (United States) Gunnar Kines; 48 (Taiwan) Tzu-Wei Lin; 11 (Taiwan) Yi Kai Wang	Catchers: 30 (Australia) Jake Burns; 61 (United States) Mike Hart; 32 (South Korea) Hyungchan Um; Infielders: 19 (Australia) Dermot Fritsch; 48 (Taiwan) Namoh Iyang; 0 (Taiwan) Jai-Hong Lin; 42 (Germany) Donald Lutz; 5 (United States) Brennon McNair; 4 (Australia) Will Riley; 9 (Australia) Luke Smith*; 56 (Taiwan) Shiang-He Yang; Outfielders: 31 (Taiwan) Yao-Huang Lin; 10 (Canada) Jacob Robson; 3 (Australia) Alex Skepton; 49 (Taiwan) Chia-Yen Tsai; 11 (Taiwan) Yi-Cheng Wang	Manager: 25 (Australia) Matthew Roxburgh; Coaches: 24 (Australia) Aaron Applefield; 22 (Australia) Trent Durrington; 41 (Australia) Russel Teichmann; : 7-day disabled list * denotes development player
14 January 2021.

== Perth Heat ==
Perth Heat roster – 2020–21 ABL
Active roster		Reassigned players	Coaching staff
Pitchers Right-handed pitchers: 13 (Canada) Nick Alexiou; 15 (Australia) Tom Bailey; 38 (United States) Nate Gercken; 18 (United States) Zac Reininger; 27 (United States) Alan Strong; 28 (United States) Beau Sulser; 9 (Australia) Maddux Stivey; 34 (South Africa) Dylan Unsworth; 35 (Australia) Jett Davis; Left-handed pitchers: 31 (Australia) Alex Oehme*; 26 (Australia) Daniel Schmidt; 21 (Australia) Will Sherriff; 36 (Australia) Lochlan Southee	Catchers: 9 (United States) Ford Proctor; 10 (Australia) Alex Hall; Infielders: 6 (Australia) Robbie Glendinning; 24 (Australia) Sam Kennelly; 39 (Dominican Republic) Abiezel Ramirez; 5 (Australia) Jess Williams; Outfielders: 25 (Australia) Ulrich Borjarski; 16 (Australia) Liam Collins; 23 (Australia) Tim Kennelly; 8 (United States) Shane Sasaki; 11 (United States) Grant Witherspoon	Pitchers: 27 (Australia) Cameron Lamb; 30 (Australia) Warwick Saupold; 17 (Australia) Nick Veale; Catchers: 32 (Australia) Jake Bowey; Infielders: 1 (Australia) Byron Armstrong	Coaches: 14 (United States) R.C. Lichtenstein; 12 (United States) Sean Smedley; 3 (Australia) Adam Courcha; 20 (Australia) Mark Pettit; : 7-day disabled list
31 December 2020 * denotes development player

== Sydney Blue Sox ==
Sydney Blue Sox roster – 2023-24 ABL
Active Roster		Development and Reserve Lists	Coaching staff
Pitchers Right-handed pitchers: 1 (United States) Drew Gillespie; 3 (Australia) Jayden Bastow; 17 (Australia) Josh Guyer; 20 (Australia) Tom Stancic; 21 (Australia) Dylan Clarke; 32 (Australia) Todd Grattan; 33 (Taiwan) Cheng-Hsuan Lin; 35 (Australia) Chris Oxspring; 37 (Australia) Coen Wynne; 39 (Japan) Ichige Takamune; 51 (Australia) Liam Doolan; Left-handed pitchers: 13 (Taiwan) Yi Kai Wang; 18 (Australia) Matthew Rae	Catchers: 6 (Australia) Jake Burns; 24 (United States) Dylan Shockley; Infielders: -- (Australia) Kai McIntosh-Walsh; 7 (Venezuela) Jesus Castillo; 8 (Australia) Zac Shepherd; 9 (Australia) Max Brennen; 11 (Australia) Trent D'Antonio; 23 (United States) Jase Bowen; 26 (United States) Ernny Ordonez; 29 (Australia) Harry Fullerton; 34 (Australia) Jacob Younis; Outfielders: 12 (United States) Sammy Siani; 23 (Australia) Ben Tsui; 25 (Australia) David Kandilas; 28 (Australia) Tyler Spiteri; 31 Dylan Martin	Pitchers: 5 (Australia) Kyle Cross; 30 (United States) Cameron Taylor; 38 (Australia) Adam Bates; 'Infielders’: 15 (Australia) Mitchell Austin; 60 (Australia) Jett Davis; Outfielders: 10 (Australia) Solomon Maguire	Manager: 2 (Australia) Tony Harris; Coaches: 4 (Australia) Scott Tunkin; 19 (Australia) Mark Shipley; 20 (Australia) Jason Dormor; 22 (Australia) Brendan Kingman; 36 (Australia) Brian Murphy; : 7-day disabled list * denotes Development List player
19 November 2022
