= Australia at the Baseball World Cup =

The Australia national baseball team has participated in nine of the International Baseball Federation World Cup tournaments. Australia has made it to the quarter-finals of a tournament three times—1998, 2007 and 2009— and its best result was in the most recent tournament held in 2009, in which Australia placed 5th.

== Baseball World Cup record ==
Baseball World Cup record							Qualification record			
Year	Round	Position	W	L	RS	RA	W	L	RS	RA
1938 to 1976	Did not participate						Did not participate			
(Italy) 1978	–	9th	–	–	–	–	No qualifiers held			
(Japan) 1980	–	7th	4	7	–	–	No qualifiers held			
(South Korea) 1982	–	9th	2	7	–	–	No qualifiers held			
1984 to 1990	Did not participate						Did not participate			
(Nicaragua) 1994	First round	9th	3	4	54	47	Oceanian qualifier			
(Italy) 1998	Quarterfinals	7th	6	4	71	54	Oceanian qualifier			
(Taiwan) 2001	First round	10th	3	4	24	32	Oceanian qualifier			
(Cuba) 2003	Did not qualify						Did not qualify			
(Netherlands) 2005	First round	10th	4	4	41	26	Oceanian qualifier			
(Taiwan) 2007	Quarterfinals	6th	7	3	61	29	Oceanian qualifier			
(Czech Republic) (Netherlands) (Italy) 2009	Third round	5th	9	6	96	64	Oceanian qualifier			
(Panama) 2011	Third round	5th	7	5	56	57	Oceanian qualifier			
Total	Quarterfinals	10/39	45	44	403	309	–	–	–	–

== Netherlands, 2005 ==
The 2005 tournament was hosted by the Netherlands. It consisted of a round-robin series conducted in two pools from which the top four teams in each pool qualified for the quarter-finals. Australia finished 5th in its pool, failing to qualify after finishing with a 4–4 record.

2005 World Cup Results

3 September	Australia	4–2	Puerto Rico	Netherlands Pim Mulier Stadium

4 September	Nicaragua	2–0	Australia	Netherlands Fanny Blankers Koen Sportpark

5 September	Australia	4–6	United States	Netherlands Pim Mulier Stadium

7 September	Czech Republic	0–14 (F/7)	Australia	Netherlands Fanny Blankers Koen Sportpark

9 September	Japan	4–2	Australia	Netherlands Sportpark Ookmeer

10 September	Australia	4–11	Taiwan	Netherlands Neptunus Family Stadium

11 September	Australia	8–0	Spain	Netherlands Sportpark De Heihoef

12 September	Colombia	1–5	Australia	Netherlands Pim Mulier Stadium

== Taiwan, 2007 ==
Australia's performance in the 2007 World Cup was their best ever. They finished 6th and outscored their opponents 61–29 while accumulating a 7–3 record over the course of the tournament, held in Taiwan. Trent Oeltjen was the tournament leader in runs scored (12), stolen bases (7) and batting average (.523), earning him a spot on the All Star team named at the end of the tournament.

Despite the game being shortened to seven innings by the mercy rule, Australia broke the World Cup record for runs scored when they beat Thailand 26–1. The game was also significant in that two position players combined to pitch the final four innings: third baseman Gavin Fingleson threw three innings to record the win, while first baseman Brett Roneberg threw the final inning. Finishing 6th for the tournament earned Australia an automatic berth in the 2009 World Cup.

2007 World Cup Results

7 November	Cuba	3–2 (F/10)	Australia	Taiwan Tianmu Baseball Stadium

8 November	Australia	4–3	Netherlands	Taiwan Tianmu Baseball Stadium

9 November	Australia	7–4 (F/11)	Venezuela	Taiwan Sinjhuang Baseball Stadium

10 November	Thailand	1–26 (F/7)	Australia	Taiwan Sinjhuang Baseball Stadium

11 November	Australia	2–1	South Korea	Taiwan Tianmu Baseball Stadium

13 November	Australia	4–2	Germany	Taiwan Sinjhuang Baseball Stadium

14 November	Canada	7–6	Australia	Taiwan Tianmu Baseball Stadium

16 November; Quarter-final	Australia	0–3	Japan	Taiwan Sinjhuang Baseball Stadium

17 November; 5th–8th Classification	Mexico	1–7	Australia	Taiwan Sinjhuang Baseball Stadium

18 November; 5th–6th Classification	Australia	2–5	South Korea	Taiwan Sinjhuang Baseball Stadium

== Europe, 2009 ==
In September, Australia was one of 22 nations that sent a team to the 2009 World Cup, which was held in seven different countries across Europe. For the first round they were drawn in Pool A, held in Prague, Czech Republic, and competed against Chinese Taipei, Mexico and the hosts Czech Republic. Only a few days after selecting their 24 player squad, Australia was forced to find a replacement for Justin Huber—one of the two players selected with Major League experience—as he was called up from AAA Rochester Red Wings to MLB Minnesota Twins. James Linger was selected as his replacement, making his Australian senior team debut.

=== First round ===
Australia started its campaign with a win in the opening game of the tournament against their first round hosts, Czech Republic. Winning 17–4, one of the highlights was Timothy Kennelly hitting a home run and then a 3-run home run in his first two at bats. Both he and his brother Matthew Kennelly made their national team debut in the game. Following a rest day, Australia faced Chinese Taipei and won 7–5. Australia's hitting was led by Timothy Kennelly another 3-run home run in the third inning to make the score 4–0 (in addition to an outfield assist from right field to save a run in the sixth inning), and James Beresford hitting a 2-run shot in the eighth inning to break the tie and score what would turn out to be the winning runs. This win, combined with Mexico's defeat of Czech Republic assured Australia's progression through to the second round, and determining that their second round play (as well as any further play beyond the second round that they were to qualify for) would be in Italy. In their final game of the first round Australia lost to Mexico 10–9. Given that both teams had already qualified not only for the second round, but would both be playing in the same pool for the round, only momentum into the next round—and their next match in a potentially deciding final game of the pool—was on the line.

2009 World Cup First Round Results

Pool A

Game 1

9 September 16:30 (UTC+2) at Czech Republic Prague
Team	1	2	3	4	5	6	7	8	9	R	H	E
Australia	0	3	3	0	4	0	1	0	6	17	20	1
Czech Republic	0	0	0	0	1	1	2	0	0	4	7	5
WP: Australia Drew Naylor (1–0) LP: Czech Republic Jakus Toufar (1–0); Home runs: Australia: Timothy Kennelly 2 (2), Andrew Graham (1), Stefan Welch (1); Czech Republic: Martin Schneider (1)

Game 3

11 September 12:30 (UTC+2) at Czech Republic Prague
Team	1	2	3	4	5	6	7	8	9	R	H	E
Chinese Taipei	0	0	0	0	0	3	0	2	0	5	8	1
Australia	0	1	3	0	0	1	0	2	X	7	10	2
WP: Australia Adam Bright (1–0) LP: TPE Chien-Ming Wang (0–1); Home runs: TPE: Chung-Chun Wu (1), Kuo-Min Lin (1); Australia: Timothy Kennelly (3), James Beresford (1)

Game 5

12 September 12:30 (UTC+2) at Czech Republic Prague
Team	1	2	3	4	5	6	7	8	9	R	H	E
Mexico	0	5	2	0	0	1	0	1	1	10	16	1
Australia	0	0	1	0	1	5	0	2	0	9	12	1
WP: Mexico Alan Guerrero (1–0) LP: Australia Joshua Hill (0–1) Sv: Mexico Hector Navarro (1); Home runs: Mexico: Christian Presichi (1), Carlos Valencia (1), Jesus Cota (4); Australia: Matthew Kennelly (1), Justin Linger (1), Chris Snelling (1), Joel Naughton (1)

=== Second round ===
Finishing second in their first round pool, Australia qualified for the second round to play in Pool G. Apart from their hosts Italy, the other teams to qualify for Pool G were Canada, Chinese Taipei, Japan, Mexico, Netherlands Antilles and defending champions United States.

Despite being ranked behind five of the teams in its pool on the IBAF World Rankings at the time, Australia finished the round with a 5–2. This tied with Canada and Chinese Taipei, and with the tiebreakers used in the tournament, meant Australia was second, behind only the United States. The Australians compiled a mercy rule victory over the Netherlands Antilles, victories over world No. 3 Japan, world No. 7 Mexico, world No. 8 Canada, and hosts and world No. 15 Italy, while their only defeats were by one run each at the hands of world No. 4 United States and world No. 5 Chinese Taipei.

2009 World Cup Second Round Results

Pool G

Game 1

13 September 18:00 (UTC+2) at Italy Piacenza (F/7)
Team	1	2	3	4	5	6	7	8	9	R	H	E
Netherlands Antilles	0	0	0	1	5	0	0			6	6	1
Australia	2	1	7	0	9	0	X			19	20	0
WP: Australia Drew Naylor (2–0) LP: Netherlands Antilles Andley Simmons (0–1); Home runs: Netherlands Antilles: Raywendley Van Gurp (1); Australia: Luke Hughes (1), Stefan Welch (2)

Game 6

14 September 20:30 (UTC+2) at Italy Novara (F/10)
Team	1	2	3	4	5	6	7	8	9	10	R	H	E
Australia	0	0	0	0	1	0	0	0	1	3	5	6	1
Canada	1	0	0	0	0	0	0	0	1	1	3	7	1
WP: Australia Matthew Williams (1–0) LP: Canada Robert Swindle (0–1); Home runs: Australia: Luke Hughes (2); Canada: Rene Tosoni (2)

Game 9

15 September 20:00 (UTC+2) at Italy Godo (F/10)
Team	1	2	3	4	5	6	7	8	9	10	R	H	E
Australia	0	0	1	0	0	0	0	0	0	3	4	5	1
Chinese Taipei	0	1	0	0	0	0	0	0	0	4	5	5	1
WP: Taiwan Yu-Ching Lin (2–0) LP: Australia Paul Mildren (0–1); Home runs: Australia: None; TPE: Ken-Wei Lin (1), Hung-Yu Lin (1)

Game 15

17 September 18:00 (UTC+2) at Italy Parma
Team	1	2	3	4	5	6	7	8	9	R	H	E
Italy	1	3	0	0	0	0	0	0	0	4	9	0
Australia	0	1	1	2	0	0	0	0	1	5	12	1
WP: Australia Dushan Ruzic (1–0) LP: Italy Christopher Cooper (0–1); Home runs: Italy: None; Australia: Nicholas Kimpton (1)

Game 21

19 September 15:00 (UTC+2) at Italy Bologna
Team	1	2	3	4	5	6	7	8	9	R	H	E
Australia	0	0	0	2	2	0	0	0	1	5	12	0
Japan	0	0	0	0	0	0	0	0	0	0	6	0
WP: Australia Adam Blackley (1–0) LP: Japan Takashi Saito (0–2); Home runs: Australia: Chris Snelling (2); Japan: None

Game 25

20 September 20:00 (UTC+2) at Italy Macerata
Team	1	2	3	4	5	6	7	8	9	R	H	E
Mexico	0	1	0	2	0	0	0	0	2	5	10	0
Australia	0	0	0	0	3	0	2	1	X	6	10	1
WP: Australia Paul Mildren (1–1) LP: Mexico Francisco Cordoba (1–1) Sv: Australia Timothy Cox (1); Home runs: Mexico: Mario Valenzuela (1), Abel Martinez (1); Australia: Brad Harman (1)

Game 19 (Postponed)

18 September 18:00 (UTC+2) at Italy Piacenza
Team	1	2	3	4	5	6	7	8	9	R	H	E
Australia	0	1	0	0	0	0	2	0	0	3	6	2
United States	0	0	0	0	0	2	1	0	1	4	9	1
WP: United States Ehren Wasserman (1–0) LP: Australia Timothy Cox (0–1); Home runs: Australia: None; United States: Justin Smoak (9), Trevor Plouffe (3)

=== Final round ===
2009 World Cup Final Round Results

Group 2

Game 1

22 September 20:00 (UTC+2) at Italy Grosseto
Team	1	2	3	4	5	6	7	8	9	R	H	E
Australia	0	0	1	0	0	0	0	0	0	1	6	1
Cuba	2	0	0	0	0	0	0	0	0	2	3	1
WP: Cuba Norge Vera (3–0) LP: Australia Dushan Ruzic (1–1) Sv: Cuba Pedro Lazo (3); Home runs: Australia: None; Cuba: Alfredo Despaigne (7)

Game 6

23 September 20:00 (UTC+2) at Italy Grosseto
Team	1	2	3	4	5	6	7	8	9	R	H	E
Netherlands	0	0	0	0	0	0	1	1	0	2	6	2
Australia	0	0	0	0	0	2	0	3	X	5	4	2
WP: Australia Matthew Williams (2–0) LP: Netherlands Dennis Neuman (1–1); Home runs: Netherlands: None; Australia: Luke Hughes 2 (4)

Game 12

24 September 20:00 (UTC+2) at Italy Florence
Team	1	2	3	4	5	6	7	8	9	R	H	E
Australia	0	1	2	1	0	0	0	0	0	4	9	2
Venezuela	0	0	2	1	0	0	3	3	X	9	13	3
WP: Venezuela Jose Rodriguez (1–0) LP: Australia Brendan Wise (0–1); Home runs: Australia: None; Venezuela: René Reyes (5)

Game 15

24 September 19:00 (UTC+2) at Italy Chieti
Team	1	2	3	4	5	6	7	8	9	R	H	E
Puerto Rico	0	0	4	0	0	0	0	0	0	4	10	0
Australia	0	2	0	0	0	0	0	0	0	2	3	0
WP: Puerto Rico Orlando Ramon (1–1) LP: Australia Drew Naylor (2–1) Sv: Puerto Rico Richard Rodriguez (4); Home runs: Puerto Rico: Carlos Rivera (1); Australia: Stefan Welch (3), Timothy Kennelly (4)

5th place Final

26 September 20:00 (UTC+2) at Italy Messina
Team	1	2	3	4	5	6	7	8	9	R	H	E
Australia	1	0	0	0	0	0	2	1	0	4	6	0
Netherlands	0	0	1	0	0	0	0	0	0	1	8	1
WP: Australia David Welch (1–0) LP: Netherlands Arschwin Asjes (0–2) Sv: Australia Dushan Ruzic (1); Home runs: Australia: Stefan Welch (4); Netherlands: None

== Panama, 2011 ==
Australia is scheduled to participate in the 2011 tournament in Panama, to be held in October 2011. They will in the same pool for the first round of as Cuba, Dominican Republic, Germany, Italy, Nicaragua, South Korea, and Venezuela.

== Overall record ==
Australian World Cup Record by opponent (Since 1998)
Opponent	Tournaments met	W–L record	Largest victory		Largest defeat		Current streak
Opponent	Tournaments met	W–L record	Score	Tournament	Score	Tournament	Current streak
Canada	5	4–1	7–0	Panama 2011	7–6	Taiwan 2007	W2
Chinese Taipei	3	2–2	6–3	Italy 1998	11–4	Netherlands 2005	L1
Colombia	1	1–0	5–1	Netherlands 2005	–		W1
Cuba	4	0–4	–		14–0 (F/7)	Panama 2011	L4
Czech Republic	2	2–0	14–0 (F/7)	Netherlands 2005	–		W2
Dominican Republic	2	2–0	9–2	Italy 1998	–		W2
Germany	2	2–0	9–6	Panama 2011	–		W2
Italy	3	1–2	5–4	Italy 2009	7–0	Panama 2011	L1
Japan	4	1–4	5–0	Italy 2009	8–0	Taiwan 2001	W1
Mexico	2	2–1	7–1	Taiwan 2007	10–9	Czech Republic 2009	W1
Netherlands	5	3–3	4–1	Italy 2009	6–0	Taiwan 2001	L1
Netherlands Antilles	1	1–0	19–6 (F/7)	Italy 2009	–		W1
Nicaragua	3	2–1	9–2	Italy 1998	2–0	Netherlands 2005	W1
Panama	2	1–1	5–4 (F/8)	Panama 2011	8–2	Taiwan 2001	L1
Philippines	1	1–0	13–0 (F/7)	Taiwan 2001	–		W1
Puerto Rico	2	1–1	4–2	Netherlands 2005	4–2	Italy 2009	L1
Russia	2	2–0	6–2	Italy 1998	–		W2
South Korea	3	3–2	7–2	Italy 1998	8–0	Panama 2011	W1
Spain	1	1–0	8–0	Netherlands 2005	–		W1
Thailand	1	1–0	26–1 (F/7)	Taiwan 2007	–		W1
United States	4	0–4	–		8–5	Italy 1998	L4
Venezuela	3	2–1	15–0 (F/5)	Panama 2011	9–4	Italy 2009	W1
Overall	6	35–27	Against THA		Against CUB		W2
Overall	6	35–27	26–1 (F/7)	Taiwan 2007	14–0 (F/7)	Panama 2011	W2

== See also ==
- Australian Baseball Federation
- Australia national baseball team
- Baseball World Cup
