= 2026 World Baseball Classic Pool C =

Pool C of the 2026 World Baseball Classic (branded as the World Baseball Classic 2026 Tokyo dip for sponsorship reasons) took place from March 5 to 10, 2026, at the Tokyo Dome in Tokyo, Japan. The third of four pools, the top two teams automatically qualified for the top-eight knockout stage, beginning with quarterfinals in Houston and Miami, United States.

The group consisted of Japan (co-host), Australia, South Korea, Czechia, and Chinese Taipei. Japan, the defending champions, won the pool undefeated and advanced to the quarterfinals. South Korea clinched the second place spot after defeating Australia 7–2, scoring just enough to win the run differential tiebreaker; they advanced into the second round of the WBC for the first time since 2009. Czechia was relegated after failing to win a game and must re-qualify for the next edition of the tournament.

== Teams ==
Draw position	Team	Pot	Confederation	Method of qualification	Date of qualification	Finals appearance	Last appearance	Previous best performance	WBSC Rankings
B1	Japan	1	WBSC Asia	Hosts + 2023 participants	March 8, 2023	6th	2023	Champions (2006, 2009, 2023)	1
B2	Australia	3	WBSC Oceania	2023 participants	March 8, 2023	6th	2023	Quarterfinals (2023)	11
B3	South Korea	2	WBSC Asia	2023 participants	March 8, 2023	6th	2023	Runners-up (2009)	4
B4	Czechia	4	WBSC Europe	2023 participants	March 8, 2023	2nd	2023	Pool stage (2023)	15
B5	Chinese Taipei	5	WBSC Asia	Qualifiers Pool A runners-up	February 25, 2025	6th	2023	Quarterfinals (2013)	2

== Standings ==
Pos	Team	Pld	W	L	RF	RA	PCT	GB	Qualification
1	Japan (H)	4	4	0	34	9	1.000	—	Advance to knockout stage
2	South Korea	4	2	2	28	19	.500 (Note: Runs allowed per defensive out between tied teams: South Korea .123 (7 runs/57 outs), Australia and Chinese Taipei .130 (7 runs/54 outs))	2	Advance to knockout stage
3	Australia	4	2	2	13	12	.500 (Note: Earned runs allowed per defensive out between tied teams: Australia .111 (6 earned runs/54 outs), Chinese Taipei .130 (7 earned runs/54 outs))	2	
4	Chinese Taipei	4	2	2	19	20	.500	2	
5	Czechia	4	0	4	5	39	.000	4	Requalification required for next WBC

Source: MLB
(H) Hosts

== Summary ==
Date	Local time	Road team	Score	Home team	Inn.	Venue	Game duration	Attendance	Boxscore
Mar 5, 2026	12:00 JST	Chinese Taipei	0–3	Australia		Tokyo Dome	2:15	40,523	Boxscore
Mar 5, 2026	19:00 JST	Czechia	4–11	South Korea		Tokyo Dome	2:39	19,920	Boxscore
Mar 6, 2026	12:00 JST	Australia	5–1	Czechia		Tokyo Dome	2:17	21,514	Boxscore
Mar 6, 2026	19:00 JST	Japan	13–0	Chinese Taipei	7	Tokyo Dome	2:36	42,314	Boxscore
Mar 7, 2026	12:00 JST	Chinese Taipei	14–0	Czechia	7	Tokyo Dome	2:20	40,522	Boxscore
Mar 7, 2026	19:00 JST	South Korea	6–8	Japan		Tokyo Dome	3:04	42,318	Boxscore
Mar 8, 2026	12:00 JST	Chinese Taipei	5–4	South Korea	10	Tokyo Dome	2:58	40,584	Boxscore
Mar 8, 2026	19:00 JST	Australia	3–4	Japan		Tokyo Dome	2:33	42,331	Boxscore
Mar 9, 2026	19:00 JST	South Korea	7–2	Australia		Tokyo Dome	3:01	32,908	Boxscore
Mar 10, 2026	19:00 JST	Czechia	0–9	Japan		Tokyo Dome	2:36	42,340	Boxscore

== Games ==
=== Chinese Taipei vs. Australia ===
March 5, 2026 12:00 PM JST at Tokyo Dome in Tokyo, Japan
Team	1	2	3	4	5	6	7	8	9	R	H	E
Chinese Taipei	0	0	0	0	0	0	0	0	0	0	3	0
Australia	0	0	0	0	2	0	1	0	X	3	7	1
WP: Jack O'Loughlin (1−0) LP: Chen Po-yu (0−1) Sv: Jon Kennedy (1); Home runs: TPE: None; AUS: Robbie Perkins (1), Travis Bazzana (1); Attendance: 40,523; Umpires: HP – Omar Peralta, 1B – Manny Gonzalez, 2B – Chad Fairchild, 3B – Charlie Ramos; Boxscore

=== Czechia vs. South Korea ===
March 5, 2026 7:00 PM JST at Tokyo Dome in Tokyo, Japan
Team	1	2	3	4	5	6	7	8	9	R	H	E
Czechia	0	0	0	0	3	0	0	0	1	4	9	1
South Korea	4	1	1	0	2	0	2	1	X	11	10	0
WP: So Hyeong-jun (1−0) LP: Daniel Padyšák (0−1); Home runs: CZE: Terrin Vavra (1); KOR: Moon Bo-gyeong (1), Shay Whitcomb 2 (2), Jahmai Jones (1); Attendance: 19,920; Umpires: HP – David Rackley, 1B – Edward Pinales, 2B – Ryan Additon, 3B – Edwin Louisa; Boxscore

=== Australia vs. Czechia ===
March 6, 2026 12:00 PM JST at Tokyo Dome in Tokyo, Japan
Team	1	2	3	4	5	6	7	8	9	R	H	E
Australia	0	0	3	0	0	0	0	0	2	5	9	1
Czechia	0	1	0	0	0	0	0	0	0	1	4	0
WP: Josh Hendrickson (1−0) LP: Tomáš Ondra (0−1); Home runs: AUS: Curtis Mead (1), Alex Hall (1); CZE: None; Attendance: 21,514; Umpires: HP – Ryan Additon, 1B – Ruben Ramos, 2B – Todd Tichenor, 3B – Edward Pinales; Boxscore

=== Japan vs. Chinese Taipei ===
March 6, 2026 7:00 PM JST at Tokyo Dome in Tokyo, Japan
Team	1	2	3	4	5	6	7	R	H	E
Japan	0	10	3	0	0	0	0	13	13	1
Chinese Taipei	0	0	0	0	0	0	0	0	1	0
WP: Yoshinobu Yamamoto (1−0) LP: Cheng Hao-jun (0−1); Home runs: JPN: Shohei Ohtani (1); TPE: None; Attendance: 42,314; Umpires: HP – Jordan Baker, 1B – David Rackley, 2B – Omar Peralta, 3B – Edwin Louisa; Boxscore

=== Chinese Taipei vs. Czechia ===
March 7, 2026 12:00 PM JST at Tokyo Dome in Tokyo, Japan
Team	1	2	3	4	5	6	7	R	H	E
Chinese Taipei	2	4	0	2	1	5	0	14	11	0
Czechia	0	0	0	0	0	0	0	0	4	1
WP: Chen Zhong-Ao Zhuang (1–0) LP: Jan Novák (0–1); Home runs: TPE: Stuart Fairchild (1); CZE: None; Attendance: 40,522; Umpires: HP – Ruben Ramos, 1B – Omar Peralta, 2B – Chad Fairchild, 3B – Manny Gonzalez; Boxscore

=== South Korea vs. Japan ===
March 7, 2026 7:00 PM JST at Tokyo Dome in Tokyo, Japan
Team	1	2	3	4	5	6	7	8	9	R	H	E
South Korea	3	0	0	2	0	0	0	1	0	6	9	0
Japan	2	0	3	0	0	0	3	0	X	8	7	0
WP: Atsuki Taneichi (1–0) LP: Park Yeong-hyun (0–1) Sv: Taisei Ota (1); Home runs: KOR: Hyeseong Kim (1); JPN: Shohei Ohtani (2), Seiya Suzuki 2 (2), Masataka Yoshida (1); Attendance: 42,318; Umpires: HP – Todd Tichenor, 1B – Jordan Baker, 2B – Edward Pinales, 3B – Edwin Louisa; Boxscore

=== Chinese Taipei vs. South Korea ===
March 8, 2026 12:00 PM JST at Tokyo Dome in Tokyo, Japan
Team	1	2	3	4	5	6	7	8	9	10	R	H	E
Chinese Taipei	0	1	0	0	0	1	0	2	0	1	5	7	0
South Korea	0	0	0	0	1	2	0	1	0	0	4	4	0
WP: Yi Chang (1–0) LP: Woo-suk Go (0–1) Sv: Jyun-Yue Tseng (1); Home runs: TPE: Yu Chang (1), Tsung-Che Cheng (1), Stuart Fairchild (2); KOR: Kim Do-yeong (1); Attendance: 40,584; Umpires: HP – Manny Gonzalez, 1B – David Rackley, 2B – Ruben Ramos, 3B – Omar Peralta; Boxscore

=== Australia vs. Japan ===
March 8, 2026 7:00 PM JST at Tokyo Dome in Tokyo, Japan
Team	1	2	3	4	5	6	7	8	9	R	H	E
Australia	0	0	0	0	0	1	0	0	2	3	8	0
Japan	0	0	0	0	0	0	2	2	X	4	5	1
WP: Chihiro Sumida (1–0) LP: Jon Kennedy (0–1) Sv: Taisei Ota (2); Home runs: AUS: Alex Hall (2), Rixon Wingrove (1); JPN: Masataka Yoshida (2); Attendance: 42,331; Umpires: HP – Chad Fairchild, 1B – Edwin Louisa, 2B – Ryan Additon, 3B – Edward Pinales; Boxscore

=== South Korea vs. Australia ===
March 9, 2026 7:00 PM JST at Tokyo Dome in Tokyo, Japan
Team	1	2	3	4	5	6	7	8	9	R	H	E
South Korea	0	2	2	0	1	1	0	0	1	7	10	0
Australia	0	0	0	0	1	0	0	1	0	2	5	1
WP: Son Ju-young (1–0) LP: Lachlan Wells (0–1); Home runs: KOR: Moon Bo-gyeong (2); AUS: Robbie Glendinning (1); Attendance: 32,908; Umpires: HP – David Rackley, 1B – Todd Tichenor, 2B – Edwin Louisa, 3B – Edward Pinales; Boxscore

=== Czechia vs. Japan ===
March 10, 2026 7:00 PM JST at Tokyo Dome in Tokyo, Japan
Team	1	2	3	4	5	6	7	8	9	R	H	E
Czechia	0	0	0	0	0	0	0	0	0	0	2	2
Japan	0	0	0	0	0	0	0	9	X	9	12	0
WP: Yumeto Kanemaru (1–0) LP: Michal Kovala (0–1); Home runs: CZE: None; JPN: Ukyo Shuto (1), Munetaka Murakami (1); Attendance: 42,340; Umpires: HP – Ryan Additon, 1B – Jordan Baker, 2B – Omar Peralta, 3B – Ruben Ramos; Boxscore

== Statistics ==
=== Batting ===
Team	AB	R	H	2B	3B	HR	RBI	SB	CS	BB	SO	AVG	OBP	SLG	OPS	TB
Japan	123	34	37	6	0	8	38	4	3	29	31	.301	.442	.545	.987	82
South Korea	136	28	33	9	0	7	27	4	2	16	47	.243	.333	.463	.796	66
Australia	126	13	29	3	1	7	12	2	1	12	30	.230	.307	.437	.744	55
Chinese Taipei	118	19	22	2	0	4	18	10	0	17	31	.186	.307	.305	.612	36
Czechia	114	5	19	3	0	1	5	2	0	8	41	.167	.230	.219	.449	25

=== Pitching ===
Team	ERA	IP	H	R	ER	HR	BB	K	WHIP
Japan	2.12	34	20	9	8	3	8	49	0.824
South Korea	4.50	36	28	19	18	9	16	35	1.222
Australia	2.83	35	22	12	11	2	21	24	1.229
Chinese Taipei	5.63	32	28	20	20	4	16	26	1.375
Czechia	10.69	32	42	39	38	9	21	23	1.969
