= Sam Street (baseball) =

Melbourne Aces – No. 34
- Pitcher
- Born: 18 March 1992 (age 34); Melbourne, Australia
- Bats: Right Throws: Right
- Stats at Baseball Reference

Samuel James Street (born 18 March 1992) is an Australian professional baseball pitcher for the Adelaide Giants of the Australian Baseball League.

== Career ==
Street was drafted in the 16th round of the 2014 MLB draft by the Pittsburgh Pirates. He signed and spent 2014 with the Jamestown Jammers where he was 1–1 with an 0.98 ERA and 0.61 WHIP in 27.2 innings pitched out of the bullpen. In 2015, he pitched for the West Virginia Power where he compiled a 3–1 record and 2.10 ERA in 34 relief appearances, and in 2016, he played for the Bradenton Marauders, pitching to a 3–2 record and 2.26 ERA in 27 appearances out of the bullpen. Street spent 2017 back with Bradenton where he collected a 4–2 record and 2.74 ERA in 69 innings. Street was released from the organization on May 7, 2018.

On May 12, 2018, Street signed with the Kansas City T-Bones of the independent American Association. He was released on March 1, 2019.

== International career ==
In 2017, he was a member of the Australia national baseball team in the 2017 World Baseball Classic.

In 2018, he was selected exhibition series against Japan.
