= Mike Walker (infielder) =

American baseball player (born 1988)

Melbourne Aces – No. 3
- Third baseman
- Born: June 12, 1988 (age 37); Marysville, California, U.S.
- Bats: Left Throws: Right
- Stats at Baseball Reference

Michael Walker (born June 12, 1988) is an Australian-American professional baseball third baseman for the Melbourne Aces of the Australian Baseball League.

== Career ==
After his senior season for the Pacific Tigers baseball team, he was drafted by the Milwaukee Brewers in the 14th round of the 2010 Major League Baseball draft, playing the 2010-2013 seasons with Brewers' minor league affiliates, peaking with the Double-A Huntsville Stars. He played for Team Australia in the 2013 World Baseball Classic.
