= Jesús Cota =

Mexican baseball player

- First baseman / Outfielder
- Born: November 7, 1981 (age 44); Hermosillo, Sonora, Mexico
- Bats: Left Throws: Right
- Stats at Baseball Reference

Jesús Ernesto Cota Cardenas (born November 7, 1981) is a Mexican professional baseball first baseman and outfielder. He played in minor league baseball and in the Mexican League.

== Career ==
Cota attended Sunnyside High School and Pima Community College. The Arizona Diamondbacks drafted Cota in the 14th round of the 2000 MLB draft and signed for $60,000. He made his professional debut the next summer with the Missoula Osprey. He hit .368 with 16 home runs, 74 runs and 71 runs batted in (RBIs) in 75 games for the team as he captured the Pioneer League Triple Crown. Cota made the league All-Star team at first base and won the MVP Award. Baseball America named him the league's #2 prospect.

In 2002, with the Lancaster JetHawks, he led the California League with 101 RBI. He hit .280/.325/.441 with 33 doubles and 16 home runs. His plate discipline appeared worse with 38 walks to 121 strikeouts in 540 AB.

He spent 2003 and most of 2004 with the El Paso Diablos. He hit .272/.322/.341 in 2003 while moving to the outfield. He ground into 17 double plays, leading the Texas League. He finished ninth in the TL with a .290 average in the latter season, with a .324 OBP and .451 slugging mark and returning to first base. He again led the league in double plays ground into, with 23. Cota played in the 2004 All-Star Futures Game.

Cota began 2005 with the Class-AA Tennessee Smokies, where he hit .266/.325/.427 with 14 home runs and 68 RBI and earned a spot on the Southern League mid-season All-Star team before being promoted to the Tucson Sidewinders in July. He hit .214/.248/.333 only in 37 games for Tucson. He was back with Tennessee in 2006, hitting .233/.283/.377 with 15 homers and 54 RBIs despite playing almost every game.

Cota played for the Saraperos de Saltillo in the Mexican League in 2007, hitting .297/.357/.479. In the 2007–2008 winter season, he batted .323/.415/.477 for the Naranjeros de Hermosillo.

Cota hit .393/.433/.500 as Mexico's first baseman in the 2008 Final Olympic Qualification Tournament as they failed to win a spot in the 2008 Summer Olympics. Jesús tied Dae-ho Lee for 10th in the event in average. He had a big single off of Adam Bright in the 8th inning of the game against the Australian national baseball team to start the winning rally.

Cota played in the 2009 Baseball World Cup for Mexico.

In April 2014, he had a surgery on his right knee, and did not play the 2014 season for Saraperos de Saltillo. Instead, he played for Charros de Jalisco in the Mexican Pacific League season of 2014–2015.

In early April 2015, he suffered a leg injury, but recovered well, and came back to play for Saraperos de Saltillo in late April.
