= Michael Moyle (baseball) =

Australian baseball player

Michael James Moyle
Personal information
- Born: 8 September 1971 (age 54) Dianella, Western Australia, Australia

Sport
- Country: Australia
- Sport: Baseball

Michael James Moyle (born 8 September 1971 in Dianella, Western Australia), is an Australian baseball player. He competed at the 2000 Summer Olympics.

Moyle played professional baseball in the USA for 9 years, including two seasons for the Akron Aeros at the Double-A level of Minor league baseball.
