= Shin Min-jae =

South Korean baseball player (born 1996)

LG Twins – No. 4
- Infielder
- Born: January 21, 1996 (age 30); Incheon, South Korea
- Bats: Left Throws: Right

KBO debut
- March 23, 2019, for the LG Twins

KBO statistics (through 2025 season)
- Batting average: .291
- Home runs: 1
- Runs batted in: 141
- Stats at Baseball Reference

Teams
- Doosan Bears (2015–2017); LG Twins (2018–present)

Shin Min-jae (Korean: 신민재; born January 21, 1996) is a South Korean professional baseball infielder currently playing for the LG Twins of the KBO League.

== Career ==
He represented the South Korea national baseball team at the 2026 World Baseball Classic.
