= Mitch Neunborn =

Philadelphia Phillies
- Pitcher
- Born: 27 June 1997 (age 28); Johannesburg, South Africa
- Bats: Right Throws: Right

Mitchell Carl Neunborn (born 27 June 1997) is a South African professional baseball pitcher in the Philadelphia Phillies organization.

Neunborn played collegiately at North Iowa Area Community College during the 2017 season, playing shortstop while also pitching occasionally. In 47 games, he hit .331 with 13 home runs. Neunborn also posted a 3.18 ERA over 5 2/3 innings across three pitching appearances with the Trojans. The following summer, he played for the Medford Rogues, batting .291 with 9 runs in 29 games. Neunborn also made two appearances on the mound, posting a 4.50 ERA in two innings.

Neunborn made his professional debut with the Perth Heat of the Australian Baseball League during the 2019-20 ABL season, mostly appearing as a pitcher for the Heat. Neunborn pitched to a 1.86 ERA over 9 2/3 innings across four appearances. Neunborn signed with the Adelaide Giants for the 2019-20 ABL season, during which he'd capture the league's rookie of the year award while pitching to a 1.75 ERA over five starts of 25 2/3 total innings. During the cancelled 2021-22 ABL season, he pitched for the West Torrens Eagles, pitching to a 0.19 ERA with the club en route to a championship. Returning to Adelaide for the 2022-23 ABL season, Neunborn was one of the league's best relief pitchers, registering a 2.25 ERA in 28 innings across 13 appearances. Following the season, Neunborn signed with the Québec Capitales of the Frontier League. He would also be named to the Australia national baseball team's roster for the 2023 World Baseball Classic the following month.

On 29 March 2023, prior to the start of the 2023 Frontier League season, Neunborn's contract was purchased by the Philadelphia Phillies from the Capitales. He spent the 2023 season with the High-A Jersey Shore Blue Claws, earning a pitcher of the week nod and later playing in the Arizona Fall League. Neunborn would begin the 2024 season with the Double-A Reading Fightin Phils.
