= Matt Kennelly =

Australian professional baseball catcher (born 1989)

- Catcher
- Born: 21 March 1989 (age 37); East Fremantle, Western Australia, Australia
- Bats: Right Throws: Right
- Stats at Baseball Reference

Mathew Luke Kennelly (born 21 March 1989) is an Australian professional baseball catcher. He is the younger brother of Timothy Kennelly.

== International competition ==
Kennelly appeared for Australia in both the 2009 Baseball World Cup and the 2013 World Baseball Classic.
