= Miguel Gómez (pitcher, born 2001) =

Panamanian baseball player (born 2001)

Caliente de Durango
- Pitcher
- Born: September 10, 2001 (age 24); Panama City, Panama
- Bats: Right Throws: Right

Miguel Ángel Gómez (born September 10, 2001) is a Panamanian professional baseball pitcher for the Caliente de Durango of the Mexican Baseball League.

== Professional career ==
=== Washington Nationals ===
Gómez signed with the Washington Nationals of Major League Baseball on April 9, 2019 as an international free agent. He made his professional debut that year in the Dominican Summer League. He spent the next few years splitting time between the Florida Complex League, the A-Level Fredericksburg Nationals, and the High A Wilmington Blue Rocks. In 2024, Gómez played 32 games for the Blue Rocks, with a 3-2 record and a 2.89 ERA. During the 2025 season, Gómez was promoted to the Double A Harrisburg Senators for the first time. In 17 games for the Senators, Gómez had a 2-1 record and 4.71 ERA. Gómez was released on July 24, 2025.

=== Bravos de Leon ===
On July 29, 2025, Gómez signed with the Bravos de León of the Mexican Baseball League. Gómez only played 2 games for Bravos, pitching 4 innings without allowing a run.

=== Caliente de Durango ===
Gómez signed with the Caliente de Durango of the Mexican League on June 11, 2026.

== International career ==
Gómez was named to the Panama national baseball team for the 2024 WBSC Premier12 and the 2026 World Baseball Classic.
