= Coen Wynne =

Australian baseball player (born 1999)

Free agent
- Pitcher
- Born: 25 January 1999 (age 27); Westmead, New South Wales, Australia
- Bats: Right Throws: Right

KBO debut
- 4 May, 2025, for the LG Twins

KBO statistics (through 2025 season)
- Win–loss record: 1–1
- Earned run average: 7.04
- Strikeouts: 8
- Stats at Baseball Reference

Teams
- LG Twins (2025)

Coen James William Wynne (born 25 January 1999) is an Australian professional baseball pitcher who is a free agent. He has previously played in the KBO League for the LG Twins.

== Career ==
Wynne played college baseball for Grand Canyon University from 2018 to 2021. In 80 appearances (all out of the bullpen) during his collegiate career, Wynne compiled a 3-2 record and 3.98 ERA with 99 strikeouts and one save across 115 1/3 innings pitched.

Following his college career, Wynne signed with the Melbourne Aces of the Australian Baseball League.

On 21 April 2025, Wynne signed with the LG Twins of the KBO League as a temporary injury replacement for Elieser Hernández. He made his KBO debut on 4 May against the SSG Landers, recording the win after allowing three earned runs over six innings of work. Wynne made five total starts for the Twins, pitching to a 1-1 record and 7.04 ERA with eight strikeouts across 23 innings pitched. On 29 May, Wynne left the team following the expiration of his six-week contract.
