= Alex Hall (baseball) =

Australian baseball player (born 1999)

Ulsan Whales
- Catcher / First Baseman / Leftfielder
- Born: 8 June 1999 (age 27); Perth, Western Australia
- Bats: Switch Throws: Right

Teams
- Ulsan Whales (2026–present)

Career highlights and awards
- Helms Award (2023)

Alex Hall (born 8 June 1999) is an Australian professional baseball catcher for the Ulsan Whales of the KBO Futures League. He is a phantom ballplayer, having spent a day on the Milwaukee Brewers' active roster without appearing in a game.

== Career ==
=== Milwaukee Brewers ===
On 5 December 2017, Hall was signed by the Milwaukee Brewers as a free agent, and was assigned to the rookie–level Arizona League Brewers, where he spent the 2018 season, hitting .244 in 27 games. Hall spent the 2019 season split between the AZL Brewers and the rookie–level Rocky Mountain Vibes. In 50 total games, he hit a cumulative .280/.322/.378 with 1 home run and 26 RBI.

Hall did not play in a game in 2020 due to the cancellation of the minor league season because of the COVID-19 pandemic. He played the 2021 season with the Single–A Carolina Mudcats and the High–A Wisconsin Timber Rattlers. In 52 games between the two affiliates, Hall batted .236/.307/.382 with career–highs in home runs (3) and RBI (34). Hall started the 2022 season with the Timber Rattlers.

On 2 June 2022, Hall was unexpectedly called up to the major leagues, after starting catcher Omar Narváez was suddenly placed on the COVID-19 injured list; Hall did not play for the Brewers, and was designated for assignment the following day, making him a phantom ballplayer. He cleared waivers and was sent outright to High–A Wisconsin on 5 June.

In 2023, Hall played in 78 games for High–A Wisconsin, batting .227/.328/.401 with new career–highs in home runs (11) and RBI (40). On 20 September 2023, Hall was released by the Brewers organization.

He has also played for Perth Heat in the Australian Baseball League since 2016. He won the Helms Award as the league's Most Valuable Player in 2023.

=== Ulsan Whales ===
Hall signed with the Ulsan Whales of the KBO Futures League. In 96 appearances for Ulsan, Hall batted .265 and led the league with 70 RBI; he was also named an league All-Star. Hall subsequently announced that he had re-signed with the Perth Heat for the upcoming ABL season.

== International career ==
Hall was selected to the Australian national baseball team roster for the 2023 and 2026 World Baseball Classics. He had also competed for Australia at the amateur level in the 2017 U-23 Baseball World Cup, the 2018 U-23 Baseball World Cup, and the 2022 U-23 World Cup.
