= Sam Holland (baseball) =

Australian baseball player (born 1994)

Samuel Holland

Brisbane Bandits – No. 40
- Pitcher
- Born: 20 February 1994 (age 32); Brisbane, Queensland, Australia
- Bats: Right Throws: Right
- Stats at Baseball Reference

Samuel Joseph Holland (born 20 February 1994) is an Australian professional baseball player for the Brisbane Bandits of the Australian Baseball League.

== Career ==
=== San Diego Padres ===
On 28 November 2012 Holland signed a minor league contract with the San Diego Padres organization.

In 2013, he debuted for the Arizona League Padres of the Arizona League, impressing with a 2.25 ERA and 34 strikeouts in just 32 innings pitched. In 2014, Holland was moved up to the Low-A Eugene Emeralds, and again had a successful campaign, sporting a 2.43 ERA and striking out 53 batters and walking only 6 in 40 2/3 innings of work.

In 2016, Holland was a member of the Lake Elsinore Storm and the Tri-City Dust Devils. He was released on 31 March 2016.

=== Los Angeles Angels ===
On 4 April 2016 Holland signed a minor league contract with the Los Angeles Angels organization.

In 2017, Holland made 45 appearances out of the bullpen for the Double–A Inland Empire 66ers, registering a 3.22 ERA with 58 strikeouts and 7 saves. He elected free agency following the season on 6 November 2017.

=== Mannheim Tornados ===
On 8 March 2019, Holland signed with the Mannheim Tornados of the Baseball Bundesliga.

=== Brisbane Bandits ===
Holland has pitched for his hometown Brisbane Bandits returning every year during the winter since the 2014-15 ABL season. In addition to his activity in the Australian Baseball League.

== Australian National Team ==
Holland has played for Team Australia at the U21 World Cup.

In 2017, he was a member of the Australia national baseball team in the 2017 World Baseball Classic.

In 2018, he was selected exhibition series against Japan.

In 2019, he was selected to Team Australia at the 2019 WBSC Premier12.
