= Robbie Perkins =

Australian baseball player (born 1994)

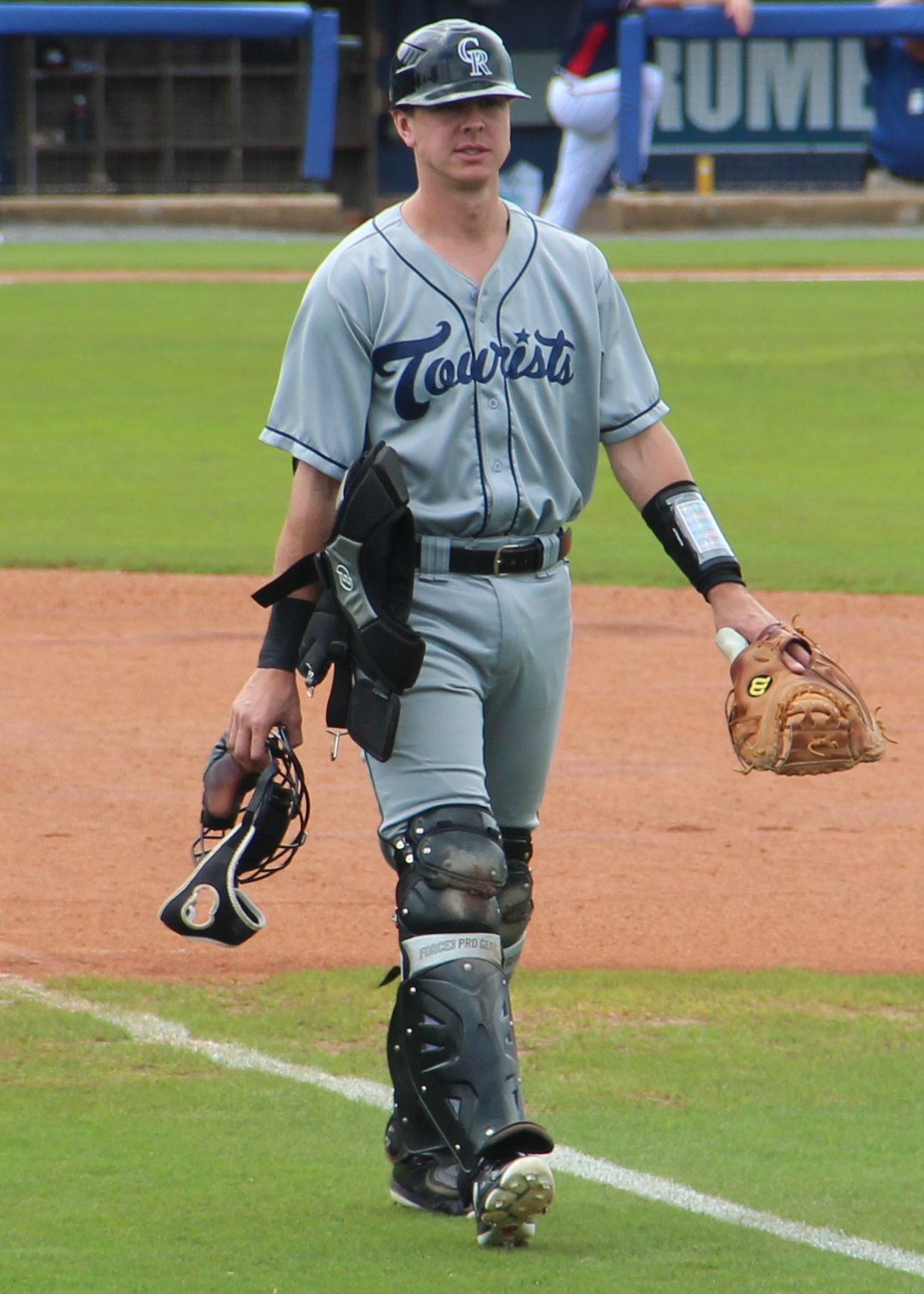
- Perkins with the Asheville Tourists in 2018

Canberra Cavalry – No. 9
- Catcher
- Born: 29 May 1994 (age 32); Canberra, Australia
- Bats: Right Throws: Right
- Stats at Baseball Reference

Robert Perkins (born 29 May 1994) is an Australian professional baseball catcher for the Canberra Cavalry of the Australian Baseball League (ABL).

== Career ==
Perkins plays in the Australian Baseball League for the Canberra Cavalry. He signed a minor league contract with the Colorado Rockies in January 2012. He made his professional debut in 2013 for the Grand Junction Rockies and spent the whole season there, batting .162/.234/.265 with three home runs and 12 RBI in 35 games. He spent 2014 with Tri-City Dust Devils where he compiled a .202 batting average with one home run and seven RBI in 38 games. Perkins spent the 2015 season with the Asheville Tourists where he posted a .200 batting average with one home run and 14 RBI in 41 games, and 2016 with the Modesto Nuts where he slashed .238/.396/.310 in only 15 games due to injury.

During the 2016-17 Australian Baseball League season, Perkins was named the Cavalry's most valuable player. He spent 2017 with Asheville, the Albuquerque Isotopes, and the Lancaster JetHawks where he batted a combined .222 with five home runs and 18 RBI in 53 games between the three teams.

Perkins split the 2018 season between Asheville and the Double–A Hartford Yard Goats. In 32 games between the two affiliates, he hit .232/.272/.306 with two home runs and six RBI. Perkins elected free agency following the season on 2 November 2018.

== International career ==
Perkins was selected for the Australian national baseball team at the 2017 World Baseball Classic Qualification in 2016 and 2019 WBSC Premier12.
