= Rixon Wingrove =

Australian baseball player (born 2000)

Tokushima Indigo Socks
- First baseman
- Born: 23 May 2000 (age 26); Newcastle, New South Wales, Australia
- Bats: Left Throws: Right
- Stats at Baseball Reference

Rixon James Taylor-Wingrove (born 23 May 2000) is an Australian professional baseball first baseman for the Tokushima Indigo Socks of the Shikoku Island League Plus. He was named to the Australian national baseball team for the 2023 and 2026 World Baseball Classic.

== Career ==
=== Philadelphia Phillies ===
Wingrove signed with the Philadelphia Phillies as an international free agent on 20 April 2018. He made his professional debut with the rookie–level Gulf Coast League Phillies. He spent the 2019 campaign back with the GCL Phillies, playing in 48 games and hitting .298/.374/.500 with 5 home runs and 37 RBI. He did not play in a game in 2020 due to the cancellation of the minor league season because of the COVID-19 pandemic.

In 2021, Wingrove played for the Single–A Clearwater Threshers and rookie–level FCL Phillies, for whom he batted a combined .203/.289/.360 with 11 home runs and 39 RBI. In 2022, Wingrove played primarily for the High–A Jersey Shore Blue Claws, hitting .251/.349/.466 with 12 home runs and 43 RBI. Wingrove also played for the Adelaide Giants of the Australian Baseball League. He split the 2023 season between Jersey Shore and the Double–A Reading Fightin Phils, accumulating a .232/.324/.407 batting line with 16 home runs and 66 RBI across 116 games. He was released by the Phillies organization on 23 March 2024.

=== Long Island Ducks ===
On 9 April 2024, Wingrove signed with the Long Island Ducks of the Atlantic League of Professional Baseball. In 18 games for the Ducks, Wingrove batted .305/.406/.525 with three home runs and nine RBI.

=== Minnesota Twins ===
On 24 May 2024, Wingrove's contract was purchased by the Minnesota Twins organization. In 66 games split between the Single-A Fort Myers Mighty Mussels and High-A Cedar Rapids Kernels, he batted .251/.347/.481 with 13 home runs and 45 RBI. Wingrove elected free agency following the season on 4 November.

=== Kansas City Monarchs ===
On 9 January 2025, Wingrove signed with the Kansas City Monarchs of the American Association of Professional Baseball.

=== Tokushima Indigo Socks ===
On 14 May 2026, Wingrove signed with the Tokushima Indigo Socks of the Shikoku Island League Plus. In 22 games with the Indigo Socks, Wingrove hit .377 with four homers, 12 RBI and a 1.154 OPS. The Indigo Socks would go on to win the league, and Wingrove was named championship MVP.

== International career ==
Wingrove played for the Australian national baseball team in the 2023 and 2026 World Baseball Classics. He had four runs batted in in Australia's win over China. He also played for the national team during the 2024 WBSC Premier12.
