= Australia national baseball team =

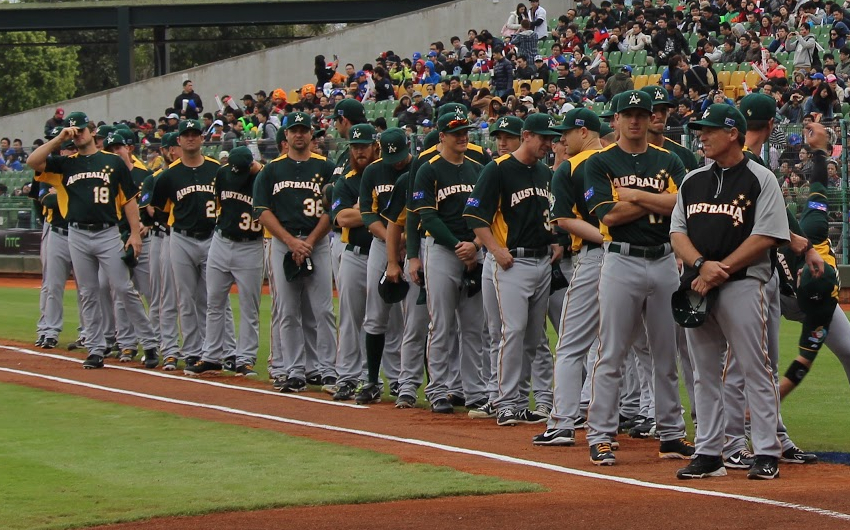

Information
- Country: Australia
- Federation: Baseball Australia
- Confederation: Baseball Confederation of Oceania
- Manager: Dave Nilsson
- Captain: Tim Kennelly and Warwick Saupold
- Team Colors: Dark Green, Gold, White, Grey

WBSC ranking
- Current: 8 ▲2 (18 November 2026)
- Highest: 6 (3 times; latest in June 2021)
- Lowest: 14 (December 2014)

Uniforms

Olympic Games
- Appearances: 3 (first in 1996)
- Best result: (silver) 2nd (1 time, in 2004)

World Baseball Classic
- Appearances: 6 (first in 2006)
- Best result: 7th (1 time, in 2023)

World Cup
- Appearances: 9 (first in 1978)
- Best result: 5th (2 times, most recent in 2011)

Intercontinental Cup
- Appearances: 6 (first in 1981)
- Best result: (gold) 1st (1 time, in 1999)

Asian Championship
- Appearances: 8 (first in 1971)
- Best result: (bronze) 3rd (1 time, in 1975)

Oceania Championship
- Appearances: 1 (first in 2003)
- Best result: (gold) 1st (1 time, in 2003)

The Australian national baseball team, nicknamed the Southern Thunder,represents Australia in international baseball tournaments and competitions. It is ranked as the top team in Oceania, and is the Oceanian Champion, having been awarded the title in 2007 when New Zealand withdrew from the Oceania Baseball Championship. After achieving a last (16th) place in the 2013 World Baseball Classic, its rank dropped to 13, which is the lowest rank Australia ever received. The highest rank it has achieved is 6th, and its current rank is 8th.

The Australian team participated in the Summer Olympic Games in 1996, 2000, and 2004, but failed to qualify for 2008. The team has also participated in both of the other major international baseball tournaments recognised by the International Baseball Federation (IBAF): the Baseball World Cup and most recently the World Baseball Classic (WBC).

The team is controlled by the Australian Baseball Federation, which is represented in the Baseball Confederation of Oceania (BCO). Prior to the BCO's formation, Australia competed in the Asian Baseball Championship under the Baseball Federation of Asia (BFA). Australia continues to have a relationship with the BFA; the 2011 resumption of the Asia Series includes the Australian Baseball League's champion team. Team Australia came in 6th in the 12-team 2019 WBSC Premier12 Tournament, in November 2019.

The team competed in the 2026 World Baseball Classic in March 2026. The captains for the 2026 World Baseball Classic include Tim Kennelly and Warwick Saupold.

== Current roster ==
2026 World Baseball Classic roster
Players		Coaches
Pitchers: 30 Warwick Saupold; 46 Kieran Hall; 22 Mitch Neunborn; 8 Alex Wells; 55 Jon Kennedy; 26 Ky Hampton; 40 Samuel Holland; 37 Jack O'Loughlin; 65 Cooper Morgan; 39 Connor MacDonald; 54 Blake Townsend; 21 Todd Van Steensel; 19 Lachlan Wells; 38 Coen Wynne; 44 Josh Hendrickson	Catchers: 1 Mitchell Edwards; 9 Robbie Perkins; 10 Alex Hall; Infielders: 64 Travis Bazzana; 16 Curtis Mead; 43 Jarryd Dale; 6 Robbie Glendinning; 52 Rixon Wingrove; 4 Logan Wade; Outfielders: 25 Ulrich Bojarski; 23 Tim Kennelly; 34 Chris Burke; 2 Aaron Whitefield; 36 Max Durrington	Manager: 14 David Nilsson; Coaches: 32 Chris Adamson; 33 Jim Bennett; 27 Graeme Lloyd; 18 Michael Collins; 29 Jake Burns; 13 Shayne Watson; 17 Andrew Graham

== Results and fixtures ==
The following is a list of professional baseball match results currently active in the latest version of the WBSC World Rankings, as well as any future matches that have been scheduled.

Legend

Win Lose Void or postponed Fixture

=== 2024 ===
Friendly	17 February	Hanwha Eagles (South Korea)	2–1	Australia	Melbourne Ballpark, Australia
Friendly			Boxscore

WBSC Premier12 GS	13 November	Australia	3–9	Japan	Vantelin Dome Nagoya, Japan
WBSC Premier12 GS	19:00 UTC+9	LP: Lewis Thorpe; HR: Rixon Wingrove, Ulrich Bojarski	Boxscore	WP: Haruto Inoue	Attendance: 30,691

WBSC Premier12 GS	15 November	Dominican Republic	0–5	Australia	Tianmu Baseball Stadium, Taiwan
WBSC Premier12 GS	15:00 UTC+8	LP: Luis Vargas	Boxscore	WP: Coen Wynne; HR: Robbie Perkins	Attendance: 1,112

WBSC Premier12 GS	16 November	Australia	3–4	Cuba	Tianmu Baseball Stadium, Taiwan
WBSC Premier12 GS	12:00 UTC+8	LP: Blake Townsend; HR: Robbie Glendinning	Boxscore	WP: Andy Vargas; Sv: Raidel Martínez; HR: Yadir Drake	Attendance: 1,418

WBSC Premier12 GS	17 November	Chinese Taipei	11–3	Australia	Taipei Dome, Taiwan
WBSC Premier12 GS	18:30 UTC+8	WP: Chang Yi; HR: Lin Li, Giljegiljaw Kungkuan	Boxscore	LP: Mitch Neunborn; HR: Robbie Perkins, Solomon Maguire	Attendance: 34,166

WBSC Premier12 GS	18 November	Australia	2–5	South Korea	Tianmu Baseball Stadium, Taiwan
WBSC Premier12 GS	12:00 UTC+8	LP: Steven Kent	Boxscore	WP: So Hyeong-jun; Sv: Park Yeong-hyun; HR: Kim Do-yeong	Attendance: 1,799

=== 2026 ===
World Baseball Classic GS	5 March	Chinese Taipei	0–3	Australia	Tokyo Dome, Japan
World Baseball Classic GS	12:00 UTC+9	LP: Chen Po-yu	Boxscore	WP: Jack O'Loughlin; Sv: Jon Kennedy; HR: Robbie Perkins, Travis Bazzana	Attendance: 40,523; Umpires: Omar Peralta

World Baseball Classic GS	6 March	Australia	5–1	Czech Republic	Tokyo Dome, Japan
World Baseball Classic GS	12:00 UTC+9	WP: Josh Hendrickson; HR: Curtis Mead, Alex Hall	Boxscore	LP: Tomáš Ondra	Attendance: 21,514; Umpires: Ryan Additon

World Baseball Classic GS	8 March	Australia	3–4	Japan	Tokyo Dome, Japan
World Baseball Classic GS	19:00 UTC+9	LP: Jon Kennedy; HR: Alex Hall, Rixon Wingrove	Boxscore	WP: Chihiro Sumida; Sv: Taisei Ota; HR: Masataka Yoshida	Attendance: 42,331; Umpires: Chad Fairchild

World Baseball Classic GS	9 March	South Korea	7–2	Australia	Tokyo Dome, Japan
World Baseball Classic GS	19:00 UTC+9	WP: Son Ju-young; HR: Moon Bo-gyeong	Boxscore	LP: Lachlan Wells; HR: Robbie Glendinning	Attendance: 32,908; Umpires: David Rackley

== World ranking ==
In January 2009 the International Baseball Federation created a ranking system so that the nations involved in international competition could be compared independently. Teams receive points based on the position they finish at the end of tournaments. The system takes into account results not only of the senior men's teams but also of junior teams. Weightings that emphasise the importance of certain tournaments are based on the number of teams competing, the number of continents represented (or eligible to be represented), and in the case of continental tournaments such as the Oceania Baseball Championship the relative strength of teams eligible. Only results within the previous four years are used, so points are added and removed over time. Since the system began, the rankings have been adjusted after the completion of tournaments qualifying for the ranking process; the most recent was the 2009 Baseball World Cup.

When the rankings were first introduced, Australia was listed at 10th position. The high-water mark was after the 2009 World Baseball Classic when they were in 9th. The lowest position they have been in the ranking since its inception is 11th. At the end of 2010, Australia had returned to their original position of 10th.

Date Released	Tournament^{*}	Tournament Result	Ranking		Points		Position Above			Position Below		
Date Released	Tournament^{*}	Tournament Result	Ranking		Points		Rank	Team	Points Difference	Rank	Team	Points Difference
1 December 2010^{**}	2010 World Junior Championship	2nd	10th	Improved	226.83	Improved	9th	Mexico	+60.40	11th	Puerto Rico	−13.60
2 June 2010^{**}	†	†	11th	No change	211.24	No change	10th	Puerto Rico	+20.15	12th	Italy	−45.24
19 October 2009^{**}	2009 World Youth Championship	9th	11th	No change	211.24	Worsened	10th	Puerto Rico	+20.15	12th	Italy	-45.24
19 October 2009^{**}	2009 World Cup	5th	11th	No change	211.24	Worsened	10th	Puerto Rico	+20.15	12th	Italy	-45.24
12 August 2009^{**}	†	†	11th	Worsened	214.11	No change	10th	Puerto Rico	+1.28	12th	Panama	−1.79
24 March 2009	2009 World Baseball Classic	12th	9th	Improved	214.11	Improved	8th	Canada	+66.08	10th	Puerto Rico	−2.97
13 January 2009	†	†	10th	No change	191.43	No change	9th	Panama	+6.21	11th	Puerto Rico	−38.61

* – The tournaments that Australia participated in since the previous release of the rankings.
** – Multiple tournaments were held since the previous release of the rankings.
† – Denotes a rankings release that had no tournaments Australia participated in.

== International competition ==
In January 2009 the IBAF, in releasing the first edition of the world rankings, announced the classifications of various tournaments that contributed to the rankings themselves. In doing so, they identified that of the "world" tournaments, there were different levels with differing levels of weighting towards the ranks: major world championships, minor world championships, world qualifying tournaments and continental championships/qualifying tournaments.

=== Major world championships ===
There are currently three recognised tournaments that are considered "major" by the IBAF: the World Baseball Classic, the Summer Olympic Games and the Baseball World Cup. Of those, the Summer Olympics will be phased out of the rankings structure, as baseball will no longer be contested as an Olympic event.

==== World Baseball Classic ====
Australia has competed in all four editions of the World Baseball Classic. All sixteen teams that played in the 2006 edition were invited to compete in the second in 2009. By virtue of their third-place finish in their first-round pool, Australia qualified compete at the 2013 edition of the WBC.; however, they were eliminated with an 0–3 record and finished in last place overall.

Australia, which has not progressed beyond the first round of competition, achieved its highest finish, 9th, in the 2017 tournament. Unusual for international competition in baseball, the squads selected in the World Baseball Classic tournaments featured players active in Major League Baseball in addition to Minor League, Nippon Professional Baseball and local players. Generally players in the Major Leagues are unavailable for international representative teams due to their contracts with the respective clubs.

World Baseball Classic record							Qualification record			
Year	Round	Position	W	L	RS	RA	W	L	RS	RA
(United States) 2006	Round 1	13th	0	3	4	18	No qualifiers held			
(Mexico) 2009	Round 1	12th	1	2	22	28	No qualifiers held			
(Taiwan) 2013	Round 1	16th	0	3	2	14	Automatically qualified			
(Japan) 2017	Round 1	9th	1	2	15	8	3	0	27	7
(Japan) 2023	Quarterfinals	7th	3	2	32	23	Automatically qualified			
(Japan) 2026	Round 1	9th	2	2	13	12	Automatically qualified			
Total	Quarterfinals	6/6	7	14	88	103	3	0	27	7

Australian World Baseball Classic Record by opponent
Opponent	Tournaments met	W-L record	Largest victory		Largest defeat		Current streak
Opponent	Tournaments met	W-L record	Score	Tournament	Score	Tournament	Current streak
China	2	2–0	11–0 (F/8)	Japan 2017	–		W2
Chinese Taipei	2	1–1	3–0	Japan 2026	4–1	Taiwan 2013	W1
Cuba	3	0–3	–		4–3	Japan 2017 & 2023	L3
Czech Republic	2	2–0	8–3	Japan 2023	–		W2
Dominican Republic	1	0–1	–		6–4	United States 2006	L1
Italy	1	0–1	–		10–0 (F/7)	United States 2006	L1
Japan	3	0–3	–		7–1	Japan 2023	L3
Mexico	1	1–1	17–7 (F/8)	Mexico 2009	16–1 (F/6)	Mexico 2009	L1
Netherlands	1	0–1	–		4–1	Taiwan 2013	L1
South Korea	3	1–2	8–7	Japan 2023	6–0	Taiwan 2013	L1
Venezuela	1	0–1	–		2–0	United States 2006	L1
Overall	6	7–14	Against CHN		Against MEX		L2
Overall	6	7–14	11–0 (F/8)	Japan 2017	16–1 (F/6)	Mexico 2009	L2

Australian World Baseball Classic Qualifiers Record by opponent
Opponent	Tournaments met	W-L record	Largest victory		Largest defeat		Current streak
Opponent	Tournaments met	W-L record	Score	Tournament	Score	Tournament	Current streak
Philippines	1	1–0	11–1 (F/7)	Australia 2017	–		W1
South Africa	1	2–0	12–5	Australia 2017	–		W2
Overall	1	3–0	Against PHI		–		W3
Overall	1	3–0	11–1 (F/7)	Australia 2017	–	–	W3

===== 2006 (United States) =====
Prior to formally starting their campaign, Australia played an exhibition game, which they lost, against a Boston Red Sox squad at City of Palms Park in Fort Myers, Florida. This was also the site of their training camp.

Australia competed in Pool D—along with Dominican Republic, Italy and Venezuela—in the first round at Cracker Jack Stadium in Orlando, Florida. The other three teams were able to field a large number of Major League players. Of players born outside the United States on 2006 Major League Opening Day rosters, the Dominican Republic (85) and Venezuela (43) had more than all other countries and between them accounted for more than 57% of foreign-born players in the leagues. Italy is among the top nations in Europe and had access to Italian-American players under the eligibility rules for the tournament. Thus, Australia was considered the underdog in the pool.

Having failed to win any of their round-robin pool games, they finished last in their pool, and were eliminated with Canada, China, Chinese Taipei, Italy, Netherlands, Panama and South Africa. The eventual champions were Japan.

2006 WBC Results

7 March; 1st Round, Pool D – Game 2	Italy	10–0 (F/7)	Australia	United States Cracker Jack Stadium; Attendance: 8,099
7 March; 1st Round, Pool D – Game 2		Boxscore		United States Cracker Jack Stadium; Attendance: 8,099

9 March; 1st Round, Pool D – Game 5	Australia	0–2	Venezuela	United States Cracker Jack Stadium; Attendance: 10,111
9 March; 1st Round, Pool D – Game 5		Boxscore		United States Cracker Jack Stadium; Attendance: 10,111

10 March; 1st Round, Pool D – Game 6	Dominican Republic	6–4	Australia	United States Cracker Jack Stadium; Attendance: 11,083
10 March; 1st Round, Pool D – Game 6		Boxscore		United States Cracker Jack Stadium; Attendance: 11,083

===== 2009 (Mexico) =====
Australia was based in Peoria, Arizona—the site of the Seattle Mariners spring training camp—for their preparation for the formal start of their 2009 campaign. Unlike 2006, in which they had one exhibition game, they competed against three different Major League clubs: the Seattle Mariners, the Milwaukee Brewers and the Chicago White Sox. Their game against Seattle was Ken Griffey Jr.'s first game playing for the Mariners since October 1999, and was also their first victory as part of a World Baseball Classic tour.

Australia was drawn in Pool B for the 2009 tournament, along with Cuba, Mexico and South Africa, competing at Foro Sol Stadium in Mexico City. After beating Mexico in their opening game, they lost their next two games to Cuba and Mexico, and were eliminated from the tournament. The Australians set a WBC record against Mexico: 22 hits in a single game is more than any other team has achieved in either tournament.

2009 WBC Results

8 March; 1st Round, Pool B – Game 2	Mexico	7–17 (F/8)	Australia Australia	Mexico Foro Sol; Attendance: 20,821
8 March; 1st Round, Pool B – Game 2		Boxscore		Mexico Foro Sol; Attendance: 20,821

10 March; 1st Round, Pool B – Game 4	Australia Australia	4–5	Cuba	Mexico Foro Sol; Attendance: 13,396
10 March; 1st Round, Pool B – Game 4		Boxscore		Mexico Foro Sol; Attendance: 13,396

11 March; 1st Round, Pool B – Game 5	Australia Australia	1–16 (F/6)	Mexico	Mexico Foro Sol; Attendance: 16,718
11 March; 1st Round, Pool B – Game 5		Boxscore		Mexico Foro Sol; Attendance: 16,718

===== 2013 (Taiwan) =====
In June 2011, it was announced that the field for the 2013 WBC would be expanded to include an additional 12 teams and that a qualifying round would be several months prior to the main tournament. The qualifying tournament involved the 12 newly invited teams, as well as the four lowest-placed teams from the 2009 tournament; all teams who did not win a game. The qualifying tournament broke the teams into four pools of four teams each, which competed in a six-game, modified double-elimination format, similar to the first round of the 2009 tournament, with the winners of the sixth game in each pool proceeding to the main tournament. Australia, having finished 12th after beating Mexico in their first game in 2009, automatically qualified for the main tournament.

The main tournament combined elements of both previous WBC editions. The first round was split all teams into four pools, where the teams competed in a round-robin, as was the case in the 2006 tournament. The second round used the same modified double-elimination format as used in the 2009 tournament and the 2013 qualifying tournament. The final round was contested in the same manner as both previous tournaments: the top two teams from each group in the second round qualifying for the two semi-final matches, the winners of which played in the championship game.

Australia was drawn into Pool B, which was held at the Taichung Intercontinental Baseball Stadium in Taiwan. In their opener, they fell to host and qualifiers Chinese Taipei, 4–1. They followed up with a 6–0 loss to South Korea before finishing with a 4–1 defeat to the Netherlands.

2013 WBC Results

Pool B Game 1

2 March 12:30 (UTC+08:00) at Taiwan Taichung Intercontinental Baseball Stadium
Team	1	2	3	4	5	6	7	8	9	R	H	E
Australia	0	0	0	0	0	0	1	0	0	1	5	0
Chinese Taipei	1	0	2	0	1	0	0	0	X	4	10	0
WP: Wang Chien-Ming (1–0) LP: Chris Oxspring (0–1) Sv: Chen Hung-Wen (1); Home runs: Australia: Stefan Welch (1); TPE: Peng Cheng-Min (1); Attendance: 20,035

Game 4

4 March 18:30 (UTC+08:00) at Taiwan Taichung Intercontinental Baseball Stadium
Team	R	H	E
South Korea	6	–	–
Australia	0	–	–

Game 5

5 March 12:30 (UTC+08:00) at Taiwan Taichung Intercontinental Baseball Stadium
Team	R	H	E
Australia	1	–	–
Netherlands	4	–	–

Australia roster – 2013 World Baseball Classic
Final roster		Provisional roster	Coaching staff
Pitchers Right-handed pitchers: 23 Timothy Kennelly; Shane Lindsay; 35 Chris Oxspring; 6 Andrew Russell ^{†}; 38 Dushan Ruzic ^{†}; 30 Warwick Saupold ^{*}; 33 Ryan Searle; 19 Matthew Williams ^{†}; 28 Brendan Wise; Left-handed pitchers: 10 Adam Bright; 25 Steven Kent ^{†}; 18 Ryan Rowland-Smith ^{†}; 44 Clayton Tanner ^{†}; 36 Brad Thomas	Catchers: 11 Allan de San Miguel ^{†}; 7 Matthew Kennelly; Infielders: 9 James Beresford; 12 Brad Harman; 20 Luke Hughes; 3 Mike Walker ^{*}; 22 Stefan Welch; Outfielders: 5 Corey Adamson ^{*}; 17 Mitch Dening ^{†}; 26 Justin Huber; 34 David Kandilas ^{†}; Josh Roberts ^{*}; 14 Chris Snelling; Utility players: 4 Josh Davies ^{†}	58 Peter Moylan	Manager: Jon Deeble; Coaches: Philip Dale (Pitching coach); Glenn Williams (Hitting coach); Michael Collins (Assistant coach); Tony Harris (Assistant coach); Graeme Lloyd (Assistant coach); Greg Jelks (Assistant coach)

* – Player has not played for Australia in international competition prior to 2013 WBC
† – Player did not play for Australia in WBC prior to 2013

===== 2017 (Japan) =====
Australia went 1–2 in pool play, losing to Cuba for a chance to advance to the second round of the 2017 WBC.

===== 2023 (Japan) =====
Australia advanced to the WBC quarterfinals for the first time in 2023, defeating the Czech Republic in an elimination game in its final pool game. Cuba defeated Australia in the quarterfinals, 4–3.

===== 2026 (Japan) =====
Australia will compete against Japan, South Korea, and the Czech Republic in the 2026 WBC in Toyko.

==== Olympic Games ====
Australia was the third nation, after the United States and Sweden, to participate in baseball at the Summer Olympics, making their first appearance at the 1956 Games in Melbourne, and again as part of its demonstration at the 1988 Games in Seoul.

Since baseball was first included as a medal sport at the 1992 Games in Barcelona, Australia has participated in three of the five tournaments. The best result achieved was in the 2004 Games in Athens, where Australia lost the gold medal match to Cuba to receive silver. Their medal tally puts them at 5th, equal to Chinese Taipei. (Note: The 5th-placed ranking is based both on the most medals received in total, and on the most gold medals, then silver, then bronze.)

Australia did not send a team to the 2020 Olympics qualifiers.

Summer Olympics record								Qualification
Year	Round	Position	W	L	%	RS	RA	Qualification
(Australia) 1956	Exhibition only		0	1	.000	5	11	No qualifiers held
(South Korea) 1988	Preliminary	5th (tie)	1	2	.333	10	20	Invited (Note: Cuba originally qualified but withdrew as a result of its boycott; Nicaragua, Mexico and Italy had senior rights, but were unable to field a team on short notice.)
(Spain) 1992	Did not qualify							Did not qualify
(United States) 1996	Preliminary	7th	2	5	.286	47	86	Oceania Baseball Championship; defeated Africa Cup Champion
(Australia) 2000	Preliminary	7th	2	5	.286	30	41	Qualified as hosts
(Greece) 2004	Finals	2nd	5	4	.556	52	36	Oceania Baseball Championship; defeated Africa Cup Champion
(China) 2008	Did not qualify							Did not qualify
(Japan) 2020	Did not qualify							Withdrew from qualifying tournament
Total (Note: Totals only include years 1992 to 2008, during which baseball was an official medal sport.)	Finals	3/6	9	14	.391	129	163	

==== World Cup ====
Australia participated in ten IBAF World Cup tournaments. Its best result was fifth, achieved in the two most recent tournaments held—2009 and 2011. At the 2007 tournament, Trent Oeltjen became the first Australian player to be named in a World Cup All Star team, in recognition of his tournament-leading hitting and base-running statistics.

Until 1986, the World Cup was known as the "Amateur World Series". The Amateur World Series only made use of round-robin fixtures, with teams ranked at the end of the tournament. Australia's first appearance was in Italy in 1978. Out of the ten teams to compete, Australia finished 9th ahead of the other debuting team, Belgium.

Beginning with the 1988 tournament, it used the "World Cup" name, with the IBAF recognising the past Amateur World Series winners as World Cup winners. With the change of name came a change in format for the tournament: a round-robin phase, followed by a knockout phase for the top four teams. (Later tournaments would see two pools used in the first phase, and an expanded knockout phase including the top four teams from each pool.) In the "World Cup Era", Australia has reached the final phase four times, finishing 7th in 1998, 6th in 2007 and most recently 5th in 2009 and 2011.

Baseball World Cup record							Qualification record			
Year	Round	Position	W	L	RS	RA	W	L	RS	RA
1938 to 1976	Did not participate						Did not participate			
(Italy) 1978	–	9th	–	–	–	–	No qualifiers held			
(Japan) 1980	–	7th	4	7	–	–	No qualifiers held			
(South Korea) 1982	–	9th	2	7	–	–	No qualifiers held			
1984 to 1990	Did not participate						Did not participate			
(Nicaragua) 1994	First round	9th	3	4	54	47	Oceanian qualifier			
(Italy) 1998	Quarterfinals	7th	6	4	71	54	Oceanian qualifier			
(Taiwan) 2001	First round	10th	3	4	24	32	Oceanian qualifier			
(Cuba) 2003	Did not qualify						Did not qualify			
(Netherlands) 2005	First round	10th	4	4	41	26	Oceanian qualifier			
(Taiwan) 2007	Quarterfinals	6th	7	3	61	29	Oceanian qualifier			
(Czech Republic) (Netherlands) (Italy) 2009	Third round	5th	9	6	96	64	Oceanian qualifier			
(Panama) 2011	Third round	5th	7	5	56	57	Oceanian qualifier			
Total	Quarterfinals	10/39	45	44	403	309	–	–	–	–

==== Premier12 ====
Australia came in sixth in the 12-team 2019 WBSC Premier12 tournament and seventh in the 2024 Premier12. The team has qualified for the opening round of the 2027 Premier12.

=== Minor world championships ===
There are six separate tournaments that the IBAF currently recognises as "minor world championships". Of those, Australia has only participated in one senior tournament: the Intercontinental Cup. (Australia has also participated in the World Junior Baseball Championship and the World Youth Baseball Championship, both of which are also included in the same category for the IBAF rankings.)

==== Intercontinental Cup ====
Australia is one of five nations to have won the Intercontinental Cup, winning the 1999 tournament by beating Cuba 4–3 in extra innings in front of a home crowd in Sydney. It was the first time Australia had won an international baseball tournament, and through 2009 the only win outside of the Oceania Baseball Championship. The team enjoyed several individual successes as well:

- Dave Nilsson named tournament MVP, to go along with leading the tournament for runs batted in (12) and being named in the tournament all-star team (as catcher)
- Shayne Bennett led the tournament pitching with the best win–loss record (3–0)
- Adam Burton led the tournament batting with the most runs scored (9)
- Michael Moyle shared the lead in the tournament with Oscar Macias (Cuba), with the most home runs (3)
- two other Australians were selected along with Dave Nilsson in the all-star team: Adrian Meagher (right-handed pitcher) and Michael Moyle (designated hitter)

It was only the third time Cuba had been beaten in the gold medal match in the tournament's history, having reached the tournament decider every time they have participated. Australia also shares another honour with Cuba: of the nine nations to have hosted the tournament, only Australia and Cuba have won as hosts, combining for five tournament wins from five times hosted. (Cuba in 1979, 1987, 1995 and 2002, Australia in 1999.)

Australia first participated in the tournament at the 1981 Intercontinental Cup, managing only one win out of their seven games, finishing 8th. Missing the 1983 Intercontinental Cup, they returned in 1985 to repeat their previous performance: 1 win, 8th-place finish. They would not reappear at the tournament until 1993 where they improved to a 5–4 record to finish in 6th position. Australia's first medal performance at the Intercontinental Cup (and their first medal at a world tournament) was at the 1997 tournament. In their best performance through the preliminary round, they put together a 6–1 record losing only to eventual silver-medalists Cuba, and beating eventual gold-medalists Japan. They lost to Japan in the semi-final, but beat the United States for the second time in the tournament to secure the bronze.

Australia also competed in the most recent tournament in 2006. There they finished in 5th position, compiling a 3–4 record. This is likely to be the last edition of the tournament for the foreseeable future.

=== Continental tournaments ===
Australia is the second of only two nations to have participated in IBAF-sanctioned continental tournaments for more than one continent: the Asian Baseball Championship between 1971 and 1993, and the Oceania Baseball Championship since 2003. The first nation to achieve this was Guam, who competed in the Asian tournament within the same timeframe as Australia, though they were involved in the first Oceania tournament in 1999.

==== Asian Baseball Championship ====
Australia is one of thirteen nations to have participated in the Asian Baseball Championship since the tournament was first held in 1954. The last time they contested the championship was in 1993, as a result of joining the newly formed Baseball Confederation of Oceania. Though their best result was a bronze medal in the 1975, the only teams to consistently finish ahead of Australia were Japan, South Korea and Chinese Taipei—the top three teams in Asia, and all in the top five in the world.

==== Oceania Baseball Championship ====
Though scheduled to participate on three separate occasions, Australia has only contested the Oceania Baseball Championship once in 2003. The two other times, Australia's scheduled opponents—Guam in 2004 and New Zealand in 2007—withdrew from competition in the lead up to each series, both times scheduled to be held in Sydney. Australia was awarded the championship both times, and as a result represented Oceania at the 2004 Summer Olympics (Note: To compete at the 2004 Summer Olympics as Oceania Champion, Australia also had to defeat South Africa in a final qualifying series.) and at the 2007 Baseball World Cup respectively.

Held during late April 2003, Australia won its first continental championship, beating hosts Guam 12–1, 12–1 and 5–1 to win the best of five series three games to one. (Guam won the third game 8–2.)

== See also ==
- Australian Baseball Federation
- World Baseball Classic
- Summer Olympic Games
- Baseball World Cup

== Footnotes ==
Olympic Games

Oceania Baseball Championship

== Bibliography ==
- Bjarkman, Peter C. (2005). Diamonds Around the Globe: The Encyclopedia of International Baseball. Westport, Connecticut: Greenwood Press. ISBN 0-313-32268-6. OCLC 58806121.
- Cava, Pete (Summer 1992). "Baseball in the Olympics" (PDF). The ISOH Journal. 1 (1). International Society of Olympic Historians. Archived (PDF) from the original on 7 September 2008.
- Cuyàs, Romà (1992). Official Report of the Games of the XXV Olympiad Barcelona 1992: Volume IV – The Games (PDF). Barcelona, Spain: Comite Organizador Olimpico Barcelona '92 (COOB'92) (Barcelona Olympic Organising Committee '92 in English). ISBN 84-7868-106-X.
