= Blake Townsend =

Australian baseball player (born 2001)

Free agent
- Relief pitcher
- Born: 5 April 2001 (age 25); Traralgon, Victoria, Australia
- Bats: Left Throws: Left
- Stats at Baseball Reference

Blake Andrew Townsend (born 5 April 2001) is an Australian professional baseball pitcher who is a free agent.

== Career ==
=== Seattle Mariners ===
Townsend signed with the Seattle Mariners as an international free agent on 19 June 2018. He made his professional debut in 2019 with the rookie-level Arizona League Mariners. Townsend did not play in a game in 2020 due to the cancellation of the minor league season because of the COVID-19 pandemic.

Townsend returned to action in 2021 with the rookie-level Arizona Complex League Mariners and High-A Everett AquaSox, posting an 0-1 record and 4.11 ERA with 26 strikeouts over five games (three starts). He split the 2022 campaign between the ACL Mariners, the Single-A Modesto Nuts, Everett, and the Triple-A Tacoma Rainiers. In 20 appearances for the four affiliates, Townsend accumulated a 2-2 record and 4.60 ERA with 37 strikeouts across 29 1/3 innings pitched.

In 2023, Townsend made 35 appearances out of the bullpen for Modesto, registering a 4-3 record and 3.38 ERA with 55 strikeouts and one save across 48 innings of work. He began the 2024 season with Everett, recording a 2.45 ERA with 30 strikeouts in 28 appearances. Townsend was released by the Mariners organization on 5 August 2024.

=== Pittsburgh Pirates ===
On 21 August 2024, Townsend signed a minor league contract with the Pittsburgh Pirates organization. He made five appearances down the stretch for the Double-A Altoona Curve, posting a 1-0 record and 2.00 ERA with six strikeouts over nine innings of work. Townsend elected free agency following the season on 4 November.

On 12 February 2025, Townsend re-signed with the Pirates organization on a new minor league contract. He made 34 appearances (12 starts) split between the Triple-A Indianapolis Indians, Altoona, and the High-A Greensboro Grasshoppers, accumulating an 8-4 record and 1.76 ERA with 81 strikeouts and one save over 92 innings of work. Townsend elected free agency following the season on 6 November.

=== Texas Rangers ===
On 23 January 2026, Townsend signed a minor league contract with the Texas Rangers. He elected free agency on November 2.

== International career ==
Townsend represented the Australia national baseball team in the 2023 World Baseball Classic, pitching in Australia's game against Japan.
