= Robbie Glendinning =

Australian baseball player (born 1995)

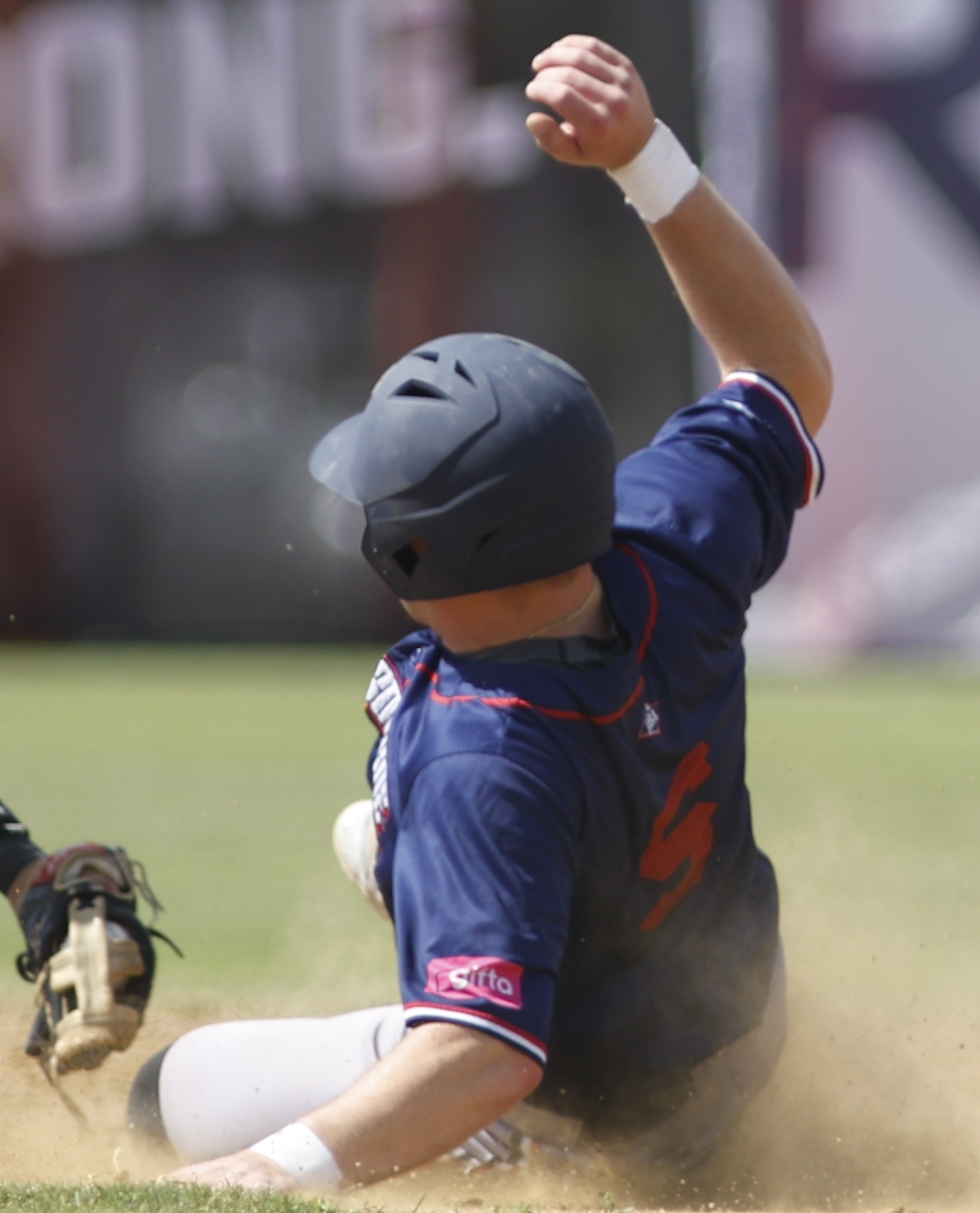
- Glendinning with the Melbourne Aces in 2024

Kansas City Monarchs – No. 15
- Infielder
- Born: 6 October 1995 (age 30); Perth, Australia
- Bats: Right Throws: Right

Robert Glendinning (born 6 October 1995) is an Australian professional baseball third baseman for the Kansas City Monarchs of the American Association of Professional Baseball. He played for the Australian national baseball team in the 2023 and 2026 World Baseball Classic.

== Amateur career ==
Glendinning is from Scarborough, Western Australia. He enrolled at North Iowa Area Community College and played college baseball there for two seasons. He transferred to the University of Missouri and continued his college baseball career with the Missouri Tigers. In 2016, he played collegiate summer baseball with the Wareham Gatemen of the Cape Cod Baseball League.

== Professional career ==
=== Pittsburgh Pirates ===
The Pittsburgh Pirates selected Glendinning in the 21st round, with the 628th overall selection, of the 2017 Major League Baseball draft. He made his professional debut with the Low-A West Virginia Black Bears, hitting .198 in 29 games. He spent the 2018 season split between the Black Bears and the Single-A West Virginia Power, slashing .268/.360/.381 with 2 home runs and 29 RBI across 59 cumulative games. In 2019, Glendinning split time between the High-A Bradenton Marauders and Double-A Altoona Curve. In 101 total contests, he batted .298/.368/.488 with career-highs in home runs (13), RBI (57), and stolen bases (8).

He did not play in the United States in 2020 after the season was cancelled due to the COVID-19 pandemic, but played for the Perth Heat in the 2020–21 Australian Baseball League season. On 11 February 2021, it was announced that Glendinning would require Tommy John surgery after suffering a complete tear of his ulnar collateral ligament while playing catch during a practice. The procedure caused him to miss the entire 2021 season. On 21 February 2022, Glendinning was released by the Pirates organization.

=== Kansas City Royals ===
On 22 February 2022, Glendinning signed a minor league contract with the Kansas City Royals organization. He spent the season with the Double-A Northwest Arkansas Naturals, playing in 118 games and hitting .252/.373/.439 while setting new career-highs in home runs (19), RBI (76), and stolen bases (11).

He began the 2023 season with Double-A Northwest Arkansas. In 26 games for the Naturals, Glendinning batted .242/.373/.363 with 2 home runs and 16 RBI.

=== Baltimore Orioles ===
On 18 May 2023, the Royals traded Glendinning to the Baltimore Orioles in exchange for cash considerations, The Orioles subsequently assigned him to the Triple-A Norfolk Tides. In 33 games for Norfolk, he batted .248/.331/.476 with 6 home runs and 16 RBI. Glendinning was released by the Orioles organization on 7 August.

=== Philadelphia Phillies ===
On 8 August 2023, Glendinning signed a minor league contract with the Philadelphia Phillies organization. He played in five games for the Double–A Reading Fightin Phils, going 5–for–16 (.313) with no home runs, two RBI, and four walks. Glendinning elected free agency following the season on 6 November.

=== Olmecas de Tabasco ===
On 11 April 2024, Glendinning signed with the Olmecas de Tabasco of the Mexican League. In three games for Tabasco, Glendinning went 0–for–6 and struck out twice.

=== Bravos de León ===
On 22 April 2024, Glendinning was traded to the Bravos de León of the Mexican League. In 19 games for León, Glendinning batted .255/.359/.546 with three home runs and 12 RBI.

=== Caliente de Durango ===
On 20 May 2024, Glendinning and Sam Travis were traded to the Caliente de Durango in exchange for Alberth Martínez. In 19 games, he batted .288/.381/.452 with 11 hits and 11 RBI. On 17 June, Glendinning was released by Durango.

=== Kansas City Monarchs ===
On 3 January 2025, Glendinning signed with the Kansas City Monarchs of the American Association of Professional Baseball. In 87 games he hit .256/.367/.472 with 18 home runs, 71 RBIs and 15 stolen bases.

== International career ==
Glendinning played for Team Australia in the 2023 and 2026 World Baseball Classic.

== Personal life ==
Glendinning's brother, Cameron, played college baseball for the University of New Orleans.
