= Tim Kennelly (baseball) =

Australian baseball player (born 1986)

Perth Heat – No. 23
- Third baseman / Outfielder / Catcher
- Born: 5 December 1986 (age 39); Perth, Australia
- Bats: Right Throws: Right
- Stats at Baseball Reference

Timothy James Kennelly (born 5 December 1986) is an Australian professional baseball player for the Perth Heat of the Australian Baseball League. Primarily an outfielder and third baseman, Kennelly spent a significant portion of his career also as a catcher.

He current holds the record for all-time hits (426), runs (275), runs batted in (226), plate appearances (1637) and at-bats (1432) in the Australian Baseball League as of 1 January 2023.

== Career ==
Kennelly signed to the Philadelphia Phillies in 2005 as a third baseman through the Major League Baseball Australian Academy Program where he had a good debut season with the GCL Phillies batting .295 and slugging .420.

He debuted as a 19-year-old for the Western Australia Heelers in 2006 Claxton Shield as a utility. Due to a torn labrum, he missed the 2006 minor league season. In the 2008 Claxton Shield Final, Tim and his brother starred for Western Australia as they won the Claxton Shield. They made it two in a row the following year in the 2009 Claxton Shield. Back in America, Kennelly had a break-out year, being promoted to the Reading Phillies, and batted .256/.338/.393 and named as the DH for the Florida State League postseason All-Star team.

== Australian national team ==
Kennelly was selected for the Australia national baseball team at the 2009 Baseball World Cup, 2013 World Baseball Classic, 2017 World Baseball Classic, 2018 exhibition games against Japan, 2019 WBSC Premier12, 2023 World Baseball Classic,and the 2026 World Baseball Classic.

His efforts were recognised by being selected on the roster for the 2009 Baseball World Cup for the Australia.

On 20 February 2018, he was selected exhibition series against Japan.

On 8 October 2019, he was selected at the 2019 WBSC Premier12.

== Personal life ==
He is the son of Mike Kennelly, a 16-year PGA veteran and also the older brother of Matt Kennelly, who plays minor league baseball for the Atlanta Braves organisation. Kennelly is a keen supporter of Australian Rules Football, which he had to give up playing to chase his dream of professional baseball.

Off of the field, Kennelly works as a firefighter.
