= Andrew Marck =

New Zealand baseball player

- Outfield
- Born: 19 November 1989 (age 36); Auckland, New Zealand
- Batted: Right Threw: Right

ABL debut
- 4 November, 2011, for the Brisbane Bandits

Last appearance
- 30 December, 2022, for the Auckland Tuatara

ABL statistics
- Batting Average: .304
- Runs batted in: 15
- Runs: 13
- Win–loss record: 0-1
- Earned run average: 8.44
- Strikeouts: 6

Teams
- Brisbane Bandits (2011-2012); Auckland Tuatara (2018- 2023)

Andrew Marck (born 19 November 1989) is a New Zealand Australian Baseball League outfielder and first baseman for the Auckland Tuatara of the Australian Baseball League.

== Career ==
Marck has won New Zealand Player of the Year five consecutive times. He has represented the New Zealand Diamondblacks in the World Baseball Classic qualifiers and previously played for New Zealand at junior level as well as at the U23 Australian National Championships, where he recorded a 2.00 ERA and a .308 batting average. He has been named MVP of New Zealand’s National Club Championship three times and has led his teams to seven national titles.

In 2011, while playing for the Carina Redsox in the Greater Brisbane League, Marck was selected to the Brisbane Bandits 22-man roster and made his debut against the Canberra Cavalry on 4 November, pitching two scoreless innings of relief. He finished the season with eight appearances.

After the ABL season, Marck joined the London Majors of the Intercounty Baseball League (IBL) in Canada, serving exclusively as a pitcher. Over 95 innings, he posted a 2.56 ERA with 92 strikeouts, becoming one of the club’s most reliable arms. A highlight of his season was a complete-game win over the Barrie Baycats featuring 12 strikeouts.

After returning to New Zealand, Marck joined the inaugural Auckland Tuatara roster for the 2018–19 Australian Baseball League season, hitting .250 in limited plate appearances as a first baseman and designated hitter. In the 2019–20 season, he led the league in batting average through the first five rounds, hitting .412, and finished with a .333 season average.

Marck holds multiple Auckland Tuatara franchise records, including the club’s highest career batting average and the single-season on-base percentage record. He holds the record for the most hits. He was also voted the ABL League Fan Choice MVP.

=== Coaching ===
Alongside his playing career, Marck has coached New Zealand national teams across a wide range of age groups. He has been involved in developing players at junior, youth, and senior levels, and most recently served as head coach of the New Zealand U12 National Team at the Baseball World Cup, guiding the country’s youngest elite athletes on the international stage.
