= 2022–23 Australian Baseball League season =

Sports tournament

- League: Australian Baseball League
- Sport: Baseball
- Duration: 10 November 2022 – 5 February 2023
- Teams: 8

Regular season

Postseason
- Champions: Adelaide Giants
- Runners-up: Perth Heat

Seasons
- ← 2021–22 2023–24 →

The 2022–23 Australian Baseball League season was the twelfth season of the Australian Baseball League (ABL). After the COVID-19 pandemic cancelled the 2021–22 season and reduced the 2020–21 season to six teams, this season was the first in three years not to feel the impact of the COVID-19 pandemic on sports. The regular season began on 10 November 2022 and concluded on 22 January 2023 with the Adelaide Giants winning the Claxton Shield over the Perth Heat. This season was the last season to feature Auckland Tuatara and Geelong-Korea, with both teams folding at the conclusion of the season.

== Teams ==
Both the Auckland Tuatara and Geelong-Korea returned to the competition for the first time since the 2019–20 Australian Baseball League season. The Tuatara purchased the National Basketball League team the Auckland Huskies, who now go by the same name.

Teams in the ABL
Team	State / Territory/ Country	Stadium
Adelaide Giants	South Australia	Diamond Sports Stadium
Auckland Tuatara	New Zealand	North Harbour Stadium
Brisbane Bandits	Queensland	Holloway Field
Canberra Cavalry	Australian Capital Territory	Narrabundah Ballpark
Geelong-Korea	Victoria	Geelong Baseball Park
Melbourne Aces	Victoria	Melbourne Ballpark
Perth Heat	Western Australia	Baseball Park
Sydney Blue Sox	New South Wales	Blue Sox Stadium

== Regular season ==
The league returned to a 10-round, 40 game schedule, with teams playing division rivals eight times and inter-division teams four times.

Auckland, Brisbane, Canberra and Sydney grouped into the "Northeast Division" with Adelaide, Geelong, Melbourne and Perth grouped into the "Southwest Division".

Scheduled doubleheaders consist of a seven inning game followed by a nine inning game. The league uses the WBSC tiebreaker rule for all games going beyond the 9th inning, or extra innings beginning less than one hour before a curfew.

Baxter Field was previously announced to be hosting the first Australian Baseball League All-Star Game since 2017, but was delayed due to the damage caused by the 2022 eastern Australia floods.

Milestones during the regular season included Tim Atherton becoming the first pitcher to 400 strikeouts. The first Canberra Cavalry player to 300 games for Robbie Perkins and the first Brisbane Bandits player to 350 games for Andrew Campbell.

The Adelaide Giants broke the win streak record with 12 games between 24 November and 10 December 2022. Trent D'Antonio broke the record for most career appearances on 8 January 2023 with 387 games. Dae-sung Koo who held the record for the oldest player to play in the ABL when he pitched an inning for Geelong-Korea at age 48 in 2018, came back out of retirement to break his own record, pitching a scoreless inning against at age 53.

T.J. Bennett broke the single-season homerun record with 17 homeruns, a record he previously held with 16 alongside Kellin Deglan and Donald Lutz.

=== Standings ===
Key
Secured Semi-finals berth

Northeast Division
Pos	Team	W	L	Pct.	GB
1	Brisbane Bandits	30	10	.750	-
2	Auckland Tuatara	17	17	.500	10.0
3	Canberra Cavalry	18.5	19	.493	10.25
4	Sydney Blue Sox	12.5	27	.316	17.25

The game between Canberra Cavalry and Sydney Blue Sox scheduled for Sunday 23 January was rained out before play could begin. Because that was the last Sunday of the regular season, the game could not be rescheduled, and both teams were awarded a half win per the League's rules.

Southwest Division
Pos	Team	W	L	Pct.	GB
1	Adelaide Giants	25	15	.625	-
2	Perth Heat	23	17	.575	2.0
3	Melbourne Aces	15	21	.417	8.0
4	Geelong-Korea	13	27	.325	12.0

=== Statistical leaders ===
Batting leaders
Stat	Player (Note: Minimum 2.7 PAs per team game.)	Team	Total
AVG	Alex Hall	Perth Heat	.360
HR	T.J. Bennett	Brisbane Bandits	17
RBI	T.J. Bennett	Brisbane Bandits	42
R	T.J. Bennett	Brisbane Bandits	36
H	Pete Kozma; Erny Ordonez	Perth Heat; Sydney Bluesox	41
SB	Jake Mackenzie	Canberra Cavalry	16

Pitching leaders
Stat	Player (Note: Minimum 0.8 IP per team game.)	Team	Total
W	Tim Atherton; Brock Gilliam; Sam Holland	Brisbane Bandits; Perth Heat; Brisbane Bandits	5
L	Josh Guyer	Sydney Bluesox	6
ERA	Jordan Fowler	Adelaide Giants	1.63
K	Gunnar Kines	Perth Heat	61
IP	Gunnar Kines	Perth Heat	56 2/3
SV	James Meeker	Brisbane Bandits	11

=== Awards ===
Season awards
Award	Player	Team	Ref
Helms Award (MVP)	Alex Hall	Perth Heat	
Postseason MVP	Jordan McCardle	Adelaide Giants	
Pitching Champion	Gunnar Kines	Perth Heat	
Hitting Champion	T.J. Bennett	Brisbane Bandits	
Reliever of the Year	James Meeker	Brisbane Bandits	
Defensive Player of the Year	Tyler Tolbert	Brisbane Bandits	
Rookie of the Year	Liam Spence	Adelaide Giants	

== Postseason ==
The playoffs will see four teams compete in two rounds. The semi-final round saw the winner of each division host the runner-up of the other division in a best-of-three series. The winners of each semi-final will compete in a best-of-three final round, with the first game being hosted by the lower seed and the remaining games hosted by the higher seed. This format is similar to that used for the 2017–18 season.

Semi-final Series
1	Brisbane Bandits	1
2	Perth Heat	2
1	Adelaide Giants	2
2	Auckland Tuatara	1

Championship Series
W-A	Perth Heat	1
W-B	Adelaide Giants	2

=== Semi-Final: Brisbane Bandits (NE1) vs Perth Heat (SW2) ===
Brisbane Bandits hosted Perth Heat for a best-of-three semi-final at Viticon Stadium (Holloway Field). Brisbane won the first game, but Perth won the remaining two to secure a place in the finals.

27 January 2023; 18:00 (UTC+10:00); Game 1	Brisbane Bandits	3-2	Perth Heat	(Queensland) Holloway Field, Brisbane; Attendance: 1,650; Umpires: HP: Paul Latta. 1B: Matthew Pearson. 2B: Tom West. 3B: Ben Nash.
27 January 2023; 18:00 (UTC+10:00); Game 1	WP: David Huff (1-0); Sv: James Meeker (S, 1)	Boxscore	LP: Tyler Beardsley (0-1)	(Queensland) Holloway Field, Brisbane; Attendance: 1,650; Umpires: HP: Paul Latta. 1B: Matthew Pearson. 2B: Tom West. 3B: Ben Nash.
27 January 2023; 18:00 (UTC+10:00); Game 1		Boxscore	HR: Ulrich Bojarski (1)	(Queensland) Holloway Field, Brisbane; Attendance: 1,650; Umpires: HP: Paul Latta. 1B: Matthew Pearson. 2B: Tom West. 3B: Ben Nash.

28 January 2023; 18:00 (UTC+10:00); Game 2	Brisbane Bandits	4-14	Perth Heat	(Queensland) Holloway Field, Brisbane; Attendance: 1,825; Umpires: HP: Matthew Pearson. 1B: Tom West. 2B: Ben Nash. 3B: Paul Latta.
28 January 2023; 18:00 (UTC+10:00); Game 2	LP: Tim Atherton (0-1)	Boxscore	WP: Gunnar Kines (1-0)	(Queensland) Holloway Field, Brisbane; Attendance: 1,825; Umpires: HP: Matthew Pearson. 1B: Tom West. 2B: Ben Nash. 3B: Paul Latta.
28 January 2023; 18:00 (UTC+10:00); Game 2	HR: Dai-Kang Yang (1)	Boxscore	HR: Ulrich Bojarski (2), Will Simoneit (1), Jake Bowey (1), Connor Owings (1)	(Queensland) Holloway Field, Brisbane; Attendance: 1,825; Umpires: HP: Matthew Pearson. 1B: Tom West. 2B: Ben Nash. 3B: Paul Latta.

29 January 2023; 14:00 (UTC+10:00); Game 3	Brisbane Bandits	8-10	Perth Heat	(Queensland) Holloway Field, Brisbane; Attendance: 852; Umpires: HP: Tom West. 1B: Ben Nash. 2B: Paul Latta. 3B: Matthew Pearson.
29 January 2023; 14:00 (UTC+10:00); Game 3	LP: Cameron Wagoner (0-1)	Boxscore	WP: Will Sherriff (1-0); Sv: Connor Higgins (S, 1)	(Queensland) Holloway Field, Brisbane; Attendance: 852; Umpires: HP: Tom West. 1B: Ben Nash. 2B: Paul Latta. 3B: Matthew Pearson.
29 January 2023; 14:00 (UTC+10:00); Game 3		Boxscore	HR: Ulrich Bojarski (3), Jake Bowey 2 (3), Caminero (1)	(Queensland) Holloway Field, Brisbane; Attendance: 852; Umpires: HP: Tom West. 1B: Ben Nash. 2B: Paul Latta. 3B: Matthew Pearson.

=== Semi-Final: Adelaide Giants (SW1) vs Auckland Tuatara (NE2) ===
Adelaide Giants hosted Auckland Tuatara for a best-of-three semi-final at Diamond Sports Stadium. Game 2 was postponed and moved to the next day due to rain, resulting in double-header being played. Adelaide won the first and third games to secure a place in the final against Perth.

27 January 2023; 19:05 (UTC+10:30); Game 1	Adelaide Giants	5-3	Auckland Tuatara	(South Australia) Bennett Field, Adelaide; Attendance: 1,145; Umpires: HP: Trent Thomas. 1B: Ryan Harder. 2B: Blake Halligan. 3B: Andrew Bell.
27 January 2023; 19:05 (UTC+10:30); Game 1	WP: Austin Ross (1-0); Sv: Adam McKillican (S, 1)	Boxscore	LP: Chase Walter (0-1)	(South Australia) Bennett Field, Adelaide; Attendance: 1,145; Umpires: HP: Trent Thomas. 1B: Ryan Harder. 2B: Blake Halligan. 3B: Andrew Bell.
27 January 2023; 19:05 (UTC+10:30); Game 1		Boxscore	HR: Jake Bowey 2 (5),	(South Australia) Bennett Field, Adelaide; Attendance: 1,145; Umpires: HP: Trent Thomas. 1B: Ryan Harder. 2B: Blake Halligan. 3B: Andrew Bell.

29 January 2023; 14:00 (UTC+10:30); Game 2	Adelaide Giants	0-2	Auckland Tuatara	(South Australia) Bennett Field, Adelaide; Attendance: 614; Umpires: HP: Ryan Harder. 1B: Andrew Bell. 2B: Trent Thomas. 3B: Ian Reval.
29 January 2023; 14:00 (UTC+10:30); Game 2	WP: Dylan Unsworth (0-1)	Boxscore	LP: Toru Murata (1-0)	(South Australia) Bennett Field, Adelaide; Attendance: 614; Umpires: HP: Ryan Harder. 1B: Andrew Bell. 2B: Trent Thomas. 3B: Ian Reval.
29 January 2023; 14:00 (UTC+10:30); Game 2		Boxscore	HR: Matt Feinstein (1)	(South Australia) Bennett Field, Adelaide; Attendance: 614; Umpires: HP: Ryan Harder. 1B: Andrew Bell. 2B: Trent Thomas. 3B: Ian Reval.

29 January 2023; 18:00 (UTC+10:30); Game 3	Adelaide Giants	4-2	Auckland Tuatara	(South Australia) Bennett Field, Adelaide; Attendance: 811; Umpires: HP: Trent Thomas. 1B: Blake Halligan. 2B: Andrew Bell. 3B: Ryan Harder.
29 January 2023; 18:00 (UTC+10:30); Game 3	WP: Luke Wilkins (1-0); Sv: Adam McKillican (S, 2)	Boxscore	LP: Ryo Kohigashi (0-1)	(South Australia) Bennett Field, Adelaide; Attendance: 811; Umpires: HP: Trent Thomas. 1B: Blake Halligan. 2B: Andrew Bell. 3B: Ryan Harder.

=== Final: Adelaide Giants (SW1) vs Perth Heat (SW2) ===
Adelaide Giants and Perth Heat played a best-of-three final. The first game was hosted by Perth at Empire Ballpark, and the remaining games were hosted by Adelaide at Diamond Sports Stadium.

Adelaide and Perth last faced each other in the final of the 2014–15 Australian Baseball League season, when Perth won the Claxton Shield. Despite Adelaide making the final four times since the ABL's inaugural season in 2010–11, a team from South Australia has not won the Claxton Shield since 1980.

Perth won the first game, but Adelaide won the second and third games and consequently the final, ending South Australia's 43-year Claxton Shield drought.

Adelaide-born Jordan McArdle was named the Postseason MVP, hitting three home runs across in both of the Giants' Championship Series wins.

03 February 2023; 19:00 (UTC+08:00); Game 1	Perth Heat	9-5	Adelaide Giants	(Western Australia) Empire Ballpark, Perth; Attendance: 3,426; Umpires: HP: Paul Latta. 1B: Trent Thomas. 2B: Tom West. 3B: Matthew Pearson.
03 February 2023; 19:00 (UTC+08:00); Game 1	WP: Tyler Beardsley (1-1)	Boxscore	LP: Jordan Fowler (0-1)	(Western Australia) Empire Ballpark, Perth; Attendance: 3,426; Umpires: HP: Paul Latta. 1B: Trent Thomas. 2B: Tom West. 3B: Matthew Pearson.

04 February 2023; 19:00 (UTC+10:30); Game 2	Adelaide Giants	9-5	Perth Heat	(South Australia) Bennett Field, Adelaide; Attendance: 2,540; Umpires: HP: Trent Thomas. 1B: Tom West. 2B: Matthew Pearson. 3B: Paul Latta
04 February 2023; 19:00 (UTC+10:30); Game 2	WP: Mitch Neunborn (1-0)	Boxscore	LP: Gunnar Kines (1-1)	(South Australia) Bennett Field, Adelaide; Attendance: 2,540; Umpires: HP: Trent Thomas. 1B: Tom West. 2B: Matthew Pearson. 3B: Paul Latta
04 February 2023; 19:00 (UTC+10:30); Game 2	HR: Jordan McArdle 2 (2), Quincy Latimore (1), Jared Carr (1), Jarryd Rogers (1)	Boxscore	HR: Jake Bowey 2 (5),	(South Australia) Bennett Field, Adelaide; Attendance: 2,540; Umpires: HP: Trent Thomas. 1B: Tom West. 2B: Matthew Pearson. 3B: Paul Latta

05 February 2023; 18:00 (UTC+10:30); Game 3	Adelaide Giants	5-2	Perth Heat	(South Australia) Bennett Field, Adelaide; Attendance: 2,036; Umpires: HP: Tom West. 1B: Matthew Pearson. 2B: Paul Latta. 3B: Trent Thomas.
05 February 2023; 18:00 (UTC+10:30); Game 3	WP: Adam McKillican (1-0); Sv: Todd Van Steensel (S, 1)	Boxscore	LP: Brock Gilliam (0-1)	(South Australia) Bennett Field, Adelaide; Attendance: 2,036; Umpires: HP: Tom West. 1B: Matthew Pearson. 2B: Paul Latta. 3B: Trent Thomas.
05 February 2023; 18:00 (UTC+10:30); Game 3	HR: Jordan McArdle (3)	Boxscore		(South Australia) Bennett Field, Adelaide; Attendance: 2,036; Umpires: HP: Tom West. 1B: Matthew Pearson. 2B: Paul Latta. 3B: Trent Thomas.
