= 2018–19 Australian Baseball League season =

- League: Australian Baseball League
- Sport: Baseball
- Duration: 15 November 2018 – 3 February 2019
- Games: 160
- Teams: 8

Regular season
- Season MVP: Timothy Kennelly; Marcus Solbach

Championship Series
- Champions: Brisbane Bandits (4th title)
- Runners-up: Perth Heat

Seasons
- ← 2017–18 2019–20 →

The 2018–19 Australian Baseball League season was the ninth year Australian Baseball League (ABL) season, and was held from 15 November 2018 to 2 February 2019. It was the first season that it was played with eight teams, as the league expanded for the first time. The Brisbane Bandits won the championship for the fourth consecutive season.

== Teams ==
Teams in the ABL
Team	State / Territory	Stadium
Adelaide Bite	South Australia	Diamond Sports Stadium
Auckland Tuatara	New Zealand	McLeod Park
Brisbane Bandits	Queensland	Holloway Field
Canberra Cavalry	Australian Capital Territory	Narrabundah Ballpark
Geelong-Korea	Victoria	Geelong Baseball Park
Melbourne Aces	Victoria	Melbourne Ballpark
Perth Heat	Western Australia	Baseball Park
Sydney Blue Sox	New South Wales	Blue Sox Stadium

== Regular season ==
With the addition of the Auckland Tuatara and Geelong-Korea as expansion teams, the competition was split into a 'Northeast' and 'Southwest' division. The league retained a 10-round, 40 game schedule, with teams playing division rivals eight times and inter division teams four times.

Key
Secured Semi-finals berth
Secured Wild Card berth

Northeast Division
Pos	Team	W	L	Pct.	GB	Home	Away
1	Brisbane Bandits	25	15	.625	1.0	12–8	13–7
2	Sydney Blue Sox	25	15	.625	–	14–6	11–
3	Canberra Cavalry	23	17	.575	2.0	13–7	10–10
4	Auckland Tuatara	14	26	.350	11.0	8–12	6–14

Southwest Division
Pos	Team	W	L	Pct.	GB	Home	Away
1	Perth Heat	24	16	.600	–	12–8	12–8
2	Melbourne Aces	23	17	.575	1.0	14–6	9–11
3	Adelaide Bite	19	21	.475	5.0	10–10	9–11
4	Geelong-Korea	7	33	.175	17.0	4–16	3–17

=== Statistical leaders ===
Batting leaders
Stat	Player (Note: Minimum 2.7 PAs per team game.)	Team	Total
AVG	Gift Ngoepe	Sydney Blue Sox	.437
HR	T.J. Bennett	Brisbane Bandits	13
RBI	Tristan Gray	Perth Heat	41
R	Tristan Gray Tim Kennelly	Perth Heat Perth Heat	38
H	Dwayne Kemp	Sydney Blue Sox	55
SB	D.J. Burt	Melbourne Aces	18

Pitching leaders
Stat	Player (Note: Minimum 0.8 IP per team game.)	Team	Total
W	Tim Atherton Josh Guyer Steve Kent	Brisbane Bandits Sydney Blue Sox Canberra Cavalry	7
L	Jin-U Kim	Geelong-Korea	8
ERA	Shota Imanaga	Canberra Cavalry	0.51
K	Alex Maestri	Sydney Blue Sox	78
IP	Markus Solbach	Adelaide Bite	65 1/3
SV	Todd Van Steensel	Sydney Blue Sox	10

== Postseason ==
A new playoff structure was announced 29 August 2018 with the addition of a single wild card game between the fourth and fifth seeds prior to two rounds of best-of-three finals series.

The top seed awarded to the team with the best regular season record, with the other division winner awarded the second seed. The third and fourth seed were awarded to the two divisional runner ups with the fifth seed being given to the team with the next best season record.

Wild Card
4	Melbourne Aces	0
5	Canberra Cavalry	1

Semi-finals series
1	Brisbane Bandits	2
5	Canberra Cavalry	1
2	Perth Heat	2
3	Sydney Blue Sox	1

Championship Series
1	Brisbane Bandits	2
2	Perth Heat	0

=== Championship Series ===
31 January 2019; 19:00 (UTC+08:00); Game 1	Perth Heat	2-3	Brisbane Bandits	(Western Australia) Baseball Park, Perth; Attendance: 2,870; Umpires: HP: Brett Robson. 1B: Paul Latta. 2B: Ryan Harder. 3B: Tom West. LF: Peter Bowie. RF: Lou Bonomi.
31 January 2019; 19:00 (UTC+08:00); Game 1	LP: John Anderson (0-1)	Boxscore	WP: Ryan Bollinger (1-0); Sv: Ryan Searle (1)	(Western Australia) Baseball Park, Perth; Attendance: 2,870; Umpires: HP: Brett Robson. 1B: Paul Latta. 2B: Ryan Harder. 3B: Tom West. LF: Peter Bowie. RF: Lou Bonomi.

02 February 2019; 18:00 (UTC+10:00); Game 2	Brisbane Bandits	9-4	Perth Heat	(Queensland) Holloway Field, Brisbane; Attendance: 2,304; Umpires: HP: Paul Latta. 1B: Ryan Harder. 2B: Tom West. 3B: Brett Robson. LF: James Shields. RF: Gavin Carson.
02 February 2019; 18:00 (UTC+10:00); Game 2	WP: Tim Atherton (1-0)	Boxscore	LP: Connor Lourey (0-1)	(Queensland) Holloway Field, Brisbane; Attendance: 2,304; Umpires: HP: Paul Latta. 1B: Ryan Harder. 2B: Tom West. 3B: Brett Robson. LF: James Shields. RF: Gavin Carson.
02 February 2019; 18:00 (UTC+10:00); Game 2	HR: T.J Bennett (1), Wade Dutton (1), Andrew Campbell (1)	Boxscore	HR: Pete Kozma (1), Robbie Glendenning 2 (2), Chris Clare (1)	(Queensland) Holloway Field, Brisbane; Attendance: 2,304; Umpires: HP: Paul Latta. 1B: Ryan Harder. 2B: Tom West. 3B: Brett Robson. LF: James Shields. RF: Gavin Carson.
