= Allan de San Miguel =

Australian baseball player and coach (born 1988)

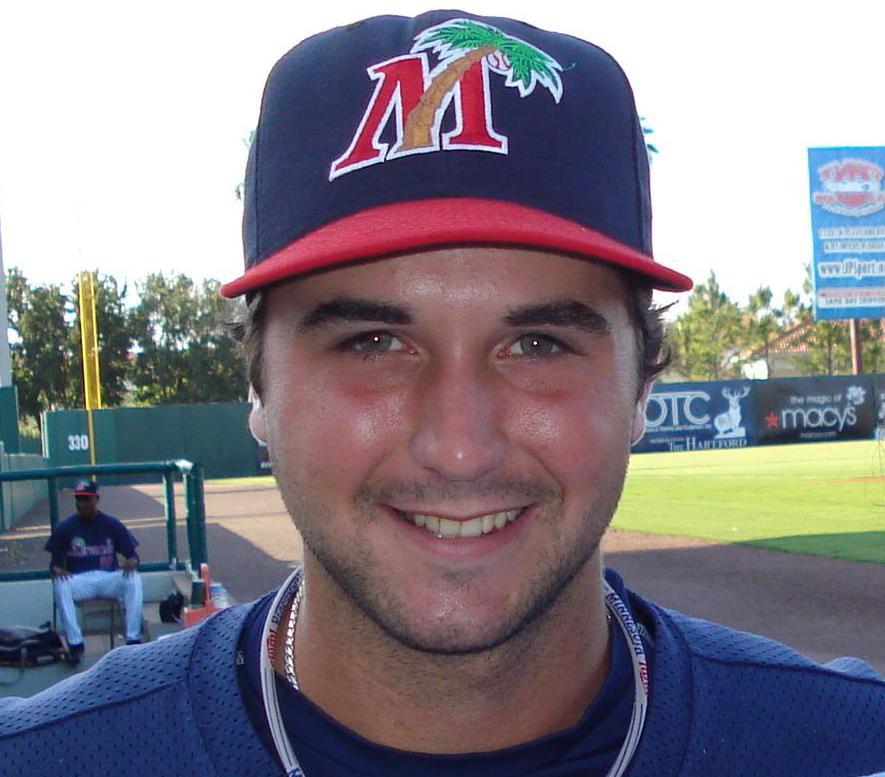
- de San Miguel with the Fort Myers Miracle

Kansas City Royals – No. 80
- Coach
- Born: 1 February 1988 (age 38); Bentley, Western Australia, Australia
- Bats: Right Throws: Right
- Stats at Baseball Reference

Teams
- Kansas City Royals (2022–present)

Allan Murray de San Miguel (born 1 February 1988) is an Australian former professional baseball catcher. He is currently a coach with the Kansas City Royals. De San Miguel was previously a manager for the Melbourne Aces of the Australian Baseball League following a long career with the Australian national baseball team, both the Perth Heat and Melbourne Aces in the Australian Baseball League and various minor league baseball teams.

De San Miguel was the most capped player in the Australian Baseball League, holding the record for the most games played with 386 when he retired following the 2019–20 Australian Baseball League season. His record was surpassed by Trent D'Antonio in 2023 and again by Tim Kennelly 15 December 2023.

== Playing career ==
=== Minnesota Twins ===
De San Miguel attended South Fremantle Senior High School in Perth, Western Australia before signing with the Minnesota Twins organization as an undrafted free agent on August 18, 2004. He split time between all levels of the Twins organization, from Rookie League to Triple–A, as an organizational catcher until the Twins released him from the New Britain Rock Cats in 2011.

=== Baltimore Orioles ===
On January 9, 2012, de San Miguel signed a minor league contract with the Baltimore Orioles following a strong showing in the ABL. He split time between the High–A Frederick Keys, Double–A Bowie Baysox, and Triple–A Norfolk Tides, batting .239/.331/.399 with six home runs in 63 games. He was invited to Spring Training with the Orioles in 2013, and spent the entire season in High–A Frederick, batting .240/.366/.421 with 10 home runs in 65 games. He elected free agency on November 4, 2013.

=== Southern Maryland Blue Crabs ===
On January 13, 2014, de San Miguel signed a minor league contract with the Colorado Rockies. He was released before the season started on March 27. He spent the 2014 season as the starting catcher for the Southern Maryland Blue Crabs of the independent Atlantic League of Professional Baseball. He batted .203/.289/.332 with five home runs in 61 games for the Blue Crabs.

=== Minnesota Twins (second stint) ===
On January 12, 2015, de San Miguel returned to the Twins organization, but appeared in only 3 games for the Triple–A Rochester Red Wings before suffering an injury. He elected free agency on November 6, 2015.

=== Kansas City Royals ===
On February 11, 2016, de San Miguel signed a minor league contract with the Kansas City Royals, batting .187/.248/.264 in 30 games between the Triple–A Omaha Storm Chasers and Double–A Northwest Arkansas Naturals. The following year he hit .237/.310/.333 in 34 games. In 2018 and 2019, he was still signed as a player with the Royals, but rarely activated as a player on the phantom injured list. He made no appearances in either season before electing free agency on November 4, 2019.

On January 10, 2020, de San Miguel signed a new minor league deal with the Kansas City Royals and was assigned to Double–A Northwest Arkansas. On July 4, de San Miguel was added to the 60-man player pool. On November 2, de San Miguel elected free agency. On February 3, 2021, de San Miguel re-signed with the Royals on a minor league contract.

=== Australian Baseball League ===
De San Miguel was the starting catcher for the Perth Heat of the Australian Baseball League for six seasons from 2010 through 2015. In 2016, he joined the Melbourne Aces. He is a career .270/.382/.452 hitter with 39 home runs in 279 games in the ABL. He is a four-time ABL Champion with the Heat, who won in 2010–11, 2011–12, 2013–14, 2014–15, and with the Melbourne Aces in 2019-20 and 2020-21 as a manager. de San Miguel was named MVP of the 2014-15 Championship Series.

Records that belonged to de San Miguel when he retired following the 2019–20 Australian Baseball League season include games (386), plate appearances (1560), at-bats (1300), runs batted in (214), hit by pitch (39), as well as strikeouts (294), and grounded into double play (42).

During the 2022–23 Australian Baseball League season, Tim Kennelly (baseball) broke his plate appearance, at-bats and RBI records. Trent D'Antonio broke his all-time games record, before Kennelly also passed it in the 2022–23 Australian Baseball League season

=== Australian national team ===
In 2009, he was a provisional member of the Australia national baseball team at the 2009 World Baseball Classic. Australia was eliminated in the first round of the tournament and placed 12th of 16 teams with a record of 1–2. De San Miguel did not play in the tournament.

In 2013, he returned with the team for the 2013 World Baseball Classic, for which Australia automatically qualified. Australia finished in last place out of sixteen teams, having lost three games in the first round to Chinese Taipei, South Korea, and the Netherlands. De San Miguel went 0-for-3 with a strikeout against Korea, and replaced Matt Kennelly late in the game against the Netherlands, striking out in his only appearance.

In 2016, de San Miguel caught for Australia in the 2017 World Baseball Classic – Qualifier 1, which occurred February 11–14, 2016. Australia defeated the Philippines and South Africa twice to advance in the tournament. He appeared in all three games, going 2-for-11 with a walk and a strikeout.

De San Miguel returned in 2017 to compete in the World Baseball Classic with the Australia national baseball team. Australia was eliminated in the first round, losing to both Japan and Cuba. De San Miguel had a strong series, going 5-for-9 with one walk and three strikeouts. He hit a solo home run off of Tomoyuki Sugano in the second inning of the first game against Japan.

In 2018, he was selected exhibition series against Japan.

On October 8, 2019, he was selected at the 2019 WBSC Premier12.

== Coaching career ==
The Royals announced that they hired de San Miguel to their major league coaching staff as a strategist and bullpen catcher before the 2022 season.
