= Andrew Campbell (outfielder) =

Australian baseball player (born 1992)

- Outfielder
- Born: February 18, 1992 (age 34); Ipswich, Australia
- Bats: Left Throws: Right
- Stats at Baseball Reference

Career highlights and awards
- CPBL Home Run Derby winner (2018)

Andrew Thomas Campbell (born 18 February 1992), nicknamed Soupy, is an Australian professional baseball player for the Mannheim Tornados of the Baseball Bundesliga and the Brisbane Bandits of the Australian Baseball League (ABL). Campbell has played in all Australian Baseball League seasons for Brisbane.

== Career ==
An Ipswich Musketeers junior and senior player, Campbell represented Queensland at various Australia National Youth Championships before making his professional debut with the Brisbane Bandits in the team's first game 11 November 2010 as a defensive replacement.

Campbell signed with the Cleveland Indians prior to 2011 and played two seasons between the AZL Indians and Mahoning Valley Scrappers before being released at the conclusion of the 2012 season.

In the 2011–12 Australian Baseball League season, Campbell was the runner-up Rookie of the Year after slashing .301/.387/.376 in 26 games.

The Chinese Professional Baseball League invited Campbell and Brisbane and Australian teammate Logan Wade to the 2018 homerun derby where he won the title. His 2018-19 Australian Baseball League season was just as successful, hitting a career best line of .310/.415/.542 en route to the Bandits winning their fourth consecutive ABL Championship.

In 2019, Campbell signed with the Mannheim Tornados of Germany's Baseball Bundesliga for the 2019 season.

== International career ==
He was selected Australia national baseball team at the 2018 exhibition games against Japan, 2019 Canberra camp, and 2019 WBSC Premier12.

== See also ==
- CPBL Home Run Derby
