= 2026–27 Australian Baseball League season =

Professional baseball season in Australia

- League: Australian Baseball League
- Sport: Baseball
- Duration: 19 November 2026 – 30/31 January 2027
- Games: 39
- Teams: 4

Regular season
- Season champions: TBD

Postseason
- Venue: TBD

Seasons
- ← 2025–26 2027–28 →

The 2026–27 Australian Baseball League season is the sixteenth season of the Australian Baseball League (ABL). It is scheduled to begin on November 19 2026, and conclude in the Championship Series in late January 2027. The four-team competition is the premier English-speaking winter baseball league with players affiliated with Major League Baseball (MLB), Nippon Professional Baseball (NPB), KBO League, Chinese Professional Baseball League (CPBL), and various independent baseball leagues.

== Background ==
=== Format and schedule ===
The 2026–27 Australian Baseball League season will feature four teams, the Adelaide Giants, Brisbane Bandits, Perth Heat and Sydney Blue Sox, competing across a 10-week, 39-game regular season. The final two on the ABL standings at the conclusion of the regular season will advance to the Championship Series where the seasons minor premiers will host a best-of-three series, with the winner lifting the Claxton Shield.

Each team will host five series and travel for five series, with a series consisting of multiple games played between the same two teams over consecutive days, reducing the need for frequent travel between cities. The Boxing Day weekend series will feature three games rather than the traditional four, while the season will conclude with the ABLCS from January 29–31.

=== Teams ===
The teams remained unchanged from the previous season, following the withdrawal of the Canberra Cavalry just before the season began. Two new personnel changes were made ahead of the season: the Sydney Blue Sox appointed American Baseball Coaches Association (ABCA) hall-of-fame inductee Mike Roberts as their manager for the upcoming season, while the Perth Heat landed Lance Rymel.

Team	Location	Manager	Ref.
Adelaide Giants	Dicolor Australia Stadium	Landon Lassiter	
Brisbane Bandits	Viticon Stadium	Stuart Masters	
Perth Heat	Empire Ballpark	Lance Rymel	
Sydney Blue Sox	Blue Sox Stadium	Mike Roberts	

== Regular season ==
2026–27 Australian Baseball League season standings
Pos	Team	W	L	PCT	GB	Qualification
1	Adelaide Giants	0	0	—	—	Championship Series
2	Brisbane Bandits	0	0	—	—	Championship Series
3	Perth Heat	0	0	—	—	
4	Sydney Blue Sox	0	0	—	—	

Source: Australian Baseball League

== Postseason ==
=== Bracket ===
Championship Series
29–31 January 2027 – TBD
1
2
