= 2021–22 Australian Baseball League season =

Cancelled sports tournament

- League: Australian Baseball League
- Sport: Baseball
- Duration: 18 November 2021 – 6 February 2022
- Teams: 6

Seasons
- ← 2020–21 2022–23 →

The 2021–22 Australian Baseball League season was to be the twelfth season of the Australian Baseball League (ABL). The regular season was to be held from 18 November 2021 to 23 January 2022.

For the second consecutive season, the league was to be temporarily reduced to six teams, with Geelong-Korea and Auckland Tuatara impacted by international travel affected by the COVID-19 pandemic. Due to the impact of local COVID-19 restrictions, it was announced that the start of the season would be delayed to late-December. However on 22 October 2021, it was announced that the season had been cancelled in full due to COVID-19 interstate travel restrictions and lockdowns.

== Teams ==

Teams in the ABL
| Team | State / Territory/ Country | Stadium |
|---|---|---|
| Adelaide Giants | South Australia | Diamond Sports Stadium |
| Brisbane Bandits | Queensland | Holloway Field |
| Canberra Cavalry | Australian Capital Territory | Narrabundah Ballpark |
| Melbourne Aces | Victoria | Melbourne Ballpark |
| Perth Heat | Western Australia | Baseball Park |
| Sydney Blue Sox | New South Wales | Blue Sox Stadium |

== Regular season ==
The season was to include a 40 game schedule, consisting of ten series, with each team playing a four game home and away series against each other.

Baxter Field was previously announced to be hosting the first Australian Baseball League All-Star Game since 2017.

Scheduled doubleheaders consist of a seven inning game followed by a nine inning game. The league uses the WBSC tiebreaker rule for all games going beyond the 9th inning, or extra innings beginning less than one hour to a curfew.
