= Gift Ngoepe =

South African baseball player and coach (born 1990)

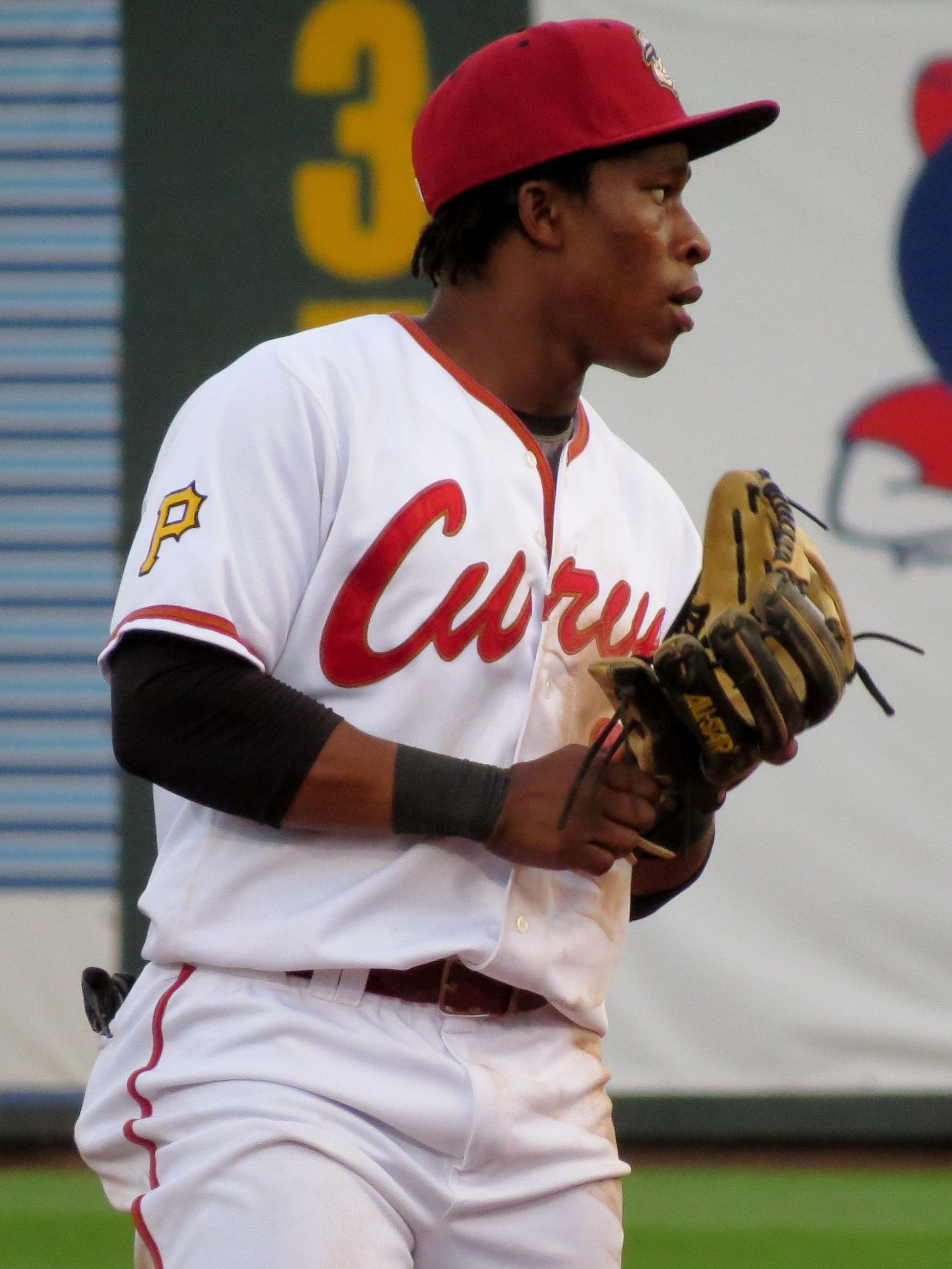
- Ngoepe with the Altoona Curve in 2015
- Shortstop / Second baseman / Coach
- Born: 18 January 1990 (age 36); Pietersburg, South Africa
- Bats: Right Throws: Right

MLB debut
- 26 April 2017, for the Pittsburgh Pirates

Last MLB appearance
- 1 May 2018, for the Toronto Blue Jays

MLB statistics
- Batting average: .181
- Home runs: 0
- Runs batted in: 6
- Stats at Baseball Reference

Teams
- Pittsburgh Pirates (2017); Toronto Blue Jays (2018)

Mpho' Gift Ngoepe (/mˈpoʊ ɡɪft ŋˈɡoʊpeɪ/ m-POH GIFT ng-GOH-pay; born 18 January 1990) is a South African former professional baseball shortstop and second baseman. He played in Major League Baseball (MLB) for the Pittsburgh Pirates in 2017 and Toronto Blue Jays in 2018. He was the first South African and the first native of continental Africa to reach the major leagues. He is currently the bench coach of the Hillsboro Hops.

== Professional career ==
=== Pittsburgh Pirates ===
A native of Randburg, Ngoepe became the first black South African, and the sixth South African to sign a professional baseball contract when he signed in October 2008. When Ngoepe was growing up, his mother was a clubhouse attendant for the Randburg Mets, and they lived in one of the clubhouse rooms. He was invited to Major League Baseball's academy in Tirrenia, Italy, where the Pirates signed him.

In 2009, Ngoepe played for the Rookie-level Gulf Coast League Pirates, and batted .238/.341/.281 with one home run, nine runs batted in (RBI), and 13 stolen bases in 47 games. He was a member of the South Africa national team at the 2009 World Baseball Classic. At the 2009 WBC, he hit consecutive triples off of Mexico's Elmer Dessens in a 14–3 loss to Mexico. On 10 August, Sports Illustrated published an article on Ngoepe covering how he started his baseball career, his upbringing, and time with the Pirates. In 2010, he played 64 games with the Short Season-A State College Spikes and two with the Advanced-A Bradenton Marauders, batting a combined .206/.316/.318 with one home run, 20 RBI, and 11 stolen bases.

Ngoepe played only 27 games in 2011 due to a hamate injury. He batted .297/.354/.440 with two home runs and five RBI before the injury.

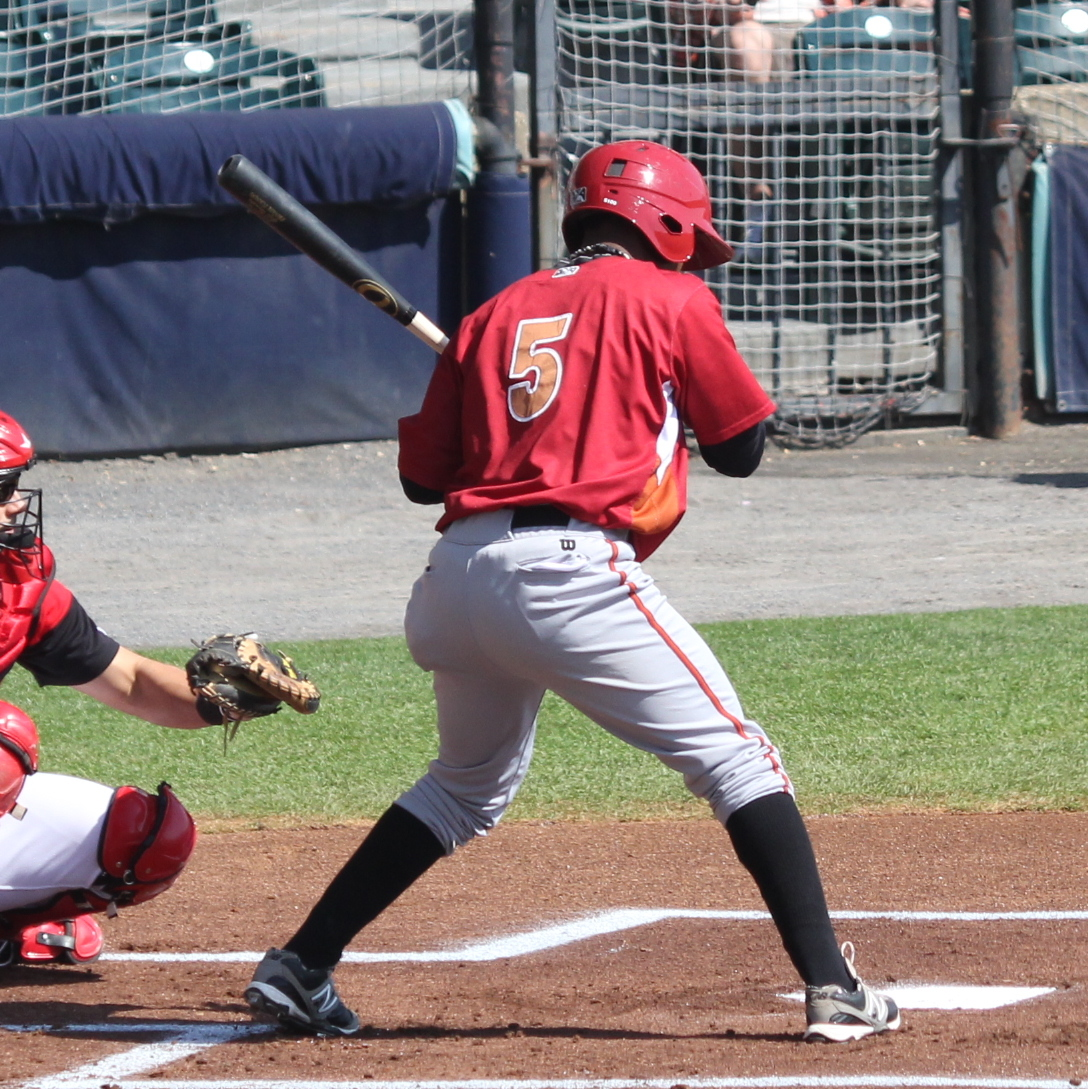
Ngoepe batting for the Altoona Curve in 2015

Ngoepe played the entire 2012 season with Bradenton. In 124 games played he hit .232/.330/.338 with nine home runs and 36 RBI and a career-high 22 stolen bases. He also played 16 games for the Scottsdale Scorpions of the Arizona Fall League (AFL). In 2013, he again began the season with Bradenton, playing 28 games and batting .292/.424/.427 before being promoted to the Double-A Altoona Curve, where he played 72 games. In Altoona, Ngeope batted .177/.278/.282 with three home runs, 16 RBI, and 10 stolen bases. He made his second trip to the AFL at the end of the season, playing 17 games for Scottsdale.

In 2014, Ngeope set career-highs in games played and RBI, playing 131 games with Altoona and batting .238/.319/.380 with nine home runs, 52 RBI, and 13 stolen bases. He was invited to 2015 spring training by the Pirates on 9 January 2015. He played for the Indianapolis Indians of the Triple-A International League in 2016.

On 26 April 2017, the Pirates promoted Ngoepe to the major leagues from Indianapolis. This made him the first continental African player, and the first player from an independent African nation, to reach the Major Leagues. (Note: Al Cabrera, who played for the St. Louis Cardinals in 1913, was born in the Canary Islands (geographically part of the African plate, but politically part of Spain).) Ngoepe made his Major League debut that day, and recorded his first career hit, a single off Cubs' starting pitcher Jon Lester. Because of time zone differences, Ngoepe's MLB debut fell on the early morning of 27 April in South Africa, observed in that country as Freedom Day, memorializing the 1994 election that was the first in which the country's black population was allowed to vote. In 2017 with Pittsburgh, he batted .222/.323/.296 in 28 games.

=== Toronto Blue Jays ===
On 20 November 2017, Ngoepe was traded to the Toronto Blue Jays for cash considerations or a player to be named later. He earned a spot on the active roster to begin the season but was optioned to the Triple-A Buffalo Bisons on 20 April, with whom he batted .168/.304/.252. With Toronto, he had one hit in 19 at bats. He was designated for assignment on 3 May. The Blue Jays released Ngoepe on 13 August.

=== Sydney Blue Sox ===
On 30 August 2018, Ngoepe signed with the Sydney Blue Sox of the Australian Baseball League (a winter league) for the 2018–19 season. He batted .357/.451/.700 and was named the defensive player of the year.

=== Philadelphia Phillies ===
On 11 January 2019, Ngoepe signed a minor league contract with the Philadelphia Phillies. He played for the Triple-A Lehigh Valley IronPigs, and batted .221/.296/.410 with 5 home runs and 21 RBIs in 122 at bats, playing second base, third base, and shortstop. He was released on 20 June.

=== Pittsburgh Pirates (second stint) ===
On 29 June 2019, Ngoepe signed a minor league contract with the Pittsburgh Pirates and was assigned to the Double-A Altoona Curve. He batted .100/.289/.100 in 30 at bats. He was released on 30 July.

=== Lancaster Barnstormers ===
On 6 August 2019, Ngoepe signed with the Lancaster Barnstormers of the independent Atlantic League of Professional Baseball. He batted .289/.317/.632 with three home runs and seven RBIs for them in 38 at bats, playing seven games at shortstop and four games at second base.

=== Sydney Blue Sox (second stint) ===
Ngoepe returned to the Sydney Blue Sox of the Australian Baseball League for the 2019–20 season.

=== Melbourne Aces ===
Ngoepe signed with the Melbourne Aces of the Australian Baseball League for the 2020–21 season. They won the Claxton Shield that season.

=== Québec Capitales ===
On 30 March 2021, Ngoepe signed with the Québec Capitales of the Frontier League. In 82 games he hit .281/.377/.464 with 9 home runs, 47 RBIs and 12 stolen bases.

Ngoepe retired as a player in January 2023.

== Coaching career ==
=== Newport Rams ===
On 16 March 2022, Ngoepe became a coach with the Newport Rams of Baseball Victoria.

=== Arizona Diamondbacks ===
On 6 March 2023, Ngoepe was announced as a coach for the Arizona Complex League Diamondbacks, the rookie-level affiliate of the Arizona Diamondbacks. On 8 January 2024, Ngoepe was named the manager for the ACL Diamondbacks. On 15 January 2025, Ngoepe was promoted to serve as the bench coach for the Single-A Visalia Rawhide. On 23 January 2026, Ngoepe was promoted to the bench coach of the High-A Hillsboro Hops.

== Personal life ==
Ngoepe is married and has a son. Ngoepe's younger brother, Victor, also played in the minor leagues with the Pirates.
