= David Sutherland (baseball) =

Australian baseball player

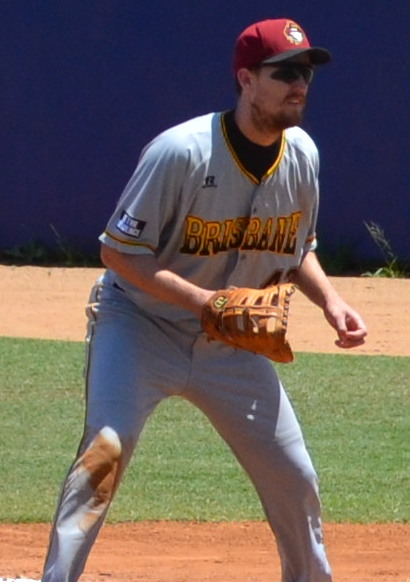
- Sutherland with the Brisbane Bandits in 2013

Brisbane Bandits – No. 43
- First baseman
- Born: 2 May 1985 (age 41); Brisbane, Australia
- Bats: Left Throws: Left
- Stats at Baseball Reference
Medals
Men's baseball
Representing Australia
Haarlem Baseball Week
Bronze medal – third place	2016 Haarlem	National team

David Andrew Sutherland (born 2 May 1985) is a former Australian professional baseball player who played for the Brisbane Bandits. Nicknamed Goofy due to his tall, uncoordinated looks, he is currently the most capped Brisbane player (379) and first player in the Australian Baseball League to accumulate 200 career hits, a feat he reached 5 November 2015.

== Career ==
After playing in the 2002 World Junior Baseball Championship for the Australian U18 national team, Sutherland was signed to the Los Angeles Dodgers at the age of 17. He later made his senior circuit debut at the 2003 Claxton Shield for the Queensland Rams and batted .375/.483/.500 in seven games.

In 2005, he had the best year of his young career, hitting a tournament best .474/.474/.526 in five games for Queensland in the 2005 Claxton Shield and .336/.422/.453 with 44 runs and 47 RBI in 66 Pioneer League games for the Ogden Raptors.

He was released by the Dodgers in 2007 after a season with the Great Lakes Loons.

Sutherland has played every season in the Australian Baseball League and is the all time leader for the Brisbane Bandits in many categories including games played, hits and home runs. He is also a part of the Australian national baseball team setup.

== International career ==
He was selected for the Australia national baseball team at the 2016 Haarlem Baseball Week, 2018 exhibition games against Japan and 2019 WBSC Premier12.
