= Melbourne Aces award winners and league leaders =

This is a list of award winners and league leaders for the Melbourne Aces professional baseball team of the Australian Baseball League.

== Rookie of the Year ==
Year	Winner	Position	Ref
2010-11	Cody McAbee	Outfield	
2011-12	Andy Mann	Pitcher	
2012-13			

== Offensive Player of the Year ==
Year	Winner	Position	Ref
2010-11	Yoshiyuki Kamei		
2011-12	Justin Huber	Out-Field	
2012-13			

== Pitcher of the Year ==
Year	Winner	Position	Ref
2010-11	Adam Bright	Pitcher	
2011-12	Nic Ungs	Pitcher	
2012-13			

== Golden Glove ==
Year	Winner	Position	Ref
2010-11	Cody McAbee	Outfield	
2011-12	Dominic Ramos	Short Stop	
2012-13			

== Most Valuable Player ==
Year	Winner	Position	Ref
2010-11	Andrew Russell		
2011-12	Brad Harman	2nd Base	
2012-13			

== General Manager's Award ==
Year	Winner	Position	Ref
2010-11	Peter Villani		
2011-12	Paul Housden	Grounds Keeper	
2012-13			

== Sponsor of the Year Award ==
Year	Winner	Position	Ref
2010-11	Not Awarded		
2011-12	Jet Couriers	Major Sponsor	
2012-13			
