= Steve Mintz =

American baseball player & coach (born 1968)

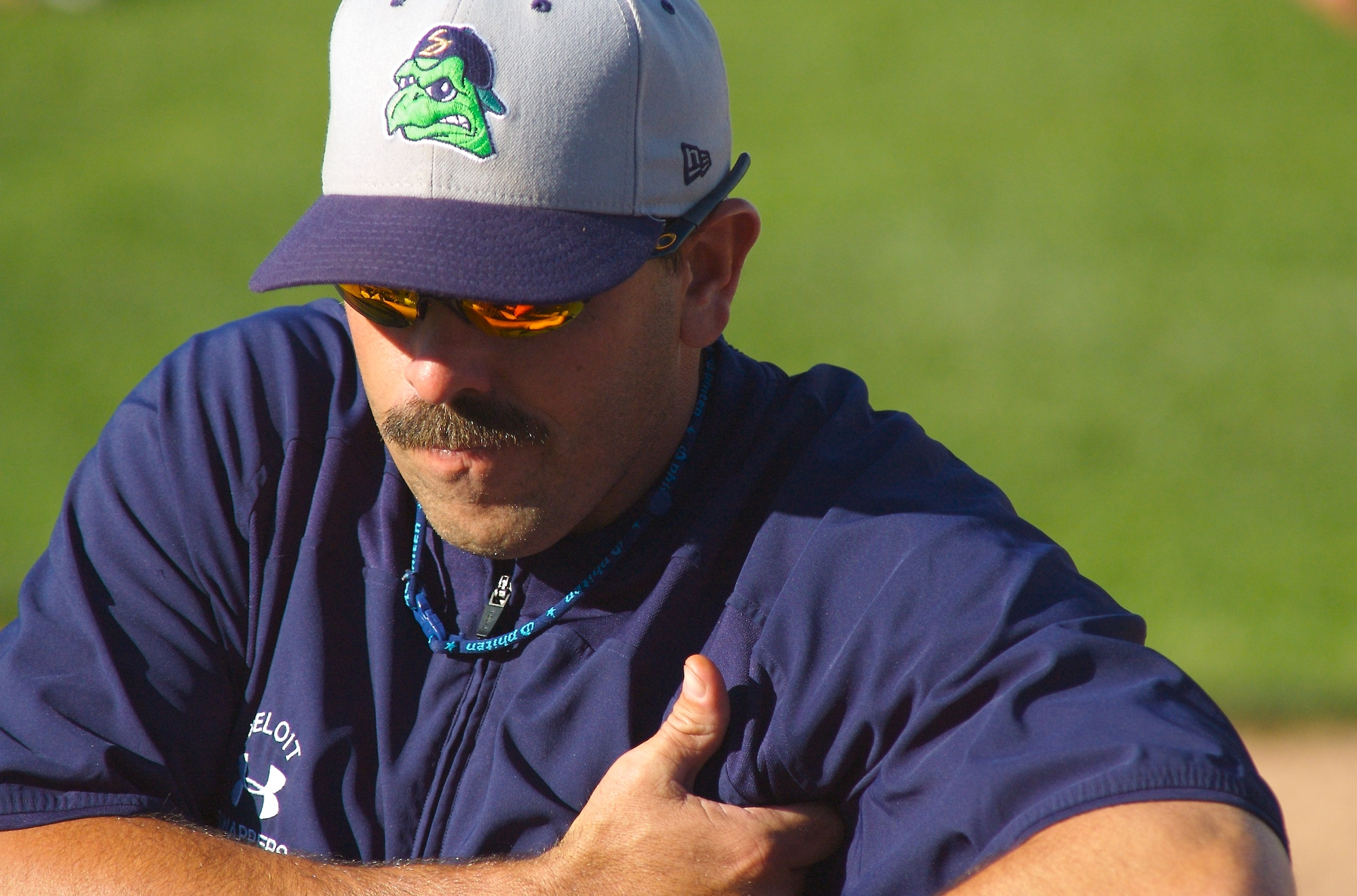
- Mintz with the Beloit Snappers in 2007
- Manager
- Born: November 24, 1968 (age 57); Wilmington, North Carolina, U.S.
- Batted: Left Threw: Right

MLB debut
- May 18, 1995, for the San Francisco Giants

Last MLB appearance
- October 2, 1999, for the Anaheim Angels

MLB statistics
- Win–loss record: 1–2
- Earned run average: 6.66
- Strikeouts: 9
- Stats at Baseball Reference

Teams
- San Francisco Giants (1995); Anaheim Angels (1999)

Stephen Wayne Mintz (born November 24, 1968) is an American former professional baseball pitcher and manager. Mintz played parts of two seasons in Major League Baseball (MLB) for the San Francisco Giants and the Anaheim Angels.

== Career ==
=== Playing career ===
Mintz was drafted by the Los Angeles Dodgers in the 17th round of the 1990 amateur draft out of Mount Olive College in Mount Olive, North Carolina. He played his first professional season with the Dodgers' Class A (short season) Yakima Bears in 1990, then played two more seasons in their organization and was released before the 1993 season.

He was picked up by the Boston Red Sox, playing one season in their farm system, then signed with the San Francisco Giants on December 15, 1993, making his major league debut for the Giants on May 18, 1995. In 14 appearances with San Francisco that season, he was 1-2 with a 7.45 earned run average.

After four seasons in the Milwaukee Brewers, San Diego Padres and Pittsburgh Pirates organizations, he made three appearances with the Anaheim Angels during the 1999 season. He ended his career with Anaheim's Triple-A farm club, the Salt Lake Stingers, in 2001.

=== Coaching career ===
Retiring as an active player midway through the 2001 season, he spent the second half of the season as pitching coach for the Angels' short-season minor league teams. He then moved to the Twins' organization, and coached for the Gulf Coast League Twins from 2002 through 2005. He was then promoted to pitching coach for the Midwest League Beloit Snappers. After two seasons there, he went on to coach for the Double-A New Britain Rock Cats. In 2009, he replaced Eric Rasmussen as pitching coach of the Twins' Florida State League advanced A affiliate, the Fort Myers Miracle, a position he continued to hold as of the end of the 2011 season.

Mintz moved to the Texas Rangers organization beginning in 2013, serving as pitching coach for the Myrtle Beach Pelicans. After two seasons, he was promoted to pitching coach for the High Desert Mavericks for the 2015 season. In 2016, Mintz was again promoted to manage the Class A Hickory Crawdads of the South Atlantic League. However, he was not brought for a second season, and returned as a pitching coach for the Class A-Advanced Down East Wood Ducks in 2017. He served in that role for the 2017, 2018 and, 2019 seasons, and was slated to do the same for the 2020 season before it was canceled due to the COVID-19 pandemic. In 2022, Mintz was promoted to manager of the Wood Ducks.

During the 2015-16 season, Mintz was the manager of the Australian Baseball League's Adelaide Bite, leading them to a 30-26 record and a spot in the league's Championship Series.

Mintz served as manager of the Auckland Tuatara for their 2018-19 inaugural season in the Australian Baseball League, and returned for the 2019-2020 season.
