= Auckland Tuatara =

Auckland Tuatara may refer to:

- Auckland Tuatara (baseball)
- Auckland Tuatara (basketball)
