= Ryan Bollinger =

American baseball player (born 1991)

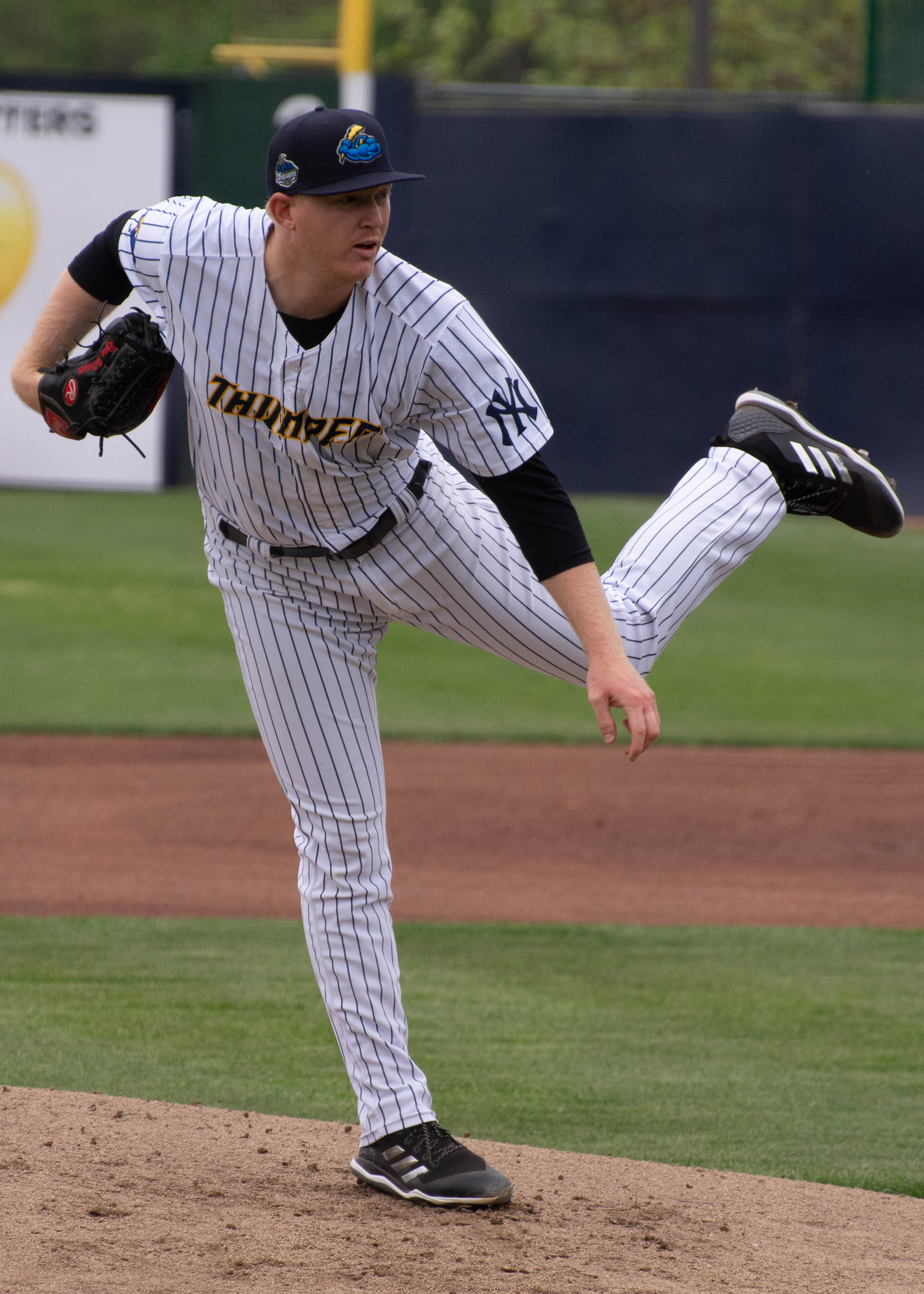
- Bollinger pitching for the Trenton Thunder in 2018

Gauting Indians – No. 28
- Pitcher
- Born: February 4, 1991 (age 35); Apple Valley, California
- Bats: Left Throws: Left

CPBL debut
- June 8, 2019, for the Fubon Guardians

CPBL statistics (through 2022 season)
- Win–loss record: 19–18
- Earned run average: 3.73
- Strikeouts: 355
- Stats at Baseball Reference

Teams
- Fubon Guardians (2019); Rakuten Monkeys (2021–2022)

Ryan Michael Bollinger (born February 4, 1991) is an American professional baseball pitcher for the Gauting Indians of the Deutsche Baseball Liga. He has previously played in the Chinese Professional Baseball League (CPBL) for the Fubon Guardians and Rakuten Monkeys. In 2018, he was promoted to the major leagues by the New York Yankees, but he did not appear in a game, making him a phantom ballplayer.

== Career ==
Born in Apple Valley, California, Bollinger attended Minot High School in Minot, North Dakota, where he played for the baseball team. He committed to attend Iowa Western Community College to play college baseball.

=== Philadelphia Phillies ===
The Philadelphia Phillies selected Bollinger in the 47th round, with the 1,247th overall selection, of the 2009 MLB draft as a first baseman, and he signed rather than enroll in college. Bollinger was released on June 15, 2010, having appeared in only seven games in the Phillies system.

=== Windy City ThunderBolts ===
In July 2010, Bollinger signed with the Windy City ThunderBolts of the Frontier League, an independent baseball league, in 2010 as a pitcher. He did not allow a run in 6.0 innings pitched for the club.

=== Chicago White Sox ===
On October 7, 2010, the Chicago White Sox purchased his contract. In 2011, Bollinger spent the year with the rookie ball Bristol White Sox, registering a 5-2 record and 4.23 ERA in 12 appearances. In 2012, Bollinger again spent the year in rookie ball, this time for the Great Falls Voyagers, and pitched to a 4-3 record and 3.56 ERA in 17 games for the club. In 2013, Bollinger played for the Single-A Kannapolis Intimidators, recording a 3.17 ERA with 52 strikeouts in 29 games. On March 25, 2014, Bollinger was released by the White Sox organization.

=== St. Paul Saints ===
Bollinger signed with the St. Paul Saints of the American Association of Independent Professional Baseball for the 2014 season. In 7 games out of the bullpen for the club, he registered a 13.50 ERA and 3 strikeouts.

=== Trois-Rivières Aigles ===
Bollinger then signed with the Trois-Rivières Aigles of the Canadian American Association of Professional Baseball, and went 4-7 with a 4.73 ERA in 13 games for the team.

=== Winnipeg Goldeyes ===
On August 15, 2014, Bollinger was traded to the Winnipeg Goldeyes of the American Association of Independent Professional Baseball. He made 4 appearances for Winnipeg, pitching to a 3-0 record with 11 strikeouts.

=== Trois-Rivières Aigles (second stint) ===
On September 23, 2014, Bollinger was traded back to the Trois-Rivières Aigles. In 2015 for the club, Bollinger pitched to a 11-7 record and 3.68 ERA with 108 strikeouts in 20 appearances. In 2016 for the Aigles, Bollinger recorded a 2-11 record and 4.87 ERA in 22 appearances.

=== Haar Disciples ===
On February 1, 2017, Bollinger signed with the Haar Disciples, and played in the Bundesliga in Germany. After the season, he was named the best pitcher of the Southern League. Bollinger pitched to a 10-1 record and 0.76 ERA, and allowed only 12 walks in 106.0 innings pitched. He also broke the Bundesliga single-season strikeout record, with his 178 strikeouts on the year being 14 more than the previous record.

He also pitched for the Brisbane Bandits of the Australian Baseball League during the 2017–18 season. He returned to the Bandits for the 2018–19 season.

=== New York Yankees ===
On December 16, 2017, Bollinger signed a minor league contract with the New York Yankees organization. He began the 2018 season with the Scranton/Wilkes-Barre RailRiders of the Triple–A International League, where he pitched in two games, and then pitched for the Trenton Thunder of the Double–A Eastern League. The Yankees promoted Bollinger to the major leagues on May 23, and optioned him back to Trenton the next day, without Bollinger making his major league debut. He was outrighted to Trenton on May 27, removing him from the Yankees' 40-man roster. He was then added to the 25-man roster on July 31. He optioned to Trenton on August 1, and designated for assignment on September 1. He returned to Scranton/Wilkes-Barre. Bollinger declared free agency on October 8, 2018.

=== San Diego Padres ===
On November 26, 2018, Bollinger signed a minor-league contract with the San Diego Padres that included an invitation to spring training. He was released by the Padres on March 27, 2019.

=== Fubon Guardians ===
On June 5, 2019, Bollinger signed with the Fubon Guardians of the Chinese Professional Baseball League. Bollinger registered a 4.31 ERA with 127 strikeouts in 108.2 innings, including a 10-strikeout shutout game on June 16, 2019. He re-signed with the team for the 2020 season. He did not play in a game in 2020 due to a nagging foot injury and was released on August 6, 2020.

=== Rakuten Monkeys ===
On December 15, 2020, Bollinger signed with the Rakuten Monkeys of the Chinese Professional Baseball League for the 2021 season. In 19 starts for the club, he posted a 5–7 record and 2.80 ERA with 114 strikeouts across 106.0 innings pitched.

On December 28, 2021, Bollinger re–signed with Rakuten. He made 23 starts for the Monkeys, logging an 8–6 record and 4.01 ERA with 114 strikeouts across 130 1/3 innings of work. He became a free agent following the 2022 season.

=== Haar Disciples (second stint) ===
On February 10, 2024, Bollinger signed with the Haar Disciples of the German Baseball Bundesliga.

=== Gauting Indians ===
On December 17, 2024, Bollinger signed with the Gauting Indians of the Deutsche Baseball Liga.

== See also ==
- Phantom ballplayer
