= Logan Wade =

Australian baseball player (born 1991)

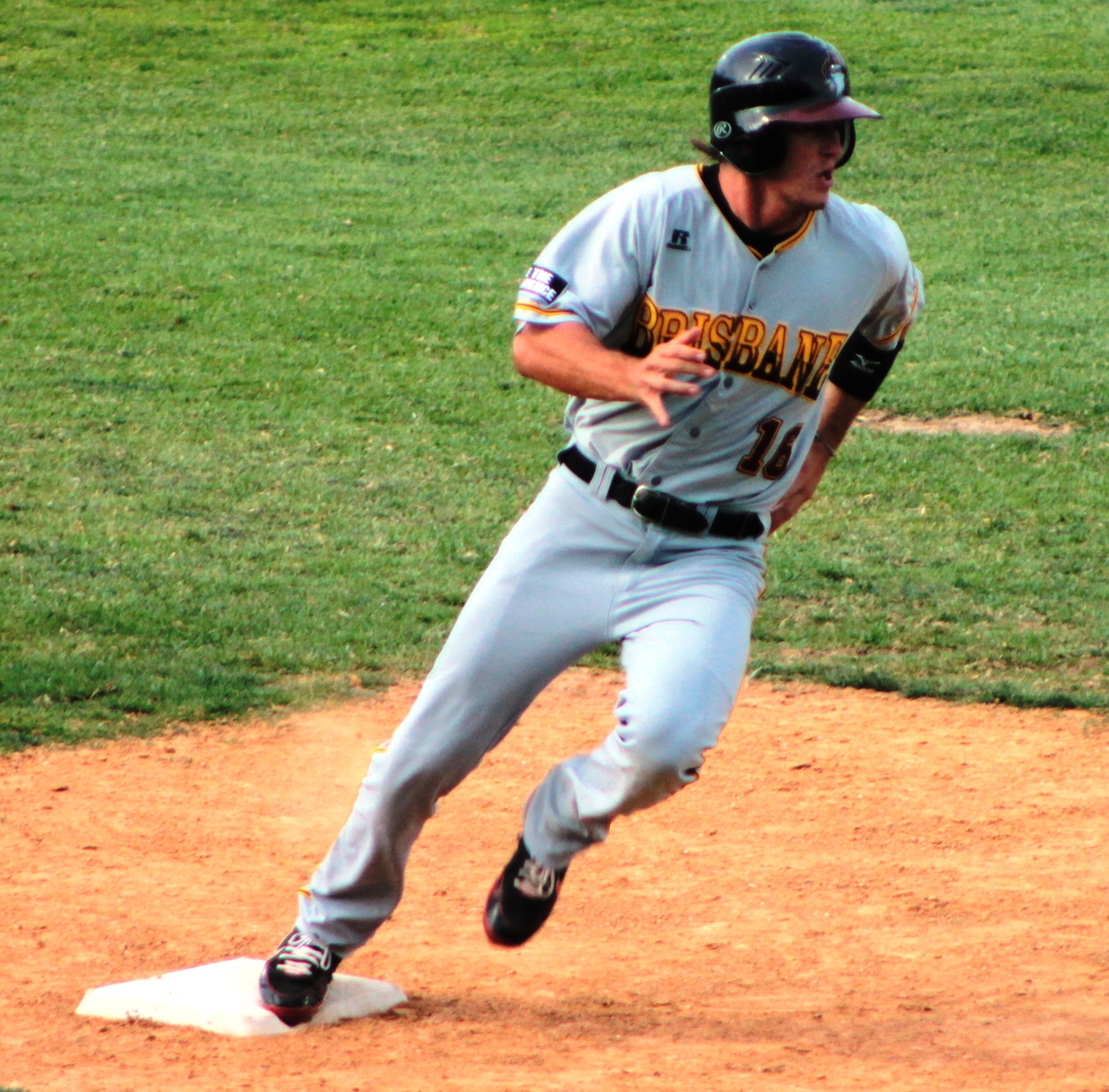
- Wade with the Bandits in 2013

Brisbane Bandits – No. 16
- Infielder
- Born: 13 November 1991 (age 35); Brisbane, Australia
- Bats: Switch Throws: Right
- Stats at Baseball Reference
Medals
Men's baseball
Representing Australia
Haarlem Baseball Week
Bronze medal – third place	2016 Haarlem	National team

Logan Gregory Wade (born 13 November 1991) is an Australian professional baseball player who plays for the Brisbane Bandits.

== Career ==
In 2016 and 2017, Wade was a member of back-to-back Brisbane Bandits championship teams, and was awarded MVP for the 2017 Australian Baseball League Championship Series win over the Melbourne Aces.

== International career ==
He was a member of the Australia national baseball team in the Australian Challenge, 2014 21U Baseball World Cup, 2017 World Baseball Classic Qualification in 2016, 2016 Haarlem Baseball Week, 2017 World Baseball Classic, 2018 exhibition games against Japan and 2019 WBSC Premier12.
