= Melbourne Aces =

Australian professional baseball team

- Logo

Information
- Location: Melbourne, Victoria
- Ballpark: Melbourne Ballpark
- Founded: 2009
- Post-season championships: 2 (2019–20, 2020–21)
- Division championships: 2 (2016–17, 2020–21)
- Colours: Red; Midnight blue; White
- Ownership: Brett Ralph and Shaun Ralph
- General manager: Justin Huber
- Manager: Jon Deeble

The Melbourne Aces are a professional baseball team based in Melbourne, Victoria, Australia that previously competed in the Australian Baseball League. Their home field is the Melbourne Ballpark in Altona.

== History ==
On 20 August 2010 it was announced that ex-Australian Baseball player Philip Dale would take up the head coaching role at Melbourne Aces.

On 12 October 2010, it was announced by newly appointed General Manager Windsor Knox that the Aces would play home games at a redeveloped Melbourne Showgrounds.

In their inaugural season the Melbourne Aces qualified for the finals before being defeated in the semi-finals series against the Adelaide Bite.

On 24 March 2011 the team announced Jet Couriers as their naming rights sponsor for the 2011–12 season.

On 13 July 2012, after many rumours and internet hype, the Melbourne Aces finally announced that they will move from their home field at the Showgrounds to the Melbourne Ballpark in Altona. The move has annoyed and ostracized many Aces supporters from the South Eastern suburbs, but it was the only viable option for them to continue playing in the ABL. The Showgrounds was deemed to be an unsuitable field to play on in the 3rd season. The main reasons being the Aces would not be the sole occupants of the field, having to compete with carnivals, horse shows, music festivals etc. The Showgrounds were also alleged to be booked out until late December, meaning the Aces would have to find a different home venue for the first half of the season.

The Aces won their first ABL championship in 2020 when they defeated the Adelaide Giants in the 2020 ABL Championship Series 2 games to 0, bringing the Claxton Shield to Victoria for the first time since 2010, the 24th time a team from Victoria has won the shield.

=== Withdrawal from the ABL ===
On 28 April 2025, after what the club described as "years of discussions with the ABL regarding unresolved concerns," the Melbourne Aces announced their decision to withdraw from the ABL ahead of the 2025–26 season. They also announced plans to compete in the Korea Baseball Organization's Ulsan-KBO Fall League beginning in October 2025, while hosting several games against KBO clubs at Melbourne Ballpark in January and February 2026.

The Aces opened the 2025–26 campaign in October with a strong showing in the KBO Fall League, posting a 9–2 record in league play before falling 1–0 in the semifinals to the Lotte Giants. Following their stint in Korea, the club hosted six three-game series against the Black Sox Road Warriors, Killer B’s, New Zealand Diamondblacks, Downunder Travellers, the Hanwha Eagles, and the KT Wiz, finishing with an overall record of 22–7–1 while winning five of the six series. Off the field, the team saw notable developments. On 24 December 2025, shortstop Jarryd Dale signed a six-figure contract with the Kia Tigers of the KBO League. Less than a month later, on 11 January 2026, former MLB pitcher Danny Duffy made his debut for the Aces. Following the conclusion of the season, Dale, Ulrich Bojarski, Chris Burke, and Aaron Whitefield represented Australia in the 2026 World Baseball Classic.

== Season‑by‑season ==
Melbourne Aces
Season	League	Overall	Win %	Finish (Note: Melbourne competed in the Southwest Division during the 2018–19, 2019–20, and 2022–23 seasons.)	Manager	Playoffs
2010–11	ABL	18–21	.462	4th	Philip Dale	Lost semifinal series (ADE) 2–0
2011–12	ABL	21–24	.467	2nd	Philip Dale	Lost major semifinal series (PER) 3–1; Won preliminary final series (SYD) 3–2; Lost championship series (PER) 2–1
2012–13	ABL	15–31	.326	6th	Philip Dale	Did not qualify
2013–14	ABL	22–24	.478	4th	Philip Dale	Did not qualify
2014–15	ABL	15–31	.326	6th	Tommy Thompson	Did not qualify
2015–16	ABL	20–35	.364	6th	Joe Vavra	Did not qualify
2016–17	ABL	26–14	.650	1st	Jon Deeble	Lost championship series (BRI) 2–0
2017–18	ABL	17–23	.425	4th	Jon Deeble	Lost semifinal (BRI) 1–0
2018–19	ABL	23–17	.575	2nd (Southwest)	Jon Deeble	Lost wild card (CAN) 1–0
2019–20	ABL	23–17	.575	2nd (Southwest)	Jon Deeble	Won semifinals series (AUC) 2–0; Won championship series (ADE) 2–0
2020–21	ABL	19–9	.679	1st	Allan de San Miguel	Won semifinals (CAN) 1–0; Won championship (PER) 1–0
2021–22	ABL	Season cancelled (COVID-19 pandemic)				
2022–23	ABL	15–21	.417	3rd (Southwest)	Peter Moylan	Did not qualify
2023–24	ABL	21–19	.525	4th	Jon Deeble	Lost semifinal series (ADE) 2–1
2024–25	ABL	18–22	.450	5th	Jon Deeble	Did not qualify
2025–26	KBO Fall	9–2	.818	1st (Group A)	Jon Deeble	Lost semifinal (LOT) 1–0
2025–26	Independent	13–4–1	.750	—	Jon Deeble	None
2026–27	KBO Fall	1–4–3	.313	11th	Jon Deeble	Did not qualify
2026–27	Independent	0–0	–	—	Jon Deeble	
ABL totals		273–308	.470	—	—	12–15 (.444) 2 championships

== Current roster ==
Melbourne Aces roster – 2025-26
Active roster		Coaching staff
Pitchers Right-handed pitchers: -- (New Zealand) Kyle Glogoski; Left-handed pitchers: 29 (United States) Gunnar Kines; 34 (Canada) Evan Rutckyj; 18 (Australia) Lewis Thorpe	Catchers Infielders: 20 (Australia) Jarrod Belbin; 43 (Australia) Jarryd Dale; 41 (Australia) Darryl George; 17 (United States) Morgan McCullough; Outfielders: -- (Australia) Ulrich Bojarski; 13 (Australia) Chris Burke; 2 (Australia) Aaron Whitefield	Manager: -- (Australia) Jon Deeble; Coaches : 7-day disabled list
26 September 2025.

== Melbourne Aces MLB Players ==
This is a list of Melbourne Aces players who have played in Major League Baseball (MLB), including their nationality, through the 2025–26 season.

- (Venezuela) Ronald Acuña Jr.
- (United States) Greg Bird
- (Australia) Travis Blackley
- (Australia) James Beresford
- (United States) Dylan Cozens
- (United States) Darin Downs
- (United States) Danny Duffy
- (United States) Adam Engel
- (United States) Brian Flynn
- (United States) Jeremy Guthrie
- (United States) Mark Hamburger
- (Australia) Brad Harman
- (United States) Jason Hirsh
- (Australia) Luke Hughes
- (Australia) Justin Huber
- (South Korea) Byung-hyun Kim
- (United States) Ryan Lavarnway
- (Australia) Shane Lindsay
- (United States) Matt Marksberry
- (Australia) Peter Moylan
- (South Africa) Gift Ngoepe
- (Canada) Jacob Robson
- (United States) Shane Robinson
- (Australia) Lewis Thorpe
- (United States) Virgil Vasquez
- (Australia) Aaron Whitefield
- (United States) Delmon Young
- (United States) Randy Wynne

== See also ==
- Melbourne Aces award winners and league leaders
