= Josh Guyer =

American baseball player (born 1994)

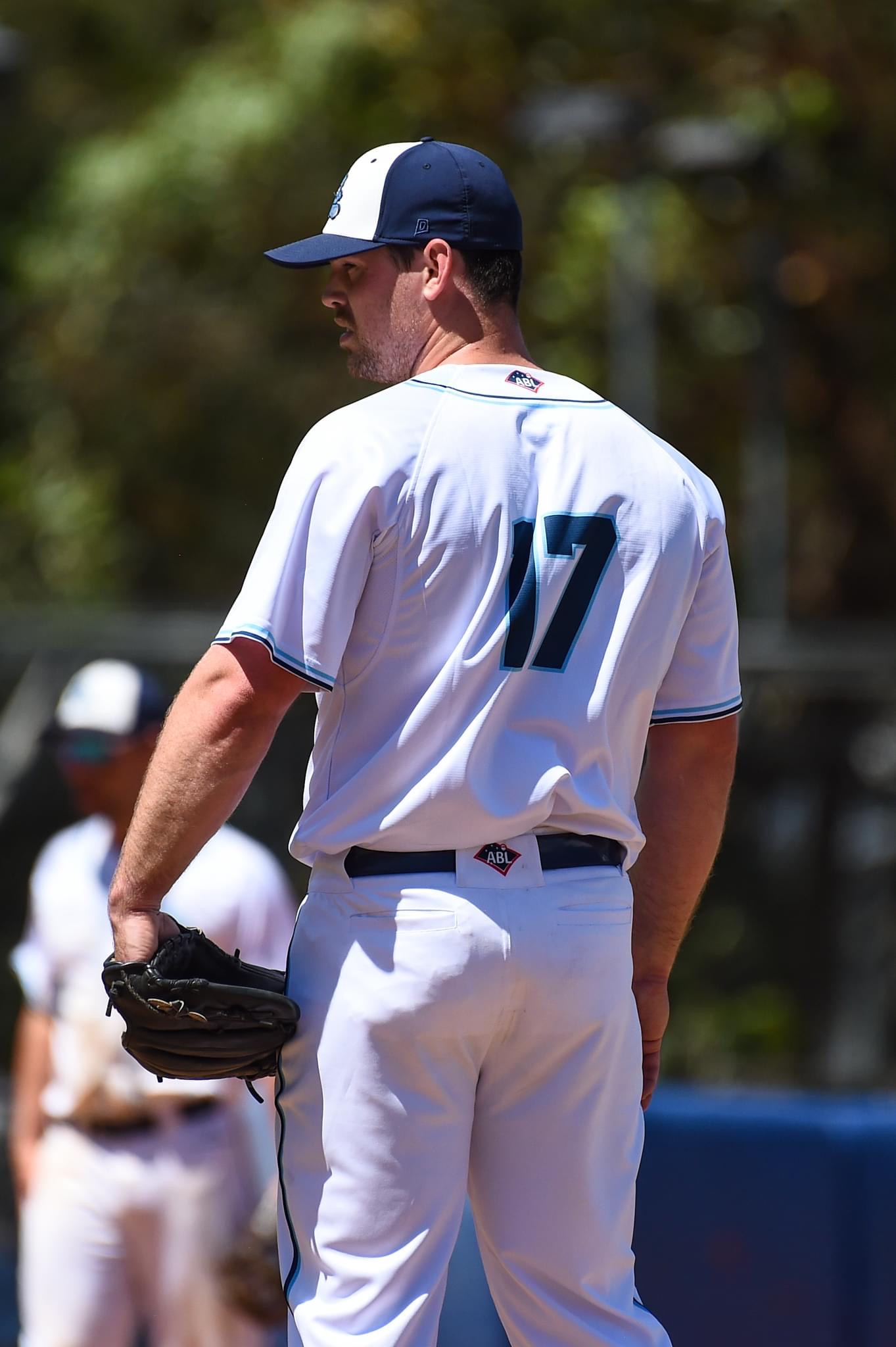
- Guyer with the Sydney Blue Sox in 2022

Sydney Blue Sox – No. 17
- Pitcher
- Born: 27 May 1994 (age 32); Tamworth, New South Wales
- Bats: Right Throws: Right
- Stats at Baseball Reference
Medals
Men's baseball
Representing Australia
U-23 Baseball World Cup
Silver medal – second place	2016 Monterrey	Team

Joshua Alexander Guyer (born 27 May 1994) is an Australian professional baseball pitcher for the Sydney Blue Sox of the Australian Baseball League.

== Career ==
Guyer was signed as a non-drafted free agent by the Minnesota Twins organization on 26 July 2012. He made his affiliated debut in 2013 with the rookie-level Gulf Coast League Twins; he returned to the club in 2014, logging a 1-1 record and 5.01 ERA with 26 strikeouts in 46 2/3 innings pitched across 12 games (eight starts).

In 2015, Guyer made 13 appearances for the rookie-level Elizabethton Twins, for whom he recorded a 7.98 ERA with 16 strikeouts across 14 2/3 innings pitched. The 2015 remains Guyer's last season in affiliated baseball.

Guyer was selected as a member of the Australia national baseball team for the 2017 World Baseball Classic, 2019 Canberra camp, 2019 WBSC Premier12 and the 2023 World Baseball Classic.
