= Tim Atherton =

Australian baseball player

Brisbane Bandits – No. 27
- Pitcher
- Born: 7 November 1989 (age 37); Kempsey, New South Wales, Australia
- Bats: Right Throws: Right
- Stats at Baseball Reference
Medals
Men's baseball
Representing Australia
Haarlem Baseball Week
| Bronze medal – third place | 2016 Haarlem | National team |

Timothy Ian Atherton (born 7 November 1989) is an Australian professional baseball player for the Brisbane Bandits of the Australian Baseball League.

== Career ==
Atherton has played four seasons with the Canberra Cavalry, one season for the Sydney Blue Sox and the two most recent seasons with the Brisbane Bandits.

He was a part of the Bandits 2017-18 and 2018-19 championships, becoming the first player to be named twice ABLCS MVP.

== International career ==
He was a member of the Australia national baseball team in the Australia Series, Australian Challenge, 2016 Haarlem Baseball Week, 2017 World Baseball Classic, 2018 exhibition series against Japan, and 2019 WBSC Premier12.
