= 2019–20 Australian Baseball League season =

- League: Australian Baseball League
- Sport: Baseball
- Duration: 21 November 2019 – 9 February 2020
- Games: 155
- Teams: 8

Regular season
- Season MVP: Timothy Kennelly; Marcus Solbach

Championship Series
- Champions: Melbourne Aces (1st title)
- Runners-up: Adelaide Giants

Seasons
- ← 2018–19 2020–21 →

The 2019–20 Australian Baseball League season was the tenth year Australian Baseball League (ABL) season. The season was held from 21 November 2019 to 9 February 2020. The Melbourne Aces won their first title after defeating the Adelaide Giants in the postseason.

== Teams ==
On 27 August 2019, the Adelaide franchise announced it changed its name from the Adelaide Bite to the Adelaide Giants. This was the name of the Adelaide franchise from 1989–1999 and is the first renaming of a team in the league's history. The Tuatara also moved their team from the baseball-specific venue of McLeod Park to North Harbour Stadium, which was converted to a baseball field for the first time.

Teams in the ABL
Team	State / Territory/ Country	Stadium
Adelaide Giants	South Australia	Diamond Sports Stadium
Auckland Tuatara	New Zealand	North Harbour Stadium
Brisbane Bandits	Queensland	Holloway Field
Canberra Cavalry	Australian Capital Territory	Narrabundah Ballpark
Geelong-Korea	Victoria	Geelong Baseball Park
Melbourne Aces	Victoria	Melbourne Ballpark
Perth Heat	Western Australia	Baseball Park
Sydney Blue Sox	New South Wales	Blue Sox Stadium

== Regular season ==
The league retains a 10-round, 40 game schedule, with teams playing division rivals eight times and inter division teams four times. Auckland, Brisbane, Canberra and Sydney grouped into the 'Northeast Division' with Adelaide, Geelong, Melbourne and Perth grouped into the 'Southwest Division'.

Scheduled doubleheaders consist of a seven inning game followed by a nine inning game. The league uses the WBSC tiebreaker rule for all games going beyond the 9th inning, or extra innings beginning less than one hour to a curfew. In November, 2019 it was announced all games played at North Harbour Stadium would be reduced to seven innings to suit a local broadcast deal with Sky Sport.

In round six, one of the games between the Bandits and Cavalry in Canberra was suspended due to poor air quality conditions following the severity of the 2019–20 Australian bushfire season, with the game completed the next day. The following round seven matchup between the Giants and Cavalry in Canberra was cancelled due to the same poor air quality, reducing their schedule to 36 games. The conditions were the main contributing factor to Cavalry player Gavin Cecchini returning home before the completion of the season.

Each team's series roster consists of 22 eligible players in addition to four amateur underage development players.

Key
Secured Semi-finals berth
Secured Wild Card berth

Northeast Division
Pos	Team	W	L	Pct.	GB	Home	Away
1	Auckland Tuatara	21.5	18.5	.538	-	12–4	7½–12½
2	Canberra Cavalry	20	20	.500	1.5	12½-7½	6½–9½
3	Brisbane Bandits	19	21	.475	2.5	12–8	5–11
4	Sydney Blue Sox	16.5	23.5	.413	5.0	7–9	7½–12½

Southwest Division
Pos	Team	W	L	Pct.	GB	Home	Away
1	Adelaide Giants	26	14	.650	-	13–3	9-11
2*	Melbourne Aces	23	17	.575	1.0	13–7	8–8
3	Perth Heat	23	17	.575	1.0	9–7	12–8
4	Geelong-Korea	11	29	.275	11.0	8–12	3–13

- holds tiebreaker

=== Statistical leaders ===
Batting leaders
Stat	Player (Note: Minimum 2.7 PAs per team game.)	Team	Total
AVG	Colin Willis	Melbourne Aces	.427
HR	Delmon Young	Melbourne Aces	13
RBI	Delmon Young	Melbourne Aces	42
R	Tim Kennelly Colin Willis	Perth Heat Melbourne Aces	32
H	Robbie Glendinning	Perth Heat	52
SB	Aaron Whitefield	Adelaide Giants	23

Pitching leaders
Stat	Player (Note: Minimum 0.8 IP per team game.)	Team	Total
W	Dylan Unsworth	Perth Heat	6
L	Jong-Mu Park	Geelong Korea	10
ERA	Gunnar Kines	Adelaide Giants	1.50
K	Dylan Unsworth	Perth Heat	75
IP	Dylan Unsworth	Perth Heat	71
SV	Ryan Searle Ryan Chaffee	Brisbane Bandits Adelaide Giants	6

=== Awards ===
Season awards
Award	Player	Team	Ref
Helms Award (MVP)	Aaron Whitefield	Adelaide Giants	
Postseason MVP	Shane Robinson	Melbourne Aces	
Pitching Champion	Dylan Unsworth	Perth Heat	
Hitting Champion	Delmon Young	Melbourne Aces	
Reliever of the Year	Ryan Chaffee	Adelaide Giants	
Defensive Player of the Year	Aaron Whitefield	Adelaide Giants	
Rookie of the Year	Elliot Johnstone	Auckland Tuatara	

== Postseason ==
The postseason continued to include the top five teams, with a single wild card game between the fourth and fifth seeds prior to two rounds of best-of-three finals series.

The top seed was awarded to the team with the best regular season record, with the other division winner awarded the second seed. The third and fourth seed were awarded to the two divisional runner ups with the fifth seed being given to the team with the next best season record.

The only change to the playoff structure from the previous season was the higher semi final was given home field advantage in games two and three (if required), with game one hosted by the lower seed.

Shane Robinson was named Championship Series MVP after batting 5/10 with three RBI and one home-run. He batted .412/.500/.647 across the postseason.

Wild Card
4	Canberra Cavalry	5
5	Perth Heat	4

Semi-finals series
1	Adelaide Giants	6	5	6
4	Canberra Cavalry	7	2	3
2	Auckland Tuatara	4	2	X
3	Melbourne Aces	5	6	X

Championship Series
1	Adelaide Giants	3	2	X
3	Melbourne Aces	4	6	X

=== Championship Series ===
07 February 2020; 19:00 (UTC+11:00); Game 1	Melbourne Aces	4-3	Adelaide Giants	(Victoria (state)) Melbourne Ballpark, Melbourne; Attendance: 2,367; Umpires: HP: Trent Thomas. 1B: Tom West. 2B: Brett Robson. 3B: Paul Latta.
07 February 2020; 19:00 (UTC+11:00); Game 1	WP: Jon Kennedy (1-0)	Boxscore	LP: Ryan Chaffee (0-1)	(Victoria (state)) Melbourne Ballpark, Melbourne; Attendance: 2,367; Umpires: HP: Trent Thomas. 1B: Tom West. 2B: Brett Robson. 3B: Paul Latta.

08 February 2020; 19:00 (UTC+10:30); Game 2	Adelaide Giants	2-6	Melbourne Aces	(South Australia) Bennett Field, Adelaide; Attendance: 1,905; Umpires: HP: Tom West. 1B: Brett Robson. 2B: Paul Latta. 3B: Trent Thomas.
08 February 2020; 19:00 (UTC+10:30); Game 2	LP: David Holmberg (0-1)	Boxscore	WP: Wes Helsabeck (1-0)	(South Australia) Bennett Field, Adelaide; Attendance: 1,905; Umpires: HP: Tom West. 1B: Brett Robson. 2B: Paul Latta. 3B: Trent Thomas.
08 February 2020; 19:00 (UTC+10:30); Game 2	HR: Mikey Reynolds (1), Jeremy Hazelbaker (1)	Boxscore	HR: Shane Robinson (1), Delmon Young (1)	(South Australia) Bennett Field, Adelaide; Attendance: 1,905; Umpires: HP: Tom West. 1B: Brett Robson. 2B: Paul Latta. 3B: Trent Thomas.
