= Colin Willis =

New Zealand Paralympian

Colin Willis MNZM
Sport
- Country: New Zealand
- Sport: Shooting
Medal record
Men's shooting para sport
Representing New Zealand
World Championships
| Silver medal – second place | Seoul 2002 | Men's Mixed air rifle standing SH2 |

Colin Willis MNZM is a New Zealand sport shooter who competed at five Paralympic games – 1984, 1992, 1996, 2000 and 2004. He was also a silver medallist at the 2002 IPC Shooting World Championships.

In the 2006 New Year Honours, Willis was appointed a Member of the New Zealand Order of Merit, for services to sport.
