= Geelong-Korea =

Australian professional baseball team

- Logo

Information
- League: Australian Baseball League
- Location: Geelong, Victoria
- Ballpark: Geelong Baseball Park
- Founded: 2018
- Folded: 2023
- Colours: Indigo; Black
- Ownership: ABL
- General manager: Chung-Sik Park
- Manager: Byung-kyu Lee

The Geelong-Korea were a professional baseball team in the Australian Baseball League. One of two expansion teams added to the ABL for the 2018–19 season, the team was based in the city of Geelong, Victoria and played its home games at Geelong Baseball Park. All professional members of the team were Korean.

Geelong-Korea played in only three of their five seasons in the league, having sat out the 2020–21 and 2021–22 Australian Baseball League seasons due to the COVID-19 pandemic. The team folded following the 2022–2023 season.

== Regular season record-by-year ==
Season	Finish	Wins	Losses	Win%	GB
2018–2019	4th (Southwest Division)	7	33	.175	17.0
2019–2020	4th (Southwest Division)	12	28	.300	11.0
2020–2021	Did not participate				
2021–2022	Did not participate				
2022–2023	4th (Southwest Division)	13	27	.325	12.0
Totals		32	88	.267	

== See also ==
- Sport in Australia
- Australian Baseball
- Australian Baseball League (1989–99)
