= T. J. Bennett =

American baseball player

- Third baseman
- Born: July 22, 1992 (age 34); Letherbridge, Canada
- Bats: Left Throws: Right

Tyler James Bennett (born July 22, 1992) is a Canadian-born, American former professional baseball player.

Bennett played college baseball at Oral Roberts University and the University of Utah. Undrafted, he played independent baseball in the Frontier League with the Schaumburg Boomers and the American Association of Professional Baseball with the Joplin Blasters before player winter ball in the Australian Baseball League with the Brisbane Bandits. After signing with the San Francisco Giants prior the 2016 season, he played three seasons before being released and rejoining teams in the American Association.

In his five seasons with the Brisbane Bandits, Bennett first held the single-season home run record following the 2017–18 Australian Baseball League season where he hit 16 in 37 games and then broke the record again in the 2022–23 Australian Baseball League season with 17 home runs in 40 games.
