= Trent D'Antonio =

Australian baseball player (born 1985)

Sydney Blue Sox – No. 11
- Utility
- Born: 14 August 1985 (age 41); Wollongong, Australia
- Bats: left Throws: right
- Stats at Baseball Reference

Trent M. D'Antonio (born 14 August 1985) is an Australian professional baseball utility player for the Sydney Blue Sox of the Australian Baseball League. He has previously played for the Florida Marlins organization.

He is the all-time leader for bases on balls (228), triples (10) and caught stealing (31) in the Australian Baseball League as of 1 January 2023.

He was selected Australia national baseball team at 2017 World Baseball Classic, 2018 exhibition games against Japan, 2019 Canberra camp and 2019 WBSC Premier12.
