= Brisbane Bandits =

Australian professional baseball team

- Logo

Information
- League: Australian Baseball League
- Location: Brisbane, Queensland
- Ballpark: Viticon Stadium
- Founded: 2009 (Note: The Brisbane Bandits inaugural season was 2010–11.)
- Post-season championships: 4 (2015–16, 2016–17, 2017–18, 2018–19)
- Minor premierships: 3 (2015–16, 2017–18, 2022–23)
- Colours: Blue; Gold
- Mascot: Buster
- Ownership: David Stewart, Mark Ready, Kevin Cuyler
- General manager: Stuart Masters
- Manager: (Australia) (United States) Jim Bennett

Current uniforms
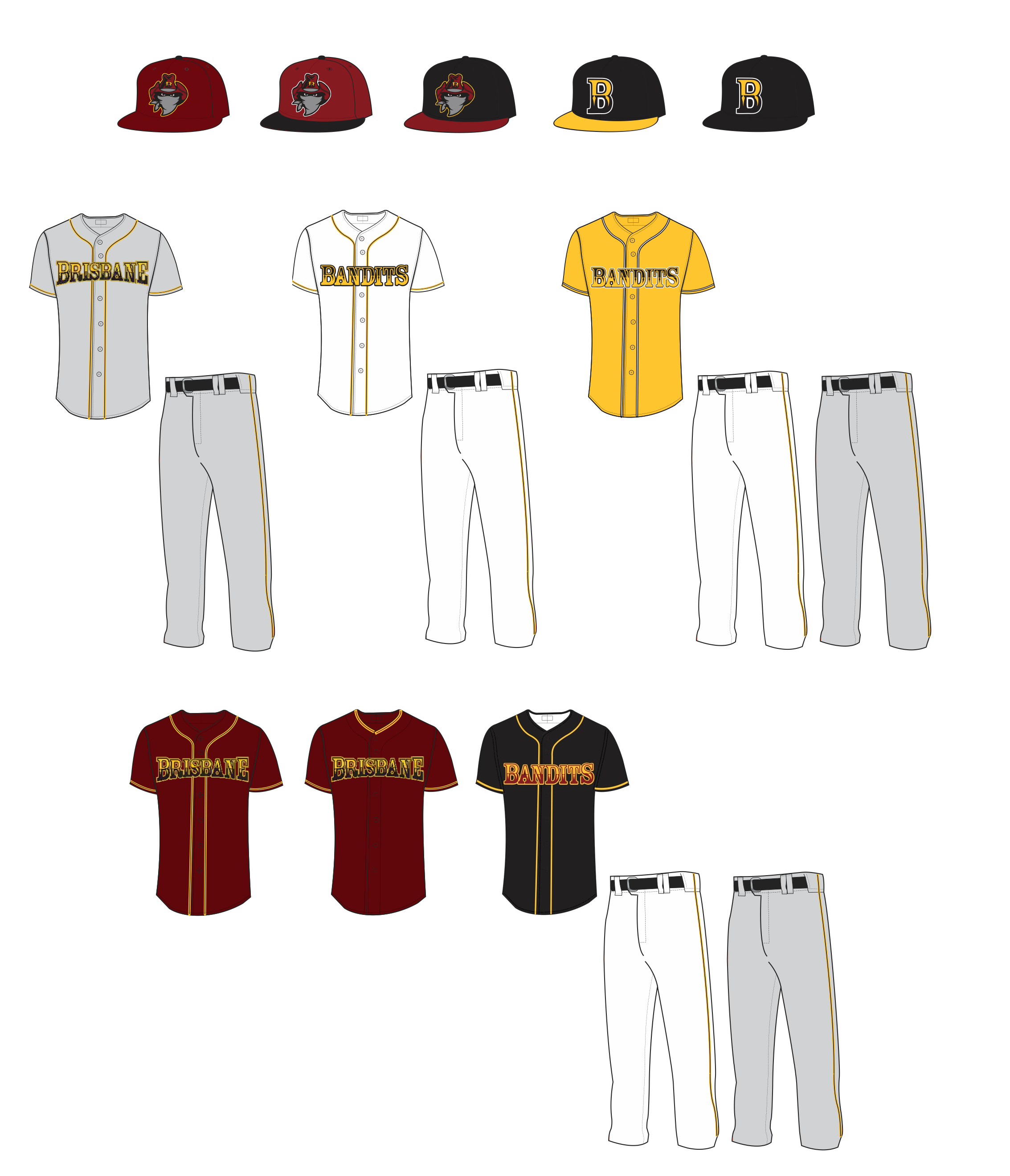

The Brisbane Bandits are a professional baseball team in Brisbane, Queensland that plays in the Australian Baseball League and is one of the six founding teams of the league. From the 2010/11 season till the 2012/13 season their home ballpark was the Brisbane Exhibition Ground, the ground which the old Brisbane Bandits played at for the majority of their nine-year tenure. As of the start of the 2013/14 the Bandits home ground is Holloway Field (officially Viticon Stadium, formerly Onehub Stadium, powered by Optus) in Newmarket.

In the inaugural season, Paul Gonzalez was announced as the GM, replacing Kim Jessop as the previous GM with the Queensland Rams. Former ABL MVP and MLB All-Star Dave Nilsson was named the manager and Gary Nilsson the pitching coach. In 2011, another ABL MVP and ex-MLB player, Kevin Jordan, replaced Nilsson as manager. In 2014, Dave Nilsson returned as manager.

The current GM for the Bandits is Stuart Masters

== History ==
=== 2010–11 season ===
The Brisbane Bandits, Sydney Blue Sox and Perth Heat all started their seasons in Brisbane. The ceremonial first pitch was thrown by Graeme Lloyd and caught by the Bandits' manager Dave Nilsson; the couple of all-Australian battery to appear in a Major League Baseball game and both Baseball Australia Hall of Fame inductees in their own right. Despite Robbie Widlansky's two extra base hits and his scoring two runs, Perth was unable to take the lead at any point in the game. Brisbane's Wade Dutton, Shuhei Fukuda, Miguel Almonte, Frank Snook, Alan Schoenberger, and Joel Naughton each had multi-hit games to help the Bandits to an 8–3 win in their first ever ABL game. Perth however went on to win the series 3–1. Brisbane went on to split the next five series against Sydney, Perth and Adelaide, with Josh Roberts hitting the first home-run for the Bandits in the 9th game of a season. The Brisbane season then took a bad turn travelling to Melbourne for the first time and getting swept in the four-game series. They found the challenge difficult to compete at the battered friend, Melbourne Showgrounds, conceding 56 runs in four games despite hitting 10 home-runs. Brisbane split the home series at the RNA against the Aces before winning their first series of the season, downing Canberra away 3–1. With an entire series washed out by the 2011 Brisbane floods, the season would hinge on the team's results in Adelaide where two wins out of a six-game series would see the team have to play another series against the Cavalry. However, the Adelaide Bite won five out of the six games from the Bandits, finishing the Bandits season 8.5 games out of first and one place out of the playoffs.

Joshua Roberts finished the season tied first with 30 RBI as well as Chris Mowday finishing tied first in wins with 6.

=== 2011–12 season ===
In October 2011, assistant manager Kevin Jordan was named manager.

Brisbane finished the season in a 4-way tie for 3rd, but due to the tie breaking procedure of the ABL, were placed 5th, narrowly missing out on their first postseason. If the Bandits had won one more game in the 2011–12 season, they would have finished 2nd ahead of Melbourne.

=== 2012–13 season ===
The Bandits finished the season with 23 wins and 22 losses. This put them in fourth place by 1.5 games, so they missed the playoffs.

=== 2013–14 season ===
On 14 October 2013, Jay Klein was named general manager and Shea Maple was named assistant general manager. The first game for the Bandits at Holloway Field was held on 1 November 2013 against the Adelaide Bite. The Bite won the first game 6-10, however, the Bandits won the other three games of the opening series over the following two days 3–2, 4–0, and 4–3 to win their first series at the new home ground. The Bandits finished the season in last place with a record of 18 wins and 28 losses.

=== 2014–15 season ===
Dave Nilsson was announced as Brisbane Bandits Head Coach for the 2014–15 season. In his second match in charge, the Bandits suffered a 23-3 mauling by Adelaide, which he said was one of his heaviest losses as a player or coach. The Bandits would recover to split the opening series with Adelaide and leading into January 2015 were a chance to make the playoffs with a 17–15 win–loss record. However, the Bandits would win only four of their next 14 matches to fall to a 21–25 win–loss record and miss the playoffs.

=== 2015–16 season ===
Brisbane retained head coach Dave Nilsson for the 2015–16 season and recruited Pitching and Third Base Coach Jim Bennett and Assistant and First Base Coach Michael Johns. Brisbane Bandits finished the regular season with a record of 37 wins and 19 losses and earned the right to host the Championship series at AFA Stadium at Holloway Field.

In Game 1 of the Championship series against the Adelaide Bite, the Brisbane Bandits prevailed 7–4. In front of 2,242 fans, Bralin Jackson opened the scoring with a homer off Bite starting pitcher Josh Tols in the bottom of the 1st inning. Donald Lutz, Mitch Nilsson and TJ Bennett combined to drive in the four runs at the bottom of the 3rd inning and the Bandits retained the advantage to win Game 1. On a wet Saturday night for Game 2, Brisbane ran out 7-1 winners in front of 2,417 fans to claim the Claxton Shield for the first time. Starting pitcher Travis Blackley struck out Adelaide's Stefan Welch on a full count with runners on second and third base when the game was still scoreless in the third inning. Donald Lutz hit a three-run homer with two outs in the bottom of the 3rd inning to start the Brisbane offense. It all ended with an out from closer Ryan Searle, caught by outfielder Justin Williams, after Searle's 17 saves in the regular season.

=== 2016–17 season ===
Brisbane finished the regular season in third position with a record of 21 wins and 18 losses. The Bandits earned their place in the playoffs by defeating the Canberra Cavalry 3–1 at The Fort at MIT Ballpark (Narrabundah Ballpark) in the last round of the regular season. After an 8–5 win and a 1–4 loss in the first two matches against the Cavalry, Brisbane won the third match 5–4 in extra innings before a crushing 11–2 victory in the final match to claim their spot in the playoffs.

The Bandits faced Adelaide Bite in the best-of-three Preliminary Final series. Brisbane prevailed 3–1 in Game 1 in Adelaide, with Bandits starting pitcher Justin Eramus allowing just one run and one hit over 5.2 complete innings. In Game 2 in Brisbane, the match went to extra innings with Adelaide plating four runs in the 12th inning to take the series to a decider. In Game 3 the Bandits rose to the occasion, securing the win 18–2. Brisbane starting pitcher Rick Teasley threw nine strikeouts and allowed just three hits and one run. The Bandits' offence accounted for 23 hits and seven home runs.

The win against Adelaide took Brisbane to their second straight Championship series, facing the Melbourne Aces in a best-of-three series at Melbourne Ballpark. In Game 1, the Bandits would prevail 6–2 on the back of home runs to Trent Oeltjen, David Rodriguez, Logan Wade and Kevin Padlo. Brisbane claimed the Championship series with a 3–1 win in Game 2. Bandits starting pitcher, Kramer Champlin, pitched 7 innings, allowing just one hit and one run. Ryan Searle pitched the final two innings, throwing four strikeouts, to secure back-to-back Championships for the Brisbane Bandits.

=== 2017–18 season ===
Brisbane finished the regular season in first position with 28 wins and 11 losses. The new four-team playoffs meant the Bandits, instead of automatically hosting the Championship series, would host the fourth placed Melbourne Aces in a best-of-three Semi Final series at Holloway Field. Unrelenting rain caused the first two matches to be cancelled, resulting in a winner takes all decider. With the score tied at 8–8 at the bottom of the 9th inning, David Sutherland homered on a 2-2 pitch from Jon Kennedy over right-center-field to send the Bandits to their third straight Championship series.

Brisbane fell behind in the best-of-three by falling to the Canberra Cavalry at The Fort at MIT Ballpark, 5–1, in Game 1. Cavalry starting pitcher Brian Grening kept the Bandits' bats quiet, allowing five hits and no runs through 6.2 innings. Returning to Brisbane for Game 2, the Bandits rebounded with a fury, pummeling Canberra, 12–2. Donald Lutz and Chih-Shen Lin both scored homers in the opening innings, with Lin homering again in the 7th inning with a two-run shot. David Sutherland and Andrew Campbell both hit homers in the 2nd inning, with Campbell scoring his second solo home run in the 4th inning. Bandits' Tim Atherton pitched seven innings, allowing three hits and throwing 11 strikeouts. In the decisive Game 3 Bandits' catcher Adam Weisenburger hit a two-run, two-out home run off Frank Gailey in the 2nd inning to give Brisbane an early lead. Mitch Nilsson followed up with a two-out solo home run in the 6th inning. Gailey then drilled Andrew Campbell and the benches emptied, with Brisbane Bandits Manager Dave Nilsson and Coach Adrian Lamb ejected when the dust settled. After a tense final three innings with Canberra scoring singles in the top of 7th and 8th, Ryan Searle pitched the final 1.2 innings. He got Cameron Warner to dribble a grounder toward third baseman Lin, who fired to Sutherland at first for the final out as Brisbane claimed their third successive Australian Baseball League Championship. Tim Atherton was named series MVP.

=== 2018–19 season ===
With the addition of the Auckland Tuatara and Geelong-Korea as expansion teams, the 2018–19 competition was split into Northeast and Southwest divisions. The league retained a 10-round, 40 game schedule, with teams playing division rivals eight times and inter division teams four times. The Brisbane Bandits were placed in the Northeast division with Sydney Blue Sox, Canberra Cavalry and Auckland Tuatara. A new playoff structure was announced 29 August 2018 with the addition of a single wild card game between the fourth and fifth seeds prior to two rounds of best-of-three finals series. The top seed awarded to the team with the best regular season record, with the other division winner awarded the second seed. The third and fourth seed were awarded to the two divisional runners up with the fifth seed being given to the team with the next best season record.

After splitting the series against Canberra in the second-last round, both Brisbane and Canberra held a 21–15 record, sitting behind Sydney on 23–13 in the Northeast division. In the final round of the regular season the Bandits swept Geelong-Korea, including a 23-5 opening match in which eight of the nine Bandits batting lineup hit home runs. In the Sydney Blue Sox corresponding series in Adelaide, the teams split the series. The Adelaide Bite won Game 1 (3-0) and Game 3 (3-2) but were beaten by the Blue Sox in Game 2 (2-12) and Game 4 (8-20). The series split meant the Bandits and Blue Sox would end the regular season with an identical 25 wins and 15 losses. A better head-to-head record (6-2) resulted in the Bandits claiming the Northeast division Championship and top seed for the playoffs.

In the playoffs, Brisbane hosted the wildcard winners, Canberra Cavalry, at Holloway Field in a best-of-three. In a replay of the previous season's Championship series, the hosts opened the scoring with back to back home runs to Donald Sutherland and Daniel De La Calle off Kyle Kinman in the 2nd inning. Ryan Bollinger pitched eight innings, allowing four hits and one run from a solo home run by Boss Moanaroa in the 5th inning. In Game 2, with the Bandits leading 4-3 heading into the eighth inning, Zach Wilson hit a two-run, one-out homer to give the Cavalry the lead. Despite a two-run homer for pinch hitter Donald Lutz in the bottom of the 8th, the Cavalry held firm for a 6–8 win. In Game 3, a two-run homer from Michael Crouse in the top of the 2nd inning was answered by back-to-back homers by Wade Dutton and Wynton Bernard in the bottom of the 2nd. Solo home runs to Canberra by Cam Warner (3rd inning), Robbie Perkins (4th inning) and David Kandilas (7th inning) would give the Cavalry at 5-3 heading into the bottom of the 7th inning. After striking out in the 5th inning, pinch hitter Donald Lutz would again be instrumental, crushing a two-run, one-out home run off J. R. Bunda to give the Bandits the lead. Donald Sutherland and Riley Unroe would follow up with solo homers in the 8th inning to secure the Bandits a place in their fourth straight Championship series.

Brisbane faced Perth Heat in the Championship series with Game 1 held in Perth at Harley-Davidson Ballpark. The Heat booked their Championship Series ticket after a 2-1 come-from-behind series win over the Sydney Blue Sox. The Bandits lead early scoring two second-inning runs. However, Perth bounced back immediately and soon found themselves level after Tim Kennelly scored on a passed ball in the third inning before driving in the tying run an inning later. A hopping ball allowed Brisbane to take a lead in the seventh inning before Loek van Mil and Ryan Searle collected the final nine outs to guide the Bandits home. In Game 2, Andrew Campbell, Wade Dutton and T. J. Bennett hit home runs for the Bandits, who blew Perth away with a six-run third inning to take an unassailable 8–0 lead. Starter Tim Atherton worked eight innings in another impressive outing, allowing just four runs on seven hits and two walks with 10 strikeouts. The Heat hit four solo home runs to cut into the lead, with Robbie Glendinning going deep twice while Pete Kozma and Chris Clare also homered, but they never really threatened. Atherton was named 2019 the series MVP after allowing four runs on seven hits and two walks with 10 strikeouts.

== See also ==
- List of current Australian Baseball League team rosters
