= Auckland Tuatara (baseball) =

Professional baseball team of New Zealand

- Logo

Information
- League: Australian Baseball League
- Location: Auckland, New Zealand
- Ballpark: North Harbour Stadium
- Founded: 2018
- Folded: 2023
- Colours: Teal; Navy blue
- Ownership: Baseball New Zealand
- Website: https://aucklandtuatara.com

The Auckland Tuatara were a professional baseball team in the Australian Baseball League based in Auckland, New Zealand. They were the only team from New Zealand to compete in the ABL, and one of two expansion teams that entered the league in the 2018–19 season. The team was liquidated and folded after the 2022–23 season.

== History ==
Prior to the team's foundation in 2018, Baseball New Zealand, the country's governing body of the sport of baseball, held talks starting in 2009 regarding the prospects of adding a New Zealand-based team in the Australian Baseball League. In November 2017, the league decided to expand to eight teams beginning in the 2018–19 season, and Baseball New Zealand was awarded a spot in the competition.

On 26 August 2018, the club's name was announced as the Auckland Tuatara, named after the oldest surviving species endemic to the country. According to one of the team's board members, Brett O'Riley, the tuatara was chosen as the name in order to celebrate the resilience of the ancient reptiles, and to raise awareness of New Zealand's commitment to species protection. The club's colours, teal and navy blue, are representative of the region's marine heritage. The Tuatara played its home games at McLeod Park in Te Atatū South for the 2018–19 season, and moved to an expanded North Harbour Stadium in Albany for the 2019–20 season and beyond. For baseball a section of seating was permanently removed and replaced by an outfield wall which is termed The Teal monster after the Green Monster wall in Boston.

The club's inaugural manager was announced as former MLB pitcher Steve Mintz.

Three days before the start of the 2019–20 season, Tuatara player Ryan Costello was found dead while asleep by teammates on 18 November 2019. Players wore 'RC' on their game jersey for the season in his memory.

Owing to the COVID-19 pandemic, the team sat out the 2020–21 and 2021–22 Australian Baseball League seasons. The team returned to action for the 2022–23 Australian Baseball League season, but went into liquidation following the season.

== Records ==
Names in Bold are players still active in the Australian Baseball League

=== Single season pitching records ===
Notable individual records set in one season, including all games between 2018 and 2023.

| | Record | Holder | Year |
|---|---|---|---|
| Most Strikeouts | 44 | Josh Collmenter | 2018–2019 |
| Lowest ERA | 1.09 | **Elliot Johnstone** | 2019–2020 |
| Most Wins | 4 | **Elliot Johnstone** | 2019–2020 |
| Most Losses | 6 | **Jimmy Boyce** | 2018–2019 |
| Most Innings Pitched | 55.1 | Josh Collmenter | 2018–2019 |
| Most Saves | 5 | Hever Bueno | 2019–2020 |

=== Career pitching records ===
Notable individual records set in a career, including all games between 2018 and 2023. To qualify, players must return for a second season.

| | Record | Holder | Year |
|---|---|---|---|
| Most Strikeouts | 84 | Josh Collmenter | 2018–2020 |
| Lowest ERA | 1.09 | Elliot Johnstone | 2018–2020 |
| Most Wins | 6 | Josh Collmenter | 2018–2020 |
| Most Losses | 7 | **Jimmy Boyce** | 2018–2020 |
| Most Innings Pitched | 104.1 | Josh Collmenter | 2018–2020 |
| Most Saves | 5 | **Elliot Johnstone** | 2019-2023 |
| Most Games | 29 | **Elliot Johnstone** | 2019-2023 |

=== Career hitting records ===
Notable individual records set in a career, including all games between 2018 and 2023. To qualify, players must return for a second season.

| | Record | Holder | Year |
|---|---|---|---|
| Highest Batting Average | .319 | **Andrew Marck** | 2018–2023 |
| Most Doubles | 12 | Kris Richards | 2018–2020 |
| Most Triples | 4 | Max Brown | 2018–2019 |
| Most Home Runs | 4 | Max Brown | 2018–2019 |
| Most Runs Batted In | 26 | Max Brown | 2018–2019 |
| Most Hits | 42 | **Andrew Marck** | 2019–2023 |
| Most Runs | 35 | Max Brown | 2018–2019 |
| Most Games Played | 76 | Max Brown | 2018–2019 |
| Most Stolen Bases | 12 | Max Brown | 2018–2019 |
| Most Strikeouts | 67 | Max Brown | 2018–2019 |
| Highest On-Base Percentage | .357 | **Andrew Marck** | 2018–2023 |
| Highest Slugging Percentage | .541 | Max Brown | 2018–2019 |
| Highest On-Base Plus Slugging Percentage | .741 | **Andrew Marck** | 2018–2023 |
| Most Total Bases | 78 | Max Brown | 2018–2019 |

=== Single season hitting records ===
Notable individual records set in one season, including all games between 2018 and 2023.

| | Record | Holder | Year |
|---|---|---|---|
| Highest Batting Average | .344 | Jared Walker | 2019–2020 |
| Most Doubles | 11 | Jared Walker, Kris Richards | 2019–2020, 2018-2019 |
| Most Triples | 3 | Max Brown | 2018–2019 |
| Most Home Runs | 10 | Won-Seok Kim | 2019–2020 |
| Most Runs Batted In | 33 | Jared Walker | 2019–2020 |
| Most Hits | 42 | Jared Walker | 2019–2020 |
| Most Runs Scored | 31 | Jared Walker | 2019–2020 |
| Most Stolen Bases | 12 | Eric Jenkins | 2018–2019 |
| Most Strikeouts | 46 | Zach Clark | 2018–2019 |
