= Diamond Sports Stadium =

Baseball stadium in Adelaide, Australia

Diamond Sports Stadium Bennett Field at Adelaide Shores
- Interactive map of Diamond Sports Stadium; Bennett Field at Adelaide Shores
- Location: Barratt Reserve, West Beach Road, West Beach, South Australia
- Coordinates: 34°56′52″S 138°30′30″E
- Operator: Diamond Sports SA Inc.
- Capacity: 5,000
- Surface: Grass
- Field size: Left Field - 294 feet (90 m); Center Field - 398 feet (121 m); Right Field - 293 feet (89 m)

Construction
- Renovated: 2016
- Expanded: 2016
- Cost: AU$4 million (renovation)

Tenant
- Adelaide Bite (ABL) (2016–present)

Diamond Sports Stadium (also known as Bennett Field at Adelaide Shores) is a 5,000 capacity baseball stadium located in West Beach, South Australia. The stadium is the venue of the Adelaide Giants who play in the Australian Baseball League. The stadium is located at Barratt Reserve on West Beach Road adjacent to the Adelaide International Airport.

== History ==
Prior to becoming the home of the Adelaide Bite for the 2016–17 Australian Baseball League season following their move from baseball's long time home of Norwood Oval due to renovations to the oval, the Diamond Sports Complex was and is the home to the Softball SA and is also the home to Baseball SA.

The venue received a AU$4 million grant from the Government of South Australia in 2016 which enabled Diamond Sports SA to upgrade the main baseball venue to Australian Baseball League standards.

== Facilities ==
The complex includes the 5,000 seat main baseball stadium, 2 fully skinned softball diamonds with playing surface levels of Australian National Softball standard, and a 900 sqm indoor training facility as well as a multipurpose baseball/softball diamond.

== Dimensions ==
Left Field - 320 feet (98 m)
Center Field - 390 feet (119 m)
Right Field - 320 feet (98 m)
