= Australian Baseball League =

Professional baseball league in Australia

Australian Baseball League (ABL)
- Upcoming season or competition: 2026–27 ABL season
- Formerly: Australian Baseball League
- Sport: Baseball
- Founded: 2009; 17 years ago
- Founder: Australian Baseball Federation & Major League Baseball
- First season: 2010–11
- Owner: Baseball Australia
- CEO: Glenn Williams
- COO: Michael Crooks
- No. of teams: 4
- Country: Australia
- Continent: Australia
- Most recent champion: Adelaide Giants (3rd title)
- Most titles: Brisbane Bandits, Perth Heat (4 titles)
- Qualification: Asia Series (2011–2013)
- Broadcasters: MLB Network (United States); Sky Sport (New Zealand); Eleven Sports (Taiwan); MBC Sports+ (South Korea)
- Streaming partners: Baseball+ YouTube; Streamer
- Related competitions: Claxton Shield
- Website: theabl.com.au

The Australian Baseball League (ABL) is a professional baseball league in Australia. The league is governed by the Australian Baseball Federation (ABF). It uses the same name as a now-defunct competition held during the 1990s, and though it shares some history of the original league with the Claxton Shield awarded to winners of both competitions, it is considered to be a separate competition.

Because the ABL's season takes place from November to February, the ABL is one of baseball's recognised winter leagues (although it is summer in Australia when the season takes place), where minor-league prospects in North America are often assigned as an English-speaking alternative to the primary Spanish-speaking Latin America-based winter leagues.

== Organisation ==
The ABL was originally jointly owned by Major League Baseball (75%) and the Australian Baseball Federation (25%) before the ABF became the sole owners prior to the 2016–17 season. Rather than following more traditional models of the franchises being owned privately by individuals or organisations, the league is the owner of each team. One of the rationales for this structure is to closely manage the financial situation, helping to ensure that all teams are equally viable. It is expected that this arrangement will continue for at least the first five seasons: the period of time covered by the financial commitment made by MLB and the ABF.

As a result of the central ownership of the teams, all players are paid by the league. This is to ensure that no team receives an unfair advantage over any other with regards to financial success. The pay scale has set a number of tiers which group players of similar experience levels, with all players in the same tier receiving the same pay. The ABL has considered the possibility of having one or two marquee players paid above the standard scale, though no final decision has been made with regard to this. One concern about high rates of pay expressed by the ABF was that it was a contributing factor, if not the main factor, in the failure of the previous Australian Baseball League. ABF management has also expressed the concern that if this league were to fail, there may never be another opportunity for professional baseball in Australia.

== History ==
Baseball was brought to Australia by American gold miners and played on the gold fields of Ballarat for fun on their rest days in the 1850s. Cricketers Gaggin & Goldsmith tried to play baseball at Yarra Park, Melbourne in 1867, but Australian rules football fans arriving for the adjacent football disrupted the games. The first series of full competitive games of baseball by Australians were played by members of the Surry Baseball Club on Moore Park and by members of the NSW Cricket Association on the adjacent Sydney Cricket Ground in June/July 1878. In 1881, American residents formed a Union Baseball Club and a year later with Australians, formed a Sydney Baseball Club with U.S. Consul Gilderoy Wells Griffin forming a NSW Baseball Association in 1885. Following the A.G. Spalding tour by the Chicago White Sox and All-America teams in 1888 & 1889, Harry Simpson stayed in Australia, formed baseball clubs in Melbourne, Adelaide, Broken Hill, and eventually Sydney with competition games being played. Simpson also travelled to New Zealand to promote baseball. When he suddenly died in September 1891, after setting up the NSW Baseball League, it was a New Zealander, Tony Chuck, who took his place in Australia.

=== Original league ===
The original Australian Baseball League commenced in 1989. At the time, it replaced the Claxton Shield as the top baseball competition in the country, with eight teams from Adelaide, Brisbane, Gold Coast, Melbourne, Perth and Sydney. Over the course of the league's life, teams were also based in Canberra and Newcastle, with the number of teams competing in any one season varying from six to nine. Only four teams contested each of the ten seasons, with the others folding due to financial problems, or due to a lack of a suitable venue for home games.

The financial difficulties were not restricted to the clubs, as the league was forced to close after the summer of 2000. Running at a loss of $2 million a season, the rights to the league were sold to Dave Nilsson—an Australian Major League Baseball player with the Milwaukee Brewers at the time—for a reported A$5 million.

=== Formation ===
On 1 July 2009, a joint press-conference was held by the ABF, MLB and Australian Federal Government at the Palm Meadows Baseball Complex on the Gold Coast in Queensland, the site of the Major League Baseball Australian Academy Program (MLBAAP). During the conference the intention to resurrect a national baseball league for Australia was announced, with the Government announcing $400,000 towards the new league. Though some sources reported that the new league could be running as early as October 2010, there had been no official timeframe released for the new league to commence.

Initial reports suggested the competition would likely include between eight and ten teams from around Australia. Discussions were held between the ABF and Baseball New Zealand about the possibility of a team based in New Zealand being included in the competition. The offer, however, was declined on the basis that there was not sufficient infrastructure, specifically citing the need for a suitable stadium and a major sponsor for the team. The possibility of a New Zealand team joining the competition at some point in the future had not been ruled out though. Auckland Tuatara joined in 2018.

There were additional concerns about the viability of a team based in South Australia, primarily based on the lack of a suitable stadium with lights to be able to play night games. This, along with playing on baseball-specific grounds — as opposed to playing on temporarily converted rugby league grounds as had been the case in the old ABL — was seen as a necessary requirement to insure the long-term profitability of the competition.

In August 2009, a bid process was launched by the Australian Capital Territory Baseball Association (ACTBA) for a team to be based in Canberra with the name and motto of "Let's Do It Canberra". The bid was not in competition with any other bids, but was required to meet certain minimum standards, such as fan and sponsorship support, to be successful and join the other five teams from Adelaide, Brisbane, Melbourne, Perth and Sydney that were at the time confirmed. On 18 November 2009, it was announced by the ABF that the Canberra bid was successful, confirming that the inaugural season would include six teams.

In December 2009, a competition was launched for fans to decide the names of the foundation franchises, called "Name Your ABL Team". For each franchise, four team-name options were available to choose from, in addition to being able to enter another name created by the entrant. In August 2010, the names of the teams were announced, along with team logos and colours: Adelaide Bite, Brisbane Bandits, Canberra Cavalry, Melbourne Aces, Perth Heat, and Sydney Blue Sox.

=== List of champions ===
Season	Championship Series				Other postseason participants			Helms Award Winner (League MVP)
Season	Champions	Series result	Runners-up	Series MVP	3rd place	4th place	5th place	Helms Award Winner (League MVP)
2010–11; Details	Perth Heat	2–1	Adelaide Bite	Benjamin Moore (Perth)	Sydney Blue Sox	Melbourne Aces	—	James McOwen (Adelaide)
2011–12; Details	Perth Heat	2–1	Melbourne Aces	Virgil Vasquez (Perth)	Sydney Blue Sox	Adelaide Bite	—	Tim Kennelly (Perth)
2012–13; Details	Canberra Cavalry	2–0	Perth Heat	Aaron Sloan (Canberra)	Sydney Blue Sox	—	—	Adam Buschini (Canberra)
2013–14; Details	Perth Heat	2–0	Canberra Cavalry	Joey Wong (Perth)	Sydney Blue Sox	—	—	Ryan Casteel (Melbourne)
2014–15; Details	Perth Heat	2–1	Adelaide Bite	Allan de San Miguel (Perth)	Sydney Blue Sox	—	—	Aaron Miller (Adelaide)
2015–16; Details	Brisbane Bandits	2–0	Adelaide Bite	Donald Lutz (Brisbane)	Canberra Cavalry	—	—	Justin Williams (Brisbane)
2016–17; Details	Brisbane Bandits	2–0	Melbourne Aces	Logan Wade (Brisbane)	Adelaide Bite	—	—	Aaron Whitefield (Brisbane)
2017–18; Details	Brisbane Bandits	2–1	Canberra Cavalry	Tim Atherton (Brisbane)	Perth Heat	Melbourne Aces	—	Jake Fraley (Perth)
2018–19; Details	Brisbane Bandits	2–0	Perth Heat	Tim Atherton (Brisbane)	Sydney Blue Sox	Canberra Cavalry	Melbourne Aces	Tim Kennelly (Perth); Markus Solbach (Adelaide)
2019–20; Details	Melbourne Aces	2–0	Adelaide Giants	Shane Robinson (Melbourne)	Auckland Tuatara	Canberra Cavalry	Perth Heat	Aaron Whitefield (Adelaide)
2020–21	Melbourne Aces	1–0	Perth Heat	Tyler Beardsley (Melbourne)	Canberra Cavalry	Adelaide Giants	Sydney Blue Sox	Darryl George (Melbourne)
2021–22	Season cancelled							
2022–23	Adelaide Giants	2–1	Perth Heat	Jordan McArdle (Adelaide)	Auckland Tuatara	Brisbane Bandits	—	Alex Hall (Perth)
2023–24	Adelaide Giants	2–1	Perth Heat	Todd Van Steensel (Adelaide)	Brisbane Bandits	Melbourne Aces	—	Lachlan Wells (Adelaide)
2024–25	Canberra Cavalry	2–0	Perth Heat	Colten Davis (Canberra)	Sydney Blue Sox	Adelaide Giants	—	Alex Wells (Sydney)
2025–26	Adelaide Giants	2–1	Sydney Blue Sox	Devin Saltiban (Adelaide)	—	—	—	Eric Rataczak (Sydney)
2026–27	TBD				TBD			

=== Career records ===
Batting leaders
Stat	Player (Note: Correct as of end of 24/25 season)	Team	Total
G	Tim Kennelly	Perth Heat	453
HR	Tim Kennelly	Perth Heat	63
RBI	Tim Kennelly	Perth Heat	254
R	Tim Kennelly	Perth Heat	331
H	Tim Kennelly	Perth Heat	509
SB	Aaron Whitefield	Brisbane Bandits Adelaide Bite Melbourne Aces	97

Pitching leaders
Stat	Player (Note: Correct as of end of 24/25 season)	Team	Total
W	Daniel Schmidt	Perth Heat	40
L	Craig Anderson	Sydney Blue Sox	33
ER	Daniel Schmidt	Perth Heat	247
K	Tim Atherton	Sydney Blue Sox Canberra Cavalry Brisbane Bandits	478
IP	Craig Anderson	Sydney Blue Sox	556 2/3
SV	Todd Van Steensel	Sydney Blue Sox Adelaide Bite	46

=== Single-season records ===
Batting leaders
Stat	Player (Note: Minimum 2.7 PAs per team game. Correct as of 2025–26 Australian Baseball League season)	Team	Total
AVG	Jay Baum	Canberra Cavalry	.439
HR	T.J. Bennett	Brisbane Bandits	17
RBI	Adam Buschini	Canberra Cavalry	50
R	Jake Fraley	Perth Heat	50
H	Brian Burgamy Riley Unroe	Canberra Cavalry Brisbane Bandits	67
SB	Jake Fraley	Perth Heat	39

Pitching leaders
Stat	Player (Note: Minimum 0.8 IP per team game. Correct as of 2025–26 Australian Baseball League season)	Team	Total
W	Josh Tols	Adelaide Bite	9
L	Jong-Mu Park	Geelong-Korea	10
ERA	Ryan Searle	Brisbane Bandits	0.40
K	Chris Oxspring Mark Hamburger	Sydney Blue Sox Melbourne Aces	86
IP	Matt Larkins	Melbourne Aces	97
SV	Ryan Searle	Brisbane Bandits	17

== Season structure ==
=== Regular season ===
For the inaugural season, the regular season was played from November through to January over ten weeks, similarly to the 2010 season of the Claxton Shield. With the expansion from five to six teams, each team played every week as opposed to the two bye weeks the teams had previously. In addition, rather than a three-game series each week, the series were four games each, resulting in each team playing 40 games over the season. As had been the case in 2010, the majority of games were played on Fridays and Saturdays, though some games were also played on Thursdays and Sundays, depending on the team hosting and whether or not a doubleheader was included in the series.

The 2011–12 season largely followed the same format as the 2010–11 season, with only minor changes. Though the opening game of the season was scheduled again be the only game played that day, the whole series was played over the same weekend along with the first series for each of the other four teams. To allow for the Perth Heat's participation in the Asia Series, each of the teams had a bye weekend during the first half of the season. The season expanded from 40 to 45 games per team; one of the two series played against each opponent expanded from 4 to 5 games.

The 2012–13 season also had minor modifications from the previous season. Each team's bye weekends were in the first three rounds of competition, and each series held during these weekends were only 3 games long, and were billed as "... against their two closest geographical neighbours; building upon both traditional and newly established rivalries." The match-ups for these games echoed the divisions used in the 2008 Claxton Shield, where teams based in Brisbane, Canberra and Sydney were in the Eastern Division, and teams from Adelaide, Melbourne and Perth were in the Southern Division. The remaining 10 weeks were made up of 4-game series, like the 2010–11 season. By the end of the season, each team had played each other team at least eight times, with an additional three against both of their geographic rivals.

=== All-Star Game ===
In the league's second season, it was announced that an All-Star Game would take place, to be held in Perth on 21 December 2011. Like the Major League Baseball All-Star Game, it would be held midway through the regular season, and would feature the best players in the league. Rather than the teams in the All-Star Game being made up of players from certain teams, the game would be contested by Team Australia and a team of World All-Stars, selected from the import or international players participating in the ABL at the time.

All-Star Game results
Season	Venue	Host team	Game result			Most Valuable Player			Ref
Season	Venue	Host team	Winning team	Score	Losing team	Player	All-Star Game team	ABL team	Ref
2011–12; Details	(Western Australia); Perth	Perth Heat	World All-Stars	8–5	Team Australia	Tyler Collins	World All-Stars	Sydney Blue Sox	
2012–13; Details	(Victoria (state)); Melbourne	Melbourne Aces	Team Australia	6–4	World All-Stars	Brad Harman	Team Australia	Melbourne Aces	
2013–14; Details	(Victoria (state)); Melbourne	Melbourne Aces	World All-Stars	6–0	Team Australia	Joey Wong	World All-Stars	Perth Heat	
2014–15; Details	(Victoria (state)); Melbourne	Melbourne Aces	Team Australia	11–8	World All-Stars	Brad Harman	Team Australia	Melbourne Aces	
2015–16; Details	(Victoria (state)); Melbourne	Melbourne Aces	Team Australia	3–2	World All-Stars	Trent D'Antonio	Team Australia	Sydney Blue Sox	
2016–17; Details	(Victoria (state)); Melbourne	Melbourne Aces	Team Australia	2–1	World All-Stars	Stefan Welch	Team Australia	Adelaide Bite	
2017–18; Details	(Victoria (state)); Melbourne	Melbourne Aces	World All-Stars	6–4	Team Australia	Jay Baum	World All-Stars	Canberra Cavalry	

=== Postseason ===
For the first two ABL seasons, the postseason involved the top four teams in a three-round structure following the Page playoff system. In the inaugural season, each round consisted of a best–of–three-game series between the respective teams, however this was changed in 2011–12 such that the first two rounds were decided in a best–of–five series, with the championship series remaining best–of–three. The first- and second-placed teams played each other in the major semi-final series, with the winner proceeding directly to the championship series and the loser to the preliminary final series. The winner of the minor semi-final series between the third- and fourth-placed teams also went to the preliminary final series, while the loser was eliminated. Likewise, the winner of the preliminary final series qualified for the championship series, the loser eliminated.

The third season used a shortened format from the two previous seasons. Only the top three teams qualified for a two-round postseason, with each round consisting of a best–of–three-game series. The first-placed team directly qualified for the championship series, and the second- and third-placed teams played each other in the preliminary final series, the winner of which qualified for the second place in the championship series.

For the 2017–18 season, the ABL announced that the top four teams at the end of the regular home and away season would qualify for the semifinals, providing more opportunities for teams to compete for Championship glory. Teams will be seeded from #1 to #4 based on their record and finishing order in the home and away season. The #1 Seed and #2 Seed will be awarded home semi-finals, and will host all three games in a best of three series. The ABLCS will be a home and away split series with the Highest Seeded Winner awarded the choice to host either Game 1, OR Games 2 and 3.

Postseason structure for 2010–11 and 2011–12 seasons

Semi-Final Series
1	First place team
2	Second place team
3	Third place team
4	Fourth place team

Premliminary Final Series
L-A	Loser major semi-final series
W-B	Winner minor semi-final series

Championship Series
W-A	Winner major semi-final series
W-C	Winner preliminary final series

Postseason structure 2012–13 season – 2016–17 season

Preliminary Final Series		Championship Series
		1	First placed team
2	Second placed team	WP	Winner preliminary final series
3	Third placed team

Postseason structure 2017–18 and 2022-23 season to present

Semi-Final Series
1	First place team
4	Fourth place team
2	Second place team
3	Third place team

Championship Series
W-A	Winner semi-final A
W-B	Winner semi-final B

Postseason structure 2018-19 season – 2021-22 season

Wildcard Series
4	Worst Second-Place team
5	Best Third-Place team

Semi-Final Series
1	Best First Place team
W-WC	Winner Wildcard
2	Worst First-Place team
3	Best Second-Place Team

Championship Series
W-A	Winner Semi-Final A
W-B	Winner Semi-Final B

The winner of the championship series is named the ABL Champion for that season, and is awarded the Claxton Shield; the prize given to the top Australian baseball team since 1934.

In the 2018–19 season, a Wild Card game was added as part of the league's expansion to 8 teams with the winner advancing to the divisional semi-finals, and Canberra won the inaugural game against the Melbourne Aces.

=== Asia Series ===
After the inaugural ABL season had been completed, it was announced that the league's champions each season would be invited to the restarted Asia Series. The event had previously been contested between the winners of Nippon Professional Baseball's (NPB) Japan Series, Korea Professional Baseball's (KBO) Korean Series, Chinese Professional Baseball League's (CPBL) Taiwan Series, and China Baseball League's (CBL) championship series. The 2011 tournament did not feature the CBL's champions, but officials stated that a team would participate in future editions. Unlike all four previous editions of the tournament which were held in Japan, the 2011 edition was held in Taiwan. The tournament follows a round-robin format, where each team plays each other once. The top two teams then face each other in a single game to decide the champion.

The Asia Series is held in November, which would otherwise create a conflict for the ABL champion team as the following season would have already commenced. To avoid this, the League announced that during the 2011–12 season, the Perth Heat—2010–11 champions—would be scheduled to have a bye while competing in Taiwan.

== Roster formation ==
In any regular four-game series (or fewer), the players eligible to play, or 'Active List', is limited to 22 players. Three ineligible 'Reserve List' players are named on each roster that may replace an active player mid-series due to injury or a reserve player completing a suspension. In addition to the Active List, four 'Development List' players may be named to play during the series. These development list players must be 23 years of age or younger, have Australian citizenship or residency and not yet accumulated 130 at-bats or 50 innings pitched. Such development players are not eligible to appear in extra innings games.

The majority of the rosters in the league are made up of local and international players who play their northern hemisphere summer in North America's Major League Baseball, Minor League Baseball, the South Korean KBO, the Japanese NPB, the Taiwanese CPBL, European baseball, or one of the various independent baseball leagues. In addition, many local amateurs who are formerly professional or play in the regional amateur club teams make up the balance of these rosters.

Since the inaugural season, there have been limitations on the number of internationals or 'imports' either on an active roster or any given game. As of 2018, a cumulative points system is in place to limit the number of foreign born players over the course of a season. 150 points may be used cumulatively over the season's ten series.

For the 2020–2021 season only, this was changed to 360 points used on a per game basis across 24 regular season games. Non-affiliated overseas players were also changed from 4 points to 2.

Season Roster Limitations (150 points / season)
Level	Level of Play	Player Points
1	Marquee Players	0
2	Australian National Identified Players	-1
3	All other Oceanic Players	-2
4	Asian League Players (CPBL, KBO, NPB)	1
5	MLB Affiliated Players	2
6	All other players	4

Teams may nominate two Marquee Players who were either:

- On an MLB active roster that year, previous MLB All-Star, or 5 + years' MLB service time
- A CPBL, NPB or KBO contracted player, previous All-Star or 5 + years' service time in those leagues.

In addition to Australian players, New Zealand citizens and residents are considered native players for Auckland and South Korean players for Geelong.

== Media coverage ==
As of the 2023–24 season, the live coverage is provided by:

- Baseball+ (worldwide)

For the inaugural season, there had been no television coverage of regular season games, either live, delayed or in a regular highlights package review format, despite having been in negotiations with Fox Sports and Network 10. After completing negotiations for live television coverage of the finals, the championship series was broadcast live on Fox Sports.

On 1 November 2010, Sydney community radio station Triple H FM announced it would provide live broadcasts of Sydney Blue Sox home matches as well as Canberra Cavalry's home series against the Blue Sox, Melbourne Aces and Perth Heat—the weeks Sydney was away from home. PerthNow's radio station SportFM announced it would cover the Perth Heat spring training games as well as the opening game of every Heat home series.

The Adelaide Bite, Brisbane Bandits and Perth Heat provided free audio and video streaming through internet website Ustream.

For the second season, Fox Sports expanded its television coverage of the ABL to include the All-Star Game in addition to the championship series. The game was also carried live via ESPN Star Sports in China, India and Taiwan. It was shown on delay in the United States on the MLB Network, as well as also being shown on delay in Japan and South Korea. The international television coverage of the championship series expanded from that of the All-Star Game, with Hong Kong, Indonesia, Malaysia, and Philippines also getting live coverage through ESPN Star Sports, with several additional countries in Asia and Oceania including New Zealand getting delayed television coverage. The Australian Broadcasting Corporation (ABC) introduced live radio coverage of the championship series via the digital ABC Radio Grandstand station. In recent years, ABL coverage of its All-Star Game and championship series has expanded to Canada through SportsNet (effectively simulcasting MLB Network in the United States).

For the 2015—16 season, one Sunday match for each of the last five regular season rounds was shown live nationally on ESPN Australia. This marked the first time in the franchise's history that regular season matches had been shown on television. In addition, all five were also aired live in Asia via Fox Sports Asia, while three of the matches were shown live in the U.S. on the MLB Network.

ESPN has broadcast live the 2013–14, 2014–15, and 2015–16 Championship series'. In addition, the 2014–15 and 2015–16 series' were broadcast in the United States on MLB Network and online on MLB.com, and in Asia on Fox Sports Asia.

According to Ministry of Sport, the 2018/19 ABL season became the most viewed since its inception.

In 2022, it was announced that Baseball Australia and Sportradar would be launching a streaming service that would broadcast every ABL game beginning with the 2023–24 season.

== Current clubs ==
Though the locations for the six teams had been known for some time previously, it was not until 5 August 2010 that the names of the teams were announced. Websites were also launched on the same day for each of the teams with the exception of the Perth Heat, which had been the name of the Western Australian team playing in the Claxton Shield since 2006, as well as being one of the franchises from the original ABL, contesting all ten seasons. The Brisbane Bandits is also a reintroduction of a team name from the original ABL that participated in all but the final season.

Prior to being renamed the Giants, the Adelaide Bite used a name that the South Australia state baseball team has previously used at various times in the Claxton Shield, which in turn refers both to the great white shark common to South Australian waters as well as the geographic feature, the Great Australian Bight. Likewise, the Melbourne Aces uses the Victoria state baseball team's moniker from Claxton Shield competitions past. The Canberra Cavalry and the Sydney Blue Sox both use names not previously used in Australian baseball at the national level.

Prior to the 2016–17 ABL season, the Adelaide Bite's home ground, Norwood Oval (known as Coopers Stadium due to sponsorship) was the only ABL venue not built specifically for baseball use. Norwood Oval is the long time home of Australian rules football team the Norwood Redlegs who play in Adelaide major local competition the South Australian National Football League (SANFL). The oval however, due to having lights installed, has generally been the main venue for baseball in Adelaide since 1951. Although the oval has a normal spectator capacity of 22,000 for football, due to the configuration of the baseball diamond spectators are not permitted beyond the outfield fence and capacity is generally restricted to around 10–15,000 for ABL games still making it easily the largest capacity venue in the league. For the 2016–17 season the Adelaide Bite moved from Norwood Oval to the purpose-built Diamond Sports Stadium.

Auckland Tuatara and Geelong-Korea both folded following the 2022–23 Australian Baseball League season.

Following the 2024–25 Australian Baseball League season, the Melbourne Aces announced that they would be leaving the ABL but would independently compete in the Ulsan KBO Fall League and against KBO teams in Australia. A month later, the league confirmed that the Canberra Cavalry would also be giving up their license. The league stated that the four remaining teams still as well as a "potential new owner" still desired to compete in a four team league. Although the Sydney Blue Sox had previously announced that Darren MacBeth would be stepping down as owner, the league stated that the team would still compete under unnamed new ownership.

Team	City	Stadium	Capacity	Founded	Joined	Notes
Adelaide Giants	Adelaide, South Australia	Diamond Sports Stadium; Norwood Oval (occasional)	5,000; 22,000	2009	2010	
Brisbane Bandits	Brisbane, Queensland	Holloway Field; Brisbane Exhibition Ground (occasional)	1,500; 26,000	2009	2010	
Perth Heat	Perth, Western Australia	Empire BallPark	4,000	1989	2010	
Sydney Blue Sox	Sydney, New South Wales	Blue Sox Stadium	3,000	2009	2010	

=== Potential expansion ===
In November 2017, the league officially announced plans to add two more teams for the 2018–19 season. The expanded eight team league will continue to work with partners around the region. On 6 April 2018, it was announced that a New Zealand team based in Auckland would be joining the league for the 2018–19 season. On 18 May 2018, it was announced that an all-Korean team based in Geelong would be joining the league for the 2018–19 season.

After the expansion of the league into Auckland and Geelong in the 2018–19 season the league immediately benefited from an exponential increase in viewership numbers and has looked to expand to ten teams as early as the 2020–21 season. An additional two teams would be similar to the Geelong-Korea concept; a foreign sponsored roster based in an Australian city. These teams would have Japanese, Taiwanese or even Chinese comprised rosters.

The league has publicly stated the most likely expansion to ten teams would be based in regional Australia, being either Tasmania, Wollongong, Alice Springs or a second team in either far south or north Queensland.

A second team in New Zealand, Lismore, Newcastle and the Gold Coast have also been mentioned as other potential expansion cities.

=== Women's Australian Baseball League ===
In October 2018, it was announced by Baseball Australia that it was working towards a women's ABL and began a process of crowd funding to help kick start the league with the support of sponsors and partners. In September 2019, it was announced that the league with a name to confirmed would begin in the 2021 financial year, most likely following the conclusion of the 2020–21 Australian Baseball League season.

Four teams were confirmed to be a part of the first season with licenses were granted to the Adelaide Giants, Brisbane Bandits, Canberra Cavalry and Baseball Victoria. Auckland, Geelong, Perth and Sydney opted against submitting a team in the inaugural competition, but expressed interest in joining after the first season. The Melbourne Aces were not part of the licensing process due to a then ongoing change of management.

Exhibition games and testing are set to take place during the 2020 Women's Nationals and beyond.

== Major partners and sponsors ==
=== Naming rights sponsors ===
Sponsor	Naming Rights	Resulting Name	Ref
Alcohol Think Again	Perth Heat	Alcohol Think Again Perth Heat	
SA Power Networks	Adelaide Giants	Adelaide Giants	
	Melbourne Aces	Melbourne Aces	
	Canberra Cavalry	Canberra Cavalry	
	Sydney Blue Sox	Sydney Blue Sox	
Couran Cove Island Resort	Brisbane Bandits	Couran Cove Brisbane Bandits	

=== Licensed sponsors & suppliers ===
- New Era – Caps
- Brett Bros Sport - Bats, balls and protective gear
- Kayo Sports - Broadcast partner (Australia)
- Virgin Australia - Airline partner
- Hertz - Rental car partner

== See also ==
- Australian Baseball League (1989–1999)
- Claxton Shield
- International Baseball League of Australia
