= Sport in New Zealand =

Sport in New Zealand largely reflects the nation's British colonial heritage, with some of the most popular sports being rugby union, rugby league, cricket, football, footy, basketball, horse racing and netball, which are primarily played in Commonwealth countries. New Zealand has enjoyed success in many sports, notably rugby union (considered the national sport), rugby league, cricket, America's Cup sailing, world championship and Olympics events, and motorsport. Rugby union is the most popular sport in New Zealand.

Other popular sports include squash, golf, hockey, tennis, cycling and tramping, baseball and a variety of water sports, particularly sailing, rowing, and surf sports. Winter sports such as skiing and snowboarding are also popular, as are indoor and outdoor bowls.

== Administration ==
Sport New Zealand is the main government agency responsible for governing sport and recreation in New Zealand. It was established in 2003 by the Sport and Recreation New Zealand Act 2002, consolidating three agencies into one, and was known as Sport and Recreation New Zealand (SPARC) until February 2012.

== Participation ==
School Sport NZ runs an annual census of sport participation amongst secondary school students (age 13 to 18). The data only includes students that had a "meaningful engagement" in the sport, e.g. representing their school in a team.

NZSSSC census, 2024 school year
Sport	Total	By gender		Change (2020–24)
Sport	Total	Girls	Boys	Change (2020–24)
Netball	29,459	28,058	1,401	▲ +17.2%
Volleyball	27,394	16,946	10,448	▲ +23.7%
Basketball	27,287	6,887	20,410	▲ +12.7%
Rugby union	27,074	4,834	22,240	▲ +12.5%
Football	24,991	7,698	17,294	▲ +20%
Hockey	13,828	7,509	6,319	▲ +2.2%
Badminton	13,788	7,494	6,294	▲ +42.1%
Touch	12,215	5,831	6,384	▲ +4.2%
Athletics	9,359	4,191	5,170	▼ −5.5%
Cricket	9,134	2,049	7,085	▼ −1.9%
Futsal	8,822	2,868	5,954	▲ +24.4%
Tennis	5,249	2,649	2,600	▲ +8.6%
Rugby sevens	5,220	2,081	3,139	▼ −0.2%
Cross country	4,901	2,464	2,437	▲ +94.5%
Kī-o-rahi	4,716	2,194	2,522	▲ +52.2%
Rowing	4,517	2,360	2,157	▲ +11%
Swimming	3,538	1,663	1,881	▲ +5.4%
Rugby league	3,281	784	2,497	▲ +66%
Water polo	3,267	1,521	1,746	▲ +0.5%
3x3 basketball	2,796	826	1,970	n/a

== Major sports ==
=== Rugby union ===
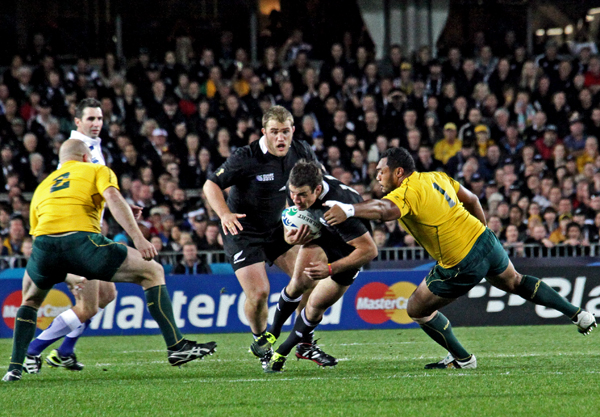
All Blacks vs Australia at the 2011 Rugby World Cup

Rugby union is the national sport in New Zealand. It has the largest spectator following of all sports in New Zealand. New Zealand's men's national rugby team, the All Blacks, has the best winning record of any men's national team in the world, and is currently ranked second in the world. The All Blacks won the first Rugby World Cup in 1987, and again on home soil in 2011. They won their third World Cup in 2015 in England, becoming the first holders to successfully defend their title. The All Blacks traditionally perform a haka, a Māori challenge, at the start of international matches. This practice has been mimicked by several other national teams, notably the national rugby league team, and the basketball teams. New Zealand's women's national rugby team, the Black Ferns, also has the best winning record of any women's national team in the world, and is currently ranked second in the world. The Black Ferns have won a record six championships at the Women's Rugby World Cup in 1998, 2002, 2006, 2010, 2017, and 2021.

Outside Test matches, there are three widely followed competitions:

- Super Rugby (previously Super 6, Super 10, Super 12, and Super 14), the elite club competition in the southern hemisphere. It has involved teams from New Zealand, Australia and South Africa since its formation, and in 2016 added teams in Argentina and Japan (with the Japan team also playing select "home" matches in Singapore). It is played from summer right through until winter (February to August), with a three-week break in June for international tests to take place.
- Mitre 10 Cup (previously Air New Zealand Cup and ITM Cup), created in 2006 as a successor to the National Provincial Championship (NPC), involves professional provincial New Zealand teams and is played mainly during the Winter and spring months, from August to November.
- Heartland Championship, an amateur competition of lower-level New Zealand provincial teams, also created in 2006 as a successor to the NPC and is also played in the winter and spring months, from August to November.

In the sevens variant of rugby union, the men's national team has been the main force in the sport since the creation of the World Rugby Sevens Series in 1999, winning the World Series 12 times in its 16 seasons. They have also won the Rugby World Cup Sevens thrice, in 2001, 2013 and the most recent edition in 2018, and won the first four gold medals awarded in sevens at the Commonwealth Games (1998–2010). The country also hosts one round of the World Series each season at Westpac Stadium in Wellington. In women's sevens, the national team is about as dominant as the men; they won the first three editions of the World Rugby Women's Sevens Series (2013–2015) and are the current holders of the Rugby World Cup Sevens, winning the women's tournaments in 2013 and 2018. New Zealand hosted the 2021 Women's Rugby World Cup.

=== Cricket ===
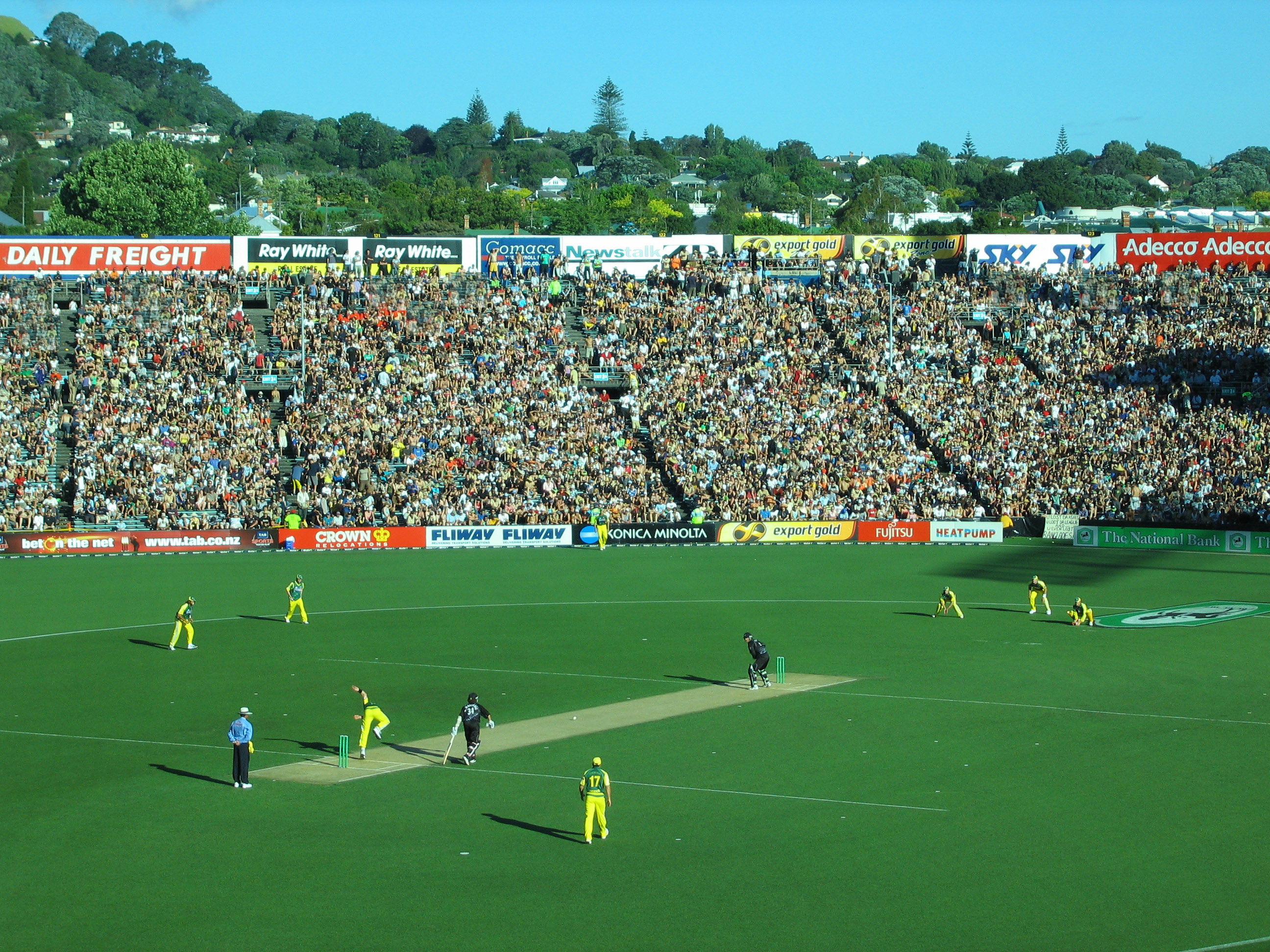
Australia vs New Zealand at Eden Park

Cricket is the national summer sport and the second most popular sport in New Zealand, which is one of twelve countries competing in Test match cricket. The provincial competition is not nearly as widely followed as rugby.

Historically, the national cricket team has not been as successful as the national rugby team. New Zealand played its first Test in 1930, but had to wait until 1956 until its first Test victory. The national team began to have more success in the 1970s and 1980s. New Zealand's most famous cricketer, the fast bowler Richard Hadlee.

New Zealand has traditionally been stronger in one-day cricket, having reached the final of both the 2015 and 2019 ICC Men's Cricket World Cups, beating South Africa and India in the semi-finals but ultimately losing to Australia and England in the final respectively. (They tied the match in 2019 but lost on boundary countback). The team also won the 2000 edition of the ICC Champions Trophy and reached the 2009 final, and won the bronze medal at the 1998 Commonwealth Games.

Martin Crowe and Kane Williamson won the 'Player of the Tournament' award in the 1992 Cricket World Cup and 2019 Cricket World Cup respectively. Geoff Allott was the highest wicket taker in the 1999 Cricket World Cup along with Shane Warne. Fast bowler Kyle Mills is the highest wicket taker in ICC Champions Trophy matches. Martin Guptill was the highest run-scorer in the 2015 Cricket World Cup and even broke the record of the highest score in World Cup matches during his knock of 237 against West Indies in the quarter-final. Trent Boult was the highest wicket taker in the 2015 Cricket World Cup along with Mitchell Starc. Kyle Jamieson was the Player of the Match in the 2019–2021 ICC World Test Championship final.

In Twenty20 cricket, New Zealand has twice reached the semi-finals of the ICC T20 World Cup, doing so in 2007 and 2016, and has reached the final in 2021 ICC Men's T20 World Cup by defeating England in the semi-final.

In June 2021, they beat India in the ICC World Test Championship Final in Southampton to become the inaugural World Test champions. They were hence ranked the number one Test team in the world. New Zealand has won two multinational ICC tournaments- 2000 edition (now referred to as ICC Champions Trophy) under Stephen Fleming and ICC World Test Championship under Kane Williamson.

New Zealand's men's team, the Blackcaps, have neither won the ICC Men's Cricket World Cup, nor have they won the ICC T20 World Cup. They did win the ICC World Test Championship in 2021 and ICC Champions Trophy in 2000.

New Zealand's women's team, the White Ferns have reached the final of ICC Women's Cricket World Cup four times, winning the 2000 edition of the tournament. They also managed to win the ICC Women's T20 World Cup in 2024.

There is also a London New Zealand Cricket Club based in London, England, for New Zealanders living in or based in the United Kingdom.

=== Netball ===
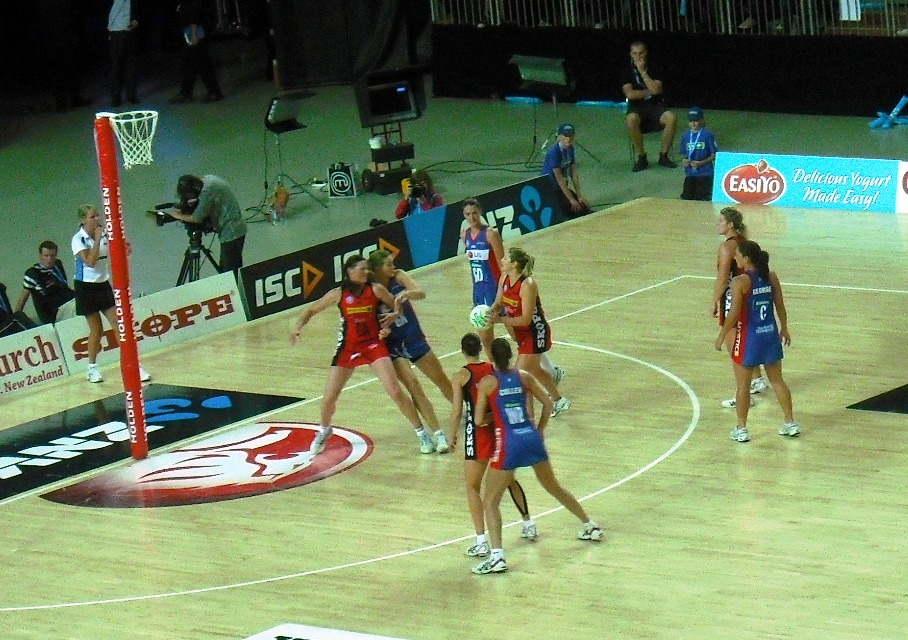
ANZ Championship match between the Tactix and Mystics

Netball is the most popular women's sport, both in terms of participation and public interest in New Zealand. As in many netball-playing countries, netball is considered primarily a women's sport, with men's netball largely ancillary to women's competition. The sport maintains a high profile in New Zealand, due in large part to its national team, the Silver Ferns, which with Australia, has remained at the forefront of world netball for several decades. In 2008, netball in New Zealand became a semi-professional sport with the introduction of the trans-Tasman ANZ Championship. The sport is administered by Netball New Zealand, which registered 125,500 players in 2006.

=== Rugby league ===
Unlike Australia, where rugby league is the dominant rugby code, rugby union is the more popular code in New Zealand. The New Zealand domestic league is semi-professional.

The New Zealand national side has competed in the Rugby League World Cup since 1954. They were the previous World Champions, winning the World Cup for the first time on 22 November 2008 at Lang Park, Brisbane. The team also reached the 2013 Rugby League World Cup (hosted by England and Wales) final on Saturday 30 October 2013. They lost to Australia in the final, 34–2. The team's most recent title came in the 2014 Rugby League Four Nations tournament by beating Australia, which brings their Rugby League Four Nations championships total to two.

=== Football ===
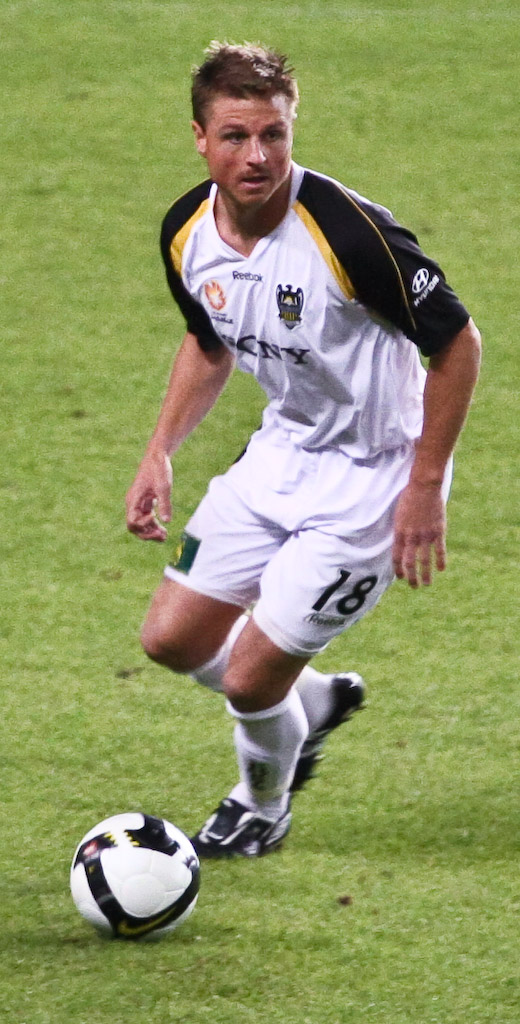
Ben Sigmund, Wellington Phoenix player

Football has always been a significant sport in New Zealand, and was introduced by the first English settlers. It is considered the regional sport of Greater Wellington, which in turn is the only region in New Zealand not to have rugby union as the most popular sport. This is exemplified by Wellington having New Zealand's first professional side, the Wellington Phoenix, which plays in the Australian A-League. Football's greater regional popularity has been due to extensive support among the city's half a million people, especially since inner city clubs were formed immigration from Europe and the Middle East in the postwar period. These clubs were often ethnically based, including Wellington Olympic AFC (Greek), Wellington United (Dutch and Hungarian), and Island Bay United (Italian). The Miramar Rangers have often been considered Wellington's local powerhouse. Several Wellington Phoenix players have gone on to have major success overseas, such as Sarpreet Singh, Roy Krishna, Marco Rojas and Liberato Cacace. Wynton Rufer, considered the country's greatest ever footballer, was born and raised in Wellington.

Nationally, the sport is administered by New Zealand Football, which changed its name from "New Zealand Soccer" in 2007 to move in line with common usage around the world. Use of term "football" to refer to the sport is increasingly favoured by news sources and publications.

The New Zealand national team, nicknamed the "All Whites", has qualified for the FIFA World Cup thrice. At their first appearance in 1982, the All Whites were knocked out in the first round with three losses. Their next appearance in 2010 saw another first-round exit, but with considerably more success on the field; the All Whites earned three draws, including a 1–1 result against defending champion Italy, ending up as the only team that was not beaten in this edition. The country's professional men's football team are, Auckland FC and Wellington Phoenix FC, who play in the A-League which is otherwise an all-Australian competition, and South Island United FC, who play in the OFC Professional League with Auckland FC. The major domestic competitions are the New Zealand National League, which is played between eleven teams from the regional league: Northern League, Central League and Southern League. The other competition is the Chatham Cup which is a knock-out competition played between clubs. Neither the Auckland nor Phoenix first teams can play in the Chatham Cup.

Auckland City FC won the semi-professional OFC Champions League competition in a record fourteen times; 2006, 2008–09, 2010–11, 2011–12, 2012–13, 2013–14, 2014–15, 2016, 2017, 2022, 2023, 2024, 2025 and 2026, and earned the bronze medal at the 2014 FIFA Club World Cup held in Morocco.

Football is especially popular amongst young people. In 2017, football was played by 25,037 secondary school students, making it the fourth-most popular sport behind netball, rugby union and basketball.

New Zealand hosted the 1999 FIFA U-17 World Cup, the inaugural FIFA U-17 Women's World Cup in 2008 and the 2015 FIFA U-20 World Cup and co-hosted the 2023 FIFA Women's World Cup alongside Australia.

=== Basketball ===
The Auckland-based New Zealand Breakers are the only New Zealand-based team in the National Basketball League of Australia. Four players from New Zealand have gone on to play in the NBA: Steven Adams, Aron Baynes, Sean Marks, and Kirk Penney.

On the international stage, the Tall Blacks (New Zealand's national team) came in 4th place at the 2002 FIBA World Championship.

== Other sports ==
=== Athletics (track and field) ===
Athletics is New Zealand's second-most successful Olympic sport with 24 medals, of which 10 have been gold. Arthur Porritt was New Zealand's first Olympic athletic medallist, winning bronze in the 100 metres at the 1924 Summer Olympics. The race was later immortallised in the 1981 film Chariots of Fire, although at Porritt's request his character in the film was renamed "Tom Watson".

The nation in particular has been strong in middle-distance events. New Zealand men have won Olympic gold in the 1500 metres three times: Jack Lovelock in 1936, Peter Snell in 1964 and John Walker in 1976. Snell also won back-to-back gold medals in the 800 metres in 1960 and 1964.

The national governing body is Athletics New Zealand, which formed in 1887 as the New Zealand Amateur Athletics Association and adopted its current name in 1989.

=== Australian rules football (footy) ===
Australian rules football is a growing sport in New Zealand with programs established under the reorganised governing body of AFL New Zealand. Australian rules football was previously much more popular in New Zealand, with a team competing at the 1908 Melbourne Carnival. Participation dropped after World War I. The game was re-established in New Zealand in the 1970s.

Leagues currently exist in Auckland, Canterbury, Waikato, and Wellington. The national team won the Australian Football International Cup in 2005.

New Zealanders who have played in the Australian Football League, the premier Australian rules football competition, include Joe Sellwood, Wayne Schwass, Thomas O'Halloran, Danny Dickfos, Trent Croad and Karmichael Hunt.

=== Baseball ===
The Auckland Tuatara of the Australian Baseball League are currently the only professional baseball team playing in New Zealand. The Tuatara began their inaugural season during the 2018–19 Australian Baseball League season, and originally played their home games at McLeod Park in Te Atatū South.

The New Zealand national baseball team are known as The Diamondblacks.

=== Boxing ===
Amateur boxing was earlier a popular sport in New Zealand, but during the 1950s there was a move to stop schools promoting boxing championships and the sport is now only of minority interest.

Professional boxing in New Zealand has produced Joseph Parker, Geovana Peres, Daniella Smith, Maselino Masoe, Bob Fitzsimmons, Torpedo Billy Murphy, Cherneka Johnson, and Floyd Masson all World Champions. Herbert Slade, David Tua, Kali Meehan, Lani Daniels, Michelle Preston and Tom Heeney were all contenders for a World Championship.

=== Canoeing ===
New Zealand enjoyed success in canoeing and kayaking at the Summer Olympics in the 1980s with sprint kayakers such as Ian Ferguson and Paul MacDonald, winning four gold medals at the 1984 Los Angeles games, and gold, silver and bronze at the 1988 Seoul games. The sport had a lower profile in the 1990s and 2000s, with the single Olympic medal success in the time being Ben Fouhy's silver medal at the 2004 Athens games. In the early 2010s, canoeing and kayaking returned to international success with sprint kayaker Lisa Carrington winning multiple gold medals at the World Championships and Olympic Games.

=== Curling ===
Curling is a minor sport in New Zealand. It is most popular in the area around central Otago, although curling clubs exist throughout the country. The Baxter Cup is believed to be the oldest trophy in New Zealand sport that is still in competition, having first been competed for in 1884 among members of the Dunedin Curling Club and now organised by the Naseby Curling Club. Bonspiels are also held, typically at Oturehua's Idaburn Dam, when weather is cold enough to form sufficient outdoor ice, most recently in 2015.

=== Cycling ===
New Zealand has produced a number of notable cyclists, across a variety of disciplines including track cycling, road cycling, mountain biking, Downhill and BMX. New Zealand won two cycling medals at the 2008 Beijing Olympics – Hayden Roulston took silver in the Men's 4000 m Individual Pursuit, while the men's team pursuit team took bronze. At the 2017 UCI Track Cycling World Championships, the New Zealand team took a total of five medals, equalling the country's record medal tally previously achieved at the 2012 and 2014 Worlds, with Ethan Mitchell, Sam Webster and Eddie Dawkins winning the gold in the men's team sprint for the third time in four years and Mitchell additionally becoming the first New Zealander to medal in the individual sprint. In road racing, George Bennett became the first New Zealander to take an overall win in a UCI WorldTour event when he won the 2017 Tour of California. The sport is governed in New Zealand by Cycling New Zealand.

=== Equestrian ===
Equestrian sportsmen, sportswomen and horses make their mark in the world, with Mark Todd being chosen international "Horseman of the Twentieth Century", and many juniors at Pony Club level. Mark Todd won a gold medal in eventing at the 1984 Olympic Games, and again at the 1988 Games. He won Bronze at the 2012 London games. A Bronze Medal was also won in the Teams Event at the 1988 Games. Further medals were won at the 1992, 1996, and 2000 Games.

=== Gliding ===
New Zealand hosted the 1995 World Gliding Championships at Omarama in North Otago, near the centre of the South Island. In 2002 and 2003, Steve Fossett tried to beat the world gliding altitude record there (see: Gliding New Zealand and external links below).

=== Golf ===
New Zealand's Michael Campbell won the 2005 U.S. Open Golf Championship.

The New Zealand amateur team of Campbell, Phil Tataurangi, Steven Scahill and Grant Moorehead won the Eisenhower Trophy (World Amateur team event) in 1992 in Vancouver.

Sir Bob Charles has won the British Open and a number of other titles.

Lydia Ko, born in Seoul but raised from infancy in New Zealand, was #1 in the women's World Amateur Golf Ranking, and won two events on the US-based LPGA Tour before turning professional in 2013. She has since won seven more LPGA events, and for a time was #1 in the Women's World Golf Rankings for professionals. The first of Ko's two stints as #1 in the professional rankings began in February 2015, before her 18th birthday. Later in 2015, Ko won her first major championship, the Evian Championship.

Tournaments and competitions include New Zealand Open, New Zealand Women's Open, New Zealand Amateur and New Zealand PGA Championship.

=== Hockey ===
In New Zealand, like most other Commonwealth nations, "hockey" without an identifier refers to field hockey, as opposed to ice hockey and other kinds of hockey. The New Zealand Hockey Federation (also known as Hockey New Zealand) administers the sport in New Zealand, and had 48,174 registered players in the 2013 winter, of which 52.8 percent were female and 47.2 percent were male.

The New Zealand men's national team and women's national team are both known as the "Black Sticks". The best result attained thus far by the men was a gold medal at the 1976 Summer Olympics in Montreal. The best placing by the women thus far has been a 4th placing at both the 1986 Women's Hockey World Cup and the 2012 Summer Olympics. In the Commonwealth Games they have won a silver medal at the 2010 Commonwealth Games, bronze at the 2014 Commonwealth Games, and gold at the 2018 Commonwealth Games. As of 23 December 2015, the men's team is ranked 8th and the women's team is ranked 4th in the world by the International Hockey Federation (FIH).

=== Ice hockey ===
Ice hockey has been played in New Zealand since 1937, but is a fairly small sport and has currently around 1600 active players.

The national governing body is New Zealand Ice Hockey Federation which is made up of 3 Regional Associations. Since 2005 the NZIHF organises the New Zealand Ice Hockey League that currently consists of five teams, two teams from Auckland, one from Dunedin, one from Queenstown and one from Christchurch.

New Zealand's men's national ice hockey team is called the Ice Blacks and the women's the Ice Ferns.

=== Indoor bowls ===
New Zealand Indoor Bowls was introduced in 1908. Membership peaked in 1963 with 73,100 affiliated members, today it has an estimated 20,000 members currently affiliated.

=== Kickboxing ===
Kickboxing is a growing sport in New Zealand. New Zealand have had multiple world champions including Ray Sefo, Mark Hunt, Israel Adesanya, Michelle Preston.

=== Kī-o-rahi ===
Kī-o-rahi is a traditional Māori ball sport played in New Zealand with a small round ball called a ki. It is a fast-paced sport incorporating skills similar to Australian Rules, rugby union, netball and touch.

=== Motorsport ===
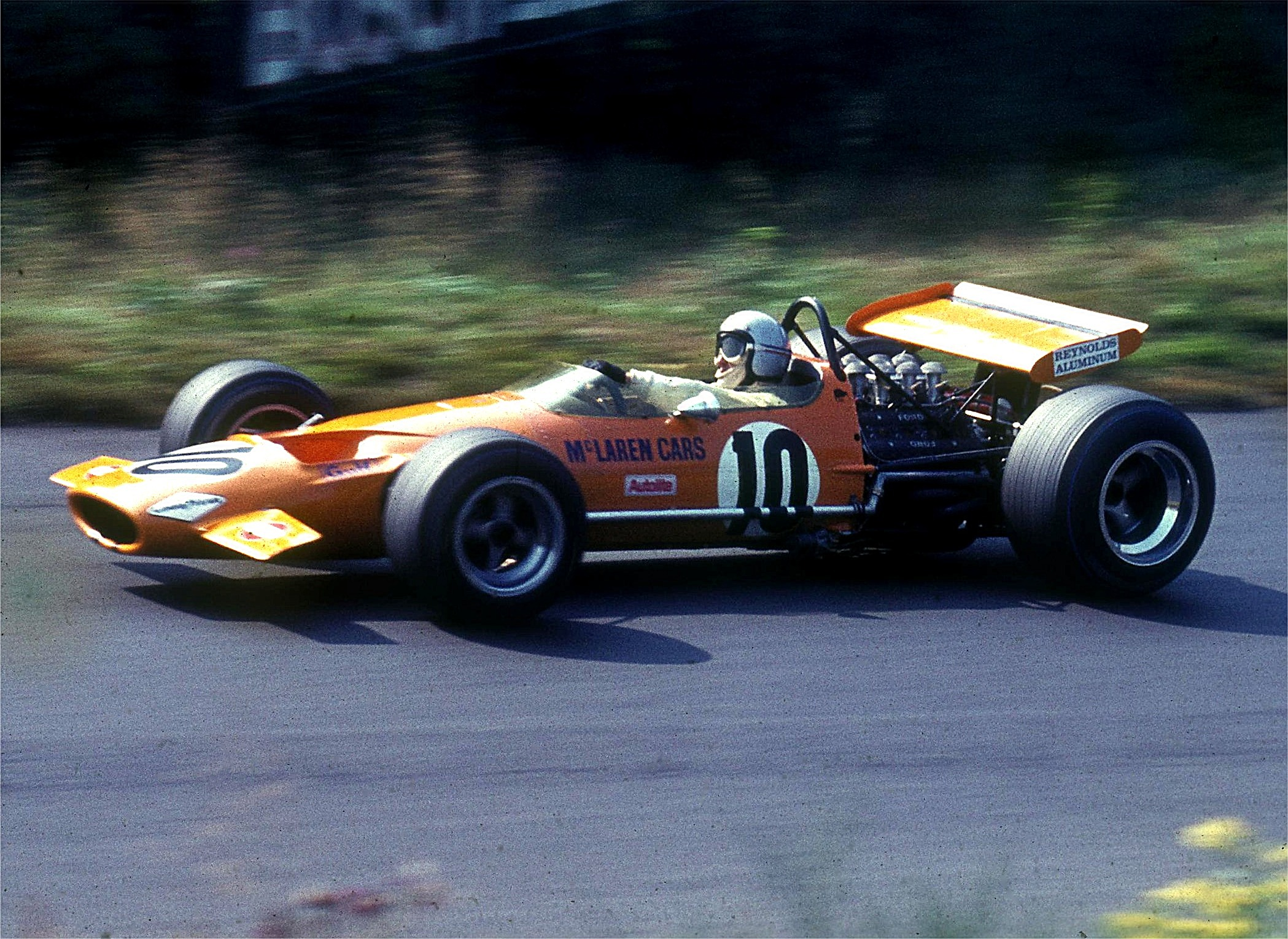
Bruce McLaren driving his McLaren M7A Formula One car

Despite New Zealand not having a major car industry since the 1990s, it is successful at motorsport. There are many levels of competitive motors sport series in New Zealand, which are most simply broken down into watersports (hydro-planing, jetski racing and thundercat racing), automobile racing (Club and national level circuit racing and rallying, with some international events, as well as speedway) and finally motorcycle racing (street, circuit and dirt/motocross).

To date, New Zealand has seen one Formula One World Champion, Denny Hulme, in 1967. Six other New Zealanders have raced at Grand Prix level: Bruce McLaren (four wins), Chris Amon, Howden Ganley, Mike Thackwell, Brendon Hartley and Liam Lawson. Bruce McLaren founded the McLaren racing team, which was named after him.

In addition to their Formula One careers, Chris Amon and Bruce McLaren won the 1966 24 Hours of Le Mans sports-car race. Earl Bamber won the 2015 24 Hours of Le Mans, and won again in 2017 with fellow kiwi Brendon Hartley. Bruce McLaren and Denny Hulme won four Can-Am sports-car racing championships, from 1967 to 1970. Scott Dixon won the Indianapolis 500 in 2008, and the IndyCar Series championship in 2003, 2008, 2013, 2015, 2018 and 2020. Dixon has won 53 races in his IndyCar career, the second most after American driver A. J. Foyt.

New Zealand has drivers currently competing on a high level on the world stage: Scott McLaughlin, Shane van Gisbergen and Fabian Coulthard are among several New Zealand drivers who have contested the Australian-based Supercars Championship, which holds a round in New Zealand each year, at the Pukekohe circuit. Greg Murphy has won the pinnacle race of the Supercar season, the Bathurst 1000, four times. Brendon Hartley won the FIA World Endurance Championship in 2015. Two New Zealanders currently compete in the American IndyCar Series: Scott McLaughlin for Team Penske, and Scott Dixon for Chip Ganassi Racing. One New Zealander currently competes in Formula One: Liam Lawson, who is driving for Racing Bulls in the 2025 Formula One World Championship.

A1 Team New Zealand was a front-runner since the series inception. Jonny Reid won seven races for the team helping it twice claim second place in the Championship, 2006–07 & 2007–08. On 20 January 2008, Taupo Motorsport Park hosted the fifth race in the 2007–08 A1 Grand Prix season.

Rallying is a popular sport in New Zealand, and has previously hosted rounds of the World Rally Championship (the last time being in 2012) and hosts the Asia-Pacific Rally Championship each year. A competitive national championship is run each year, and some drivers also take part in the Australian Rally Championship, most notably the late Possum Bourne, who was a seven-times Australian Rally Champion. Hayden Paddon is New Zealand's top rally driver, formerly competing in the World Rally Championship for Hyundai. New Zealand also has its own rally championship, with the New Zealand Rally Championship going Paddon's way seven times.

Ivan Mauger, born in Christchurch on 4 October 1939, won a record 6 motorcycle speedway World Championships in 1968, 1969, 1970, 1972, 1977 and 1979. He also finished on the podium of the World Final in 1967 (3rd), 1971 (2nd), 1973 (2nd) and 1974 (2nd). Mauger also won the Speedway World Team Cup riding for Great Britain in 1968, 1971 and 1972, while winning the title for a fourth time with the New Zealand team in 1979. Mauger was also the Speedway World Pairs Champion in 1969 and 1970 as well as the Long Track World Champion in 1971, 1972 and 1976, a total of 15 World Championships in speedway racing.

Barry Briggs, born in Christchurch on 30 December 1934, is a New Zealand motorcyclist who won four individual Speedway World Championships (1957, 1958, 1964 and 1966) and took part in 87 world championship races. Briggs also won the Speedway World Team cup with Great Britain in 1968 and 1971.

Ronnie Moore became New Zealand's first motorsport World Champion when he won the 1954 Speedway World Championship, backing that up to win a second time in 1959. Moore also won the World Pairs Championship with Ivan Mauger in 1970. Although born in Hobart, Australia in 1933, Moore's parents moved to New Zealand while he was a child.

Since then Graeme Crosby and Aaron Slight have both risen to the top of World Championship motorcycle racing, in 500cc and Superbikes respectively but championships have been elusive. Also John Britten designed a revolutionary motorcycle called the Britten V1000. Shayne King became the first rider from New Zealand to win the 500cc Motocross World Championship in 1996. Stefan Merriman is a four-time winner of the World Enduro Championship for enduro motorcycling.

In 2003 Wade Cunningham become New Zealand's first ever Fédération Internationale de l'Automobile world champion by winning the Karting World Championship.

=== Orienteering ===
Orienteering is a popular sport in New Zealand, that combines cross-country running with land navigation skills across a range of settings. Variations of the sport popular in New Zealand include bicycle orienteering, ski orienteering, and rogaines. Orienteering is a popular sport for youth and juniors, and New Zealand regularly sends competitors to both the World Orienteering Championships and the Junior World Orienteering Championships. Orienteering in New Zealand is organised by the New Zealand Orienteering Federation Matt Ogden won the middle-distance event at the 2012 Junior World Orienteering Championships in Slovakia.

=== Rowing ===
Rowing has been a consistent medal winner at the Olympic Games with the first coming in 1920. New Zealand have won medals at every Olympics between 1968 and 2016, with the exception of 1980.

At the World Rowing Championships of 2005, in Kaizu, Gifu, Japan, New Zealand won four gold medals in four consecutive races – now known in New Zealand sporting culture as the "Magic 45 minutes".

In 2006, Nathan Cohen became the first New Zealander to win a gold medal at the World University Games in any sport, rowing a single scull.

In addition, a number of Rowing World Cup events have been won by New Zealanders. Rowing New Zealand is the governing body.

Lake Karapiro in the Waikato and Lake Ruataniwha in the Mackenzie Basin are the two premier rowing venues in New Zealand. Karapiro hosted the 2010 World Rowing Championships.

=== Sailing ===
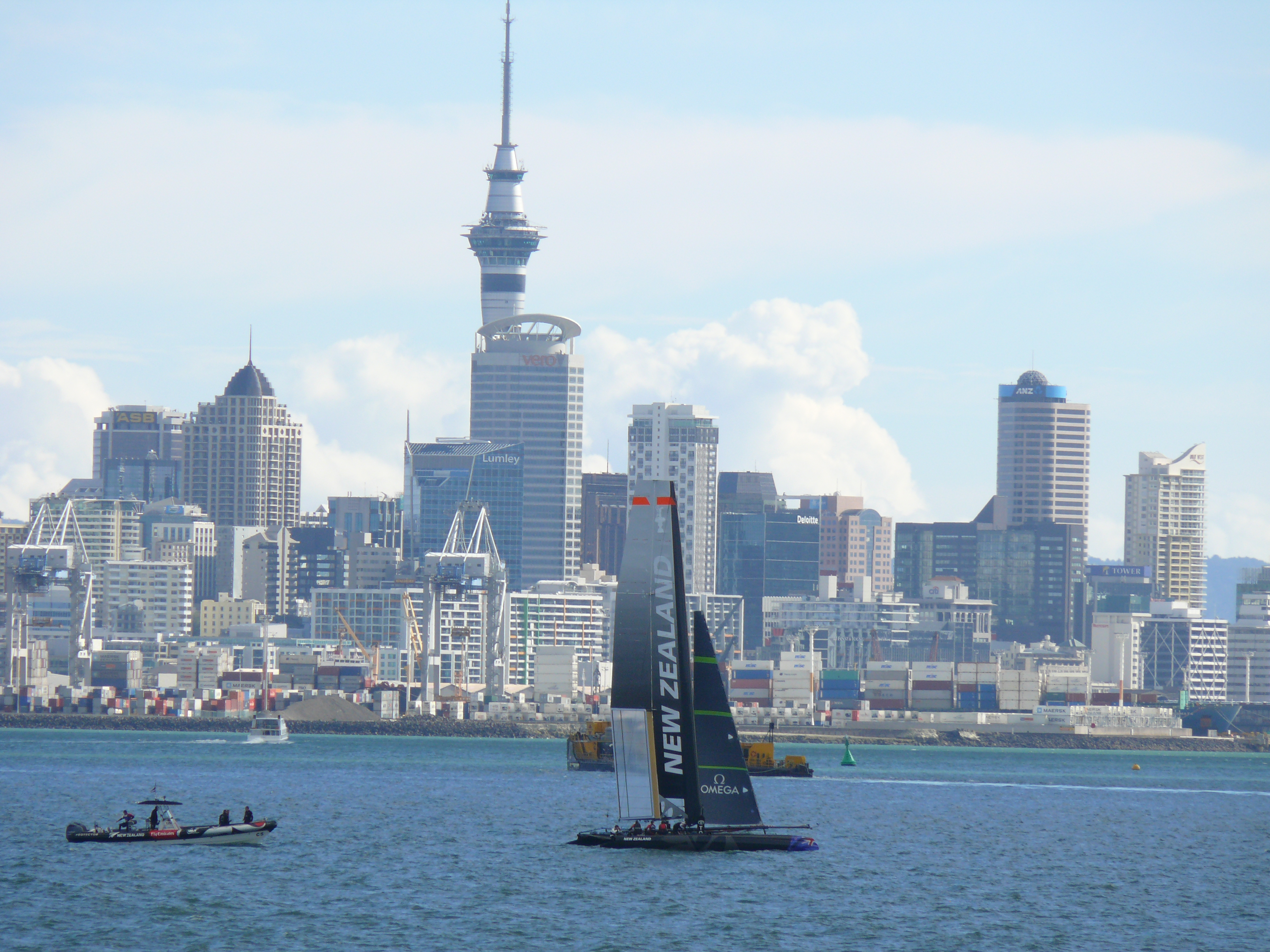
Team New Zealand yacht of the America's Cup World Series

New Zealand sailors have won a large number of international events and offshore races.

==== Olympics ====
Including Olympic Games medals in 1956, 1964, 1984, 1988, 1992, 1996, 2000, 2008, 2012 and 2016. New Zealand holds the current America's Cup sailing title, having won it three times in the challenge's history.

==== Oceanic Races ====
Winning high profile events including the Whitbread Round the World Race.

==== America's Cup ====
Auckland hosted consecutive America's Cup regattas in 2000 and 2003. In 2000, Team New Zealand successfully defended the trophy they won in 1995 in San Diego, but in 2003 they lost to a team headed by Ernesto Bertarelli of Switzerland whose Alinghi was skippered by Russell Coutts, the expatriate Kiwi who helmed the victorious Black Magic in 1995 and New Zealand in 2000 as well as many other Kiwis. Coutts and Brad Butterworth, along with several other Team New Zealand members, defected to Bertarelli's Alinghi team, taking with them a wealth of experience that allowed the new team to win the America's Cup on the first challenge. Coutts was later dismissed from the Alinghi team; he fought a court battle with Bertarelli to allow him to sail in the 2007 America's Cup contest in Spain, but reached a settlement that kept him out of that contest. The 2021 America's Cup was held in Auckland's Waitematā Harbour after New Zealand won the 2017 America's Cup. Emirates Team New Zealand took out 1st place against Luna Rossa of Italy.

=== Surf lifesaving (surf sports) ===
In New Zealand, surf lifesaving sport encompasses a number of different disciplines, including surf swimming, board paddling, surf ski, beach flags, beach sprint, Ironman with competitors starting from the age of 7.

=== Winter sports ===
New Zealand has several areas for skiing and snowboarding, on both islands. Whakapapa and Turoa are the only commercial resorts on the North Island; Queenstown, Wānaka and Christchurch are the top locations in the South Island to access the mountains. In addition to the commercial ski resorts, New Zealand has many non-profit club fields across both the North and South Islands, particularly in the region of the Southern Alps close to Christchurch such as Craigieburn Valley, Broken River and Temple Basin. In the North Island, there are club field skiing options on Mount Taranaki at the Manganui area and also on the Eastern aspect of Mount Ruapehu at Tukino.

International snowboarders from New Zealand include Zoi Sadowski-Synnott, who has won a total of five Olympic medals across the 2018, 2022 and 2026 Winter Olympics, as well as Mitch Brown and his sister Kendall Brown, who competed in the 2006 and 2010 Winter Olympics respectively. Notable skiers include Olympic medallists Nico Porteous, Luca Harrington and Annelise Coberger, as well as Olympians Claudia Riegler and Alice Robinson.

=== Softball ===
New Zealand's men's softball team, nicknamed the "Black Sox", have been successful on the international stage.

The New Zealand women's national softball team are nicknamed the White Sox. They won the World Championships in 1982.

=== Squash ===
Squash has been played competitively in New Zealand since 1932. In 2010, there were 220 clubs affiliated with the national organisation, Squash New Zealand. Competitions are played at club, regional and national level.

Dame Susan Devoy won the World Open Championship a record four times, in 1985, 1987, 1990, and 1992. She also won seven consecutive British Open titles from 1984 to 1990, and an eighth in 1992.

At Squash in the 2010 Commonwealth Games, Joelle King and Jaclyn Hawkes won gold in the women's doubles. King and Martin Knight won silver in the mixed doubles.

New Zealand hosted the Women's World Team Championships in 2010. They were held at International Pacific College in Palmerston North.

In Squash at the 2018 Commonwealth Games, Joelle King won gold in the women's singles and Paul Coll took silver in the men's singles. King won gold again with Amanda Landers-Murphy in women's doubles. King and Coll won bronze in the mixed doubles.

=== Surfing and surfsport ===
Surfing in New Zealand has a history dating back as far as 1963, when the first national championships were held at Mount Maunganui and won by Peter Way. Surfing has since become more popular with many New Zealanders competing on the international scene. In 1976, New Zealand hosted the Amco/Radio Hauraki Pro at North Piha which became the first event of the very first year of the World Professional Surfing Tour. The event was won by Michael Peterson. In 1987, Iain Buchanan would go on to compete on the world tour finishing 34th overall, the highest placing ever for a New Zealand surfer. New Zealand's top surfer Maz Quinn at a young age won the Billabong Pro-Junior Series in Australia in 1996, then competed in the World Pro Junior final in France coming second overall to Taj Burrow. Maz Quinn placed 7th on the ASP World Qualifying Series (WQS) in 2001 to qualify for the World Championship Tour (WCT) – the first Kiwi to do so. Woman's surfing has also come far in recent years with New Zealand surfer Paige Hareb currently sitting in 8th position on the ASP World Tour of Surfing.

=== Tennis ===
Tennis was introduced to New Zealand in the 1870s, soon after the modern form of the game was invented in England.

The first New Zealand Tennis Championships were played at Farndon in Hawkes Bay in 1886.

Māori participation in tennis began soon after. Sir Maui Pomare, the first Māori to qualify as a doctor, won the USA Inter-Varsity Tennis Championships in 1899 while he was studying there. This began a legacy of Māori participation in tennis, with players emerging over the years, most recently professional players like Kelly Evernden, Rewa Hudson and Leanne Baker. But perhaps the doyenne of Māori tennis was Ruia Morrison, who played in international competitions, and at Wimbledon, in the early days of the professional era.

New Zealand and Australia, combined as Australasia, were founding members of the International Tennis Federation (ITF) in 1913.

New Zealander Tony Wilding was the World No. 1 player in 1913. He was Wimbledon Champion in 1910, 1911, 1912 and 1913. He was a pivotal figure in helping Australasia win the Davis Cup in 1907, hold it in 1908 and 1909, and to win it again in 1914. He was killed in action during World War I on 9 May 1915 in the Battle of Aubers Ridge, northern France.

New Zealand has competed in the Fed Cup since 1965, when they played Argentina (won 2–1) and Australia (lost 0–3). At a Fed Cup regional tournament held in Christchurch in 2007, New Zealand played Jordan (won 3–0), India (lost 1–2), Chinese Taipei (lost 1–2), Kazakhstan (won 3–0), and Hong Kong (won 2–1).

New Zealand's representatives at the Olympic Games have been: 1912, Stockholm – Tony Wilding (Australasia); 1988, Seoul – Belinda Cordwell and Kelly Evernden (singles) and Bruce Devlin with Kelly Evernden (men's doubles); 1996, Atlanta – Brett Steven; 2008, Beijing – Marina Erakovic.

The Heineken Open is part of the ATP International Series played in Auckland each year, just before the Australian Open.

=== Triathlon ===
Hamish Carter of New Zealand won gold at the 2004 Athens Olympics and bronze at the 2002 Commonwealth Games in Manchester, and was rated world number one for several years. Other successful triathletes from New Zealand include Bevan Docherty, who won the ITU world championship, and a silver in Athens (both in 2004). He has also gained a bronze medal in Beijing 2008, and a silver medal in the Commonwealth Games (Melbourne in 2006).

On the women's side, Samantha Warriner was ranked number 1 in the world. She won silver at the Commonwealth Games in Melbourne in 2006, and Andrea Hewitt took bronze at the same event.

=== Thoroughbred horse running ===
The various Cup days in the major cities attract crowds, the biggest ones being Auckland Cup week and the Wellington Cup festival. Phar Lap and many Melbourne Cup winners were bred in New Zealand.

=== Underwater hockey ===
New Zealand is the most successful country at the Underwater Hockey World Championships with 28 gold medals across the Elite Men's, Elite Women's, under-24 Men's, under-24 Women's, under-19 Men's and under-19 Women's grades. New Zealand is the only country in the world with an underwater hockey schools league, which has been going for more than 40 years.

=== Volleyball ===
The volleyball national governing body is Volleyball New Zealand which is made up of 14 Regional Associations. Within each Association there are clubs and/or representative teams. The main events on the calendar each year are the National Secondary Schools Championships and the National Club Championships.

The New Zealand women's national volleyball team won the gold medal on several occasions.

== International competitions ==
=== Olympic Games ===
New Zealanders first competed at the Summer Olympic Games in 1908, with Australia as a combined Australasia team. The New Zealand Olympic Committee was formed in 1911 and was recognised by the IOC in 1919. New Zealand first competed as an independent nation in 1920 and has attended every games since with the exception of the 1980 Moscow games, which New Zealand boycotted (four New Zealand athletes did compete at the 1980 games though under the NZOC flag). The nation first attended the Winter Olympic Games in 1952, and has competed at all but two (1956 and 1964) Winter Olympic Games since.

After the 2018 Winter Olympics, New Zealand as a nation has won 120 medals: 46 gold, 28 silver, and 46 bronze. All but three of those medals were won at the Summer Olympic Games. In addition, three medals, one gold and two bronze, were won by New Zealanders in 1908 and 1912 as part of Australasia. New Zealand ranks 34th on the all-time Olympic Games medal table by total medals, and 29th when weighted by medal type. The most successful sports of New Zealand have been rowing (24 medals, including 11 gold) and athletics (24 medals, including 10 gold).

Middle-distance runner Peter Snell won three gold medals and broke several world records during the 1960s.

=== Commonwealth Games ===
The country has hosted three editions of the games: the 1950 British Empire Games and the 1990 Commonwealth Games in Auckland, and the 1974 British Commonwealth Games in Christchurch.

== New Zealand national teams ==
=== National team colours ===
New Zealand's national sporting colours are black and white (or silver). The silver fern is a national emblem worn by New Zealanders representing their country in sport.

=== National team names ===
The national men's rugby union team is known as the "All Blacks". The national women's netball team is known as the "Silver Ferns". Historically, rugby and netball dominated team sport in New Zealand, and the national teams of other sports have acquired names which have been formed with reference to these two (see: list below). The women's rugby team is known as the "Black Ferns", rather than the "All Silvers". Some of these names seem to have arisen as genuine nicknames (e.g. "Tall Blacks", "Wheel Blacks"), and some are neologisms developed as marketing devices (e.g. Black Sticks [hockey], Black Caps [cricket]). New Zealand Badminton temporarily named their teams "Black Cocks". The men's national soccer team is called the "All Whites", as they play in an all-white strip. At the time the national soccer team was formed, an all-black strip would not have been allowed.

Two notable exceptions to the "Black/Ferns" naming scheme are the "Kiwis" (men's Rugby League) and "SWANZ" (the name formerly used for women's soccer).

Sport	Men's	Women's
Australian rules football	Falcons	n/a
Basketball	Tall Blacks	Tall Ferns
Beach volleyball	Sand Blacks	Beach Ferns
Cricket	Black Caps	White Ferns
Gridiron	Steel Blacks	n/a
Football	All Whites	Football Ferns (Note: formerly SWANZ)
Hockey	Black Sticks Men	Black Sticks Women
Lawn bowls	Black Jacks	
Indoor bowls	Mat Blacks	
Ice hockey	Ice Blacks	Ice Fernz
Netball	n/a	Silver Ferns
Rugby league	Kiwis	Kiwi Ferns
Rugby union	All Blacks	Black Ferns
Wheelchair rugby	Wheel Blacks	
Softball	Black Sox	White Sox
Surf lifesaving	Black Fins	
