= New Zealand Volleyball League =

National competition in New Zealand

New Zealand Club Championships
- Current season, competition or edition: 2025 New Zealand Club Championships
- Sport: Volleyball
- Founded: 1968
- First season: 1968
- Administrator: VNZ
- No. of teams: 16 (2025)
- Country: New Zealand
- Continent: Oceania
- Most titles: Sparta (16)
- Level on pyramid: Semi-Pro
- International cup: AVC Club Volleyball Championship
- Website: http://www.volleyballnz.org.nz/

The New Zealand Volleyball Club Championships is the major national volleyball competition for men in New Zealand, established in 1968. It is organized by New Zealand Volleyball Federation (VNZ).

== History ==
The 2025 Club Championships consisted of 16 teams in division 1: Habour Raiders, Shirley Silverbacks, East Coast Old Boys, Pioneer Panthers, Auckland USO, Titans, Tauranga Tigers, Shirley Greybacks, Waitakere Rebels, Habour Dragons, Playaz, Capital Wolves, Hamilton Huskies, Measina, Tahuanui Sharks, Western Bay of Plenty Phoenix. Tauranga Tigers defeated East Coast Old Boys 3:0 in the bronze medal match while Shirley Silverbacks defeated Habour Raiders 3:1 in the National Championship. Silverbacks Seth Grant was awarded with the tournament MVP.

== Winners list ==
- 1968 : Sparta
- 1969 : Sparta
- 1970 : Sparta
- 1971 : Wellington Eagles
- 1972 : Sparta
- 1973 : Sparta
- 1974 : Sparta
- 1975 : Sparta
- 1976 : Rongotai Old Boys College
- 1977 : Sparta
- 1978 : Rongotai Old Boys College
- 1979 : Rongotai Old Boys College
- 1980 : Sparta
- 1981 : Sparta
- 1982 : Canterbury University
- 1983 : Northcote
- 1984 : Canterbury University
- 1985 : Sparta
- 1986 : Sparta
- 1987 : Pioneer
- 1988 : Pioneer
- 1989 : Pioneer
- 1990 : Sparta
- 1991 : Sparta
- 1992 : North Harbor
- 1993 : Shirley
- 1994 : Scorpions
- 1995 : Shirley
- 1996 : Shirley
- 1997 : North Harbor
- 1998 : North Harbor
- 1999 : North Harbor
- 2000 : Shirley
- 2001 : South Auckland
- 2002 : South Auckland
- 2003 : Tauranga
- 2004 : South Auckland
- 2005 : Shirley
- 2006 : North Harbor
- 2007 : South Auckland
- 2008 : North Harbor Raiders
- 2009 : Shirley
- 2010 : Sparta
- 2011 : Sparta
- 2012 : Nelson Pines
- 2013 : Sullis Pines
- 2014 : Richmond Mall Pines
- 2015 : Richmond Mall Pines
- 2016 : Mauao Warriors
- 2017 : Harbor Raiders Blizzard
- 2018 : Harbor Raiders
- 2019 : Shirley Silverbacks
- 2020 : Cancelled - Covid
- 2021 : Cancelled - Covid
- 2022 : Nelson Pines
- 2023 : Habour Raiders
- 2024 : Habour Raiders
- 2025 : Shirley Silverbacks
