= Bowls New Zealand =

Lawn bowls governing body

- Sport: Bowls
- Jurisdiction: New Zealand
- Founded: 1913
- Affiliation: World Bowls

Official website
- bowlsnewzealand.co.nz
- (New Zealand)

Bowls New Zealand is the governing body for the sport of bowls in New Zealand. The organisation is responsible for the promotion and development of lawn bowls in New Zealand, and is affiliated with the world governing body World Bowls.

== History ==
The first bowling green was constructed in Auckland by a group of Scotsmen during 1861. George Turnbull introduced the sport to the South Island later that decade and the Dunedin BC was formed in 1871. In 1886, the North and South Islands came together to form the original New Zealand Bowling Association (NZBA). Further Associations were created, one called the Northern Bowling Association (1890) and another in Auckland (1895), which effectively made the NZBA redundant. However, in 1913 the Associations came together again to form the Dominion of New Zealand Association. In 1931, the word Dominion was dropped and the NZBA continued until the name was modernised to Bowls New Zealand in 1996.

== See also ==
- New Zealand Indoor Bowls
- New Zealand National Bowls Championships
