= Baseball New Zealand =

New Zealand governing body for baseball

- Sport: Baseball
- Jurisdiction: Baseball in New Zealand
- Abbreviation: Baseball NZ
- Founded: 1989
- Affiliation: World Baseball Softball Confederation
- Headquarters: Auckland
- Chairman: Glenn Campbell
- CEO: Michael Redman
- Coach: Dan Tan

Official website
- www.baseballnewzealand.co.nz
- (New Zealand)

Baseball New Zealand, formerly known as the New Zealand Baseball Federation, is the governing body of the sport of baseball in New Zealand. Baseball New Zealand is composed of a number of regional associations and local clubs.

== Annual events ==
=== National Championships ===
National Championships are held annually across Masters, Premier, 16U, and 14U age grades between February and April.

== Organisation ==
=== Board of Directors ===
The Baseball New Zealand Board consists of nine members, four of whom are deemed independent members and who are appointed by the Board. The current Chair is Glenn Campbell.

=== Staff ===
The Baseball New Zealand Team is led by CEO, Michael Redman.

=== Annual General Meeting ===
Baseball NZ must hold an Annual General Meeting of the members once in each calendar year on a date to be fixed by the Board and no later than 15 months after the previous Annual General Meeting.

== Players of note ==
New Zealand has produced a number of accomplished baseballers—most notably Travis Wilson and Scott Campbell.

=== Current professional players from New Zealand ===
RHP Kyle Glogoski signed with the Philadelphia Phillies in 2018 and reached the AAA level in 2021. He reportedly signed for $150,000.

RHP Ben Thompson was drafted by the Atlanta Braves in the 28th round of the 2019 MLB June Amateur Draft out of Chandler-Gilbert Community College in Arizona. He passed up a scholarship offer at Tulane University to sign with the Braves.

In June 2021, RHP Elliot Johnstone signed with the New York Mets. In December 2021, 3B/C Clayton Campbell signed with the Detroit Tigers. He reportedly signed for $125,000.

In January 2022, SS Jason Matthews signed with the Chicago White Sox following a stellar college career at the University of South Carolina Upstate. That same month, left-handed hitting middle infielder Nikau Pouaka-Grego signed with the Philadelphia Phillies. The Phillies paid him a signing bonus of $250,000.

=== Former professional players from New Zealand or of Kiwi heritage ===
Mark Marino, a Māori born in Auckland, was the first player born in New Zealand to play for a Major League organisation, when he signed with the California Angels as a free agent in 1985. He played parts of four seasons in the Angels organisation, topping out at the Single A level when he pitched for the Angels affiliate in Palm Springs. Marino is the CEO of Baseball New South Wales.

Andy Skeels was the first player born in New Zealand (b. Paraparaumu) to be selected in the Major League Baseball amateur draft, when he was drafted by the San Diego Padres in the 7th Round of the 1987 draft. He was traded to the New York Yankees before the 1990 season and hit .270 that year for the AA Albany-Colonie Yankees. He reached AAA with the Yankees in 1991. Ultimately, he enjoyed a 33-year career as a player, coach, manager, and scout in professional baseball. He managed the Diamondblacks during the 2012 World Baseball Classic Qualifying Tournament. In 2017, he made his Major League coaching debut at Dodger Stadium, when he served as a hitting coach for the San Francisco Giants.

Gus Leger became the first player born and raised in New Zealand to play with an MLB organisation when he was signed by the California Angels in 1993 after being spotted as a softball player for New Zealand. He batted just .177 (15 for 85) over two seasons in the Rookie level Arizona League. Thereafter, he returned to New Zealand, where he played both softball and rugby.

Christchurch native Travis Wilson was signed by the Atlanta Braves in 1997 after being spotted as part of the world champion Black Socks. Wilson amassed over 3,000 ABs during a remarkable eight-year professional career, which included 7 seasons in the Braves organisation and 1 season in the Cincinnati Reds organisation. He was the first player born and raised in New Zealand to reach the AA or AAA level. In 2001, he slashed .325/.344/.455 in AA Greenville of the Southern League before being promoted to AAA. He spent most of the 2001, 2002, and 2003 seasons in AAA. In 2002, he slashed .263/.287/.409 in AAA Richmond, with 13 HRs and 71 RBI. He retired after the 2004 season and returned to New Zealand to continue his softball career in 2005. The 2022 season will be his 11th as Assistant Women's Softball Coach at Florida State University.

Auckland native Scott Campbell was the first player born and raised in New Zealand to be selected in the Major League Baseball amateur draft, when he was drafted out of Gonzaga University by the Toronto Blue Jays in the 10th round of the 2006 draft. He spent that Summer with the short-season A Auburn Doubledays and was named to the New York Pennsylvania (NYP) League Mid-Season All-Star team. He spent 2007 with their High-A club, the Lansing Lugnuts. In 2008, he played in 112 games for the New Hampshire Fisher Cats in Double-A, slashing .302/.398/.427. He finished in the top 10 in both batting average and on-base percentage. In 2008, Campbell played in the Futures All-Star game in Yankee Stadium. He scored a run to help the international team to a 3–0 victory over the USA team. He reached the AAA level in 2009, when he played for the Blue Jays affiliate in Las Vegas. Campbell retired in March 2012 due to a recurring hip injury. However, he came out of retirement to play for the national team (Diamondblacks) in the 2013 and 2017 World Baseball Classic Qualifiers.

Scott Richmond signed with the Toronto Blue Jays in 2007 and, the next year, became the first New Zealand citizen to play at the Major League level, when he pitched for the Toronto Blue Jays on 31 July 2008. Born in Canada to a New Zealand father, Richmond started the 2008 season with Campbell at AA New Hampshire but was promoted to AAA Syracuse on 28 June and then to the Major League club on 28 July 2008. His call-up cost him the opportunity to play for the Canadian national team in the 2008 Olympics. Richmond also spent parts of 2009, 2011, and 2012 pitching in the Major Leagues.

Daniel Lamb-Hunt signed with the Atlanta Braves in 2005 but was released before Spring Training.

Wellington native Beau Te Wera Bishop was signed by the Boston Red Sox in 2011.

Daniel Devonshire was selected by the Toronto Blue Jays in the 37th round of the 2012 draft, out of Colby (KS) Community College, and signed with the Blue Jays at that time.

Wanganui native Pita Rona was signed by the Baltimore Orioles in 2012.

Several Australian-born players with Kiwi heritage have signed professional contracts with Major League organisations. Riki Paewai signed with the Padres in 2005. That same year, Tim Auty signed with the Mariners. Alan Schoenberger signed with the Philadelphia Phillies in 2007. Brothers Boss and Moko Moanaroa signed with the Boston Red Sox in 2008. Aaron Whitefield, whose father had represented New Zealand in softball, signed with the Minnesota Twins in 2015 and reached the Major Leagues in 2020.

A number of American-born players of New Zealand descent have been drafted by Major League organisations, including David Skeels (1991, 39th round by the Cubs); Mark Skeels (1992, 18th round by the Marlins); Lincoln Holdzkom (2001, 7th round by the Marlins; reached AAA in 2007 and 2008); John Holdzkom (2005, 15th round by the Mariners; 2006, 4th round by Mets); Randy Yard (2007, 37th round by the Braves; 2011, 36th round by the Reds); Nick Maronde (2008, 43rd round by the A's; 2011, 3rd round by the Angels); and Max Brown (2015, 37th round by the Diamondbacks). Maronde spent parts of three seasons (2012, 2013, and 2014) pitching in the Major Leagues with the Los Angeles Angels. John Holdzkom spent part of the 2014 season pitching in the Major Leagues with the Pittsburgh Pirates.

Several of the players listed above, as well as numerous other Kiwis or players of Kiwi heritage, have played professionally in the Australian Baseball League, including some who have played for the Auckland Tuatara, which joined the ABL as an expansion team for the 2018–2019 season. For example, Mark Skeels won an ABL championship with the 1992–93 Melbourne Monarchs. and played for Perth during the 1993–94 season. Boss Moanaroa has had a long and successful career in the ABL, including an outstanding 2016–17 campaign, in which he slashed .331/.370/.466 in 31 games for Canberra. Daniel Lamb-Hunt, who has extensive international experience, was the first native Kiwi to play in the ABL when he joined the Brisbane Bandits during the 2010–11 season. During the 2018–19 season, he hit .282 in 35 games for Auckland. Lamb-Hunt is also a legend in the German Bundesliga. John Holdzkom pitched for Canberra during the 2012–13 season, following his performance for the Diamondblacks in the 2012 World Baseball Classic Qualifier. That opportunity proved to be an important stepping stone in Holdzkom's winding journey to the Major Leagues. Connar O'Gorman batted .246 in 40 games for Adelaide during the 2015–16 season. Aaron Whitefield is a two-time MVP of the Australian Baseball League (2017 and 2020). Luke Hansen hit .257 in 26 games for Auckland during 2018–19 season. Andrew Marck hit .319 in 38 games for Auckland during the 2019–20 season. Jimmy Boyce has thrown over 100 innings in the ABL, pitching for Auckland and Canberra from 2018 to 2021. Elliot Johnstone, pitching for the Auckland Tuatara, was named ABL Rookie of the Year following the 2019–20 campaign, during which he recorded a 1.09 ERA and a WHIP of 0.973.

=== College Players ===
Baseball New Zealand tracks Kiwis and players of Kiwi heritage who are playing college baseball in the United States. At least 6 native Kiwis have played college baseball at the NCAA Division I level, including Mark Marino (University of Alabama, 1982; University of South Alabama, 1985); Andy Skeels (University of Arkansas, 1986–87), Scott Campbell (Gonzaga University, 2005–06), Mak Fox (Oregon State University, 2014–15), Jason Matthews (University of South Carolina Upstate, 2019–21), and Connor Gleeson (Gardner-Webb University, 2021–22). Many others have played college baseball at the NCAA Division II and III levels, at NAIA schools, and at the junior college level.

== Affiliated baseball clubs and associations ==
=== Northland ===
Baseball was introduced to the region in 2006

=== Auckland ===
==== Bayside-Westhaven ====
Bayside Westhaven has been going for a number of years and fields teams from peewee (T ball) up through to a seniors team. Home fields are at Crossfield Reserve, Crossfield Road in Glendowie, Auckland

==== Central City ====
The Central City Baseball Club was formed in 2007 and plays out of War Memorial Park in Mt Roskill. The club fields teams in all available levels of baseball ranging from T-Ball to adult recreational and competitive grades.

==== Howick-Pakuranga ====
The Howick-Pakuranga club is located in Pakuranga adjacent to the rugby club at Lloyd Elsmore Park.

==== North Shore City ====
Established in 2010 and based at several grounds around the North Shore.

==== West City ====
West City Baseball Club plays its home games at McLeod Park in Te Atatū South and is part of the Auckland Baseball Association.

In December 2008, West City hosted Masashiro Tanaka, star Olympian Japanese baseball player from the Rakuten Eagles of Japan.

=== Canterbury ===
The Canterbury Baseball Club was founded in 2003 and is located at Avonhead Park, on the western edge of Christchurch. It has 3 clubs that play in its premier competition (Astros, Selwyn Braves and the Redbirds). Each year, teams from Canterbury and Nelson play in the Jim Kaat Invitational (named after MLB Hall of Famer Jim Kaat) in a variety of age groups.

=== Nelson ===
The Nelson Heat Baseball Club was founded in 2016.

The club was scheduled to host the 2020 u13 National Club Championship but was cancelled due to the COVID-19 pandemic.

== Competitions ==
=== Domestic competitions ===
The Auckland Baseball Association runs a competition each summer, with 10U, 12U, 13U, 14U, 16U, 19U, Reserve, Premier, and adult Divisional Level 1, 2, and 3 grades.

Canterbury runs an internal competition, while Northland runs an internal competition for the 14U age group.

=== National Club Championships ===
The first true National Club Championships occurred in January 2006, when four age levels held competition: Senior, Under 19, Under 15 & Under 13. Prior years' tournaments were one-off or friendly competitions or only included teams from Auckland.

==== 2009 National Club Championships ====
West City won their third national title in four years as they downed Howick-Pakuranga 7–2 in the senior final.

Central City won the Under 12s, defeating Howick-Pakuranga 3–0.

The tournament witnessed the longest game in Nationals history – Canterbury defeated HP 6–4 in 16 innings. It was small solace for Canterbury, who were eliminated on tiebreakers as all three senior teams finished 1–1.

The tournament was marred with poor weather, as an entire day's schedule was wiped out by rain, resulting in an abbreviated schedule.

==== 2008 National Club Championships ====
The Howick-Pakuranga seniors defeated West City 4–3 in the final. Both teams finished 3–2, while Canterbury finished 1–3.

Bayside-Westhaven Under 16s defeated Howick-Pakuranga 6–5 in their final. The Bayside-Westhaven Under 13s defeated Central City 3–1 in their final.

==== 2007 National Club Championships ====
The first baseball tournament held outside of Auckland, the 2007 national championships saw nine teams from four clubs compete in Canterbury. In the senior level, West City won the title, defeating Canterbury 12–11. Howick-Pakuranga finished 1–1, but failed to reach the finals on IBAF tiebreakers.

At the under 15 level, Howick-Pakuranga claimed the title over Bayside-Westhaven in extra innings, while Canterbury finished third. At the under 13 level, Bayside-Westhaven swept away Howick-Pakuranga, with Canterbury again finishing third.

==== 2006 National Club Championships ====
The first national championship tournament with teams from outside of Auckland saw all four age levels contested by 10 teams from four different clubs. West City defeated Canterbury 5–4 in 10 innings in the championship game to cap an undefeated tournament. Howick-Pakuranga came in third.

The Howick-Pakuranga under 18s defeated Canterbury two games to one. The Bayside-Westhaven & Howick-Pakuranga under 15s were awarded a co-championship. The Bayside-Westhaven under 13s defeated the Canterbury under 13s in the championship game after all three teams finished 1–1.

=== International competition ===
NZ's first Representative side participated in the 1992 Merit Cup tournament, held in Cocoa Beach, Florida, United States.

==== Olympic qualification ====
New Zealand sent a squad to Australia for the Olympic Qualifying Tournament for the 1996 Olympics, but were beaten by Australia. New Zealand was invited to challenge Australia for the right to compete in the 2008 Olympic qualifying tournament, but pulled out three weeks before the tournament.

==== Australian Provincial Championship ====
A senior team competes in the Australian Provincial Championships most years.

==== IBAF Oceania Qualifiers ====
An Under 15 team competed against Australia and New Caledonia for the right to represent Oceania in the 2007 IBAF 'AA' World Championships to be held in Venezuela later in 2007. New Zealand won all of their games against New Caledonia and lost all of their games against Australia.

In 2011 New Zealand will be hosting the IBAF Oceania Qualifiers, in which Australia and Guam will compete against New Zealand for the right to participate in the 2011 IBAF AA World Cup in Mexico later on in the year. Another addition to the tournament is Curtis Granderson, centre-fielder to the New York Yankees, who will make an appearance to promote Baseball around the minor-code nation.

==== 2013 WBC Qualifiers ====
In 2011, Major League Baseball announced that New Zealand would be among the nations invited to a new qualification round to be held in 2012 for the 2013 World Baseball Classic. Ryan Flynn, Chief Executive of Baseball New Zealand, called the development "the best thing to happen in the history of diamond sports in New Zealand." The Diamondblacks, managed by Andy Skeels, won two games and reached the championship game of the Qualifier, but fell to host Taiwan in the final game. New Zealand's Scott Campbell led all players in the tournament with a .583 batting average (7 for 12 with 2 doubles), while playing an error-free tournament at SS. Teammate Boss Moanaroa hit the tournament's only home run. Seventeen-year-old Mak Fox recorded the win against Thailand, while future Major Leaguer John Holdzkom was credited with the win against the Philippines.

==== 2017 WBC Qualifiers ====
The Diamondblacks, managed by Chris Woodward, beat the Philippines but lost twice to South Africa and were eliminated. Boss Moanaroa led the way in New Zealand's win against the Philippines, going 4 for 5 with two doubles, a home run, and 7 RBI; he added another RBI against South Africa and thereby led the tournament with 8 RBI. His brother Moko led the team with a .500 batting average. Eighteen-year-old Jimmy Boyce was credited with the win against the Philippines. Five of the Diamondblacks on the 28-man roster were teenagers, including 17-year-old Kyle Glogoski, who also pitched against the Philippines.

==== 2021 WBC Qualifiers ====
New Zealand was set to compete in the 2021 World Baseball Classic Qualifiers. The Diamondblacks had named Stephen Mintz as their manager and had selected their roster. But the tournament was cancelled due to the COVID-19 pandemic.

== See also ==
- Baseball in New Zealand
- Baseball awards § World
