= Baseball in New Zealand =

- Country: New Zealand
- Governing body: Baseball New Zealand
- National team(s): Men's national team
- Clubs: 21

In New Zealand, baseball is considered a minority sport, trailing in popularity far behind sports such as rugby union and cricket.

== History ==
=== Early history ===
Albert Spalding's team of All-Stars and the Chicago Club in 1888 is the first known baseball game played in New Zealand and perhaps in the Southern Hemisphere. During that tour, many New Zealand cricket players had small matches between the two touring sides. Baseball did not grow significantly though, since New Zealand had strong cultural loyalties to British sports.

=== Contemporary era ===
Since that time, various local competitions have existed, but it was not until 1989 that the New Zealand Baseball Association was formed, consisting of teams in the Auckland area. Ed Mason and Mike Reilly invited perspective players to register their interest. They then formed the New Zealand Baseball Association, with Ed Mason being President and Mike Rielly taking on the Vice President position. City Blues was the first Club under this umbrella and every year in commemoration of this, there is a "Ed Mason Classic" played. It would be 14 more years before baseball would venture out of Auckland with the creation of the Canterbury Baseball Club in 2003. 2006 saw the Northland Baseball Club and the Manawatu Baseball Club form. By 2018, New Zealand received an expansion team from the Australian Baseball League (ABL) in the Auckland Tuatara based in the city of Auckland. The Auckland Tuatara team folded in 2023, ending professional baseball in New Zealand.

New Zealand sends Little League teams to compete in the Asia Pacific region and also fields AA, AAA and senior national teams. The senior national team plays at the Australian Provincial Championships every year.

== Players ==
See Baseball New Zealand

== See also ==
- Baseball New Zealand
- Baseball awards#World
