= New Zealand Indoor Bowls =

Sport

- Highest governing body: New Zealand Indoor Bowling Federation (NZIBF)
- Nicknames: NZIB
- First played: 1908
- Clubs: 34 districts, 414 clubs

Characteristics
- Contact: NZ Indoor Bowls Federation website
- Mixed-sex: Yes
- Type: Bowling
- Equipment: Bowl and jack

New Zealand indoor bowls (NZIB) is a form of indoor bowls that developed in New Zealand and is governed by the New Zealand Indoor Bowling Federation (NZIBF). It is only played competitively within New Zealand, although there is a regular international trans-Tasman fixture using mixed rules. The sport's popularity in New Zealand peaked in the 1960s, though it remains highly competitive across the country.

== History ==
=== 1908–1948: Inception, early growth and standardisation ===
Indoor bowls was introduced to New Zealand in 1908 by Aucklander John Jenkins. Jenkins had seen the game played at the Franco-British Exhibition on a trip to London and been impressed, and brought a set of bowls with him on his return to New Zealand. Jenkins introduced the sport to other members of the Hope of Auckland Rechabite Tent, where fellow member Brother Skinner had been similarly enthused witnessing the sport in Melbourne in 1910. The first competitive match in New Zealand was played by the Rechabite Tent on 15 March 1912, and in 1915 the Tent formed the Independent Order of Rechabites Indoor Bowling Association, the first such organisation in New Zealand. The sport gained popularity quickly, spreading among other friendly societies in Auckland who set up their own indoor bowling associations, including the Foresters Friendly Society in 1917, the United Ancient Order of Druids in 1918, the Oddfellows in 1924 and the Orange Lodge in 1927.

By 1925, the sport had grown in popularity such that there was demand for consistency among bowls. Early bowls were made of hard woods such as mānuka or pūriri, and were 2¼ or 2½ inches in diameter. In 1925 an English firm named Taylor Rolph began producing four inch lignum vitae bowls in sets of 16 exclusively for the New Zealand market, which gained widespread popularity due to their consistent draw. Though early games had been played on a 12 ft green baize mat, this was deemed unsuitable following the ascendancy of the Taylor Rolph bowls. W. Miller, manager of the Onehunga Woollen Mills, was approached to design a mat suited to the needs of the game, and created a special carpet with a nap imitating outdoor greens which became standard use. The proportions of this mat, 22 ft by 6 ft, remain in use.

Following the standardisation of playing equipment, in the late 1920s and 1930s New Zealand indoor bowls began to spread beyond friendly societies through business houses, returned servicemen's associations, churches, band halls and social clubs. Commercial organisations also adopted the sport as a form of staff recreation. In this period women became involved, as the sport had previously been restricted to men's-only groups such as fraternal lodges. The first district associations also began to form in this period. By 1938 there were about 150 indoor bowling clubs, with an estimated 10,000 indoor bowlers in the Auckland area. The sport spread beyond Auckland across New Zealand, principally through friendly societies. Indoor bowls was popular during the Second World War as a cheap past-time available to all ages and genders, and the Auckland Indoor Bowls Centre was established in 1942. The sport experienced a rapid rise in popularity following the war, precipitating the establishment of a national federation.

=== 1948–present: Federation, peak and waning popularity ===
In light of the sport's rapid national growth, Wellingtonian George Welch began making efforts to establish a national body in 1948, with the assistance of the Physical Welfare Department. On 18 September 1948, Welch convened a meeting in the Wellington Harbour Board Social Club rooms with representatives present from the indoor bowls organisations of Auckland, Hāwera, Whanganui, Palmerston North, the Hutt Valley and Wellington. The New Zealand Indoor Bowls Federation (NZIBF) was formed with Welch as secretary and fellow Wellingtonian Cliff Wearne as president. Canterbury, Hawkes Bay, Horowhenua, Hutt Valley, Palmerston North, Central Taranaki, South Taranaki, Wanganui and Wellington were founding member districts of the federation in 1948, with a total of 1,854 registered members. They were joined by Waikato and Taranaki North in 1949. The large Auckland Association did not join until 1954, which brought the federation to 21 member districts and over 21,000 individual members.

The NZIBF's first actions were to establish standardised rules of play, which were written up as the Laws of the Game to be revised and reissued every five years. Rules in the first edition included a fault for spilling pipe tobacco on the mat, and a requirement for spectators to show neutrality. The NZIBF also standardised the jack to be 2 inches in diameter in 1950. During the 1950s, bowls manufactured by Australian brand Henselite were first used in New Zealand; this brand is now the only one used by New Zealand indoor bowls players.

In June 1950, the first National Championships were held in Wellington, with 120 entries in the singles, 75 teams in the pairs, and 45 in the fours. The competition has been held annually since, being expanded to include a triples competition in 1993. Junior and Master competitions for younger and older players have also been introduced. Despite being an indoor sport, the 1972 national fours final in Invercargill was interrupted by bad weather, as hail was falling through the roof and onto the mat.

Participation in New Zealand indoor bowls increased significantly through the 1940s and 1950s. In 1963, NZIBF reached a peak of 73,100 members affiliated across 35 district associations, covering the entire country. More than 12,000 of these members were from Auckland alone. The National Championships reached peak attendance in 1977, with 3,050 singles entries, 1,700 pairs teams and 835 fours teams. However, memberships in districts such as Southland peaked in the mid 1960s and had begun to decline by 1967, and NZIBF membership had declined to 50,300 by 1984. Participation has seen gradual decline in subsequent decades due to a number of factors, including competition with other sports and activities, the adoption of the seven day working week, and the perception of being a pursuit for older people.

=== Modern game, administration and wider involvement ===
New Zealand Indoor Bowls Federation is currently made up of 34 centres and 414 clubs covering all of New Zealand. The NZIBF is managed by an executive committee made up of nine members, elected by vote. The NZIBF includes five associate members: New Zealand Blind and Visually Impaired Indoor Bowls Federation, Clubs New Zealand, Deaf Indoor Bowls New Zealand, New Zealand Special Olympics Foundation, and New Zealand Catholic Indoor Bowls Federation.

Disabled people have played a prominent role in New Zealand indoor bowls. Deaf, blind and visually impaired, and paraplegic people have contributed significantly to the administration and competition of the sport. Indoor bowls is one of six sports contested in the New Zealand Deaf Games. Stewart 'Sen' Smith, a recipient of the Queen Elizabeth II Coronation Medal, president of the Auckland Deaf Society and founding member of the New Zealand Deaf Society, was a highly influential and successful New Zealand indoor bowls player, winning several deaf and open titles and playing a key role in administration. In 2019 the NZIBF executive resolved to allow artificial bowling devices to be used, and in 2021 the Laws of the Game were revised to reflect this.

The New Zealand Catholic Indoor Bowls Federation was founded in 1955, and holds an annual national tournament. Cardinal Thomas Williams was a patron of the federation.

In 1975, the first international fixture took place between Australia and New Zealand for the Henselite Trophy, played in Auckland using New Zealand indoor bowls rules. From 1975-1979 the trans-Tasman fixture was contested four times, with the venue and ruleset alternating between the two countries. In each case, the trophy was won by the host country whose domestic ruleset was being used. In 1983, the fixture resumed biennially with the introduction of The International Laws of the Game, which compromise between the two countries' rulesets. As of 2024 there have been 25 editions of the fixture, with New Zealand winning the Henselite Trophy 18 times and Australia 5 times, accompanied by two ties. The New Zealand indoor bowls national team are called the Mat Blacks.

== Gameplay ==
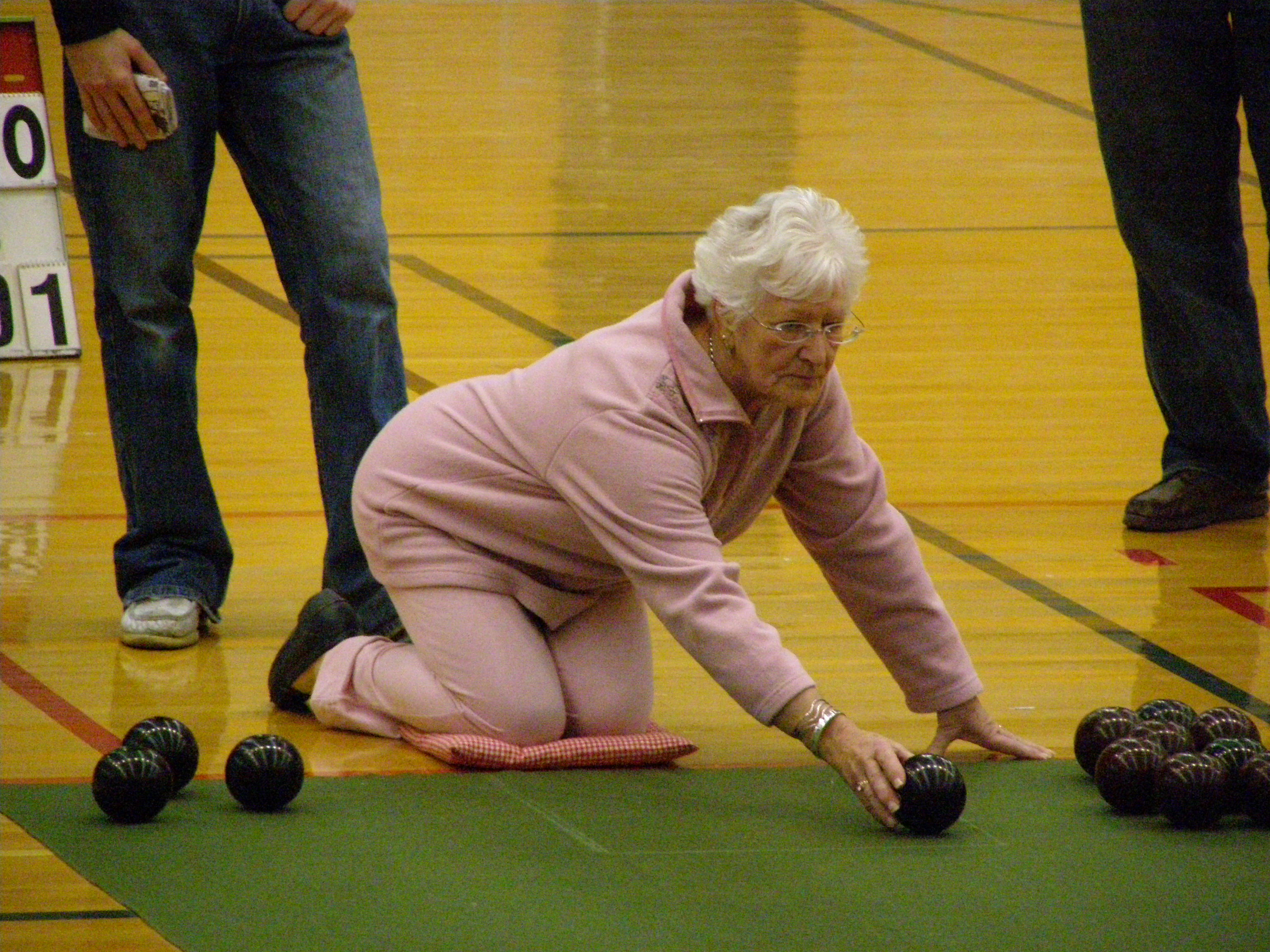
A player kneeling and using the pincer grip. This photo was taken during the semifinal of the fours at the 2007 nationals.

The equipment, technique and gameplay of New Zealand indoor bowls share many similarities with indoor bowls played internationally. The exact requirements for equipment, play and competition are specified in the Laws of the Game.

Three main stances are used by players of NZIB:

- Kneeling on one knee
- Kneeling on two knees
- Crouching

A game is made up of a series of ends. The winner of the game is the team with the most points when all ends are played or when a predetermined time limit is reached. Depending on the rules of play as dictated by the organisers of the competition, if a draw results, the game can be settled with a deciding end or the game can be recorded as a tie.

=== Equipment ===
Three pieces of equipment are required for a game of NZIB, with exact specifications for these prescribed in the Laws of the Game:

- A mat, approximately 6.7 m long and 1.8 m wide.
- A white spherical jack.
- A set of 16 bowls, with eight each in two contrasting colours, with a draw of at least 840 mm over a run of 5.50 m.

== International competition ==
International competition only takes place biennially between New Zealand and Australia on a home and away basis. Each country has different rules and conditions, so to even the playing field the match is played on special mats which are longer and thicker than the ones commonly used in New Zealand, but shorter than those used in Australia. The match is also played under a different set of rules due to the variations between the two countries. Each team comprises the top 7 men and 7 women from each country. They combine to play in men's and women's singles, men's and women's pairs, mixed 8 bowl pairs, mixed 6 bowl pairs, men's and women's triples, men's and women's fours and mixed fours. Games consist of 3 sets of various ends. Each team that wins their set wins the Australasian Medal with the overall scores being combined to decide the winner of the Henselite Trophy. In the event of a tie, the Trophy is retained by the defending champion.

Henselite Trophy winners
| Year | Champion | Host city |
|---|---|---|
| 1975 | New Zealand | Auckland, NZ |
| 1976 | Australia | Newcastle, AUS |
| 1978 | New Zealand | Wellington, NZ |
| 1979 | Australia | Adelaide, AUS |
| 1983 | New Zealand | Christchurch, NZ |
| 1985 | New Zealand | Ballarat, AUS |
| 1987 | New Zealand | Porirua, NZ |
| 1989 | New Zealand | Adelaide, AUS |
| 1991 | Australia | Christchurch, NZ |
| 1993 | New Zealand | Runaway Bay, AUS |
| 1995 | New Zealand | Rotorua, NZ |
| 1997 | New Zealand | Devonport, AUS |
| 1999 | New Zealand | Napier, NZ |
| 2001 | New Zealand | Sydney, AUS |
| 2003 | New Zealand | Balclutha, NZ |
| 2005 | New Zealand | Colac, AUS |
| 2007 | Tie (retained by New Zealand) | Pukekohe, NZ |
| 2009 | Australia | Broken Hill, AUS |
| 2011 | Tie (retained by Australia) | Balclutha, NZ |
| 2013 | New Zealand | Morayfield, AUS |
| 2015 | New Zealand | Tauranga, NZ |
| 2017 | New Zealand | Sydney, AUS |
| 2019 | New Zealand | Invercargill, NZ |
| 2022 | New Zealand | Ballarat, AUS |
| 2024 | Australia | Pukekohe, NZ |

Australia currently holds the Henselite Trophy. The overall record is 18–5 in New Zealand's favour, with two tied fixtures.

== New Zealand national competitions ==
=== Inter-district competitions ===
NZIBF oversees multiple competitions between teams representing its constituent districts. The premier inter-district title is the Welch Trophy, which has been contested since 1952. It was first introduced as a challenge-based system with the defending champion having to accept a certain number of challenges each year. In 1964 the system was revised as the Paterson Trophies were introduced, with one challenge-based Paterson Trophy in each of the North Island and South Island. At the end of the year, the holders of each trophy would compete for the Welch Trophy. The system gradually evolved, with the number of areas competing for a local Paterson Trophy increasing and the format shifting from challenges to round-robin. From 1989–2022, six zonal Paterson Trophy winners would compete for the Welch Trophy each year. Since 2023, districts are placed into divisions based on their previous year's results and the top division competes for the Welch Trophy, with other divisions competing for Paterson Trophies.

Welch Trophy Winners
| Year | Winning Center |
|---|---|
| 1952–1955 | Wellington |
| 1955–1956 | Horowhenua |
| 1956–1958 | Waikato |
| 1958 | Horowhenua |
| 1958 | Ruapehu |
| 1958–1959 | Hutt Valley |
| 1959 | Wellington |
| 1959–1962 | Waikato |
| 1962–1963 | Northland |
| 1963 | Auckland |
| 1964 | Auckland |
| 1965 | Horowhenua |
| 1966 | Bay of Plenty |
| 1967 | Canterbury |
| 1968 | Canterbury |
| 1969 | Bay of Plenty |
| 1970 | Otago |
| 1971 | Waikato |
| 1972 | Canterbury |
| 1973 | Canterbury |
| 1974 | Canterbury |
| 1975 | Auckland |
| 1976 | Canterbury |
| 1977 | Canterbury |
| 1978 | Upper Hutt Valley |
| 1979 | Upper Hutt Valley |
| 1980 | North Taranaki |
| 1981 | Canterbury |
| 1982 | Auckland |
| 1983 | Waikato |
| 1984 | North Taranaki |
| 1985 | Canterbury |
| 1986 | Auckland |
| 1987 | Waikato |
| 1988 | Waikato |
| 1989 | Waikato |
| 1990 | Otago |
| 1991 | Waikato |
| 1992 | Auckland |
| 1993 | Waikato |
| 1994 | Waikato |
| 1995 | Waikato |
| 1996 | Manawatu |
| 1997 | Waikato |
| 1998 | Manawatu |
| 1999 | Otago |
| 2000 | Manawatu |
| 2001 | Otago |
| 2002 | Manawatu |
| 2003 | Otago |
| 2004 | Manawatu |
| 2005 | Upper Hutt Valley |
| 2006 | Waikato |
| 2007 | Auckland |
| 2008 | Canterbury |
| 2009 | Canterbury |
| 2010 | Canterbury |
| 2011 | Canterbury |
| 2012 | North Taranaki |
| 2013 | North Taranaki |
| 2014 | North Wellington |
| 2015 | North Taranaki |
| 2016 | North Taranaki |
| 2017 | Auckland |
| 2018 | Manawatu |
| 2019 | Auckland |
| 2020–2021 | No competition held |
| 2022 | Waikato |
| 2023 | Waikato |
| 2024 | Waikato |

Winners before 1964 held the trophy as long as they could defend it from challengers, whereas winners from 1964 onward were the victor of an annual competition of varying formats. Since 1964 Waikato has been the most successful district, winning the Welch Trophy 14 times, followed closely by Canterbury with 13 victories.

=== NZIB National Championships ===
NZIBF organises the NZIB National Championships each year. Competition takes place in open, junior and masters categories, across singles, pairs, triples and fours events.

National Open Championship Winners
| Year | Singles | | Pairs | | Triples | | Fours | |
| Year | Name | Centre | Name | Centre | Name | Centre | Name | Centre |
|---|---|---|---|---|---|---|---|---|
| 1950 | H Hubbard | Wellington | F G Gooch, J Walsh | Wellington | | | K R Smith, A H Childs, E D Stevens, R G P Caldwell | Wellington |
| 1951 | J McGuiness | Wellington | R E Craig, J M McPadden | Wellington | | | E J D MacDonald, A E Curry, G McDonald, C H G Ward | Wellington |
| 1952 | C E Minifie | Waikato | W Edwards, R Learmonth | Waikato | | | E J D MacDonald, A E Curry, G McDonald, C H G Ward | Wellington |
| 1953 | O Jordan | Taranaki | W Wearne, F Haines | Waikato | | | L J Hills, T Odlum, W Reed, Mrs W Reed | Taranaki |
| 1954 | G McDonald | Hutt Valley | E G F Smith, F F Smith | Canterbury | | | E J D MacDonald, G McDonald, H W Robins, C A Clark | Hutt Valley |
| 1955 | C W Hancock | Manawatu | E Pilgrim, Mrs E Petersen | Horowhenua | | | H T Keys, D G Sinclair, M T Dempsey, A A Smith | Hutt Valley |
| 1956 | J Pirrett Jnr | Auckland | A H Thomas, G F Bain | Wellington | | | S D Dick, E Death, C Claridge, H Waswo | Taranaki |
| 1957 | A H Thomas | Wellington | R Fridd, Mrs S Fridd | Canterbury | | | C E Minifie, F Haines, R Haines, G Labrum | Waikato |
| 1958 | R J A Pinhey | Hutt Valley | L Dunn, Mrs N Buckley | Canterbury | | | A H Thomas, G F Bain, E E Cooper, H R Howard | Wellington |
| 1959 | W Wells | Wellington | R Loader, P Webby | Waikato | | | J Cantwell, W Preston, Mrs A Scott, Mrs J Cantwell | Hawkes Bay |
| 1960 | J W Woods | Wellington | R Bethwaite, E R Trask | Wellington | | | J Ewing, E Reader, D J Keast, K Howan | Wellington |
| 1961 | G A Keith | Mid Canterbury | E G F Smith, M Lunt | Canterbury | | | E Blackmore, M Harvey, E E Boyd, Mrs L Harvey | Southland |
| 1962 | T Burr | Waikato | R Loader, N Hull | Waikato | | | S.E.N. Smith, P Cearns, L Taylor, Mrs K Smith | Auckland |
| 1963 | B McLennan | Waikato | Mrs C J Thompson, C J Thompson | Waikato | | | C King, J King, W Vette, Mrs P King | Waikato |
| 1964 | L Bellis | Greymouth | W Cuttance, D Cook | Canterbury | | | P Nee, D R Fleming, W Trembath, Mrs R Nee | Canterbury |
| 1965 | R McK Bethwaite | Wellington | W Marshall, D Wells | Auckland | | | G Brensell, R Willers, Mrs N Brensell, Mrs R Willers | Horowhenua |
| 1966 | S Johnstone | Southland | A Williamson, R J Watkin | Canterbury | | | S.E.N. Smith, B Pridham, F Bell, Mrs K Smith | Auckland |
| 1967 | J C Michie | Hutt Valley | W Oliver, R Schou | Bay of Plenty | | | L Dunn, Mrs M Serra, Mrs C Walker, Miss B Bowsie | Auckland |
| 1968 | R Cumberland | Waikato | G Oliver, Mrs J Oliver | Waikato | | | M Sullivan, B Guy, Ola Sullivan, R Cumberland | Waikato |
| 1969 | G N Taylor | Canterbury | R Roser, Mrs V Roser | Horowhenua | | | S.E.N. Smith, B Pridham, F Bell, Mrs K Smith | Auckland |
| 1970 | C Taylor | Auckland | E Hills, O McGehan | Auckland | | | K Andrew, B Pinkney, L Conn, Mrs D Pinkney | Waikato |
| 1971 | K Darling | Otago | A Rasmussen, B Wood | Auckland | | | S.E.N. Smith, B Pridham, F Bell, Mrs K Smith | Auckland |
| 1972 | K Boothby | Taranaki | N Le Lievre, J Campion | Southland | | | J McGlory, W Norman, H Williams, G Jobson | Otago |
| 1973 | G Dunlop | Bay of Plenty | J Pringle, G Groves | Auckland | | | A Rasmussen, B Wood, Mrs S Bishop, Mrs M Lehmann | Auckland |
| 1974 | T Wright | Waikato | A Weston, E Hubbert | Auckland | | | J Eccles, R Eccles, B Hamilton, G Johnson | Waikato |
| 1975 | B O Stewart | Auckland | J Hook, Mrs J Hook | Auckland | | | D R Stagg, Mrs J Tucker, R Tucker, K Christensen | Hawkes Bay |
| 1976 | G Barnes | Canterbury | F Sayer, Mrs F Sayer | Manawatu | | | D Schollum, F Hale, A Hutchins, J Campion | Poverty Bay-East Coast |
| 1977 | R Fleming | Auckland | K Mulcahy, Mrs K Mulcahy | Waikato | | | N Gray, C Turnbull, L Pointon, R Fenneman | Bay of Plenty |
| 1978 | R Dockary | North Wellington | C Ireland, D Mace | Waikato | | | G Persico, D Wadsworth, R Buonocore, W Ferguson | Nelson |
| 1979 | R J Frelan | Waikato | P Troy, T Wright | Waikato | | | M Bryant, E Taylor, Mrs S Middlemiss, Mrs V Shaw | Waikato |
| 1980 | R Fleming | Auckland | G Pedersen, K Boothby | Waikato | | | R Fleming, P Bowden, J Street, Mrs D Double | Auckland |
| 1981 | K Coombe | Waikato | G Pedersen, K Boothby | Waikato | | | J Barr, Ivon Pash, Merle Pash, G Pash | North Shore |
| 1982 | B Kinnaird | Manukau | M Berkeley, Mrs P Dunbar | Canterbury | | | R Fleming, T O'Connor, I Wheeler, D Fleming | Manukau |
| 1983 | R Eccles | Waikato | A Hutchins, R Smith | Poverty Bay-East Coast | | | R Just, C Just, Mrs K Just, K Goodgame | Wanganui |
| 1984 | K Coombe | Waikato | K Whitehead, K Torrey | North Shore | | | R Duncan, M Johnston, R Inglis, R Inglis | Golden Bay-Motueka |
| 1985 | W Kane | Southland | K Gash, P Psaila | Auckland | | | D Hewitt, M McGeady, Mrs C Hewitt, Mrs M McGeady | Upper Hutt Valley |
| 1986 | R Eccles | Bay of Plenty | K Waghorn, J Smyth | Manawatu | | | N Warnes, P Hoult, R Verdonk, M Gibbs | Nelson |
| 1987 | J Taare | Bay of Plenty | D Gilshnan, J Meyer | Manawatu | | | J Bullen, P Crotty, M Hewitt, R Leitch | Upper Hutt Valley |
| 1988 | I Wheeler | Auckland | M Bryant, J Hearn | Waikato | | | L Bellis, G Lawson, A Curtain, Mrs J Bellis | Canterbury |
| 1989 | G Lawson | Canterbury | C Taylor, P Psaila | Auckland | | | P Bowden, O Griffiths, B Kinnaird, S.E.N. Smith | Manukau |
| 1990 | D Quirke | North Wellington | K Whitehead, K Torrey | North Shore | | | M Rowlands, J Priest, Mrs G Rowlands, S Marsters | North Taranaki |
| 1991 | M James | Waikato | W Baker, D Baker | Waikato | | | K Anngow, M Berkeley, D Elmey, Mrs S Elmey | Canterbury |
| 1992 | B Rainsford | Auckland | K Childs, R Wyatt | Auckland | | | B Kinnaird, G Baxter, R Baxter, K Wright | Auckland |
| 1993 | G Lawson | Roskill and Districts | D Gilshnan, S Gilshnan | Manawatu | K Whitehead, K Torrey, B Torrey | North Shore | P Berkeley, M Berkeley, T King, J Russ | Canterbury |
| 1994 | P Hoult | Upper Hutt Valley | G Flewitt, R Webster | Otago | R Inglis, S Inglis, R Inglis | Golden Bay-Motueka | J Zittersteijn, S Masters, G L'Ami, S Gopperth | North Taranaki |
| 1995 | B Spicer | Canterbury | G Lawson, K Coombe | Wanganui | M Bryant, M Kidd, G Rayner | Waikato | G Pedersen, K Boothby, K Trass, S Olsen | Waikato |
| 1996 | V Littlejohn | Waikato | M Bryant, B McLeod | Waikato | B McNae, N Bartosh, D Peck | Waikato | C Taylor, K Smith, P Psaila, J Hunt | Auckland |
| 1997 | P Jamieson | Hutt Valley | D Bowman, H Bowman | Poverty Bay-East Coast | D Bowman, F McKenna, H Bowman | Poverty Bay-East Coast | P Hoult, N Semple, A Barr, L Hoult | Waikato |
| 1998 | S Flaszynski | North Taranaki | G Harvey, S Meyer | Manawatu | C Dow, G Coughey, K Setter | Tauranga | G L'Ami, J Zittersteijn, M Dempsey, M Phipp | North Taranaki |
| 1999 | K Coombe | Wanganui | T Moyle, J Boyd | Auckland | G L'Ami, M Dempsey, M Phipps | North Taranaki | C Pinker, W Pinker, S Patterson, M Neilson | Wanganui |
| 2000 | N Semple | Upper Hutt Valley | I Barr, R Jones | Upper Hutt Valley | D Wadsworth, R Inglis, R Inglis | Golden Bay-Motueka | N Warnes, F Persico, H Warnes, G Persico | Nelson |
| 2001 | J Frelan | Waikato | A Littlejohn, G Bell | Waikato | B Biggar, M Sackfield, J Southee | Manawatu | J Zittersteijn, M Ridley, P Upson, D Connett | North Taranaki |
| 2002 | B Meyer | Manawatu | G L'Ami, M Phipps | Otago | B Spicer, D Gilshnan, G McIvor | Manawatu | G L'Ami, T Gould, M Phipps, D Gallagher | Otago |
| 2003 | B Meyer | Manawatu | D Christini, L Christini | Northland | L Hazelton, D Hazelton, E Eccles | Tauranga | N Warnes, R Verdonk, H Warnes, K Moffat | Nelson |
| 2004 | S Thomas | Canterbury | S Poppleton, D Bell | Waikato | S Thomas, R Griffiths, J Thomas | Canterbury | G Taiaroa, L Bates, G Thompson, B Kinnaird | Auckland |
| 2005 | R Griffiths | Canterbury | P Hoult, N Semple | Upper Hutt Valley | B Matthews, A Jeffs, K Matthews | Canterbury | G Harvey, G Rayner, L Jenner, P Psaila | Auckland |
| 2006 | R Griffiths | Canterbury | G Rayner, P Psaila | North Wellington | R Griffiths, M Lawson, S Keith | Ashburton | D Lang, L McCurdy, G Lang, R McCurdy | North Wellington |
| 2007 | G McIvor | Manawatu | J Zittersteijn, M Ridley | North Taranaki | B Spicer, D Gilshnan, S Gilshnan | Canterbury | M Keen, G Fortune, A Diamond, B Keen | Southland |
| 2008 | C Matthews | Canterbury | T Veale, T Anderson | North Wellington | S Burnand, S Burnand, A Boyd | Waikato | N Warnes, F Persico, H Warnes, G Persico | Nelson |
| 2009 | S Burnand | Ashburton | B Spicer, R Osborne | Canterbury | F Persico, H Warnes, C Moffitt | Nelson | J Zino, R Corry, D Clarkson, J Zino | Hutt Valley |
| 2010 | K Setter | Tauranga | G Rayner, P Psaila | North Wellington | G Rayner, P Psaila, T Anderson | Auckland | J Moore, R Lochrie, T Griffin, D Moore | Manawatu |
| 2011 | P Midgley | Taranaki | A Diamond, M Keen | Southland | G Low, G Low, J Low | Southland | G L'Ami, P Midgely, M Phipps, L Phipps | Taranaki |
| 2012 | J Zino | Hutt Valley | S Fisher, P Cohen | Auckland | G L'Ami, M Phipps, L Phipps | Tauranga | D Archer, M Pruden, J Archer, C Archer | Waikato |
| 2013 | G L'Ami | Tauranga | T Gould, L Gould | Upper Hutt Valley | P Midgley, G Harvey, S Holmes | North Taranaki | J Zittersteijn, M Ridley, S Ridley, G Owen | North Taranaki |
| 2014 | A Diamond | Canterbury | G L'Ami, M Phipps | Tauranga | G Rayner, P Psaila, T Anderson | Auckland | J Zittersteijn, M Ridley, S Ridley, G Owen | North Taranaki |
| 2015 | A Compton | North Wellington | G L'Ami, M Phipps | Tauranga | G Rayner, P Psaila, T Anderson | Auckland | G L'Ami, P Midgely, M Phipps, L Phipps | Tauranga |
| 2016 | A Diamond | Upper Hutt Valley | G L'Ami, M Phipps | Tauranga | P Smith, G Coughey, K Setter | Tauranga | L Bellis, K Arvidson, R Bellis, D Warren | Nelson |
| 2017 | W Baker | Tauranga | P Wright, R Caddy | Waikato | N Warnes, G Persico, R Verdonk | Golden Bay-Motueka | A Diamond, P Wright, R Caddy, S Holmes | Waikato |
| 2018 | G Low | Southland | S Jacombs, M Jacombs | Hutt Valley | S Thomas, M Lawson, D French | Ashburton | G L'Ami, P Smith, M Phipps, L Phipps | Tauranga |
| 2019 | T Veale | Manawatu | G L'Ami, M Phipps | Tauranga | G L'Ami, M Phipps, L Phipps | Tauranga | M Ellis, J Parker, A McQuoid, D Ellis | Counties |
| 2020 | Not played | – | Not played | – | Not played | – | Not played | – |
| 2021 | S Blackbourn | Waikato | A Wilson, L Morrow | North Taranaki | G Low, G Low, J Low | Southland | S Blackbourn, J Sullivan, J Markham, E Ludeman | Canterbury |
| 2022 | M Trlin | Hutt Valley | A Reed, C Williams | Waikato | D Archer, C Andrew, J Archer | Waikato | S Jacombs, G Morgan, K Burnley, M Crighton | Hutt Valley |
| 2023 | R Mills | Auckland | N Trowell, M Trowell | Poverty Bay-East Coast | J Zittersteijn, G Harvey, P Midgley | North Taranaki | N Trowell, M Foster, D Foster, M Trowell | Poverty Bay-East Coast |
| 2024 | M Bassett | Ashburton | S Thomas, M Lawson | Ashburton | J Zino, S Jacombs, M Jacombs | Hutt Valley | J Zino, J Keene, S Jacombs, M Jacombs | Hutt Valley |

=== Career honours ===
NZIB players can achieve a Gold Star, the pinnacle individual achievement in the sport, by winning five national titles. As of 2024, 10 players have achieved this feat. One player has achieved the feat twice over, and one three times over.

National Championship Gold Star recipients
| Gold Stars | Name | First title | Most recent Gold Star earned |
|---|---|---|---|
| 3 | Grant L'Ami | 1994 | 2019 |
| 2 | Mike Phipps | 1998 | 2016 |
| 1 | Stewart 'Sen' Smith | 1962 | 1989 |
| 1 | Paul Psaila | 1985 | 2006 |
| 1 | Grant Rayner | 1995 | 2010 |
| 1 | John Zittersteijn | 1994 | 2013 |
| 1 | Nigel Warnes | 1986 | 2017 |
| 1 | Ashley Diamond | 2007 | 2017 |
| 1 | Lorraine Phipps | 2011 | 2019 |
| 1 | Paul Midgley | 2011 | 2023 |

== See also ==
- New Zealand National Bowls Championships
- Bowls New Zealand
