= Baxter Cup =

- Sport: Curling
- Awarded for: Dunedin Curling Club top points scorer (1884-1895); Winning club at annual match (1900-?); Winning club at one-day bonspiel (?-present)
- Presented by: Naesby Curling Council

History
- First award: 1884
- Most recent: Ranfurly, 2024

The Baxter Cup is the oldest New Zealand trophy in the sport of curling, having first been contested in 1884. The Cup is named David Baxter, a founding member of Dunedin Curling Club who donated it to the Club for use as their points trophy. It is currently awarded to the winner of Naseby Curling Council's one-day bonspiel, which was most recently won by Ranfurly in the 2024 bonspiel.

== History ==
The trophy was initially donated to Dunedin Curling Club for use as the Club's points trophy by founding member David Baxter, and was subsequently named in his honour. It was first played for in 1884, ten years after the club was established. The only known winner from this period is James Anderson, who won the competition in 1885.

=== Central Otago competition ===
By 1895, a lack of ice resulted in the Dunedin Curling Club being disbanded and the club's trophy being given by David Baxter to Otago Central Curling Club shortly before his death for use as an annual prize between that club and nearby Mt. Ida Curling Club. Upon moving to the Otago Central Curling Club, the Cup was first won by Otago Central before being claimed by Mt. Ida the following year.In 1903, this was expanded to include a newly-formed club at Naseby, who won on their debut, and by 1910 also included the Maniototo Curling Club. During this period, clubs were represented by two teams each, with play taking place over a single day. By 1934, the competition had expanded to 15 clubs, largely from across central Otago. In 1935, an estimated 96 people took part in the cup.

=== Recent years ===
Although the early years saw the competition held annually, changing conditions eventually forced a shift to an intermittent one-day bonspiel rather than an annual competition due to a lack of suitable natural ice in some years. (Note: Since the cup must be held on natural ice, bonspiels can only be held in years where the weather is cold enough.) Despite this, competition for the cup has continued into the present day, with it being held on six occasions since 2001. The most recent of these was in 2024, when it was won by Ranfurly Curling Club. This was the first time the competition had been held since 2017, when it was won by Kyeburn Curling Club, who won the final against Ranfurly's Mount Ida Curling Club.
