= 2020 in the United Kingdom =

The following is a list of notable events, births and deaths from 2020 in the United Kingdom. The COVID-19 pandemic largely dominated events in the UK during this year, as in most of the world.

== Incumbents ==
- Monarch – Elizabeth II
- Prime Minister – Boris Johnson (Conservative)

== Events ==
=== January ===
- 4 January – The Foreign Office warns British nationals against all but essential travel to Iran and Iraq, following a US airstrike in Baghdad the previous day in which Iranian general Qasem Soleimani was killed.
- 6 January
  - Reynhard Sinaga, described as "the most prolific rapist in British legal history", is sentenced to life in prison with a minimum term of 30 years, after being found guilty of raping or sexually assaulting 48 men in Manchester. Police believe he may have been responsible for assaulting a total of nearly 200 victims.
  - Downing Street states that the UK will not support US President Donald Trump's threat to bomb Iranian cultural and heritage sites.
- 7 January – The Labour Party leadership election formally begins, with the new leader scheduled to be announced on 4 April.
- 8 January – Prince Harry, Duke of Sussex, and Meghan, Duchess of Sussex, announce that they plan to "step back as senior members" of the United Kingdom's royal family, and divide their time between the UK and North America.
- 9 January
  - The House of Commons gives its third and final backing to the European Union Withdrawal Agreement Bill, voting 330 to 231 in favour; the bill now passes to the House of Lords for scrutiny.
  - The British and Irish governments publish a deal aimed at restoring the Northern Ireland Executive; the Democratic Unionist Party (DUP) gives its backing to the agreement.
- 10 January – Sinn Féin gives its backing to a deal to restore power-sharing government to Northern Ireland for the first time since 2017.
- 11 January
  - The Northern Ireland Assembly reconvenes after a three-year hiatus; DUP leader Arlene Foster is appointed Northern Ireland's first minister, while Sinn Féin's Michelle O'Neill is appointed deputy first minister.
  - Robert Macaire, the British ambassador to Iran, is briefly detained in Iran after attending a vigil for those killed on Ukraine International Airlines Flight 752. Iran summoned him to appear at its foreign ministry the following day after saying he had been "an unknown foreigner in an illegal gathering".
- 13 January – Following a meeting of senior royals, the Queen agrees to a "period of transition" during which the Duke and Duchess of Sussex will spend time in Canada and the UK.
- 14 January
  - The government agrees to a rescue package for troubled regional airline Flybe to stop it going into administration.
  - Boris Johnson formally rejects Scottish First Minister Nicola Sturgeon's request for a second independence referendum.
- 16 January – Legislation is drafted before Parliament allowing the use of television cameras during trials at Crown Courts in England and Wales, but only the judges will be filmed.
- 17 January – Construction begins on Dogger Bank Wind Farm, which will become the world's largest offshore wind farm when complete, with 260-metre high turbines generating a combined 3.6 gigawatts and supplying 4.5 million homes.
- 18 January – Buckingham Palace confirms that from spring 2020 the Duke and Duchess of Sussex will no longer use their royal titles and will no longer receive public funds for their royal duties.
- 21 January – The Office of Rail and Road announces that Network Rail is being investigated over its poor performance on routes used by train operators Arriva Rail North and TransPennine Express.
- 22 January – Boris Johnson's EU withdrawal deal successfully completes its passage through parliament, with the EU Withdrawal Agreement Bill being voted through without change, after several amendments proposed by the House of Lords are rejected.
- 23 January – Parliamentary ratification of Boris Johnson's EU withdrawal deal is completed with Royal Assent being given to the EU Withdrawal Agreement Bill.
- 24 January
  - The UK's EU withdrawal agreement is signed by both parties; firstly in the morning in Brussels by European Council president Charles Michel and European Commission president Ursula von der Leyen for the EU, then after travelling on the Eurostar in a diplomatic case, in London in the afternoon by Prime Minister Boris Johnson for the UK.
  - Police announce that live facial recognition technology will be rolled out across London.
- 25 January – A newly appointed member of the Grenfell Tower fire public enquiry panel resigns after being linked to the company which supplied cladding for the block.
- 27 January – The Health Secretary, Matt Hancock, tells the House of Commons that 200 British citizens trapped in Wuhan, China, will be offered repatriation to the UK, in light of the COVID-19 pandemic in Hubei.
- 28 January – The Prime Minister approves a limited "non-core" role for China's Huawei in the United Kingdom's 5G mobile network, resisting U.S. pressure to exclude the company on fears China could use it to steal data.
- 29 January
  - British Airways suspends all flights to and from mainland China with immediate effect, due to the ongoing COVID-19 pandemic in mainland China.
  - Transport Secretary Grant Shapps announces that troubled train operator Arriva Rail North will be brought under government control from 1 March following a prolonged period of delays and poor performance.
  - The Guardian announces that it will no longer accept advertising from oil and gas companies, becoming the first major global news organisation to institute an outright ban on taking money from the fossil fuel industry.
  - The European Parliament ratifies the Brexit withdrawal agreement in Brussels, ensuring that if the United Kingdom leaves the European Union, as scheduled, at 23:00 GMT on 31 January 2020, they will do so with a deal.
- 30 January – COVID-19 in the UK: The first two known cases of infection with SARS-CoV-2 (at this time known as 2019-nCoV) in the United Kingdom, two Chinese nationals staying in York, are confirmed.
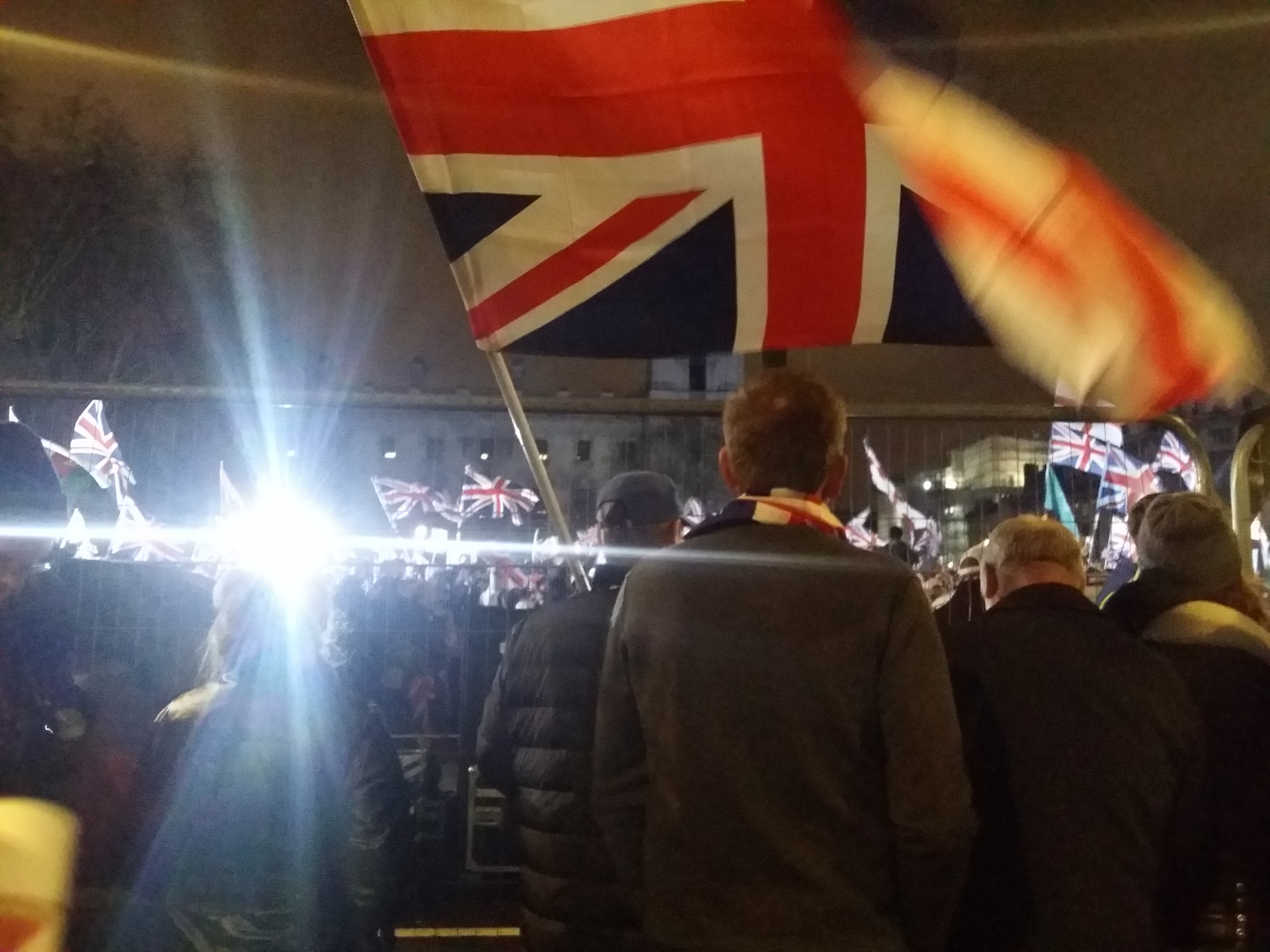
  Celebrations in Westminster on the day of the UK's withdrawal from the EU
- 31 January – The United Kingdom leaves the European Union, beginning an 11-month transition period, during which it remains in the Single Market and Customs Union.

=== February ===
- 1 February – Austria, Germany, and Slovenia confirm they will not extradite their nationals if they are accused of crimes in the UK.
- 4 February – In London, Prime Minister Boris Johnson, naturalist Sir David Attenborough, and Italian Prime Minister Giuseppe Conte launch the 26th session of the Conference of the Parties (COP26), a major UN climate summit to be held in Glasgow in November 2020 (later postponed to 2021). Johnson announces, subject to consultation, that coal power could be phased out by 2024, a year earlier than previously planned and the phase-out of new petrol and diesel vehicles could be brought forward from 2040 to 2035. He also reaffirms the UK's commitment to reaching net zero carbon by 2050.
- 6 February – COVID-19 in the UK: A third case of infection with SARS-CoV-2 is confirmed in the UK.
- 7 February – Buckingham Palace announces that the wedding of Princess Beatrice of York and Edoardo Mapelli Mozzi will take place on 29 May (later postponed to 17 July).
- 8–9 February – Storm Ciara hits the United Kingdom, bringing winds of up to 80 mph (130 km/h).
- 9 February – A British Airways Boeing 747-400 aircraft makes the fastest ever subsonic New York to London Heathrow crossing, achieved in 4 hours 56 minutes. It reaches ground speeds of up to 825 mph by riding the jet stream bringing Storm Ciara to the UK.
- 10 February
  - The government confirms it has begun to study the feasibility of a Scotland-Northern Ireland bridge, with project cost estimates of £15–20bn.
  - In a "historic" decision, councillors reject a proposed expansion of Bristol Airport, by 18 votes to seven, on the grounds that it would exacerbate climate change, damage the health of local people, and harm flora and fauna.
- 11 February
  - The Terrorist Offenders Bill, designed to end the early release of prisoners convicted of terrorist offences, is presented to parliament.
  - Following a review of the project, Prime Minister Boris Johnson announces that the controversial High Speed 2 rail link (HS2) will be built.
- 12 February
  - The Terrorist Offenders Bill passes unopposed through the House of Commons to complete the first stage of the process to becoming law.
  - The government announces plans to extend the remit of the media regulator Ofcom to include internet and social media content in the UK.
- 13 February
  - Boris Johnson carries out a cabinet reshuffle.
  - Sajid Javid resigns as Chancellor of the Exchequer. He is succeeded by Rishi Sunak.
- 16 February – Storm Dennis: A record high number of flood warnings are declared over England, with 600 in place by the evening. Police declare major incidents in a number of regions, including south Wales, after towns and villages north of Cardiff receive more than a month's worth of rainfall in 24 hours.
- 17 February – Business and Energy Secretary and COP26 President Alok Sharma announces £1.2 billion in funding for a new supercomputer to improve weather and climate models in the UK.
- 20 February – A new £20 polymer banknote enters circulation. Featuring the face of painter J. M. W. Turner, it joins the updated and more secure £5 and £10 notes that were introduced in 2016 and 2017, respectively.
- 21 February – COVID-19 in the UK: A sample is taken from a 75-year-old woman from Nottinghamshire later identified as the earliest person known to have been infected by SARS-CoV-2 in the UK; the sample tests positive when examined months later in August. She is also probably the first person in the UK to die with COVID-19.
- 25 February – A landmark study shows that life expectancy in England has stalled for the first time in more than 100 years and that health inequities are growing wider than a decade ago. The study says that this can largely be attributed to the United Kingdom government austerity programme.
- 27 February
  - Campaigners win a Court of Appeal ruling over controversial plans for a third runway at Heathrow Airport, on environmental grounds.
  - A study is released that links increases in psychological distress and clinical depression with Universal Credit.
- 28 February – COVID-19 in the UK: The first British death from COVID-19 is confirmed by the Japanese Health Ministry; a man quarantined on the Diamond Princess cruise ship.
- 28 February–1 March – Storm Jorge brings more flooding, heavy rain and strong winds to the UK, the third significant storm to hit the country in three weeks.
- 29 February
  - The Home Office's top civil servant, Sir Philip Rutnam, resigns and says he plans to claim constructive dismissal by the government following a series of clashes with the Home Secretary, Priti Patel.
  - Boris Johnson announces that he and his partner, Carrie Symonds, are expecting a baby in the summer, and that they are engaged.

=== March ===
- 2 March – COVID-19 in the UK: The government holds a COBRA meeting to discuss its preparations and response to the outbreak, as the number of British cases jumps to 133.
- 3 March
  - COVID-19 in the UK: The government publishes its action plan for dealing with the COVID-19 pandemic. This includes scenarios ranging from a milder pandemic to a "severe prolonged pandemic as experienced in 1918" and warns that a fifth of the national workforce could be absent from work during the infection's peak.
  - The Met Office reports that last month was the wettest February in the UK since records began in 1872, with an average of 209.1mm of rainfall.
- 5 March
  - COVID-19 in the UK:
    - The airline Flybe collapses into administration, due in part to the impact of the COVID-19 pandemic on international travel.
    - What is at this time thought to be the first death from COVID-19 in the UK is announced, with 295 people now having tested positive. England's Chief Medical Officer, Chris Whitty, tells MPs that the UK has now moved to the second stage of dealing with SARS-CoV-2 – from "containment" to the "delay" phase.
- 6 March – COVID-19 in the UK: The Prime Minister announces £46 million in funding for research into a COVID-19 vaccine and rapid COVID-19 testing.
- 8 March – COVID-19 in the UK: A third death from COVID-19 is reported, at North Manchester General Hospital, as the number of cases in the UK reaches 501, the largest single-day increase so far.
- 9 March – COVID-19 in the UK: The FTSE 100 plunges by more than 8%, its largest intraday fall since 2008, amid concerns over the spread of SARS-CoV-2.
- 10 March – COVID-19 in the UK: Health Minister Nadine Dorries tests positive for SARS-CoV-2.
- 11 March
  - COVID-19 in the UK: The number of British cases crosses 1,000, with 403 new cases bringing the total to 1,317.
  - The Bank of England cuts its baseline interest rate from 0.75% to 0.25%, back down to the lowest level in history.
  - Chancellor of the Exchequer Rishi Sunak presents the Johnson Government's first budget, which includes £30 billion in measures to protect the economy from the effects of the pandemic.
- 12 March – Following a series of recent major falls, the FTSE 100 plunges again, this time by over 10%, its biggest drop since 1987. Other markets around the world are similarly affected by ongoing economic turmoil.
- 13 March
  - COVID-19 pandemic in England:
    - The Premier League 2019–2020 season is suspended, among a growing list of worldwide sporting cancellations and postponements due to COVID-19.
    - Elections including the English local elections, London mayoral election and police and crime commissioner elections, scheduled for May 2020, are postponed for a year.
- 14 March
  - COVID-19 in the UK:
    - A further 10 people are reported to have died from COVID-19, almost doubling the British death toll from 11 to 21. Government data later reveals the figure was even higher at this time. The government's aim for a "herd immunity" approach generates controversy.
    - Modellers within 10 Downing Street, using the latest data from the Scientific Advisory Group for Emergencies, convince the Prime Minister that the pandemic is spreading faster than expected and will overwhelm hospitals unless drastic action is taken.
    - British retailers release a joint letter asking customers not to panic buy products after some supermarkets sell out of items such as pasta, hand gel and toilet paper.
    - Vice President of the United States, Mike Pence, announces the US is to extend its European travel ban to include the UK from 16 March.
- 15 March
  - COVID-19 in the UK:
    - The Foreign Office advises against "all but essential travel" to the US.
    - Health Secretary Matt Hancock says that every British resident over the age of 70 will be told "within the coming weeks" to self-isolate for "a very long time" to shield them from infection with SARS-CoV-2.
    - The government announces plans to hold daily televised press conferences to update the public on the pandemic, starting on Monday 16 March.
- 16 March
  - COVID-19 in the UK:
    - The British death toll from the COVID-19 is reported to have reached 55, with the number of cases of the illness passing 1,500. Government data later reveals the figure was even higher at this time.
    - Prime Minister Boris Johnson advises everyone in the UK against "non-essential" travel and contact with others to curb SARS-CoV-2, as well as suggesting people should avoid pubs, clubs and theatres, and work from home if possible. Pregnant women, people over the age of 70 and those with certain health conditions are urged to consider the advice "particularly important", and will be asked to self-isolate within days.
    - The BBC delays its planned changes to TV licences for the over-75s from June to August because of the pandemic.
- 17 March
  - COVID-19 pandemic in England: NHS England announces that all non-urgent operations in England will be postponed from 15 April to free up 30,000 beds to accommodate COVID-19 patients.
  - Hashem Abedi, brother of Manchester Arena bomber Salman Abedi, is found guilty of murdering 22 people in 2017.
  - COVID-19 in the UK:
    - The Chancellor of the Exchequer, Rishi Sunak, announces that £330bn will be made available in loan guarantees for businesses affected by the British government response to the COVID-19 pandemic.
    - The British coronavirus-related death toll rises to 199, while the number of confirmed cases of the illness rises to 4,457.
- 18 March
  - COVID-19 in the UK:
    - The British death toll from COVID-19 is reported to have exceeded 100, with 32 new cases taking the total to 104. Government data later reveals the figure was even higher at this time.
    - The government announces that all schools in the United Kingdom will close from the afternoon of Friday 20 March except for vulnerable children and the children of key workers, and that no exams will take place in England and Wales this academic year.
    - The 50th anniversary Glastonbury Festival is cancelled as a result of the pandemic.
  - Pound sterling falls below $1.18, its lowest level since 1985.
  - The government announces emergency legislation to bring in a complete ban on new evictions for three months as part of measures to help protect renters in social and private rented accommodation.
- 19 March – In an emergency move, the Bank of England cuts interest rates again, from 0.25% to 0.1%. This is the lowest in the Bank's 325-year history.
- 20 March
  - COVID-19 pandemic in England: Northwick Park Hospital in Harrow declares a "critical incident" due to a surge in patients with COVID-19.
  - COVID-19 in the UK:
    - Chancellor Rishi Sunak announces that the government will pay 80% of wages for employees not working, up to £2,500 a month, as part of "unprecedented" measures to protect people's jobs.
    - Prime Minister Boris Johnson orders all cafes, pubs and restaurants to close from the evening of 20 March, except for take-away food, to promote social distancing. All the UK's nightclubs, theatres, cinemas, gyms and leisure centres are told to close "as soon as they reasonably can".
- 21 March – COVID-19 in the UK: Environment Secretary George Eustice urges shoppers to stop panic buying, as supermarkets around the UK struggle to keep up with demand. Tesco, Asda, Aldi Süd, and Lidl are reported to have begun a recruitment drive for up to 30,000 new staff.
- 22 March
  - COVID-19 in the UK:
    - The Nursing and Midwifery Council announces that more than 5,600 former nurses have registered to offer their services in the pandemic.
    - Boris Johnson warns that "tougher measures" may be introduced if people do not follow government advice on social distancing.
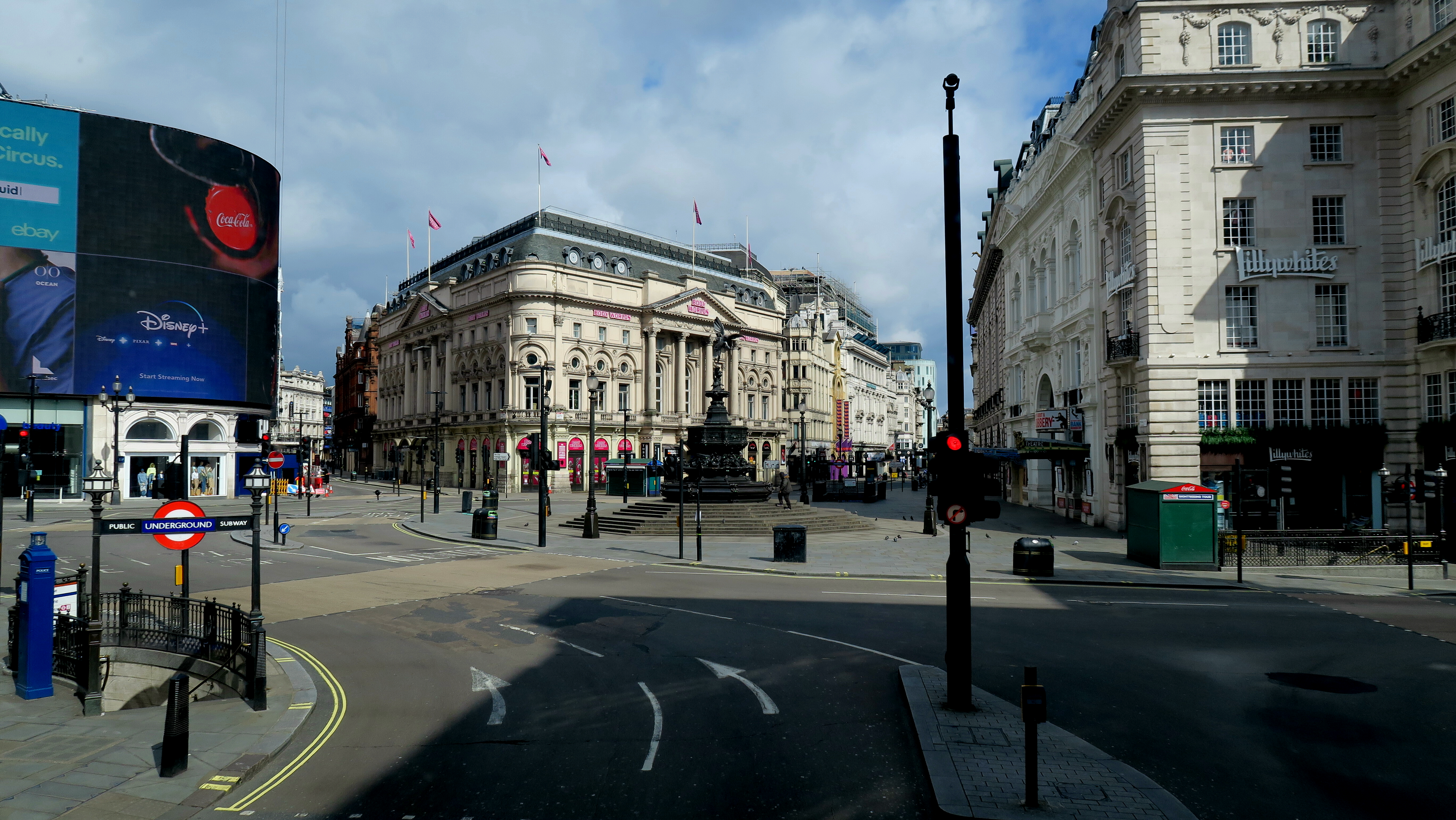
      Empty streets in central London at the end of March 2020
- 23 March
  - COVID-19 in the UK:
    - In a televised address, Boris Johnson announces a UK-wide lockdown with immediate effect, to contain the spread of the SARS-CoV-2. People can leave their homes only for "very limited purposes" – shopping for basic necessities; for one form of exercise a day; for any medical need; and to travel to and from work when "absolutely necessary". A number of other restrictions are imposed, with police given powers to enforce the measures, including the use of fines.
    - Pride in London, the UK's largest LGBT pride festival, scheduled for 27 June, is the latest event to be postponed. It is one of a hundred pride events to be postponed or cancelled in the UK.
    - The government announces emergency measures to safeguard rail transport in England, with season ticket holders given refunds if working from home, and rail franchise agreements nationalised for at least six months to prevent rail companies from collapsing.
  - Alex Salmond is cleared of sexually assaulting nine women while he was Scotland's First Minister.
- 24 March
  - COVID-19 in the UK:
    - The UK records its highest number of COVID-19 deaths in one day, after another 87 people die across the country, bringing the total to 422. Government data later reveals the figure was even higher at this time.
    - For the first time, all of the UK's mobile networks send out a government text alert, ordering people to stay at home. The message reads: "GOV.UK CORONAVIRUS ALERT. New rules in force now: you must stay at home. More info and exemptions at gov.uk/coronavirus Stay at home. Protect the NHS. Save lives."
    - Health Secretary Matt Hancock announces the government will open a temporary hospital, the NHS Nightingale Hospital London at the ExCeL London, to add extra critical care capacity in response to the pandemic.
- 25 March
  - COVID-19 in the UK:
    - Prince Charles tests positive for COVID-19.
    - Parliament shuts down for a month.
    - British Transport Police deploys 500 officers to patrol Great Britain's rail network, in an effort to discourage non-essential journeys. New measures are also introduced on the London Underground to reduce passenger numbers.
- 26 March
  - COVID-19 in the UK:
    - The government announces that the self-employed will be paid 80% of profits, up to £2,500 a month, to help them cope during the economic crisis triggered by COVID-19.
    - At 8pm, millions of people around the country take part in a "Clap for Our Carers" tribute, applauding the NHS and other care workers. The gesture is repeated every Thursday for ten weeks.
- 27 March
  - COVID-19 in the UK:
    - Prime Minister Boris Johnson tests positive for COVID-19, and will self-isolate in 10 Downing Street.
    - Health Secretary Matt Hancock tests positive for COVID-19 and reports that he is working from home and self-isolating.
- 31 March – COVID-19 in the UK: A significant rise in anxiety and depression among the British population is reported following the lockdown.

=== April ===
- 1 April
  - The contactless payment limit for in-store spending is raised from £30 to £45.
  - The UK's National Living Wage rises from £8.21 to £8.72, an increase of 6.2%.
  - The 26th session of the Conference of the Parties (COP26), a major UN climate summit which was to be held in Glasgow in November 2020, is postponed until 2021 due to the COVID-19 pandemic.
- 3 April – COVID-19 pandemic in England: NHS Nightingale Hospital London, the first temporary critical care hospital to treat COVID-19 patients, opens at the ExCeL centre in East London, employing NHS staff and military personnel, with a bed capacity of up to 4,000. It is the first of several temporary critical care hospitals planned across the UK.
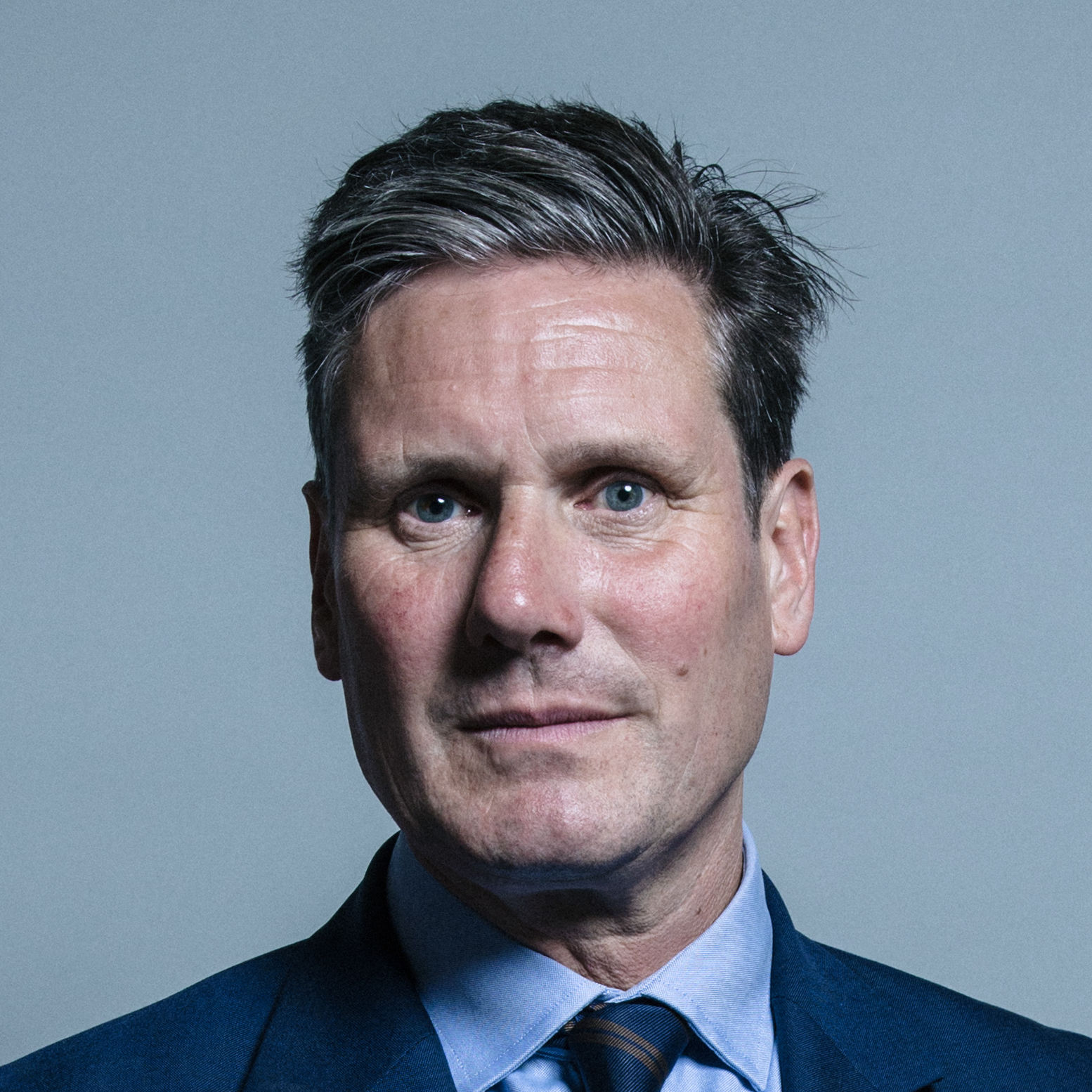
  Newly elected Labour leader Keir Starmer
- 4 April – 2020 Labour Party leadership election: Keir Starmer is elected as the leader of the Labour Party, succeeding Jeremy Corbyn, and Angela Rayner is elected as deputy leader of the party.
- 5 April
  - COVID-19 in the UK:
    - Queen Elizabeth II makes a rare broadcast to the UK and the wider Commonwealth, something she has done on only four previous occasions. In the address she thanks people for following the government's social distancing rules and pays tribute to key workers, and says the UK "will succeed" in its fight against the epidemic but may have "more still to endure".
    - Prime Minister Boris Johnson is admitted to hospital for tests after testing positive for SARS-CoV-2 ten days earlier.
- 6 April
  - Debenhams, one of the UK's largest and oldest department stores, goes into administration for the second time in a year.
  - COVID-19 in the UK:
    - The death toll from COVID-19 in the UK is reported to have exceeded 5,000. The total number of reported cases is nearly 52,000. Government data later reveals the figure was even higher at this time.
    - Prime Minister Boris Johnson is taken into intensive care after being admitted to hospital for COVID-19 the day before. It is announced that First Secretary of State Dominic Raab will deputise for him.
- 8 April
  - COVID-19 in the UK:
    - Daily reported COVID-related deaths in this wave peak at 977.
    - Nine million workers are expected to be furloughed under the government's job retention scheme, with an estimated cost to the taxpayer of between £30bn and £40bn, the Resolution Foundation reports, using figures from the British Chambers of Commerce.
- 9 April
  - COVID-19 in the UK:
    - First Secretary of State Dominic Raab says the UK is "starting to see the impact" of the restrictions but that it is "too early" to lift them, and urges people to stay indoors over the Easter weekend.
    - Prime Minister Boris Johnson is moved out of intensive care, but remains in hospital.
- 11 April – COVID-19 in the UK: Queen Elizabeth II makes her first ever Easter message to the nation, in which she states "coronavirus will not overcome us" and that "we need Easter as much as ever."
- 12 April
  - COVID-19 in the UK:
    - Prime Minister Boris Johnson is discharged from hospital after being treated for COVID-19 and will continue his recovery at Chequers.
    - The number of people who died in hospital with SARS-CoV-2 infections in the UK passes 10,000, after a daily rise of 737.
- 16 April
  - COVID-19 in the UK:
    - A 99-year-old war veteran, Tom Moore, raises over £13 million (subsequently over £25 million) for NHS Charities Together after walking more than 100 laps of his garden, with hundreds of thousands (subsequently over a million) of people donating to his JustGiving page.
    - Foreign Secretary Dominic Raab announces a three-week extension to the nationwide lockdown measures as the number of confirmed COVID-19 cases in the UK surpasses 100,000.
- 19 April – COVID-19 in the UK: Michael Gove, in a BBC interview with Andrew Marr, concedes that the Prime Minister missed five COBRA meetings in the early stages of the viral outbreak, and that the UK shipped personal protective equipment to China in February.
- 20 April – COVID-19 pandemic in Scotland: Scotland's new temporary NHS Louisa Jordan Hospital is now ready to receive COVID-19 patients.
- 21 April – COVID-19 in the UK: Data from the Office for National Statistics show the number of deaths in England and Wales has risen to its highest in 20 years. Figures show 18,500 deaths were recorded in the week up to 10 April, 8,000 more than usual for this time of year, with one in three linked to COVID-19.
- 22 April
  - COVID-19 in the UK:
    - MPs take part in the first "virtual" Prime Minister's Questions, via Zoom.
    - Chief Medical Officer Chris Whitty says it is likely the UK will have to live under some disruptive social distancing measures for at least the rest of the year.
- 23 April – COVID-19 in the UK: The first human clinical trial in Europe of a COVID-19 vaccine, AZD1222, begins in Oxford.
- 24 April – COVID-19 pandemic in England: The government launches a website for key workers to apply for SARS-CoV-2 tests at drive-through centres and for home delivery.
- 25 April – COVID-19 in the UK: The number of people who have died in hospital with SARS-CoV-2 infections in the UK exceeds 20,000.
- 27 April
  - COVID-19 in the UK: Boris Johnson returns to work after three weeks of illness. In his first speech outside 10 Downing Street since recovering from COVID-19, he urges the public not to lose patience with the lockdown, warning that the UK is at the moment of "maximum risk".
  - COVID-19 pandemic in England: NHS Nightingale Hospital Bristol is opened in a virtual ceremony by Health Secretary Matt Hancock, Prince Edward, Earl of Wessex, and the chief executive of NHS England, Simon Stevens.
- 28 April
  - COVID-19 in the UK:
    - A minute's moment of silence is held across the UK to commemorate the key workers who have died from COVID-19.
    - Figures from the Office for National Statistics show a third of deaths in England and Wales from COVID-19 are occurring in care homes, with 2,000 recorded in the week up to 17 April.
  - COVID-19 pandemic in Scotland: The Scottish Government recommends that people cover their faces in certain enclosed public spaces like shops and public transport. British ministers are reported to be considering the issue.
- 29 April
  - Prime Minister Boris Johnson and his fiancée, Carrie Symonds announce that she has given birth to their son, Wilfred Lawrie Nicholas Johnson in the early hours of the morning.
  - COVID-19 in the UK: The British death toll from the virus becomes the second highest in Europe at 26,097.
- 30 April
  - COVID-19 in the UK: Boris Johnson says the UK is "past the peak" of the epidemic, but that the country must not "risk a second spike", and announces that he will set out a "comprehensive plan" to restart the economy next week.
  - Clothing brands Oasis and Warehouse close with the loss of 1,800 more jobs after going into administration in mid-month.

=== May ===
- 4 May
  - MP Conor Burns resigns as Minister of State for Trade Policy after a report found he used his position as an MP to intimidate a member of the public.
  - COVID-19 in the UK: The ONS reports that more than 25 million people – 49.6% of over-16s in the United Kingdom – rated their anxiety as "high" after the lockdown, more than double the number who did so in December 2019. Overall measures of well-being are reported to be at their lowest levels since records began in 2011.
- 5 May
  - COVID-19 in the UK:
    - The British death toll from COVID-19 becomes the highest in Europe at 32,313 (including suspected) after exceeding the death toll of 29,029 (excluding suspected) in Italy.
    - Professor Neil Ferguson, a prominent scientific adviser to the government, resigns from the government's Scientific Advisory Group for Emergencies after apparently behaving contrary to the government's messages on social distancing by meeting his "married lover".
  - COVID-19 pandemic in England:
    - Trials of an NHS contact-tracing app for NHS England and NHS Wales start on the Isle of Wight with the app being made available to healthcare and council workers.
    - NHS Nightingale Hospital North East, a temporary critical care hospital built near Sunderland for COVID-19 patients, is officially opened by Health Secretary Matt Hancock. The virtual ceremony features TV celebrities Ant and Dec, football pundit Alan Shearer and cricketer Ben Stokes.
- 6 May – The National Assembly for Wales is renamed Senedd Cymru – Welsh Parliament.
- 7 May
  - COVID-19 in the UK:
    - The government confirms that 400,000 gowns ordered from Turkey to protect NHS staff from SARS-CoV-2 have been impounded, after failing to meet the required safety standards.
    - The Bank of England warns that the economy is on course to shrink by 14% in 2020 due to the impact of COVID-19, pushing the UK into its deepest recession on record.
  - Mobile operator O2 and broadband giant Virgin Media announce a merger.
- 10 May – COVID-19 pandemic in England: The government reveals that its lockdown slogan "Stay Home. Protect the NHS. Save Lives." is to be replaced, in England, with the new message, "Stay alert. Control the virus. Save lives", while Scotland, Wales and Northern Ireland are sticking with "stay at home". A new alert scale system for England is also announced, ranging from green (level one) to red (level five), similar to the UK's Terror Threat Levels.
- 12 May
  - COVID-19 in the UK:
    - The official death toll from COVID-19 exceeds 40,000 – including almost 10,000 care home residents.
    - The British furlough scheme is extended until October, with employees continuing to receive 80% of their monthly wages up to £2,500. A quarter of the workforce, some 7.5 million people, are now covered by the scheme, costing £14bn a month.
  - COVID-19 pandemic in Northern Ireland: The Northern Ireland Executive publishes its five-stage policy for easing lockdown without a timetable and titled Executive Approach to Decision-Making.
- 14 May – COVID-19 pandemic in Northern Ireland: The first minister Arlene Foster announces that scientific data is sufficiently encouraging to begin easing the lockdown on Monday 18 May.
- 17 May – A law student is shot dead by a hitman on a street in Blackburn, Lancashire.
- 18 May
  - COVID-19 in the UK:
    - Loss of smell or taste are added to the UK's official list of symptoms of COVID-19 that people should look out for and self-isolate with.
    - Testing for the virus is extended to everyone aged five and over in the UK with symptoms. Health Secretary Matt Hancock announces that 100,678 tests were conducted the previous day.
  - COVID-19 pandemic in Scotland: First minister Nicola Sturgeon announces that lockdown restrictions in Scotland will be eased from 28 May and that anyone over the age of five can now be tested for SARS-CoV-2.
  - COVID-19 pandemic in Northern Ireland: The first easing of lockdown in NI is rolled out, with garden centres and recycling facilities reopening.
- 19 May
  - Captain Tom Moore, who raised £32m for NHS charities, is to be knighted for his fundraising efforts following a special nomination from Boris Johnson.
  - COVID-19 in the UK: Cambridge University becomes the first British institution to announce it is moving all lectures online until summer 2021.
  - COVID-19 pandemic in Northern Ireland: the Northern Ireland Executive announces the first stage of its lockdown-ending policy will go fully into effect, re-opening certain entertainment and sports facilities. Arlene Foster announces contact tracing will begin in Northern Ireland. Robin Swann announces all residents and staff of care homes are to be tested by the end of June.
- 20 May – COVID-19 in the UK: Rolls-Royce announce plans to cut 9,000 jobs as a result of the pandemic, predominantly affecting its British base in Derby, and warns that it could take "several years" for the airline industry to recover.
- 21 May
  - COVID-19 in the UK:
    - Antibody tests to check if someone has had SARS-CoV-2 infection will be made available on the NHS after a deal is agreed between the government and the pharmaceutical company, Roche.
    - The NHS Confederation warns that time is running out to finalise a test, track and trace strategy to avoid a possible second wave of COVID-19 cases.
  - A surcharge for overseas NHS staff and care workers to use the health service (on top of National Insurance and income tax) is scrapped after mounting pressure from MPs.
- 22 May – COVID-19 in the UK: The Office for National Statistics reports that government borrowing rose to £62bn in April, the highest monthly figure on record, after heavy spending in the British government response to the COVID-19 pandemic.
- 23 May – Dominic Cummings scandal: Dominic Cummings, Boris Johnson's senior adviser, faces calls to resign after a joint investigation by the Daily Mirror and The Guardian asserts that he travelled 260 miles from London to his parents' home in Durham whilst he was displaying COVID-19 symptoms, during lockdown.
- 24 May – Dominic Cummings scandal: After The Observer and the Sunday Mirror print allegations that Dominic Cummings made a second trip to the North East during lockdown, Boris Johnson expresses his support for his senior adviser during the government's coronavirus daily briefing, saying he had acted "responsibly, legally and with integrity".
- 25 May – Dominic Cummings scandal: Dominic Cummings says "I don't regret what I did" as he addresses criticism for his actions in an unprecedented public statement from a senior adviser in the 10 Downing Street Rose Garden.
- 26 May – Dominic Cummings scandal: Junior minister Douglas Ross resigns, saying that Dominic Cummings' view on lockdown guidance is "not shared by the vast majority of people who have done as the government asked."
- 27 May – Dominic Cummings scandal: Boris Johnson appears before the House of Commons Liaison Committee for the first time, during which he rules out an inquiry into Dominic Cummings' actions during lockdown.
- 28 May
  - COVID-19 pandemic in Scotland: First Minister of Scotland Nicola Sturgeon confirms an easing of the lockdown in Scotland from Friday 29 May with people able to meet friends and family outside in groups of no more than eight, but keeping two metres apart.
  - COVID-19 in the UK:
    - Contact tracing systems go live in England and Scotland – NHS Test and Trace in England and Test and Protect in Scotland.
    - EasyJet announces plans to cut up to 4,500 jobs as it struggles with a collapse in air travel caused by the pandemic.
  - The government approves Cleve Hill Solar Park on the north Kent coast, the UK's biggest ever solar farm at 900 acres in size and 350MW of capacity, enough to power over 91,000 homes.
  - Dominic Cummings scandal: Durham Constabulary conclude that no offence had been committed by Dominic Cummings in travelling from London to Durham during lockdown. They also say that a minor breach of the lockdown rules might have occurred at Barnard Castle, but because there was no apparent breach of the social distancing rules, no further action would be taken.
- 29 May
  - COVID-19 in the UK: Chancellor Rishi Sunak confirms that the Coronavirus Job Retention Scheme will end at the end of October, with employers having to pay National Insurance and pension contributions from August, 10% of pay from September, and then 20% in October.
  - COVID-19 pandemic in Wales: First Minister of Wales Mark Drakeford announces an easing of lockdown restrictions in Wales from 1 June, allowing people from two different households to meet outdoors whilst socially distancing.
- 30 May – COVID-19 pandemic in England: Boris Johnson announces a relaxing of restrictions in England for the 2.2 million clinically extremely vulnerable individuals who have been "shielding" in their homes, allowing them to spend time outdoors for the first time in ten weeks from 1 June.
- 31 May
  - COVID-19 pandemic in England: Foreign Secretary Dominic Raab defends the government's decision to ease lockdown restrictions after concerns from scientists that there could be a new spike in SARS-CoV-2 infections, insisting that England "can't just stay in lockdown forever".
  - Thousands of people gather in London, Manchester and Cardiff to protest following the murder of George Floyd, an unarmed black man murdered by a white police officer in the U.S.
  - May 2020 is reported as the sunniest on recent record in the UK, with 266 hours of sunshine. It is also the warmest and driest May ever recorded, beating the previous record set in 2018. The Met Office confirms that Spring 2020 as a whole broke numerous other records.

=== June ===
- 1 June – COVID-19 pandemic in England: some primary schools in England reopen to pupils from Reception, Year 1 and Year 6, with head teachers reporting "highly variable" levels of attendance ranging from 40% to 70%.
- 2 June
  - COVID-19 in the UK: The Guardian calculates the death toll from COVID-19 as 50,032; Reuters give the figure as 49,646.
  - COVID-19 pandemic in England: Public Health England releases its 'Disparities in the risk and outcomes of COVID-19' report, finding that age, gender, health and ethnicity are significant factors in determining the outcome following COVID-19 infection.
  - 'Black Out Tuesday' is held to highlight racial injustice and anti-racism in response to the murder of George Floyd.
- 3 June
  - COVID-19 in the UK:
    - Home Secretary Priti Patel confirms plans to force almost all arrivals to the UK to self-isolate for 14 days from 8 June, and warns that failure to adhere to quarantine conditions in England could result in a £1,000 fine.
    - Business Secretary Alok Sharma, after sweating profusely during a statement to the Commons self-isolates at home, but tests negative for COVID-19 a day later.
    - A significant increase in sleep problems among the British population is reported by King's College London researchers, attributed to the ongoing effects of the lockdown.
- 4 June
  - COVID-19 pandemic in England: Transport Secretary Grant Shapps announces that wearing face coverings will be made compulsory on public transport in England from 15 June.
  - German prosecutors say that they believe Madeleine McCann is dead, and are investigating a 43-year-old German convicted sex offender, identified as Christian B, on suspicion of murder.
- 5 June – the BBC announces Tim Davie as its new Director-General, effective from 1 September 2020.
- 6 June
  - Thousands turn out for continued anti-racism protests across the UK in London, Manchester, Cardiff, Leicester, and Sheffield, following the murder of George Floyd, despite calls from Health Secretary Matt Hancock for people not to attend mass demonstrations in breach of lockdown rules.
  - Two sisters, Bibaa Henry and Nicole Smallman, are stabbed to death in London.
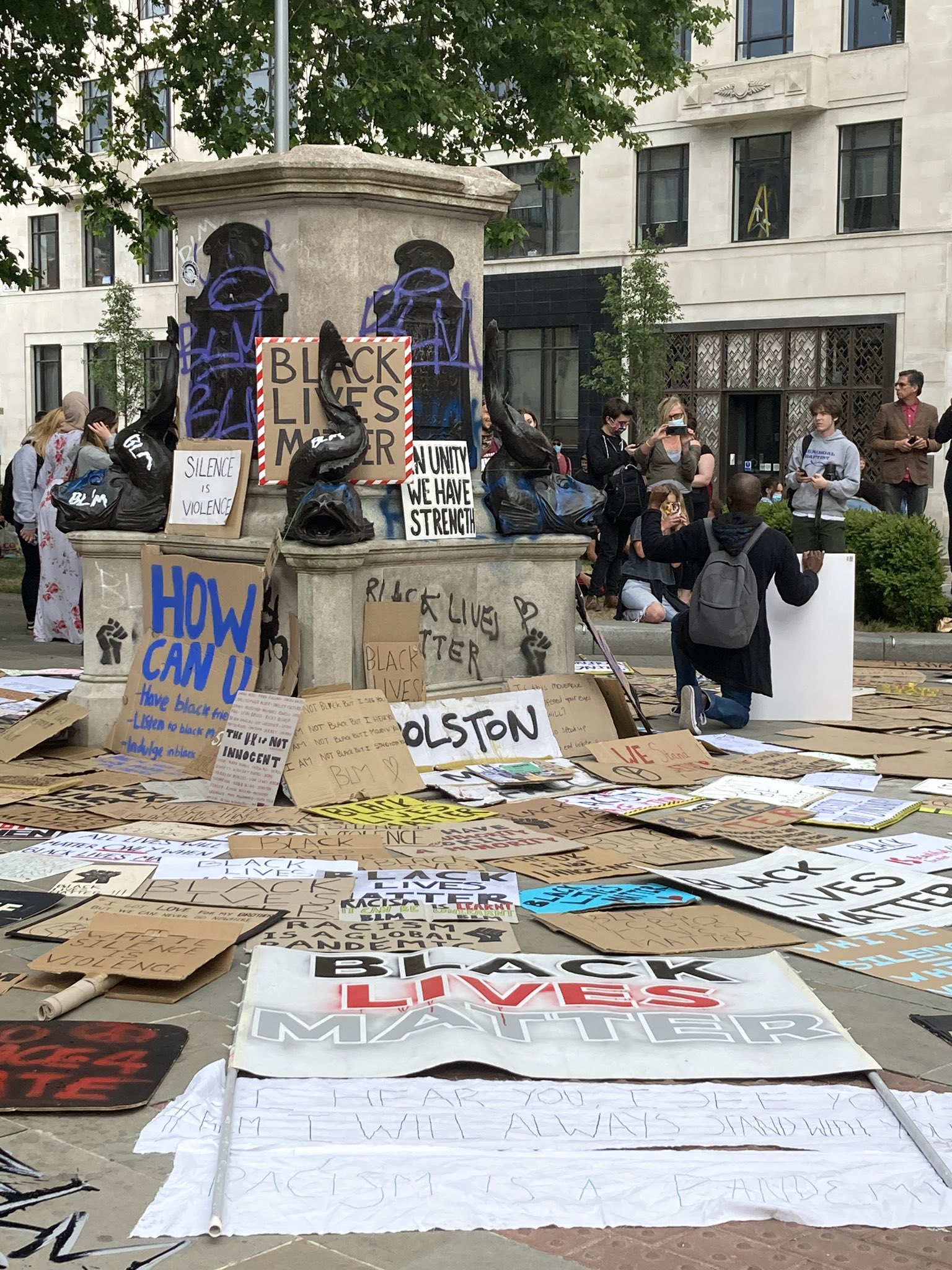
    Empty pedestal surrounded by placards the day after the Edward Colston statue was pulled down
- 7 June – a statue of 17th century merchant, slave trader, MP, and philanthropist Edward Colston is pulled down by anti-racism protesters in Bristol.
- 8 June
  - COVID-19 in the UK: BP announces plans to cut 10,000 jobs following a global drop in demand for oil.
  - Prime Minister Boris Johnson acknowledges the "undeniable feeling of injustice" motivating anti-racism protests caused by the murder of George Floyd, but urges the country to "work peacefully, lawfully" to defeat racism and discrimination, and condemns those who have flouted social distancing rules to attend them during a time of "national trial".
- 9 June
  - COVID-19 pandemic in England: Education Secretary Gavin Williamson drops plans for all primary school children in England to return to school before the end of the summer term.
  - COVID-19 in the UK: figures released by the Treasury show that 8.9 million workers are now covered by the Coronavirus Job Retention Scheme, more than a quarter of the British workforce, costing £19.6bn to date.
  - A statue of slave owner Robert Milligan is removed from outside the Museum of London Docklands, after mayor Sadiq Khan announces a review of all of London's statues and street names, saying any with links to slavery "should be taken down".
- 10 June – COVID-19 in the UK: the OECD says the British economy is likely to be the hardest-hit by COVID-19 among developed countries, with a projected economic slump of 11.5% in 2020.
- 11 June
  - COVID-19 pandemic in England: figures from the Department of Health show that in NHS England's NHS Test and Trace's first week of operation, 31,700 contacts were identified, of whom 26,900 (85%) were reached and asked to self-isolate.
  - COVID-19 in the UK: Centrica, the owner of British Gas, announces plans to cut 5,000 jobs by the end of 2020 to "arrest the decline" of the company.
- 12 June – COVID-19 in the UK: figures released by the Office for National Statistics show that the British economy shrunk by 20.4% in April, the largest monthly contraction on record.
- 13 June – large crowds, including far-right protesters, clash with police in central London, in response to recent anti-racism rallies and the tearing down of statues.
- 15 June
  - COVID-19 pandemic in England:
    - Long queues of shoppers are reported across England as all non-essential retailers are allowed to re-open.
    - Face coverings become mandatory on public transport in England.
  - A man who was pictured urinating next to a Parliament Square memorial dedicated to PC Keith Palmer, is sentenced to 14 days in prison for outraging public decency.
  - Boris Johnson announces plans to create a cross-government commission to examine racial inequality and the disparities experienced by minority ethnic groups in education, health and the criminal justice system.
  - A major search and rescue operation is launched as a F-15C Eagle military jet from the 48th Fighter Wing at RAF Lakenheath in Suffolk, crashes into the North Sea; the pilot is later found dead.
- 16 June
  - Murder of Arthur Labinjo-Hughes: a 6-year-old is beaten to death by his stepmother abetted by his father.
  - Boris Johnson announces the merging of the Department for International Development with the Foreign and Commonwealth Office to create the Foreign, Commonwealth and Development Office.
  - COVID-19 in the UK: the University of Oxford reports that a major trial of dexamethasone; a cheap, widely available corticosteroid medication, shows it can significantly reduce mortality in COVID-19 patients.
- 19 June
  - COVID-19 in the UK: the UK's COVID-19 alert level is reduced from four to three, meaning the virus remains in general circulation but transmission is no longer "high or rising exponentially."
  - The UK's national debt exceeds 100% of GDP for the first time since 1963.
- 23 June – COVID-19 pandemic in England: Prime Minister Boris Johnson announces an easing of the two-metre rule in England in favour of a '1-metre-plus' approach so two different households will be able to eat, drink or dine together from 4 July as long as they stick to physical-distancing guidelines; households will also be able to visit each other which includes staying overnight.
- 24 June – 22 police officers are injured and their vehicles damaged after breaking up an 'unlicensed music event' in Brixton; four people are arrested.
- 25 June
  - COVID-19 pandemic in England: a major incident is declared by Bournemouth, Christchurch and Poole Council after thousands of people arrive on beaches and other stretches of the Dorset coast, ignoring requests to stay away.
  - Rebecca Long-Bailey is sacked from the Shadow Cabinet after sharing an article on Twitter that 'contained an antisemitic conspiracy theory'.
  - The UK experiences its hottest day of the year so far, with temperatures reaching as high as 33.3 °C (92 °F).
  - Liverpool F.C. are confirmed as champions of 2019–20 Premier League after Manchester City lose at Chelsea, meaning that Liverpool now have an unassailable 23-point lead with 7 matches left to play; it is their first League Title for 30 years, 19th overall, and first Premier League title.

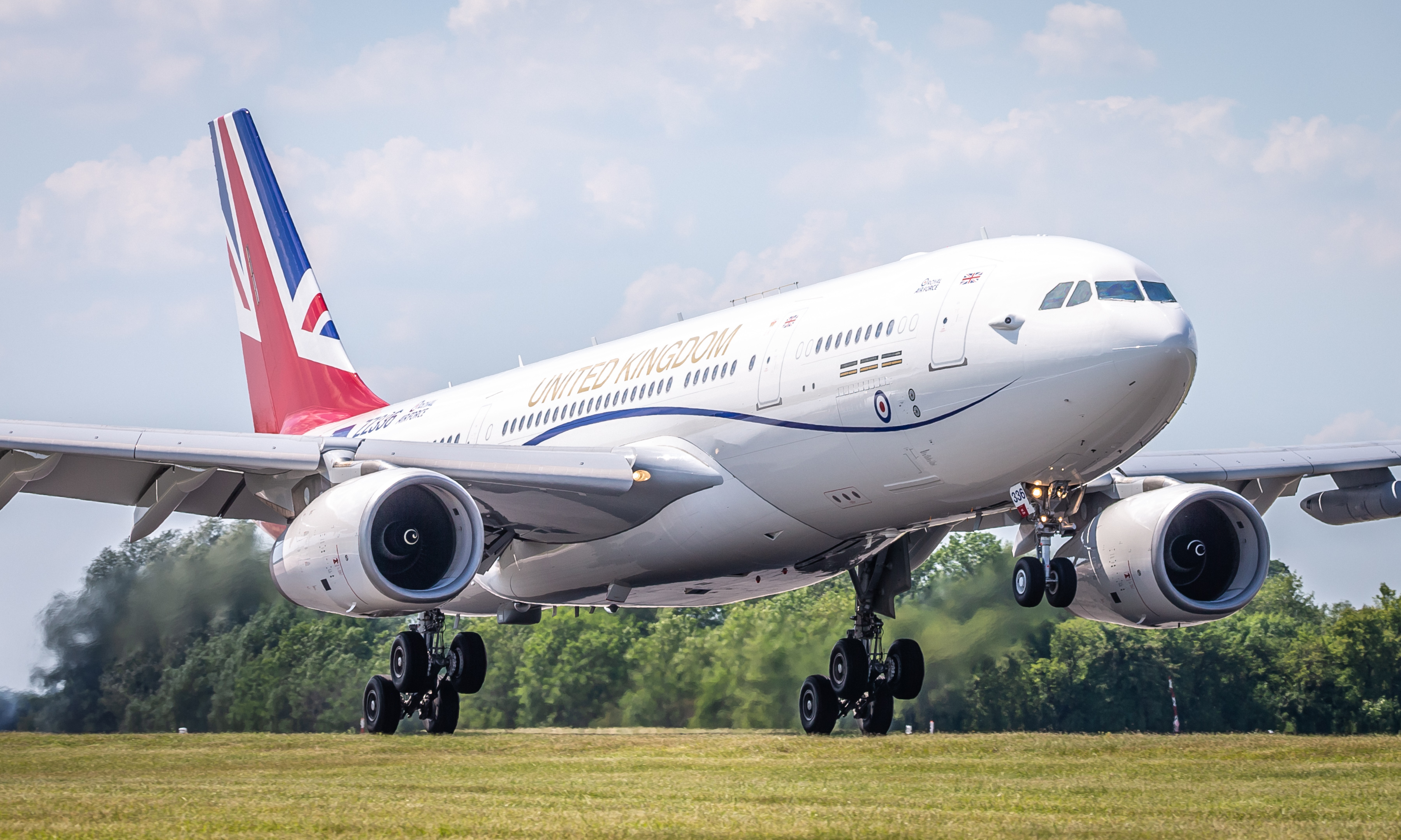
ZZ336 Vespina, the Royal Air Force's (RAF) VIP Voyager KC3 returns to RAF Brize Norton following completion of major servicing and her new 'Global Britain' gloss-white livery.

- 26 June
  - Following programmed mid-life major servicing and her new £900 million 'Global Britain' gloss-white livery, ZZ336 Vespina, the Royal Air Force's (RAF) VIP Voyager KC3 returns to her home base at RAF Brize Norton in Oxfordshire to continue her role as principal VIP aircraft for the British royal family, the Prime Minister, and senior members of the UK Government, whilst retaining her core military function as air-to-air refuelling tanker and air transport aircraft.
  - Jonty Bravery, 18, is jailed for a minimum term of 15 years after throwing a six-year-old boy off a 200 feet (61 m) balcony at London's Tate Modern gallery, leaving him with a bleed to the brain and life-changing injuries. A review found that, Bravery’s case involved, "appropriate efforts by professionals from across agencies to access assessment and treatment" but efforts, "were stymied due to the lack of services, placements and provisions that were suitable for his needs as an autistic young person with a coexisting conduct disorder diagnosis". Confined in Broadmoor, Bravery has continued to offend.
  - Shopping centre owner Intu, whose portfolio includes Merry Hill in the West Midlands and the Trafford Centre in Manchester, falls into administration after failing to secure an agreement with its creditors.
- 27 June – Kate Green is appointed by Keir Starmer as Shadow Secretary of State for Education, replacing Rebecca Long-Bailey.
- 29 June – COVID-19 pandemic in England: following a spike in COVID-19 cases in Leicester, the UK's first full local lockdown is introduced in the city, with non-essential retailers told to shut from the following day and schools told to close from 2 July.
- 30 June – The British government announces that rental e-scooters in the UK will be made legal from 4 July as an alternative which promotes social distancing compared to public mass transport, while privately owned e-scooters will remain illegal. This will be a rapid acceleration to a plan, first announced in March where scooters would be allowed in only four 'future transport zones': Portsmouth and Southampton, the West of England Combined Authority (WECA), Derby and Nottingham, and the West Midlands.

=== July ===
- 1 July
  - Prime Minister Boris Johnson denounces China's imposition of a controversial national security law on Hong Kong as a violation of its treaty with the UK, and announces plans to extend the British National (Overseas) rights of up to 3,000,000 Hong Kong residents born under British rule and open a route for them to become British citizens.
  - "No DSS" letting bans are ruled unlawful by a judge in York County Court.
- 2 July – The National Crime Agency (NCA) reports that a Europe-wide operation lasting over three months, which involved the interception of messages on EncroChat, has had the biggest impact on organised crime gangs it has ever seen. More than 800 arrests are reported, including major crime figures, with over two tonnes of drugs, several dozen guns and £54m in suspect cash being seized.
- 4 July – COVID-19 pandemic in England: A major easing of the lockdown in England – subject to modified physical distancing conditions – allows the reopening of bingo halls, cinemas, galleries, hairdressers, hotels, pubs, restaurants and theme parks.
- 6 July
  - The government announces a £1.57bn support package to help British theatres, galleries, museums and other arts/cultural venues during the economic downturn.
  - The UK is warned by China not to interfere with its new Hong Kong national security law and to stop "making irresponsible remarks on Hong Kong affairs."
  - Two paramedics are seriously injured during a welfare check in Wolverhampton, when the patient they were called to stabs them.
- 7 July – The British Government announces that it will resume arms sales to Saudi Arabia after a review finds "no clear risk" that they would be used in violation of international humanitarian law. Sales had been suspended in 2019 after a legal challenge by campaigners.
- 8 July – COVID-19 in the UK: Chancellor Rishi Sunak unveils a £30bn spending package aimed at mitigating the economic impact of the COVID-19 pandemic, including a temporary reduction in VAT for the hospitality sector, a scheme to pay firms £1,000 for each employee brought back from furlough, a scheme to get young people into employment, and a temporary rise in the stamp duty threshold.
- 9 July – COVID-19 in the UK: Boots and John Lewis announce job losses as a result of the pandemic, with Boots cutting 4,000 jobs, while John Lewis says it is shutting down eight of its stores, putting 1,300 jobs at risk.
- 10 July
  - COVID-19 pandemic in Scotland: Face coverings in shops and supermarkets become mandatory in Scotland.
  - Brexit: Plans are revealed for the emergency purchase of a 1.2m square foot "Mojo" site near Ashford, Kent, to be used for a new customs clearance centre for the 10,000 lorries crossing the English Channel to Calais every day.
- 11 July
  - COVID-19 pandemic in England: Further easing of the lockdown is introduced in England, as outdoor pools and water parks are allowed to reopen, while indoor gyms, pools and leisure centres can reopen from 25 July.
  - Two members of Animal Rebellion are arrested on suspicion for criminal damage after releasing red dye into Trafalgar Square fountains.
- 13 July
  - COVID-19 pandemic in England: The remainder of The Health Protection (Coronavirus, Restrictions) (No. 2) (England) Regulations 2020 comes into effect, allowing the re-opening of nail bars and salons, spas and beauty salons, massage parlours, tattoo parlours, and body and skin piercing services.
  - Work begins on the Viking Link, a 475-mile submarine power cable between England and Denmark, set to become the world's longest interconnector upon its completion in 2023.
- 14 July – British mobile providers are ordered to remove 5G equipment by Chinese firm Huawei from networks by 2027, over security fears.
- 15 July – The government announces that citizens of the EU living in England will be able to vote in the 2021 local elections postponed from 2020.
- 17 July
  - COVID-19 pandemic in England: Boris Johnson announces further easing of lockdown restrictions, with plans for a "significant return to normality" by Christmas. The new rules allow people to use public transport for non-essential journeys with immediate effect, while employers will have more discretion over their workplaces from 1 August. From 18 July, local authorities will have the power to enforce local lockdowns.
  - Princess Beatrice marries Edoardo Mapelli Mozzi at a private ceremony at the Royal Chapel of All Saints, having been delayed by the pandemic.
  - British Airways retires its fleet of 31 Boeing 747 aircraft, a move previously planned for 2024.
- 20 July
  - COVID-19 in the UK: Clinical trials of the vaccine being developed by the Jenner Institute and Oxford Vaccine Group at the University of Oxford on 1,077 patients show that it appears to be safe, and trains the immune system to produce COVID-19 antibodies.
  - Foreign Secretary Dominic Raab announces that the government will suspend its extradition treaty with Hong Kong "immediately and indefinitely" over the controversial national security law.
  - MPs vote against New Clause 11, which intended to protect and maintain standards on animal health and welfare, food safety and the environment in the UK in any post-Brexit trade deal, by 337 votes to 251.
  - MPs vote against New Clause 17, which intended to protect the NHS and publicly funded health and care services in other parts of the UK from any form of control from outside the UK.
- 21 July – The Intelligence and Security Committee publishes a long-delayed Russia report on Russian influence over British politics. It shows that the government and intelligence agencies both failed to prepare or conduct any proper assessment of Kremlin attempts to interfere with the 2016 Brexit referendum.
- 22 July – The UK and US agree to amend an "anomaly" that allowed Harry Dunn death suspect Anne Sacoolas to claim diplomatic immunity.
- 24 July – COVID-19 pandemic in England: Face coverings in shops and supermarkets become mandatory in England.
- 25 July
  - COVID-19 in the UK: Following a rise in COVID-19 cases in Spain, and concerns of a second wave, the British government and the governments of Scotland, Wales and Northern Ireland, announce that travellers returning from Spain will be required to quarantine for 14 days from 26 July.
  - COVID-19 pandemic in England:
    - Public Health England warns that being obese and overweight puts people at greater risk of severe illness or death as a result of COVID-19.
    - Indoor gyms, swimming pools and sports facilities in England reopen in the latest easing of the lockdown.
  - Police investigate grime artist Wiley over a series of antisemitic posts on his social media accounts, in which he describes Jewish people as "cowards" and "snakes" and compares them to the KKK. Home Secretary Priti Patel later probes Twitter and Instagram on their delay in removing the "abhorrent" posts.
- 27 July
  - COVID-19 in the UK: The UK's Chief Veterinary Officer confirms that SARS-CoV-2, the virus responsible for COVID-19, has been detected in a pet cat – the first known case of infection in an animal in the UK.
  - The government announces a ban on junk food advertising before 21:00 for the whole UK, along with restrictions in England on how foods high in fat and sugar can be promoted in-store, and new rules for displaying calories on menus.
- 29 July
  - COVID-19 in the UK:
    - The government sign a deal with GSK and Sanofi to provide 60 million doses of their potential COVID-19 vaccine. This follows three previous deals with other companies, taking the UK's potential vaccine availability to 250 million doses.
    - BBC Radio 1 presenter Greg James completes his 'Up Yours Corona' challenge by getting 193 countries in the world to tell the coronavirus to "do one" in one week.
- 30 July
  - Argos announces an end to its printed catalogue after almost 50 years of publication.
  - COVID-19 in the UK: The isolation period for those with COVID-19 symptoms is extended from seven to 10 days, in line with guidance from the World Health Organization.
  - Former Conservative MP Charlie Elphicke is found guilty of sexually assaulting two women, in 2007 and 2016. His wife Natalie Elphicke, Member of Parliament for Dover, says the verdict has ended their marriage.
  - With a series of opinion polls showing majority support for Scottish independence, Jackson Carlaw resigns as Leader of the Scottish Conservative and Unionist Party after only six months in the job.
- 31 July
  - COVID-19 pandemic in England: A further easing of the lockdown in England, due to begin on 1 August, is postponed for at least two weeks, because of an increase in SARS-CoV-2 cases.
  - The UK experiences its hottest day of the year so far, with temperatures of 37.8 °C (100.04 °F) recorded in London.
  - The UK records its first case of babesiosis, a rare tick-borne disease.

=== August ===
- 1 August
  - The BBC ends free television licensing for over-75s.
  - An unnamed Conservative MP and former minister, described as a man in his 50s, is arrested on suspicion of rape. As he has not had the whip withdrawn by the party, he can continue to represent them.
  - Arsenal defeat Chelsea 2–1 in the FA Cup Final to win the FA Cup for the 14th time.
- 6 August – Charlotte Dewar is named as chief executive of the Independent Press Standards Organisation, replacing Matt Tee.
- 7 August – The UK has its hottest August day in 17 years, with temperatures surpassing 36 °C in south-east England.
- 12 August
  - Stonehaven derailment: A train derailment kills three people near Stonehaven in Aberdeenshire, caused by heavy rain triggering a landslide.
  - Economy of the United Kingdom: The Office for National Statistics reports that the United Kingdom's gross domestic product (GDP) fell by 20.4% in the second quarter of 2020, the biggest quarterly decline since records began in 1955, and the worst economic figure of any G7 nation.
- 13 August – A-level results are published in England, Northern Ireland and Wales. This year's exams were cancelled due to the COVID-19 epidemic, so results were instead calculated using predictions submitted by teachers, called centre assessed grades (CAGs). The predictions were then moderated by the regulator, Ofqual, using an algorithm designed to eliminate grade inflation. This gave an overall pass rate 0.7% higher than in 2019, with more students being accepted for their first choice university course than in that year. Following concerns that 39% of results predicted by teachers in England were downgraded by the moderation process, Ofqual accuses some teachers of submitting "implausibly high" predictions. University data shows that 79% of the 2019 university intake did not achieve their predicted grades in exams.
- 16 August – The 2020 World Snooker Championship concludes with Ronnie O'Sullivan defeating Kyren Wilson 18–8 in the final to win his sixth world title.
- 17 August
  - In a reversal of the previous decision, the government announces that A-levels and GCSE grades in England will be based on unmoderated teacher predictions. Similar reversals also take place in Wales and Northern Ireland.
  - Banks Mining closes a major opencast coal site, Bradley mine, near Dipton, County Durham.
- 20 August
  - 22-year-old Hashem Abedi is jailed for a minimum of 55 years for his part in the Manchester Arena bombing.
  - A report by the Nuclear Decommissioning Authority advises that the Dounreay nuclear site will take until the year 2333 to be safe for reuse.
- 21 August – UK government debt is reported to be over £2 trillion for the first time. This also marks the first time the debt-to-GDP ratio has exceeded 100% since the 1960–61 financial year.
- 25 August – COVID-19 in the UK: Scientists identify the earliest person known to have been infected by the SARS-CoV-2 in the UK; a 75-year-old woman from Nottinghamshire, who tested positive on 21 February.
- 26 August – A disastrous fall in wheat production is reported due to extreme weather, with yields expected to be 40% lower, the worst British harvest in 40 years.
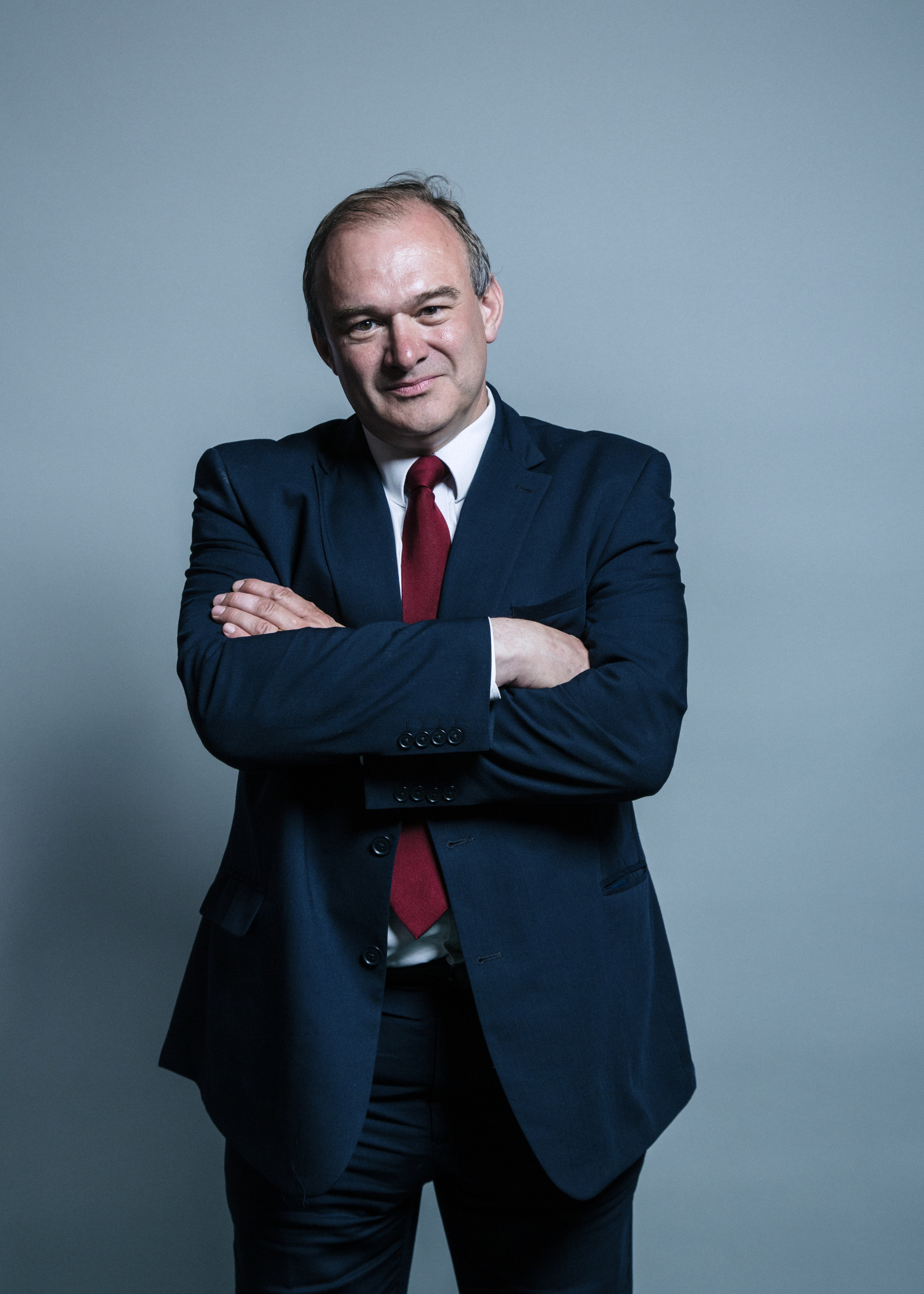
  Newly elected Liberal Democrat leader Ed Davey
- 27 August
  - 2020 Liberal Democrats leadership election: Sir Ed Davey is selected as the next leader of the party, with 63.5% of votes, compared to 36.5% for Layla Moran.
  - COVID-19 in the UK: 1,522 positive tests for SARS-CoV-2 are reported in a day – the highest daily figure since mid-June, after trending back upwards in recent weeks. This is partly due to the increasing number of people being tested.
- 29 August – Men's and women's FA Community Shield.

=== September ===
- 1 September – KPMG speculate that the British economy is unlikely to reach its pre-COVID level until early 2023.
- 1–4 September – The majority of schools in England, Wales and Northern Ireland reopen at full capacity, following those in Scotland that did so last month, ending almost half a year of closures due to the COVID-19 pandemic.
- 4 September
  - Construction work officially begins on the HS2 high-speed rail network.
  - Former Australian Prime Minister Tony Abbott is appointed as an unpaid trade adviser to the British government. The decision causes controversy over his past comments regarding women and LGBT people that have been labelled misogynistic and homophobic. A group of equality activists including Ian McKellen and Russell T Davies write an open letter against the appointment.
- 5 September – Extinction Rebellion activists block access to three printing presses owned by Rupert Murdoch, delaying the publication of several national newspapers. Police arrest 63 people.
- 6 September – COVID-19 in the UK: Almost 3,000 people in the UK test positive for SARS-CoV-2, a 50% increase in a single day and the highest daily total since May.
- 8 September
  - Sir Jonathan Jones, Head of the Government Legal Profession, resigns in protest against the government's reported plans to make changes to the Brexit withdrawal agreement, becoming the sixth senior civil servant to stand down in 2020.
  - Northern Ireland Secretary Brandon Lewis states the then unpublished Internal Market Bill could "break international law" in a "very specific and limited way".
- 9 September
  - 2020 Green Party of England and Wales leadership election: Siân Berry and Jonathan Bartley are re-elected as co-leaders of the Green Party.
  - The Internal Market Bill is presented to Parliament by the Government.
- 11 September – COVID-19 in the UK: The R number escalates to between 1.0 and 1.2 for the first time since March.
- 12 September – COVID-19 in the UK: Sir Mark Walport, former chief scientific adviser and member of SAGE, warns that the UK is "on the edge of losing control" as recorded cases of COVID-19 exceed 3,000 for the second day in a row.
- 14 September
  - COVID-19 in the UK: The new "rule of six" law comes into force. In England, unless one of the exceptions applies, such as team sports, sailing, angling, shooting, polo, dodgeball, floorball and goalball, the law provides authority to limit the number of persons in a gathering to a maximum of six. Equivalent rules also begin in Wales and Scotland, with some differences including exemptions for children under the ages of 11 and 12 respectively.
  - Conservative MP Rehman Chishti resigns as Prime Minister's Special Envoy for Freedom of Religion or Belief over the Government's Internal Market Bill, saying it unilaterally breaks the UK's legal commitments.
  - The Internal Market Bill clears its first hurdle in the Commons by 340 votes to 263.
- 15 September – Former Conservative MP Charlie Elphicke is jailed for two years for sexually assaulting two women, in 2007 and 2016.
- 16 September – The UK returns three antique bronze sculptures to India more than 40 years after they were stolen from a Hindu temple in Tamil Nadu. They were found in London after one was offered for sale in 2019.
- 18 September – COVID-19 in the UK: Prime Minister Boris Johnson states the UK is "now seeing a second wave" of COVID-19, with the R number now at 1.1 to 1.4 and cases rising around the country among all age groups.
- 20 September – COVID-19 in the UK: The SARS-CoV-2 genome later identified as part of the lineage of Variant of Concern 202012/01 – later dubbed the Alpha variant – is collected for the first time in a sample from Kent. The same genome is also identified for the second time in a sample from Greater London.
- 21 September – COVID-19 in the UK: The Joint Biosecurity Centre recommends that the COVID-19 alert level for the UK should be increased to Level 4, meaning that transmission of the virus is "high or rising exponentially".
- 22 September – COVID-19 in the UK: Michael Gove recommends that employees should work from home if able to do so.
- 24 September – COVID-19 in the UK: The UK records 6,634 new positive tests for SARS-CoV-2, the highest daily figure since mass testing began.
- 25 September – Sgt Matiu Ratana, a long serving police officer with the Metropolitan Police, is shot dead during an incident at a custody centre in Croydon, London.
- 29 September – MPs give their final backing to the Internal Market Bill, by 340 votes to 256. It now moves to the House of Lords.

=== October ===
- 1 October
  - After the British government ignored its early September demands to scrap parts of the Internal Market Bill by the end of the month, the European Commission launches legal action against the UK in response to the bill, which could be used to override sections of the Brexit divorce deal.
  - Margaret Ferrier, MP for Rutherglen and Hamilton West is suspended from the British parliamentary Scottish National Party after travelling from London to Scotland after being confirmed positive for COVID-19.
- 2 October
  - Cumbria County Council approves the first new deep coalmine for 30 years, voting 12–3 in favour. Opponents, which include Extinction Rebellion, argue that it contradicts the UK's pledge to be carbon neutral by 2050.
  - Plans for 40 new hospitals by 2030 are confirmed as part of a package worth £3.7 billion, with a further eight planned.
- 3 October – The wettest day on record occurs, with an average of 31.7 mm (1.24 in) of rain across the entire country.
- 4 October
  - COVID-19 in the UK:
    - A huge spike in new cases occurs from a backlog of unreported positive results, caused by an IT glitch. This results in the daily figure almost doubling on 3 October, and then nearly doubling again on 4 October.
    - The cumulative total number of COVID-19 cases in the UK exceeds half a million.
- 7 October – British Airways' last two Heathrow-based Boeing 747 planes depart from the airport on their final flight.
- 9 October
  - COVID-19 pandemic in England: The ONS reports that SARS-CoV-2 infections in England have "increased rapidly" with one in 240 people infected. Science advisers warn that hospital admissions are now "very close" to levels seen at the start of the crisis in early March.
  - COVID-19 in the UK: Chancellor Rishi Sunak announces that workers will get two-thirds of their wages paid for by the government if their employer is forced to shut because of the British government response to the COVID-19 pandemic.
- 11 October – At the 2020 Eifel Grand Prix, Lewis Hamilton equals Michael Schumacher's record of 91 for the most Formula One Grand Prix wins.
- 12 October – COVID-19 pandemic in England: Boris Johnson tells the Commons there will be a new three-tier alert system for local authorities in England – medium (tier 1), high (tier 2), and very high (tier 3).
- 13 October – Unemployment reaches 4.5 per cent, as redundancies are reported to be at their highest level since 2009.
- 16 October
  - Brexit: Boris Johnson contends that trade talks with the EU are effectively "over", and that the UK should "get ready" for arrangements with the EU to be "more like Australia's" from 1 January 2021.
  - COVID-19 pandemic in England: With SARS-CoV-2 infections in Greater Manchester increasing rapidly, and mayor Andy Burnham refusing to accept further restrictions, Boris Johnson warns he may "need to intervene" if new measures cannot be agreed.
- 20 October – The House of Lords rejects the Internal Market Bill, voting by 395 to 169 (a majority of 226) for a "regret" amendment.
- 23 October – COVID-19 pandemic in Scotland: Nicola Sturgeon confirms that Scotland is to enter a new five-level system of social distancing restrictions.
- 25 October – Nave Andromeda incident: An oil tanker south-east of the Isle of Wight, suspected to have been hijacked by Nigerian stowaways, is stormed by the Special Boat Service. Seven people believed to be Nigerians seeking British asylum are handed over to Hampshire Police.
- 29 October
  - COVID-19 pandemic in England: A major study by Imperial College London suggests that nearly 100,000 people are catching the virus every day in England, a figure now doubling every nine days. The study authors warn that "something has to change" at this "critical stage".
  - The Labour Party suspends former leader Jeremy Corbyn over his reaction to a report into anti-semitism.
- 31 October
  - COVID-19 pandemic in England: In a televised address, PM Boris Johnson announces a new four-week lockdown for England, to be enforced from 5 November until 2 December.
  - COVID-19 in the UK: The UK exceeds 1 million cases.

=== November ===
- 3 November – The UK terror threat level is raised from "substantial" to "severe", following recent Islamist attacks in France and Austria.
- 5 November
  - COVID-19 pandemic in England: A second lockdown comes into force in England in attempt to curb rising COVID-19 cases. The lockdown is scheduled to last four weeks.
  - COVID-19 in the UK: Chancellor Rishi Sunak extends the government's furlough scheme to the end of March 2021.
  - Dominic Chappell, the former owner of BHS, is sentenced to six years in jail for tax evasion.
- 7 November
  - COVID-19 in the UK: The Scottish Government and the British Government impose a ban on non-British citizens arriving from Denmark after a new SARS-CoV-2 variant, Cluster 5, being spread from mink to humans in mink farms.
  - Boris Johnson congratulates Joe Biden on being elected President of the United States, saying: "The US is our most important ally and I look forward to working closely together on our shared priorities, from climate change to trade and security."
- 9 November – The House of Lords votes by 433 to 165 to remove a section of the Internal Market Bill which allowed the government to break international law.
- 10 November
  - A record high level of redundancies is reported by the ONS, with about 314,000 people made redundant in the three months to September, more than during the peak of the Great Recession.
  - COVID-19 in the UK: Following the first successful phase III trial of a COVID-19 vaccine, Health Secretary Matt Hancock states that the NHS is ready to start providing doses in the UK "as fast as safely possible", with a mass roll-out expected "in the first part of next year".
- 11 November – COVID-19 in the UK: The number of deaths from COVID-19 in the UK exceeds 50,000.
- 13 November – Lee Cain, director of communications at Downing Street, announces his intention to stand down at the end of the year after reports of infighting in Number 10. Dominic Cummings, Boris Johnson's chief adviser and long-time "ally" to Cain, resigns shortly after.
- 14 November – The government commissions research into space-based solar power.
- 15 November
  - Lewis Hamilton wins a seventh Formula One title, equalling the record of Michael Schumacher.
  - COVID-19 in the UK: Boris Johnson is told to self-isolate by NHS Test and Trace after meeting MP Lee Anderson, who later tested positive for COVID-19. Downing Street says that the PM does not show any symptoms and will continue working from Number 10 whilst self-isolating.
- 16 November – COVID-19 in the UK: The government orders five million doses of a new COVID-19 vaccine by American biotech company Moderna, after a phase III trial shows it to have almost 95% efficacy.
- 17 November
  - Labour readmits Jeremy Corbyn, following his suspension over antisemitism on 29 October. Keir Starmer subsequently decides not to restore Corbyn's party whip.
  - A plan to ban the sale of new petrol and diesel cars from 2040 is brought forward to 2030 under Boris Johnson's 10-point plan to tackle climate change.
- 19 November
  - The government announces an extra £16.5 billion in defence spending over the next four years to "extend British influence".
  - Sources familiar with the Cabinet Office report that an inquiry into allegations of bullying by Home Secretary Priti Patel concluded that she broke the Ministerial Code.
  - The PlayStation 5 is released in the UK. Delivery problems are reported, due to huge demand.
- 20 November
  - Sir Alex Allan resigns as the Prime Minister's adviser on the Ministerial Code, after Johnson rejects his findings and expresses "full confidence" in Priti Patel.
  - COVID-19 in the UK: Matt Hancock announces that vaccination centres are being established across the UK in preparation for a SARS-CoV-2 vaccine that, if approved, could begin distribution in December.
- 21 November – A Whitehall source reports that Sir Alex Allan had resisted pressure from Boris Johnson to make his findings from the inquiry into Priti Patel more "palatable".
- 23 November
  - COVID-19 pandemic in England: Boris Johnson confirms that the lockdown in England will end on 2 December, with "tougher" three-tiered regional measures being introduced until March 2021.
  - COVID-19 in the UK: AstraZeneca's AZD1222 vaccine, developed in collaboration with the University of Oxford's Jenner Institute and the Oxford Vaccine Group, is shown to be 70% effective in protecting against COVID-19. The efficacy can be raised to 90% if an initial half dose is followed by a full dose a month later, based on interim data.
- 24 November
  - Harry Dunn's parents lose a High Court battle against the Foreign Office over whether their son's alleged killer, Anne Sacoolas, had diplomatic immunity at the time of the road traffic collision in 2019.
  - COVID-19 in the UK: The leaders of the three devolved nations of the UK agree with the prime minister on plans that will permit up to three households to form a "Christmas bubble" during a five-day period from 23 to 27 December, allowing them to mix in homes, places of worship, and outdoor spaces.
- 25 November
  - Rishi Sunak says that the "economic emergency" caused by COVID-19 has "only just begun" during his Spending Review announcement to the House of Commons, as figures from the Office for Budget Responsibility show that the economy is forecast to shrink by 11.3% in 2020, the UK's biggest economic decline in 300 years.
  - The Duchess of Sussex, Meghan Markle, reveals to The New York Times that she had a miscarriage in July 2020, which caused her "almost unbearable grief".
  - Baroness Sugg resigns from the Foreign Office, saying it is "fundamentally wrong" to cut the UK overseas aid budget.
- 26 November – Boris Johnson appoints Dan Rosenfield as his new Downing Street Chief of Staff, effective from 1 January 2021.
- 27 November – COVID-19 in England: Following three weeks of lockdown in England, the R number for SARS-CoV-2 in the UK is reported to have fallen to between 0.9 and 1 for the first time since mid-August.
- 30 November
  - Retail group Arcadia, whose operations include Topshop, Burton and Dorothy Perkins, goes into administration, threatening 13,000 jobs.
  - Protein folding, one of the biggest mysteries in biology, is solved by London-based AI company DeepMind.

=== December ===
- 1 December
  - COVID-19 pandemic in England: MPs vote 291–78 in favour of introducing England's new COVID-19 tier system with The Health Protection (Coronavirus, Restrictions) (All Tiers) (England) Regulations 2020, with 55 backbench Conservatives voting against the government, while another 16 abstain.
  - Debenhams stores are set to close with the loss of 12,000 jobs after attempts to find a buyer for the retailer fell through when JD Sports pulled out.
- 2 December – COVID-19 in the UK: The UK becomes the first country to approve the new Pfizer/BioNTech vaccine. 800,000 doses are planned for arrival in the coming days, with a further 40 million in 2021, enough to vaccinate 20 million people. The BBC reports that the jab is "the fastest vaccine to go from concept to reality, taking only 10 months to follow the same steps that normally span 10 years."
- 3 December
  - Four people are killed after a large explosion at a waste water treatment works in Avonmouth, Bristol.
  - The first batch of the Pfizer/BioNTech vaccine arrives in the UK, and is stored at an undisclosed location ready for distribution to hospitals and vaccination centres around the country.
- 4 December – Mayor of Liverpool Joe Anderson is arrested, along with four others, on suspicion of conspiracy to commit bribery and witness intimidation, related to the awarding of building contracts in the city.
- 7 December – MPs vote by 357 to 268, a majority of 89, to reinstate controversial sections of the Internal Market Bill linked to the Northern Ireland protocol, which the EU continues to oppose.
- 8 December
  - COVID-19 in the UK: A 90-year-old British woman, Margaret Keenan, becomes the first person in the world to receive the Pfizer/BioNTech COVID-19 jab as part of a mass vaccination programme. The injection of BNT162b2 is the first of 800,000 doses to be offered to people in the UK, with millions more expected to be ready by 31 December.
  - A group of former rugby players including Rugby World Cup winner Steve Thompson begin a claim against the game's authorities after being diagnosed with early signs of dementia, saying that repeated blows to the head from playing the sport are to blame.
- 12 December – Silverstone Circuit announces the renaming of the "International Pits Straight" the "Lewis Hamilton Straight" after he won his seventh world title and broke the record for most wins.
- 14 December
  - COVID-19 in the UK: Health Secretary Matt Hancock tells MPs that a new variant of COVID-19, the Alpha variant, has been identified that is spreading faster in some areas of the country. The variant shows changes to the spike protein which could make the virus more infectious.
  - Singer Jesy Nelson leaves the band Little Mix, saying that being in the group had taken a toll on her mental health and that she found the pressure of being in a girl group and living up to expectations very difficult.
  - Criteria on blood donations will focus on individual behaviours instead, and lift a ban on men who have sex with men in the last three months from donating blood. The changes will take effect in summer 2021.
- 16 December
  - COVID-19 in the UK: London is one of several areas in the South East of England placed into tier 3 of the country's COVID-19 tier system, following a sharp rise of infections in the capital.
  - The Supreme Court overrules the Court of Appeal ban on the development of a third runway at Heathrow Airport, allowing a planning application to go ahead.
- 18 December – COVID-19 in the UK: The New and Emerging Respiratory Virus Threats Advisory Group and the government are informed of evidence of increased transmissibility of the SARS-CoV-2 Alpha variant.
- 19 December
  - COVID-19 pandemic in England: Boris Johnson announces a new 'tier 4' lockdown for London and much of South East England from midnight, as the Alpha variant is identified with a 70% higher transmission rate.
  - COVID-19 pandemic in Scotland: Nicola Sturgeon announces "firm preventative action" – a ban on travel to the rest of the UK over the festive period; the relaxation of rules on meeting households indoors to only apply on Christmas Day; all of mainland Scotland moving into the toughest level four from 26 December; and schools returning later than originally planned after the Christmas holidays.
- 20 December
  - COVID-19 in the UK:
    - Austria, Belgium, Bulgaria, France, Germany, Ireland, Italy and the Netherlands announce the banning of flights from the UK, in response to SARS-CoV-2 Alpha variant.
    - A new record high daily case figure is reported, with 35,928 new infections, double the number of the previous Sunday.
    - France announces it will stop freight lorry movements from the UK for 48 hours because of the spread of SARS-CoV-2 Alpha variant in the UK.
- 21 December – COVID-19 in the UK: The number of countries halting travel from the UK exceeds 40.
- 22 December
  - COVID-19 in the UK:
    - The UK and France reach an agreement to reopen their border the following day, allowing freight drivers and EU citizens to travel between the two countries, subject to a recent negative COVID-19 test.
    - Tesco reintroduces a purchasing limit on some items, including eggs, rice, soap and toilet rolls to ensure there is not a shortage of products due to panic buying.
  - A new mineral, dark green in colour and named kernowite, is discovered in Cornwall.
- 23 December
  - COVID-19 in the UK:
    - A new highly infectious strain, originating from South Africa, is confirmed to be present in London and the North West of England.
    - Another record high daily case figure is reported, with 39,237 new infections.
  - COVID-19 pandemic in England: Tier 4 restrictions are announced for more areas in England from Boxing Day.
- 24 December
  - COVID-19 in the UK: The government suspends travel from South Africa.
  - Brexit: The UK and the European Union agree to a free trade agreement prior to the end of the transition period.
- 25 December
  - COVID-19 in the UK: The United States becomes the latest country to impose travel restrictions on the UK in response to SARS-CoV-2 Alpha variant, forcing all passengers travelling to the US to produce a negative COVID-19 test before being allowed to travel.
  - Following her traditional address to the nation, Channel 4 airs a deepfake video of the Queen's speech, to offer "a stark warning about the advanced technology that is enabling the proliferation of misinformation and fake news in a digital age."
  - YouTube star LadBaby becomes only the third act in UK chart history to achieve three consecutive Christmas number one singles with his novelty version of Journey's "Don't Stop Believin'".
- 26 December – Bryony Frost becomes the first female jockey to win the King George VI Chase at Kempton Park.
- 28 December
  - COVID-19 in the UK:
    - Another record high daily case figure is reported, with 41,385 new infections.
    - The number of patients with the virus in hospitals exceeds 20,000, surpassing the peak of the first wave in April.
- 29 December – COVID-19 in the UK: Another record high daily case figure is reported, with 53,135 new infections.
- 30 December
  - COVID-19 in the UK: The UK approves its second vaccine against COVID-19, developed by Oxford-AstraZeneca, with the first doses due to be given on 4 January 2021.
  - Brexit: The post-Brexit trade agreement with the EU is passed in the House of Commons by 521 votes to 73, a majority of 448.
- 31 December
  - COVID-19 in the UK: Another record high daily case figure is reported, with 55,892 new infections.
  - The government approves planning consent for the 2.4 GW Hornsea Project Three wind farm. Concerns are raised over the impact on bird colonies in the region.
  - Brexit: The transition period expires at 23:00 GMT as the UK completes its final separation from the EU, four and a half years after the referendum.

== Publications ==
- Douglas Stuart's Booker Prize-winning novel Shuggie Bain.

== Deaths ==
=== January ===
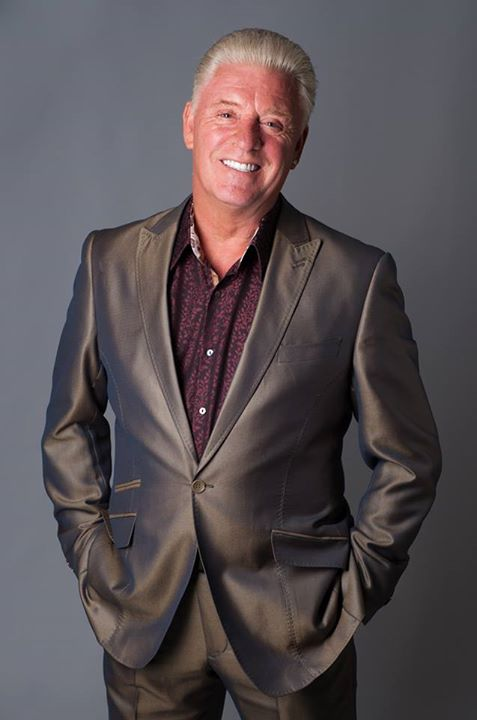
Derek Acorah in 2013

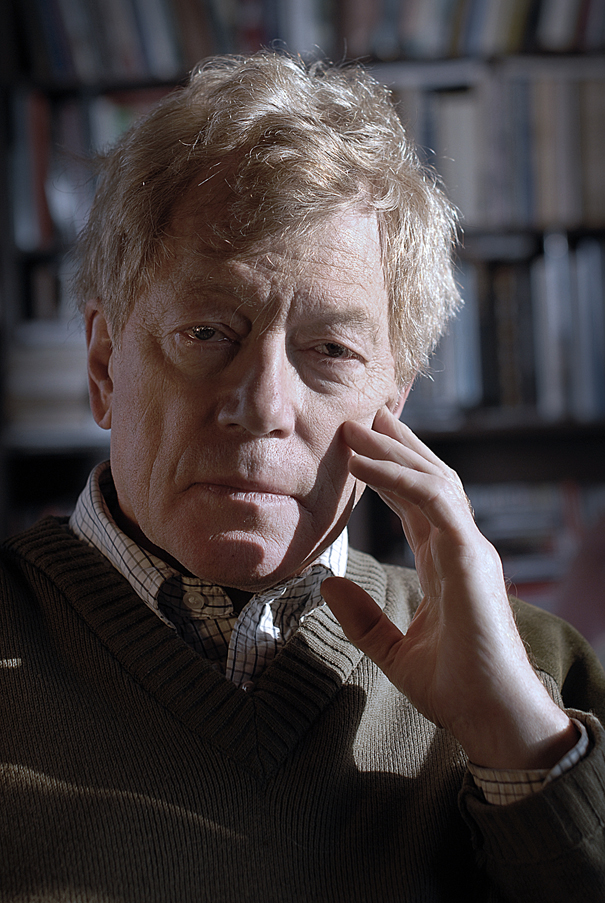
Roger Scruton

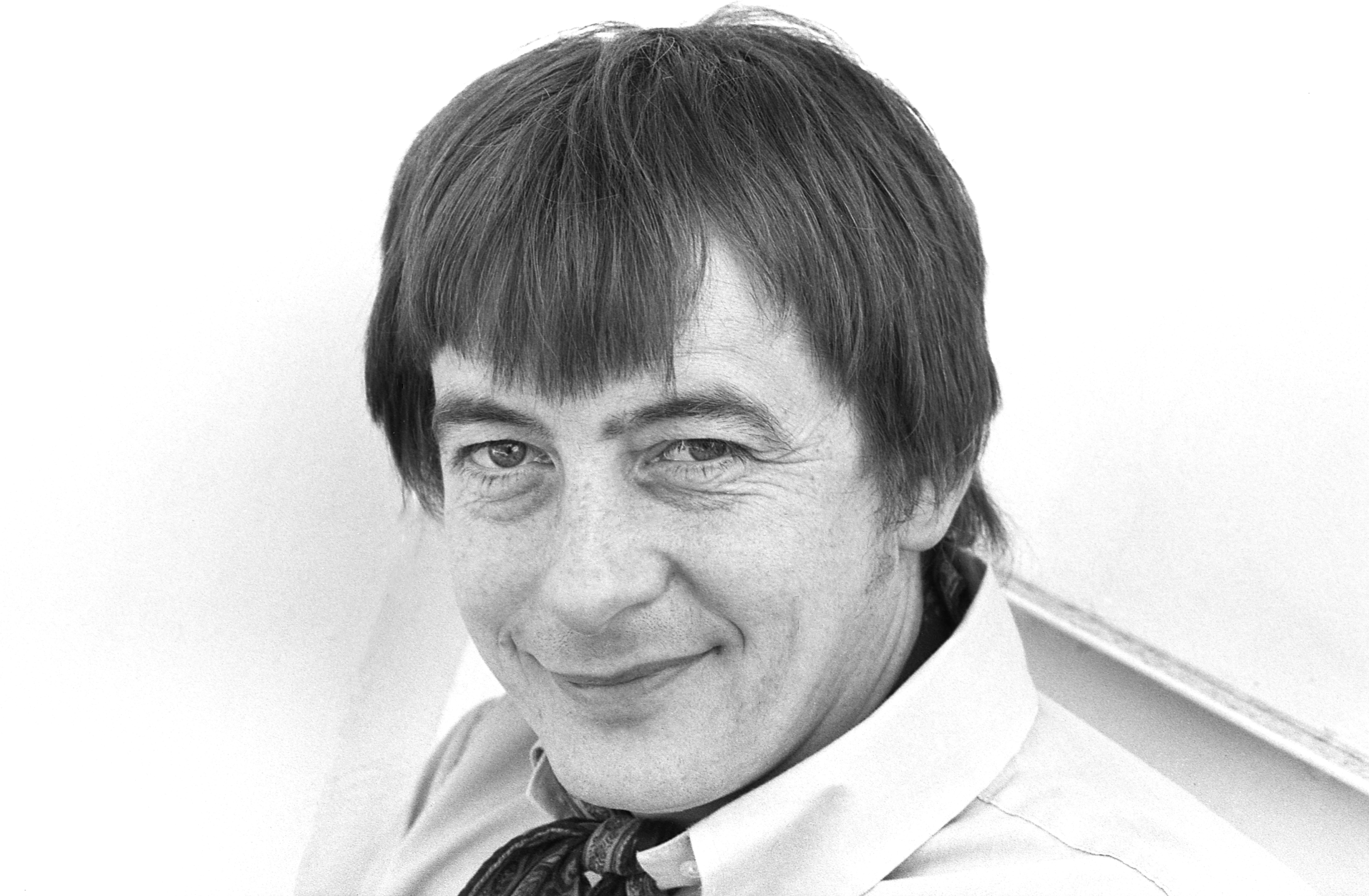
Derek Fowlds in 1974

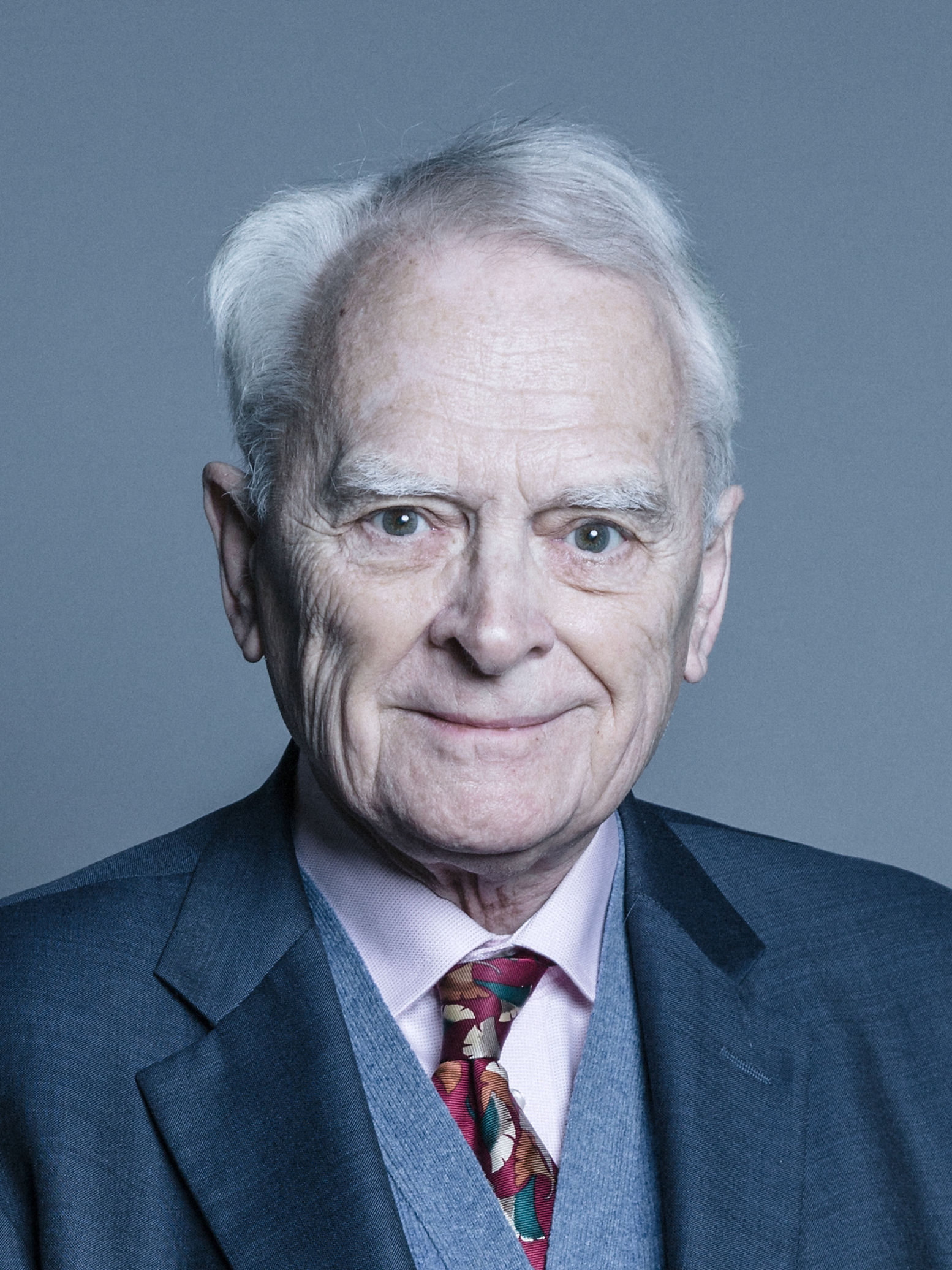
Robert Maclennan, Baron Maclennan of Rogart in 2018

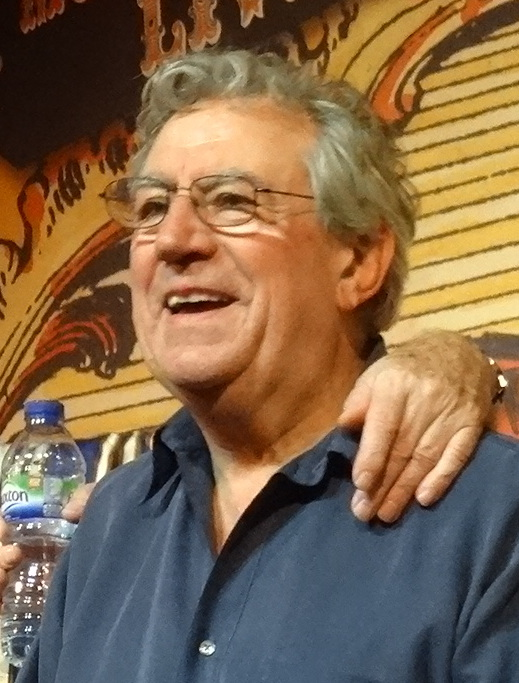
Terry Jones in 2014

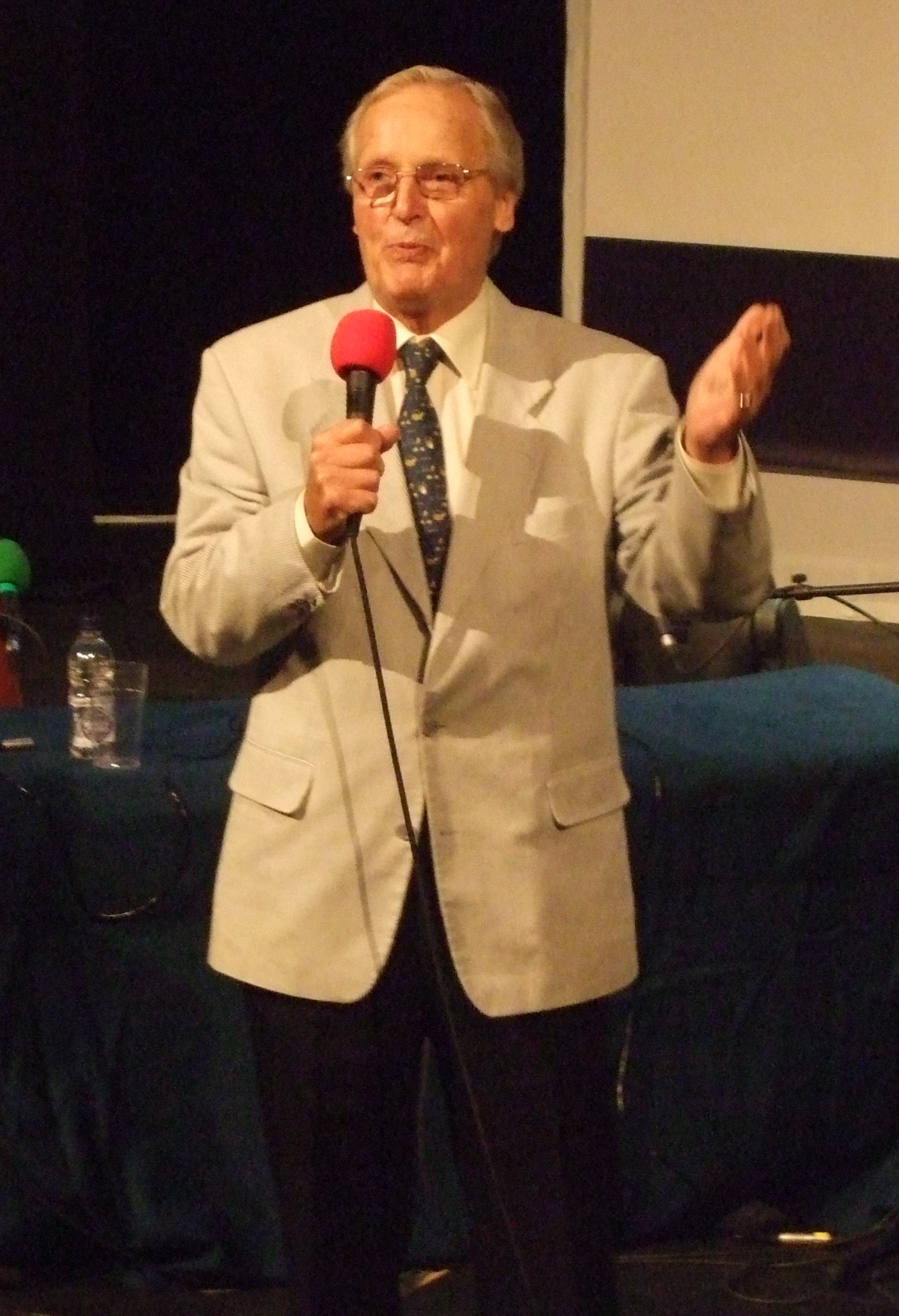
Nicholas Parsons in 2007

- 1 January
  - Chris Barker, 39, English footballer (Barnsley, Cardiff City, Southend United).
  - Alexander Frater, 82, travel writer and journalist.
- 3 January
  - Derek Acorah, 69, self-styled spiritual medium and television personality (Most Haunted, Derek Acorah's Ghost Towns).
  - Christopher Beeny, 78, actor (Upstairs, Downstairs, In Loving Memory, Last of the Summer Wine).
- 4 January
  - Guy Arnold, 87, explorer and writer.
  - Sir Jack Baldwin, 81, chemist.
- 5 January
  - James Barber, 79, biochemist.
  - Colin Howson, 74–75, philosopher.
  - Sir Michael Stear, 81, RAF air chief marshal.
- 6 January
  - Ray Byrom, 85, English footballer (Accrington Stanley, Bradford (Park Avenue)).
  - Danny Masterton, 65, Scottish footballer (Ayr United, Clyde).
  - James Mehaffey, 88, Northern Irish Anglican prelate, Bishop of Derry and Raphoe (1980–2002).
- 7 January
  - Gerald Bowden, 84, politician, MP (1983–1992).
  - Stephen Clements, 47, radio personality (BBC Radio Ulster).
  - Colin Seeley, 84, motorcycle engineer and racer.
- 8 January
  - Peter T. Kirstein, 86, German-born computer scientist.
  - David Montgomery, 2nd Viscount Montgomery of Alamein, 91, peer and businessman, member of the House of Lords (1976–1999, 2005–2015).
- 9 January
  - Tom Alexander, 85, musician (The Alexander Brothers).
  - John Brownjohn, 90, literary translator.
  - Jimmy Shields, 88, Northern Irish footballer (Southampton, Headington United, national team).
- 10 January
  - Alun Gwynne Jones, Baron Chalfont, 100, politician, Minister of State for Foreign Affairs (1964–1970) and member of the House of Lords (1964–2015).
  - Roddy Lumsden, 53, poet.
- 12 January
  - Jackie Brown, 84, Scottish boxer, Commonwealth Games gold medallist (1958), British and Commonwealth flyweight champion (1962–1963).
  - Brian Clifton, 85, English footballer (Southampton, Grimsby Town)
  - Tony Garnett, 83, television and film producer (Kes, Earth Girls Are Easy).
  - Sir Roger Scruton, 75, philosopher and writer (The Meaning of Conservatism, Sexual Desire, The Aesthetics of Music, Why Beauty Matters, How to Be a Conservative).
- 13 January
  - Edmund Ironside, 2nd Baron Ironside, 95, peer, naval officer and businessman.
  - Hylda Sims, 87, English folk musician and poet.
  - Gerald Weisfeld, 79, retailer, founder of What Every Woman Wants.
- 15 January
  - Bobby Brown, 96, Scottish Hall of Fame football player (Rangers, Queen's Park) and manager (national team).
  - David Smeeton, 83, journalist.
  - Michael Wheeler, 84, sprinter, Olympic bronze medalist (1956).
- 16 January
  - Alan Pattillo, 90, television director (Supercar, Thunderbirds), writer and editor (All Quiet on the Western Front).
  - Christopher Tolkien, 95, academic and editor (The Silmarillion, The History of Middle-earth).
  - Barry Tuckwell, 86, Australia-born French horn player, conductor, and past principal French horn of the London Symphony Orchestra
- 17 January
  - Derek Fowlds, 82, actor (Yes Minister, Yes Prime Minister, Heartbeat).
  - John Klyberg, 88, priest, Bishop of Fulham (1985–1996).
  - Steve Rayner, 66, social scientist.
- 18 January
  - Peter Hobday, 82, journalist and news presenter (Today, The Money Programme, Newsnight, World at One).
  - Robert Maclennan, Baron Maclennan of Rogart, 83, politician, MP (1966–2001), Leader of the Social Democratic Party (1987–1988) and President of the Liberal Democrats (1995–1998).
- 20 January – Mick Vinter, 65, English footballer (Notts County, Wrexham, Oxford United).
- 21 January – Terry Jones, 77, actor (Monty Python).
- 23 January
  - Robert Archibald, 39, basketball player (Memphis Grizzlies, Toronto Raptors, Club Joventut Badalona).
  - Tom Daley, 86, footballer (Grimsby Town, Huddersfield Town, Peterborough United)
- 24 January
  - David Adam, 83, priest and author.
  - Seamus Mallon, 83, Northern Irish Gaelic footballer (Middletown) and politician, Deputy First Minister of Northern Ireland (1998–2001).
- 25 January
  - Meredith Etherington-Smith, 73, fashion journalist.
  - Jordan Sinnott, 25, English footballer (Altrincham, FC Halifax Town), victim of assault.
- 27 January – Derek Edwards, British rugby league player (Castleford, national team).
- 28 January
  - Paul Farnes, 101, RAF pilot and World War II veteran, last surviving ace of the Battle of Britain.
  - Nicholas Parsons, 96, actor (Four Feather Falls), radio and television presenter (Just a Minute, Sale of the Century), Rector of the University of St Andrews (1988–1991).
  - Peter Rogers, 72, businessman (Babcock International).
- 30 January
  - Dale Jasper, 56, English footballer (Chelsea, Brighton, Crewe Alexandra).
  - William Mitchell, 94, sculptor.
- 31 January
  - Donald J. West, 95, psychiatrist and parapsychologist.
  - Andree Melly, 87, actress, (The Brides of Dracula)

=== February ===
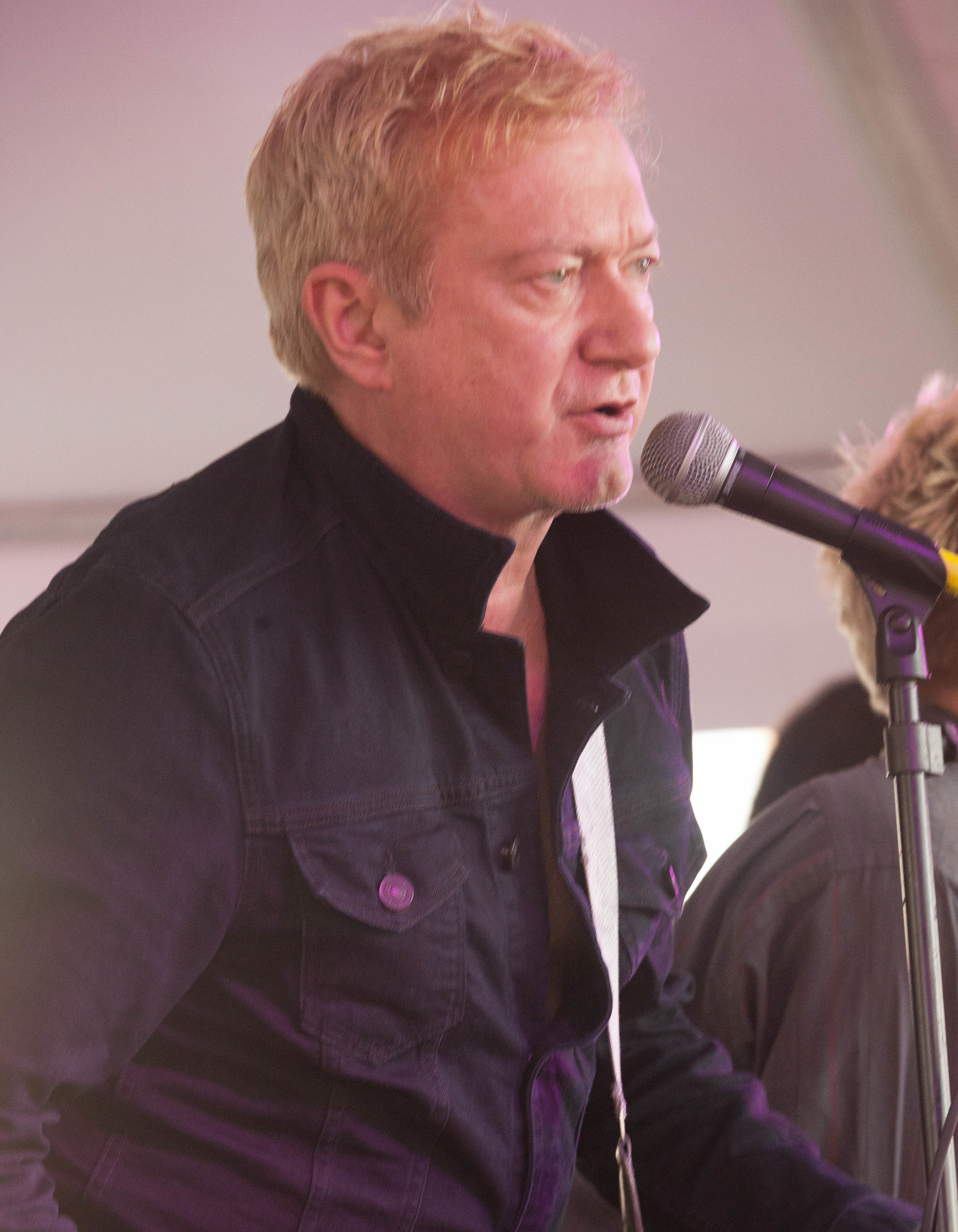
Andy Gill in 2015

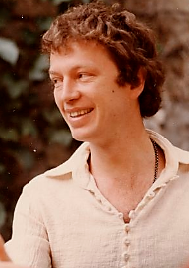
Terry Hands in 1972

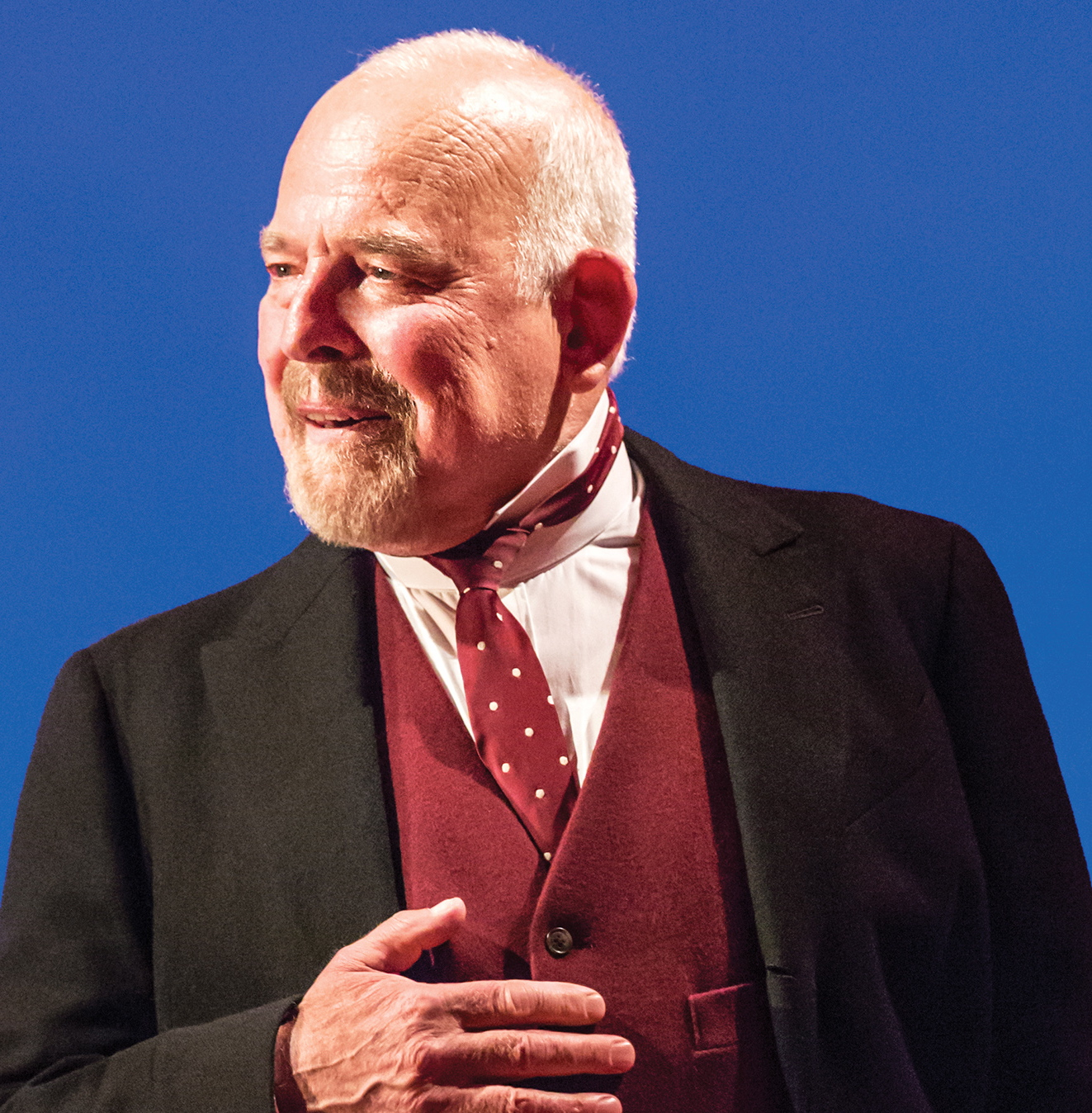
John Shrapnel

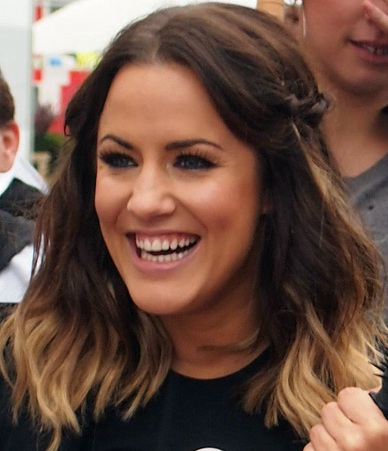
Caroline Flack in 2012

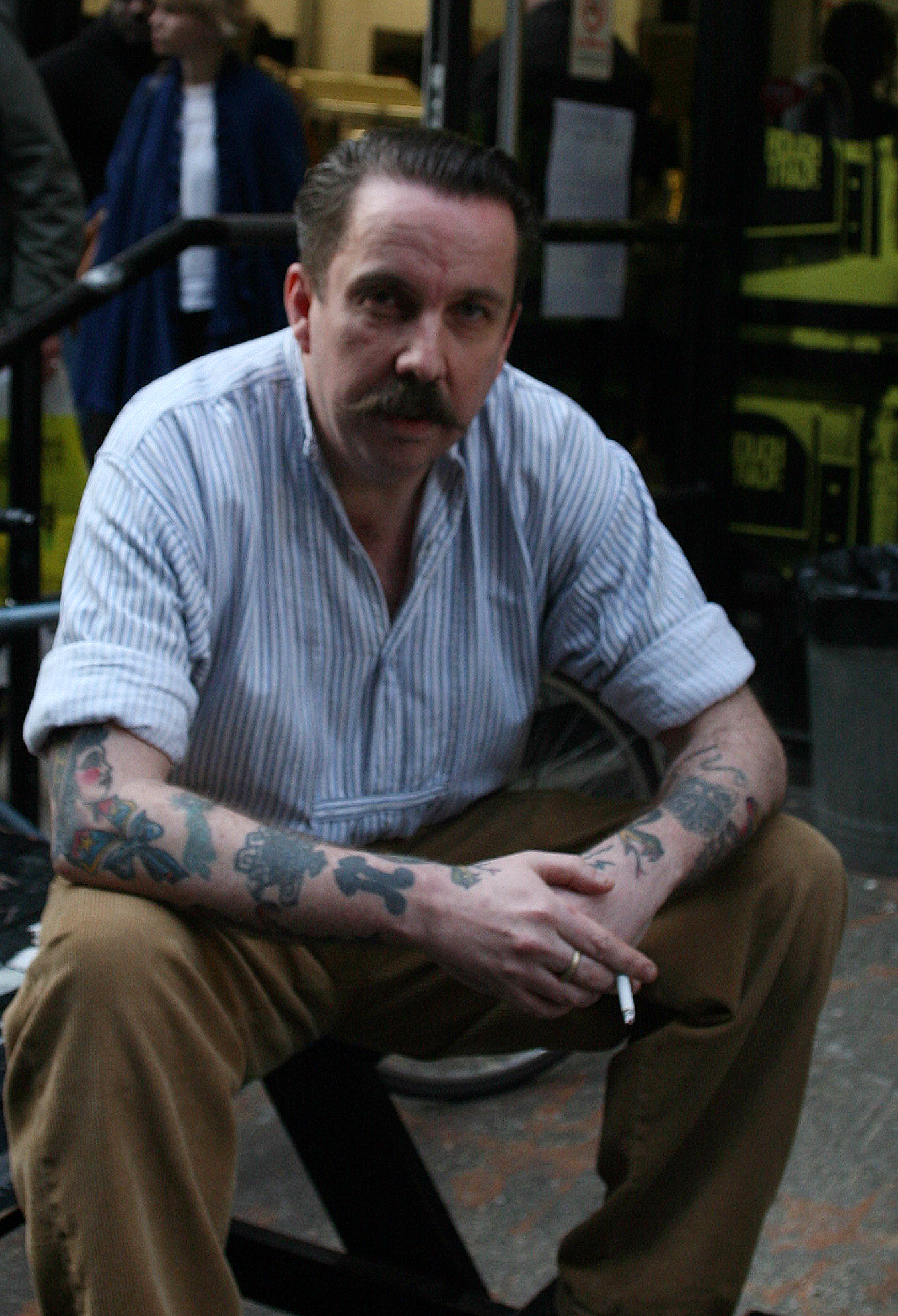
Andrew Weatherall in 2009

- 1 February
  - Andy Gill, 64, post-punk guitarist (Gang of Four) and record producer.
  - Charles Wood, 87, screenwriter (The Knack ...and How to Get It, Help!, Iris).
- 2 February
  - Mad Mike Hoare, 100, mercenary leader (Congo Crisis, Operation Angela).
  - David Lacy-Scott, 99, English cricketer (Cambridge University, Kent).
  - Robert Sheldon, Baron Sheldon, 96, politician, MP (1964–2001) and member of the House of Lords (2001–2015).
- 3 February
  - Robert Alner, 76, Cheltenham Gold Cup-winning racehorse trainer.
  - John Grant, 70, science fiction writer.
  - Roy Walton, 87, card magician.
- 4 February
  - Terry Hands, 79, theatre director (Royal Shakespeare Company).
  - William Oxley, 80, poet and philosopher.
  - Teodor Shanin, 89, Lithuanian-born sociologist.
- 5 February – Gyurme Dorje, 69, Buddhist philosopher.
- 6 February
  - Raphaël Coleman, 25, actor (Nanny McPhee, It's Alive, The Fourth Kind).
  - Jimmy Moran, 84, Scottish footballer (Norwich City, Northampton Town, Workington).
- 7 February
  - Paul Koralek, 86, Austrian-born architect.
  - Brian Pilkington, 86, English footballer (Burnley, Bolton Wanderers, Barrow).
- 9 February
  - Sir John Cadogan, 89, organic chemist.
  - Peter McCall, 83, English footballer, (Bristol City, Oldham Athletic)
  - Donald Russell, 99, classicist and academic.
- 10 February – Patrick Jordan, 96, actor (The Angry Hills, The Marked One, Star Wars). (death announced on this date)
- 11 February – Sammy McCarthy, 88, boxer.
- 12 February
  - Sir Michael Berridge, 81, Zimbabwean-born biochemist.
  - Hamish Milne, 80, pianist.
- 13 February – Zara Steiner, 91, American-born historian and academic.
- 14 February
  - Jimmy Conway, 73, footballer (Republic of Ireland, Fulham, Manchester City)
  - Brian Jackson, 86, English footballer (Liverpool, Port Vale).
  - Godfrey O'Donnell, 80, Northern Irish priest, president of the Irish Council of Churches (2012–2014).
  - John Shrapnel, 77, actor (Gladiator, Troy, 101 Dalmatians).
- 15 February – Caroline Flack, 40, radio and television presenter.
- 16 February
  - Pearl Carr, 99, singer (Pearl Carr & Teddy Johnson).
  - Frances Cuka, 83, actress (Scrooge, The Watcher in the Woods, Snow White: A Tale of Terror).
  - Harry Gregg, 87, Northern Irish footballer (Manchester United), Munich air disaster survivor.
- 17 February – Andrew Weatherall, 56, music producer (Screamadelica), disc jockey and musician (The Sabres of Paradise, Two Lone Swordsmen).
- 19 February
  - Heather Couper, 70, astronomer and broadcaster, President of the British Astronomical Association (1984–1986).
  - Wilfred De'Ath, 82, journalist (The Oldie).
- 20 February
  - Malcolm Pyke, 81, English footballer (West Ham United, Crystal Palace, Dartford).
  - Jimmy Wheeler, 86, English footballer (Reading) and football manager (Bradford City).
- 22 February – Simon Warr, 65, broadcaster (BBC) and actor (That'll Teach 'Em).
- 24 February – Bruce George, 77, politician, MP (1974–2010).
- 26 February – Michael Medwin, 96, actor (Shoestring, Scrooge, The Army Game).
- 27 February – Natasha Reddican, 31, television producer (The Jeremy Kyle Show)
- 28 February – Freeman Dyson, 96, British-born physicist and mathematician (Dyson's transform, Rank of a partition, Dyson series).
- 29 February
  - Fiona MacCarthy, 80, journalist and biographer.
  - Ceri Morgan, 72, darts player.

=== March ===
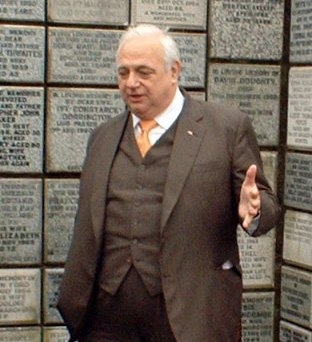
Roy Hudd in 2005

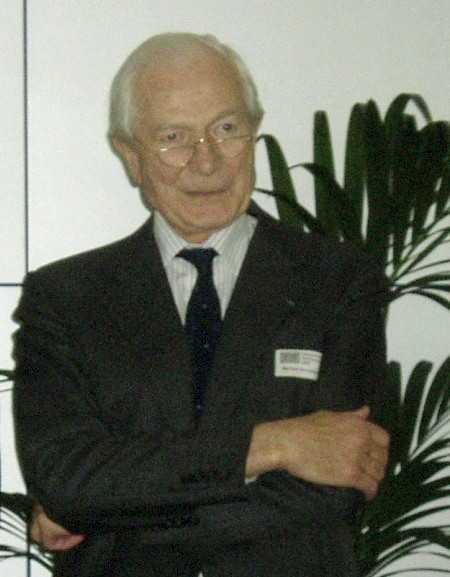
Michael Broadbent in 2005

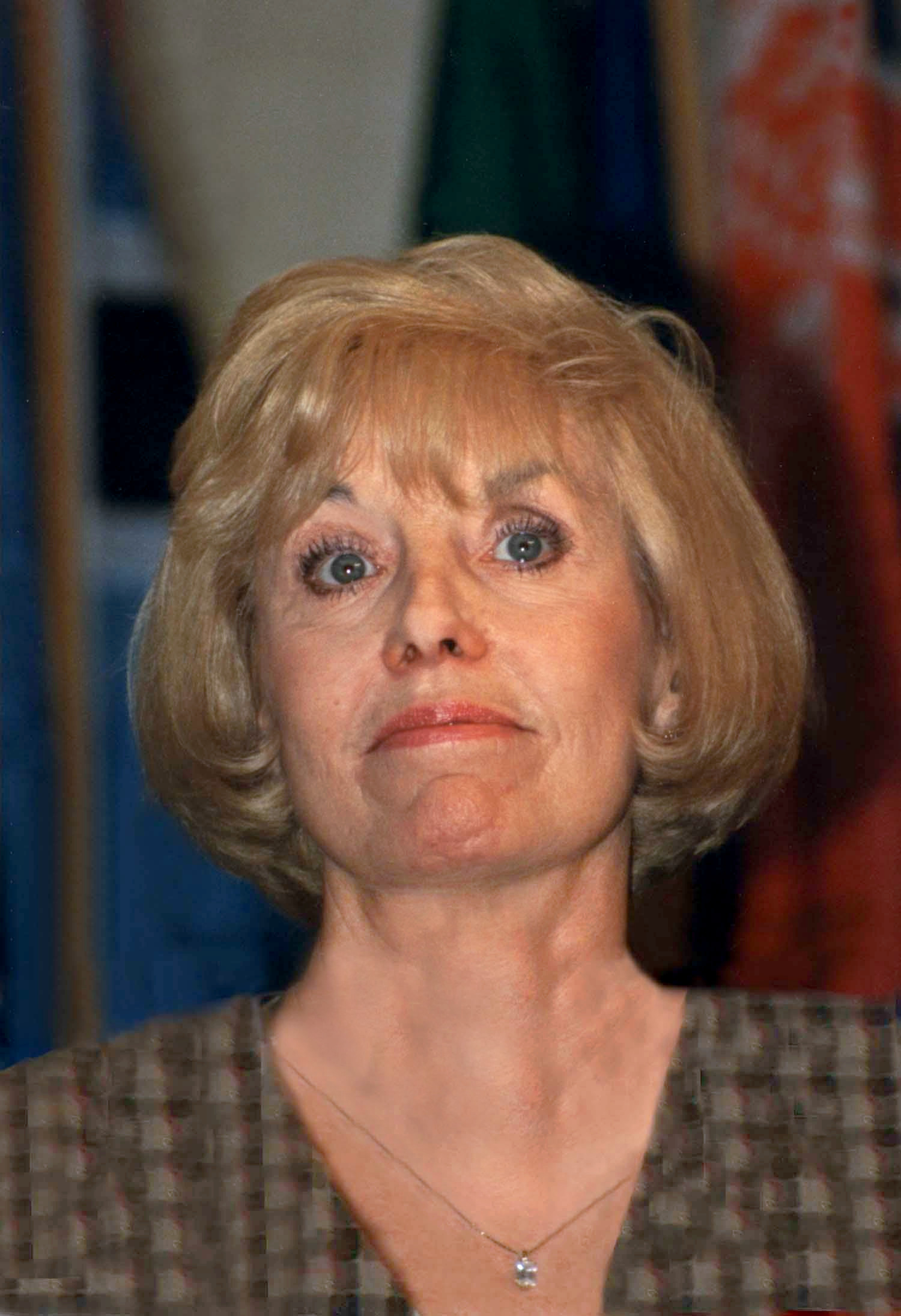
Betty Williams in 1996

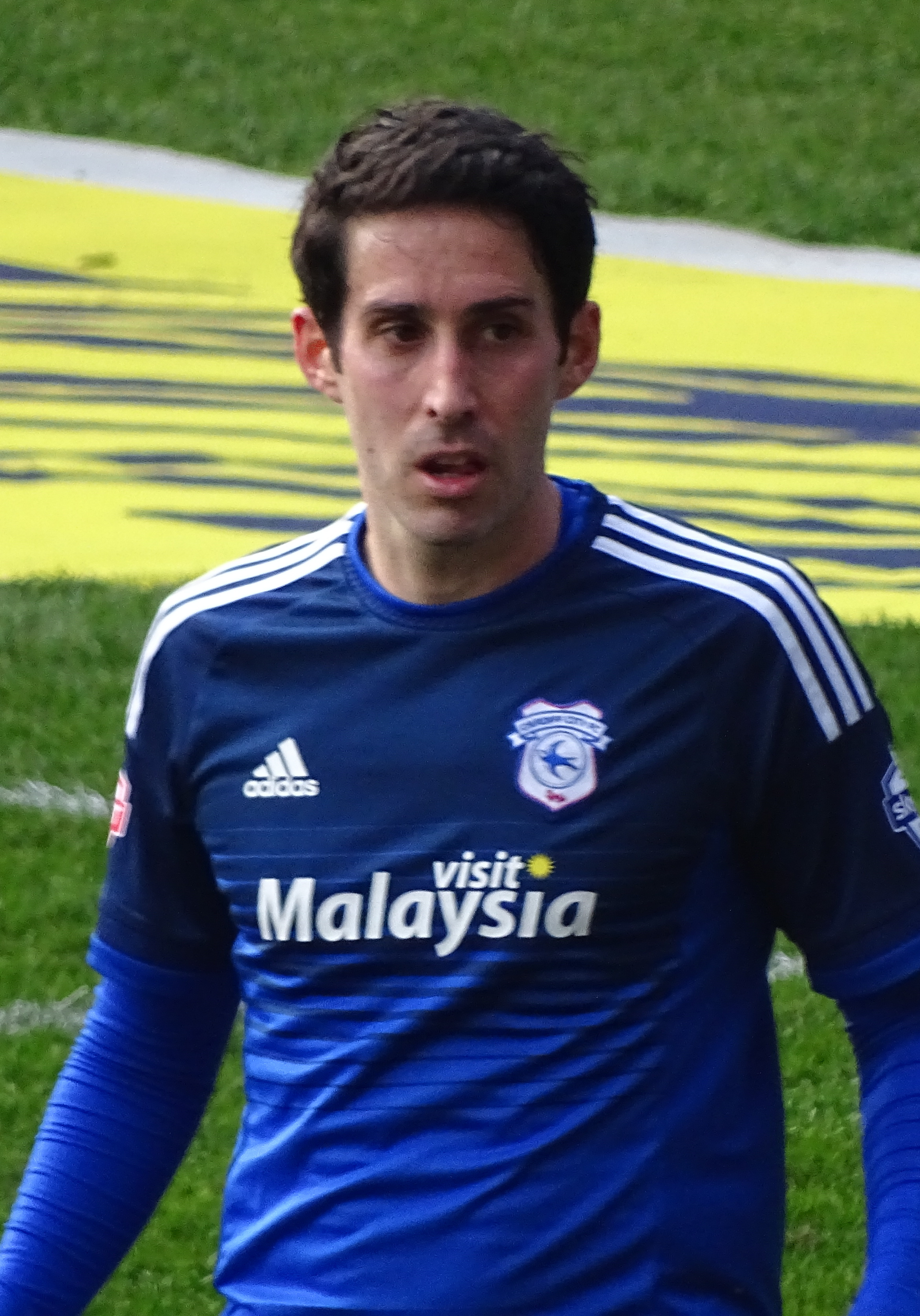
Peter Whittingham in 2016

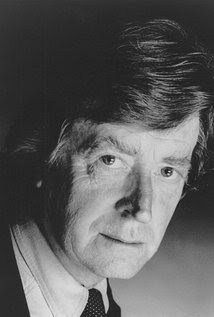
David Collings

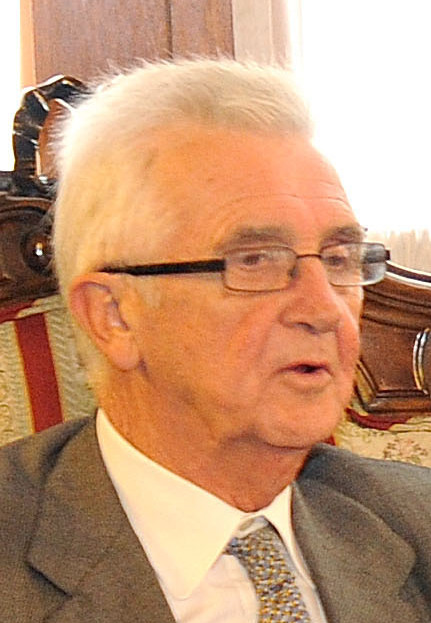
Tristan Garel-Jones in 2011

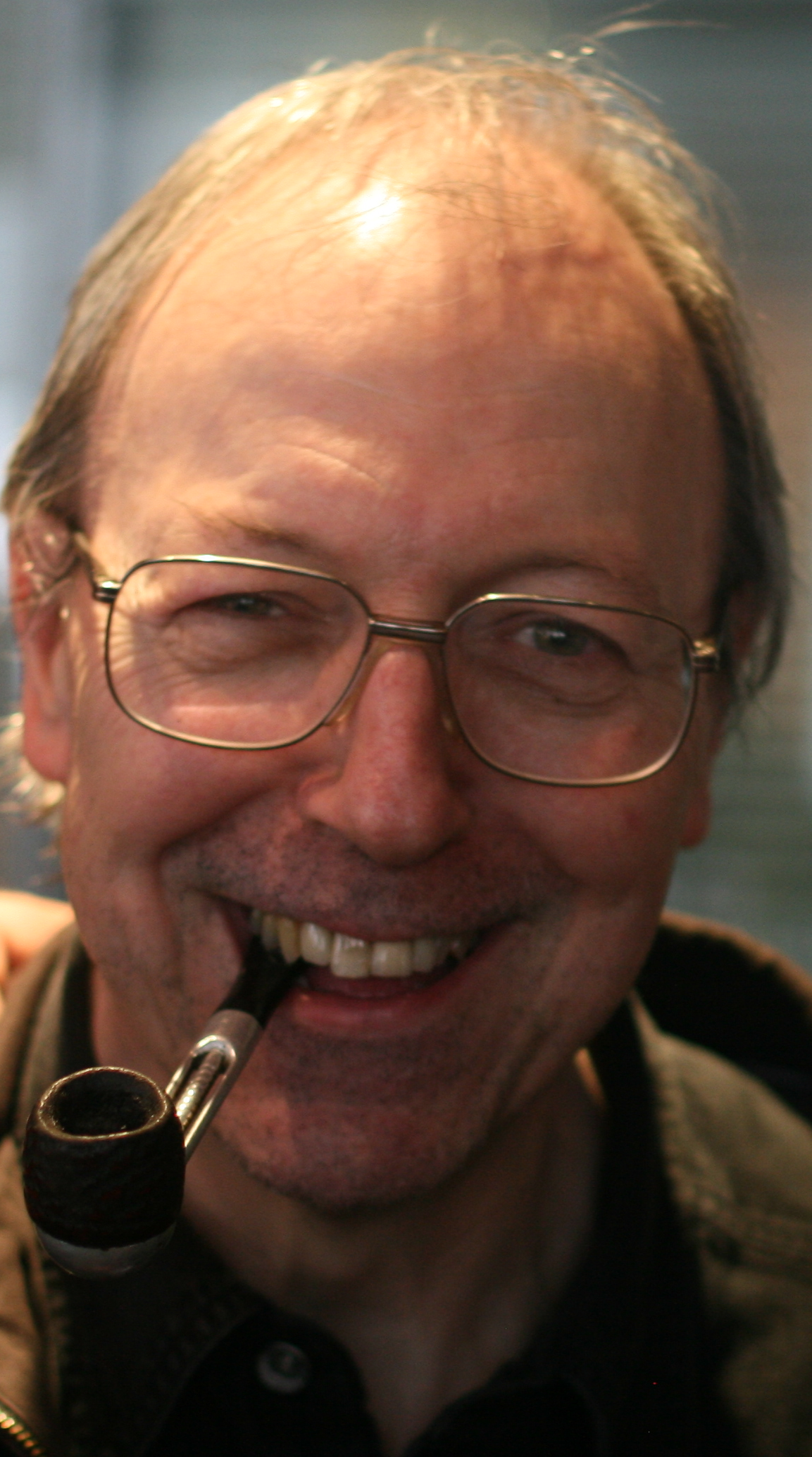
Jack Schofield in 2009

- 2 March – Bahamian Bounty, 26, racehorse and sire. (death announced on this date)
- 4 March – David Bentley, 84, Anglican prelate, Bishop of Gloucester (1993–2003).
- 6 March
  - Peter Smith, 76, Roman Catholic prelate, Bishop of East Anglia (1995–2001), Archbishop of Cardiff (2001–2010) and Southwark (2010–2019).
  - Patrick Wright, Baron Wright of Richmond, 88, diplomat and life peer.
- 7 March
  - John Manners, 105, Royal Navy officer and cricketer (Hampshire, Marylebone).
  - Matthew Watkins, 41, Welsh rugby union player (Newport, Scarlets, national team), pelvic cancer.
- 8 March
  - Wayne Bridges, 83, professional wrestler (ASW).
  - Ernest Davies, 93, politician, MP (1966–1970).
- 9 March
  - Richard K. Guy, 103, mathematician (Winning Ways for your Mathematical Plays, strong law of small numbers).
  - George Strachan, 87, Scottish cricketer (national team).
- 11 March
  - Michel Roux, 78, French-born chef and restaurateur (Le Gavroche, The Waterside Inn), idiopathic pulmonary fibrosis.
  - Dave Souter, 79, Scottish footballer (Clyde, Dundee).
- 12 March
  - Sir John Chalstrey, 88, surgeon and civic leader, Lord Mayor of London (1995–1996).
  - Alexander Gordon, 7th Marquess of Aberdeen and Temair, 64, Scottish peer.
  - Sir John Lyons, 87, linguist.
  - Pete Mitchell, 61, English radio DJ and presenter (BBC Radio 2, Virgin Radio).
- 14 March – Genesis P-Orridge, 70, musician (Throbbing Gristle, Psychic TV) and performance artist (COUM Transmissions).
- 15 March – Roy Hudd, 83, actor (The Blood Beast Terror, Up the Chastity Belt, The Alf Garnett Saga) and comedian.
- 16 March
  - David Briggs, 102, English educator, headmaster of King's College School, Cambridge (1959–1977).
  - Mick Morris, 77, English footballer (Oxford United, Port Vale, Stafford Rangers).
- 17 March
  - Michael Broadbent, 92, wine critic and writer.
  - Betty Williams, 76, Northern Irish political activist, Nobel Prize laureate (1976).
- 18 March
  - Sir John Tooley, 95, opera administrator, general director of the Royal Opera House (1970–1988).
  - Kevin Taylor, 73, English rugby league player (Oldham, Leigh Centurions, national team). (body discovered on this date)
- 19 March
  - Sir Anthony Pigott, 76, lieutenant general, Deputy Chief of the Defence Staff (2000–2003).
  - Miranda, Countess of Stockton, 72, socialite and model. (death announced on this date)
  - Richard Tracey, 77, politician, MP (1983–1997).
  - Sir Peter Viggers, 82, lawyer and politician, MP (1974–2010).
  - Peter Whittingham, 35, English footballer (Cardiff City, Aston Villa, Blackburn Rovers).
- 20 March – Mark Andrews, 60, rower.
- 21 March – Ted Graham, Baron Graham of Edmonton, 94, politician, member of Parliament (1974–1983) and the House of Lords (since 1983), Lord Commissioner of the Treasury (1976–1979).
- 22 March
  - Julie Felix, 81, American-born folk singer.
  - Richard Sharpe, 66, historian and academic.
- 23 March
  - David Collings, 79, actor (Scrooge, The Thirty Nine Steps, The Invisible Woman).
  - Tristan Garel-Jones, 79, politician, MP (1979–1997), Minister for Europe (1990–1993) and Treasurer of the Household (1989–1990).
  - William Stern, 84, Hungarian-born businessman, first notable British victim of COVID-19. (death announced on this date)
- 24 March
  - John Campbell-Jones, 90, Formula One driver.
  - Tony Rutter, 78, motorcycle racer, Formula TT world champion (1981–1984).
  - Gerard Schurmann, 96, Dutch-born composer and conductor (The Bedford Incident, Attack on the Iron Coast, Claretta).
- 25 March – Jennifer Bate, 75, concert organist.
- 26 March
  - Jenny Clack, 72, palaeontologist.
  - Bill Martin, 81, songwriter ("Puppet on a String", "Congratulations", "Back Home") and music publisher.
  - Fred Smith, 77, English footballer (Burnley, Portsmouth, Halifax Town).
  - Hamish Wilson, 77, actor (Doctor Who) and radio producer (Radio Forth, Radio Clyde), COVID-19.
  - Jon Wynne-Tyson, 95, publisher, writer and animal rights campaigner.
- 27 March
  - Aneurin Hughes, 83, diplomat.
  - Frank Myler, 81, English rugby league player (Widnes Vikings, St Helens, national team).
  - Delroy Washington, 67, Jamaican-born reggae singer, COVID-19.
- 28 March
  - Azam Khan, 95, Pakistani-born squash player, COVID-19.
  - Dan McCauley, 84, football chairman (Plymouth Argyle).
- 29 March
  - Peter Beaumont, 85, racehorse trainer (Jodami).
  - James Ramsden, 96, politician, MP (1954–1974), Secretary of State for War (1963–1964) (last holder) and Minister for the Armed Forces (1964).
  - Derek Semmence, 81, English cricketer (Sussex).
- 30 March
  - Joe Ashton, 86, politician, MP (1968–2001).
  - Alex Forsyth, 91, Scottish footballer (Darlington)
  - John Haselden, 76, English footballer (Rotherham United, Doncaster Rovers) and manager (Huddersfield Town).
  - David Hodgkiss, 71, cricket chairman (Lancashire), COVID-19.
  - Ted Knight, 86, politician, leader of Lambeth London Borough Council (1978–1985).
- 31 March
  - James Gordon, Baron Gordon of Strathblane, 83, businessman, founder of Radio Clyde, COVID-19.
  - Andrew Jack, 76, dialect coach (The Lord of the Rings, Sherlock Holmes) and actor (Star Wars), COVID-19.
  - Arthur Marsh, 72, English footballer (Bolton Wanderers, Rochdale, Darlington)
  - Jack Schofield, 72, technology journalist (The Guardian, Practical Computing).
  - Peter J. N. Sinclair, 73, economist, COVID-19.
  - Michael Wakelam, 64–65, molecular biologist, COVID-19.

=== April ===
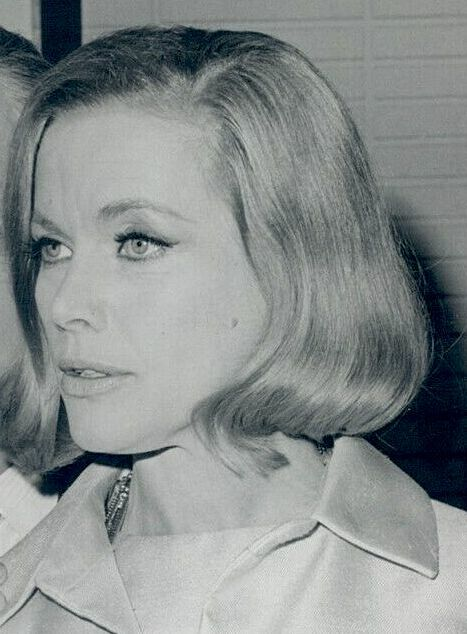
Honor Blackman in 1969

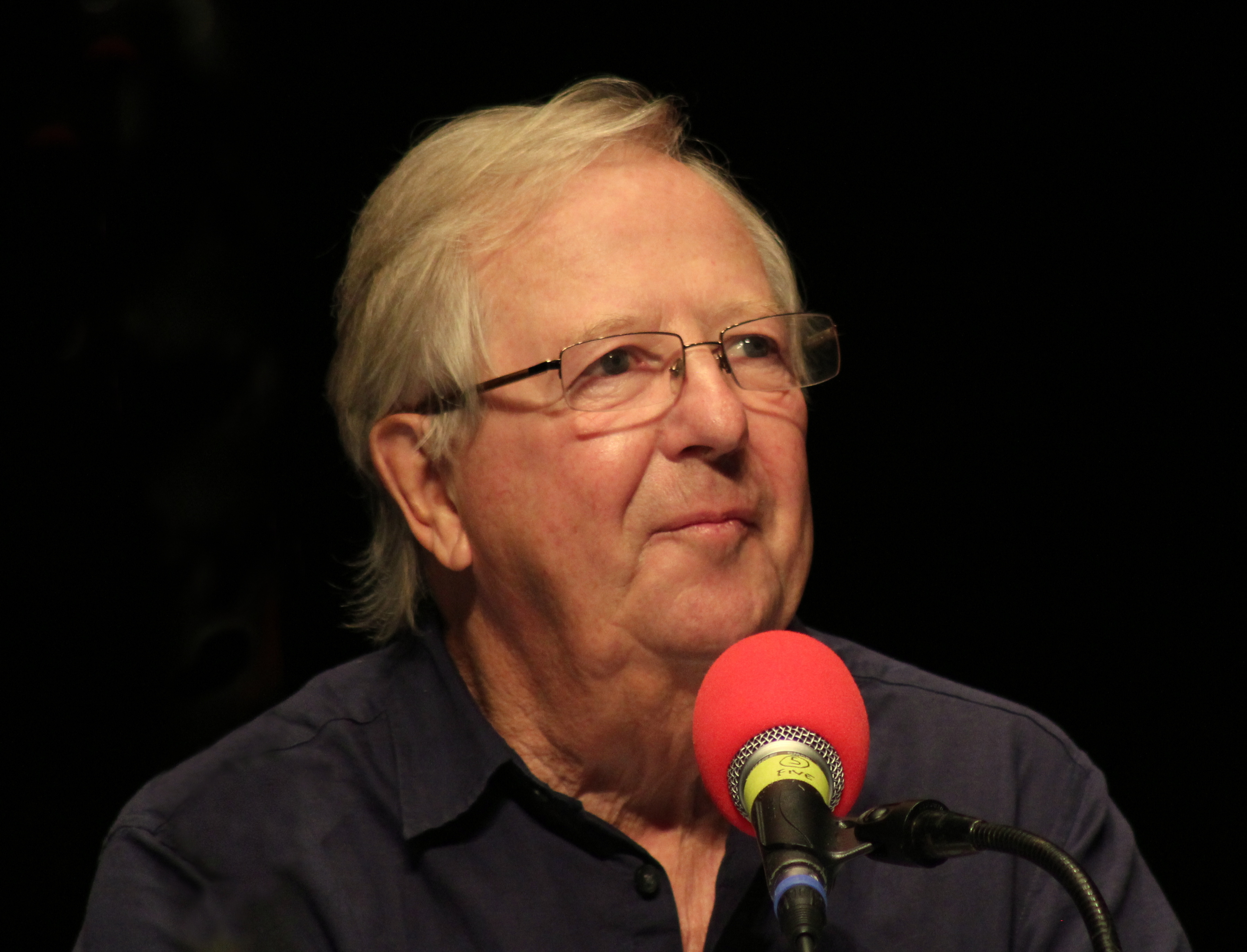
Tim Brooke-Taylor in 2014

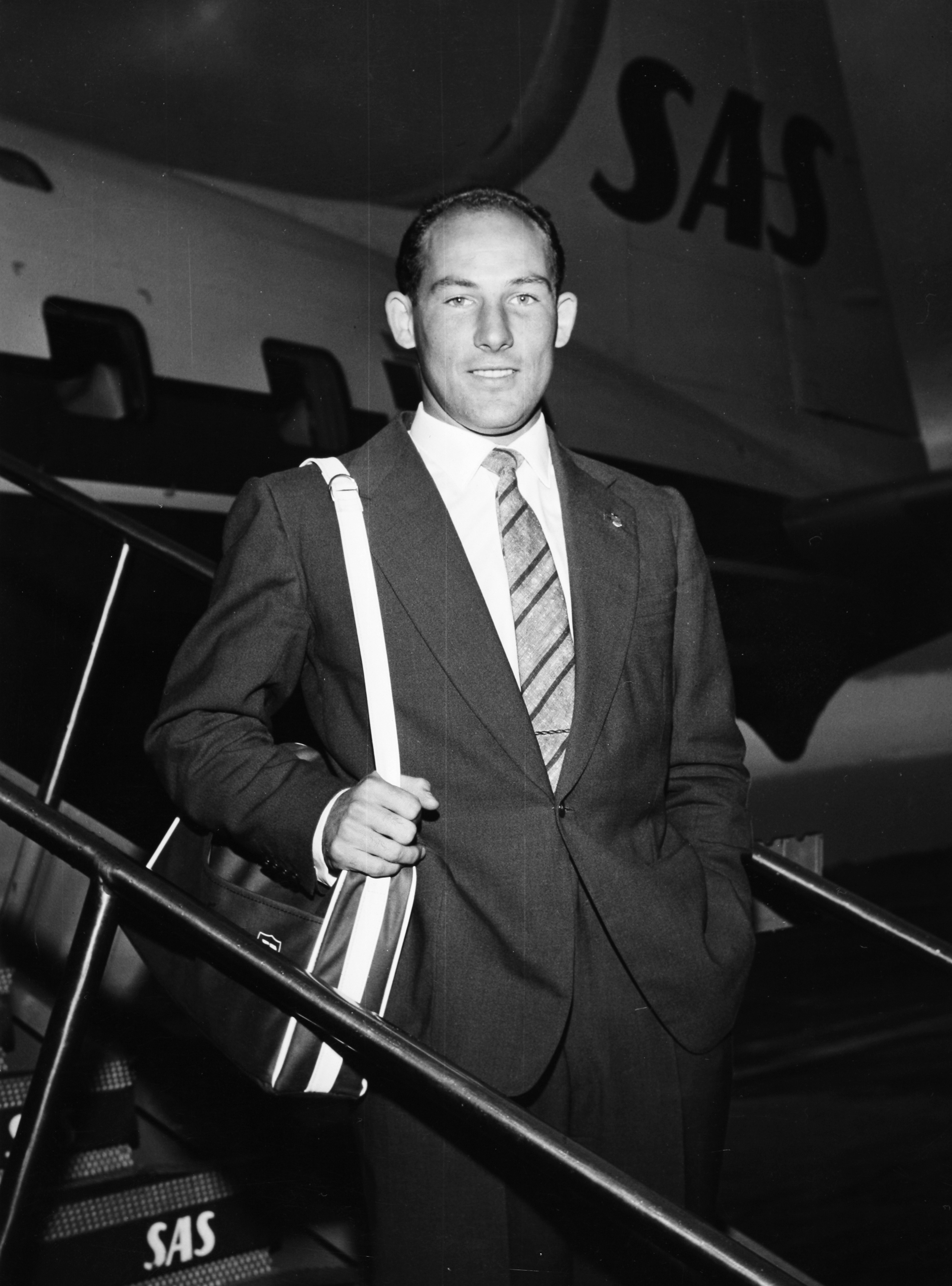
Stirling Moss in 1958

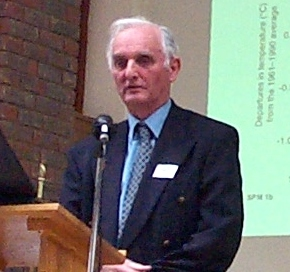
John Houghton in 2005

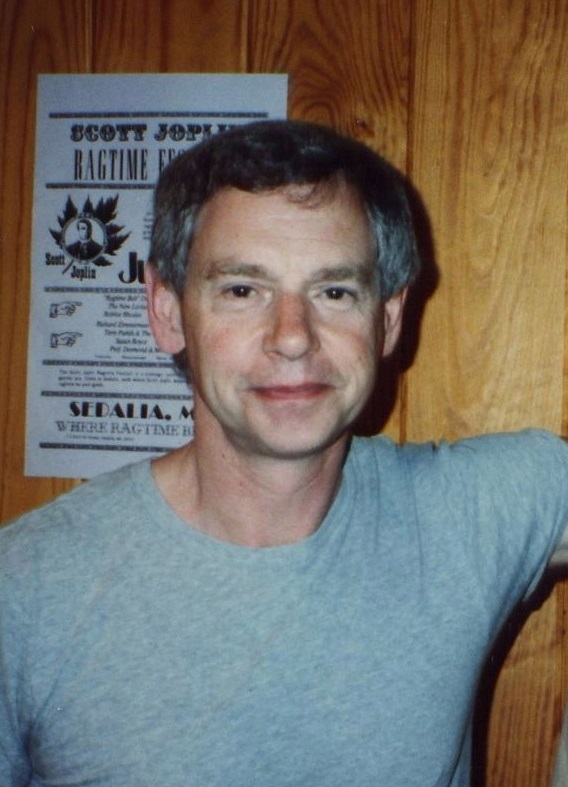
Ian Whitcomb in 1990

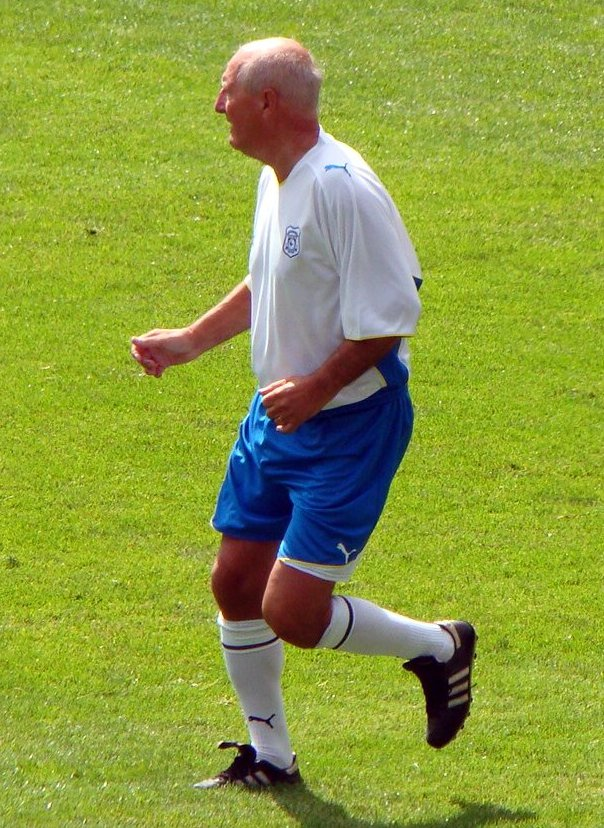
Jimmy Goodfellow in 2009

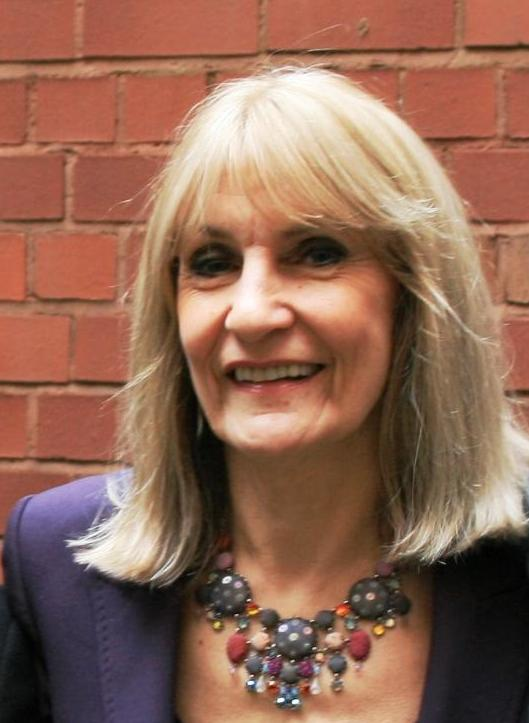
Lynn Faulds Wood in 2010

- 1 April
  - Sir James Learmonth Gowans, 95, immunologist.
  - Tony Lewis, 78, English mathematician, co-inventor of cricket's Duckworth–Lewis–Stern method.
- 2 April
  - William Frankland, 108, immunologist.
  - Ron Graham, 93, English-Australian actor (Home and Away, Waterloo Station).
  - Eddie Large, 78, comedian (Little and Large), COVID-19.
- 3 April
  - Robert Armstrong, Baron Armstrong of Ilminster, 93, civil servant, Cabinet Secretary (1979–1987) and Lord Temporal (since 1998).
  - Tim Robinson, 85, writer and cartographer, COVID-19.
- 4 April
  - Jay Benedict, 68, actor (Emmerdale, Foyle's War).
  - Alexander Thynn, 7th Marquess of Bath, 87, peer, politician and artist, Lord Temporal (since 1992), COVID-19.
- 5 April
  - Honor Blackman, 94, actress (The Avengers, Goldfinger, Jason and the Argonauts).
  - Margaret Burbidge, 100, English-American astronomer.
  - Ray Hiron, 76, English footballer (Portsmouth, Reading).
  - Sir John Laws, 74, jurist, High Court Judge (1992–1998) and Lord Justice of Appeal (1999–2016), COVID-19.
  - John Lucas, 90, philosopher.
  - Dougie Morgan, 73, Scottish rugby union player (Stewart's Melville, British and Irish Lions, national team).
  - Peter Walker, 84, English cricketer (Glamorgan, national team).
- 6 April – Black the Ripper, 32, grime MC, rapper and cannabis activist.
- 7 April
  - Nipper Read, 95, police officer and boxing administrator, COVID-19.
  - Barbara Smoker, 96, humanist activist and freethought advocate.
- 8 April – Eileen Croxford Parkhouse, 96, cellist, pedagogue, and founder of the Parkhouse Award.
- 9 April
  - Ida Schuster, 101, actress (Death Watch, A Shot at Glory).
  - Dmitri Smirnov, 71, Russian-born composer (Tiriel, The Lamentations of Thel), COVID-19.
  - Phyllis Wallbank, 101, educationalist.
- 10 April – Hilary Dwyer, 74, actress (Witchfinder General, Cry of the Banshee, Wuthering Heights), COVID-19. (death announced on this date)
- 11 April – John Horton Conway, 82, mathematician (Conway's Game of Life, surreal numbers, monstrous moonshine), COVID-19.
- 12 April
  - Peter Bonetti, 78, English footballer (Chelsea, Dundee United, national team), world champion (1966).
  - Tim Brooke-Taylor, 79, comedian (The Goodies) and panelist (I'm Sorry I Haven't a Clue), COVID-19.
  - Sir Stirling Moss, 90, Hall of Fame Formula One driver.
- 13 April
  - David Corbett, 79, English footballer (Swindon Town, Plymouth Argyle).
  - Peter Madden, 85, English footballer (Rotherham United) and football manager (Darlington, Rochdale).
  - Avrohom Pinter, 71, rabbi and politician, Hackney Borough councillor (1982–1990), COVID-19.
  - Alf Wood, 74, English footballer (Manchester City, Shrewsbury Town, Millwall, Hull City, Middlesbrough, Walsall).
- 14 April
  - Pip Baker, 91, screenwriter (Doctor Who).
  - John Collins, 71, Welsh footballer (Portsmouth, Halifax Town, Barnsley).
  - Cyril Lawrence, 99, English footballer (Rochdale, Wrexham), COVID-19.
  - John Lee, 92, politician, MP (1966–1970, 1974–1979).
  - Sir Hugh Rossi, 92, politician, MP (1966–1992) and Minister for Social Security (1981–1983).
  - Billy Wright, 89, English footballer (Blackpool, Leicester City, Newcastle United, Plymouth Argyle, Millwall).
  - Ron Wylie, 86, Scottish footballer and manager (Notts County, Aston Villa, Birmingham City, West Bromwich Albion).
- 15 April
  - Sean Arnold, 79, actor (Grange Hill, Bergerac).
  - Joe Brown, 89, mountaineer.
  - Sir John Houghton, 88, atmospheric physicist, COVID-19.
  - Bruce Myers, 77–78, actor (The Unbearable Lightness of Being, Let There Be Light), comedian, and director.
  - Kenneth Woollam, classical tenor, 83
- 16 April – Peter Phoenix, 83, English footballer (Oldham Athletic, Rochdale, Exeter City, Southport, Stockport County).
- 17 April
  - Norman Hunter, 76, English footballer (Leeds United, Bristol City, national team) and football manager, world champion (1966), COVID-19.
  - Matthew Seligman, 64, new wave bassist (The Soft Boys, Thompson Twins), COVID-19.
- 18 April – Terry Doran, 83–84, music manager (Grapefruit).
- 19 April
  - Dickie Dowsett, 88, English footballer (Southend United, Bournemouth, Crystal Palace).
  - Ian Whitcomb, 78, singer-songwriter ("You Turn Me On") and author.
- 20 April – Manjeet Singh Riyat, 52, head of emergency care at the Royal Derby Hospital, COVID-19.
- 21 April
  - Dame Ingrid Allen, 87, neuropathologist.
  - Dave Bacuzzi, 79, English footballer (Arsenal, Manchester City, Reading) and football manager, COVID-19.
- 22 April
  - Sir Eric Anderson, 83, educator, Headmaster (1980–1994) and Provost (2000–2009) of Eton College.
  - Sid Bishop, 86, English footballer (Leyton Orient).
  - Terence Frisby, 87, playwright (There's a Girl in My Soup) and actor.
  - Jimmy Goodfellow, 76, English footballer (Workington, Rotherham United) and football manager (Cardiff City).
  - Sir Peter Jonas, 73, arts administrator and opera director.
- 23 April
  - Peter Gill, 89, professional golfer, COVID-19.
  - Patrick Leo McCartie, 94, Roman Catholic prelate, Bishop of Northampton (1990–2001).
  - John Murphy, 77, Scottish footballer (Ayr United).
- 24 April
  - Lynn Faulds Wood, 72, television presenter (Watchdog) and journalist.
  - Don Woan, 92, English footballer (Liverpool, Leyton Orient, Bradford City, Tranmere Rovers).
- 25 April
  - Liz Edgar, 76, showjumper.
  - Rosemarie Wright, classical pianist and pedagogue, 88
- 26 April – John Rowlands, 73, English footballer (Stockport County, Barrow, Workington), COVID-19.
- 28 April
  - Michael Anderton, 88, English clergyman and cricketer.
  - Jill Gascoine, 83, actress.
  - Michael Robinson, 61, English footballer (Brighton & Hove Albion, Liverpool, Republic of Ireland national team) and sports commentator.
- 29 April
  - Trevor Cherry, 72, English footballer (Huddersfield Town, Leeds United) and football manager (Bradford City).
  - Allan Gauden, 75, English footballer (Sunderland, Darlington, Grimsby Town, Hartlepool United, Gillingham).
  - Jim Keers, 88, English footballer (Darlington).
  - Martin Lovett, 93, cellist (Amadeus Quartet).
- 30 April
  - John Bryant, 76, journalist and newspaper editor (The Daily Telegraph, The European, The Sunday Correspondent).
  - Jordan Cox, 27, English rugby league player (Hull Kingston Rovers, Warrington Wolves, Doncaster).

=== May ===
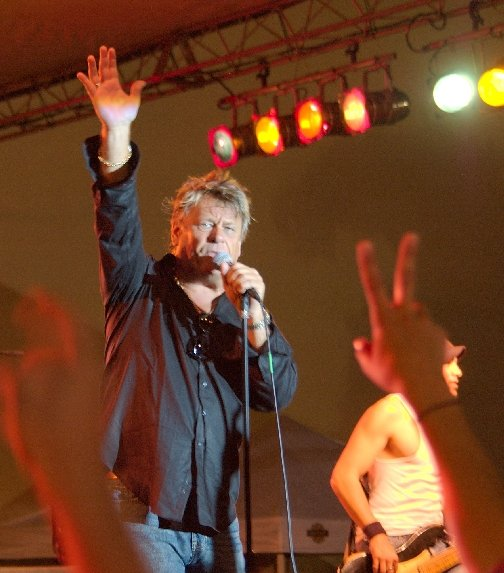
Brian Howe in 2009

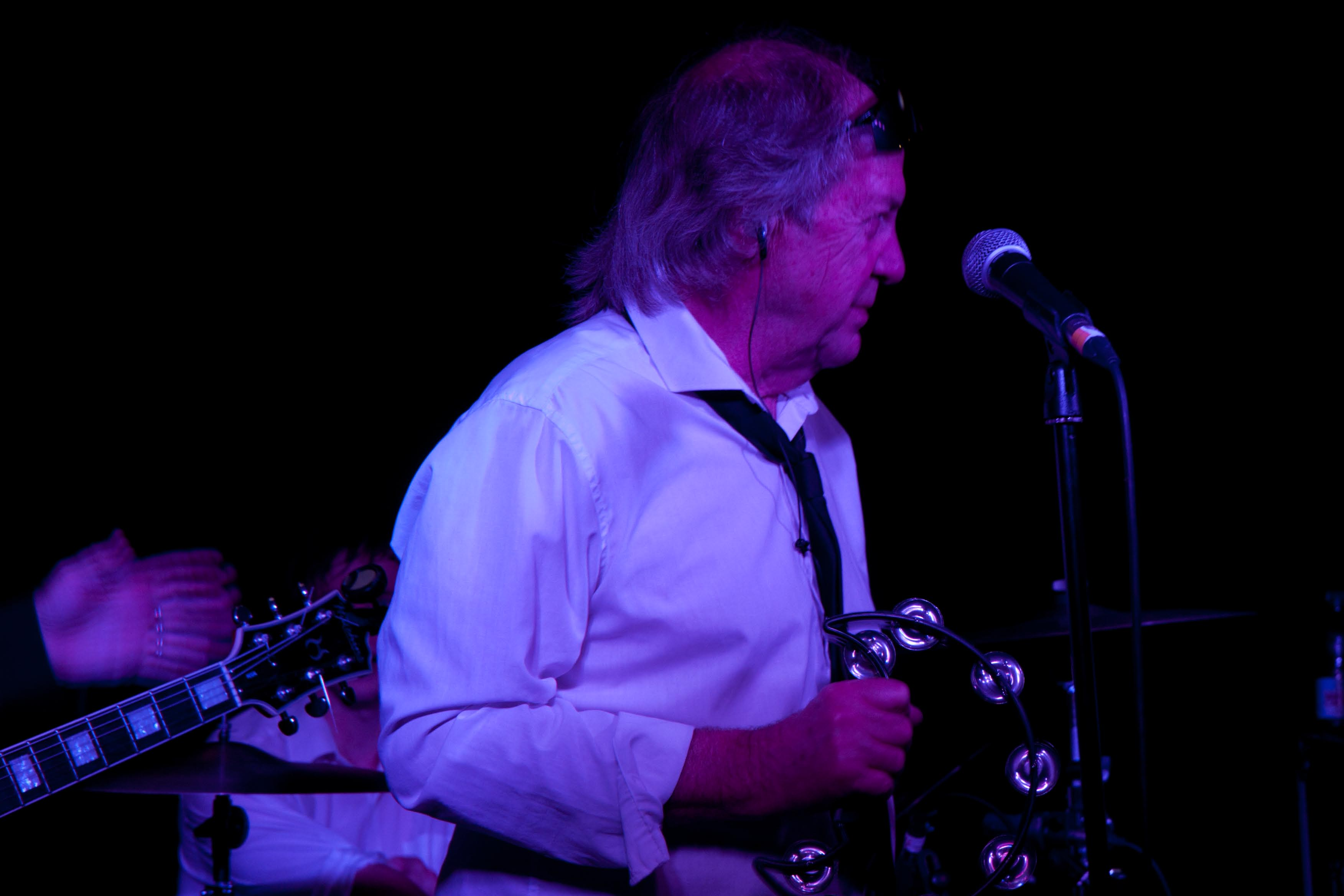
Phil May in 2013

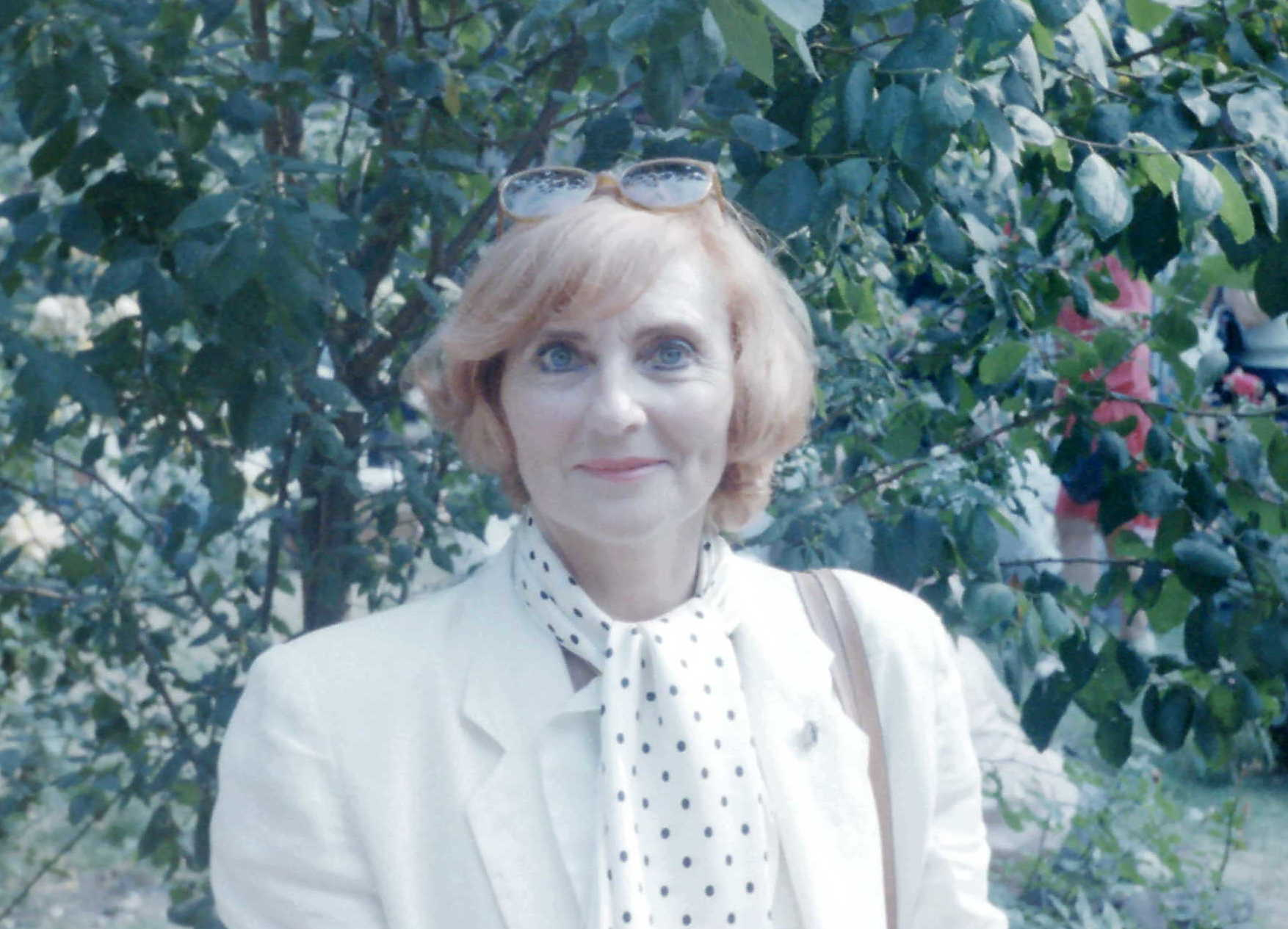
Heather Chasen

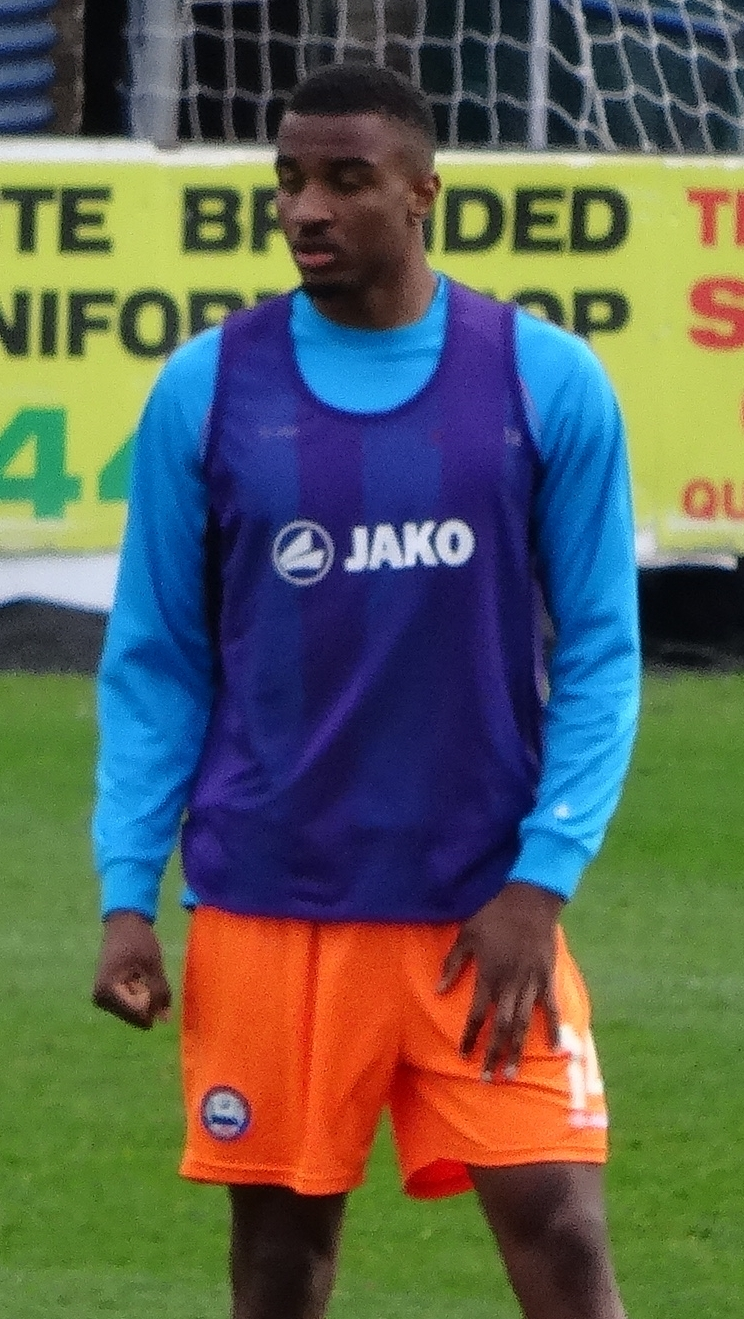
Christian Mbulu in 2017

- 1 May
  - Anne Heaton, 89, ballet dancer.
  - Francis Megahy, 85, film director (The Great Riviera Bank Robbery, Taffin), cancer.
  - Derek Ogg, 65, Scottish lawyer.
- 2 May
  - John Ogilvie, 91, Scottish footballer (Hibernian, Leicester City, Mansfield Town), COVID-19.
  - Jan Saxl, 71–72, Czech-born mathematician.
  - Sue Bruce-Smith, 62, film producer.
- 3 May
  - Dave Greenfield, 71, keyboardist (The Stranglers), COVID-19.
  - John Ridley, 68, English footballer (Port Vale, Leicester City, Chesterfield).
  - Peter Froggatt, 91, Northern Irish academic administrator and epidemiologist.
- 5 May
  - J. Denis Summers-Smith, 99, ornithologist and engineer.
  - June Bernicoff, 82, reality show participant (Gogglebox).
- 6 May
  - Brian Howe, 66, rock singer (Bad Company).
  - Sir John Birch, 84, diplomat, ambassador to Hungary (1989–1995), cancer.
- 7 May
  - Steve Blackmore, 58, Welsh rugby union player (national team).
  - Brian Bolus, 86, English cricketer (Yorkshire, Nottinghamshire, national team).
  - Ben Chijioke, 47, Mercury Prize-nominated rapper (stage name Ty), COVID-19.
  - William Clark, 101, RAF pilot and Battle of Britain veteran.
- 8 May – Carl Tighe, 70, author and academic, COVID-19.
- 11 May
  - Ann Katharine Mitchell, 97, cryptanalyst and psychologist, COVID-19.
  - Nigel, 11, television dog (Gardeners' World).
- 12 May
  - George Mikell, 91, Lithuanian-Australian actor (Kill Her Gently, The Guns of Navarone, The Great Escape).
  - David Green, 84, English cricketer (Derbyshire).
- 13 May
  - Will Forsyth, 24, English rugby league footballer (Dewsbury Rams).
  - Derek Lawrence, 78, record producer (Deep Purple, Wishbone Ash).
  - Clive Limpkin, 82, photojournalist.
  - Anthony Bailey, 87, writer and art historian, COVID-19.
- 15 May – Phil May, 75, singer (The Pretty Things).
- 16 May – Jon Whiteley, 75, child actor (The Kidnappers, The Spanish Gardener) and historian.
- 17 May – Colin Franklin, 96, writer and bibliographer.
- 18 May
  - Vincent Malone, 88, Roman Catholic prelate, Auxiliary Bishop of Liverpool (1989–2006), COVID-19.
  - Bill Olner, 78, politician, MP (1992–2010), COVID-19.
  - John Poole, British organist and choral conductor, 86
- 19 May
  - Ken Nightingall, 92, film sound engineer (For Your Eyes Only, A View to a Kill, Octopussy), COVID-19.
  - Peter Day, 81, chemist.
- 20 May – Margaret Maughan, 91, archer, swimmer and lawn bowler, Paralympic champion (1960, 1972). (death announced on this date)
- 21 May
  - Neil Howlett, 85, operatic baritone.
  - David Pawson, 90, evangelical minister.
- 22 May – Heather Chasen, 92, English actress (Crossroads, EastEnders, Les Miserables).
- 23 May
  - Charlie Cooper, 79, footballer (Bolton Wanderers, Barrow).
  - Glyn Pardoe, 73, English footballer (Manchester City).
  - Bryan Wharton, 86, photographer.
- 26 May
  - Sir John Brigstocke, 74, admiral, Second Sea Lord (1997–2000).
  - Christian Mbulu, 23, English footballer (Brentwood Town, Millwall, Motherwell, Crewe Alexandra, Morecambe).
  - Jonathan Whitehead, 59, musician and composer.
- 27 May – Tony Brown, 83, English cricketer (Gloucestershire).
- 28 May
  - Robert Weighton, 112, supercentenarian, world's oldest man (since February 2020), cancer.
  - Paul Shrubb, 64, English footballer (Fulham, Brentford, Aldershot).
- 29 May
  - Christopher Brocklebank-Fowler, 86, politician, MP (1970–1983).
  - Ron Johnston, 79, geographer, heart attack.
  - Jeanie Lambe, 79, jazz singer.
- 30 May
  - Michael Angelis, 76, actor (Boys from the Black Stuff, Thomas & Friends).
  - Sir John Coward, 82, vice admiral, Commandant Royal College of Defence Studies (1992–1994) and Lieutenant Governor of Guernsey (1994–2000).
  - Louise Page, 65, dramatist, cancer.
  - Trevor Thomas, 85–86, historian.
  - Don Weller, 79, jazz saxophonist.
- 31 May – John Furnival, 87, artist and teacher.

=== June ===
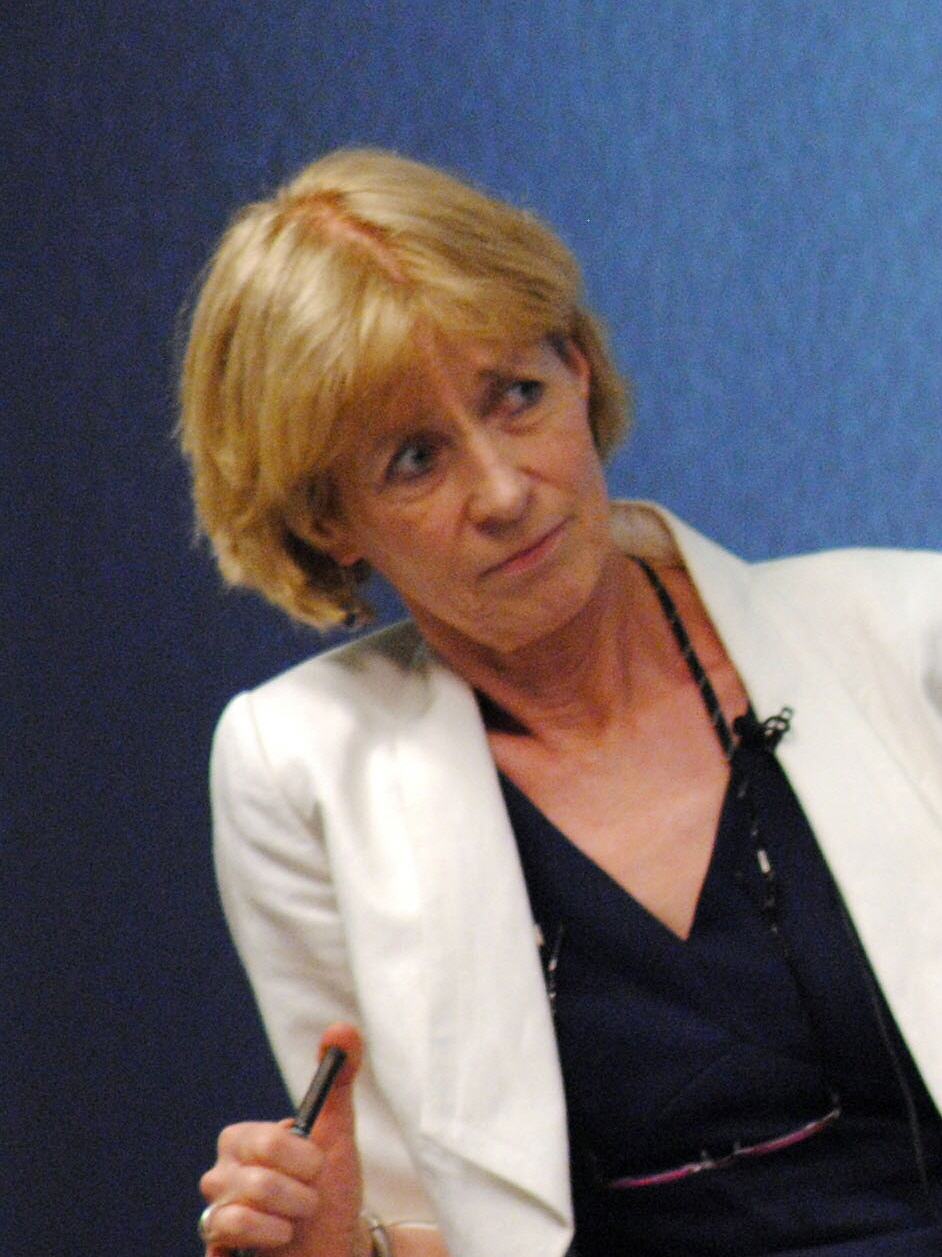
Rosemary Hollis in 2013

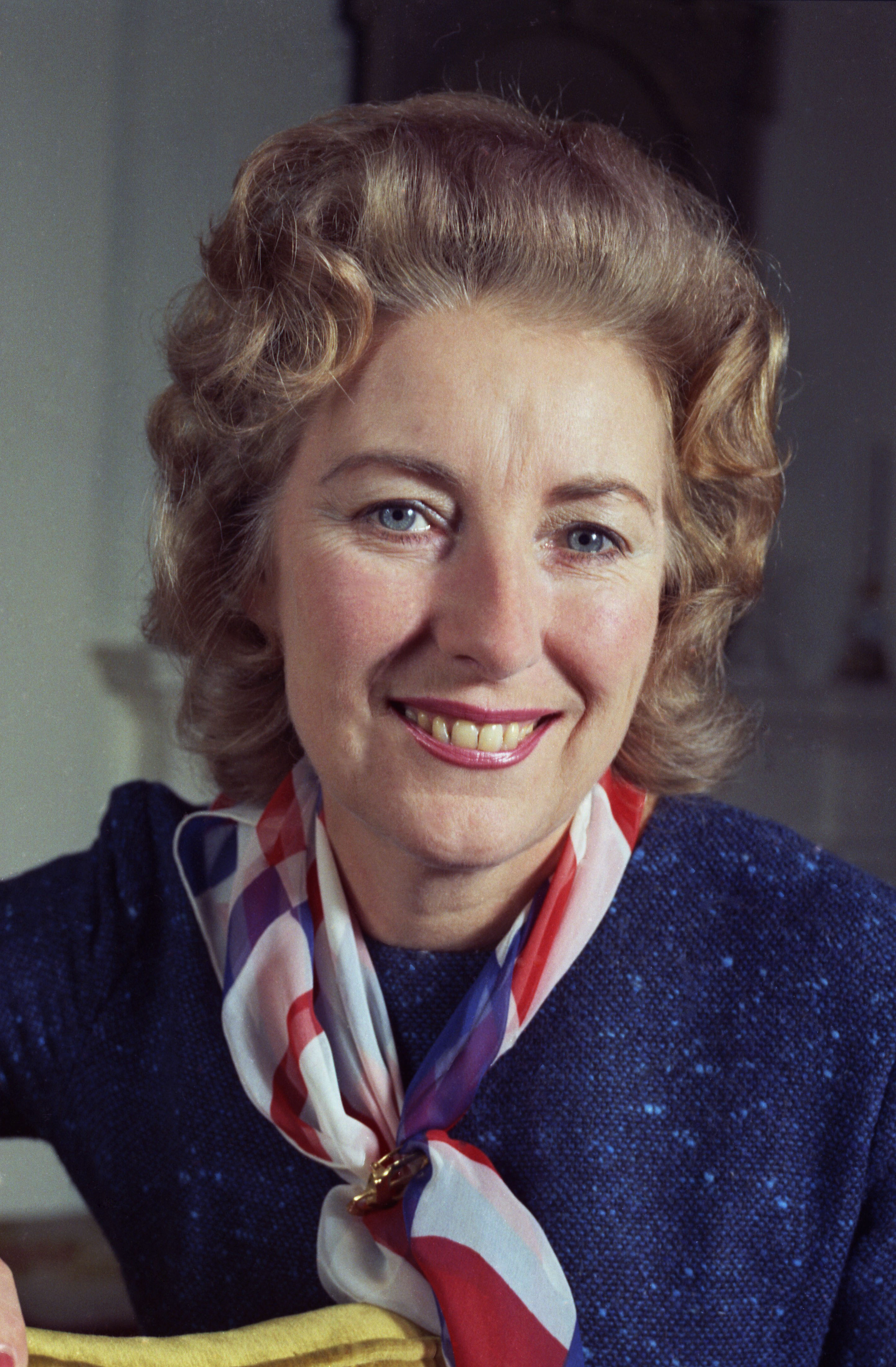
Vera Lynn circa 1973

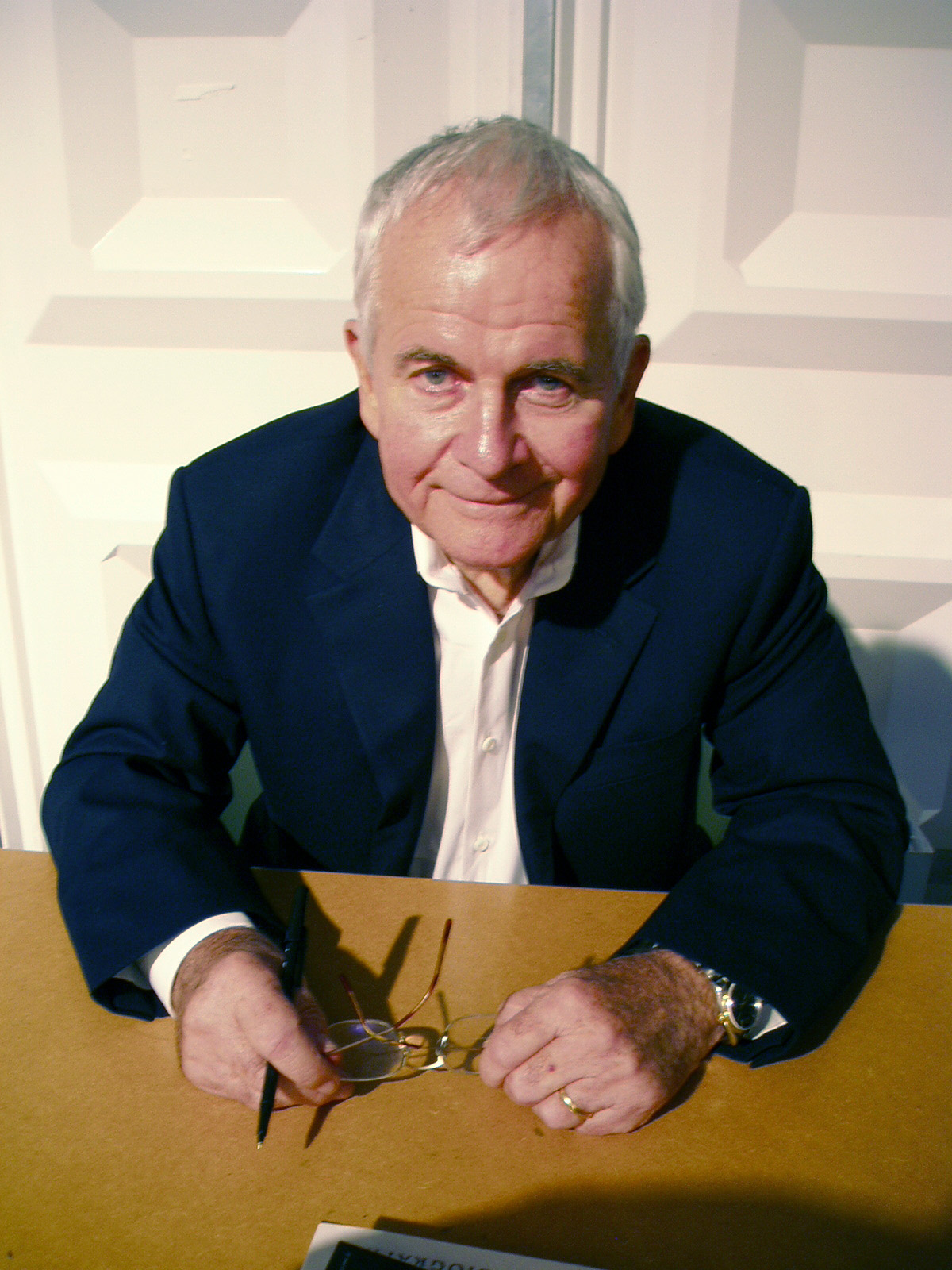
Ian Holm in 2004

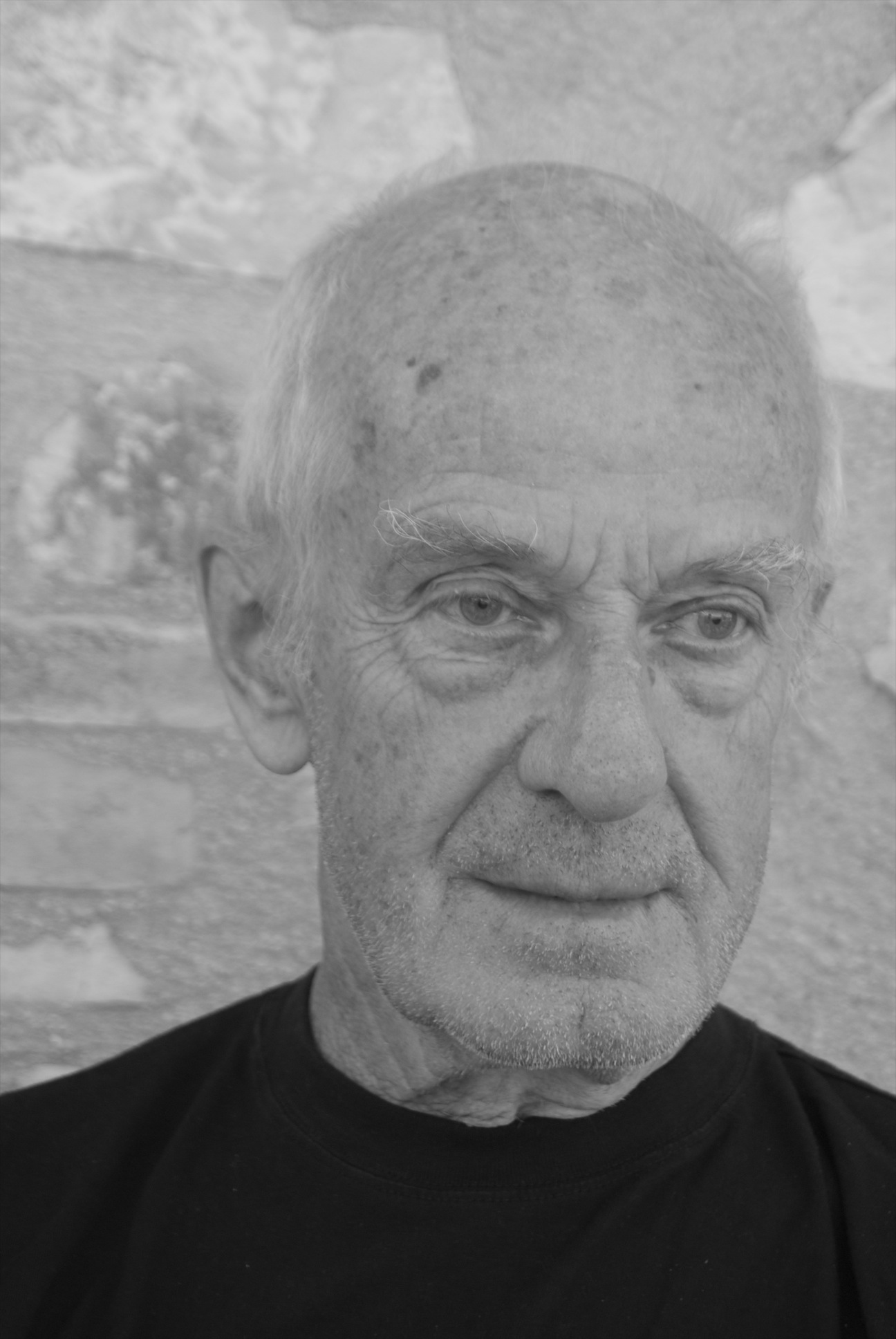
Julian Curry in 2011

- 1 June – Nicolas Rea, 3rd Baron Rea, 91, hereditary peer, doctor and politician.
- 2 June – Geoffrey Burnstock, 91, English-born neuroscientist.
- 3 June – Rosemarie Wright, 88, pianist. (death announced on this date)
- 4 June – Steve Priest, 72, bassist (and, later, lead vocalist) of the glam rock band The Sweet.
- 5 June
  - Ron Thompson, 88, English footballer (Carlisle United), bowel cancer.
  - Jim Fryatt, 79, English footballer (Bradord (Park Avenue), Oldham Athletic, Southport).
  - Rupert Hine, 72, musician (QuantuIdm Jump), songwriter and record producer (The Fixx, Howard Jones), cancer.
  - Rosemary Hollis, 68, political scientist.
- 7 June – Ralph Wright, 72, English footballer (Bolton Wanderers, New York Cosmos, Miami Toros).
- 9 June – Paul Chapman, 66, Welsh rock guitarist (UFO, Lone Star).
- 12 June – Ricky Valance, 84, Welsh singer, dementia.
- 13 June – Colo Tavernier O'Hagan, 75, British-French screenwriter (A Week's Vacation, Beatrice, Story of Women), cancer.
- 14 June – Keith Tippett, 72, jazz pianist (King Crimson, Centipede) and composer.
- 15 June
  - Bob, 14, cat (A Street Cat Named Bob).
  - Fred Jarvis, 95, trade union leader, General Secretary of the National Union of Teachers (1975–1989).
- 16 June – Mohammad Asghar, 74, Welsh member of the Senedd (since 2007).
- 17 June
  - Willie Thorne, 66, English snooker player and commentator.
  - Terry Dicks, 83, politician, MP (1983–1987).
- 18 June – Dame Vera Lynn, 103, singer ("We'll Meet Again", "The White Cliffs of Dover").
- 19 June
  - Sir Ian Holm, 88, English actor (Alien, Chariots of Fire, The Lord of The Rings), BAFTA winner (1981), complications from Parkinson's disease.
  - Harry Smith, 69, journalist.
- 20 June – Philip Latham, 91, actor (The Troubleshooters, Dracula: Prince of Darkness, Ring of Spies).
- 21 June
  - Felicity Bryan, 74, literary agent and journalist, stomach cancer.
  - David Hugh Mellor, 81, philosopher.
  - Ben Godfrey, 25, motorcycle racer, speedway collision.
- 22 June – Harry Penk, 85, English footballer (Wigan Athletic, Plymouth Argyle, Southampton).
- 23 June – Liam Treadwell, 34, English National Hunt jockey.
- 24 June
  - Jane Parker-Smith, 70, classical organist.
  - Sir Anthony Hammond, 79, lawyer and public servant, Treasury Solicitor (1997–2000).
- 25 June
  - Scott Bessant, 37, Welsh rugby player, pneumonia.
  - Richard Grove, 64, environmental historian.
  - Graeme Williamson, 71, rock singer (Pukka Orchestra), stroke.
- 26 June
  - James Dunn, 80, theologian.
  - Tony Pidgley, 72, property developer and financier (Berkeley Group).
  - Diana Maddock, Baroness Maddock, 75, politician, MP (1993–1997), Lord Temporal (since 1997) and President of the Liberal Democrats (1999–2000).
- 27 June – Julian Curry, 82, actor (Rumpole of the Bailey, Sky Captain and the World of Tomorrow, Escape to Victory).
- 28 June – Dame Ingrid Roscoe, 76, writer, Lord Lieutenant of West Yorkshire (2004–2018).

=== July ===
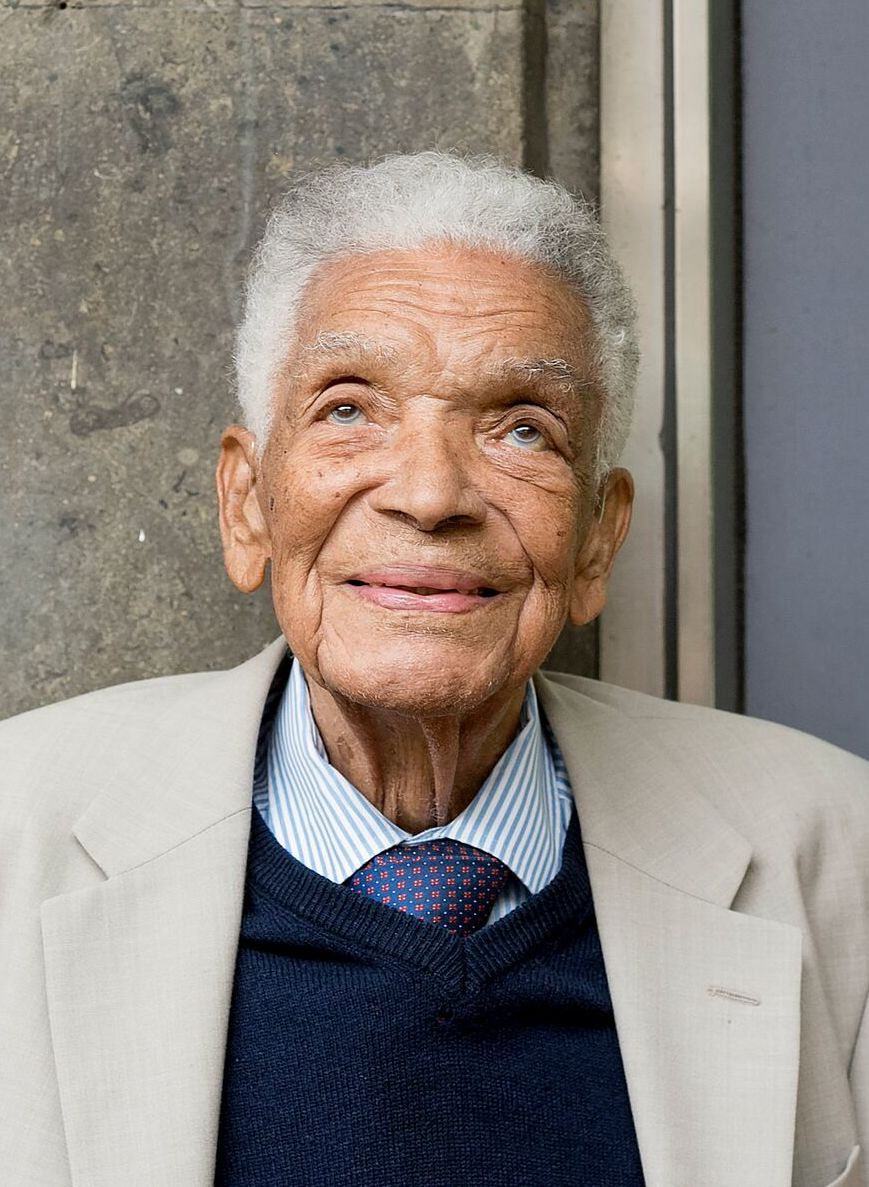
Earl Cameron in 2017

Johnny Beattie in 2009

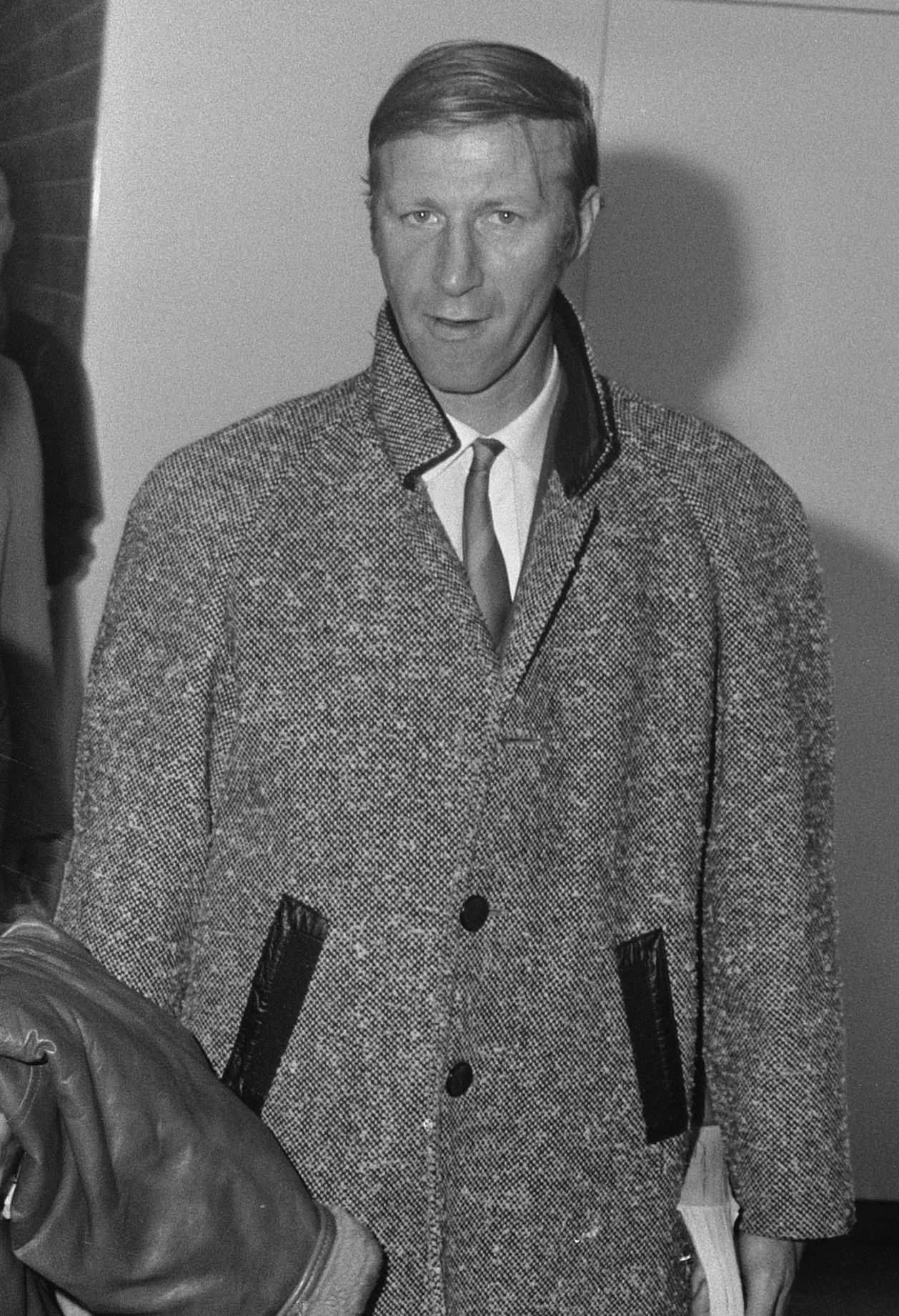
Jack Charlton in 1969

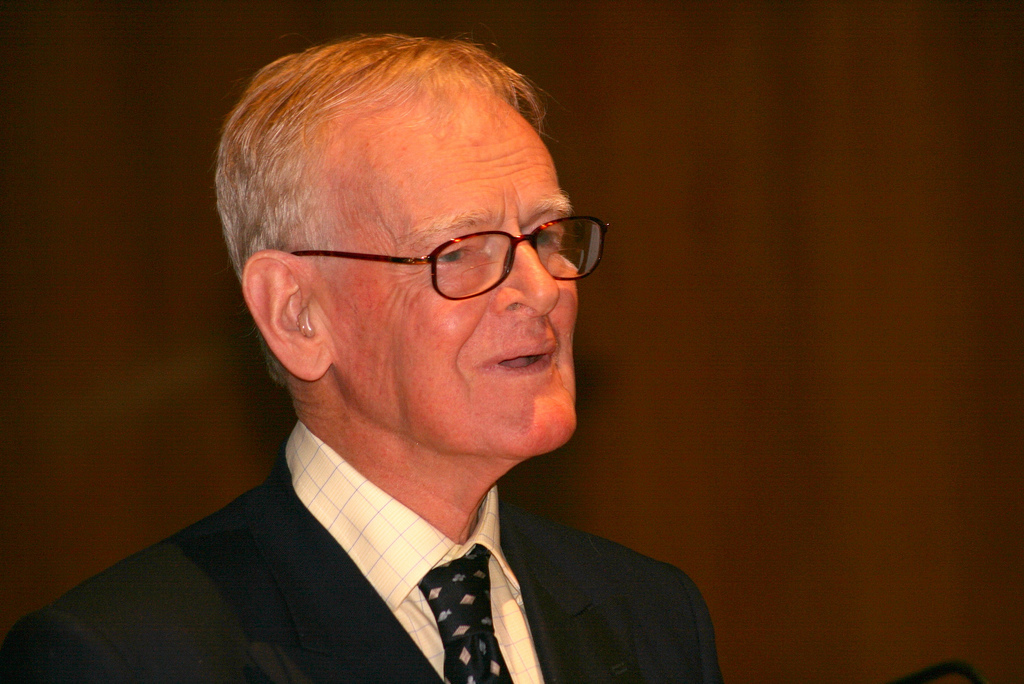
Stuart Wheeler in 2009

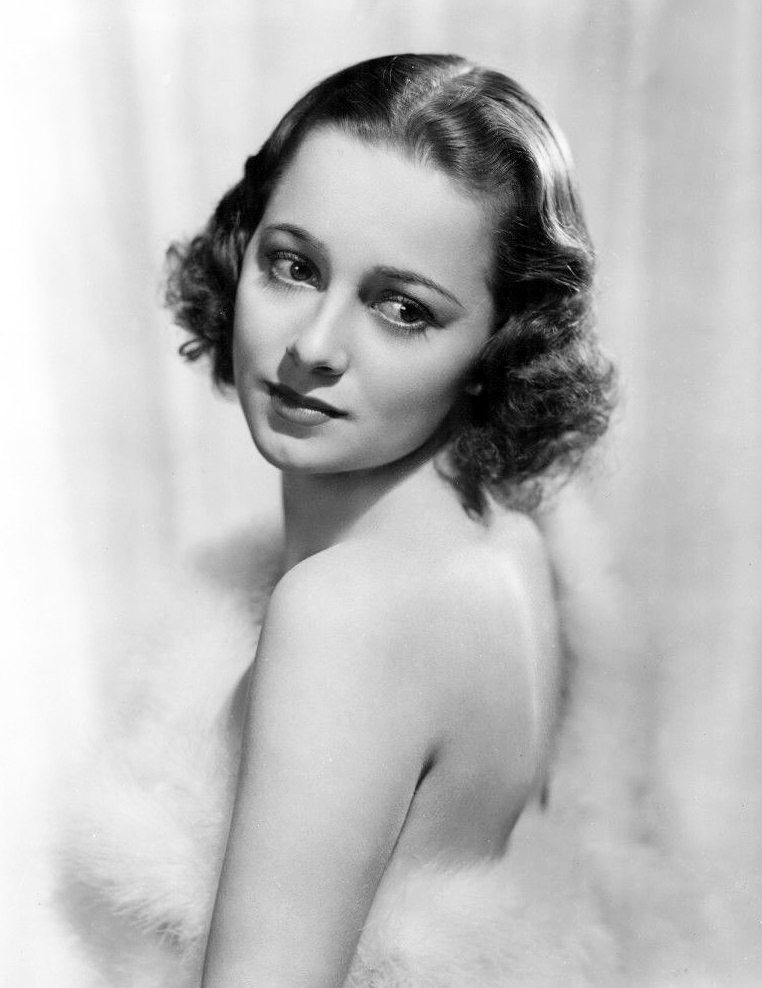
Olivia de Havilland in 1938

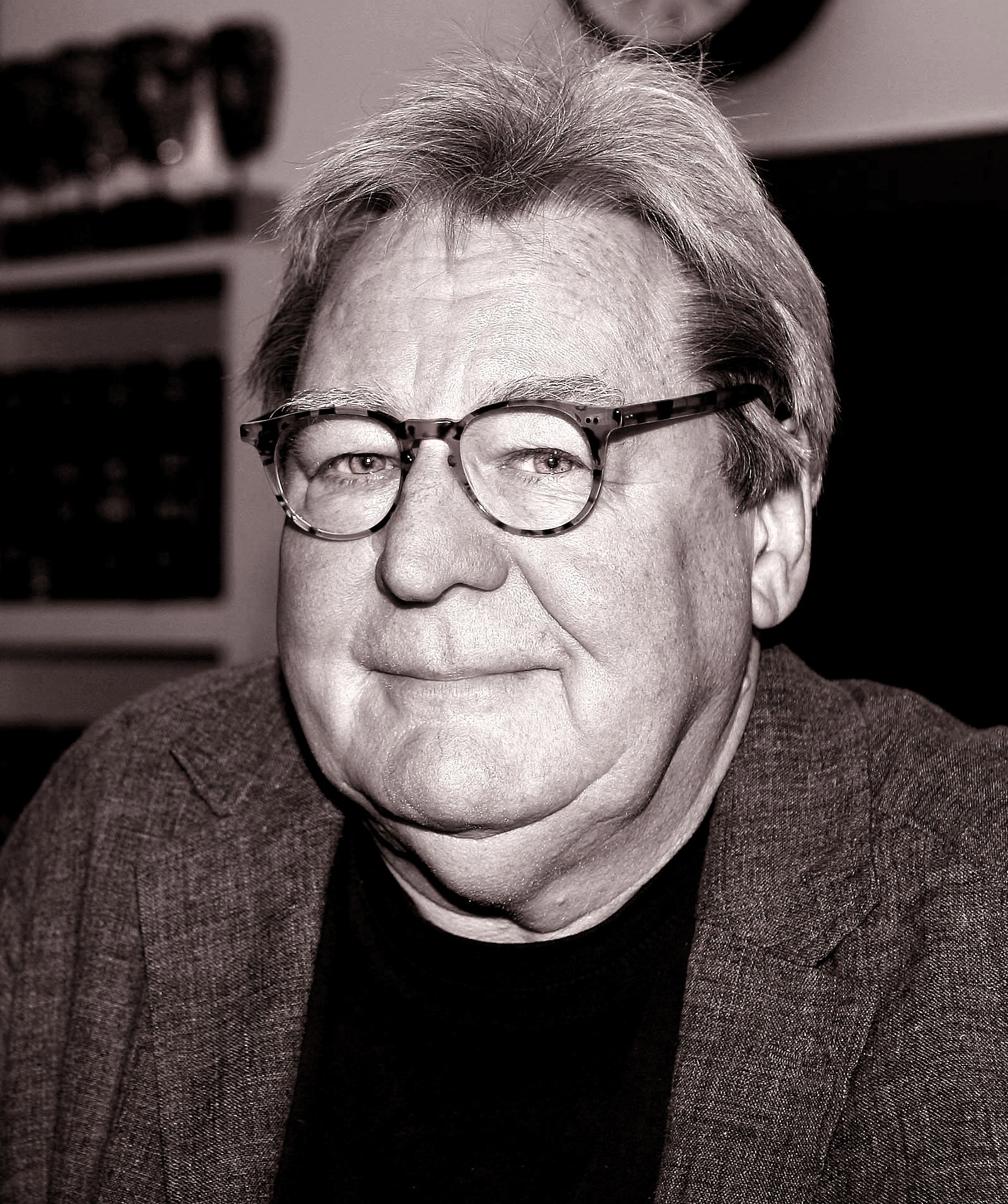
Sir Alan Parker in 2008

- 1 July – Ida Haendel, 96, Polish-born violinist.
- 2 July
  - Raymond Carter, 84, politician, MP. (1970–1979).
  - Mike Walling, 69, English comic actor and screenwriter.
- 3 July
  - Earl Cameron, 102, Bermudian-born actor (Doctor Who, Pool of London, The Interpreter).
  - John Peter, 81, theatre critic for The Sunday Times.
- 4 July
  - John Papworth, 98, English Anglican clergyman and activist.
  - Marc Treanor, 57, sand artist.
- 5 July
  - Horace Barlow, 98, neuroscientist.
  - Barrie Penrose, 78, investigative journalist and author, complications from Parkinson's disease.
  - Ena Thomas, 85, Welsh television chef.
- 7 July – Bill Ramsey, 76, English rugby league footballer.
- 9 July – Johnny Beattie, 93, Scottish actor (River City) and comedian (Scotch & Wry, Rab C. Nesbitt).
- 10 July
  - Jack Charlton, 85, English footballer (Leeds United, national team and manager (Republic of Ireland national team), world champion (1966), lymphoma and dementia.
  - Steve Sutherland, disc jockey (Choice FM, Galaxy FM).
- 12 July – Judy Dyble, 71, singer-songwriter (Fairport Convention), lung cancer.
- 13 July – Pat Quinn, 84, Scottish footballer (Motherwell, national team) and manager (East Fife).
- 14 July – Noël Martin, 60, Jamaican-born assisted suicide activist and neo-Nazi victim.
- 15 July
  - David Humphries, 66, English cricketer (Leicestershire, Worcestershire).
  - Maurice Roëves, 83, Scottish actor (Oh! What a Lovely War, Escape to Victory, Judge Dredd).
- 16 July – Tony Elliott, 73, English publisher, founder of Time Out Group.
- 17 July
  - Josephine Cox, 82, English author.
  - Alex Dawson, 80, Scottish footballer (Manchester United, Preston North End, Brighton & Hove Albion).
  - John Neale, 93, English Anglican clergyman, Bishop of Ramsbury (1974–1988).
  - J.I. Packer, 93, English-Canadian evangelical theologian (Knowing God).
  - Bill Scott, 74, Anglican priest, Deputy Clerk of the Closet (2007–2015).
  - Ron Tauranac, 95, British-Australian engineer and racing car designer, co-founder of Brabham.
- 21 July
  - Hugh McLaughlin, 75, Scottish footballer (St Mirren, Third Lanark, Queen of the South).
  - Lennox Napier, 92, major general.
  - Annie Ross, 89, British-American jazz singer (Lambert, Hendricks & Ross), songwriter ("Twisted"), and actress (Superman III), complications from emphysema and heart disease.
  - Mike Slemen, 69, English rugby union player (Liverpool, national team).
  - Tim Smith, 59, English singer-songwriter (Cardiacs, The Sea Nymphs, Spratleys Japs).
- 23 July
  - Alan Garner, 69, English footballer (Luton Town, Watford, Millwall).
  - Geoffrey Walton, 86, Anglican priest, Archdeacon of Dorset (1982–2000).
  - Stuart Wheeler, 85, financier and political activist, founder of IG Group and Treasurer of UKIP (2011–2014), stomach cancer.
  - Paulette Wilson, 64, Jamaican-born human rights activist.
- 24 July – David Hagen, 47, Scottish footballer (Falkirk, Clyde, Peterhead), motor neuron disease.
- 25 July
  - Dame Olivia de Havilland, 104, French-British-American actress (Gone with the Wind, The Adventures of Robin Hood, To Each His Own), Oscar winner (1947, 1950).
  - Peter Green, 73, English Hall of Fame blues rock singer-songwriter ("Black Magic Woman") and guitarist (Fleetwood Mac, Peter Green Splinter Group).
  - CP Lee, 70, English musician (Alberto y Lost Trios Paranoias).
- 26 July
  - Chris Needs, 68, Welsh radio broadcaster (BBC Cymru Wales).
  - Roger Williams, 88, hepatologist.
- 27 July – Denise Johnson, 56, English singer (Primal Scream).
- 28 July
  - Gerry Harris, 84, English footballer (Wolverhampton Wanderers).
  - Sir Bruce Liddington, 70, headteacher.
  - Sydney Lotterby, 93, television producer (Last of the Summer Wine, Yes Minister, Open All Hours).
  - John Loxley, 77, English-born Canadian economist.
  - Clive Ponting, 74, civil servant and historian.
- 29 July
  - Andre Ptaszynski, 67, theatre producer.
  - Don Townsend, 89, English footballer (Charlton Athletic, Crystal Palace).
- 30 July – Mark Rocco, 69, English professional wrestler (All Star Wrestling, NJPW).
- 31 July – Sir Alan Parker, 76, English film director (Midnight Express, Pink Floyd – The Wall, Mississippi Burning).

=== August ===
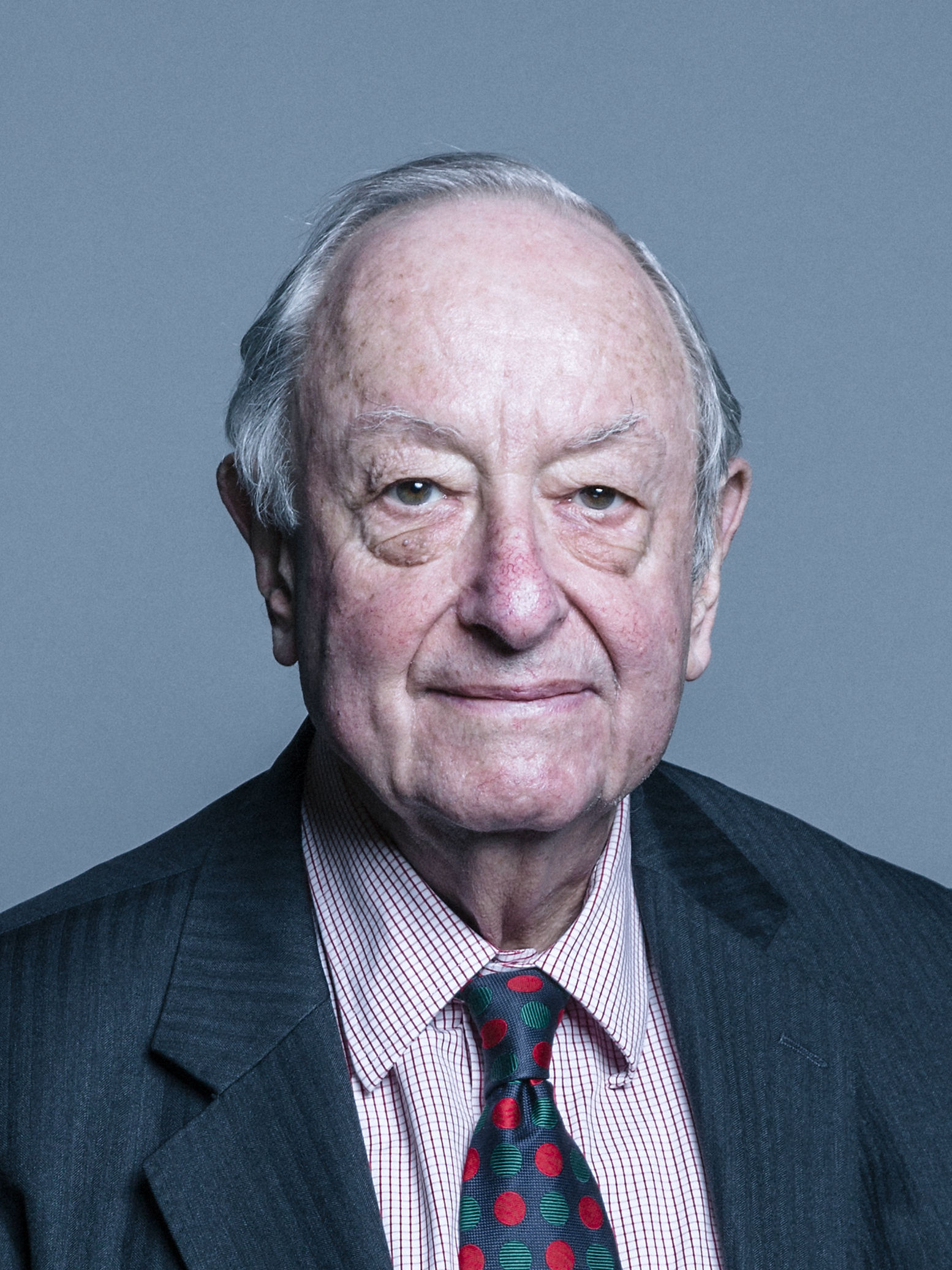
Anthony Lester, Baron Lester of Herne Hill

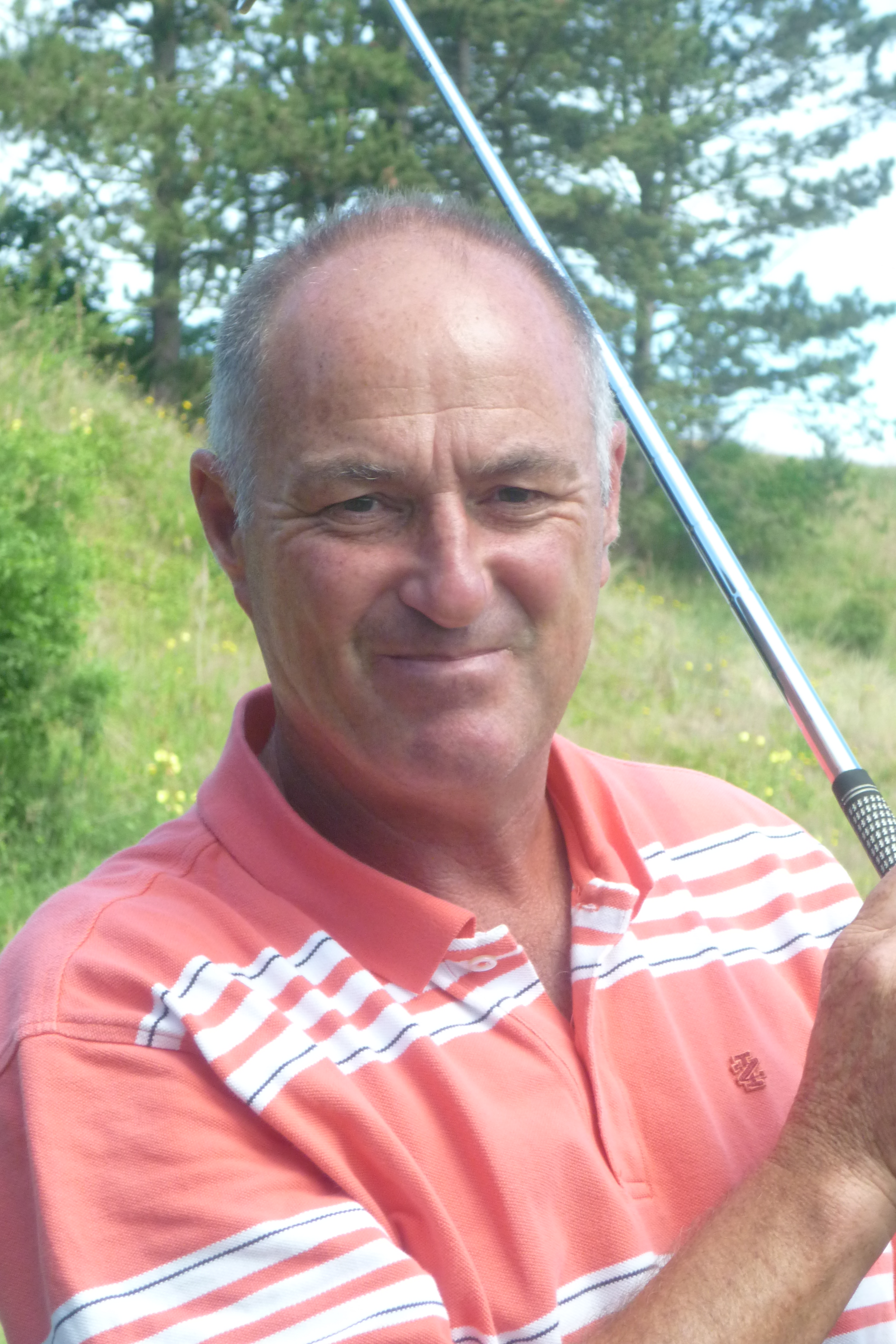
Gordon J. Brand

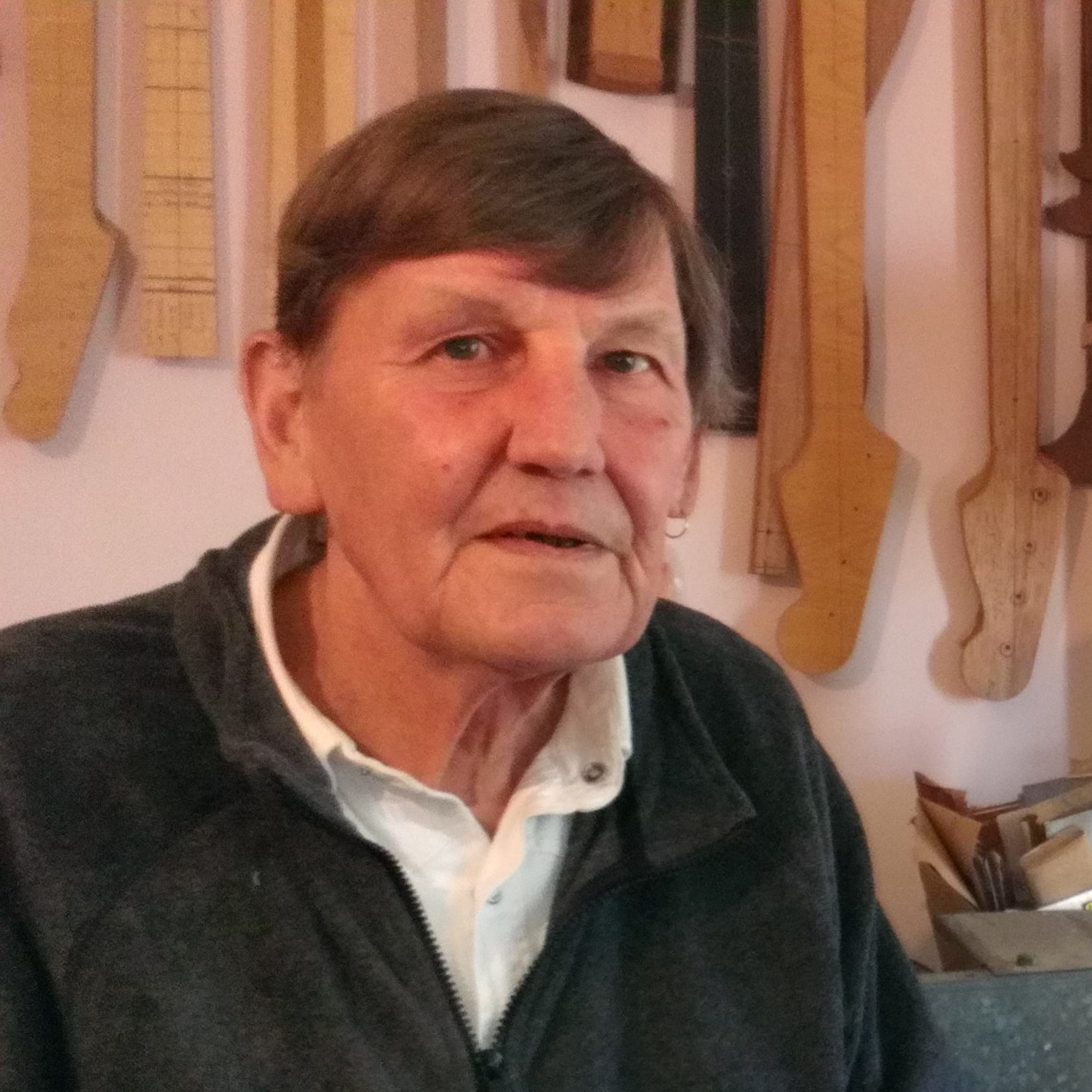
Chris Eccleshall in 2014

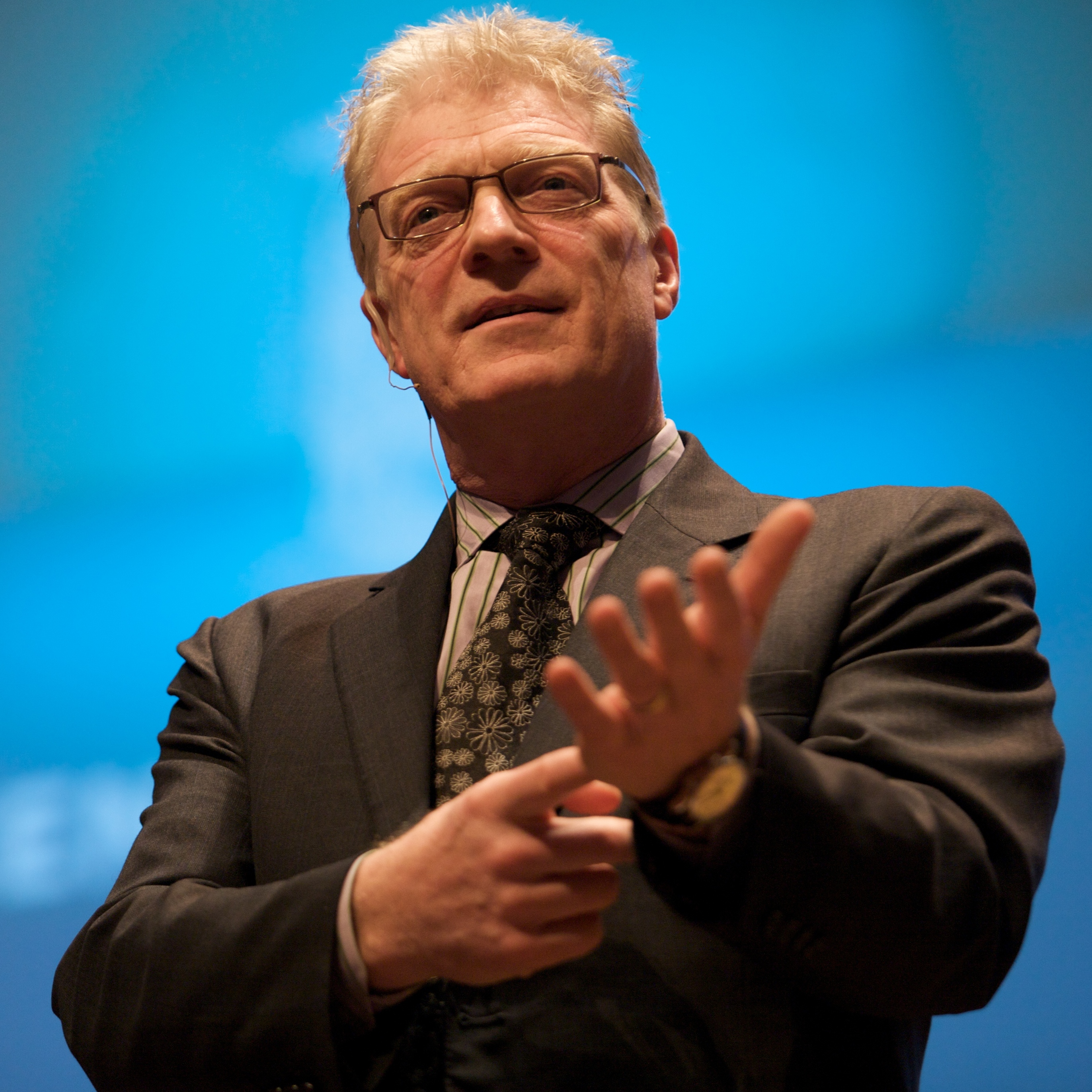
Ken Robinson in 2009

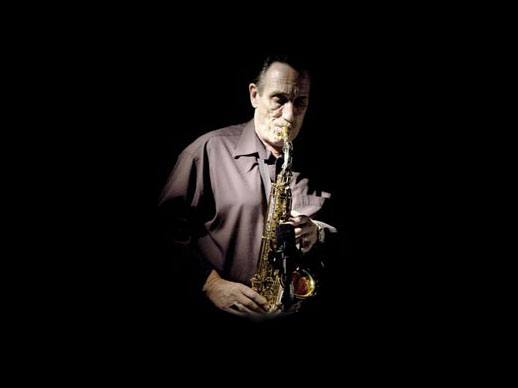
Peter King

- 1 August
  - Stan Mellor, 83, National Hunt jockey and horse trainer, Champion Jockey (1960–1962).
  - Tony Morris, 57, newsreader (ITV Granada), kidney cancer.
- 2 August
  - Mark Ormrod, 62, historian, bowel cancer.
  - Keith Pontin, 64, Welsh footballer (Cardiff City, Barry Town, national team).
- 3 August – Ernie Phythian, 78, English footballer (Bolton Wanderers, Wrexham, Hartlepool United)
- 4 August
  - Brian Black, 70s, television presenter (UTV)
  - Willie Hunter, 80, Scottish footballer (Motherwell, national team) and manager (Queen of the South).
- 5 August – Eric Bentley, 103, English-born theatre critic (The New Republic) and playwright.
- 6 August – Wayne Fontana, 74, English singer ("The Game of Love"), cancer.
- 8 August – Erich Gruenberg, 95, Austrian-born violinist and teacher.
- 9 August
  - Martin Birch, 71, music producer and engineer (Deep Purple, Whitesnake, Iron Maiden).
  - Anthony Lester, Baron Lester of Herne Hill, 84, barrister, member of the House of Lords (1993–2018).
- 11 August
  - Gordon J. Brand, 65, English golfer.
  - Mike Tindall, 79, English footballer (Aston Villa, Walsall)
- 13 August
  - Colin Parry, 79, English footballer (Stockport County, Rochdale)
  - Jackie Wren, 84, Scottish footballer (Rotherham United)
- 14 August
  - Julian Bream, 87, English virtuoso classical guitarist and lutenist.
  - Angela Buxton, 85, tennis player.
  - Chris Eccleshall, 72, English luthier.
  - Tom Forsyth, 71, Scottish footballer (Motherwell, Rangers, national team).
  - John Talbut, 79, English footballer (Burnley, West Bromwich Albion, K.V. Mechelen), complications from dementia.
  - Pete Way, 69, English rock bass guitarist (UFO, Waysted, Fastway), injuries sustained in accident.
- 15 August – Stuart Christie, 74, Scottish anarchist and writer.
- 16 August
  - Charles Allen, 80, Indian-born writer and historian.
  - Danny Campbell, 76, English footballer (West Bromwich Albion, Stockport County), pulmonary embolism.
  - Tommy Carroll, 77, Irish footballer (Republic of Ireland, Ipswich Town, Birmingham City)
  - Deirdre Le Faye, 86, English writer and biographer (Jane Austen).
  - Malcolm Manley, 70, Scottish footballer (Leicester City, Portsmouth)
  - James Partridge, 67, charity executive (Changing Faces).
- 18 August
  - Ben Cross, 72, English actor (Chariots of Fire, Star Trek, First Knight), cancer.
  - Roger Quigley, 51, English singer-songwriter.
- 19 August – Christopher Guy Harrison, 59, furniture designer, lung cancer.
- 20 August – Desmond Guinness, 88, Anglo-Irish author.
- 21 August
  - Jack Dryburgh, 81, Scottish Hall of Fame ice hockey player (Murrayfield Racers, Nottingham Panthers, Southampton Vikings) and coach.
  - Sir Ken Robinson, 70, educationalist and author, cancer.
- 23 August
  - Sir Neil Douglas, 71, Scottish physician, President of the Royal College of Physicians of Edinburgh (2004–2010).
  - Peter King, 80, English jazz saxophonist.
- 24 August
  - Frederick Baker, 55, Austrian-born filmmaker and archaeologist.
  - Harold Best, 82, politician, MP for Leeds North West (1997–2005).
  - Robbe De Hert, 77, English-born film director (De Witte van Sichem, Brylcream Boulevard, Lijmen/Het Been), complications from diabetes.
  - Thomas Imrie, 83, Scottish Hall of Fame ice hockey player (Paisley Pirates, Brighton Tigers, national team).
  - Pat McCluskey, 68, Scottish footballer (Celtic, Dumbarton).
- 25 August
  - Gerry McGhee, 58, Scottish-born singer (Brighton Rock), cancer.
  - Sir David Parry-Evans, 85, air chief marshal.
  - Tim Renton, Baron Renton of Mount Henry, 88, British politician, MP (1974–1997), Member of the House of Lords (1997–2016).
- 27 August
  - David Bryant, 88, English lawn bowler, world champion (1966, 1980, 1988).
  - David Mercer, 70, Welsh sports commentator and tennis umpire.

=== September ===
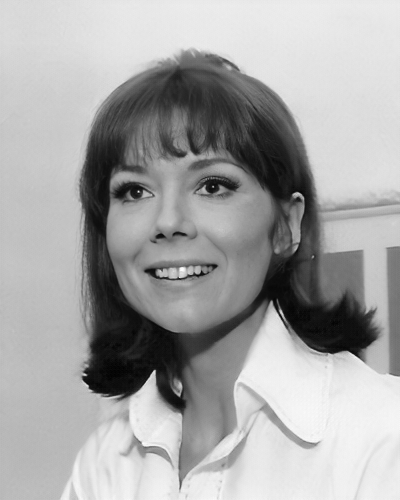
Dame Diana Rigg in 1973

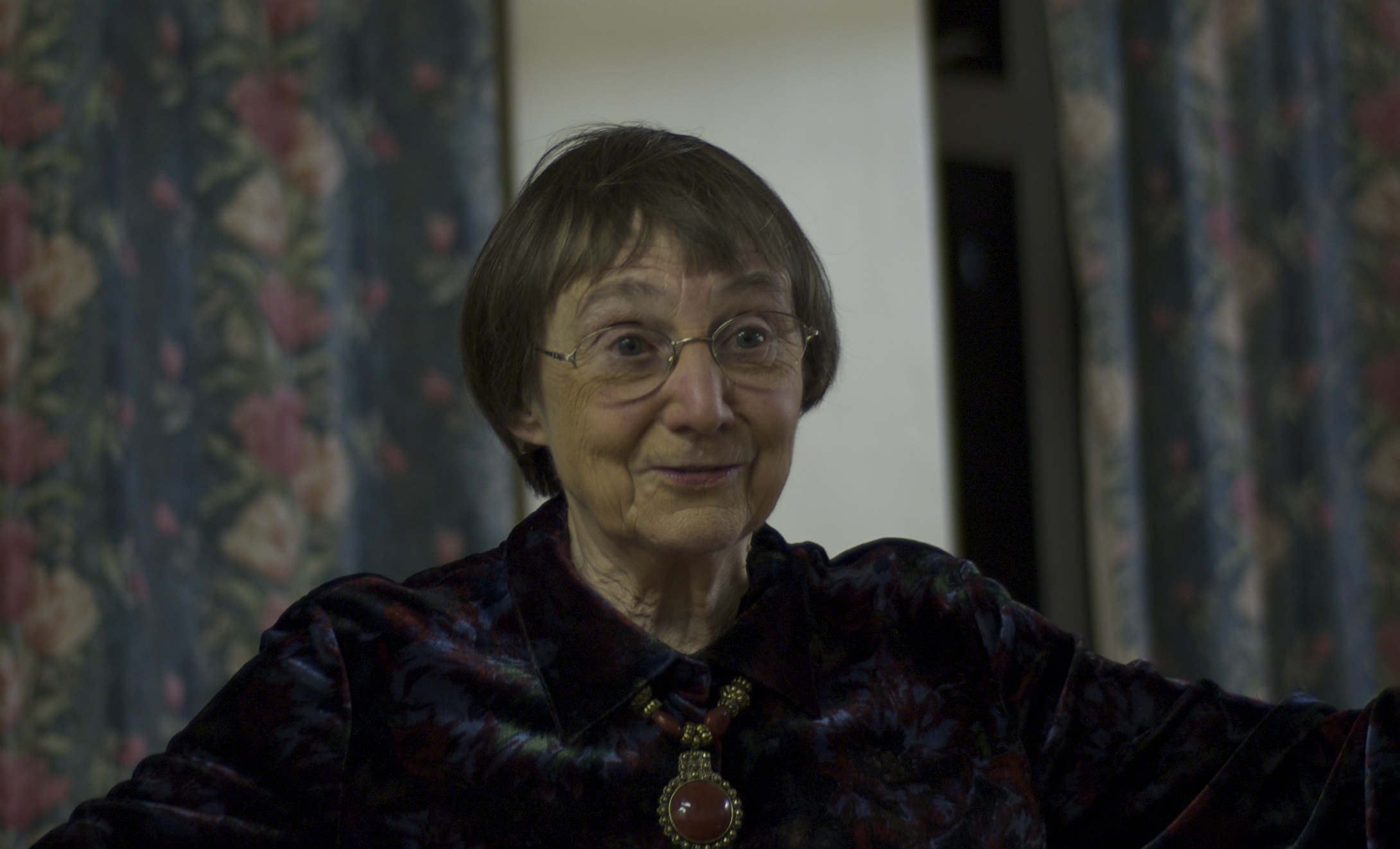
Anne Stevenson in 2009

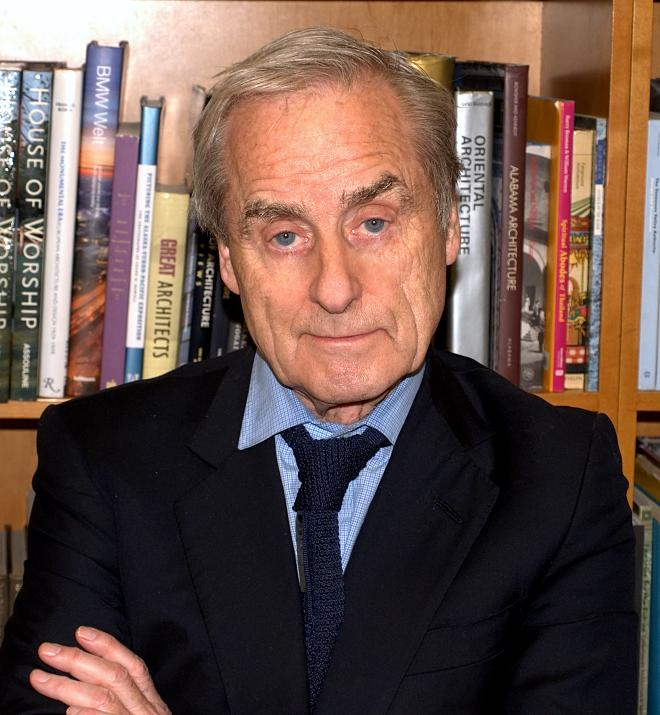
Sir Harold Evans in 2009

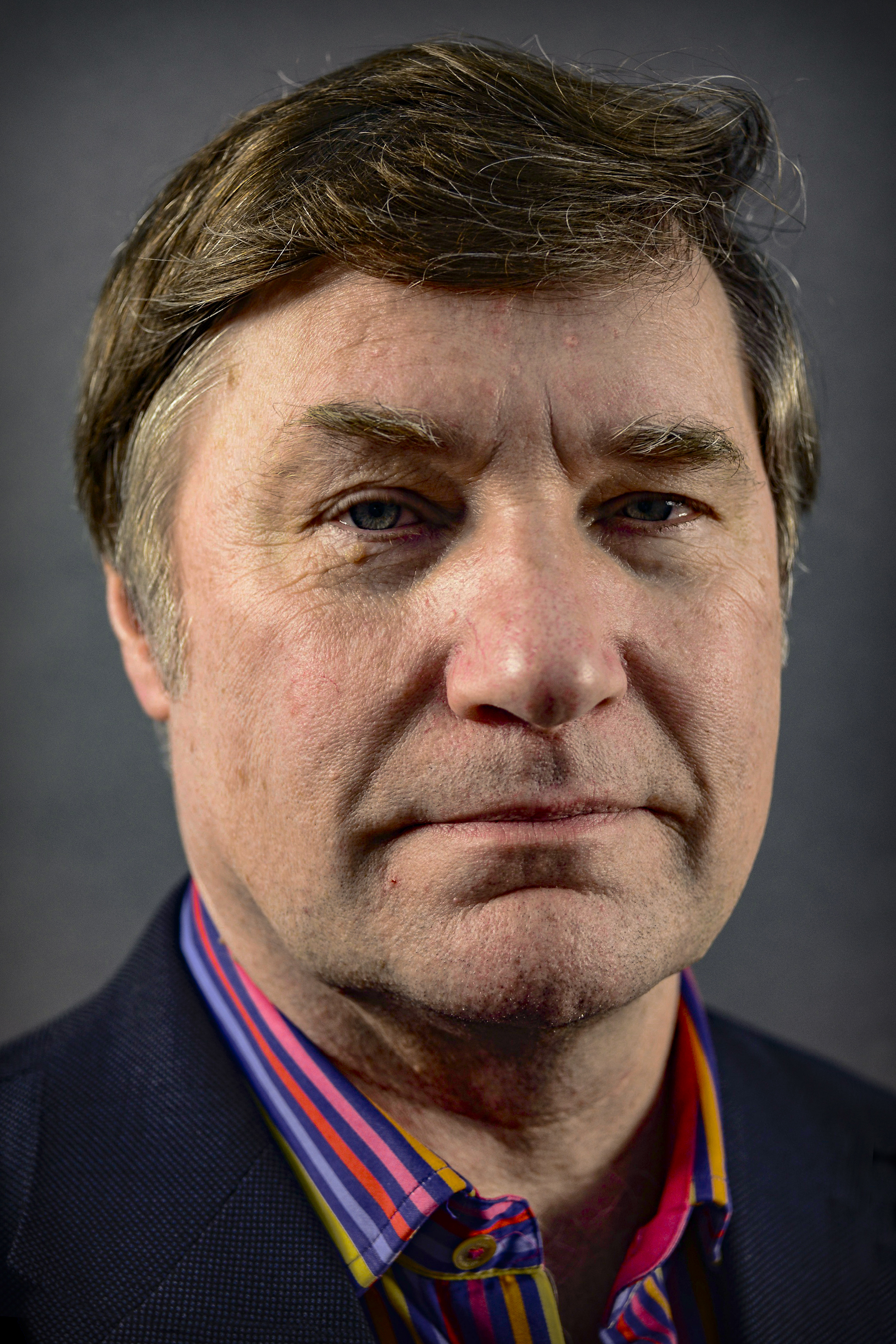
John D. Barrow in 2012

- 2 September
  - David Capel, 57, English cricketer (Northamptonshire, national team), brain tumour.
  - Albert Cheesebrough, 85, English footballer (Burnley, Leicester City, Port Vale, Mansfield Town).
  - Fred Davies, 81, English footballer (Wolverhampton Wanderers, Cardiff City, Bournemouth) and manager (Shrewsbury Town).
  - Rinat Ibragimov, Russia-born British orchestral double bassist and past principal double bass of the London Symphony Orchestra, 60 (from COVID-19).
  - John Shrapnell, 85, English-born journalist, singer and actor.
- 4 September – Sir Simon Boyle, 79, business executive and public servant, Lord Lieutenant of Gwent (2001–2016).
- 5 September
  - Rodney Litchfield, 81, English actor (Early Doors, Coronation Street, Phoenix Nights).
  - Al G. Wright, 104, English-born band director (Purdue All-American Marching Band).
- 6 September – Helen Taylor Thompson, 96, aid worker.
- 7 September – Logie Bruce Lockhart, 98, Scottish rugby union player (national team), schoolmaster, writer and journalist.
- 8 September
  - Sir Ronald Harwood, 85, South African-born author, playwright and screenwriter (The Pianist, The Dresser, The Diving Bell and the Butterfly), Oscar winner (2003).
  - Jane Soons, 89, British-born geomorphologist.
  - Tony Tanner, 88, actor (Stop the World – I Want to Get Off) and theatre director (Joseph and the Amazing Technicolor Dreamcoat).
- 9 September
  - Alan Minter, 69, boxer, Olympic bronze medallist (1972) and undisputed world middleweight champion (1980), cancer.
  - Tony Villars, 68, Welsh footballer (Cardiff City, Newport County, national team).
- 10 September – Dame Diana Rigg, 82, English actress (The Avengers, Game of Thrones, On Her Majesty's Secret Service), Tony winner (1994), cancer.
- 12 September
  - Sir Terence Conran, 88, English designer, restaurateur, retailer, and writer.
  - Barbara Jefford, 90, English actress (Ulysses, Philomena, The Ninth Gate).
- 14 September – Anne Stevenson, 87, British-born poet, heart failure.
- 17 September – Reg Harrison, 97, English footballer (Derby County, Boston United) and manager (Long Eaton United).
- 18 September – Sam McBratney, 77, Northern Irish author (Guess How Much I Love You).
- 19 September
  - David Cook, 76, Northern Irish, MPA (1982–1986) and Lord Mayor of Belfast (1978–1979), COVID-19.
  - Lee Kerslake, 73, English drummer (Uriah Heep, The Gods, Toe Fat), prostate cancer.
  - Dave Kusworth, 60, English musician (Jacobites).
- 20 September
  - Sir Malcolm Innes of Edingight, 82, Scottish herald, Lord Lyon King of Arms of Scotland (1981–2001), cancer.
  - Keith Jobling, 86, English footballer (Grimsby Town).
  - Alan Tomkins, 81, art director (The Empire Strikes Back, Saving Private Ryan, Batman Begins).
- 21 September
  - Michael Lonsdale, 89, French-born actor (The Day of the Jackal, Moonraker, The Remains of the Day).
  - John Meirion Morris, 84, Welsh sculptor.
  - Bobby Wilson, 84, English tennis player.
- 22 September
  - Archie Lyndhurst, 19, English actor (So Awkward).
- 23 September
  - Ray Batten, 75, English rugby league player (Leeds Rhinos, national team) and coach (Wakefield Trinity).
  - Sir Harold Evans, 92, English-American journalist (The Sunday Times, The Week The Guardian) and author, heart failure.
- 25 September
  - Peter Hampton, 66, English footballer (Leeds United, Stoke City, Burnley, Rochdale, Carlisle United).
  - Matiu Ratana, 54, New Zealand-born police officer, shot.
- 26 September – Jimmy Winston, 75, English musician (Small Faces) and actor (Doctor Who).
- 27 September
  - John D. Barrow, 67, English cosmologist, theoretical physicist and mathematician, colon cancer.
  - John Waddy, 100, British Army officer, Colonel SAS (1964–1967).
- 29 September – Justin Connolly, composer, 87.
- 30 September
  - Emyr Humphreys, 101, Welsh novelist (A Toy Epic) and poet.
  - Frank Windsor, 92, English actor (Z-Cars, Softly, Softly, EastEnders).

=== October ===
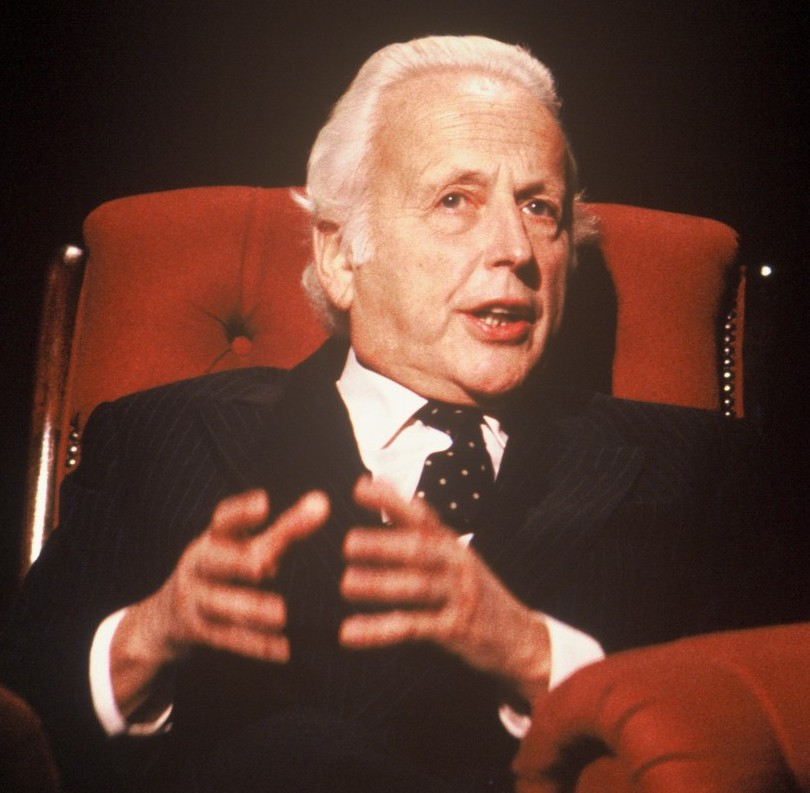
Peregrine Worsthorne in 1989

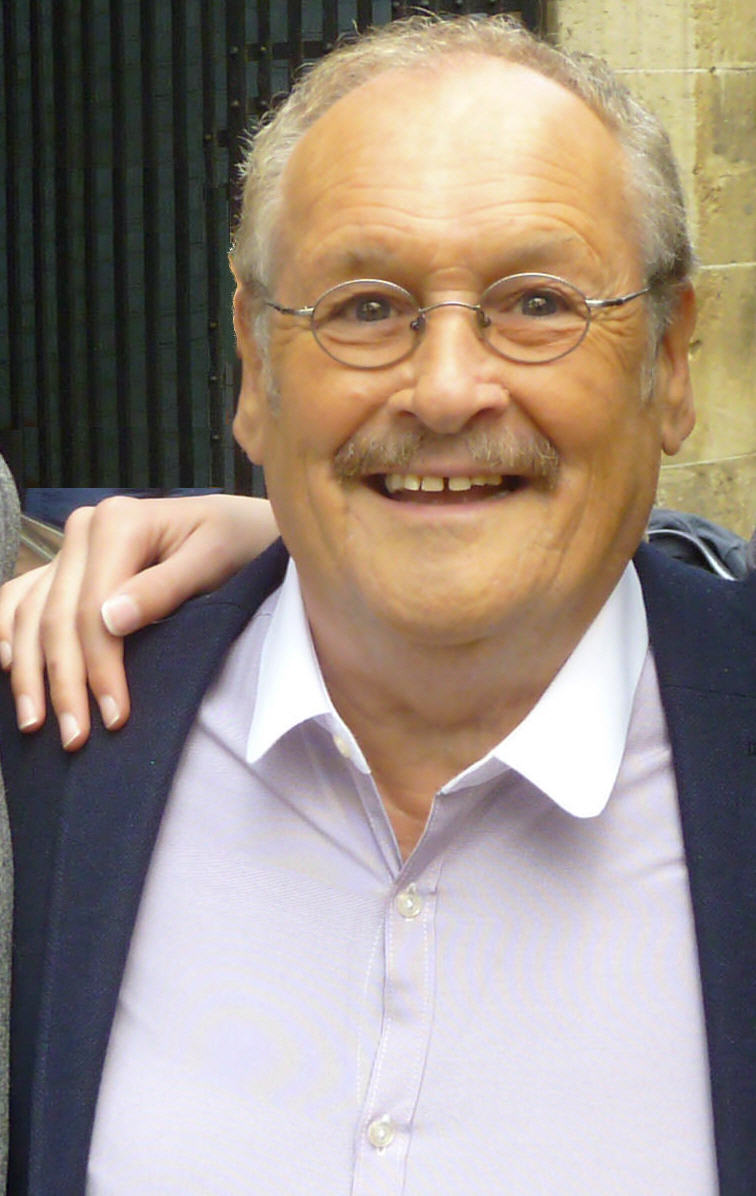
Bobby Ball in 2013

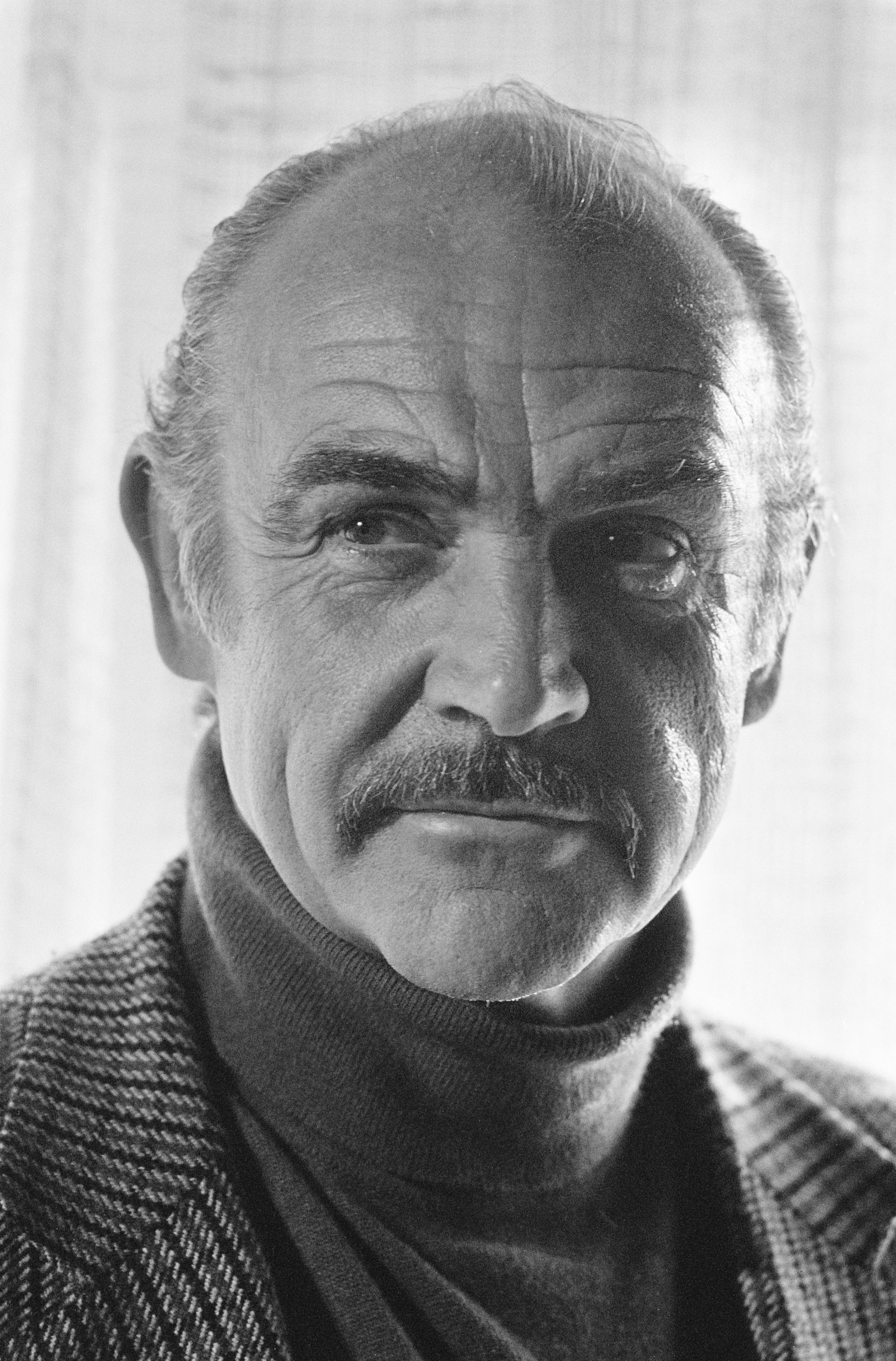
Sir Sean Connery in 1983

- 1 October
  - Zef Eisenberg, 47, motorcycle racer and television presenter, motorcycle crash.
  - Barry Mahy, 78, English-American footballer (New York Generals, New York Cosmos, United States national team).
- 3 October – Bob Wilson, 77, English footballer (Aston Villa, Cardiff City, Exeter City).
- 4 October – Sir Peregrine Worsthorne, 96, journalist and newspaper editor (The Sunday Telegraph).
- 5 October
  - Margaret Nolan, 76, English actress (Goldfinger, Carry On at Your Convenience, A Hard Day's Night).
  - Sir John Webster, 87, vice admiral, Flag Officer, Plymouth (1987–1990).
- 6 October – John Baring, 7th Baron Ashburton, 91, hereditary peer and merchant banker, chairman of the board of BP (1992–1995).
- 8 October
  - Sam Burton, 93, English footballer (Swindon Town), cancer.
  - Brian Locking, 81, English rock bass guitarist (The Shadows), bladder cancer.
  - Tommy Robson, 76, English footballer (Northampton Town, Chelsea, Newcastle United, Peterborough United), motor neurone disease.
- 10 October – Dyan Birch, 71, English singer (Arrival, Kokomo), chronic obstructive pulmonary disease.
- 11 October – Richie Barker, 80, English footballer (Derby County, Notts County, Peterborough United and manager (Shrewsbury Town, Stoke City, Notts County).
- 12 October – Sir Samuel Brittan, 86, English journalist and author.
- 14 October
  - Sir James Jungius, 96, vice admiral, Deputy Supreme Allied Commander Atlantic (1975–1977).
  - Herbert Kretzmer, 95, South African-born English journalist and lyricist (Les Misérables).
- 15 October – Tom Maschler, 87, German-born publisher, founder of the Booker Prize.
- 16 October
  - Sir Roy Beldam, 95, judge, Lord Justice of Appeal (1989–2000).
  - Gordon Haskell, 74, English singer-songwriter ("How Wonderful You Are") and musician (King Crimson, The Fleur de Lys), cancer.
  - Dave Toole, 56, English dancer and actor.
- 18 October – Jill Paton Walsh, 83, English novelist (Knowledge of Angels, A Presumption of Death, The Attenbury Emeralds).
- 19 October
  - Spencer Davis, 81, Welsh musician (The Spencer Davis Group), pneumonia.
  - Tony Lewis, 62, English bassist, singer and songwriter (The Outfield).
  - Sir John Margetson, 93, diplomat, Ambassador to Vietnam (1978–1980) and the Netherlands (1984–1988), Gentleman Usher of the Blue Rod (1992–2002).
  - Jim Townsend, 75, Scottish football player (Middlesbrough, Heart of Midlothian) and manager (Windsor Wheels).
- 21 October
  - Gordon Astall, 93, English footballer (Birmingham City, national team).
  - Frank Bough, 87, English television presenter (Grandstand).
- 24 October – Kevin McCarra, 62, Scottish sportswriter and journalist, complications from Alzheimer's disease.
- 25 October – Johnny Leeze, 78, English actor (Emmerdale, Coronation Street, The League of Gentlemen), COVID-19.
- 28 October – Bobby Ball, 76, English comedian (Cannon and Ball) actor (Last of the Summer Wine, Not Going Out) and television host, COVID-19.
- 29 October – J. J. Williams, 72, Welsh rugby union player (Llanelli, national team, British and Irish Lions).
- 30 October
  - David Shutt, Baron Shutt of Greetland, 78, politician, member of the House of Lords (since 2000) and Captain of the Yeomen of the Guard (2010–2012).
  - Nobby Stiles, 78, English footballer, manager, and 1966 World Cup winner (as a player). Played for Manchester United, Middlesbrough, and Preston North End.
  - Arthur Wills, organist and composer, 94
- 31 October – Sir Sean Connery, 90, Scottish actor (Dr. No, The Untouchables, The Hunt for Red October), Oscar winner (1987), heart failure and pneumonia.

=== November ===
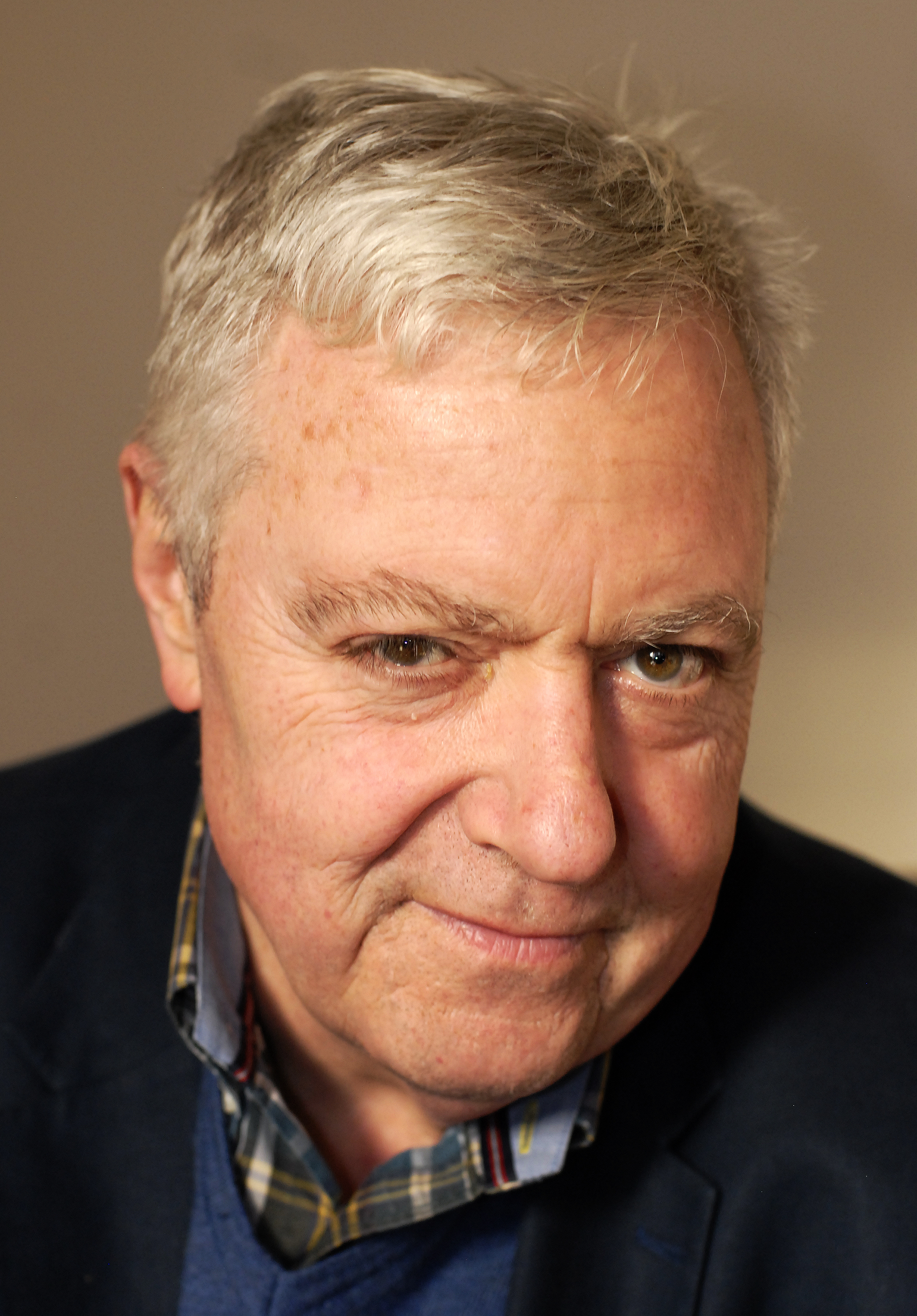
John Sessions in 2018

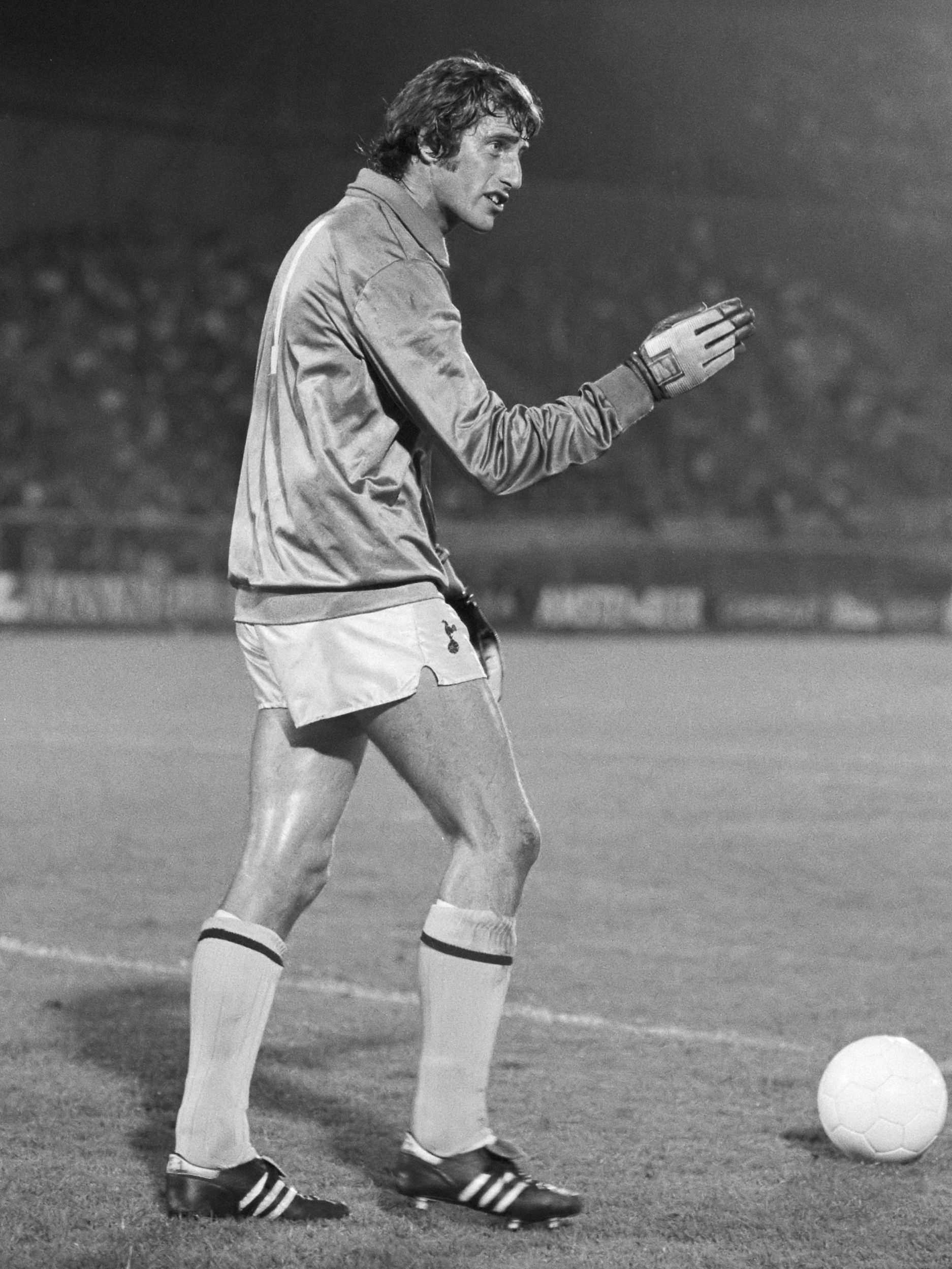
Ray Clemence in 1981

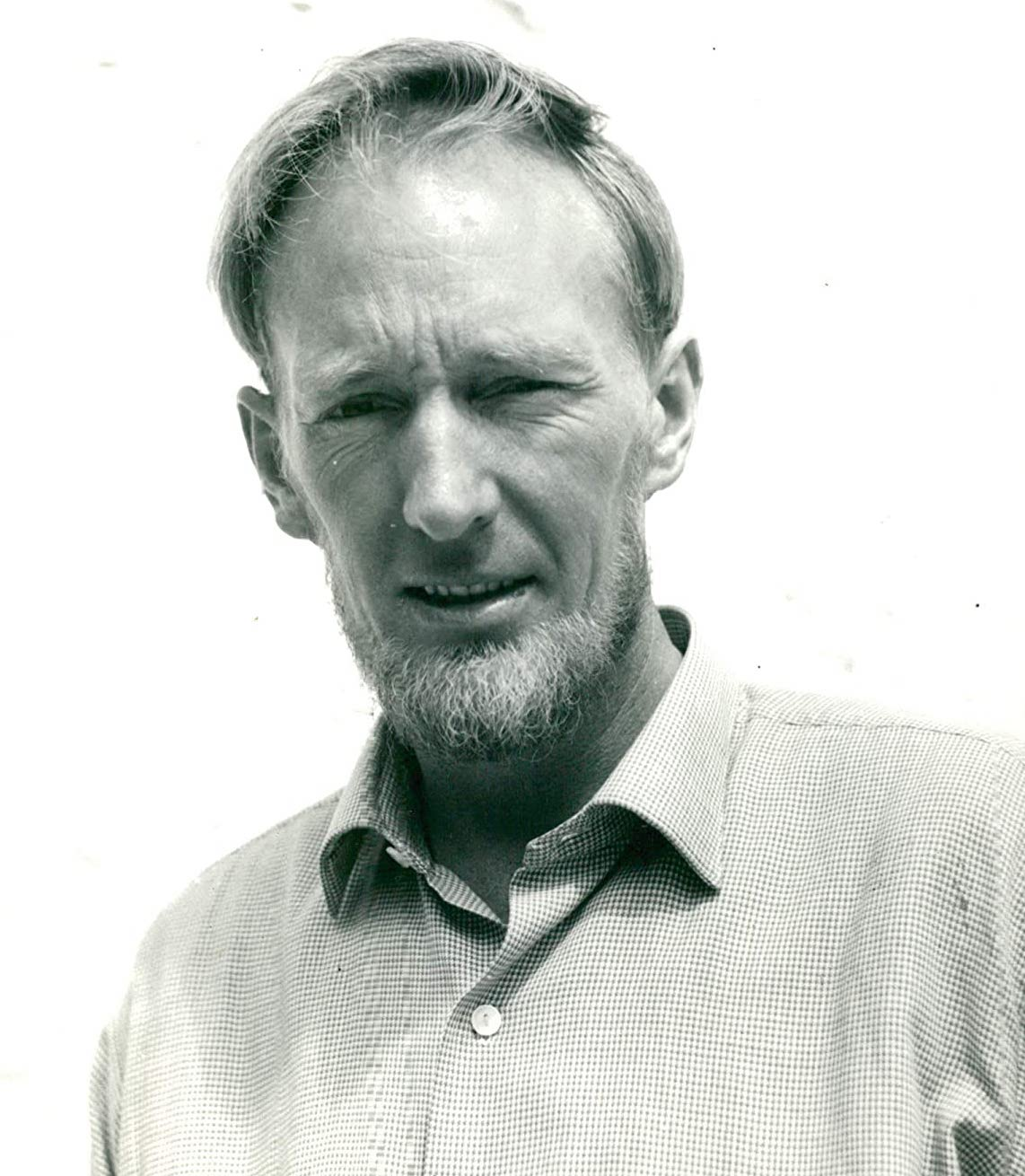
Hamish MacInnes

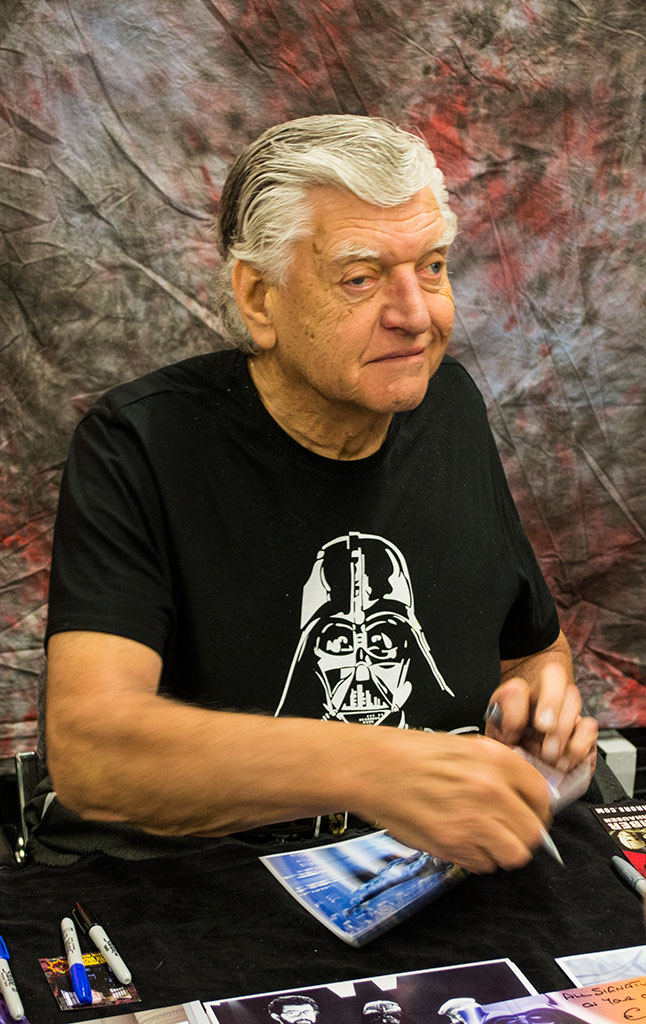
David Prowse in 2013

- 1 November – Lady Elizabeth Shakerley, 79, socialite.
- 2 November – John Sessions, 67, actor and comedian (Stella Street, Spitting Image, Whose Line Is It Anyway?), heart attack.
- 4 November
  - Ken Hensley, 75, English singer-songwriter (Uriah Heep, Blackfoot, Toe Fat).
  - Matt Tees, 81, Scottish footballer (Grimsby Town, Charlton Athletic, Airdrieonians).
- 5 November – Geoffrey Palmer, 93, English actor (As Time Goes By, Butterflies, The Fall and Rise of Reginald Perrin).
- 6 November – June Foulds, 86, sprint runner.
- 7 November
  - John Fraser, 89, Scottish actor (The Good Companions, The Trials of Oscar Wilde, Repulsion), cancer.
  - Jonathan Sacks, 72, Orthodox rabbi, Chief Rabbi of the United Synagogue (1991–2013) and member of the House of Lords (since 2013), cancer.
  - Sir Philip Lavallin Wroughton, 86, English businessman and public servant, Lord Lieutenant of Berkshire (1995–2008).
- 9 November – Robert Layton, classical musicologist and critic, 90
- 10 November
  - Graham Cowdrey, 56, English cricketer (Kent).
  - Tony Waiters, 83, English footballer (Macclesfield Town, Blackpool, Burnley, England) and manager (Plymouth Argyle, Vancouver Whitecaps, Canada).
- 11 November – Theresa Stewart, 90, English politician, Lord Mayor of Birmingham (2000–2001).
- 12 November
  - Alan Glazier, 81, English darts player.
  - Albert Quixall, 87, English footballer (Sheffield Wednesday, Manchester United, national team).
- 13 November
  - John Hays, 71, businessman, founder of Hays Travel.
  - Peter Sutcliffe, 74, English serial killer, COVID-19.
  - Sir John Meurig Thomas, 87, Welsh chemist and academic administrator, Director of the Royal Institution (1986–1991).
- 14 November
  - Des O'Connor, 88, English comedian, singer and television presenter, complications from a fall.
  - David Stoddart, Baron Stoddart of Swindon, 94, politician, MP (1970–1983) and member of the House of Lords (since 1983).
- 15 November
  - Ray Clemence, 72, English footballer (Scunthorpe United, Liverpool, Tottenham Hotspur, England), prostate cancer.
  - Campbell Forsyth, 86, Scottish footballer (St Mirren, Kilmarnock, Southampton).
  - Anne Rasa, 80, Welsh ethologist.
- 16 November – Eric Hall, 73, English football agent, COVID-19.
- 17 November – John Poole, 87, English footballer (Port Vale, Macclesfield Town).
- 18 November – Tony Hooper, 77, English singer-songwriter and musician (Strawbs).
- 19 November – Stan Trafford, 74, English footballer (Port Vale, Macclesfield Town) and cricketer (Staffordshire).
- 20 November
  - June Furlong, 90, English model.
  - Jan Morris, 94, Welsh historian and travel writer.
  - John Rowland, 79, English footballer (Nottingham Forest, Port Vale, Mansfield Town).
- 22 November
  - Paul Callan, 81, journalist (Evening Standard, Daily Mail, Daily Mirror), fall.
  - Hamish MacInnes, 90, Scottish mountaineer.
  - Ray Prosser, 93, Welsh rugby union player (Pontypool, British and Irish Lions, Barbarian).
  - Maurice Setters, 83, English footballer (West Bromwich Albion, Manchester United) and manager (Doncaster Rovers), complications from Alzheimer's disease.
- 28 November – David Prowse, 85, English bodybuilder, weightlifter and actor (Star Wars, A Clockwork Orange, Jabberwocky).

=== December ===
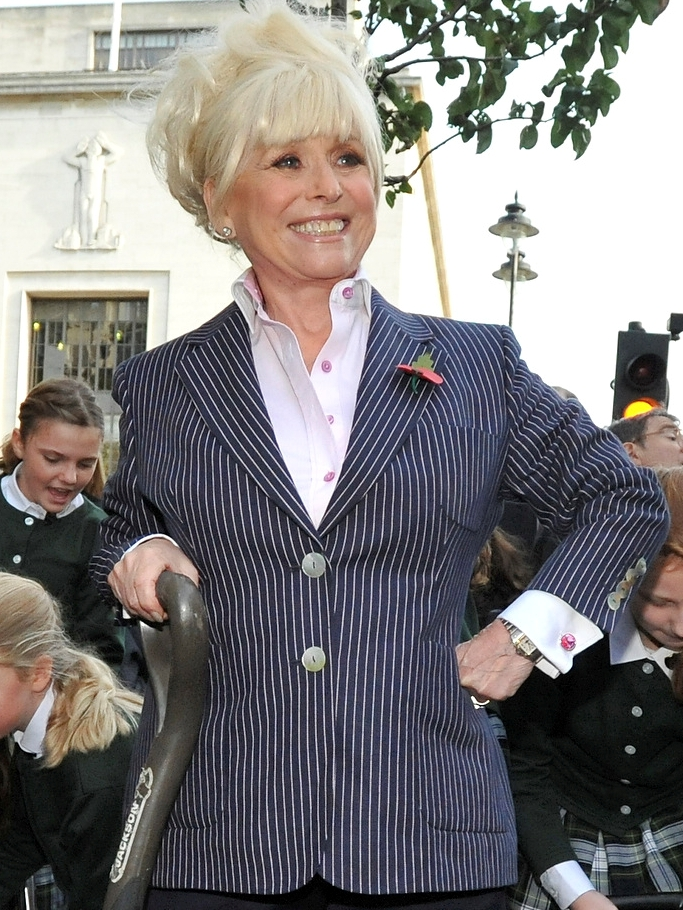
Dame Barbara Windsor in 2010

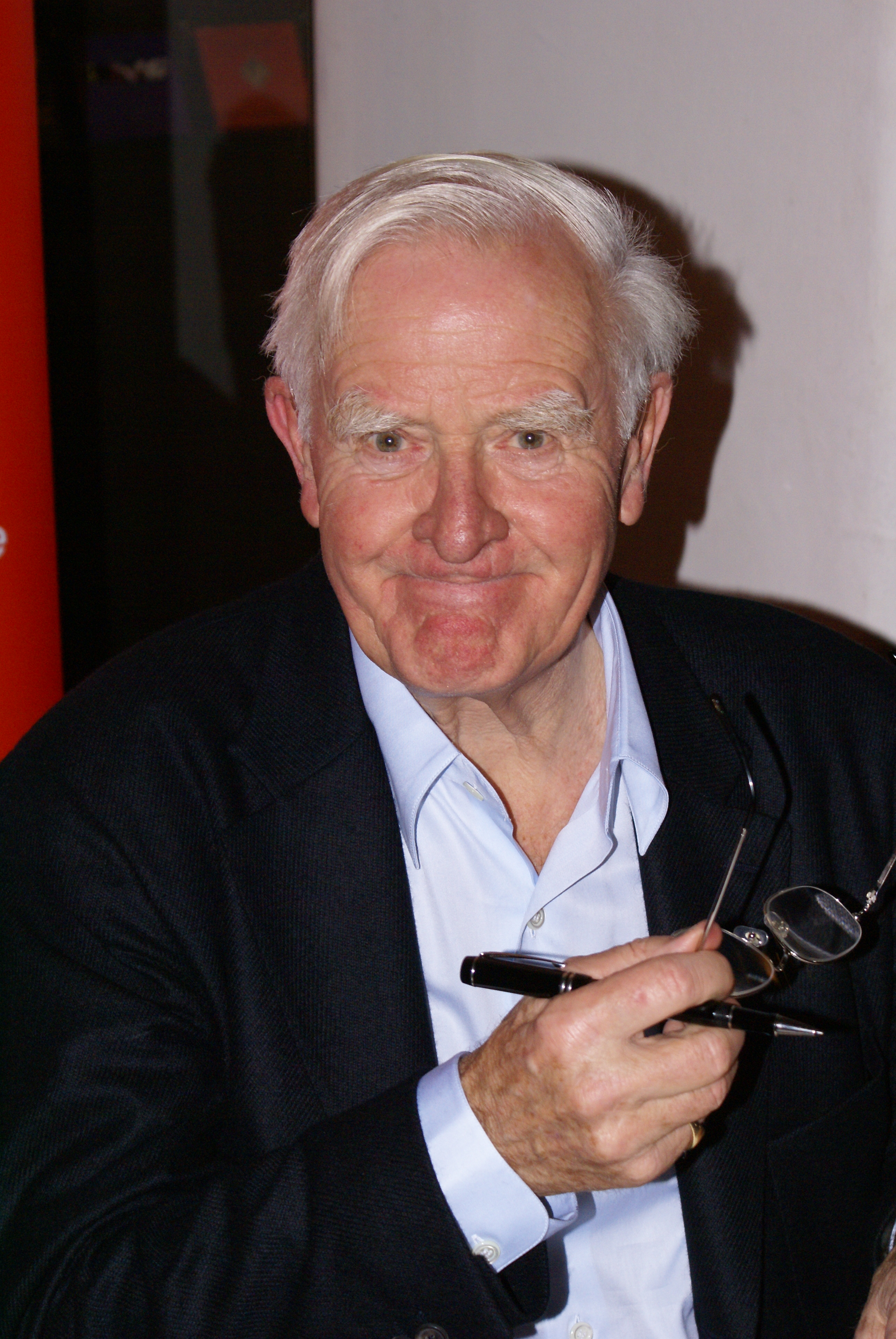
John le Carré in 2008

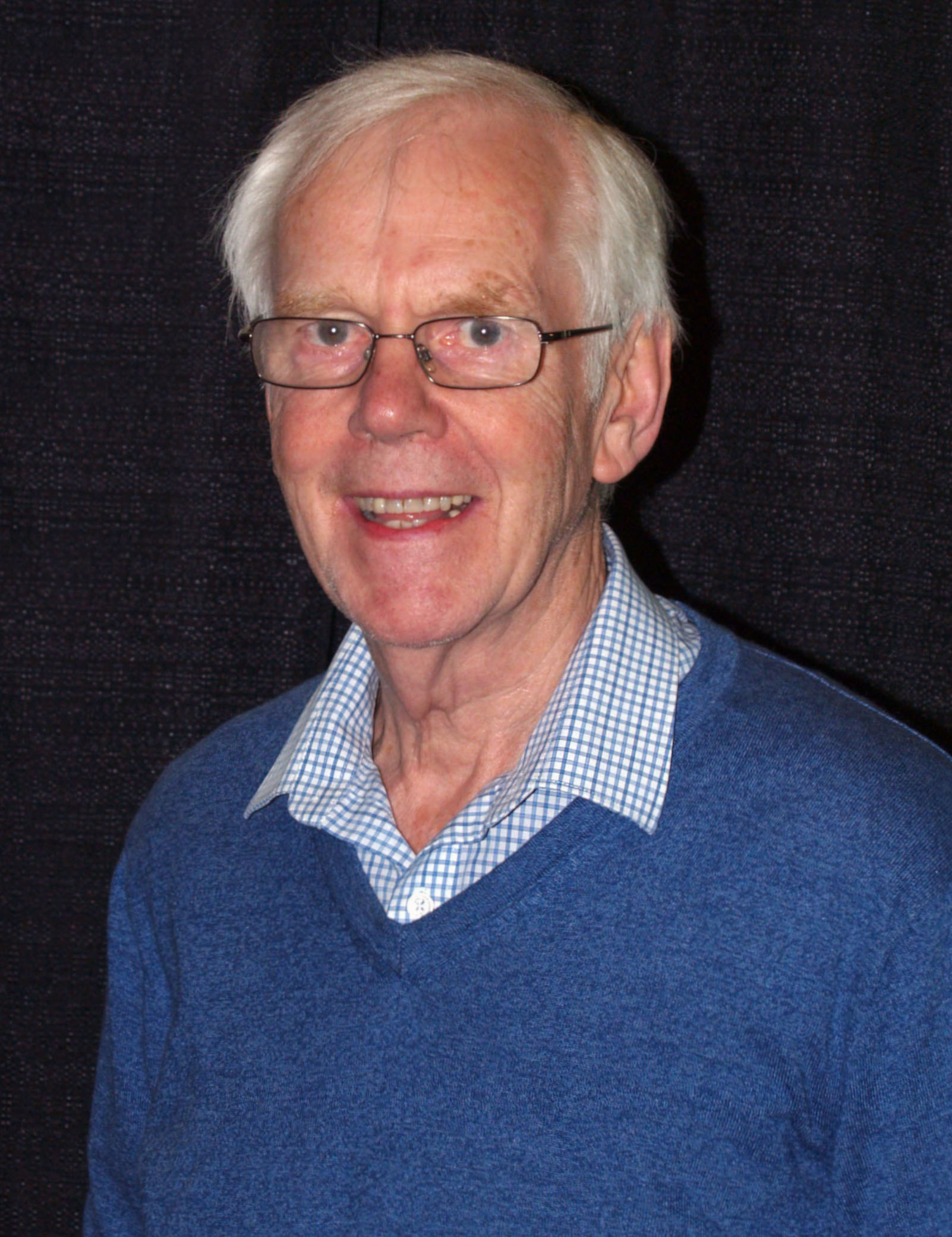
Jeremy Bulloch in 2016

- 1 December – Brian Kerr, Baron Kerr of Tonaghmore, 72, jurist, Lord Chief Justice of Northern Ireland (2004–2009) and Justice of the Supreme Court of the United Kingdom (2009–2020).
- 2 December – Hugh Keays-Byrne, 73, English-Australian actor (Mad Max, Stone, Rush, Sleeping Beauty, Mad Max: Fury Road) and film director.
- 3 December
  - Maria Fyfe, 82, Scottish politician, MP (1987–2001).
  - Bill Holmes, 94, English professional footballer (Doncaster Rovers, Blackburn Rovers, Bradford City)
  - Ron Mathewson, 76, Scottish jazz double bassist and bass guitarist, COVID-19.
  - Bobby Wishart, 87, Scottish footballer (Aberdeen, Dundee, Raith Rovers).
- 4 December
  - Jimmy Fletcher, 89, English former footballer (Gillingham)
  - Neville Wanless, 89, English broadcaster (ITV Tyne Tees).
- 5 December – Peter Alliss, 89, English professional golfer, television presenter, commentator, author and golf course designer.
- 7 December – Doug Scott, 79, English mountaineer and philanthropist, cerebral lymphoma.
- 8 December – Alejandro Sabella, 66, Argentine football player and manager (Argentina, Sheffield United, Leeds United)
- 10 December
  - Kenneth Alwyn, English orchestra conductor, composer and radio presenter, 95
  - Dame Barbara Windsor, 83, English actress (Carry On, EastEnders, Sparrows Can't Sing, Oh, What a Lovely War!), complications from Alzheimer's disease.
- 12 December – John le Carré, 89, British author (The Looking Glass War, Tinker Tailor Soldier Spy, The Honourable Schoolboy, Smiley's People, The Little Drummer Girl, The Night Manager, The Tailor of Panama, The Constant Gardener, A Most Wanted Man, Our Kind of Traitor).
- 14 December
  - Gerard Houllier, 73, French football manager and player (Liverpool, Aston Villa)
  - John McSeveney, 89, Scottish football player (Sunderland, Cardiff City, Newport County, Hull City) and manager (Barnsley)
- 17 December – Jeremy Bulloch, 75, English actor (Star Wars, The Spy Who Loved Me, Mary, Queen of Scots).
- 18 December – Steve Ingle, 74, English professional footballer (Bradford City, Southend United, Wrexham, Stockport County, Southport, Darlington)
- 20 December – Dame Fanny Waterman, 100, pianist and joint founder of the Leeds International Piano Competition.
- 21 December – John Fitzpatrick, 74, Scottish footballer (Manchester United)
- 22 December – Stella Tennant, 50, model and fashion designer.
- 23 December
  - Eddie McLaren, 91, Scottish professional footballer (Reading)
  - Kay Purcell, 57, English actress (Emmerdale, Tracy Beaker Returns, Waterloo Road), liver cancer.
- 24 December
  - Catherine Ennis, British organist, 65
  - Davie Sneddon, 84, Scottish football player and manager (Preston North End)
- 25 December – Martin Lambie-Nairn, 75, British graphic designer, co-creator of Spitting Image and creator of idents for BBC 2 and Channel 4.
- 26 December
  - George Blake, 98, spy and double agent
  - Jim McLean, 83, Scottish football player (Hamilton Academical, Clyde, Dundee, Kilmarnock), manager (Dundee United) and director
  - Chic McLelland, 63, Scottish football player (Aberdeen, Motherwell, Dundee, Montrose) and manager (Montrose)
  - Mike Sutton, 76, English professional footballer (Norwich City, Chester, Carlisle United)
- 27 December – Eddie Moss, 81, footballer (Southport)
- 28 December
  - George Hudson, 83, English professional footballer (Accrington Stanley, Peterborough United, Coventry City, Northampton Town, Tranmere Rovers)
  - Colin Withers, 80, English professional footballer (Birmingham City, Aston Villa, Lincoln City)
- 30 December – Ronald Atkins, 104, Welsh politician
- 31 December – Tommy Docherty, 92, Scottish football player (Preston North End, Arsenal, Chelsea) and manager (Chelsea, Rotherham United, Queens Park Rangers, Aston Villa, Manchester United, Derby County, Preston North End, Wolverhampton Wanderers)

== See also ==
- 2020 in British music
- 2020 in British radio
- 2020 in British television
- 2020s in United Kingdom political history
- COVID-19 pandemic in the United Kingdom
- United Kingdom commemorative stamps 2020–2029
- List of British films of 2020
- Politics of the United Kingdom
- Timeline of the COVID-19 pandemic in the United Kingdom (January–June 2020)
- Timeline of the COVID-19 pandemic in the United Kingdom (July–December 2020)
