= Deaths in May 2020 =

The following is a list of notable deaths in May 2020.

Entries for each day are listed alphabetically by surname. A typical entry lists information in the following sequence:

- Name, age, country of citizenship at birth, subsequent country of citizenship (if applicable), reason for notability, cause of death (if known), and reference.

== May 2020 ==
=== 1 ===
- Mathew Anikuzhikattil, 77, Indian Syro-Malabar Catholic hierarch, Bishop of Idukki (2003–2018).
- Allah Yar Ansari, 77, Pakistani politician, MPA (1997–1999), COVID-19.
- Beth Ashley, 93, American author and columnist.
- Else Blangsted, 99, German-born American music editor (The Goonies, Star Trek IV: The Voyage Home, The Color Purple).
- Chung Hae-won, 60, South Korean football player (Daewoo Royals, national team) and manager (Jeonnam Dragons), liver cancer.
- Gilbert Luis R. Centina III, 72, Filipino-American Roman Catholic poet, complications from COVID-19.
- Heyward Dotson, 71, American basketball player, liver failure.
- Lajos Engler, 91, Serbian basketball player (Partizan, Proleter Zrenjanin).
- Judith Esser-Mittag, 98, German gynecologist.
- Ruy Fausto, 85, Brazilian philosopher, heart attack.
- Deb Foskey, 70, Australian politician, ACT MLA (2004–2008), lung cancer.
- Anne Heaton, 89, British ballet dancer.
- Ben Hoekendijk, 81, Dutch evangelist.
- Sachiko Honda, 89, Japanese Go player.
- Butch Jelley, 79, American racing driver.
- Christophe Keckeis, 75, Swiss lieutenant general, Chief of the General Staff (2003) and Armed Forces (2004–2007).
- Matt Keough, 64, American baseball player (Oakland Athletics), pulmonary embolism.
- Silvia Legrand, 93, Argentine actress (Educating Niní, Seven Women).
- África Lorente Castillo, 65, Spanish politician, member of the Catalan parliament (1984–1988), COVID-19.
- Augustine Mahiga, 74, Tanzanian diplomat and politician, Minister of Justice (since 2019) and Permanent Representative to the UN (2003–2010).
- Elaine McCart, 91, American politician, member of the South Dakota Senate (1975–1976).
- Francis Megahy, 85, British film director (The Great Riviera Bank Robbery, Taffin), cancer.
- Patrick D. Miller, 84, American biblical scholar.
- Benjamín Moreno, 65, Spanish footballer (Leganés).
- Dolf Niezen, 94, Dutch footballer (ADO).
- Derek Ogg, 65, Scottish lawyer.
- Patrick W. O'Reilly, 95, American politician, member of the Arizona House of Representatives (1955–1956).
- Louis Pastore, 88, American politician, member of the Rhode Island Senate (1971–1976).
- Reuben Perach, 87, Israeli Olympic basketball player (1952).
- Tony Rand, 80, American politician, member of the North Carolina Senate (1981–1988, 1995–2009), skin and throat cancer.
- Samuel Rivera, 73, American politician, mayor of Passaic, New Jersey (2001–2008).
- Antonina Ryzhova, 85, Russian volleyball player, world champion (1956, 1960) and Olympic silver medallist (1964).
- Mutsuaki Sanada, 77, Japanese racing driver.
- Fernando Sandoval, 77, Brazilian Olympic water polo player (1968), complications from COVID-19.
- Simon Schenk, 73, Swiss ice hockey coach (national team) and politician, National Councillor (1994–2011).
- Nancy Stark Smith, 68, American contact improvisation dancer, ovarian cancer.
- Graham Stevenson, 69, British trade union leader, cancer.
- Tun Tin, 99, Burmese military officer and politician, Prime Minister (1988).
- Ryan Wetnight, 49, American football player (Chicago Bears, Green Bay Packers), stomach cancer.
- Georgios Zaimis, 82, Greek sailor, Olympic champion (1960).
- Pankaj Zaveri, 75, Indian cricketer (Gujarat).
- Sabine Zimmermann, 68, German TV presenter (Aktenzeichen XY… ungelöst).

=== 2 ===
- Justa Barrios, American home care worker and labor organizer, COVID-19. (death announced on this date)
- Morris Belzberg, 90, Canadian-born American businessman and sports team owner (Pittsburgh Penguins).
- Sue Bruce-Smith, 62, British film producer (Widows, Dirt Music, Dream Horse), cancer.
- Richie Cole, 72, American jazz saxophonist and composer.
- Oliver Crewe, 73, Irish Gaelic footballer.
- Jim Cross, 87, American ice hockey player and coach (University of Vermont), complications from COVID-19.
- Maurice Dayan, 85, French psychoanalyst.
- Louis Delsarte, 75, American artist.
- John Paul Eberhard, 93, American research architect and academic, complications of COVID-19 and congestive heart failure.
- Cady Groves, 30, American singer-songwriter.
- Jimmy Grundy, 97, American politician, member of the Kentucky House of Representatives (1956–1958).
- Shady Habash, 24, Egyptian media producer and political prisoner.
- Jim Henderson, 79, Canadian politician, Ontario MLA (1985–1995), complications from Parkinson's disease and COVID-19.
- Samuel Roger Horchow, 91, American theatre producer (Crazy for You) and mail order executive, cancer.
- Htay Kywe, 68, Burmese politician, MP (since 2016), cancer.
- Idir, 70, Algerian singer, pulmonary disease.
- George Kauffman, 89, American chemist.
- Jonathan Kelly, 72, Irish singer-songwriter.
- Daniel S. Kemp, 83, American organic chemist, COVID-19.
- Bing Liu, 37, American scientist, shot.
- Munir Mangal, 70, Afghan general, commander of the National Police, COVID-19.
- Ralph McGehee, 92, American intelligence officer, COVID-19.
- Bernard Nyarko, Ghanaian actor, colon cancer.
- John Ogilvie, 91, Scottish footballer (Hibernian, Leicester City, Mansfield Town), COVID-19.
- Meyer Rubin, 96, American geologist, COVID-19.
- Jan Saxl, 71, Czechoslovak-born British mathematician.
- Gil Schwartz, 68, American humor columnist (Fortune, Esquire), author and television executive (CBS), heart attack.
- Gilbert Sigrist, 82, French pianist.
- Gennadiy Solodov, 85, Russian Olympic racewalker (1960, 1964).
- Jan-Olof Strandberg, 93, Swedish actor (Wild Birds, Last Pair Out, Varning för Jönssonligan).
- Erik Tandberg, 87, Norwegian engineer and space educator.
- Ajay Kumar Tripathi, 62, Indian jurist, Chief Justice of Chhattisgarh High Court (2018–2019) and Judicial Member of Lokpal (since 2019), COVID-19 and heart attack.
- Arif Wazir, 37, Pakistani politician (Pashtun Tahafuz Movement), shot.

=== 3 ===
- Geoff Anderson, 81, New Zealand cricketer.
- H. Brandt Ayers, 85, American newspaper publisher and journalist.
- Victoria Barbă, 93, Moldovan animated film director.
- Selma Barkham, 93, Canadian maritime historian.
- Mohamed Ben Omar, 55, Nigerien politician, vice-president of the National Assembly (2009–2010, 2011–2016), founder and president of the PSD (since 2015), COVID-19.
- Stefan Burkart, 62, Swiss Olympic sprinter (1992, 1996) and sports coach.
- Paul Cholakis, 91, Canadian football player (Winnipeg Blue Bombers).
- Neil Davidson, 62, Scottish historian.
- Q. Todd Dickinson, 67, American lawyer, director of the U.S. Patent and Trademark Office (1999–2001).
- Ömer Döngeloğlu, 52, Turkish theologian, writer and broadcaster, COVID-19.
- Rosalind Elias, 90, American operatic mezzo-soprano, heart failure.
- John Ericson, 93, German-born American actor (Bedknobs and Broomsticks, 7 Faces of Dr. Lao, Honey West), pneumonia.
- Sir Peter Froggatt, 91, Northern Irish academic administrator and epidemiologist.
- Dave Greenfield, 71, English keyboardist (The Stranglers), heart disease and COVID-19.
- Tendol Gyalzur, 68, Tibetan-Swiss humanitarian, COVID-19.
- Bill Hull, 79, American football player (Dallas Texans).
- Pavle Jovanovic, 43, Serbian-American Olympic bobsledder (2006), suicide.
- Eugene Kostyra, 72, Canadian politician, Manitoba MLA (1981–1988).
- Roy Lester, 96, American football player (West Virginia) and coach (Richard Montgomery, Maryland), complications from COVID-19.
- John Mahon, 82, American actor (Zodiac, Armageddon, L.A. Confidential).
- K. S. Nissar Ahmed, 84, Indian poet and writer, cancer.
- Chanut Piyaoui, 95, Thai hotelier, founder of Dusit International.
- John Ridley, 68, English footballer (Port Vale, Leicester City, Chesterfield).
- Rick Roberson, 72, American basketball player (Los Angeles Lakers, Cleveland Cavaliers, Portland Trail Blazers).
- Salty Saltwell, 96, American baseball general manager (Chicago Cubs).
- John Hugh Seiradakis, 72, Greek astronomer, co-founder of the European Astronomical Society, complications from cancer.
- Phil Smith, 88, American politician, member of the Alabama House of Representatives (1967–1975).
- Frederick C. Tillis, 90, American jazz saxophonist and composer.
- June A. Willenz, 95, American military veterans advocate, heart attack.
- Nancy Workman, 79, American politician, Mayor of Salt Lake County (2000–2004).
- Zhang Qian'er, 91, Chinese chemist, member of the Chinese Academy of Sciences.

=== 4 ===
- Aldir Blanc, 73, Brazilian songwriter, COVID-19.
- James Malone Coleman, 90, American Episcopal Bishop of West Tennessee (1994–2001).
- Najaf Daryabandari, 90, Iranian translator and writer.
- Norma Doggett, 94, American actress (Seven Brides for Seven Brothers).
- Baldwin Domingo, 93, American aviation historian and politician, member of the New Hampshire House of Representatives (1998–2000, 2004–2012).
- Jean Erdman, 104, American dancer and choreographer.
- Maria Galitzine, 31, Luxembourgish-born Russian interior designer and princess, cardiac aneurysm.
- Marvin Hershkowitz, 89, American basketball player.
- Motoko Fujishiro Huthwaite, 92, American preservationist, last surviving female Monuments Men, COVID-19.
- Gunnar Larsson, 80, Swedish sports administrator, COVID-19.
- Michael Lucas, 96, Slovak-born Canadian political activist.
- Michael McClure, 87, American poet and writer, complications from a stroke.
- Flávio Migliaccio, 85, Brazilian film director (The Beggars) and actor (My Home Is Copacabana, The Hour and Turn of Augusto Matraga), suicide by hanging.
- Anna Mohr, 75, Swedish archaeologist, COVID-19.
- Lorne Munroe, 95, Canadian-born American cellist.
- Garba Nadama, 82, Nigerian politician, Governor of Sokoto (1982–1983).
- Lucila Santos Trujillo, 91, Ecuadorian First Lady (1966–1968).
- Don Shula, 90, American Hall of Fame football player (Cleveland Browns, Baltimore Colts) and coach (Miami Dolphins).
- Marion Hartzog Smoak, 103, American politician, Chief of Protocol (1972–1974) and South Carolina state senator (1967–1968).
- Alan Sutherland, 76, New Zealand rugby union player (Marlborough, national team).
- Álvaro Teherán, 54, Colombian basketball player (Baloncesto Málaga, Fort Wayne Fury, KK Olimpija), kidney failure.
- Froilan Tenorio, 80, Northern Marianan politician, Governor (1994–1998) and Resident Representative (1984–1990).
- Dragan Vučić, 64, Macedonian composer and singer, COVID-19.
- Cedric Xulu, 80, South African footballer (AmaZulu F.C.), cancer.
- Greg Zanis, 69, American carpenter and activist, bladder cancer.

=== 5 ===
- Sergei Adian, 89, Russian mathematician (Adian–Rabin theorem).
- Renee Amoore, 67, American politician and health care consultant, deputy chair of the Republican State Committee of Pennsylvania (since 1996).
- Sweet Pea Atkinson, 74, American singer (Was (Not Was)), heart attack.
- Brian Axsmith, 57, American paleobotanist, COVID-19.
- Johanna Bassani, 18, Austrian Nordic combined skier, Youth Olympic silver medalist (2020), suicide.
- Wayne Burkes, 90, American politician and lieutenant general, member of the Mississippi House of Representatives (1976–1980) and Senate (1980–1990).
- Sonny Cox, 82, American saxophonist and basketball coach (King College Prep).
- Max Crellin, 86, Australian politician, member of the Victorian Legislative Assembly (1970–1982).
- John Dallat, 73, Irish politician, MLA (1998–2016, 2017–2020), cancer.
- Claud M. Davis, 95, American engineer.
- Stéphane Dupont, 70, Belgian radio host and producer.
- Mohamed al-Tablawi, 85, Egyptian Quran reciter, Head of syndicate of Quran Reciters (2011–2020).
- John Arthur Ferch, 84, American diplomat.
- Bradley Fields, 68, American magician, COVID-19.
- Michael Friedman, 59, American author and poet, cancer.
- Jan Halvarsson, 77, Swedish cross-county skier, Olympic silver medallist (1968).
- George Henderson, 84, Canadian politician, member of the House of Commons (1980–1988).
- Kjell Karlsen, 88, Norwegian composer and bandleader.
- Didi Kempot, 53, Indonesian campursari singer, heart attack.
- Kiing Shooter, 27, American rapper, liver failure reportedly complicated by COVID-19.
- Diran Manoukian, 101, French Olympic field hockey player (1948, 1952, 1960).
- Ann McBride Norton, 75, American activist and businesswoman.
- Charles Nowosielski, 66, Scottish theatre director.
- Azimulhaq Pahalwan, 54, Indian politician, Uttar Pradesh MLA (since 2012), complications from diabetes.
- Ciro Pessoa, 62, Brazilian singer (Titãs, Cabine C), songwriter ("Sonífera Ilha"), journalist and poet, complications from cancer and COVID-19.
- Connie Rea, 89, American basketball player (Baltimore Bullets).
- Thomas Reppetto, 88, American police officer and author.
- Alfred "Uganda" Roberts, 77, American percussionist (Professor Longhair, Dr. John), lung cancer.
- Paulette Sarcey, 96, French resistance fighter.
- Mimmo Sepe, 65, Italian comedian.
- Millie Small, 72, Jamaican singer ("My Boy Lollipop"), stroke.
- J. Denis Summers-Smith, 99, British ornithologist and engineer.
- André Ungar, 90, Hungarian-born British Jewish philosopher.

=== 6 ===
- Jane Alexander, 90, American politician, member of the Pennsylvania House of Representatives (1965).
- Norbert Balatsch, 92, Austrian choral conductor (Vienna State Opera, Bayreuth Festival), Grammy winner (1981, 2002).
- Hamid Bernaoui, 82, Algerian footballer (USM Alger).
- Sir John Birch, 84, British diplomat, ambassador to Hungary (1989–1995), cancer.
- Chrystelle Trump Bond, 82, American dancer, choreographer and author.
- Dmitry Bosov, 52, Russian natural resource executive, head of supervisory board of HC Sibir Novosibirsk, suicide by gunshot.
- Thomas Clark, 93, American politician, Mayor of Long Beach, California (1975–1980, 1982–1984).
- Paul Doyle, 80, American baseball player (Atlanta Braves, California Angels, San Diego Padres).
- Carlos Ernesto Escobar Mejía, 57, Salvadoran-born American immigrant, COVID-19.
- Dalit Ezhilmalai, 74, Indian politician, MP (since 1998).
- Barry Farber, 90, American Hall of Fame radio talk show host, linguist, and author.
- Herbert Frankenhauser, 74, German politician, MP (1990–2013).
- Redmond Gleeson, 85, Irish-born American actor (Dreamscape, Bulletproof, Young Guns II).
- Brian Howe, 66, English rock singer (Bad Company), heart attack.
- John Laver, 82, Indian-born British phonetician.
- Jean Le Dû, 82, French linguist.
- Darby McCarthy, 76, Australian jockey.
- Cameron McGlenn, 32, American arena football player (New Orleans VooDoo, Iowa Barnstormers), traffic collision.
- Habibur Rahman Mollah, 78, Bangladeshi politician, MP (1996–2001, since 2008), kidney disease.
- Paddy Molloy, 85–86, Irish hurler (Offaly, Drumcullen).
- Riyaz Naikoo, 35, Indian pro-Pakistani militant, shot.
- Karen Neander, 66, American philosopher, cancer.
- Antonio Piraíno, 91, Chilean Olympic equestrian (1968).
- Leslie Pope, 65, American set decorator (Seabiscuit, Django Unchained, Avengers: Endgame).
- Mary Pratt, 101, American baseball player (Rockford Peaches, Kenosha Comets).
- Nahum Rabinovitch, 92, Canadian-born Israeli Orthodox rabbi and posek, head of Yeshivat Birkat Moshe.
- Jacques Reymond, 69, Swiss ski trainer, COVID-19.
- Vladimir Simonov, 84, Russian design engineer.
- Martin Spellman, 94, American child actor.
- Supreme, 49, American professional wrestler, heart attack.

=== 7 ===
- Alfonsas Ambraziūnas, 86, Lithuanian sculptor (Ninth Fort memorial).
- Maria Teresa Beccari, 69, Sanmarinese politician, mayor of City of San Marino (2009–2018).
- Vladimir Belyaev, 79, Ukrainian Olympic weightlifter.
- Steve Blackmore, 58, Welsh rugby union player (national team), brain cancer.
- Brian Bolus, 86, English cricketer (Yorkshire, Nottinghamshire, national team).
- Princess Diana of Bourbon-Parma, 87, French royal, COVID-19.
- Daniel Cauchy, 90, French film actor (Bob le flambeur, D'où viens-tu Johnny?, The Troops of St. Tropez) and producer, complications from COVID-19.
- Terry Clark, 101, British Royal Air Force officer (The Few).
- E. Wayne Craven, 89, American art historian, complications from COVID-19.
- Joyce Davidson, 89, Canadian television presenter, COVID-19.
- Peque Gallaga, 76, Filipino film director (Oro, Plata, Mata, Scorpio Nights, Magic Temple), screenwriter and actor, pneumonia.
- İbrahim Gökçek, 41, Turkish bass player (Grup Yorum), starvation following hunger strike.
- Antonio González Pacheco, 73, Spanish Francoist police inspector (Political-Social Brigade), COVID-19.
- Andre Harrell, 59, American record producer, founder of Uptown Records, heart failure.
- Leighton Jenkins, 88, Welsh rugby union player.
- Manuel Jove, 78, Spanish businessman, founder of Fadesa.
- Abdiwali Olad Kanyare, 39, Somali footballer (Horseed, national team), shot.
- Margaret Loutit, 90, Australian-born New Zealand microbiologist.
- Daisy Lúcidi, 90, Brazilian actress (Paraíso Tropical, Babilônia, Passione), COVID-19.
- John Macurdy, 91, American operatic bass.
- Cecil Maguire, 90, Irish painter.
- Elliott Mendelson, 88, American logician.
- Sylvia Ostry, 92, Canadian economist.
- Darrin Patrick, 49, American author and megachurch pastor, suicide by gunshot.
- Eugenio Ravignani, 87, Italian Roman Catholic prelate, Bishop of Vittorio Veneto (1983–1997) and Trieste (1997–2009).
- Richard Sala, 65, American cartoonist.
- Mike Storen, 84, American basketball executive (Indiana Pacers, Atlanta Hawks), commissioner of the ABA, complications from cancer.
- Arnold Stulce, 95, American politician, member of the Tennessee House of Representatives (1993–1996).
- Ty, 47, British rapper, pneumonia and COVID-19.
- Maks Velo, 84, French-born Albanian artist.
- Carolyn Welch, 97, American figure skater.
- Emile Wijntuin, 95, Surinamese politician, Chairman of the Staten (1973–1975) and of the National Assembly (1975–1980).
- Dan Wood, 73, American soccer coach and golfer.
- Joseph Zhu Baoyu, 98, Chinese Roman Catholic prelate, Bishop of Nanyang (2002–2010).

=== 8 ===
- Mark Barkan, 85, American songwriter ("Pretty Flamingo", "The Tra La La Song (One Banana, Two Banana)", "She's a Fool").
- Harry Berg, 76, American politician, member of the Montana Senate (1981–1985).
- Lúcia Braga, 85, Brazilian politician, Deputy (1987–1995, 2003–2007), COVID-19.
- Aart Brederode, 78, Dutch Olympic hockey player (1968).
- Tomás Carlovich, 74, Argentine footballer (Rosario Central, Central Córdoba, Independiente Rivadavia), brain injury from fall during beating.
- Jesus Chediak, 78, Brazilian actor, director and producer, COVID-19.
- Sigma Faye Coran, 54, American rabbi, breast cancer.
- J. J. Cribbin, 73, Irish Gaelic footballer (Ballyhaunis, Mayo).
- Vicente André Gomes, 68, Brazilian politician, Deputy (1995–1999), complications from COVID-19.
- Yuri Gryadunov, 90, Russian diplomat, ambassador to Jordan (1990–1992).
- W. K. Hicks, 77, American football player (Houston Oilers, New York Jets).
- James Hill, 89, New Zealand Olympic rower (1956, 1960).
- Roy Horn, 75, German-American magician (Siegfried & Roy), COVID-19.
- Ben Johnson, 88, American baseball player (Chicago Cubs).
- Dimitris Kremastinos, 78, Greek politician, MP (2000–2004, 2009–2019) and Minister of Health (1993–1996), COVID-19.
- Adi Kurdi, 71, Indonesian actor (3 Hari Untuk Selamanya, Aku Ingin Menciummu Sekali Saja).
- Thomas A. Lipo, 82, American electrical engineer.
- Byron Mallott, 77, American politician and Tlingit elder, Lieutenant Governor of Alaska (2014–2018), heart attack.
- Nancy Morin, 44, Canadian goalball player.
- Dave Nakdimen, 86, American broadcaster.
- Jack Nielsen, 96, Norwegian Olympic alpine skier.
- József Piroska, 89, Hungarian Olympic alpine skier.
- Cécile Rol-Tanguy, 101, French resistance officer.
- Iepe Rubingh, 45, Dutch performance artist, co-founder of chess boxing.
- Thérence Sinunguruza, 60, Burundian politician, MP (2005–2010), Permanent Representative to the UN (1993–1994) and Vice-President (2010–2013).
- Carl Tighe, 70, British author and academic, COVID-19.
- Ritva Valkama, 87, Finnish actress (Häpy Endkö? Eli kuinka Uuno Turhapuro sai niin kauniin ja rikkaan vaimon, Herr Puntila and His Servant Matti, Borrowing Matchsticks).

=== 9 ===
- Johannes Beck, 97, German Jesuit priest and social ethicist, COVID-19.
- Robert Bru, 89, French rugby union coach (Stade Toulousain, RC Narbonne).
- Tony Carrillo, 83, American politician, member of the Arizona House of Representatives (1963–1969).
- Arthur Dignam, 80, Australian actor (The Devil's Playground, Summer of Secrets, Strange Behavior).
- Georges Domercq, 89, French rugby union referee and politician, mayor of Bellocq (1971–2014).
- Brooks Douglass, 56, American politician, member of the Oklahoma Senate (1990–2002), cancer.
- Freda Gardner, 91, American religion academic.
- Nelson Henry, 96, American Army private.
- Timo Honkela, 57, Finnish computer scientist.
- Carlos José, 85, Brazilian singer-songwriter, complications from COVID-19.
- Kari Karanko, 79, Finnish diplomat.
- Rich Kreitling, 84, American football player (Cleveland Browns).
- Ahmad Kurd, 70, Palestinian politician, mayor of Deir al-Balah (since 2005), stroke.
- Pedro Pablo León, 76, Peruvian footballer (Alianza Lima, Barcelona de Ecuador, national team), pneumonia and kidney failure.
- Little Richard, 87, American Hall of Fame rock and roll singer ("Tutti Frutti", "Long Tall Sally", "Lucille"), pianist and songwriter, bone cancer.
- Winona Littleheart, 64, American professional wrestler and valet (NWA, WWF), kidney disease.
- Kristina Lugn, 71, Swedish poet and writer, member of the Swedish Academy.
- Lidia Marchetti, 80, Italian basketball player.
- Johnny McCarthy, 86, American basketball player (Cincinnati Royals, St. Louis Hawks, Boston Celtics).
- Abraham Palatnik, 92, Brazilian kinetic artist, COVID-19.
- Jorma Rissanen, 87, Finnish information theorist.
- Jaquelin T. Robertson, 88, American architect and urban planner, Alzheimer's disease.
- Geno Silva, 72, American actor (Scarface, Amistad, Key West), complications from frontotemporal degeneration.
- Alan David White, 96, American physicist.

=== 10 ===
- Aldo Bassi, 58, Italian jazz trumpeter.
- David H. Bayley, 87, American political scientist and criminologist.
- David Corrêa, 82, Brazilian singer-songwriter, kidney failure brought on by COVID-19.
- Lloyd Criss, 79, American politician, member of the Texas House of Representatives (1979–1991), anemia.
- Lynn Deas, 67, American bridge player.
- Charley Diamond, 83, American football player (BC Lions, Dallas Texans/Kansas City Chiefs).
- Peter Elsbach, 95, Dutch physician.
- Fritz Gerber, 91, Swiss business executive (Roche Holding AG, Zurich Insurance).
- Sai Gundewar, 42, Indian actor (David, I, Me Aur Main, Baazaar), brain cancer.
- Anna Handzlová, Czech orienteer.
- Ha Ui-kon, 77, South Korean Olympic basketball player.
- Trivo Inđić, 82, Serbian political advisor and diplomat, ambassador to Spain (2001–2004).
- Neville Jayaweera, 89, Sri Lankan-English radio executive and civil servant.
- Athar Shah Khan Jaidi, 76, Pakistani writer and actor, complications from a stroke.
- Frances Kinne, 102, American educator, President of Jacksonville University (1979–1989).
- Georgia Litwack, 98, American photographer, complications from COVID-19.
- José López Calo, 98, Spanish musicologist and priest.
- Arva Moore Parks McCabe, 81, American historian and preservationist.
- John McKenzie, 65, British bass guitarist.
- Jack Mundey, 90, Australian trade unionist and environmental activist.
- Khairi Nazarova, 90, Tajik actress and politician.
- Nita Pippins, 93, American registered nurse and AIDS activist, COVID-19.
- Sonny Parsons, 61, Filipino actor (Sparrow Unit, Agila) and singer (Hagibis), heart attack.
- Martin Pasko, 65, Canadian-born American comic book writer (Superman, E-Man) and screenwriter (Batman: Mask of the Phantasm).
- Sérgio Sant'Anna, 78, Brazilian writer, COVID-19.
- Djoko Santoso, 67, Indonesian military officer, Army Chief of Staff (2005–2007) and Commander of the Armed Forces (2007–2010), complications from surgery.
- Barbara Sher, 84, American motivational speaker and author.
- Yogendra Singh, 87, Indian sociologist, heart attack.
- John Teerlinck, 69, American football player (San Diego Chargers) and coach (Denver Broncos, Indianapolis Colts).
- Hari Vasudevan, 68, Indian historian, COVID-19.
- Mare Vint, 77, Estonian graphic artist.
- Abdikani Mohamed Wa'ays, Somalian diplomat, Ambassador to Egypt and envoy to the Arab League, COVID-19.
- Betty Wright, 66, American soul and R&B singer ("Clean Up Woman"), Grammy winner (1976), cancer.
- Abraham Yakin, 95, Israeli artist.

=== 11 ===
- Francisco Aguilar, 71, Spanish footballer (Real Madrid, Rayo Vallecano, national team).
- Louis Baise, 93, South African Olympic wrestler.
- Alberto Carpani, 64, Italian singer, COVID-19.
- Paloma Cordero, 82, Mexican socialite, First Lady (1982–1988).
- Ewie Cronje, 80, South African cricketer.
- Herbert Dardik, 84, American vascular surgeon.
- Terry Erwin, 79, American entomologist.
- Will Forsyth, 24, English rugby league footballer (Dewsbury Rams), cancer.
- Hutton Gibson, 101, American sedevacantism writer and Holocaust denier.
- Larry Gowell, 72, American baseball player (New York Yankees), heart attack.
- Thorkild Grosbøll, 72, Danish Lutheran clergyman.
- Victor J. Hugo Jr., 88, American major general.
- Anne Kernan, 87, Irish particle physicist.
- Christian Kieckens, 69, Belgian architect and photographer.
- Roy L. Kline, 105, American brigadier general.
- Oleg Kovalyov, 71, Russian politician, governor of Ryazan Oblast (2008–2017).
- Moon Martin, 69, American singer-songwriter ("Bad Case of Loving You (Doctor, Doctor)", "X-Ray Vision").
- Doug McKay, 90, Canadian ice hockey player (Detroit Red Wings).
- Ann Katharine Mitchell, 97, British cryptanalyst and psychologist, COVID-19.
- Petr Nemšovský, 77, Slovak-born Czech triple jumper.
- Jean Nichol, 75, Canadian singer.
- Ietje Paalman-de Miranda, 85, Surinamese born Dutch mathematician and professor.
- Roland Povinelli, 78, French politician, Senator (2008–2014), mayor of Allauch (since 1975), heart attack.
- Zdeněk Pýcha, 93, Czech Olympic ice hockey player.
- James R. Redmond, 91, American zoologist.
- Andrea Rinaldi, 19, Italian footballer (Atalanta), brain aneurysm.
- Gregorio Scalise, 80, Italian poet.
- Zay N. Smith, 71, American journalist (Chicago Sun-Times), lung cancer.
- Thyra Stevenson, 75, American politician, member of the Idaho House of Representatives (2012–2014, since 2016), heart attack.
- Jerry Stiller, 92, American actor (Seinfeld, The King of Queens) and comedian (Stiller and Meara).
- Miloslav Stingl, 89, Czech ethnologist and author.
- Bill Stone, 83, American nephrologist.
- Susan Subtle, 78, American art curator and columnist.
- Tissa Wijesurendra, 71, Sri Lankan actor (Christhu Charithaya, Dadabima, Rupantharana).
- Don Zimmerman, 70, American football player (Philadelphia Eagles).

=== 12 ===
- George Akiyama, 77, Japanese manga artist (Zeni Geba, Haguregumo).
- John Beattie, 87, Australian politician, Tasmanian MHA (1972–1989).
- Frank Bolle, 95, American cartoonist (Winnie Winkle, The Heart of Juliet Jones).
- Guillermo Capobianco, 74, Bolivian politician.
- Felice Cece, 84, Italian Roman Catholic prelate, Bishop of Teano-Calvi (1984–1989) and Archbishop of Sorrento-Castellammare di Stabia (1989–2012).
- Renée Claude, 80, Canadian actress (It's Your Turn, Laura Cadieux, Avec un grand A, He Shoots, He Scores) and singer, COVID-19.
- Henriette Conté, Guinean socialite, First Lady (1984–2008).
- Johnnie H. Corns, 84, American lieutenant general.
- Renato Corti, 84, Italian Roman Catholic cardinal, Bishop of Novara (1990–2011).
- S. David Freeman, 94, American engineer, author and attorney, chairman of the TVA, NYPA and LADWP, heart attack.
- Richard Gilder, 87, American brokerage executive and philanthropist.
- David Green, 84, English cricketer (Derbyshire).
- Morris Hood III, 54, American politician, member of the Michigan House of Representatives (2003–2008) and Senate (2011–2018), COVID-19.
- Bernard Jones, 86, English footballer (Northampton Town, Shrewsbury Town, Cardiff City).
- Sisavath Keobounphanh, 92, Laotian military officer and politician, Vice President (1996–1998) and Prime Minister (1998–2001).
- Astrid Kirchherr, 81, German photographer (The Beatles), cancer.
- Claus Larsen, 65, Danish footballer (Køge BK, KB, national team).
- Thomas M. Liggett, 76, American mathematician.
- George Mikell, 91, Lithuanian-Australian actor (Kill Her Gently, The Guns of Navarone, The Great Escape).
- Clarence Mini, 68, South African doctor and human rights activist, COVID-19.
- Radim Novák, 42, Czech footballer (FK Litvínov, FK Ústí nad Labem), pancreatic cancer.
- Michel Piccoli, 94, French actor (La Grande Bouffe, A Leap in the Dark, We Have a Pope), stroke.
- Philippe Redon, 69, French footballer (Stade Rennais, Paris Saint-Germain, Stade Lavallois).
- Carolyn Reidy, 71, American publisher, CEO of Simon & Schuster, heart attack.
- Giulio Savelli, 78, Italian publisher and politician, Deputy (1996–2001).
- Farzad Sharifian, Iranian-born Australian linguist.
- Edin Sprečo, 73, Bosnian footballer (Željezničar, Iskra Bugojno, Yugoslavia national team).
- Aimee Stephens, 59, American funeral director and transgender rights activist, kidney failure.
- Ernest Vinberg, 82, Russian mathematician (Vinberg's algorithm, Koecher–Vinberg theorem), complications from COVID-19.

=== 13 ===
- Afwerki Abraha, 71, Eritrean diplomat, COVID-19.
- Francis Andersen, 94, Australian scholar.
- Ágnes Babos, 76, Hungarian handball player, world champion (1965).
- Gabriel Bacquier, 95, French operatic baritone.
- Anthony Bailey, 87, English writer and art historian, COVID-19.
- Walter Bingham, 89, American sportswriter and golf historian, chronic lymphocytic leukemia.
- Jean Lau Chin, 75, American clinical psychologist, COVID-19.
- Tom Cox, 57, American football player.
- Jack Delveaux, 83, American football player (Winnipeg Blue Bombers).
- Gérard Dionne, 100, Canadian Roman Catholic prelate, Bishop of Edmundston (1983–1993).
- Malibongwe Gcwabe, 55, South African gospel singer, asthma attack.
- Gaetano Gorgoni, 86, Italian politician, Deputy (1983–1994).
- Rolf Hochhuth, 89, German author and playwright (The Deputy).
- Riad Ismat, 72, Syrian writer and theatre director, Minister of Culture (2010–2012), COVID-19.
- Shobushi Kanji, 28, Japanese sumo wrestler, COVID-19-related pneumonia.
- Chedli Klibi, 94, Tunisian politician, Minister of Culture (1961–1970, 1971–1973, 1976–1978) and Secretary General of the Arab League (1979–1990).
- Giorgio Kutufà, 72, Italian politician, President of the province of Livorno (2004–2014).
- Derek Lawrence, 78, English record producer (Deep Purple, Wishbone Ash).
- Clive Limpkin, 82, British photojournalist.
- Keith Lyons, 68, Welsh-born Australian sports scientist.
- Michael Madhu, 50, Indian actor (Bhajarangi, Shhh!, Ashwamedha), heart attack.
- John O'Brien, 88, Australian Olympic water polo player (1956, 1960).
- Jeremiah F. O'Connor, 86, American politician, member of the New Jersey Senate (1966–1968), Bergen County Freeholder (1975–1980).
- Garland Shifflett, 85, American baseball player (Washington Senators, Minnesota Twins).
- Patrick Simon, 64, French politician, Mayor of Villers-Bretonneux (since 2008), advocate of Australia–France relations, COVID-19.
- Andy Thompson, 57, American politician, member of the Ohio House of Representatives (2011–2018).
- Yoshio, 70, Mexican singer, COVID-19.
- Daren Zenner, 48, Canadian-American boxer.

=== 14 ===
- Anisuzzaman, 83, Bangladeshi academic, COVID-19.
- Tessie Aquino-Oreta, 75, Filipino politician, MP (1987–2004).
- Berith Bohm, 87, Swedish operatic soprano.
- Bertram S. Brown, 89, American psychiatrist, director of the National Institute of Mental Health (1970–1977), cardiovascular disease.
- Guido Cerniglia, 81, Italian actor (The Scientific Cardplayer, Alla mia cara mamma nel giorno del suo compleanno, Il giustiziere di mezzogiorno).
- Judith Clarke, 76, Australian author.
- Hans Cohen, 97, Dutch microbiologist, COVID-19.
- Tony Coll, 70, New Zealand rugby league player (West Coast, national team), heart attack.
- Dalila Ennadre, 53, Moroccan film director (J'ai tant aimé...).
- Ingvar Ericsson, 92, Swedish Olympic runner (1952, 1956).
- Phyllis George, 70, American sportscaster (The NFL Today), First Lady of Kentucky (1979–1983), and beauty queen (Miss America 1971), polycythemia vera.
- Joey Giambra, 86, American jazz musician, playwright and actor, COVID-19.
- Henryk Jaskuła, 96, Polish yachtsman.
- Albert Krieger, 96, American defense lawyer.
- Attila Ladinszky, 70, Hungarian footballer (Tatabánya, Feyenoord, Anderlecht), heart attack.
- Ray Land, 89, Australian Olympic sprinter (1956).
- Ronald Ludington, 85, American figure skater, Olympic bronze medalist (1960).
- Khalid Mahmud, 94, Pakistani Islamic scholar and writer, complications from a broken hip.
- Bhabani Charan Pattanayak, 98, Indian politician, MP (1961–1972, 1978–1984).
- Pepper Rodgers, 88, American football player and coach (Kansas Jayhawks, UCLA Bruins, Georgia Tech Yellow Jackets), complications from a fall.
- Sally Rowley, 88, American jeweler and civil rights activist, COVID-19.
- Debesh Roy, 83, Indian writer, cardiac arrest.
- Jorge Santana, 68, Mexican guitarist (Malo).
- Ronald J. Shurer, 41, American army medic, recipient of Medal of Honor, complications from lung cancer.
- William W. Snavely, 100, American Air Force lieutenant general.
- Michel Souplet, 91, French politician, Senator (1983–2001).
- Czesław Stanula, 80, Polish-born Brazilian Roman Catholic prelate, Bishop of Floresta (1989–1997) and Itabuna (1997–2017).
- Jim Tucker, 87, American basketball player (Syracuse Nationals, Harlem Globetrotters), complications from Alzheimer's disease.
- Bob Watson, 74, American baseball player (Houston Astros, New York Yankees, Atlanta Braves) and executive (New York Yankees), kidney disease.
- Larry W. Womble, 78, American politician, member of the North Carolina House of Representatives (1994–2012).

=== 15 ===
- José Rodrigo Aréchiga Gamboa, 39, Mexican cartel leader, shot.
- Gurdas Singh Badal, 88, Indian politician, MP (1971–1977).
- Frank Bielec, 72, American interior designer (Trading Spaces, While You Were Out), heart attack.
- Herbert Blendinger, 84, Austrian composer and violist.
- Claes Borgström, 75, Swedish lawyer and politician, Equality Ombudsman (2000–2007), COVID-19.
- Ezio Bosso, 48, Italian composer (I'm Not Scared), pianist and conductor, neurodegenerative illness.
- Bob Cline, 87, American politician, member of the California State Assembly (1971–1981).
- Denny DeMarchi, 57, Canadian multi-instrumentalist (Alias, Killer Bee, The Cranberries), cancer.
- Sergio Denis, 71, Argentine singer, songwriter and actor, complications from a fall.
- Paddy Fenning, 69, Irish Gaelic footballer (Tullamore, Offaly), amyotrophic lateral sclerosis.
- Juan Genovés, 89, Spanish painter and graphic artist.
- Ernie Gonzalez, 59, American golfer, complications from Alzheimer's disease.
- Bruno Graf, 66, Swiss footballer (FC Basel), cancer.
- Mitch Greenlick, 85, American politician, member of the Oregon House of Representatives (since 2003).
- Shri Krishna Joshi, 84, Indian physicist.
- Frederick Kantor, 77, American physicist and inventor.
- Allen Lee, 80, Hong Kong industrialist and politician, member of the Legislative Council (1978–1998) and Chairman of the Liberal Party (1993–1998).
- Kurt Liederer, 92, Austrian Olympic diver.
- Sergio Marchant, 58, Chilean football player (Arturo Fernández Vial, Antofagasta, national team) and manager.
- Phil May, 75, English singer (The Pretty Things), complications following hip surgery.
- Paul McCurrie, 91, American politician, New Jersey assemblyman (1962–1964), COVID-19.
- Rick Muru, 69, New Zealand rugby league player (Waikato, national team).
- Franco Nenci, 85, Italian boxer, Olympic silver medallist (1956).
- Tom O'Donoghue, 79, Irish hurler.
- John Palmer, 77, Canadian theatre and film director.
- Sandro Petrone, 66, Italian journalist, lung cancer.
- Henrik Pontén, 54, Swedish jurist, complications from a traffic collision.
- Muthappa Rai, 68, Indian restaurateur, brain cancer.
- Mary Remnant, 85, English musician and medievalist.
- Francisco Sanz, Spanish Olympic sport shooter.
- Olga Savary, 86, Brazilian writer and poet.
- Ralph Sorenson, 93, Canadian politician, cancer.
- Steve Spray, 79, American golfer.
- Monk Tate, 86, American racing driver.
- Henri Vergon, 51, Belgian-born art dealer, heart attack.
- Fred Willard, 86, American actor (Best in Show, Fernwood 2 Night, Modern Family) and comedian, heart attack.
- Ye Yonglie, 79, Chinese writer.

=== 16 ===
- Julio Anguita, 78, Spanish politician, Secretary General of the Communist Party (1988–1998), mayor of Córdoba (1979–1986) and coordinator of United Left (1989–2000), heart attack.
- Larry Aubry, 86, American columnist and activist.
- Rodger Bird, 76, American football player (Oakland Raiders, Kentucky Wildcats).
- Gerard Brady, 83, Irish politician, Minister for Education (1982) and TD (1977–1992).
- Émile Chaline, 98, French admiral and resistance fighter.
- Chung Chao-cheng, 95, Taiwanese writer.
- Mário Chermont, 83, Brazilian politician, COVID-19.
- Gene Cockrell, 85, American football player (New York Titans, Saskatchewan Roughriders).
- Robert T. Coles, 90, American architect.
- Laurie Craker, 67, English football player (Watford, Hayes) and manager (Flackwell Heath), cancer.
- Jacques Crevoisier, 72, French football coach, cardiac arrest.
- Cliff Eyland, 65, Canadian painter and writer.
- Frances Goldin, 95, American housing rights activist and literary agent.
- Eusebio Grados, 66, Peruvian huayno singer, cardiac arrest.
- Mizban Khadr al-Hadi, 81, Iraqi military officer, member of the Revolutionary Command Council (1991–2001).
- Him Chhem, 82, Cambodian politician, MP (since 2003).
- Wilson Roosevelt Jerman, 91, American White House butler and staffer (1957–2012), COVID-19.
- Hossein Kazempour Ardebili, 67, Iranian politician, Minister of Commerce (1980–1981) and representative to OPEC (1995–2008, since 2013), brain haemorrhage.
- James Gordon Kelly, 90, American psychologist.
- Raine Loo, 75, Estonian actress (Georg).
- Michael McCaskey, 76, American sports executive, president of the Chicago Bears (1983–1999), leukemia.
- Monique Mercure, 89, Canadian actress (Naked Lunch, The Red Violin, J.A. Martin Photographer), cancer.
- René Moreu, 99, French painter and illustrator.
- A. T. Pathrose, 88, Indian politician, Kerala MLA (1965).
- Pilar Pellicer, 82, Mexican actress (The Life of Agustín Lara, Day of the Evil Gun, La Choca), COVID-19.
- Constantin Radu, 75, Romanian footballer (Argeș Pitești).
- Azad Rahman, 76, Bangladeshi composer.
- Gene Rossides, 92, American politician and football player (Columbia Lions).
- Lynn Shelton, 54, American film and television director (Humpday, Your Sister's Sister, Fresh Off the Boat), blood disorder.
- Chuck Sieminski, 79, American football player (San Francisco 49ers, Atlanta Falcons).
- Arthur Summons, 84, Australian rugby football player (Western Suburbs, national rugby league and rugby union team), namesake of the Provan-Summons Trophy.
- László Szabó, 85, Hungarian Grand Prix motorcycle road racer.
- Donn Trenner, 93, American jazz pianist.
- K. Varadarajan, 73, Indian politician.
- Jon Whiteley, 75, Scottish child actor (The Kidnappers, The Spanish Gardener) and historian.
- Tony Yates, 82, American college basketball player and coach (Cincinnati Bearcats).
- Donald Yeagley, 100, American politician, member of the Indiana House of Representatives (1959–1963) and Senate (1963–1965).

=== 17 ===
- Wilson Braga, 88, Brazilian politician, Paraíba MLA (1955–1967, 2011–2015), Deputy (1967–1982, 1995–2003, 2007–2011) and Governor of Paraíba (1983–1987), COVID-19.
- José Cutileiro, 85, Portuguese diplomat and writer, Secretary General of the Western European Union (1994–1999).
- Du Wei, 57, Chinese diplomat, ambassador to Ukraine (2016–2020) and Israel (since 2020).
- Vormsi Enn, 76, Estonian esotericist.
- Hermann Fellner, 69, German politician, MP (1980–1990), heart attack.
- Colin Franklin, 96, English writer and bibliographer.
- Shad Gaspard, 39, American professional wrestler (WWE) and actor (Get Hard, From Dusk till Dawn: The Series), drowning.
- Hans-Joachim Gelberg, 89, German writer and publisher.
- Ernest W. Gibson III, 92, American politician and jurist, Vermont state representative (1961–1963) and Justice of the Vermont Supreme Court (1983–1997).
- Aleksandra Kornhauser Frazer, 93, Slovenian chemist.
- Tatjana Lematschko, 72, Russian chess player.
- Ratnakar Matkari, 81, Indian writer and film producer, COVID-19.
- Mercedes Mendoza Suasti, 93, Ecuadorian pasillo singer.
- Lucky Peterson, 55, American blues singer, keyboardist and guitarist.
- Ken Retzer, 86, American baseball player (Washington Senators).
- William K. Scarborough, 87, American historian.
- Odessa Shannon, 91, American human rights activist and politician.
- George Brian Sinclair, 91, British army officer.
- Peter Thomas, 94, German composer.
- Sean Tyla, 73, English rock musician (Ducks Deluxe) and singer-songwriter.
- William Whitehall, 85, American politician, member of the Missouri House of Representatives (1983–1987).
- Yuri Zisser, 59, Belarusian web services executive, founder and owner of Tut.By.

=== 18 ===
- Allan Acosta, 95, American engineer.
- Minkailu Bah, Sierra Leonean politician.
- Massimo Berta, 71, Italian footballer (Alessandria, Sambenedettese, Reggio Audace).
- Karen Blumenthal, 61, American business journalist and author, heart attack.
- Philip Bromberg, 89, American psychoanalyst.
- Antonio Colomban, 88, Italian football player and manager (Messina), heart attack.
- Mujibur Rahman Devdas, 90, Bangladeshi political activist and mathematician.
- Marko Elsner, 60, Slovenian footballer (Red Star Belgrade, Nice, Yugoslavia national team).
- Ronald T. Farrar, 84, American journalist and academic.
- Jesse Freitas Sr., 99, American football player (San Francisco 49ers, Chicago Rockets, Buffalo Bills), cancer.
- Cornel Georgescu, 64, Romanian football player and coach.
- Rae Johnson, 67, Canadian painter, amyotrophic lateral sclerosis.
- Saleh Abdullah Kamel, 79, Saudi Arabian conglomerate and banking executive, founder of Dallah Al-Baraka.
- Leonard Levitt, 79, American crime reporter, lung cancer.
- Vincent Malone, 88, English Roman Catholic prelate, Auxiliary Bishop of Liverpool (1989–2006), COVID-19.
- Bill Olner, 78, British politician, MP (1992–2010), COVID-19.
- Ken Osmond, 76, American actor (Leave It to Beaver, The New Leave It to Beaver) and police officer (Los Angeles Police Department), complications from COPD.
- Neil Rabens, 90, American board game designer, co-creator of Twister.
- Raymond Ravenscroft, 88, English archdeacon.
- Michelle Rossignol, 80, Canadian actress (Once Upon a Time in the East, Beyond Forty, You).
- Susan Rothenberg, 75, American painter.
- James Sherwood, 86, American-born British shipping executive.
- Raman Pratap Singh, 69, Fijian politician, president of the National Federation Party (2005–2014).
- Craig Welch, 71, Canadian animator (No Problem, How Wings Are Attached to the Backs of Angels), COVID-19.
- Fred Wendt, 95, American football player (UTEP Miners).
- Ben Williams, 65, American football player (Buffalo Bills, Ole Miss Rebels).
- Willie K, 59, American singer and ukulele player, lung cancer.

=== 19 ===
- Richard Anuszkiewicz, 89, American artist.
- Ken Burmeister, 72, American college basketball coach (Loyola Ramblers, UTSA Roadrunners, Incarnate Word Cardinals), cancer.
- Peter Day, 81, British chemist.
- Annie Glenn, 100, American disability rights activist and philanthropist, complications from COVID-19.
- Chuck Graham, 55, American politician, member of the Missouri Senate (2005–2009) and House of Representatives (1997–2005), heart attack.
- Pembroke J. Herring, 90, American film editor (Tora! Tora! Tora!, Bound for Glory, Out of Africa).
- Carlos Jirón, 65, Nicaraguan politician, member of the National Assembly, complications from diabetes.
- Peter Kiilu, Kenyan politician, MP (2007–2013).
- Arvid Torgeir Lie, 81, Norwegian writer and poet.
- Charley Lippincott, 80, American film marketing publicist, complications from a heart attack.
- Stacey Milbern, 33, American disability rights activist, complications following surgery.
- Ken Nightingall, 92, British film sound engineer (For Your Eyes Only, A View to a Kill, Octopussy), COVID-19.
- Saeed Ahmad Palanpuri, 78, Indian Islamic scholar.
- Mary-Anne Plaatjies van Huffel, 60, South African pastor and academic, complications from surgery.
- Salah Stétié, 90, Lebanese writer and poet.
- Norman G. Thomas, 90, American astronomer, complications from Alzheimer's disease.
- John W. Turnbull, 84, Canadian politician.
- Gil Vianna, 54, Brazilian politician, complications from COVID-19.
- Ravi Zacharias, 74, Indian-born Canadian-American Christian apologist, spine cancer.

=== 20 ===
- Syed Fazal Agha, 78, Pakistani politician, Governor of Balochistan (1999), COVID-19.
- Emma Amos, 83, American painter and printmaker, complications from Alzheimer's disease.
- Joe Beauchamp, 76, American football player (San Diego Chargers).
- William R. Bryant Jr., 82, American politician, member of the Michigan House of Representatives (1971–1996), Parkinson's disease.
- Anthony DiGiorgio, 79, American academic administrator, president of Winthrop University (1989–2013), pulmonary embolism.
- Stephen A. DiMauro, 87, American jockey, horse breeder and trainer (Lady Pitt, Dearly Precious, Wajima), cancer.
- Denis Farkasfalvy, 83, Hungarian-American Roman Catholic priest and theologian, COVID-19.
- Ronald Giere, 82, American philosopher.
- Malin Gjörup, 56, Swedish actress (Hello Baby) and operatic mezzo-soprano, cerebral haemorrhage.
- Wolfgang Gunkel, 72, German rower, Olympic champion (1972).
- Juan Justo Amaro, 89, Uruguayan politician, Senator (2005–2010) and Deputy (1971–1973, 1985–1994).
- William J. Keating, 93, American law firm executive and politician, member of the U.S. House of Representatives (1971–1974).
- Jeffrey King, 79, Canadian politician.
- Wilbur MacDonald, 86, Canadian politician, MP (1979–1980).
- Karl-Göran Mäler, 81, Swedish environmental economist.
- Matthew J. Matthews, 66, American diplomat, ambassador to Brunei (since 2019).
- Margaret Maughan, 91, British archer, swimmer and lawn bowler, Paralympic champion (1960, 1972).
- Adolfo Nicolás, 84, Spanish Roman Catholic priest, Superior General of the Society of Jesus (2008–2016).
- Howard C. Nielson, 95, American politician, member of the U.S. House of Representatives (1983–1991), Utah House of Representatives (1967–1975) and Senate (1997–2000).
- Héctor Ochoa, 77, Argentine Olympic footballer (1964).
- Shaheen Raza, 60, Pakistani politician, Punjab MPA (since 2018), COVID-19.
- George T. Ross, 70, American politician, member of the Massachusetts House of Representatives (2011–2013).
- Gemma Salem, 76, Turkish-born Swiss writer.
- Dan Simkovitch, 66, French actress (Les Mystères de l'amour, L'Opération Corned-Beef).
- Trevor Stewart, 80, Australian cricketer (Queensland).
- Gianfranco Terenzi, 79, Sammarinese politician, Captain Regent (1987–1988, 2000–2001, 2006, 2014–2015), traffic collision.
- Hector Thompson, 70, Australian Hall of Fame boxer.
- Surapong Tovichakchaikul, 67, Thai politician, Deputy Prime Minister (2012–2014) and Minister of Foreign Affairs (2011–2014), liver cancer.
- Rakesh Verma, 59, Indian politician, Himachal Pradesh MLA, cardiac arrest.
- Wan Weixing, 62, Chinese space physicist, member of the Chinese Academy of Sciences.

=== 21 ===
- Naomi Brooks, 86, American educator and civil rights activist.
- Juan Curbelo, 74, Cuban Olympic weightlifter.
- Bobby Digital, 59, Jamaican reggae and dancehall producer.
- Mamoon al-Farkh, 62, Syrian actor (Bab Al-Hara), heart attack.
- Alexander Gerasimov, 61, Russian ice hockey player, Olympic champion (1984).
- Neil Howlett, 85, English operatic baritone.
- Lluís Juste de Nin, 75, Spanish cartoonist and fashion designer (Armand Basi), cancer.
- Markus Klaer, 51, German engineer and politician, member of the Abgeordnetenhaus of Berlin (2011–2016, since 2019).
- Arnulf Kolstad, 78, Norwegian social psychologist.
- Sergey Kramarenko, 97, Russian Air Force officer, Hero of the Soviet Union.
- Lew Byong-hion, 95, South Korean military officer and diplomat, Ambassador to the United States (1982–1985).
- Lawrence Lindemer, 98, American politician and jurist, Michigan state representative (1951–1952) and Justice of the Michigan Supreme Court (1975–1977.
- Maamaloa Lolohea, 51, Tongan Olympic weightlifter (2008).
- Alan Merten, 78, American academic administrator, president of George Mason University (1996–2012), complications from Parkinson's disease.
- Shirley McKague, 84, American politician, member of the Idaho House of Representatives (1996–2007) and Senate (2007–2012).
- Freddy Michalski, 73, French translator.
- Roberto Moya, 55, Cuban athlete, Olympic bronze medallist (1992).
- Julitta Münch, 60, German television presenter (WDR).
- John Murphy, 72, Irish Gaelic football player and manager.
- Merlin Nunn, 89, Canadian judge, chief justice of the Nova Scotia Supreme Court (1982–2005).
- Jörg Ohm, 76, German footballer (1. FC Magdeburg, FC Sachsen Leipzig).
- David Pawson, 90, English evangelical minister.
- Kamrun Nahar Putul, Bangladeshi politician, COVID-19.
- Gerd Strack, 64, German footballer (1. FC Köln, FC Basel, national team), heart attack.
- Oliver E. Williamson, 87, American economist, Nobel Prize laureate (2009), complications from pneumonia.
- Douglas Tyndall Wright, 92, Canadian engineer and academic administrator, President of the University of Waterloo (1981–1993).
- John Zdechlik, 83, American composer.

=== 22 ===
- Zara Abid, 28, Pakistani model and actress (Chaudhry – The Martyr), plane crash.
- Antonio Bonet Correa, 94, Spanish art historian.
- André Cartier, 74, Canadian actor (Bound for Glory, Passe-Partout).
- Heather Chasen, 92, British actress (Cat Run, Les Misérables).
- Peter Harold Cole, 83, Australian electronic engineer.
- Ashley Cooper, 83, Australian tennis player, four-time Grand Slam tournament singles champion, Australian Open (1957, 1958), US Open (1958), Wimbledon (1958).
- Denise Cronenberg, 81, Canadian costume designer (The Fly, A History of Violence, Crash).
- Robb Forman Dew, 73, American writer, complications from endocarditis.
- Nancy Harrington, 94, American politician, member of the Florida House of Representatives (1974–1976).
- Adam Henein, 91, Egyptian sculptor.
- José Jacinto Hidalgo, 77, Venezuelan Olympic sprinter (1968).
- Francine Holley, 100, Belgian-born French painter.
- Mory Kanté, 70, Guinean singer and kora player ("Yé ké yé ké").
- Jack Klotz, 87, American football player (New York Titans, San Diego Chargers, New York Jets, Houston Oilers).
- William Lyon, 97, American major general.
- Anatoliy Matviyenko, 67, Ukrainian politician, Governor of Vinnytsia Oblast (1996–1998) and Deputy (1990–1994, 1998–2012, 2014–2019).
- Albert Memmi, 99, Tunisian-born French writer and essayist.
- Miljan Mrdaković, 38, Serbian footballer (Metalist Kharkiv, OFK Beograd, Maccabi Tel Aviv), suicide.
- Cristina Pezzoli, 56, Italian theatre director.
- Hecky Powell, 72, American businessman, philanthropist and community leader, COVID-19.
- Saturn, 83–84, American-born alligator (Berlin Zoological Garden, Battle of Berlin, Moscow Zoo).
- Peter Schiller, 62, German Olympic ice hockey player (1988), heart failure.
- Luigi Simoni, 81, Italian football player (Brescia) and manager (Napoli, Inter Milan), complications from a stroke.
- Naipal Singh, 79, Indian politician, MP (2014–2019), cardiac arrest.
- Jerry Sloan, 78, American basketball player (Chicago Bulls) and Hall of Fame coach (Utah Jazz), complications from Parkinson's disease and Lewy body dementia.
- Dave Smith, 73, American football player (Pittsburgh Steelers, Houston Oilers, Kansas City Chiefs).
- Richard Timberlake, 97, American economist.

=== 23 ===
- Alberto Alesina, 63, Italian political economist, heart attack.
- Richard Byerly, 81, American politician, member of the Iowa House of Representatives (1973–1983).
- Maria Velho da Costa, 81, Portuguese writer (New Portuguese Letters).
- Kåre Dæhlen, 93, Norwegian diplomat.
- Valeriy Davydenko, 47, Ukrainian politician, Deputy (since 2014), shot.
- David Donnell, 81, Canadian poet and writer.
- John Eden, Baron Eden of Winton, 94, British politician, member of the House of Lords (1983–2015), MP (1954–1983).
- Jennie Erdal, 69, Scottish novelist, melanoma.
- Hana Kimura, 22, Japanese professional wrestler (Stardom, Wrestle-1) and reality TV personality (Terrace House: Tokyo 2019–2020), suicide by hydrogen sulfide poisoning.
- Fabrice Lepaul, 43, French footballer (Auxerre, Saint-Étienne, Colmar), traffic collision.
- Robert F. Mager, 96, American psychologist and author.
- Jitendra Nath Pande, 79, Indian physician, COVID-19.
- Brian Sharoff, 77, American politician and manufacturing executive, member of the New York State Assembly (1971–1976).
- Eddie Sutton, 84, American Hall of Fame college basketball coach (Arkansas Razorbacks, Kentucky Wildcats, Oklahoma State Cowboys).
- Johann Weber, 93, Austrian Roman Catholic prelate, Bishop of Graz-Seckau (1969–2001).
- Bryan Wharton, 86, British photographer.
- Edward A. Wilkinson, 86, American rear admiral.

=== 24 ===
- Tom Arie, 86, Czech-born British psychiatrist.
- Joe Bertram, 63, American politician.
- Mukar Cholponbayev, 70, Kyrgyz politician, speaker of the Supreme Council (1995–1996), COVID-19.
- Jimmy Cobb, 91, American jazz drummer (Miles Davis Quintet), lung cancer.
- Jean-Loup Dabadie, 81, French journalist and screenwriter (Such a Gorgeous Kid Like Me, Courage fuyons, Clara et les Chics Types).
- Warren DeBoer, 74, American anthropologist, esophageal cancer.
- Arthur Dehaine, 87, French politician, Deputy (1976–1981, 1986–2002), mayor of Senlis (1974–2008).
- Carlo Durante, 73, Italian marathon runner, Paralympic champion (1992), heart attack.
- José Figueroa, 60, Honduran footballer (Real Murcia, Hércules, national team).
- Michael Hall, 93, American actor (The Best Years of Our Lives, The Last Musketeer, Blood of Dracula) and art collector.
- Mockbul Hossain, 70, Bangladeshi teaching hospital executive and politician, MP (1996–2001), COVID-19.
- Jerry F. Hough, 85, American political scientist.
- Robert K. Jaedicke, 91, American academic, Dean of the Stanford Graduate School of Business (1983–1990).
- Hussain Ahmad Kanjo, Pakistani politician, Minister of Science and Technology (2002–2007), COVID-19.
- Ron Landry, 76, American politician, member of the Louisiana State Senate (1976–2000).
- Lily Lian, 103, French singer.
- John B. Little, 90, American radiobiologist.
- John Loengard, 85, American photographer.
- Vincent Migliore, 69, American politician, member of the New Hampshire House of Representatives (2017–2020).
- Lucia Mee, 20, Northern Irish organ donation campaigner, liver failure.
- Biff Pocoroba, 66, American baseball player (Atlanta Braves).
- Bruce Reid, 84, Australian politician, member of the House of Representatives (1990–1998).
- Al Rex, 91, American bassist (Bill Haley & His Comets).
- William J. Small, 93, American journalist, President of NBC News (1979–1982).
- Zdena Tominová, 79, Czech novelist and political dissident.
- Marshall Tymn, 82, American editor and academic, pneumonia.
- Dinaldo Wanderley, 69, Brazilian politician and economist, COVID-19.

=== 25 ===
- Bucky Baxter, 65, American guitarist (Bob Dylan, Steve Earle, Ryan Adams).
- Joseph Bouasse, 21, Cameroonian footballer (Roma, Vicenza, Universitatea Cluj), heart attack.
- Nadejda Brânzan, 71, Moldovan politician, MP (1990–1994).
- Marcelino Campanal, 88, Spanish footballer (Sevilla, Deportivo de La Coruña, national team).
- Otto de la Rocha, 86, Nicaraguan singer, songwriter and actor.
- Francis Dufour, 91, Canadian politician, Quebec MNA (1985–1996).
- Chris Dufresne, 62, American sports writer.
- Louise Feltham, 85, Canadian politician, cancer.
- George Floyd, 46, American police detainee, asphyxia.
- Ismail Gamadiid, Somali politician, Minister of Agriculture, the Environment, and Climate Change of Puntland, COVID-19. (death announced on this date)
- Arnold Hendrick, 69, American game designer (Darklands), cancer.
- John Howley, 88, Australian painter.
- Hyun Soong-jong, 101, South Korean politician, Prime Minister (1992–1993).
- Jimmy Kirunda, 70, Ugandan football player (Express, KCC, national team) and manager, heart attack.
- Renate Krößner, 75, German actress (Solo Sunny, Alles auf Zucker!).
- Marv Luster, 82, American Hall of Fame CFL football player (Montreal Alouettes, Toronto Argonauts), COVID-19.
- Bob Lynn, 87, American politician, member of the Alaska House of Representatives (2003–2017).
- Paolo Mietto, 85, Italian-born Ecuadorian Roman Catholic prelate, Apostolic Vicar of Napo (1996–2010).
- Joel Revzen, 74, American opera conductor, COVID-19.
- Balbir Singh Sr., 96, Indian field hockey player and manager, Olympic champion (1948, 1952, 1956) and World Cup winner (1975), complications from bronchopneumonia.
- John Peter Sloan, 51, English comedian, theatre actor and writer, respiratory failure.
- Vadão, 63, Brazilian football manager (Corinthians, women's national team), liver cancer.
- Henri van Zanten, 63, Dutch artist.
- Mary J. Wilson, 83, American zookeeper, COVID-19.
- Wu Pong-fong, 55, Taiwanese actor and choreographer, Golden Bell winner (2008, 2019), stroke.

=== 26 ===
- Peter Alexander, 81, American sculptor (Light and Space).
- Miguel Artola Gallego, 96, Spanish historian, Prince of Asturias Award (1991).
- Michael Athans, 83, Greek-born American control theorist and professor.
- William Bodde Jr., 88, American diplomat.
- Oscar Lino Lopes Fernandes Braga, 88, Angolan Roman Catholic prelate, Bishop of Benguela (1975–2008).
- Sir John Brigstocke, 74, British admiral, Second Sea Lord (1997–2000).
- Johanna Ehrnrooth, 61, Finnish painter.
- Moysey Fishbein, 73, Ukrainian poet and translator.
- Samvel Gasparov, 81, Russian film director (Hatred, The Sixth, Coordinates of Death) and short story writer, COVID-19.
- Mauricio Hanuch, 43, Argentine footballer (Platense, Independiente, Olimpo), stomach cancer.
- Jon Hellevig, 58, Finnish lawyer and businessman.
- Richard Herd, 87, American actor (T. J. Hooker, All the President's Men, The China Syndrome), complications from cancer.
- Irm Hermann, 77, German actress (Katzelmacher, The Merchant of Four Seasons, The Bitter Tears of Petra von Kant).
- Floyd Hillman, 86, Canadian ice hockey player (Boston Bruins).
- Stanley Ho, 98, Hong Kong-Macanese gambling executive and philanthropist, founder of Sociedade de Turismo e Diversões de Macau, kidney failure.
- Oleh Hornykiewicz, 93, Austrian biochemist, Wolf Prize winner (1979).
- Houdini, 21, Canadian rapper, shot.
- Anthony James, 77, American actor (In the Heat of the Night, High Plains Drifter, Gunsmoke), cancer.
- Prahlad Jani, 90, Indian breatharian monk.
- İsmail Hakkı Karadayı, 88, Turkish military officer, Chief of the General Staff (1994–1998), multiple organ failure.
- Geoff Kerr, 95, Australian VFL footballer.
- Vladimir Lopukhin, 68, Russian politician, Minister of Energy (1991–1992), COVID-19.
- Christian Mbulu, 23, English footballer (Brentwood Town, Motherwell, Morecambe).
- Glyn Pardoe, 73, English footballer (Manchester City).
- Cliff Pennington, 80, Canadian ice hockey player (1960).
- Ijaz Qaiser, 68, Pakistani singer.
- Tony Scannell, 74, Irish actor (Flash Gordon, The Bill).
- Bonno Thoden van Velzen, 87, Dutch anthropologist.
- Arumugam Thondaman, 55, Sri Lankan politician, MP (since 1994), heart attack.
- Claire Nicolas White, 94, Dutch-born American poet and author.
- Jonathan Whitehead, 59, English musician and composer.
- Katie Wolf, 94, American politician, member of the Indiana House of Representatives (1984–1986) and Senate (1986–2000).

=== 27 ===
- Tony Brown, 83, English cricketer (Gloucestershire).
- Murilo Melo Filho, 91, Brazilian writer, lawyer and journalist, multiple organ failure.
- Wally Gacek, 92, Canadian ice hockey player (Michigan Wolverines).
- Bruno Galliker, 88, Swiss Olympic hurdler (1960).
- Federico García Vigil, 79, Uruguayan composer and conductor.
- Herbert Gross, 91, American mathematician.
- Robert Hite, 63, American artist.
- Jack Hunt, 97, American politician, member of the North Carolina House of Representatives (1973–1995).
- Mujtaba Hussain, 83, Indian Urdu author and satirist.
- Sam Johnson, 89, American politician, member of the U.S. (1991–2019) and Texas (1985–1991) Houses of Representatives.
- Regis Korchinski-Paquet, 29, Canadian domestic violence victim, fall.
- Larry Kramer, 84, American playwright (The Normal Heart) and LGBT rights activist, pneumonia.
- Earl McCune, 63, American electrical engineer.
- Mark McInnes, 56, Australian rugby union player (national team)
- Liesbeth Migchelsen, 49, Dutch footballer (Heike Rheine, AZ Alkmaar, national team), cancer.
- Aldo Nardin, 72, Italian footballer (Arezzo, Ternana, Lecce).
- Evelyn Nicol, 89, American immunologist and microbiologist, complications from COVID-19.
- Peri Vaevae Pare, Cook Islands politician, MP (1999–2006).
- Hugh Parmer, 80, American politician, member of the Texas House of Representatives (1963–1965) and Senate (1983–1991), mayor of Fort Worth (1977–1979).
- Ron Pinkney, 85, American broadcaster.
- Peggy Pope, 91, American actress (9 to 5, Calucci's Department, The Last Starfighter).
- Nicholas Rinaldi, 86, American poet and author (The Jukebox Queen of Malta, Between Two Rivers), pneumonia from COVID-19.
- Glenn Roush, 86, American politician, member of the Montana House of Representatives (1981–1984) and Senate (1999–2011).
- Peter V. Sampo, 89, American educator and academic.
- Arthur L. Thurlow, 107, Canadian politician and judge, Nova Scotia MLA (1949–1953).
- Billie Lee Turner, 95, American botanist, COVID-19.
- Dario Vidošević, 52, Croatian Olympic rower (1984).
- Vegard Vigerust, 94, Norwegian author.
- Ubaidur Rahman Zia, Pakistani Islamic scholar.

=== 28 ===
- Gracia Barrios, 92, Chilean painter.
- Guy Bedos, 85, French actor (Sweet and Sour, Pardon Mon Affaire, Too!, All Together) and comedian, complications from Alzheimer's disease.
- Jock Blair, Australian television writer and producer (Homicide, The Sullivans, Paradise Beach). (death announced on this date)
- Brendan Bowyer, 81, Irish singer ("The Hucklebuck").
- David Owen Brooks, 65, American serial killer, COVID-19.
- Jim Brown, 93, Australian politician, Western Australian MLA (1971–1974) and MLC (1980–1992).
- F. Enzio Busche, 90, German LDS Church general authority.
- Gustaaf De Smet, 85, Belgian Olympic cyclist (1956).
- Mary D'Imperio, 90, American cryptographer.
- Celine Fariala Mangaza, 52, Congolese disability advocate, COVID-19.
- Claude Goasguen, 75, French politician, Deputy (since 2012), COVID-19.
- Gustavo Guillén, 57, Argentine actor (Chiquititas) and drummer, complications from prostate surgery.
- Claude Heater, 92, American opera singer.
- Vernon Kerr, 92, American politician, member of the New Mexico House of Representatives (1971–1986).
- Bob Kulick, 70, American guitarist (W.A.S.P., Lou Reed) and record producer (Kiss).
- M. P. Veerendra Kumar, 83, Indian journalist and politician, MP (1996–1998, 2004–2009, 2016–2017, since 2018), cardiac arrest.
- Robert M. Laughlin, 85, American anthropologist and linguist (Tzotzil language), COVID-19.
- Aleksandr Mastyanin, 67, Russian Olympic sport shooter.
- Charlie Monttana, 58, Mexican rock urbano singer, heart attack.
- Lennie Niehaus, 90, American saxophonist and film composer (Unforgiven, The Bridges of Madison County, Space Cowboys).
- Wolfram Paulus, 62, Austrian film director (Heidenlöcher) and screenwriter, cancer.
- Suzanne Roquette, 77, German actress.
- Reed Scowen, 88, Canadian politician.
- Paul Shrubb, 64, English football player (Brentford, Aldershot, Aldershot Town), manager and scout, motor neurone disease.
- Peter Slater, 87, Australian ornithologist.
- Jaroslav Švach, 47, Czech footballer (Zlín), stroke.
- Ron Withem, 73, American politician, member of the Nebraska Legislature (1983–1997).

=== 29 ===
- Wayne P. Anderson, 90, American psychologist.
- Maikanti Baru, 60, Nigerian crude oil marketer, group managing director of Nigerian National Petroleum Corporation (2016–2019).
- Henri Baudouin, 93, French politician, Deputy (1962–1986) and mayor of Granville (1961–1977, 1983–1989).
- John Bermingham, 96, American politician, member of the Colorado Senate (1965–1973).
- Henry Brault, 92, French Olympic runner (1952).
- Christopher Brocklebank-Fowler, 86, British politician, MP (1970–1983).
- Delores Brumfield, 88, American baseball player (South Bend Blue Sox, Kenosha Comets, Fort Wayne Daisies).
- Walter Cahn, 86, German-born American medievalist and art historian.
- Curtis Cokes, 82, American Hall of Fame boxer, WBA/WBC world welterweight champion (1966–1969), heart failure.
- Bejan Daruwalla, 88, Indian astrology columnist, pneumonia.
- Gilberto Dimenstein, 63, Brazilian journalist (Folha de S.Paulo), pancreatic cancer.
- Robert Eramouspé, 84, French rugby league player (national team).
- Evaldo Gouveia, 91, Brazilian singer and songwriter, COVID-19.
- Eva Hodgson, 95, Bermudian activist and writer.
- Ajit Jogi, 74, Indian politician, MP (1986–1999, 2004–2008), Chief Minister of Chhattisgarh (2000–2003) and Chhattisgarh MLA (2001–2013, since 2018), cardiac arrest.
- Ron Johnston, 79, British geographer, heart attack.
- Alfred Kolleritsch, 89, Austrian writer, poet and philosopher.
- Jeanie Lambe, 79, Scottish jazz singer.
- John Leedham, 92, Australian footballer.
- Leslie R. Lemon, 73, American meteorologist.
- Sidney Locks, 71, American politician, member of the North Carolina House of Representatives (1982–1990).
- Hank Mason, 88, American baseball player (Philadelphia Phillies).
- Jerzy Pilch, 67, Polish journalist and writer, complications from Parkinson's disease.
- Shahine Robinson, 66, Jamaican politician, MP (since 2001), lung cancer.
- Eric Schreurs, 61, Dutch cartoonist, heart failure.
- Bhanwar Lal Sharma, 95, Indian politician, member of the Rajasthan Legislative Assembly (1977–2003).
- Louis P. Sheldon, 85, American Anglican priest.
- Susie Simcock, 81, New Zealand sports administrator, president of the World Squash Federation (1996–2002).
- Hank Stackpole, 85, American military officer.
- Henk Steevens, 88, Dutch racing cyclist (1953 Tour de France), cancer.
- Randy Staten, 76, American football player (New York Giants) and politician, member of the Minnesota House of Representatives (1981–1987).
- James Stevenson, 91, Northern Irish rugby union player, COVID-19.
- Célio Taveira, 79, Brazilian footballer (Vasco da Gama, Nacional, national team), COVID-19.
- Roosevelt Taylor, 82, American football player (Chicago Bears, San Francisco 49ers, Washington Redskins).
- Ernest Wooton, 78, American politician, member of the Louisiana House of Representatives (2000–2012).
- Joe Yeninas, 86, American cartoonist, illustrator and graphic editor.
- Yogesh, 77, Indian lyricist (Anand, Manzilein Aur Bhi Hain, Manzil).
- Darwin Young, 95, American politician, member of the Idaho House of Representatives (1977–1981).
- Abderrahmane Youssoufi, 96, Moroccan politician, Prime Minister (1998–2002), lung cancer.

=== 30 ===
- Yawovi Agboyibo, 76, Togolese politician, Prime Minister (2006–2007).
- Michael Angelis, 76, British actor (Boys from the Blackstuff, The Liver Birds, Thomas & Friends), heart attack.
- Susan Assmann, 63, American mathematician and statistician, cancer.
- John Cole, 91, Australian-born British geographer.
- Sir John Coward, 82, British vice admiral, Commandant Royal College of Defence Studies (1992–1994) and Lieutenant Governor of Guernsey (1994–2000).
- Phil Croyle, 70, American football player (Houston Oilers, Buffalo Bills), cancer.
- Roger Decock, 93, Belgian racing cyclist, Tour of Flanders winner (1952).
- Bobby Dimond, 90, Australian rugby league footballer (Western Suburbs, New South Wales, national team).
- Elsa Dorfman, 83, American photographer, kidney failure.
- Michel Gauthier, 70, Canadian politician, Leader of the Opposition (1996–1997), MP (1994–2007), and Quebec MNA (1981–1988), lung cancer.
- Chick Gillen, 87, Irish boxer.
- Xavier Grau i Masip, 69, Spanish artist, cancer.
- Józef Grzesiak, 79, Polish Olympic bronze medallist boxer (1964).
- Bob Hammond, 78, Australian Hall of Fame football player (North Adelaide, Norwood) and coach (Sydney Swans), complications from Parkinson's disease.
- Fachtna Joseph Harte, 90, Irish priest.
- Hassan Hosny, 88, Egyptian actor (Nasser 56, El-Limby, Bobbos), heart attack.
- Kim Yong-un, 92, South Korean mathematician.
- Mady Mesplé, 89, French operatic soprano, Parkinson's disease.
- Bobby Morrow, 84, American Hall of Fame sprinter, triple Olympic champion (1956).
- John Nzenze, 80, Kenyan musician, complications from stomach surgery.
- Louise Page, 65, British dramatist, cancer.
- Marshal Perera, 89, Sri Lankan politician.
- Edward O. Phillips, 89, Canadian writer, heart failure.
- Ana Portnoy, 69, Argentine photographer, cancer.
- James Scurlock, 22, American protester, shot.
- Trevor Thomas, 85, British historian.
- Arnold Umbach, 77, American baseball player (Milwaukee/Atlanta Braves), complications from Parkinson's disease.
- Don Weller, 79, English jazz saxophonist.
- Károly Wieland, 86, Hungarian sprint canoeist, Olympic bronze medallist (1956).

=== 31 ===
- Bob Bennett, 86, American Hall of Fame college baseball coach (Fresno State).
- Carina Boberg, 68, Swedish actress.
- Christo, 84, Bulgarian-born American artist (Running Fence).
- David Dees, 62, American artist.
- Dennis L. Freeman, 81, American politician, complications from Parkinson's disease.
- John Furnival, 87, British artist and teacher.
- Kjell B. Hansen, 63, Norwegian politician.
- Danny Havoc, 34, American professional wrestler (CZW), heart failure.
- Dan van Husen, 75, German actor (Fellini's Casanova, Salon Kitty, Nosferatu the Vampyre), COVID-19.
- Pedro Kozak, 71, Argentine football player and manager.
- Norman Lamm, 92, American rabbi, President of Yeshiva University (1976–2003).
- Osia Lewis, 57, American football player (Oregon State, Chicago Bruisers) and coach (Vanderbilt), liver cancer.
- Lewis Marquardt, 83, American politician, member of the South Dakota House of Representatives (1969–1970).
- Muhammad Yahya Rasool Nagari, 75, Pakistani Qāriʾ and Qira'at teacher.
- Bob Northern, 86, American jazz French hornist.
- Tan Aik Mong, 70, Malaysian badminton player, Badminton Asia champion (1971).
- David N. Ott, 83, American politician, member of the Maine House of Representatives (1990–1998, 2004–2006).
- Badrul Feisal Abdul Rahim, 50, Malaysian businessman, Chairman of UMW Holdings (since 2015), heart attack.
- Paddy Ring, 69, Irish hurler.
- Lia Schwartz, 78, Argentine-American literary scholar and historian.
- Jayanendra Chand Thakuri, 80, Nepali actor (Kanchhi, Pheri Bhetaula, Tapasya).
- Irene Triplett, 90, American woman, last living recipient of a Civil War pension.
- William Vobach, 90, American politician, member of the Indiana Senate (1982–1990).
- Peggy Wallace, 73, American politician, member of the Utah House of Representatives (2001–2006).
