= James Redmond =

James Redmond may refer to:

- James Redmond (actor) (born 1971), British actor
- James Redmond (artist) (1901–1944), American painter
- James Redmond (broadcaster) (1918–1999), British engineer and broadcasting pioneer
- James R. Redmond, professor of zoology
