= Masip =

Masip is a Spanish surname. Notable people with this surname include:

- Antonio Masip Hidalgo (born 1946), Spanish politician
- Enric Masip (born 1969), Spanish handball player
- Jordi Masip (born 1989), Spanish football player
- Paulino Masip (1899–1963), Spanish playwright
- Pedro Masip (1918–?), Spanish tennis player
- Vicente Juan Masip (1507–1579), Spanish painter
- Vicente Masip (1475–1545), Spanish painter
- Xavier Grau i Masip (1951–2020), Spanish painter
