= John Peter Sloan =

English actor, comedian, educator, writer and former musician

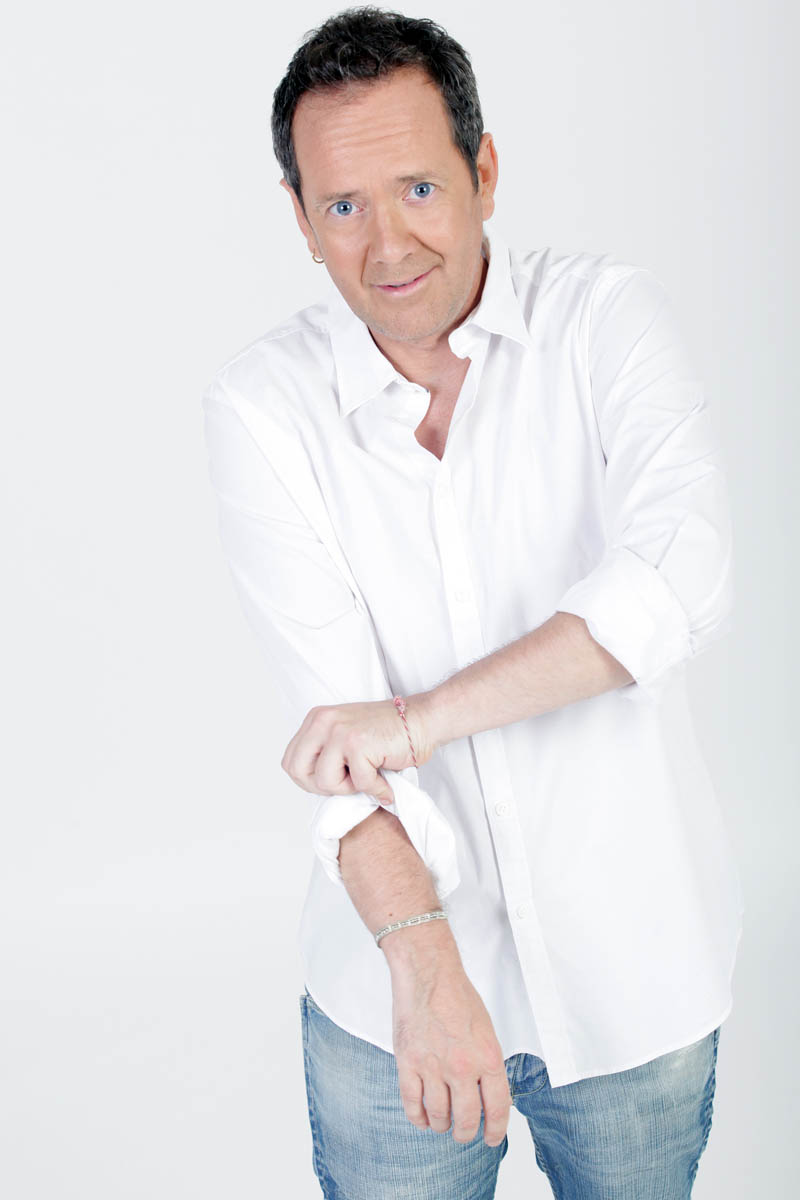
- Born: 27 February 1969; Birmingham, England
- Died: 25 May 2020 (aged 51); Menfi, Italy
- Occupations: Actor, comedian and writer

John Peter Sloan (27 February 1969 – 25 May 2020) was an English actor, comedian, educator, writer and former musician who lived and worked in Italy.

== Biography ==
Sloan was born to an Irish father and English mother. At the age of 16 he left England and traveled to Europe as a singer and guitarist. In 1990 he landed in Italy and, before becoming an author and comic actor, he founded a rock group, The Max, of which he was the frontman. The band remained active until 2000, when his daughter Dhalissia was born. He therefore decided to stop his tour and dedicated himself in Italy to teaching the English language, for which he proposed his own method, in which the playful component plays a decisive role. In 2011 he founded his first school, "John Peter Sloan - the School", in Milan, and in 2013 he opened a second office in Rome.

=== Death ===
Plagued by asthma since birth and with a pulmonary emphysema, he died suddenly on the evening of 25 May 2020, at the age of 51, hit by a serious respiratory crisis in Menfi, Sicily, where he had lived for some years. The news was announced by his colleagues via Facebook.
