= Mimmo Sepe =

Italian comedian (1955–2020)

Mimmo Sepe was born on April 16, 1955, in Naples, Campania, Italy as Domenico Sepe. He was an actor, known for No Thanks, Coffee Makes Me Nervous Now (1982), Nothing Underneath (1985) and Grazie al cielo c'è Totò (1991). He died on May 5, 2020, in Naples .
