= Ubaidur Rahman Zia =

Pakistani Islami scholar (died 2020)

Vice Chairman of All Pakistan Ulema Council
- In office 2005–2020

Personal life
- Died: 27 May 2020

Religious life
- Religion: Islam
- Denomination: Sunni
- Jurisprudence: Hanafi
- Movement: Deobandi

Ubaidur Rahman Zia (Urdu: مولانا عبیدالرحمن ضیاء) was a Pakistani Islamic scholar, who served as the vice chairman of the All Pakistan Ulema Council.

He died on 27 May 2020.
