= Louis Pastore =

American politician (1931–2020)

Louis H. Pastore Jr. (September 9, 1931 – May 1, 2020) was an American politician and businessman.

Pastore was born in Providence, Rhode Island. He graduated from Classical High School and Brown University, and also served in the United States Army before embarking on a lifelong career in the insurance industry. Pastore served as a Democrat in the Rhode Island Senate from 1971 to 1976, retiring to run for the Democratic nomination for Rhode Island's 2nd congressional district, which he lost to incumbent Edward Beard. He died at his home in Cumberland, Rhode Island.
