= Thomas A. Lipo =

American electrical engineer

- Born: February 1, 1938; Milwaukee, Wisconsin, USA
- Died: May 8, 2020 (aged 82)
- Education: Marquette University (BSEE, MSEE), University of Wisconsin-Madison (Ph.D.)
- Known for: Power Electronics, Electric Machines, Adjustable-speed Motor Drives
- Spouse(s): Christine Lipo, Sandra Eimen
- Children: 4
- Scientific career
- Fields: Electrical Engineering
- Workplaces: University of Wisconsin-Madison, Purdue University, General Electric

Thomas A. Lipo (February 1, 1938 – May 8, 2020) was an American electrical engineer and a pioneer in the field of power electronics and electric machines.

== Early life and education ==
He pursued his early education at Marquette University, where he earned both his Bachelor of Science in Electrical Engineering (BSEE) and Master of Science in Electrical Engineering (MSEE) degrees. He then completed his Ph.D. at the University of Wisconsin-Madison in 1968.

== Career and contributions ==
Lipo's career began with a decade-long stint at General Electric's Research and Development Center. In 1979, he joined the faculty at Purdue University. In 1981 he moved to the University of Wisconsin-Madison.

At University of Wisconsin-Madison, Lipo co-founded the Wisconsin Electric Machines and Power Electronics Consortium (WEMPEC) in 1981.

== Awards and honors ==
- Life Fellow of the IEEE
- Member of the National Academy of Engineering
- Member of the Royal Academy of Engineering
- IEEE Medal in Power Engineering
- Hilldale Award in Physical Sciences from UW-Madison
