= William W. Snavely =

US Air Force lieutenant general (1920–2020)

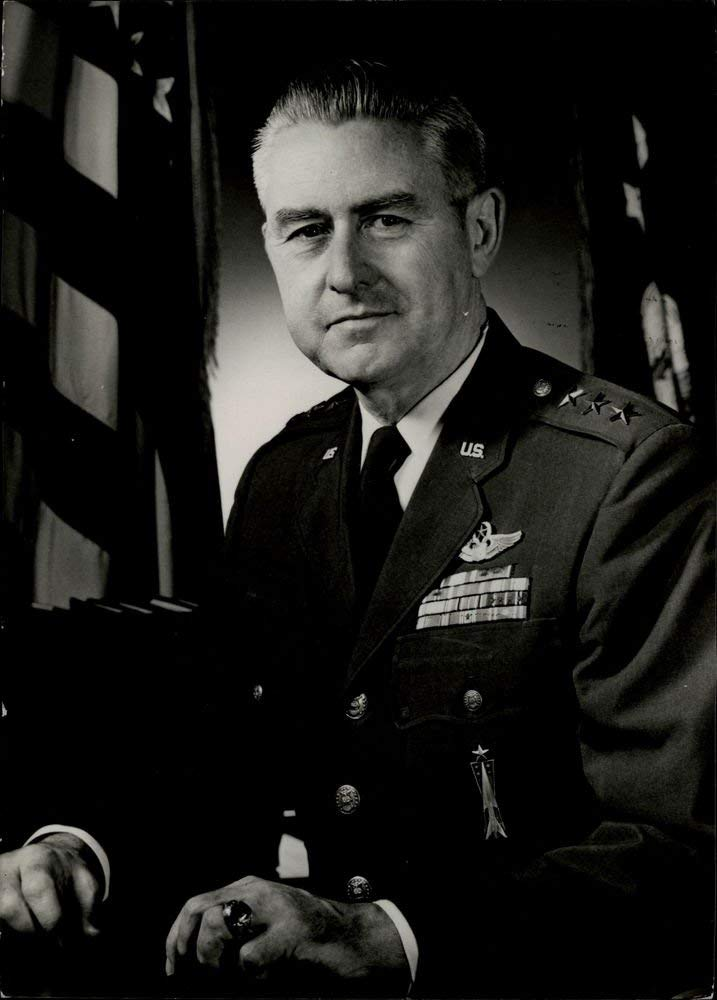
- Born: 5 April 1920; Los Angeles, California U.S.
- Died: 14 May 2020 (aged 100); San Antonio, Texas, U.S.
- Military career
- Allegiance: United States
- Branch: United States Air Force
- Service years: 1943–1975
- Rank: Lieutenant general
- Conflicts: World War II

William Wayne Snavely (5 April 1920 – 14 May 2020) was a lieutenant general in the United States Air Force who served as Deputy Chief of Staff for systems and logistics of the United States Air Force from 1973 to 1975. Snavely died in 2020 at the age of 100.

== Effective dates of promotion ==
Insignia	Rank	Date
	Lieutenant general	1 February 1973
	Major general	1 August 1969
	Brigadier general	1 September 1966
	Colonel	15 June 1954
	Lieutenant colonel	20 February 1951
	Major	27 March 1945
	Captain	20 October 1944
	First lieutenant	1 December 1943
	Second lieutenant	1 June 1943
