= Bryan Wharton =

British photojournalist and photographer (1934–2020)

Bryan Wharton (1934 – 23 May 2020) was an internationally renowned photo-journalist and British photographer. He won many awards for his work for The Sunday Times. He covered several topics including wars and natural disasters, but he is perhaps best known for his incisive portraits of well-known personalities, many of whom became his closest friends.

Wharton died on 23 May 2020.
