= Malibongwe Gcwabe =

South African gospel singer and pastor (1969–2020)

- Born: Malibongwe Gcwabe; Worcester, Western Cape, South Africa
- Origin: Worcester, Western Cape, South Africa
- Died: May 13, 2020 (aged 50–51) East London, Eastern Cape, South Africa
- Years active: 1987–2020

Malibongwe Gcwabe (June 12, 1969 – 13 May 2020) was a South African gospel singer and pastor of Remnant Ministries.

== Career ==
Born in Worcester, Western Cape, South Africa, Gcwabe founded a singing group called "New Creation" with his siblings, before moving to East London, Eastern Cape, where he joined the Mdantsane-based Youth With Mission in the 1990s releasing six albums with them. He left the group in 2004 to forge a solo career releasing his first album Umlilo kaJesu under Amanxusa Big Fish Records. He released a further four records with them before starting his own record label Malibongwe Music Productions.

== Personal life ==
Gcwabe met his first wife Ntomboxolo Mthombeni in 2001 and they had a daughter together; however they divorced in 2011. He then married his second wife Brenda and they had two children together before he died of a heart attack on 13 May 2020 in East London.

== Partial discography ==
- Siyakudumisa, 2007
- all is well, 2008
- Isimemo, 2009
- The Other Side, 2010
- Iyo Calvary, 2010
- Uthixo Omkhulu, 2011
- The Best Of Malibongwe, 2011
- Yehova Ulungile, 2012 (with Remnant Brothers)
- Akahluleki, 2013
- Inzulu, 20 years of God's favour, 2014
- 'Ndakuva Ndiyaphendula, 2015
- All Is Well, 2008
- Isimemo, 2010
- Christmas with Mzansi men of Gospel, Vol.1., 2016
- Heritage Day Celebration Hits, 2016
- Kungegazi, 2016
- Ndiwabonile Amandla Akho (Educational Praise & Worship), 2017
- Urban Gospel Special, 2017
