= Warren DeBoer =

American anthropologist (died 2020)

Warren DeBoer (died May 24, 2020) was an American anthropologist specializing in ethnography and archaeology of the Americas. He particularly focused on ethnohistory and ethnoarchaeology of South America.

DeBoer received his PhD from UC-Berkelely in 1972. He taught at Queens College, New York, from 1972 until his retirement in 2012. DeBoer was the 1999 recipient of the Society for American Archaeology's "Excellence in Ceramic Studies Award."

He died in New York of esophageal cancer.

== Selected publications ==
- 2001. "The big drink: feast and forum in the Upper Amazon". In: Feasting in the Archaeological Record. Edited by Michael Dietler and Brian Hayden, pp. 215–240. Washington, D. C.: Smithsonian Institution Press.
- 1996. Traces Behind the Esmeraldas Shore: Prehistory of the Santiago-Cayapas Region, Ecuador. University of Alabama Press, Tuscaloosa.
- 1986. "Pillage and Production in the Amazon: A View through the Conibo of the Ucayali Basin, Eastern Peru". World Archaeology 18(2): 231–246. PDF file
- 1981. "Buffer Zones in the Cultural Ecology of Aboriginal Amazonia: An Ethnohistorical Approach." American Antiquity 46(2): 364–377.
