= Ruy Fausto =

Brazilian academic and philosopher (1935–2020)

- Born: 1935; São Paulo, Brazil
- Died: May 1, 2020 (aged 84–85); Paris, France
- Education: University of Paris 1 Pantheon-Sorbonne
- Occupations: Philosopher, professor of philosophy
- Employer: University of São Paulo
- Known for: Marxist theory
- Notable work: Marx: Lógica e Política
- Title: Emeritus Professor
- Movement: Marxism

Ruy Fausto (1935 – May 1, 2020) was a Brazilian philosopher who taught at the University of São Paulo.

Fausto was born in São Paulo, and received his Ph.D. from University of Paris 1 Pantheon-Sorbonne in 1981. He was given the title of emeritus professor in 1998, by the University of São Paulo. With his thesis Marx: Lógica e Política (in English, Marx: Logic and Politics), he was considered one of the main Brazilian marxist theorists. He was the brother of historian Boris Fausto and pathologist Nelson Fausto. He died on May 1, 2020, in Paris, France, after having a heart attack.
