= Sandro Petrone =

Italian journalist (1954–2020)

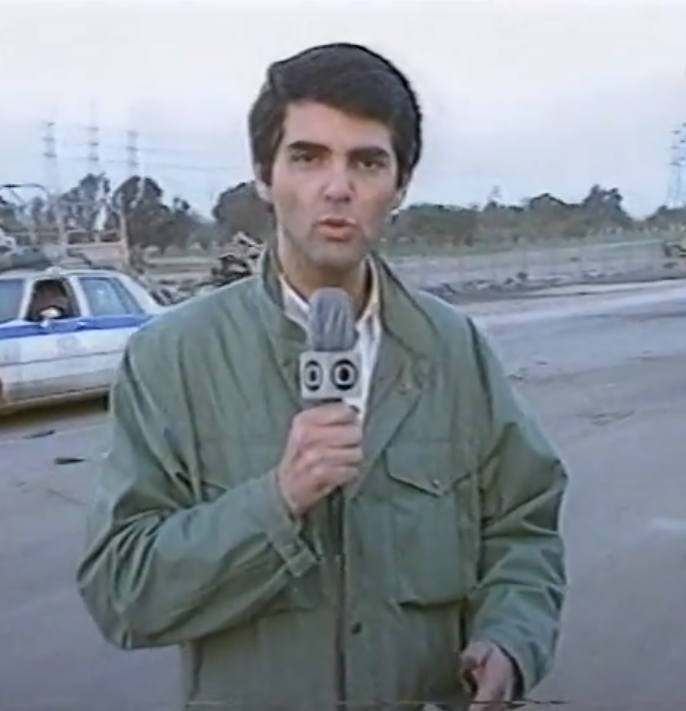
Italian journalist Sandro Petrone in 1991 in Kuwait City

Sandro Petrone (2 February 1954 – 15 May 2020) was an Italian war correspondent and anchorman for RAI, Italian State Radio and Television, who worked as editor for foreign news for TG2. He was a professor of Mass Communication and Journalism at the University of Rome La Sapienza and the University of Languages and Communication IULM in Milan and author of several works. He made his debut at the age of eighteen as a copywriter in the family advertising business, Octa Marketing and Communication (ASSAP - Assocomunicazione), in which he himself gave life to an audiovisual sector. After his first experiences in private radio stations, he began his career in journalism, first with newspapers and, beginning in 1979, in Rai, where he led programs and participated in innovative projects, such as Radiosoftware in 1982, the first experiment of radio broadcasting using computers and established an interactive circuit with listeners. From 1987 forward, he has developed wide international experience in the Brazilian Telemontecarlo (Rede Globo), as home and foreign correspondent, war reporter and anchorman. He returned to work for RAI in 1993 as anchorman and key foreign correspondent. He taught Mass Communication from 1989 in Italy and abroad in a number of prestigious universities and international organizations, such as EJTA (European Journalism Training Association). His book The Language of the News - the tools and rules of journalism, published by Rizzoli, is now in its second edition . He has cultivated a passion for the arts, particularly in the fields of music and television, since his youth as both writer and event organizer.

In the seventies, Petrone was an exponent of the so-called Vesu-wave, a Neapolitan cultural and musical current that was named after the Vesuvius Volcano as an eruption of art and creativity, celebrated by artists such as Andy Warhol.

Following legal studies, he continued his studies specializing in Mass Communication and Interpersonal Communication.

As War Correspondent, in 1991 he was the first Italian to broadcast live from liberated Kuwait, where he went in following the U.S Marines. Subsequently, he covered the wars in former Yugoslavia, Kosovo, Iraq, Afghanistan, Lebanon, Libya. He was a frontline reporter during the War on terrorism, starting from the September 11 attacks in the U.S. and the March 11 attacks in Madrid. He reported on the political and nuclear crisis in Iran as well as the so-called Arab Spring, in Tunisia and Egypt. He was also the first Italian journalist to cover major events employing his own camera during the Gulf War, the collapse of the USSR and the war in Yugoslavia. He worked in foreign correspondence offices in New York, London, Paris and Moscow. He followed all the U.S. presidential elections since 1992, taking long-term residence in the United States for complete coverage. As a documentary filmmaker, he won the Federchimica Award in 1988 with an investigation into high-risk factories. In 1994, his behind- the-scenes in-depth report on prostitution revealed a radical transformation of the sex market in Italy. In addition, he has created documentaries reporting on Iraq, Iran, the U.S. Welfare Reform, the British royal family and on Italian musicians emigrated to the United States. In 1993, with the seven-episode program Antennopolis, he gave a candid picture of the state of Italian television, and in particular the political bias on information, in the midst of the Tangentopoli scandal.

He has always been an adamant critic of the system of awarding public contracts and has fought for the freedom of the press and impartiality in information and for journalism as an instrument for the democratic control of institutions. "Those who provide information are at the service of citizens. This information is needed for people to live, to have a fair representation of the world in which they interact. Playing tricks with the cards means playing tricks on people's lives. It is equivalent to murder. Physical, not only ideological" (Petrone, The Language of the News).

He was a university professor and has taught in a number of schools of journalism in Italy and abroad. Beyond his teaching at the University of Rome La Sapienza and the University IULM in Milan, he has taught journalism and communication for institutions such as the Italian National Order of Journalists, the European Journalism Training Association (EJTA), the Italian Switzerland course of Journalism, the School of Journalism in Perugia and Bologna, the faculty of Communication of the University of Macerata, the Rai School for Journalism and the Media Institute of Tirana.

After leaving his youth as a singer-songwriter in Naples and the company of friends Edoardo Bennato, Enzo Gragnaniello, Pino Daniele and Jenny Sorrenti to dedicate himself to journalism, he continued to write songs, often inspired by current events or situations he encountered in the countries he visited. In more recent years, he has collaborated with several young musicians. He writes on Myspace: "I like to tell the stories of the men and the events that serve to denounce abuse that threatens democracy. For this reason, I was a singer of the Neapolitan Power movement when I could not be a journalist yet. As a journalist, I continued to compose, especially when reporting from abroad; I wrote words driven by emotions that could not find a place in television journalism. They are songs that others can sing. Music also serves the purpose of keeping people alive. Music is life. And words in music are a common thread in our existence".

Petrone died in Rome on 15 May 2020, at the age of 65. He was battling with an illness since 2017.

== Music ==
In all his years of "musical silence", Petrone continued his collaboration with the Neapolitan percussionist Tony Cercola. After the attacks in the United States of September 11, 2001, the Second Gulf War, the massacre of Nasiriyah, the earthquake of San Giuliano, and the events of 11 March in Madrid, it was Cercola who encouraged Petrone to resume his activity as a songwriter to allow expression for the strong emotions which had been "kept in check by the daily recounting in journalism of such events". After winning the first City of Santa Marinella Award in 2003 with the collection of songs Blues for the Blues (original Italian title Blues in Blu), he began to devote more of his time to music, developing links with the avant-garde musical scene and promoting the experimentation of young Italian musicians.

On an August night in 2007, in the gardens of Piazza Giovenale in Rome, I come home blues, the first song of a new cycle, took shape and was dedicated to the world as seen through the eyes of the correspondent. At that time, a new musical project was born out of Petrone's meeting with the musician Martino De Cesare from Apulia. Between 2007 and 2008, they recorded a limited edition album entitled Alex is back (after a long time) for the virtual recording label Inconscio Label. The work was recorded during a tour of ten venues in Italy and abroad, in improvised recording studios in private homes, thanks to new technologies and with the participation of artists over the Internet.

On 8 July 2010, the CD Last Call - Notes from a Foreign Correspondent was released, containing eleven tracks of old and new songs by Petrone, one bonus track, and one ghost track; some were written with Tony Cercola and all were arranged by Martino De Cesare, who also plays all the guitars. Many young musicians participated and the album was recorded travelling between various Italian cities and New York, in more than a dozen studios.

== Publications ==
Among his publications are his manual of television journalism, The Language of News (Rizzoli, 2011) and The Television Interview (2004). In 2003, he was awarded the Santa Marinella Award for "Blues for the blues", a book which collects his songs from the seventies (currently out of print). The lyrics of Blues for the blues were the subject of analysis of the book "The Tale of the facts – The Journalism of Creative Space", in the chapter entitled Pirandello, Prisco, Petrone ..., by Franco Zangrilli, Professor of Italian and Comparative Literature at the City University of New York. He collaborates with the magazine Il Mulino: Problems of Information, Angelo Agostini, editor.
