= Gregorio Scalise =

Italian poet (1939–2020)

Gregorio Scalise (25 January 1939 – 11 May 2020) was an Italian poet and dramatist.

Scalise was born in Catanzaro, and brought up in Udine. He lived in Bologna from 1967 onwards, working for a time at a modern art gallery. He wrote for newspapers and magazines and for stage and screen. His collections of poetry included A Capo (1968), L'Erba al suo erbario (1969) and Gli artisti (1986). His first play, Grazie vivissime per il recordo, came out in 1978, and his last, Servi di scena, in 1992.

In 2009, he developed a debilitating condition that stopped him writing, and he was cared for by his partner, the journalist Michela Turra.

== Biography ==
He was born in Catanzaro to Giuseppe, a lawyer in the state and Tecla Cottone, daughter of a music teacher. She lived her first years in Calabria, then she left Catanzaro for Udine, where she moved with her family and where she spent her adolescence.

The mother disappears young and the child alternates periods spent by relatives in Trento and Bologna in Udine: after the classical high school in Udine, he attended the faculty of law in Trieste, then moved on to that of letters at the old university, graduating however in Bologna in 1967.

He works as a customs inspector at the Austrian border, insurer, professor in middle and high schools, teacher for the disabled, librarian, inspector at the Gallery of Modern Art in Bologna, finally a teacher of Literature and Philosophy of the Theater at the Academy of Fine Arts. in Bologna. All these experiences will make Scalise a bit skeptical about the vision of professional and non-literati.

He also attended study courses abroad, in Vienna, Nice and Monaco, where he participated in the French and Italian '68. These are the years of his cultural and intellectual training: he approaches modern philosophy, German literature, reads texts on sociology and Aesthetics.

The political and cultural climate is that described in his books: A capo (1968), L'erba al sua herbarium (1969), published with Adriano Spatola's Geiger publishing house.

This is followed by Man in the Case (1969) in numbered copies, now out of print, a visual text where the written commentary acts as a counterpoint to the images.

In the seventies, Scalise approaches all those poets and intellectuals who meet in Rome at the Beat 72 shows (Renzo Paris, Biancamaria Frabotta, the creator of those meetings, Franco Cordelli ...).

He will participate in one of those evenings with the text L'incubo dei novissimi in 1977: in the initial project, which was later rejected, ten children should have read texts of the novissimi, because - this is the thesis - "the language is not changed only once but its change is continuous ”.

In 1979 Scalise published Twelve Poems with the preface by Giovanni Raboni, who signals a Scalisian maturity compared to previous years, but without losing that unicum that binds all his collections.

In 1982 the poet arrives at the Arnoldo Mondadori Editore publishing house with La Resistenza aria, which wins the Vallombrosa prize, together with Piero Chiara. The book collects the experiences gained after '68 (the most indicative text in this sense is entitled The signature of Shakespeare) and a systematic discourse is started, with the desire to reconstruct the syntactic and logical links, remaining on this side of the usual lyricism and with predictable and discounted outcomes.

The world of Milanese poets becomes important for Scalise, whose professionalism and seriousness he respected.

The poetry collections Gli Artisti (1986) with a preface by Maurizio Cucchi and Danny Rose (1989) date back to the Eighties, in which an increasingly logical and dry discourse is recovered.

In 1984, with the essay Bruciapensieri, he had a first reflection on poetry and invention, until, in the nineties, the break with the recent past led him to publish two pamphlets: Ma what's to laugh about ?, (1993), against the TV comedians and the misery that derives from the complicit society that accepts and blesses all this, and Talk show system (1995), against the talk shows and the Italian television situation of those years.

A poetic silence follows, interrupted in 1997 by Poems of the nineties, which, however, tells the present in verse with all its wars, without neglecting considerations on the language, on the word with an afterthought on its generation. The same year he is a guest of the City of Recanati Award.

The publications of this period are almost "poetic manifestos" in which we look at the experience of the neo-avant-garde season which theoretically ended a few years earlier. In this period Scalise actively participates in the militant culture without belonging to specific groups.
