= Roland Povinelli =

French politician (1941–2020)

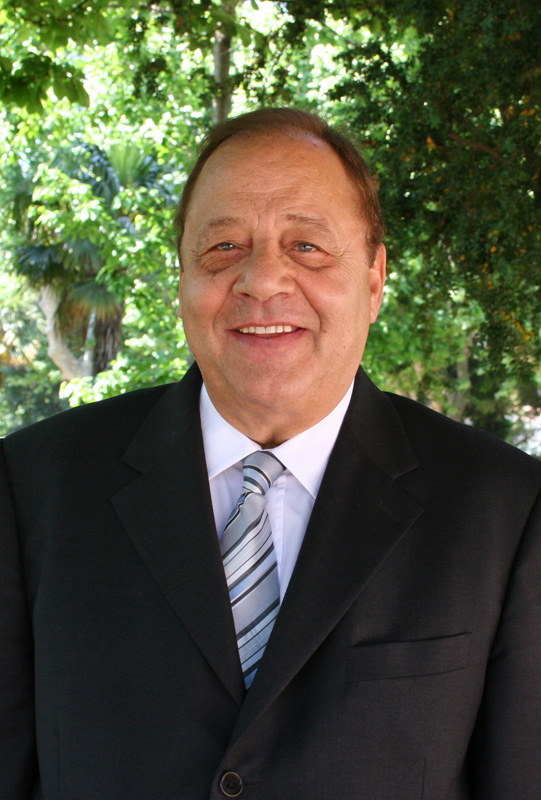

Senator for Bouches-du-Rhône
- In office 2008–2014

Mayor of Allauch
- In office 1975 – 11 May 2020

Personal details
- Born: 9 August 1941
- Died: 11 May 2020 (aged 78)
- Party: PS

Roland Povinelli (9 August 1941 – 11 May 2020) was a French politician who served as a member of the Senate of France from 2008 to 2014, representing the Bouches-du-Rhône department. He served as mayor of Allauch, a town near Marseille, from 1975 until his death in 2020. He was a member of the Socialist Party.
