= Abdiwali Olad Kanyare =

Somali footballer (1980–2020)

Personal information
- Date of birth: 15 May 1980
- Place of birth: Beledweyne, Somalia
- Date of death: 7 May 2020 (aged 39)
- Place of death: Afgooye, Somalia
- Position: Goalkeeper

Senior career*
Years	Team	Apps	(Gls)
- Bariga Dhexe
- Horseed
- Banadir

International career
2002–2015	Somalia		
- * Club domestic league appearances and goals

Abdiwali Olad Kanyare (15 May 1980 – 7 May 2020) was a Somali footballer who played as a goalkeeper for the Somalia national team. After his retirement, he became a prominent goalkeeping coach.

== Career ==
Domestically, Olad Kanyare played for Bariga Dhexe, Horseed and Banadir. Olad Kanyare represented the Somalia national football team, before his international retirement in 2015. Following his playing career, Olad Kanyare became goalkeeping coach for Somalia's youth teams. He had the same role at Mogadishu City Club at the time of his death.

== Death ==
On 7 May 2020, Olad Kanyare was shot dead in a mosque in Afgooye by unknown assailants whilst performing tarawih prayers as part of Ramadan. He was buried the following day.
