= Stéphane Dupont =

Belgian radio broadcaster (1950–2020)

- Born: 15 February 1950; Auderghem, Belgium
- Died: 5 May 2020 (aged 70); Liège, Belgium
- Occupation: Radio Broadcaster

Stéphane Dupont (15 February 1950 – 5 May 2020) was a Belgian radio broadcaster and producer. He worked primarily for RTBF.

== Biography ==
Dupont described himself as a "radio walker". After studying at INSAS, he worked for the magazine Contraste from 1974 to 1975. From 1978 to 1979, he hosted and produced the rock music radio show Radio-Hot-Dog every Saturday. Around 1984, he worked on the daily cultural radio show 18h au Sud. He then participated in shows such as Faits-Divers, La quatrième dimension, and Le Bar de l’Estacade. Starting in 2005, Dupont began hosting the show Psychédélique Boum-Tchac, a historical program. He retired on 30 November 2010.

Stéphane Dupont died on 5 May 2020 at the age of 70 in Liège.
