= Mare Vint =

Estonian graphic artist (1942–2020)

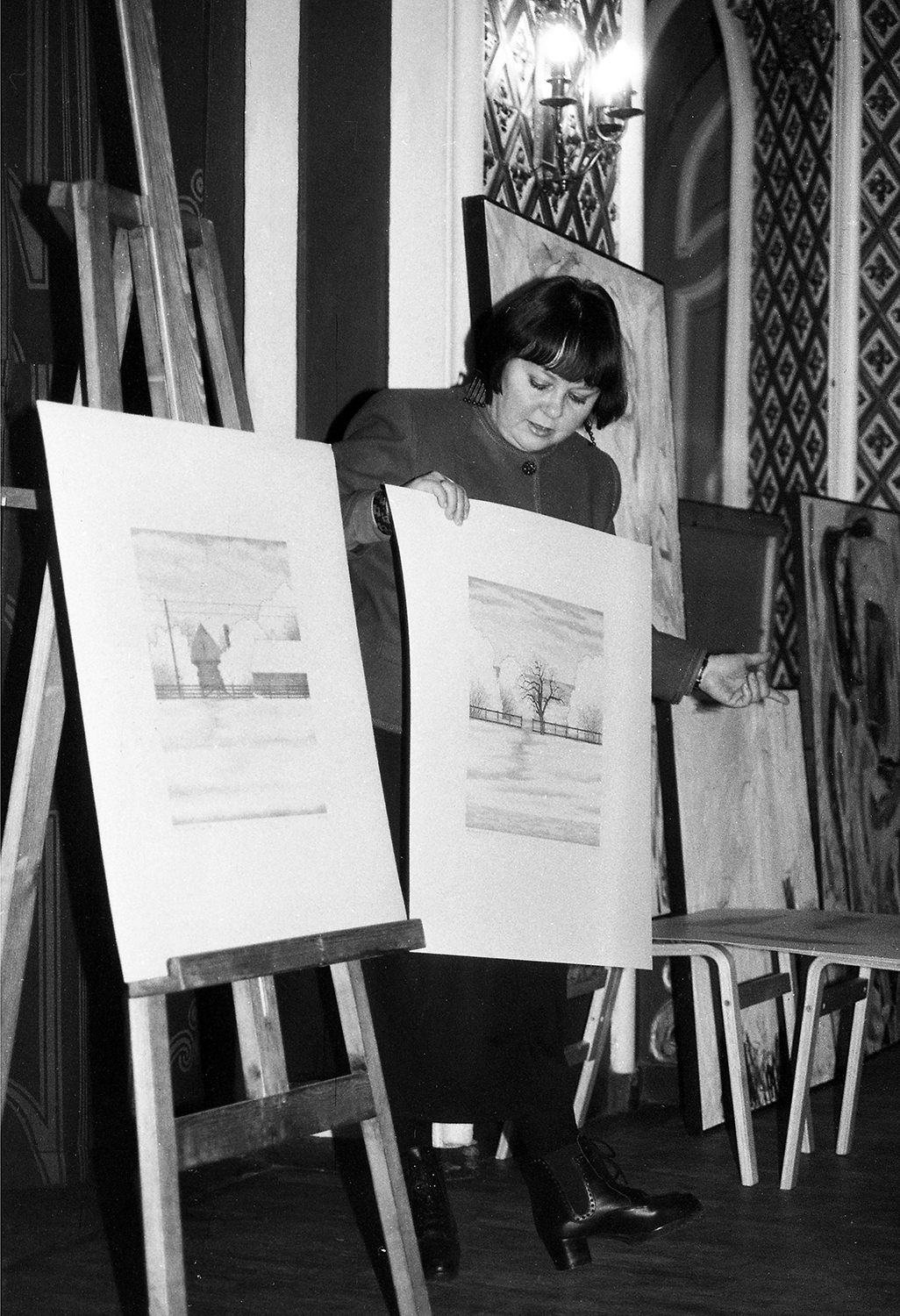
- Mare Vint in 1994
- Born: Mare Mänd; 15 September 1942; Tallinn, Estonia
- Died: 10 May 2020 (aged 77)
- Occupation: Graphic artist
- Years active: 1967–2020
- Spouse: Tõnis Vint (m. 1967; div. 1976) Andres Tolts (m. 1987; died 2014)

Mare Vint (born Mare Mänd; 15 September 1942 – 10 May 2020) was an Estonian graphic artist. In her work, Vint mostly depicted an "ideal landscape".

== Life ==
Vint was born in Tallinn, where she graduated from 9th Secondary School in 1961. From 1962 to 1967, she studied at the Estonian SSR State Art Institute (now Estonian Academy of Arts); she graduated as a glass artist. From 1967 to 1969, she worked as a High School art teacher in Tallinn, then as a freelance artist. She was a member of the Estonian Artists' Union since 1973.

She worked in ink and pencil drawing, and mostly lithography since 1972. In Mare Vint's work of the second half of the 1960s and the beginning of the 1970s, a style emerged, characterized by the black-and-white contrast of the drawings, in which color is more conditional.

She was awarded the Order of the White Star IV class, in 2015.
