= Allah Yar Ansari =

Pakistani politician

Haji Allah Yar Ansari (1 May 1943 – 1 May 2020) was a Pakistani politician who was a member of the Provincial Assembly of the Punjab between 1997 and 1999.

== Early life and career ==
Born in Khushab District, Allah Yar received his Intermediate in 1962 from the Government College Joharabad. He was elected to the Provincial Assembly of the Punjab in 1997. He was also a businessman who was serving as the vice president of the Pakistan Muslim League and as president of Jamiat Al-Ansar since 1988. He served as a councilor in a municipal corporation in Sargodha from 1987 to 1997.

== Death ==
In May 2020, he died on the day of his 77th birthday due to COVID-19 during the COVID-19 pandemic in Pakistan.
