= Wayne P. Anderson =

American psychology professor

Wayne Perry Anderson (December 6, 1929 – May 29, 2020) was an American professor of psychology at University of Missouri in Columbia, Missouri. He taught at Missouri for 32 years beginning in 1963. After his retirement in 1995, he continued to teach for several years a summer course on human sexuality for undergraduates. He is an instructor in the Osher Lifelong Learning Center, a correspondent and travel newspaper columnist, and author of more than a dozen books.

Anderson's international experience began in 1972 with a Master's Level visiting professorship for the U.S. Air Force Education System in Germany, Holland, England, Italy, and Spain. In 1989 Anderson was part of the University of Missouri Abroad program and taught one semester in London, England.

Anderson was also adjunct professor at Columbia College's Criminal Justice Program where he taught a master's level course in Crisis management.

During the 1990s and into the early 2000s, Anderson was a team member of the International Center for Psychosocial Trauma and has worked in Palestine, Bosnia, and Earthquake zones training teachers, physicians and mental health workers.

== Early life ==
A child of immigrant Swedes, Anderson grew up in Jamestown, North Dakota. He graduated in 1947 after attending a number of high schools. In 1952 Anderson enrolled in Jamestown College. He began graduate studies in 1952 in Jamestown at the University of North Dakota, then transferred to the University of Missouri – Columbia.

== Personal life and death ==
Wayne Anderson married Carla Lee Erickson November 22, 1952 after beginning graduate studies in Jamestown.

Anderson died of cancer in Columbia, Missouri on May 29, 2020.

== Awards and honors ==
- Winner of the Purple Chalk Award for undergraduate teaching and the Gold Chalk Award for graduate teaching in 1990 at the University of Missouri – Columbia.
- Awarded the first William T. Kemper Fellow for Excellence in Teaching, 1991, University of Missouri, Columbia, Missouri.
- Anderson was the nominee of University of Missouri-Columbia campus for the 1993 and 1994 competition for the University system's award for outstanding teaching.
- Inducted into the Jamestown College Alumni Hall of Fame, Educator and Humanitarian, 29 September 2000, Jamestown, North Dakota.
- 2009 Humanitarian Award, Advisory Board of the University of Missouri International Center for Psychosocial Trauma in recognition of lifetime work to improving the lives of people including Children worldwide, 1 October 2009.

== Books ==
- Stress Management for Law Enforcement Officers, Anderson, Wayne; Swenson, David & Clay, Daniel, (1995) Prentice Hall
- Bulimia: Book for Therapist and Client, Barbara G Bauer, Wayne P Anderson, Robert H. Hyatt, Accelerated Development Inc. 1986X
- Travels Into Our Past: America's Living History Museums & Historical Sites, AKA-Publishing, 2013
- Our Swedish Roots: Stories about our Mostly Above Average Ancestors, AKA-Publishing, 2013
- Offbeat Travel: Exploring the unexpected & mysterious, AKA-Publishing, 2014
- Georgia and Alabama: Memorable Sites to Explore, AKA-Publishing, 2015
- Dear Jeril... Love, Dad, AKA-Publishing, 2015
- Exploring the Striking Contrasts of India, AKA-Publishing, 2015
- Christina's Saga: From Norway to Dakota Territory, AKA-Publishing, 2010, 2016
- Unforgettable World Wonders, AKA-Publishing, 2016
- Travels Into Our Past: Volume Two: America's Living History Museums & Historical Sites, AKA-Publishing, 2017
- Native Americans: Cultures Past and Present, AKA-Publishing, 2018
- The Changing Face of Sex, AKA-Publishing, 2013
