= Victor J. Hugo Jr. =

US Army major general (1931–2020)

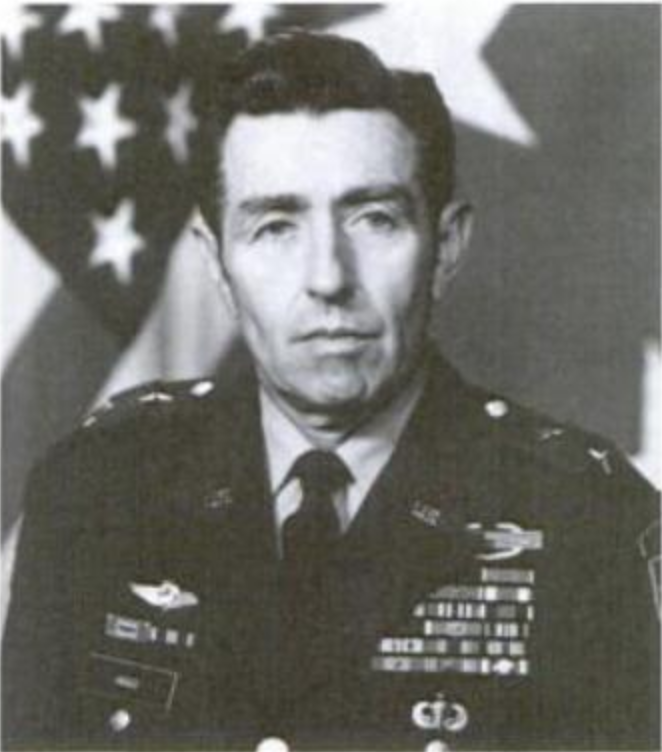
- Born: May 28, 1931; Beverly, Massachusetts U.S.
- Died: May 11, 2020 (aged 88)
- Military career
- Allegiance: United States
- Branch: United States Army
- Service years: 1954–1987
- Rank: Major general
- Commands: 32nd Army Air Defense Command
- Conflicts: Korean War, Vietnam War

Victor Joseph Hugo Jr. (28 May 1931 – 11 May 2020) was a major general in the United States Army. He served as Commanding General of the 32nd Army Air Defense Command. Raised in Marblehead, Massachusetts, he graduated from the United States Military Academy in 1954.
