= Nita Pippins =

American nurse and AIDS activist (1927–2020)

- Born: February 2, 1927; Dothan
- Died: May 10, 2020 (aged 93); Manhattan
- Alma mater: Florida State University
- Occupation: Nurse and activist

Jessie Juanita Pippins (February 2, 1927 – May 10, 2020) was an American registered nurse and AIDS activist. She was the co-founder of Miracle House, a housing facility for family members of those affected by HIV and AIDS.

== Early life ==
Jessie Juanita Roberts was born in Dothan, Alabama, the daughter of Alto Lee Roberts and Junie Roberts. Her father was a cotton farmer. She studied nursing at Florida State University.

== Career and advocacy ==
Pippins worked as a psychiatric nurse before her retirement in 1981, superintendent of the psychiatric unit at University Hospital in Pensacola. In 1987, Pippins relocated from Pensacola to New York to care for her actor son, Nick Pippin, and developed relationships with his friends. After Pippin died in 1990, Pippins co-founded and volunteered with Miracle House, to provide housing and support for out-of-town families of AIDS patients. "If I can help these families get to New York and survive it, then all these boys wouldn't have to die without their mothers." She also founded a program to reunite AIDS patients with their estranged families.

Nick Pippin's partner, Dennis Daniel, wrote a tribute to Pippins in 2007, marking her 80th birthday, titled "The Mother of Us All." In 2010, NY1 News featured Pippins as the New Yorker of the Week.

== Personal life ==
Nita Roberts married Joseph S. Pippins. They had one child together, Nick, before they divorced in 1981. She died from COVID-19 on Mother's Day, May 10, 2020, at age 93.
