= Aldo Nardin =

Italian footballer (1947–2020)

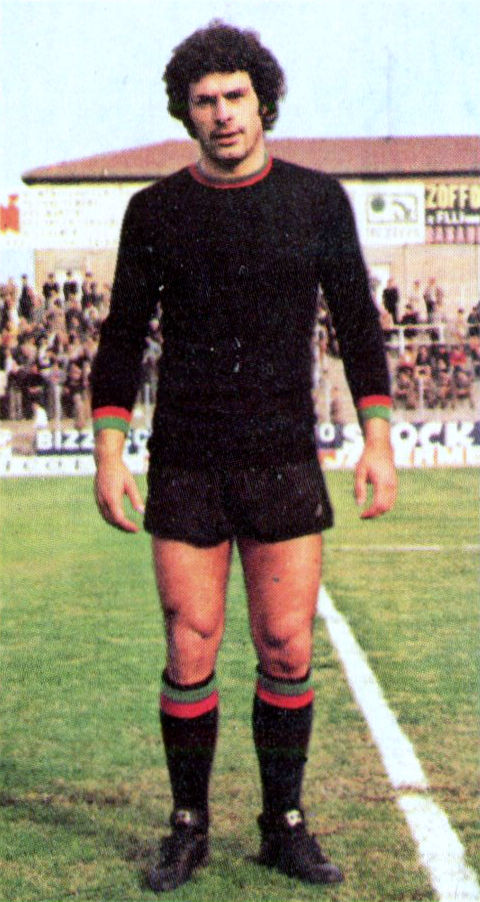
- Nardin with Ternana in 1974

Personal information
- Date of birth: 17 November 1947
- Place of birth: Gorizia, Italy
- Date of death: 27 May 2020 (aged 72)
- Place of death: Arezzo, Italy
- Position: Goalkeeper

Youth career
- 1961–1962: Juventina di Sant'Andrea
- 1962–1963: Arezzo
- 1963–1964: Juventus
- 1964–1965: Arezzo

Senior career*
Years	Team	Apps	(Gls)
1965–1971	Arezzo	86	(0)
1965–1966	→ Alghero (loan)		
1971–1972	Varese	18	(0)
1972–1973	Napoli	1	(0)
1973–1976	Ternana	101	(0)
1976–1980	Lecce	123	(0)
1980–1981	Lazio	12	(0)
1981–1982	Foggia		
1982–1983	Civitavecchia		
Total		341	(0)

International career
1970	Italy U21	1	(0)
1971	Italy U23	1	(0)
- * Club domestic league appearances and goals

Aldo Nardin (17 November 1947 – 27 May 2020) was an Italian professional footballer who played as a goalkeeper.

== Career ==
Born in Gorizia, Nardin played for Juventina di Sant'Andrea, Arezzo, Juventus, Alghero, Varese, Napoli, Ternana, Lecce, Lazio, Foggia and Civitavecchia.

He also represented Italy at youth international level, earning one cap for both of the under-21 and under-23 national teams.

== Death ==
He died in Arezzo on 27 May 2020, aged 73.
