= Giulio Savelli =

Italian politician (1941–2020)

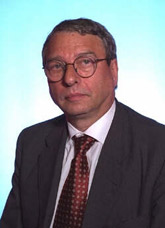

Giulio Savelli (27 September 1941 – 12 May 2020) was an Italian politician and publisher.

== Biography ==
Born in Rome, Italy, on 27 September 1941, Savelli co-founded the publishing house Samonà e Savelli alongside Giuseppe Paolo Samonà in 1963. Samonà left the business in 1968, and Savelli ran Samonà e Savelli on his own. The publishing house released 1,200 titles, among them La strage di Stato (1970), about the Piazza Fontana bombing, and Porci con le ali (1976), co-authored by Marco Lombardo Radice and Lidia Ravera. Savelli retired from publishing in 1976, leaving Samonà e Savelli to an editorial collective. The publishing company closed in 1982.

Savelli was elected to the Chamber of Deputies as a member of Forza Italia. He sat on the Legislature XIII, which met between 1996 and 2001.

Savelli was married to the journalist Pialuisa Bianco. He died in Rome on 12 May 2020.
