= Will Forsyth =

English rugby league footballer (1996–2020)

Personal information
- Full name: William Forsyth
- Born: 1996
- Died: 11 May 2020 (aged 24)

Playing information
- Position: Fullback
Club
Years	Team	Pld	T	G	FG	P
2015	Dewsbury Rams	2	7	0	0	0
2016	Hemel Stags	2	15	0	0	0
	Total	4	22	0	0	0

William Forsyth (1996 – 11 May 2020) was a British professional rugby league footballer who played as a fullback for the Dewsbury Rams in the Kingstone Press Championship. He later played two games for Hemel Stags.

Forsyth died on 11 May 2020, at the age of 24 from cancer.
