= William Whitehall =

American politician (1934–2020)

William Edward Whitehall (December 13, 1934 – May 17, 2020) was an American politician.

Whitehall was born in Chicago, Illinois. He served in the Missouri House of Representatives from 1983 to 1987 and was a Republican. Whitehall worked in education as a teacher, principal, and administrator. He lived in Okeechobee, Florida.
