= Lidia Marchetti =

Italian basketball player (1940–2020)

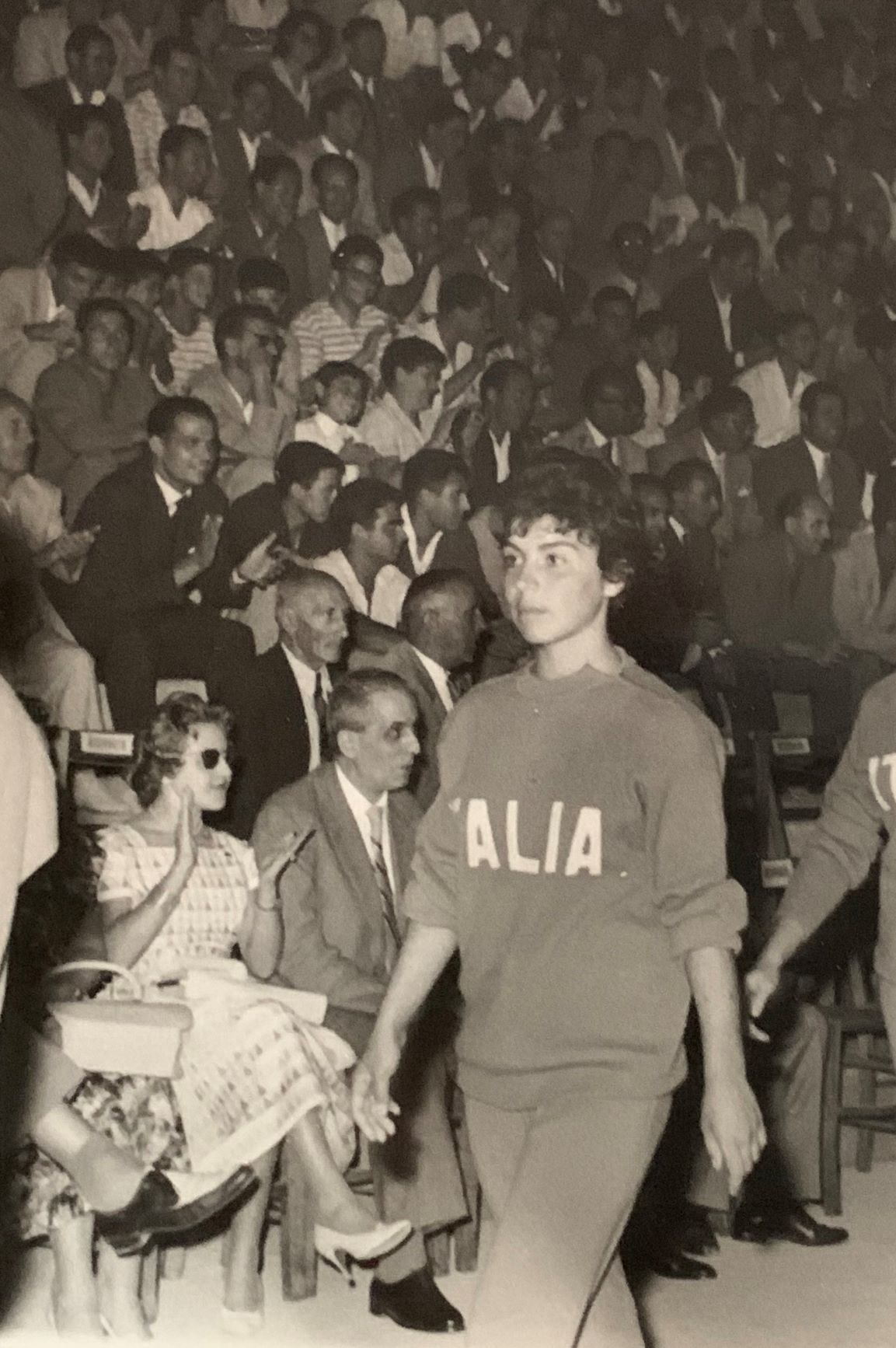

Personal information
- Born: December 20, 1940 Faenza, Italy
- Died: May 9, 2020 (aged 79)

Career history
- Club Atletico Faenza Pallacanestro

Lidia Marchetti (20 December 1940 – 9 May 2020) was an Italian basketball player. She played at the Serie A1 with her club Club Atletico Faenza Pallacanestro. She was part of the women’s Italian National Team playing 33 matches. During her career, her average score was usually over 10 points.

== Career ==
Marchetti was born in Faenza, but lived most of her life in Cesena. When she was 16 years old, she started playing at her first team and made her debut in the highest division in the 1956/57 season. She played nine championships with the Club Atletico.

She made her national team debut on 20 August 1959 against France. She competed at two editions of the European Championships (1962 and 1964).

She retired when she was only 25 years old and married shortly after. She died in Cesena, aged 79.
