= Mercedes Mendoza Suasti =

Ecuadorian singer (1927–2020)

Mercedes Mendoza Suasti (7 May 1927 – 17 May 2020) was an Ecuadorian singer. She was a member of the musical duo the Mendoza Suasti Sisters.
