= Richard Byerly =

American politician (1938–2020)

Member of the Iowa House of Representatives from the 61st district
- In office January 8, 1973 – January 9, 1983

Personal details
- Born: Richard L. Byerly; July 18, 1938 Boone, Iowa, U.S.
- Died: May 23, 2020 (aged 81)
- Party: Democratic
- Spouse: Elna Reedholm (m. 1959)
- Children: 5
- Education: Simpson College (BA); Iowa State University (MS, PhD)
- Occupation: Politician, educator

Richard L. Byerly (July 18, 1938 – May 23, 2020) was an American politician and educator.

== Background ==
Byerly was born in Boone, Iowa, and graduated from Boone High School in 1955. He graduated from Boone Junior College in 1958. He graduated from Simpson College in 1960. Byerly received his master's and doctorate degrees from Iowa State University from 1967 to 1970. Byerly worked in administration with the Des Moines Area Community College. He served in the Iowa House of Representatives from 1973 to 1983 and was a Democrat.
