= Clive Limpkin =

British photojournalist and writer (1937–2020)

- Born: 1937; United Kingdom
- Died: 13 May 2020 (aged 82–83); London, United Kingdom
- Occupation: Photojournalist

Clive Limpkin (1937 – 13 May 2020) was a British photojournalist and writer.

== Biography ==
Limpkin was born in 1937 in the United Kingdom. He worked as a photojournalist for The Sun in the 1960s and 1970s before joining the Daily Mail. He also worked as a freelance photographer for the Daily Express, The Sunday Times, and The Observer.

His photo of the Battle of the Bogside in Derry of Paddy Coyle holding a Molotov cocktail and wearing a gas mask became iconic. He became an editor at A La Carte magazine, and subsequently left the world of journalism to focus on photography and travel.

Clive Limpkin died at his home in London on 13 May 2020 at the age of 82 due to a brain tumor.

== Publications ==
- The Battle of Bogside (1972)
- India Exposed: The Subcontinent A-Z (2009)
- Lost in the Reptile House (2013)
- Talk to me America (2014)

== Exhibitions ==
- The Petrol Bomber (1994)
- Picturing Derry (2013)

== Prizes ==
- Robert Capa Gold Medal for the book The Battle of Bogside (1973)
- 1st prize in Single General Feature Photos of World Press Photo for "The photographer’s son in the garden" (1976)
