= Jean Le Dû =

Breton linguist (1938–2020)

- Born: 28 March 1938; Dieppe, France
- Died: 6 May 2020 (aged 82); Saint-Quay-Portrieux, France
- Occupation: Linguist

Jean Le Dû (28 March 1938 – 6 May 2020) was a French linguist of the Breton language.

== Biography ==
For fifty years, Le Dû collected documents on the Breton language in Plougrescant. In 2012, he published a dictionary for Breton and French translations, titled Le trégorrois à Plougrescant. His discovery of the language came during his childhood in Dieppe.

Le Dû held a doctoral degree in phonetic English. He worked at the University of Rennes and taught courses in Breton, Irish, and other Celtic languages. He was a professor emeritus at the University of Western Brittany. Le Dû was the Director of Research Group 9 of the French National Centre for Scientific Research from 1988 to 1996.

Le Dû was a member of the French Communist Party. He was married to a professor of physics and chemistry, and had two daughters named Mai and Donaig.[10] He died on 6 May 2020 at the age of 82 in Saint-Quay-Portrieux.

== Works ==
- Dictionnaire pratique français-breton (1976)
- Ar brezoneg dre zelled, kleved, komz ha lenn (1993)
- Nouvel atlas linguistique de la Basse-Bretagne (2001)
- Proverbes et Dictions de Basse-Bretagne
- Anthologie des expressions de Basse-Bretagne (1999)
- Du café vous aurez? (2002)
- Une vie irlandaise du Connemara à Ráth Chairn, histoire de la vie de Micil Chonraí (2010)
- Le trégorrois à Plougrescant. Dictionnaire breton français (2012)
- Le trégorrois à Plougrescant. Dictionnaire français breton (2012)
