= Hussain Ahmad Kanjo =

Pakistani politician (1985–2020)

- حسین احمد کانجو

Provincial Minister for Science and Technology (Khyber Pakhtunkhwa)
- In office 2002–2007

Personal details
- Cause of death: COVID-19
- Profession: Politician

Hussain Ahmad Kanjo (Urdu: حسین احمد کانجو, 17 August 1985 – 24 May 2020) was a Pakistani politician and Khyber Pakhtunkhwa's former provisional minister for science and technology, archives and libraries (2002–2007).

He died of COVID-19 on 24 May 2020, during the COVID-19 pandemic in Pakistan at age 64.
