= Dolf Niezen =

Dutch footballer (1926–2020)

Personal information
- Date of birth: 14 February 1926
- Date of death: 1 May 2020 (aged 94)
- Position: Goalkeeper

Youth career
- ADO

Senior career*
Years	Team	Apps	(Gls)
1942–1949	ADO	97	(0)
1949–1951	Quick		
- * Club domestic league appearances and goals

Dolf Niezen (14 February 1926 – 1 May 2020) was a Dutch footballer who played as a goalkeeper.

== Career ==
Niezen joined ADO at the age of 9 and made his first-team debut at the age of 16. That season, in 1942 during World War II, the club became Dutch champion, making him the youngest goalkeeper to win the title. He made 97 league appearances for ADO between 1942 and 1949, before later playing for Quick.

== Later life and death ==
He died on 1 May 2020, aged 94.
