= Lloyd Criss =

American politician (1941–2020)

Member of the Texas House of Representatives
- In office January 9, 1979 – January 8, 1991
- Preceded by: Andrew Z. Baker
- Succeeded by: Mike Martin
- Constituency: 19th district (1979‍–‍1983); 25th district (1983‍–‍1991)

Personal details
- Born: Lloyd William Criss Jr. January 17, 1941 Galveston, Texas, US
- Died: May 10, 2020 (aged 79) Texas City, Texas, US
- Party: Democratic

Lloyd William Criss Jr. (January 17, 1941 – May 10, 2020) was an American politician who served in the Texas House of Representatives from 1979 to 1991.

Criss was born in Galveston, Texas. He moved with his family to Texas City, Texas. Criss was a plumber and pipefitter and was involved with the labor union. Criss served on the La Marque, Texas City Council. He died on May 10, 2020, in Texas City, Texas at age 79.

Texas House of Representatives
Preceded by Andrew Z. Baker	Member of the Texas House of Representatives; 1979‍–‍1991 from the 19th district (Galveston County), seat B, 1979‍–‍1983 from the 25th district (Galveston County), 1983‍–‍1991; Served alongside: E. Douglas McLeod until 1983	Succeeded by Mike Martin
