= Cristina Pezzoli =

Italian theatre director (1963–2020)

Cristina Pezzoli (July 2, 1963 – May 22, 2020) was an Italian theatre director.
