= Lia Schwartz =

Argentine-American historian (1941–2020)

Lia Schwartz (1941 – May 31, 2020) was an Argentine-American historian of Spanish and Comparative Literature.

== Biography ==
Lia Schwartz was born in Corrientes, Argentina, 1941.

She served as a Distinguished Professor at the Graduate Center of the City University of New York. Schwartz taught Spanish and Comparative Literature at Fordham University (1971-1990) and at Dartmouth College (1990-2000), and since 2000 is Distinguished Professor of Spanish and Comparative Literature at the Graduate Center of The City University of New York. She was Executive Officer of its Ph.D. Program in Hispanic and Luso-Brazilian Literatures and Languages (now Latin American, Iberian, and Latino Cultures)from 2000-2011).

Schwartz published numerous articles, reviews and review-articles on topics, genres and themes that were central in her main area of expertise, Renaissance and Baroque poetry and prose, which encompass love discourses, satire, Hispano-classical translations and relations, Italian influences on European literature, humanism and the transmission of Greek and Roman culture. They appeared in American and European scholarly journals and collective volumes. Her publications include, Metafora y satira en la obra de Quevedo (Madrid: Taurus, 1984); Quevedo: discurso y representación (Pamplona 1987); two annotated anthologies of Quevedo's poetry, co-authored with Ignacio Arellano, Quevedo. Poesia selecta (Barcelona: PPU, 1989) and Un Heráclito cristiano, Canta sola a Lisi y otros poemas (Barcelona: Crítica, 1998).

She was co-editor, with Antonio Carreira, of a collection of essays on Quevedo, Quevedo a nueva luz: escritura y política (Málaga, 1997). She is also the author of the critical and annotated edition of Quevedo's satire, La Fortuna con seso y la Hora de todos, based on the only extant manuscript now in the Hispanic Society of America (Madrid: Editorial Castalia, 2009), and also of a former edition published in the collection of the complete prose works of Quevedo (Madrid, 2003), based upon printed testimonies.

Schwartz edited the Festschrift, Studies in Honor of James O. Crosby (Newark, Del.: Juan de la Cuesta, 2004). In Málaga in 2005 also appeared her book, De Fray Luis a Quevedo. Lecturas de los clásicos antiguos. She belongs to the editorial board of many national and international journals; was twice elected to the board of AISO (Asociación Internacional Siglo de Oro); was Secretary General of the AIH (International Association of Hispanists) from 1992 to 1998, and President of the Association from 1998 to 2001.

Schwartz died in New York, on May 31, 2020.
