= Lewis Marquardt =

American politician (1936–2020)

Member of the South Dakota House of Representatives
- In office 1968–1970

Personal details
- Born: Lewis Raymond Marquardt; November 7, 1936 Jamestown, North Dakota, U.S.
- Died: May 31, 2020 (aged 83) Austin, Texas, U.S.
- Party: Democratic
- Education: Minot State University (BA); Arizona State University (PhD)

Military service
- Branch/service: United States Army
- Years of service: 1958–1961

Lewis Raymond Marquardt (November 7, 1936 – May 31, 2020) was an American politician and educator.

== Career ==
Marquardt served in the United States Army from 1958 to 1961, working as a Russian linguist stationed in Kassel, Germany. Marquardt lived with his wife and family in Webster, South Dakota, and taught at Webster High School. He served in the South Dakota House of Representatives from 1968 to 1970 as a Democrat. He then taught at the Arizona State University and the Texas State University San Marcos.

== Death ==
Marquardt died on May 31, 2020, in Austin, Texas.
