= Ben Hoekendijk =

Dutch speaker, evangelist, and pastor (1938–2020)

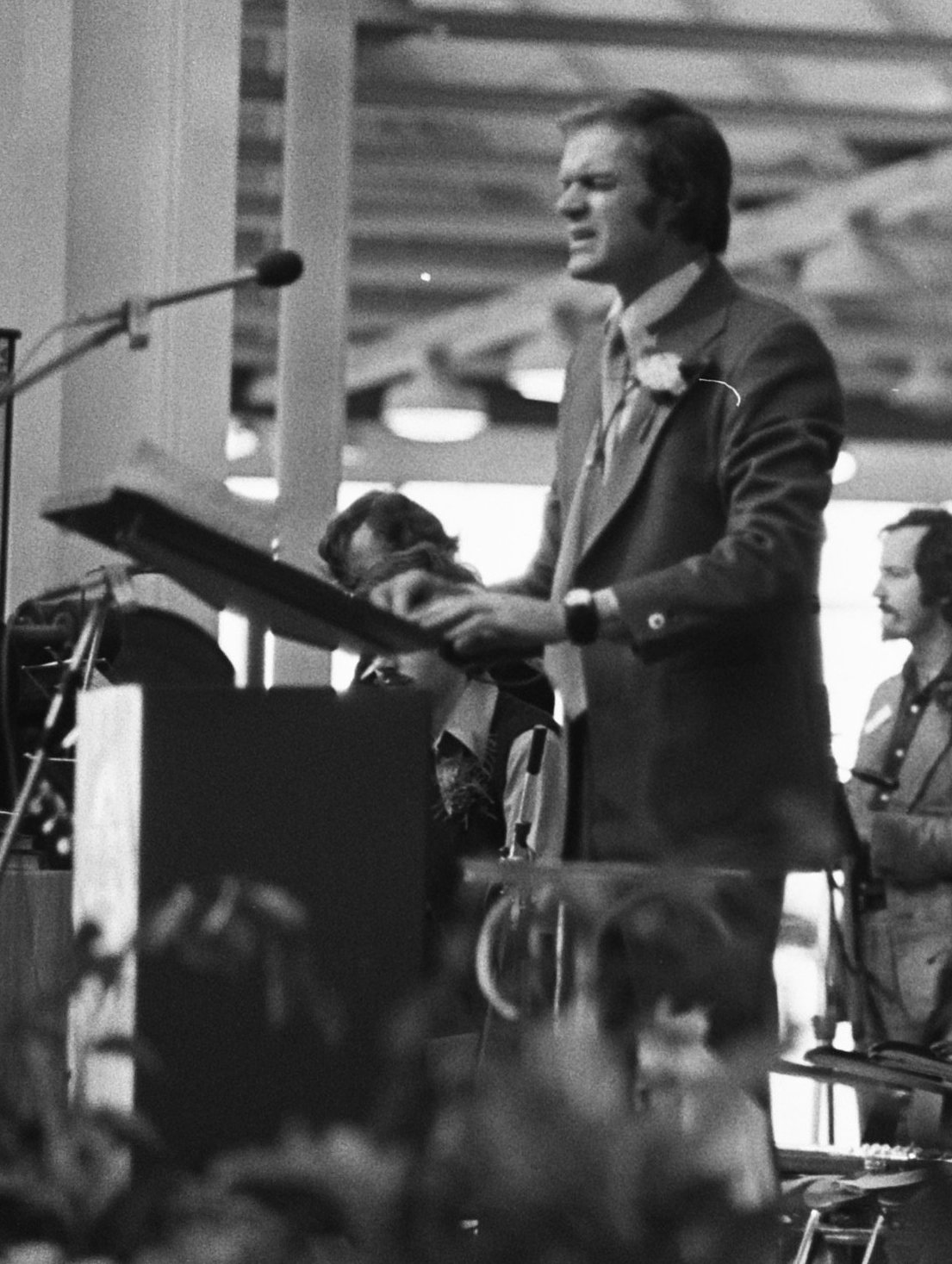
- Hoekendijk (1975)
- Born: 30 June 1938; Baarn
- Died: 1 May 2020 (aged 81); Harderwijk

Ben Hoekendijk (30 June 1938 – 1 May 2020) was a Dutch speaker, evangelist and pastor.

Hoekendijk was born in Baarn. He was the founder and director of the Opwekking Foundation which made him one of the faces of the Dutch Pentecostal movement. Later he became an active sailor and sports journalist.

Hoekendijk died in Harderwijk where he lived on 1 May 2020, aged 81.

== Biography ==
Hoekendijk was born as the fourth child of Karel Hoekendijk and Elisabeth Hoekendijk-La Rivière. He received a Christian education, but experienced the faith himself at a point in time. After the deepening of his parents' faith in 1953, his brother and both sisters soon came, and finally Hoekendijk himself crossed the bridge of faith. With his youth group, called "The Gideons", he traveled through the streets of Utrecht from 1956 to preach the gospel. Hoekendijk's father was the leader of the revival movement Stromen van Kracht. As a result, he almost naturally grew in the work of his father. In addition to serving as a youth leader and evangelist, he was an interpreter for many foreign guest speakers.

In 1957 Hoekendijk fulfilled alternative military service with the Postcheque- en Girodienst. Then he led a small stream of power church. As a local pastor he became involved in the Osborn campaign in 1958. In August 1959 Hoekendijk himself held his first tent campaign at the Janskerkhof in Utrecht. In the same year he married Wiesje Hijink and settled in Gelderland, Putten. They had three children. Ben Hoekendijk died in 2020 at the age of 81.

=== Opwekking ===
Hoekendijk started publishing the magazine Opwekking (in English, 'Revival') from 1960. Hoekendijk's foundation, which was originally called "Ben Hoekendijk Evangelization-Healing Campaigns", was also named Opwekking from 1974. Because of his growing fame as a tent evangelist, Hoekendijk was regularly asked to give speaking engagements throughout the Netherlands.

In 1971, Hoekendijk was the initiator behind the movement "Thou shalt not follow the majority in evil". The national media paid a lot of attention. In 1972, Opwekking started with so-called Pentecost conferences (usually referred to as Opwekking). Initially they attracted about 500 people, but now Opwekking has grown into an event with 50,000 visitors. Hoekendijk was one of the regular speakers until 1990.

From 1972 to 1979 Hoekendijk organized the One-Way-Days, events in the Utrecht Jaarbeurs that were visited at their peak by more than 10,000 young people. In 1974 he spoke at the charismatic World Conference in Jerusalem and in 1976 at Billy Graham's Eurofest in Brussels. Hoekendijk has also written a number of books over the years. The most famous are Seeking balance and Twelve Jews find the Messiah.

=== Sea sailing ===
The evangelist grew out of a well-known figure in the world of sea sailing, both because of his journalistic activities and the special trips he made with his yachts. These were successively named Shalom I t/m IV. He wrote eleven water sports books published by the nautical publisher Alk & Heijnen and translated six. He gave courses and lectures for water sports associations and companies.

From 1979, Hoekendijk made many long sailing trips over the North Sea, the Mediterranean Sea and for 13 months solo over the Atlantic Ocean to Spitsbergen. The publicity surrounding this trip, after heart surgery, earned him a nomination for the title Puttenaar of the year. Until an advanced age he accompanied prospective sailors. He has been awarded by the Dutch Association of Coastal Sailors and became an honorary member of the Lerwick Boating Club in the Shetland Islands. On April 29, 2011, Hoekendijk was knighted for his years of activities in the field of both evangelism and sailing.

== Books about sailing at sea ==
- Was het toeval of een glimlachje van de hemel?
- Zeekoorts
- De wereld volgens Reid
- De overtocht naar Engeland (pilot)
- De overtocht naar Zuid-Engeland (pilot)
- De overtocht naar Normandië en de Kanaaleilanden (pilot)
- Vrijheid en eenvoud
- De magie van de eilanden
- Vader en zoon naar Spitsbergen
- Vaargids IJsselmeer (pilot)
- Vaargids Waddenzee (pilot)

Furthermore, he translated:

- Het complete zeilhandboek
- Schaduw over de Wadden
- Reeds schippershandboek
- Het weer op zee
- Verfsystemen voor jachten
- Praktisch zeemanschap
