= Vormsi Enn =

Estonian esotericist (1943–2020)

Enn Mikker (alternatively referred to as Vormsi Enn; 5 August 1943 – 17 May 2020), was a prominent Estonian esoteric practitioner, sometimes introduced as a "witch" or a "miracle healer".
