= Anthony DiGiorgio =

American academic administrator (1940–2020)

- Born: Anthony Joseph DiGiorgio; 1940; Sharon, Pennsylvania
- Died: May 20, 2020 (aged 79); Tucson, Arizona
- Education: Purdue University; Gannon College
- Spouse: Gale N. DiGiorgio
- Children: 2

President of Winthrop University
- In office 1989–2013

Anthony Joseph DiGiorgio (1940 – May 20, 2020) was the ninth president of Winthrop University.

== Biography ==
DiGiorgio was born to an immigrant bricklayer in Sharon, Pennsylvania, in 1940. He received an undergraduate degree at Gannon College and later earned a master's and doctoral degree from Purdue University. In 1963, he began teaching English at Belleville High School in New Jersey. Three years later, he became a faculty member and assistant to the dean of humanities, social science and education at Purdue. From 1970 to 1989, he held various positions, including vice president of academic affairs at Trenton State College. In 1989, he was chosen as president of Winthrop University, a position he held until 2013. While at Winthrop, he served two terms on the board of directors of the National Collegiate Athletic Association. He remained a part of Winthrop's faculty before retiring in 2017.

DiGiorgio was married to his wife Gale, and they had two daughters, Darrah and Dina, the latter of whom died in 2007. In March 2020, DiGiorgio was diagnosed with esophageal cancer. He was undergoing treatment for it, when he died of a pulmonary embolism at age 79 on May 20, 2020, in Tucson, Arizona.
