= Xavier Grau i Masip =

Spanish painter (1951–2020)

Xavier Grau i Masip (1951 – 30 May 2020) was a Spanish painter.
