= James R. Redmond =

American zoologist (1928–2020)

James R. Redmond (July 14, 1928 − May 11, 2020) was Emeritus Professor of Zoology in the Iowa State University department of Ecology, Evolution and Organismal Biology.

He received his B.S., 1949, Cincinnati; Ph.D., 1954, California (Los Angeles), and is known for his research with Nautilus; he was a researcher at McMurdo Station. He was the author of the chapter on Respiratory Biology in Nautilus: The Biology and Paleobiology of a Living Fossil / He also wrote Comparative crystallography of vertebrate otoconia Transport of Oxygen by the Blood of the Land Crab, Gecarcinus lateralis The respiratory function of hemocyanin in crustacea
