= April–June 2020 in science =

This article lists a number of significant events in science that have occurred in the second quarter of 2020.

== Events ==
=== April ===
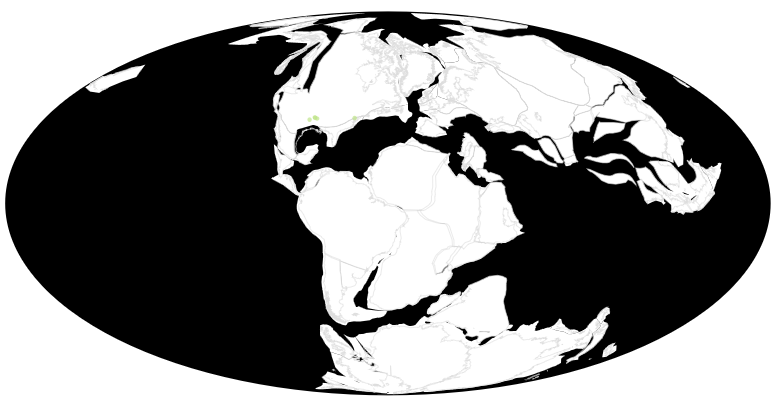
1 April: Researchers report to have discovered evidence that rainforests existed near the South Pole ca. 90 million years ago during the Cretaceous period, suggesting that the climate was exceptionally warm at the time. The Image shows Earth ca. 120 Ma.

- 1 April
  - A scientific review finds that substantial recovery for most components of marine ecosystems within two to three decades can be achieved if climate change is addressed adequately and efficient interventions are deployed at large scale. It documents the recovery of marine populations, habitats and ecosystems following past conservation interventions, identifies nine components integral to conservation and recovery and recommend actions along with opportunities, benefits, possible roadblocks and remedial actions. The researchers caution about a narrow window of opportunity in which decisions can choose between "a legacy of a resilient and vibrant ocean or an irreversibly disrupted ocean". They assess the goal 14 of the Sustainable Development Goals of the United Nations to be a "doable Grand Challenge for humanity, an ethical obligation and a smart economic objective to achieve a sustainable future".
  - Researchers report to have discovered and analysed fossil roots embedded in a mudstone matrix containing diverse pollen and spores which indicate that rainforests existed near the South Pole ca. 90 million years ago during the Cretaceous period. Their findings suggest that the climate was exceptionally warm at the time and that the carbon dioxide levels in the atmosphere were substantially higher than expected during the mid-Cretaceous period, 115-80 million years ago.
  - Researchers report that stretching cells alone can activate genes without intermediates, enzymes or signaling molecules in the cell being necessary. They applied cyclic forces of frequencies which cells experience due to common activities such as breathing, exercising or vocalizing and found that the induced transcription up-regulation does not follow the weak power law with force frequency. They also describe why some genes can be activated by mechanical force and some cannot.
  - Scientists report that for the first time they have retrieved genetic information from the fossils of H. antecessor as old as 772,000–949,000 years and Homo erectus as old as 1.77 million years via dental enamel proteomes . They show that H. antecessor is a closely related sister-lineage to subsequent Middle and Late Pleistocene hominins, including modern humans, Neanderthals and Denisovans.
- 2 April
  - Researchers at the University of Pittsburgh School of Medicine report the creation of a promising possible COVID-19 vaccine, named PittCoVacc, against SARS-CoV-2, the virus that causes COVID-19, and are hoping for a fast approval track, lasting less than the usual year of testing, by the U.S. Food and Drug Administration.
  - Researchers at the University of British Columbia report the discovery of a trial drug that can substantially block early stages of COVID-19 in engineered human tissues.
  - Scientists report the discovery of the oldest known fossils, dated to as old as 2.04 million years old, of Homo erectus in the palaeocave Drimolen in South Africa, which may have overlapped, in the same area and time, as other hominins, such as Australopithecus and Paranthropus.
  - Scientists report finding large communities of microbes living under the seafloor in solid rocks determined to be up to 104 million years old. According to the study the results may have implications for the possibility of life on Mars and other planetary bodies due to potentially similar conditions and rocks or minerals.
  - Astronomers report further evidence of the possible fragmentation of the interstellar comet 2I/Borisov. A follow-up study, reported on 6 April 2020, observed only a single object, and noted that the fragment component had now disappeared.
- 6 April
  - Astronomers announce, on "The Astronomer's Telegram", the possible disintegration of Comet C/2019 Y4 (ATLAS).
  - Scientists report the discovery of metabolic genes in the genomes of 501 widespread Nucleocytoviricota even though viruses don't have metabolism. Some of their findings suggest that these large viruses can reprogram fundamental aspects of their host's carbon metabolism and that they are drivers of evolutionary innovation in metabolic genes.
  - Scientists using data from the Copernicus Sentinel-5P satellite report a "mini-hole" in the ozone layer over the Arctic, likely caused by unusual atmospheric conditions, including freezing temperatures in the stratosphere.
  - Researchers report that they have discovered and filmed one the longest organisms known so far with the SuBastian underwater robot in the Ningaloo Canyons off the coast of Western Australia: a siphonophore of the genus Apolemia with an estimated length of almost 50 meters which coiled itself into a spiral form. Specimens of lion's mane jellyfish are known to be larger. They also discovered up to 30 new underwater species and collected DNA samples and specimens of various deep sea creatures.
- 7 April
  - Scientists report the results of a survey of the Great Barrier Reef. For the first time, all its three regions experienced severe bleaching. On March 25 – day three of the nine-day survey – they reported its third mass bleaching event within five years.
  - Astronomers publish a study which includes the first photograph of a relativistic jet from an ongoing galaxy merger. The young jet from one of the two galaxies active galactic nuclei with a direction pointed near Earth and proves that such merge events can trigger such jets.
  - Astronomers publish a study which includes the highest resolution images of the Sun from NASA's FOXSI Sounding Rocket. The images show coronal loops – magnetic threads filled with million-degree hot plasma – of narrower widths than the ones previously seen.
- 8 April
  - In two research papers scientists show that microbes can actively colonize high-pH environments of radioactive waste storage sites. Their findings have implications for the safety, design and operation of such sites and the knowledge about extremophile microbial life.
  - Scientists publish a study which suggests that the Universe is no longer expanding at the same rate in all directions and that therefore the widely accepted isotropy hypothesis might be wrong. While previous studies already suggested this, the study is the first to examine galaxy clusters in X-rays and, according to Norbert Schartel, has a much greater significance. The study found a consistent and strong directional behavior of deviations – which have earlier been described to indicate a "crisis of cosmology" by others – of the normalization parameter A, or the Hubble constant H0. Beyond the potential cosmological implications, it shows that studies which assume perfect isotropy in the properties of galaxy clusters and their scaling relations can produce strongly biased results.
- 9 April
  - Scientists report direct evidence of the use of fiber technology by Neanderthals in southeastern France, 50,000 years ago.
  - Astronomers report the first direct measurement of winds on a brown dwarf (2MASS J10475385+2124234).
  - In a preprint to be published by a journal online in April and in its issue in May 2020 scientists show the glycan structures which coat SARS-CoV-2's spike protein. With these coatings the virus disguises itself to enter human cells. Their study may have implications in viral pathobiology and vaccine design and shows that the protein's coating is relatively weak and that the spike protein may be relatively vulnerable to antibodies.
  - Scientists report fossil evidence which suggests an extinct parapithecid rafted across the Atlantic in the Paleogene and at least briefly colonized South America next to the African-origin mammals New World monkeys and caviomorph rodents. The Ucayalipithecus perdita remains dating from the Early Oligocene of Amazonian Peru are deeply nested within the Parapithecidae, and have dental features markedly different from those of platyrrhines. Qatrania wingi of lower Oligocene Fayum deposits is considered the closest known relative of Ucayalipithecus. Models of winds and ocean currents indicate that such crossings would have taken only 11–15 days at the time. The absence of later finds from this group in South America indicates they were outcompeted by platyrrhines, which descend from a parallel anthropoid colonization of South America.
  - Scientists report the discovery of six novel coronaviruses, and one known alphacoronavirus previously identified in other southeast Asian countries were detected for the first time in bats in Myanmar where ongoing land use change is a prominent driver of zoonotic disease emergence. Future studies have been said to evaluate the potential for transmission across species. The study was conducted as part of the United States' PREDICT program which was ended by March 2020 by the nation's Trump administration but extended on 1 April 2020 due to the COVID-19 pandemic.
- 10 April
  - Medical scientists report the possible reinfection of COVID-19 patients who have recovered from COVID-19. Experts note that false test results or "reactivation" of the virus could also have caused these results. In May 2020 the Korea Centers for Disease Control and Prevention reported that patients who tested positive a second time were not infectious, were immune to the disease, showed symptoms and likely test positive again due to dead fragments of the virus.
  - Researchers show that a new type of X-ray detector, based on a thin film of the low-cost semiconductor mineral perovskite, is 100 times more sensitive than a conventional silicon-based device. The technology could reduce unhealthy radiation exposure and improve the resolution and applications of security scanners and research tools.
  - Scientists report to have achieved wireless control of adrenal hormone secretion in genetically unmodified rats through the use of injectable, magnetic nanoparticles (MNPs) and remotely applied alternating magnetic fields heats them up. Their findings may aid research of physiological and psychological impacts of stress and related treatments and present an alternative strategy for modulating peripheral organ function than problematic implantable devices.

13 April: Astronomers suggest the first comprehensive possible natural way that ʻOumuamua, the first known interstellar object detected passing through the Solar System, may have been formed.

- 13 April
  - Astronomers suggest the first comprehensive possible natural way that ʻOumuamua, the first known interstellar object detected passing through the Solar System, may have been formed. It may have been produced through extensive tidal fragmentation and ejected during close encounters of their parent bodies with their host star or stars.
  - Astronomers report to have recorded the most energetic supernova so far: SN 2016aps. The supernova also caused an unusually large amount of the energy to be released in the form of radiation, probably due to the interaction of the supernova ejecta and a previously lost gas shell. The scientists believe that the supernova could be an example of a pair-instability supernova or a pulsational pair-instability supernova, possibly formed from two massive stars that merged before the explosion. The event was discovered on 22 February 2016 by the Panoramic Survey Telescope and Rapid Response System (Pan-STARRS) in Hawaii, with follow-up observations by the Hubble Space Telescope.
  - A study which included aircraft measurements of methane emissions from offshore oil and gas platforms collected over the U.S. Gulf of Mexico in January 2018 indicates that the United States via the Environmental Protection Agency Greenhouse Gas Inventory (GHGI) underestimated methane emissions at the time from these sites by a factor of 2. They attribute the discrepancy between regional airborne estimates and their data as well as their estimations for total methane emissions from these sites and the GHGI estimations adjusted for 2018 to incomplete platform counts and emission factors that underestimate emissions for shallow water platforms and don't account for disproportionately high emissions from large shallow water facilities.
- 14 April
  - News outlets report that U.S. State Department cables indicate that, although there may be no conclusive proof at the moment, the COVID-19 virus responsible for the COVID-19 pandemic may, possibly, have accidentally come from a Wuhan (China) laboratory, studying bat coronaviruses that included modifying virus genomes to enter human cells, and determined to be unsafe by U.S. scientists in 2018, rather than from a natural source. US intelligence and national security officials say that the U.S. government is looking into the possibility. As of 18 May 2020, an official UN investigation into the origins of the COVID-19 virus, supported by over 120 countries, was being considered. As of 5 May, assessments and internal sources from the Five Eyes nations indicated that the COVID-19 pandemic being the result of a laboratory accident was "highly unlikely", since the human infection was "highly likely" a result of natural human and animal interaction. Virologist Peter Daszak states that an estimated 1–7 million people in Southeast Asia who live or work in proximity to bats are infected each year with bat coronaviruses.
  - A new study shows that the duration of anoxia approximately 444 million years ago was longer than 3 million years and affirms that the prolonged lack of oxygen in the oceans contributed to the Ordovician–Silurian mass extinction events at the time.
  - Researchers report to have developed a predictive algorithm which can show in visualizations how combinations of genetic mutations can make proteins highly effective or ineffective in organisms – including for viral evolution for viruses like SARS-CoV-2.
  - Stephen Wolfram announces the launch of the "Wolfram Physics Project" which seeks to collaboratively develop a new approach to the theory of everything by modelling physics based on minimal rules out of which complexities of physics may emerge.

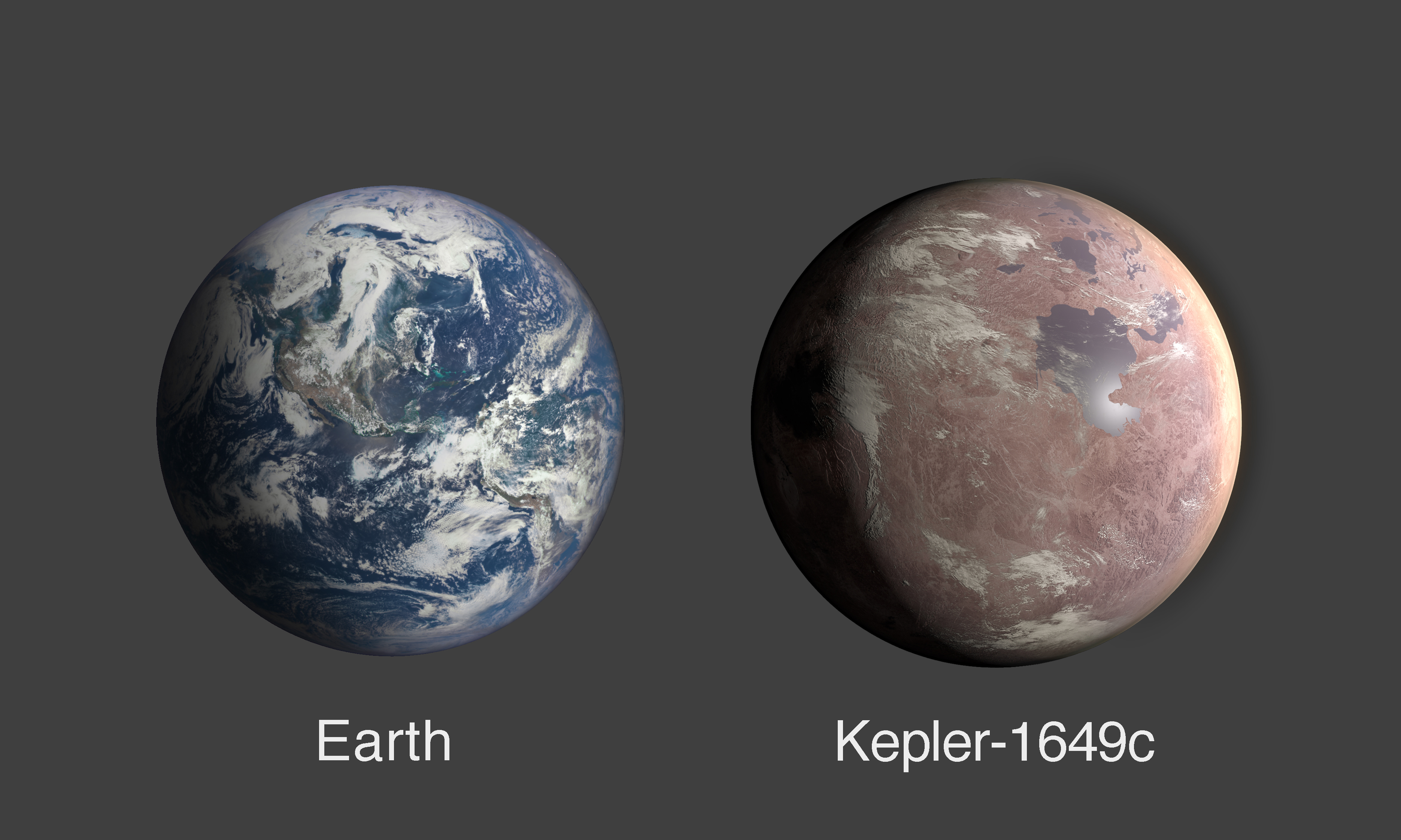
15 April: Kepler-1649c, the most Earth-like planet yet found in data from the Kepler space telescope.

- 15 April
  - NASA reports the discovery of Kepler-1649c, an exoplanet that, according to Jeff Coughlin, the director of SETI's K2 Science Office, is closer to Earth in size and likely temperature than any other world yet found in data from the Kepler Space Telescope. The planet was originally deemed a false positive by Kepler's robovetter algorithm, highlighting the value of human inspection of planet candidates even as automated techniques improve.
  - Researchers demonstrate a proof-of-concept silicon quantum processor unit cell which works at 1.5 Kelvin – many times warmer than common quantum processors that are being developed. It may enable integrating classical control electronics with the qubit array and reduce costs substantially. The cooling requirements necessary for quantum computing have been called one of the toughest roadblocks in the field.
  - Scientists report that the Greenland ice sheet lost around 600 billion tonnes of water in 2019, which would raise sea levels by about 1.5 millimetres and make up ca. 40% of the year's total sea level rise. The runoff ranked second only after the exceptional year 2012. The study affirms the exceptional nature of the 2019 season and shows that high-pressure atmospheric conditions over Greenland due to changing atmospheric circulation patterns – which have become more frequent due to climate change – were a cause of the melting next to the warmer temperatures. This suggests that scientists may be underestimating the melting of Greenland's ice – likely by a factor of two according to co-author Xavier Fettweis.
  - Scientists describe and visualize the atomical structure and mechanical action of the bacteria-killing bacteriocin R2 pyocin and construct engineered versions with different behaviours than the naturally occurring version. Their findings may aid the engineering of nanomachines such as for targeted antibiotics.
  - Scientists claim to have developed a biodegradable material for face masks which is effective at removing particles smaller than 100 nanometres including viruses and has a high breathability. A number of novel face masks and face mask technologies are being researched and developed as of May 2020.

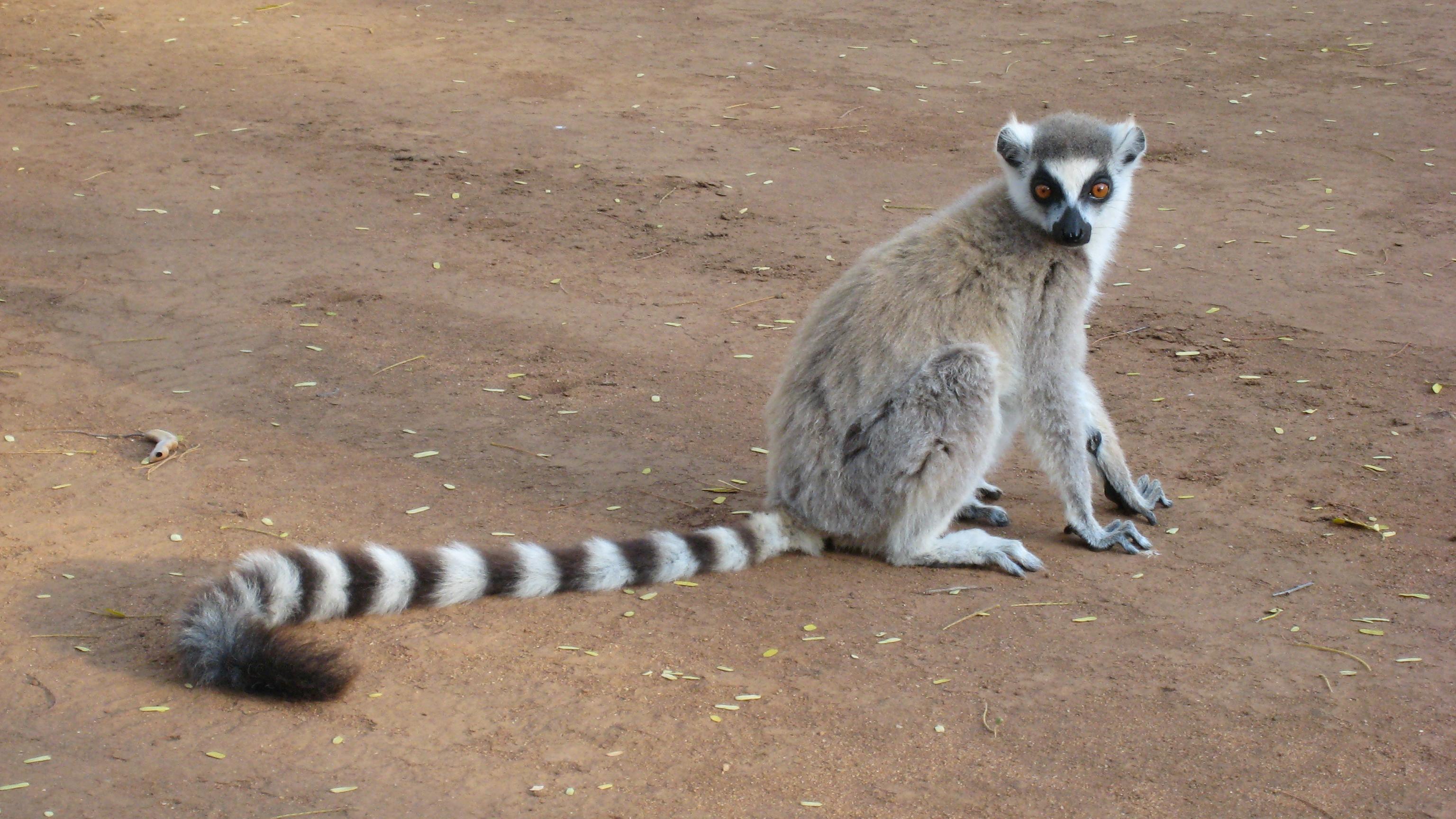
16 April: Scientists report that during their breeding season male ring-tailed lemurs exude three pheromones during breeding season in a testosterone-dependent manner.

- 16 April
  - Australia's Morrison government announces the launch of the research and development phase of its Reef Restoration and Adaptation Program after a two-year feasibility study. The selected 43 strategies of the program include climate engineering concepts such as brightening clouds with salt crystals, technologies to increase survival rate of coral larvae, coral seeding strategies and methods to facilitate faster recovery of coral reefs. The Australian Marine Conservation Society welcomed the work but remarked that policies which address global warming – the main cause of increasingly severe and frequent mass coral bleaching events – should be prioritised, that the projects could take years or decades to develop and that solutions to climate change – such as renewable energies – are already available.
  - Scientists prove the existence of the Rashba effect in bulk perovskites. Previously researchers have hypothesized that the materials' extraordinary electronic, magnetic and optical properties – which make it a commonly used material for solar cells and quantum electronics – are related to this effect which to date hasn't been proven to be present in the material.
  - Scientists report that during their breeding season male ring-tailed lemurs exude three compounds at higher levels in their wrist glandular odor. The study suggests that these may be pheromones which are involved in the attractiveness of the males to females as the females seem to be attracted to the smell during their breeding season. The amounts of dodecanal, 12-methyltridecanal, and tetradecanal increase in a testosterone-dependent manner.

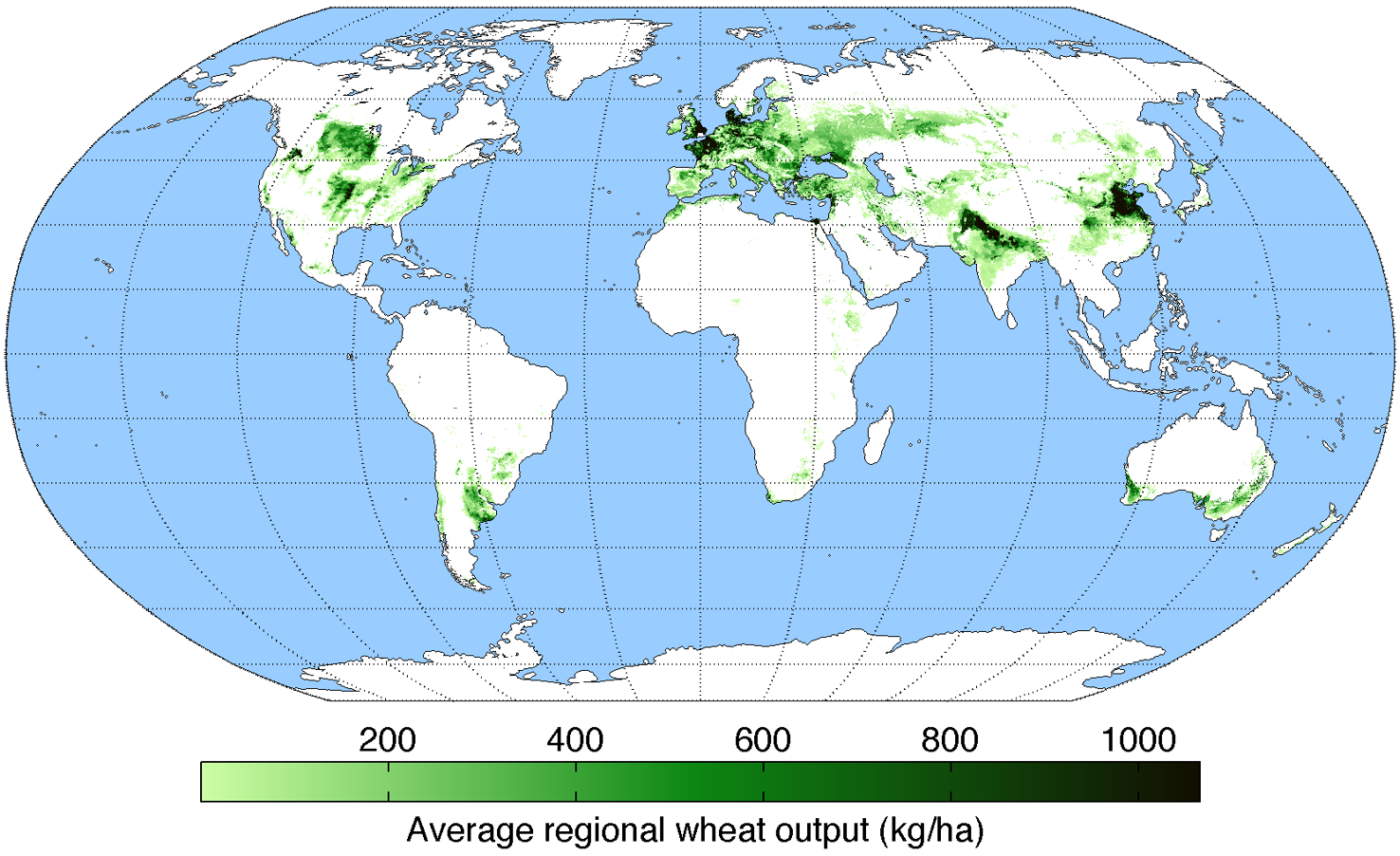
17 April: A study indicates that local food crop production alone cannot meet the demand for most food crops' "current production and consumption patterns" and the current locations of food production for 72–89% of the global population and 100–km radiuses as of early 2020. The image shows a map of global wheat production.

- 17 April
  - Researchers report that the 2000–2018 Southwestern North American drought was the second driest 19-year period since 800 CE, exceeded only by a late-1500s megadrought and that anthropogenic trends in temperature, relative humidity, and precipitation estimated from 31 climate models account for approximately 47% of the 2000–2018 drought severity.
  - A study indicates that local food crop production alone cannot meet the demand for most food crops "current production and consumption patterns" – which include the share of meat in local diets – and the current locations of food production for 72–89% of the global population and 100–km radiuses as of early 2020. While local production may be more sustainable and decrease risks of disrupted global food supply chains due to crises like the COVID-19 pandemic it cannot be relied on solely.
  - Researchers report to have traced the origins of shark fins of endangered hammerhead sharks from a retail market in Hong Kong back to their source populations and therefore the approximate locations where the sharks were first caught using DNA analysis.
- 19 April
  - Researchers report that the Arctic Ocean will likely be occasionally sea-ice free in summers before 2050 in scenarios where global warming is kept below 2 °C.
- 20 April
  - Researchers report a new approach to fabricate metallic polymers with atomic precision.
  - In a preprint researchers report a method to quickly identify different variants of SARS-CoV-2 using "Informative Subtype Markers"-labels, which may allow tracking the emergence of subtypes in different regions over time and aid tools to help enhance containment, therapeutic, and vaccine targeting strategies.
  - Scientists report that the coma of interstellar comet 2I/Borisov contains more than three times more carbon monoxide gas than water vapor than previously measured for any comet in the inner (<2.5 au) Solar System. In two studies they publish data collected via the Hubble Space Telescope which, according to the authors, provide a "first glimpse into the ice content and chemical composition of the protoplanetary disk of another star that is substantially different from our own" and likely formed in a CO-rich environment of the cold, outer regions of a distant protoplanetary accretion disk.
  - Researchers demonstrate a method to direct self-assembly – in terms of size, position and geometry – of a multitude of materials made out of components of more than four orders of magnitude different in size and mass using femtosecond laser pulses.
  - Researchers demonstrate a diffusive memristor fabricated from protein nanowires of the bacterium Geobacter sulfurreducens which functions at substantially lower voltages than previously described ones and may allow the construction of artificial neurons which function at voltages of biological action potentials. The nanowires have a range of advantages over silicon nanowires and the memristors may be used to directly process biosensing signals, for neuromorphic computing and/or direct communication with biological neurons.
  - Researchers report that Eurasian ice sheet collapse was a major source meltwater pulse 1A sea level rise 14,600 years ago, causing up to half of the ca. 16 meter rise.
  - Researchers report that by the end of the 21st century people could be exposed to avoidable indoor CO_{2} levels of up to 1400 ppm, which would be triple the amount commonly experienced outdoors today and, according to the authors, may cut humans' basic decision-making ability by ~25% and complex strategic thinking by ~50%.
  - Scientists report the development of perovskite electrochemical cells which can efficiently convert electricity and water into hydrogen and back.
  - An unusual plant collected by a team of botanists in early 2010 while exploring the remote deserts of Karas, Namibia was found to represent not only a new genus, but a completely new family. Tiganophytaceae is described as the newest member of the order Brassicales, and is the newest botanical family to be described since Kewaceae in 2014.
- 22 April
  - Microplastic pollution is recorded in Antarctic sea ice for the first time.
  - After studying the 2018 Kīlauea volcano eruption researchers report that extreme rainfall can modulate volcanic activity.
  - Scientists report ferroelectricity in a material structure with functional features down to a thickness of one nanometre, making it a candidate for powering very small devices and for other electronics.
  - Researchers report that a mass DNA analysis of over 27,000 Icelanders shows that the Neanderthal population that mixed with modern Icelanders was more similar to a Neanderthal found in Croatia than to Neanderthals found in Russia, that Icelanders carry more traces of Denisovan DNA than expected, that on average these Neanderthal children had older mothers and younger fathers compared to modern humans and that Neanderthal DNA has a relatively minor effect on human health and appearance today.
  - A study using satellite data shows that oil and gas operations in the United States' Permian Basin are releasing the greenhouse gas methane at twice the average rate found in earlier studies of 11 other major oil and gas regions of the United States. According to the authors insufficient infrastructure to process and transport natural gas may be one cause of the high rate.
- 23 April
  - NASA reports building, in 37 days, a successful COVID-19 ventilator (named VITAL ("Ventilator Intervention Technology Accessible Locally")) which is currently undergoing further testing. NASA is seeking fast-track approval by the United States Food and Drug Administration (FDA). On 30 April, NASA reports receiving FDA approval for emergency use of the new ventilator. On 29 May, NASA reports that eight manufacturers were selected to manufacture the new ventilator.
  - Researchers report that top gamers shared the same mental toughness as olympian athletes.
- 24 April
  - Researchers report discovering nitrogen-bearing organics in Allan Hills 84001, a Martian meteorite found on Earth.
  - Researchers report to have developed an inexpensive, small smartphone-based testing device which can detect pathogens such as SARS-CoV-2 within 30 minutes.
  - Researchers report that gaps due to an improper fit of a face mask can decrease the filtration efficiency by over 60% and that filtration efficiencies of hybrid homemade face mask such as cotton–chiffon are larger than single-layer homemade masks – over 80% for particles <300 nm.
  - Scientists report verifying measurements 2011-2014 via ULAS J1120+0641 of what seem to be a spatial variation in four measurements of the fine-structure constant, a basic physical constant used to measure electromagnetism between charged particles, which indicates that there might be directionality with varying natural constants in the Universe which would have implications for theories on the emergence of habitability of the Universe and be at odds with the widely accepted theory of constant natural laws and the standard model of cosmology which is based on an isotropic Universe.
  - Scientists report to be able to identify the genomic pathogen signature of all 29 different SARS-CoV-2 RNA sequences available to them using machine learning and a dataset of 5000 unique viral genomic sequences. They suggest that their approach can be used as a reliable real-time option for taxonomic classification of novel pathogens.

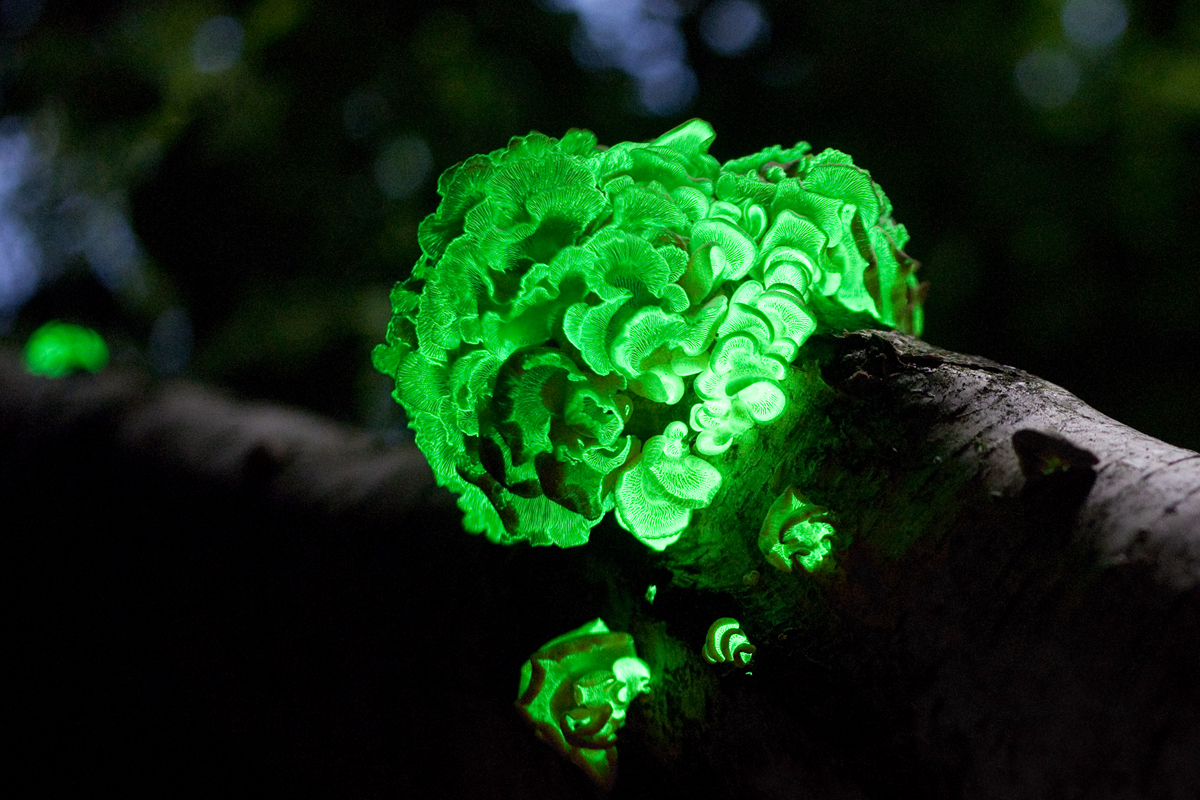
27 April: Scientists report to have genetically engineered plants to glow much brighter than previously possible by inserting genes of the bioluminescent mushroom Neonothopanus nambi. The image shows the mushroom Panellus Stipticus displaying bioluminescence

- 27 April
  - Scientists report to have genetically engineered plants to glow much brighter than previously possible by inserting genes of the bioluminescent mushroom Neonothopanus nambi. The glow is self-sustained, works by converting plants' caffeic acid into luciferin and, unlike for bacterial bioluminescence genes used earlier, has a high light output that is visible to the naked eye.
  - Scientists report that collectives of bacteria have a membrane potential-based form of collective working memory. When they shone light onto a biofilm of bacteria optical imprints lasted for hours after the initial stimulus as the light-exposed cells responded differently to oscillations in membrane potentials due to changes to their potassium channels. A form of collective memory in bacteria has reportedly been demonstrated experimentally first in 2016.

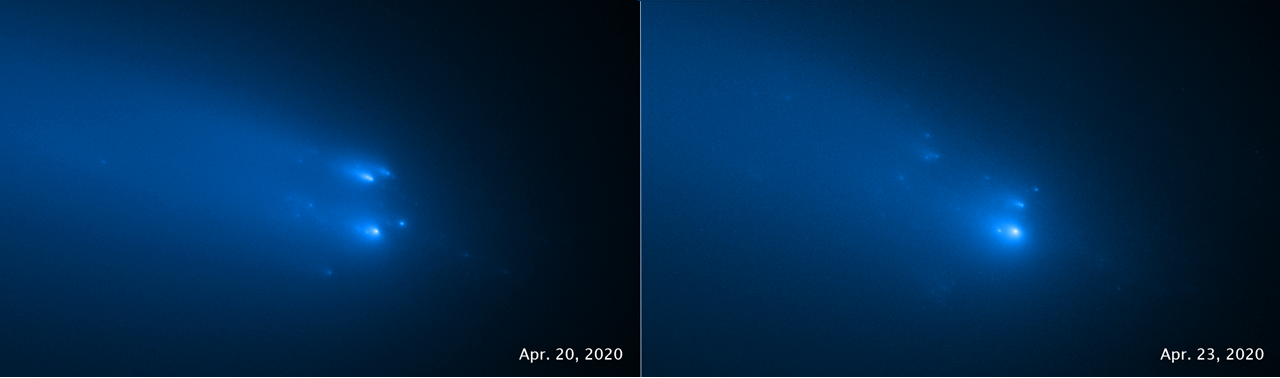
28 April: astronomers publish images by the Hubble Space Telescope of comet C/2019 Y4 (ATLAS) disintegrating into more than 30 fragments, causing it to dim.

- 28 April
  - Astronomers describe a way of detecting exoplanetary life via oxygen on water worlds.
  - Astronomers report the observation of a fast radio burst from the magnetar SGR 1935+2154, the first ever detected inside the Milky Way, and the first to be linked to a known source.
  - Researchers publish an analysis of the growth of confirmed infected COVID-19 cases in 9 countries which characterizes the spread and identifies effective flatten the curve-strategies.
  - Astronomers publish images by the Hubble Space Telescope of comet C/2019 Y4 (ATLAS) disintegrating into more than 30 fragments, causing it to dim. Previously, astronomers believed the comet might become one of the brightest comets near Earth in the last two decades and may become visible to the naked eye.

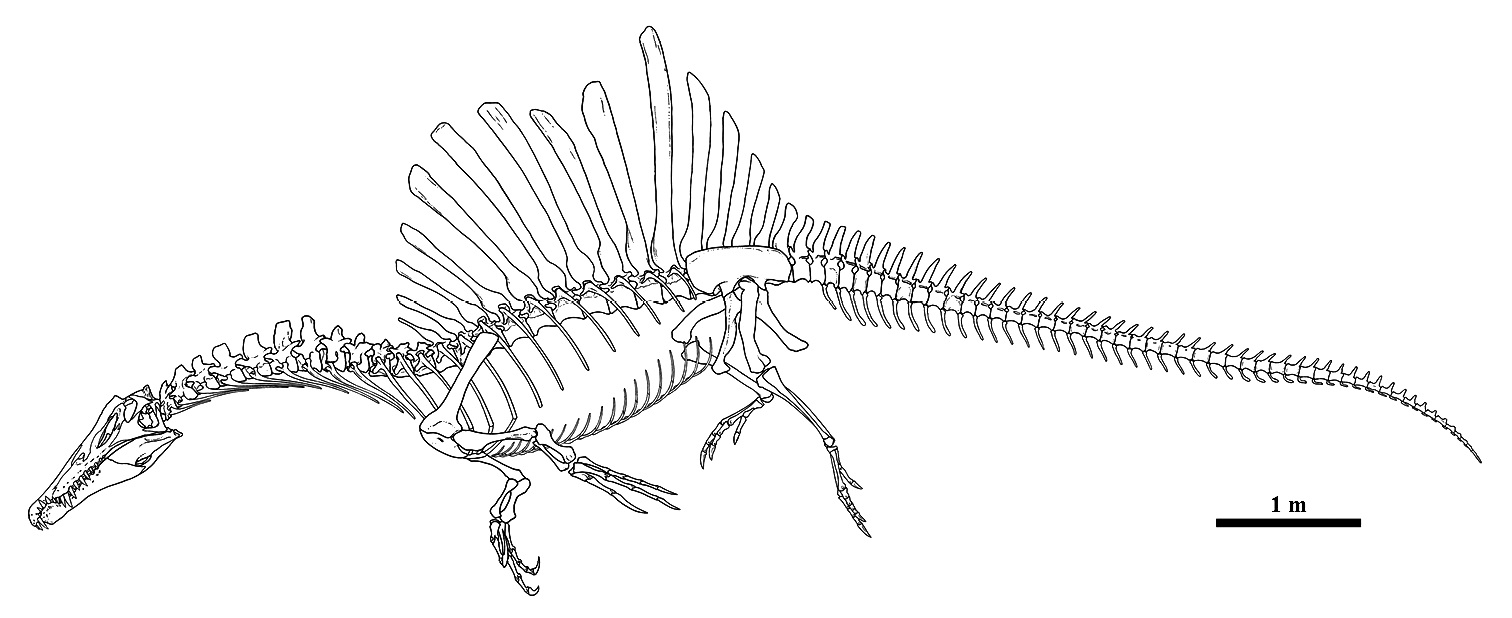
29 April: a new study of Spinosaurus aegyptiacus claims to have found the first unambiguous evidence for an aquatic propulsive structure in a non-avian dinosaur. The image shows S. aegyptiacus skeletal reconstruction in swimming posture prior to the discovery of the tail fin

- 29 April – A new study of Spinosaurus aegyptiacus, published in the journal Nature, claims to have found the first unambiguous evidence for an aquatic propulsive structure in a non-avian dinosaur and that the dinosaur had very tall, slender neural spines on its tail and hence a deep, laterally compressed tail like that of a gigantic newt.
- 30 April
  - The first results from ice-monitoring satellite ICESat-2 are published, showing that melting in Antarctica and Greenland has contributed 14 mm (0.55 in) of global sea level rise since 2003.
  - NASA selects three U.S. companies – Blue Origin, Dynetics, and SpaceX – to design and develop human landing systems (HLS) for the agency's Artemis program, one of which is planned to deliver the first woman and next man on the Moon in 2028.
  - Scientists report that one of the climate models – the CMIP6 model CESM2 – is not supported by paleoclimate records. Comparing simulations of this model with geological evidence suggests that its climate sensitivity is too high. This indicates that this model may not perform realistically at high CO_{2} concentrations, overestimating global warming at high levels of CO_{2} where its equilibrium climate sensitivity is 5.3 °C and modelled tropical land temperature exceeds 55 °C. They recommend using paleoclimate constraints of past warm and cold climates to benchmark the performance of CMIP6 climate models.
  - Astronomers publish 15 images of proto-planetary disks believed to undergo planet formation.

=== May ===
- 1 May – Scientists report that DNA damage and faulty DNA repair jointly cause mutations such as in cancer genomes.
- 2 May – A brown bear sighting in Spain's Invernadeiro national park is reported for the first time in 150 years.
- 4 May – Researchers project that regions inhabited by a third of the human population could become as hot as the hottest parts of the Sahara within 50 years without a change in patterns of population growth and without migration, unless greenhouse gas emissions are reduced. The projected annual average temperature of above 29 °C for these regions would be outside the "human temperature niche" and the most affected regions have little adaptive capacity as of 2020.

5 May: Researchers report that the North Magnetic Pole (pictured) is moving towards Siberia due to flux lobe elongation on Earth's core-mantle boundary.

- 5 May
  - A maiden flight of China's most powerful rocket to date, the Long March 5B, occurs.
  - Researchers report that the North Magnetic Pole is moving due to elongation of one of two lobes of negative magnetic flux on Earth's core-mantle boundary alongside magnetic changes and that it will likely move 390–660 km further on its current trajectory, on which it is accelerating, towards Siberia over the next decade.
- 6 May
  - Astronomers report the possible discovery of the nearest black hole to Earth, about 1,000 light years away in the two-star HR 6819 system.
  - A scientist's proposal for a solar-powered orbital slingshot rendezvous mission to investigate interstellar object ʻOumuamua is reported to have been selected for the NASA Innovative Advanced Concepts Program.

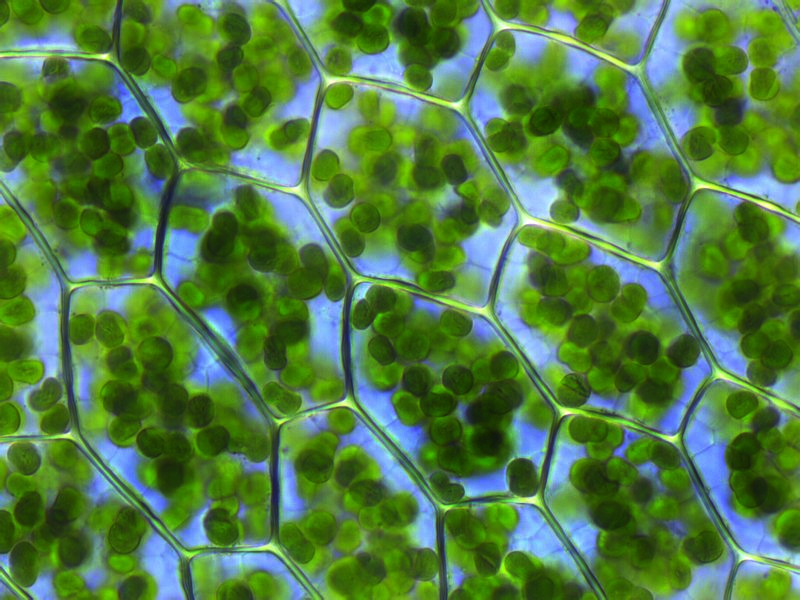
8 May: Researchers report the development of artificial chloroplasts. The image shows natural chloroplasts in plant cells.

- 8 May
  - Researchers show that wet-bulb temperatures (TW) above the upper physiological limit of humans have already occurred in some coastal subtropical locations despite climate models projecting such to occur only by the mid-21st century. These combinations of humidity and heat above a TW of 35 °C are likely to be fatal even to fit and healthy people when exposure is sustained and have more than doubled in frequency since 1979 overall, weather station data shows.
  - Researchers report to have developed artificial chloroplasts – the photosynthetic structures inside plant cells. They combined thylakoids, which are used for photosynthesis, from spinach with a bacterial enzyme and an artificial metabolic module of 16 enzymes, which can convert carbon dioxide more efficiently than plants can alone, into cell-sized droplets. According to the study this demonstrates how natural and synthetic biological modules can be matched for new functional systems.
  - Researchers report to have developed a proof-of-concept of a quantum radar using quantum entanglement and microwaves which may potentially be useful for the development of improved radar systems, security scanners and medical imaging systems.

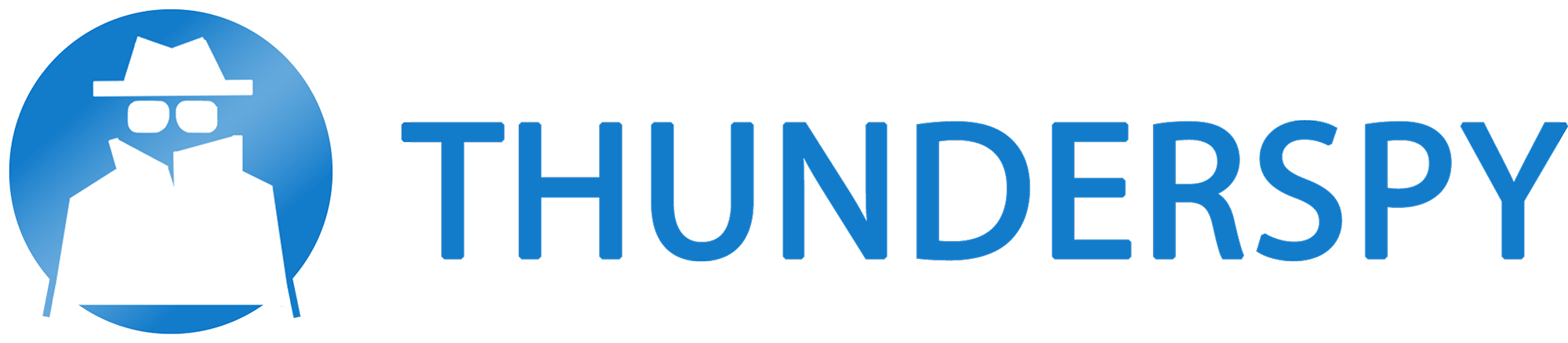
10 May: Computer scientists disclose the existence of Thunderspy, a security vulnerability that may impact millions of Apple, Linux, Windows and pre-2019 computers.

- 10 May
  - Computer scientists disclose the existence of Thunderspy, a security vulnerability based on the Intel Thunderbolt port, that can result in an evil maid attack of an unattended device gaining full access to a computer's information in about five minutes and may affect millions of macOS, Linux and Windows computers including any computer with an enabled Thunderbolt port manufactured before 2019, and some after that.
  - Scientists report to have discovered the closest relative of SARS-CoV-2 in most of the virus genome reported to date in a bat. RmYN02 has a 93.3% nucleotide identity with SARS-CoV-2 and also contains a four amino-acid insertion at the S1/S2 cleavage site, which adds to the evidence that supports the theory of a natural origin of SARS-CoV-2.
- 11 May – Researchers report the development of synthetic red blood cells that for the first time have all of the natural cells' known broad natural properties and abilities. Furthermore, methods to load functional cargos such as hemoglobin, drugs, magnetic nanoparticles, and ATP biosensors may enable additional non-native functionalities.

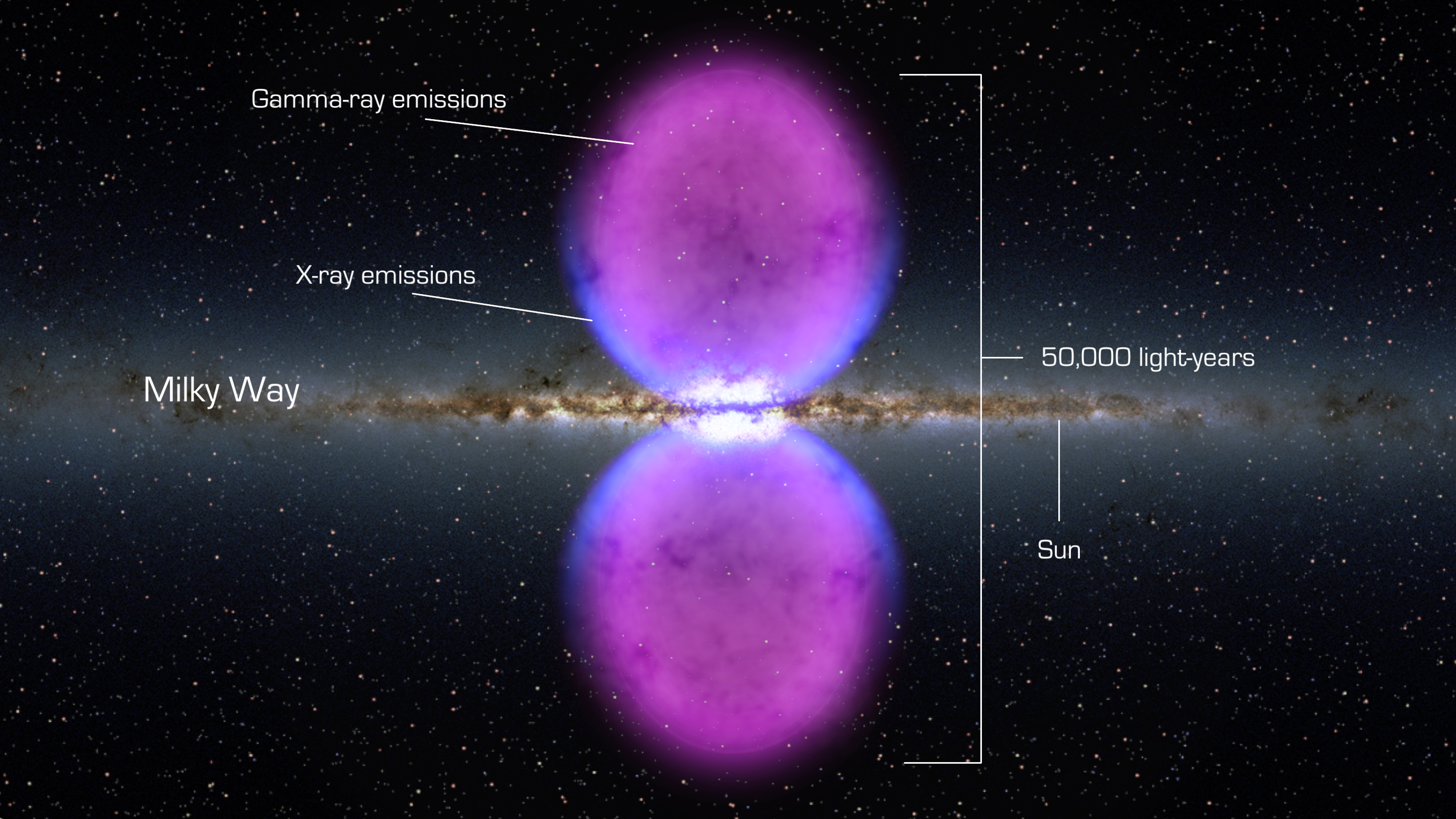
12 May: Astronomers suggest that a Seyfert flare 3.5 Mya from Sagittarius A* created the large X-ray/gamma-ray Fermi Bubbles (pictured) around the Galactic Center and illuminated the Magellanic Stream.

- 12 May
  - Researchers report to have developed a method to selectively manipulate a layered manganite's correlated electrons' spin state while leaving its orbital state intact using femtosecond X-ray laser pulses. This may indicate that orbitronics – using variations in the orientations of orbitals – may be used as the basic unit of information in novel IT devices.
  - Astronomers report in a preprint that a Seyfert flare 3.5 million years ago with a burst of ionizing radiation from Sagittarius A* created the large X-ray/gamma-ray Fermi Bubbles around the Galactic Center and reached so far into space that it illuminated the Magellanic Stream – a stream of gas extending from two of the Milky Way's satellite galaxies.
- 13 May
  - Scientists report to have evolved 10 clonal strains of a common coral microalgal endosymbionts at elevated temperatures for 4 years, increasing their thermal tolerance for climate resilience. Three of the strains increased the corals' bleaching tolerance after reintroduction into coral host larvae. Their strains and findings may potentially be relevant for the adaptation to and mitigation of climate change and further tests of algal strains in adult colonies across a range of coral species are planned.
  - Researchers report to have identified the world's oldest arthropod and oldest land-animal living persistently on land: the Myriapod millipede-ancestor Kampecaris obanensis, dating back 425 million years to the Silurian period. According to the study the 2.5 cm specimen found in Scotland in 1899 adds evidence for a rapid co-evolution of bugs and plants from lake-communities to complex forest ecosystems in just 40 million years.
- 14 May
  - A study on the human genetic history of East Asians using DNA of 25 individuals from ca. 9,500-4,200 years ago and one individual from ca. 300 years ago indicates a southern China origin of proto-Austronesians, and that migration and gene flow played an important role in the prehistory of coastal Asia during the Neolithic Revolution, the transition from hunter-gathering to agricultural economies, with a spread of northern East Asian ancestry across southern East Asia. Contemporary mainland East Asians from both the north and south share a closer genetic relationship to found northern Neolithic East Asians.
  - In a published unedited manuscript researchers show which host cell pathways are modulated by a SARS-CoV-2 infection by creating a cellular infection profile by analysing the translatome and proteome at different times after infection. They also show that inhibition of these pathways with identified drugs prevented viral replication in human cells which may aid the development of COVID-19 therapies.
  - An interdisciplinary team of virologists, microbiologists and computational scientists confirmed the predicted subgenomic RNAs of SARS-CoV-2 along with new RNA and dozens of unknown subgenomic RNAs.
- 15 May
  - Geologists report that the earliest known mass extinction, the Late Ordovician mass extinction (LOME), 445 million years ago, may have been the result of global warming, related to volcanism and anoxia, and not the result, as considered earlier, of cooling and glaciation.
  - A researcher reports that in a supercomputer model simulation a realistic extinction of the Neanderthal population can only be simulated when Homo sapiens is considerably more effective in exploiting scarce glacial food resources as compared to Neanderthals, with interbreeding and abrupt climate change only being minor contributors to their extinction.
- 18 May – A researcher publishes an objective Bayesian analysis which estimates that the emergence of life is likely a rapid process and not a slow and rare scenario and that the emergence of intelligence is slightly more likely to be rare.

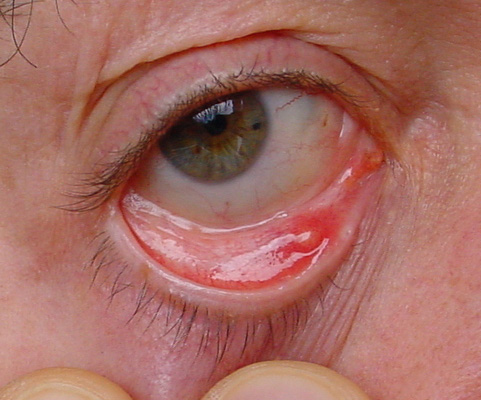
21 May: Researchers report to have developed a way to use smartphone images of a person's inner eyelids to assess blood hemoglobin levels.

- 19 May
  - Researchers report to have developed the first integrated silicon on-chip low-noise single-photon source compatible with large-scale quantum photonics.
  - Researchers report a temporary 17% drop in daily global CO_{2} emissions by early April 2020 compared with the mean 2019 levels during the COVID-19 forced confinements. At the peak of the interventions, where 89% of global emissions were in areas under some confinement, emissions in individual countries decreased by –26% on average. Estimations on the impact on 2020 annual emissions are between -2% and -13%. The largest reductions were due to reductions of surface transport. Despite this on May 4 UN Climate Change reports that the CO_{2} concentration in the atmosphere reached an all-time daily high of the ca. 60-year record on May 3.
  - Astronomers from Jodrell Bank Observatory report that the fast radio burst FRB 121102 exhibits the same radio burst behavior ("radio bursts observed in a window lasting approximately 90 days followed by a silent period of 67 days") every 157 days, suggesting that the bursts may be associated with "the orbital motion of a massive star, a neutron star or a black hole".
- 20 May
  - Researchers report estimations of green snow algae community biomass and distribution along the Antarctic Peninsula and project a net increase in their extent and biomass and coastal Antarctica turning more green due to climate change.
  - Scientists report that genome-wide data of 19 Siberians of the Upper Paleolithic to Bronze Age of up to ca. 14,000 years ago show the most deeply divergent connection between Upper Paleolithic Siberians and the indigenous peoples of the Americas and that long-range human mobility across Eurasia during the Early Bronze Age as well as prolonged local admixture that lead to an ancestry that gave rise to all non-Arctic Native Americans.
  - ESA reports that its Swarm satellite constellation is being used to better understand the mysterious South Atlantic Anomaly whereby the magnetic field has lost around 9% of its strength on a global average over the last 200 years in large area. They are investigating the processes in Earth's core driving these changes, which have caused technical disturbances in satellites and may be relevant to a potential geomagnetic reversal, and found that the anomaly could split up into two separate low points.
  - Astronomers report to have discovered a large rotating disk galaxy, dating back to when the universe was only 1.5 billion years old – the Wolfe Disk. Previously it was believed that such galaxies could not grow as big and well-ordered so early, which indicates there possibly being a need to revise theories of galaxy formation and evolution.

23 May: Comet C/2019 Y4 (ATLAS) reaches its nearest point to Earth. A few days later the Solar Orbiter flies through its ion gas tail and its dust tail. The image shows a comet's tails.

- 21 May
  - Researchers report a one-minute novel coronavirus test with 90% accuracy, based on the "change in the resonance in the THz spectral range" shown by the coronavirus through THz spectroscopy".
  - Researchers report to have developed a way to use smartphone images of a person's inner eyelids to assess blood hemoglobin levels with high precision. Usually these proteins in red blood cells are measured by the use of an hemoglobinometer or with a standard blood test for detecting anemia or other health issues. They are working on a mobile app.
  - Researchers report the development of a naked-eye colorimetric assay COVID-19 test based on nanoparticles for diagnosis without advanced laboratory techniques within 10 minutes from isolated RNA samples.
  - Researchers report that two Neanderthal haplotypes carrying the progesterone receptor gene entered the modern human population and that carriers of them in a cohort of ca. 450,000 present-day Britons – a third of its women – have more siblings, fewer miscarriages, and less bleeding during early pregnancy which, according to the study, suggests that these progesterone receptor alleles promote fertility. The study shows that genetic variants which were introduced into modern humans by mixing with Neanderthals can have effects in people living today.

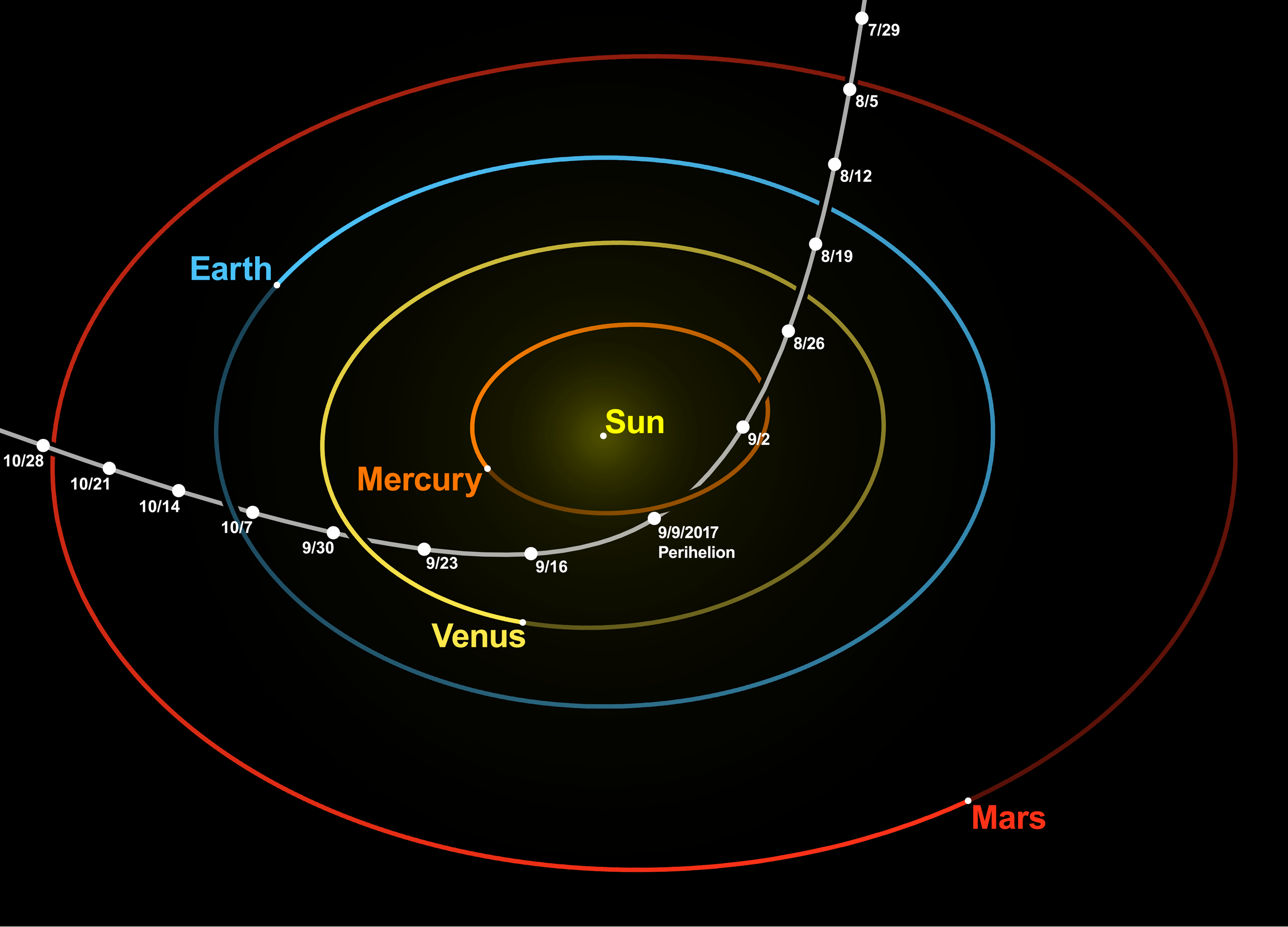
26 May: According to scientists all of ʻOumuamua's (pictured) observed properties could be explained if it was an "iceberg" of molecular hydrogen ice.

- 22 May
  - Australian computer scientists report achieving, thus far, the highest internet speed in the world from a single optical chip source over standard optical fiber, amounting to 44.2 Terabits per sec, or "downloading 1000 high definition movies in a split second".
  - Scientists publish evidence for the early differentiation of the cline of Italian variation dating back to the Late Glacial and for Neolithic and distinct Bronze Age migrations having further differentiated their gene pools. Ancestors of present-day Italians are believed to have experienced an extraordinary history of migrations and gene flow as main factors underlying their genetic diversity which is one of the highest across Europe.
- 23 May – Comet C/2019 Y4 (ATLAS) reaches its nearest point to Earth. It reaches its perihelion (closest to the Sun) on May 31. The Solar Orbiter spacecraft flies through comet ATLAS' ion tail between May 31 and June 1 as well as its dust tail in the solar wind on June 6.
- 25 May
  - Researchers report the creation of a sensor only 11 atoms in size, able to capture magnetic waves.
  - Scientists report in a preprint that they are confirming the existence of an Earth-sized planet around Proxima Centauri, the closest star to the Sun, whose discovery was announced in August 2016. ESPRESSO data confirms the presence of Proxima b and shows that it has a minimum mass of ca. 1.17 Earth masses and is located in the habitable zone of its star.
- 26 May
  - Astronomers report the detection of several very powerful explosions, newly classified as Fast blue optical transients (FBOTs), similar in ways to the much less energetic FBOT SN 2018cow observed in 2018.
  - Simulations by Imperial College London reveal that the Chicxulub impactor produced a "worst case" scenario in terms of lethality for the dinosaurs, arriving from the north-east at a 60° angle, which maximised the amount of gases and debris thrown up into Earth's atmosphere.
  - Scientists report in a preprint paper, published in a journal in June, that all of ʻOumuamua's observed properties can be explained if it contained a significant fraction of molecular hydrogen ice. They suggest it had formed in an interstellar cloud where stars are born and "sat" relatively motionless with its ice getting worn away as it approached the Sun, explaining its shape.
  - Researchers suggest that a solution to what they consider to be the core of the space debris problem may be an international agreement to charge operators "orbital-use fees" for every satellite put into orbit and that this could more than quadruple the long-run value of the satellite industry by 2040.
- 27 May
  - Astronomers report that classical novae explosions are the galactic producers of the element lithium.
  - A study shows that social networks can function poorly as pathways for inconvenient truths, that the interplay between communication and action during disasters may depend on the structure of social networks, that communication networks suppress necessary "evacuations" in test-scenarios because of false reassurances when compared to groups of isolated individuals and that larger networks with a smaller proportion of informed subjects can suffer more damage due to human-caused misinformation.
- 29 May – Scientists publish a study which illustrates major regional variations in the shares of Mesolithic hunter-gatherer to Neolithic farmer genomic ancestry, highlighting the complexity of the biological interactions during the Neolithic expansion in Europe.
- 30 May – SpaceX successfully launches two NASA astronauts into orbit on a Crew Dragon spacecraft from Pad 39A of the Kennedy Space Center in Florida, the first crewed spacecraft to take off from U.S. soil since 2011.

=== June ===
1 June: Geologists identify the largest known eruption in the Yellowstone hotspot track, which occurred around 8.72 Ma.

1 June: Researchers publish a study using data on vertebrates on the brink to extinction, in which they conclude that a human-caused potential sixth mass extinction is likely accelerating.
- 1 June
  - Astronomers report narrowing down the source of fast radio bursts (FRBs), which may now plausibly include "compact-object mergers and magnetars arising from normal core collapse supernovae".
  - The existence of quark cores in neutron stars is confirmed by Finnish researchers.
  - Geologists report two newly identified supervolcano eruptions associated with the Yellowstone hotspot track, including the region's largest and most cataclysmic event – the Grey's Landing super-eruption – which had a volume of ≥2800 km^{3} and occurred around 8.72 Ma. According to the study the Yellowstone hotspot may be waning, with another eruption of this scale not likely up to around 900,000 AD.
  - Researchers studying corvids report that extended parenting and extended childhood is crucial for the evolution of cognition and is having profound consequences for learning and intelligence. These may create longer developmental periods in which life-history is combined with social and ecological conditions such as via continuous exposure to role models that are relatively tolerant of the children as well as continuous opportunities for learning. Earlier research on primates showed that across species relative brain size covaries with cognitive skills and that adaptations that compensate developmental and energetic costs of large brains are critical for their evolution.
  - Findings of studying the spin direction of more than 200,000 spiral galaxies presented at the 236th American Astronomical Society meeting may suggest that the universe could have a defined structure and that the early universe could have been spinning. According to the researcher spiral galaxies in different regions of spacetime have been found to relate through their spin-directions and even though the asymmetry of spin-directions is just over 2%, the probability to have such asymmetry by chance is less than 1 to 4 billion.
  - Researchers publish a study using data on vertebrates on the brink to extinction and on vertebrates that recently became extinct, in which they conclude that a human-caused potential sixth mass extinction, which was claimed to be emerging by researchers of the study in 2015, is likely accelerating and suggest a number of reasons for that including extinctions causing further extinctions. They reemphasize "extreme urgency of taking much-expanded worldwide actions".
- 2 June – A study investigating the emergence of life on Earth and possibly other locations demonstrates a continuous chemical reaction network of simple organic and inorganic feedstocks that, in water and under high-energy radiation, generates compounds proposed to be precursors for early RNA, modelling how they may emerge spontaneously from a simple reagents mixture under conditions of early Earth through natural geochemistry.

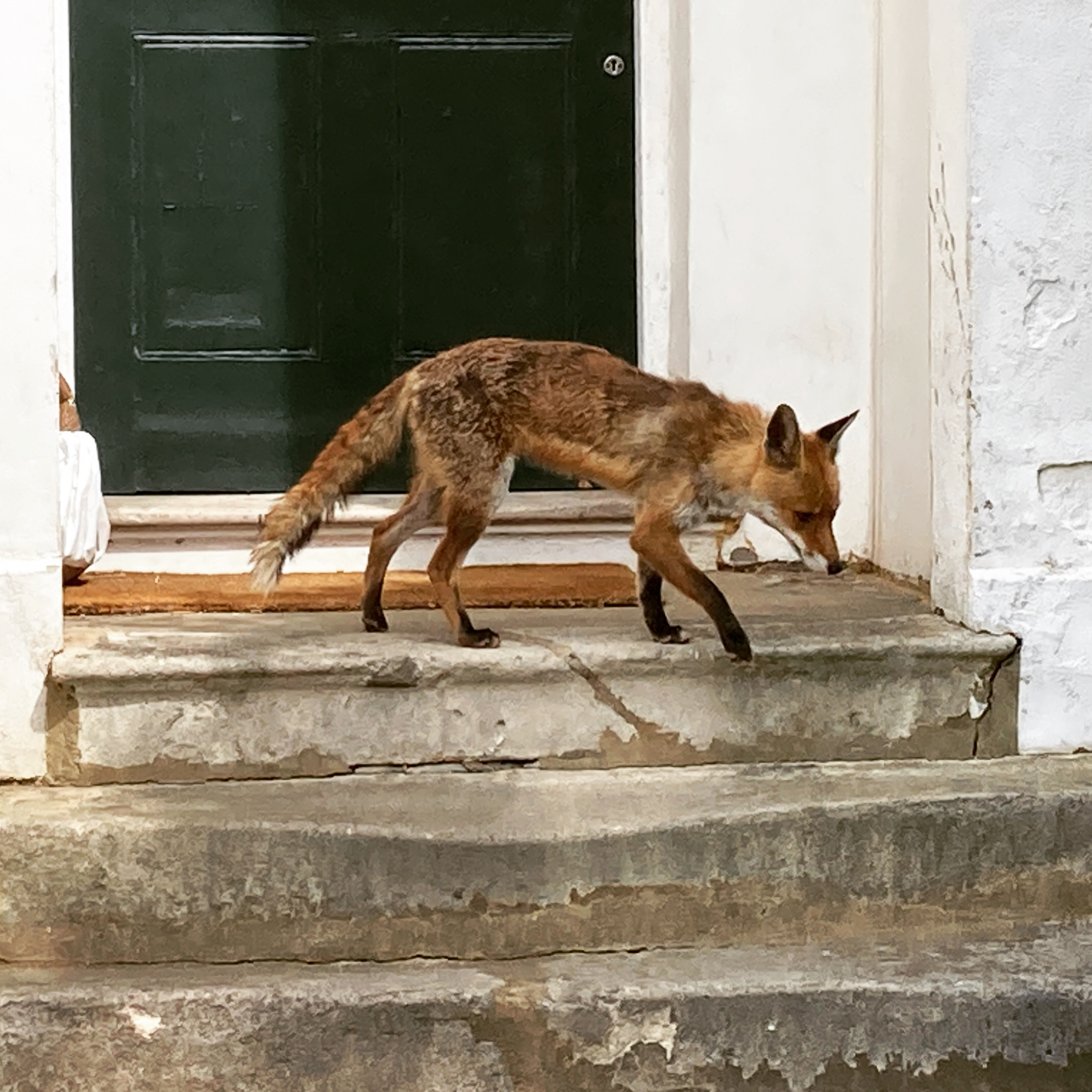
3 June: Researchers show that compared to rural populations urban red foxes in London are mirroring patterns of domestication similar to domesticated dogs, as they adapt to their city environment.

- 3 June
  - The discovery of the oldest and largest structure in the Maya region, a 3,000-year-old pyramid-topped platform Aguada Fénix, with LiDAR technology is reported. According to the researchers the discovery suggests the importance of communal work, as with early ceremonial complexes, in the initial development of Maya civilization.
  - Researchers report that mitochondrial genetic divergence could be used to predict the reproductive compatibility of mammalian hybrid offspring and that ancient anatomically modern humans (AMH), Neanderthals and Denisovans were genetically closer than polar bears and brown bears (1.6% divergence for Neanderthals and AMH and 2.4% for the bears) and, like the bears, were able to easily produce healthy hybrids.
  - Researchers show that urban red foxes from London and surrounding boroughs are divergent in skull traits, similar to domesticated dogs, as they adapt to their city environment with patterns of skull divergence between urban and rural habitats matching the description of morphological changes that can occur during domestication.
  - Scientists report that a randomized, double-blind, placebo-controlled trial found evidence that the drug hydroxychloroquine, controversially promoted by President of the United States Donald Trump as a potential treatment in mid-March, does not effectively protect people from COVID-19 administered within 4 days after exposure. Other researchers are continuing to explore whether hydroxychloroquine might prevent infections as pre-exposure prophylaxis.
- 4 June
  - Astronomers report that Kepler-160, a Sun-like star already known to host two planets, likely has a rocky third planet with orbit and light levels very similar to Earth.
  - Astronomers report that results from research of Hubble Space Telescope data and other supporting data, to be published in an upcoming paper, show that galaxies must have formed much earlier than previously thought – earlier than can be probed with the Hubble Space Telescope.
  - Scientists report that fruit fly mothers ensure their offspring's success through transgenerational epigenetic inheritance, suggesting that in humans the epigenetic modification H4K16ac might also be inherited as a "blueprint", encoding, to date unknown, information for successful embryonic development.
  - Scientists report bacterial mass lysis for colony-defense occurs when the bacteria will die anyway from toxin exposure from competing bacteria, explaining the evolutionary origin of this behaviour.
- 5 June – Two separate research teams publish two preprints on 5 June and 10 June according to which Neuropilin-1 (NRP1) is a second protein that SARS-CoV-2 uses to enter human cells by binding to it with its spike protein next to the protein ACE2.
- 7 June – News reports that NASA astronaut Kathy Sullivan, the first woman to walk in space in 1984, and now 68 years old, is the first woman to reach the deepest part of the ocean, nearly seven miles below the surface.
- 8 June
  - Computer experts warn Windows 10 users to update their computers with the latest security patches from Microsoft in order to avoid being infected with the wormlike SMBGhost security vulnerability, for which a proof-of-concept (PoC) exploit had been released on 2 June, which, in unpatched computers, may have serious consequences.
  - Researchers report results consistent with the hypothesis that pesticides contribute to monarch butterfly declines in the western United States.
- 9 June – Scientists confirm that the airborne radioactivity increase in Europe in autumn 2017 had a civilian background – Russian water-water energetic reactor (VVER) fuel at the end of its lifetime – and not a military one that is related to the production of plutonium for nuclear weapons.

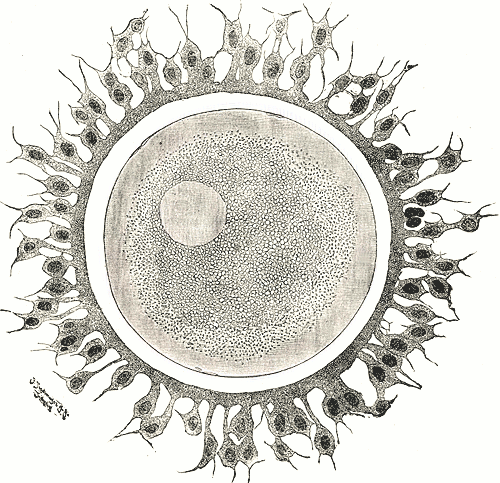
10 June: Scientists report evidence that females' follicular fluid's consistent and differential attraction of sperm from specific males constitutes a distinct post-mating choice.

- 10 June
  - Scientists report evidence that females' follicular fluid's consistent and differential attraction of sperm, an ability of human egg cells first reported in 1991, from specific males constitutes a post-mating choice and report that this mechanism did not reinforce pre-mating human mate choice decisions.
  - Researchers report that the most successful – in terms of "likelihood of prizewinning, National Academy of Science (NAS) induction, or superstardom" – protégés studied under mentors who published research for which they were conferred a prize after the protégés' mentorship. Studying original topics rather than these mentors' research-topics was also positively associated with success.

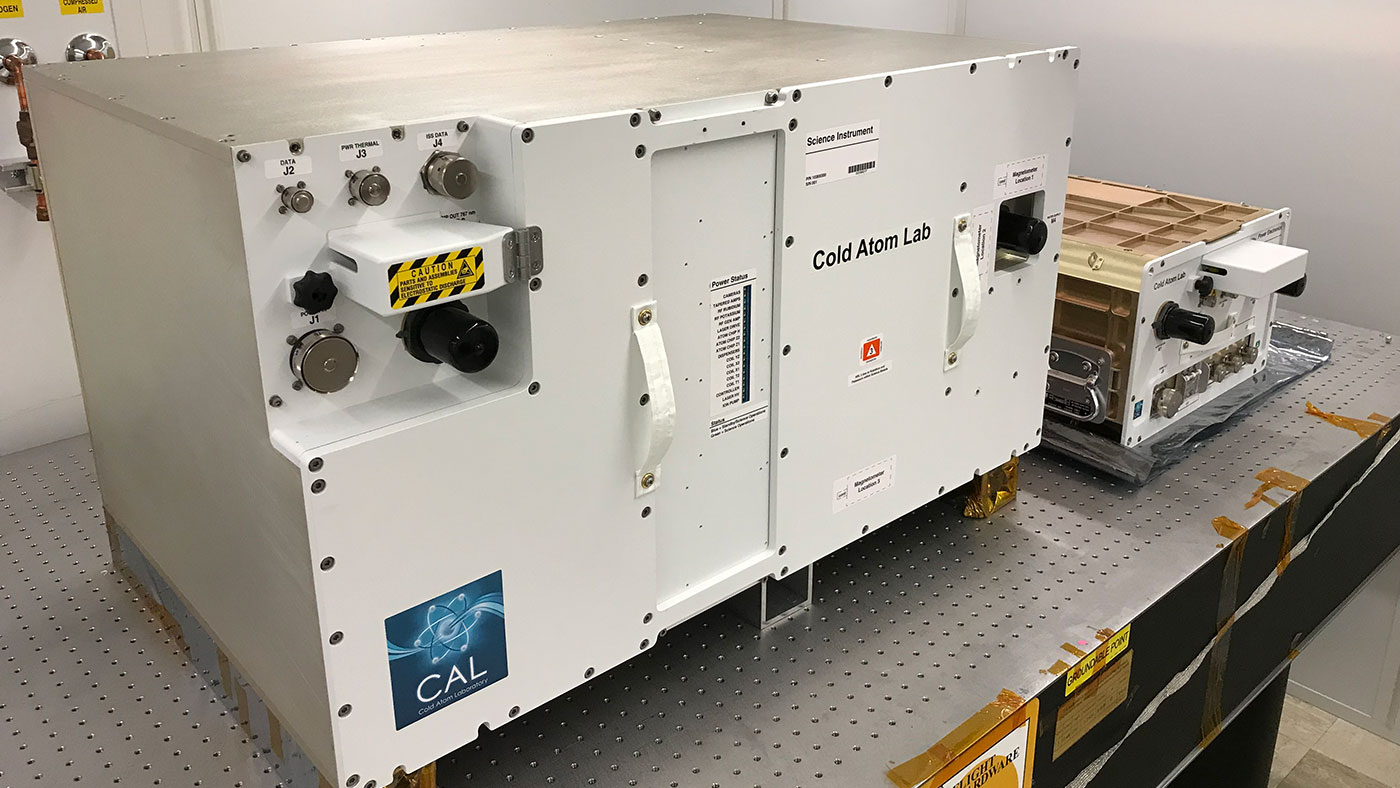
11 June: Scientists report the generation of Bose–Einstein condensates (BECs) in the Cold Atom Laboratory (pictured) aboard the ISS under microgravity which could enable improved research of BECs and quantum mechanics.

- 11 June
  - Two teams of neuroscientists report the identification of populations of neurons in mice that control their hibernation-like behaviors, torpor – a fasting-induced state with a substantially decreased metabolic rate and body temperature. They also show that stimulation of specific populations of neurons can induce the key features of torpor even in mice that are not calorically restricted as well as in rats, which do not naturally go into a state of torpor.
  - Scientists report the generation of rubidium Bose–Einstein condensates (BECs) in the Cold Atom Laboratory aboard the International Space Station under microgravity which could enable improved research of BECs and quantum mechanics, whose physics are scaled to macroscopic scales in BECs, support long-term investigations of few-body physics, support the development of techniques for atom-wave interferometry and atom lasers and has verified the successful operation of the laboratory.
  - Scientists report findings that suggest that some species of crocodile-ancestors – here the Crocodylomorph Batrachopus grandis ichnosp. nov. – walked on their two hind legs and had a length of over three meters during the Lower Cretaceous.
- 12 June
  - Scientists announce preliminary results that demonstrate successful treatment during a small trial of the first to use of CRISPR gene editing (CRISPR-Cas9) to treat inherited genetic disorders – beta thalassaemia and sickle cell disease.
  - Archaeologists report the earliest evidence for bow and arrow use and possibly the manufacturing of clothes or nets outside of Africa, in the tropics of Sri Lanka ~48 kya.
  - Scientists report that extensive coal burning and combustion of other organic matter in Siberia likely was a cause of Earth's most severe extinction event, the Permian-Triassic extinction event ~252 Mya.
  - Geophysicists provide the first comprehensive, wide-area, high-resolution view of the Earth's core-mantle boundary and show that heterogenous, unusually dense structures at the boundary are more widespread than previously known.
- 13 June – Scientists report that early supercomputer climate modelling results that are being compiled for the sixth assessment by the United Nations Intergovernmental Panel on Climate Change by more than 20 institutions due to be released in 2021 suggest a higher climate sensitivity than previously believed with 25% of the models showing a sharp upward shift from 3 °C to 5 °C in climate sensitivity supporting or revising worst-case projections of over 5 °C of global warming. The projections of more future warming may be due to a role of clouds. According to a study published on 24 June cloud feedbacks and cloud-aerosol interactions are the most likely contributors to the high values and increased range of equilibrium climate sensitivity in the CMIP6 model.

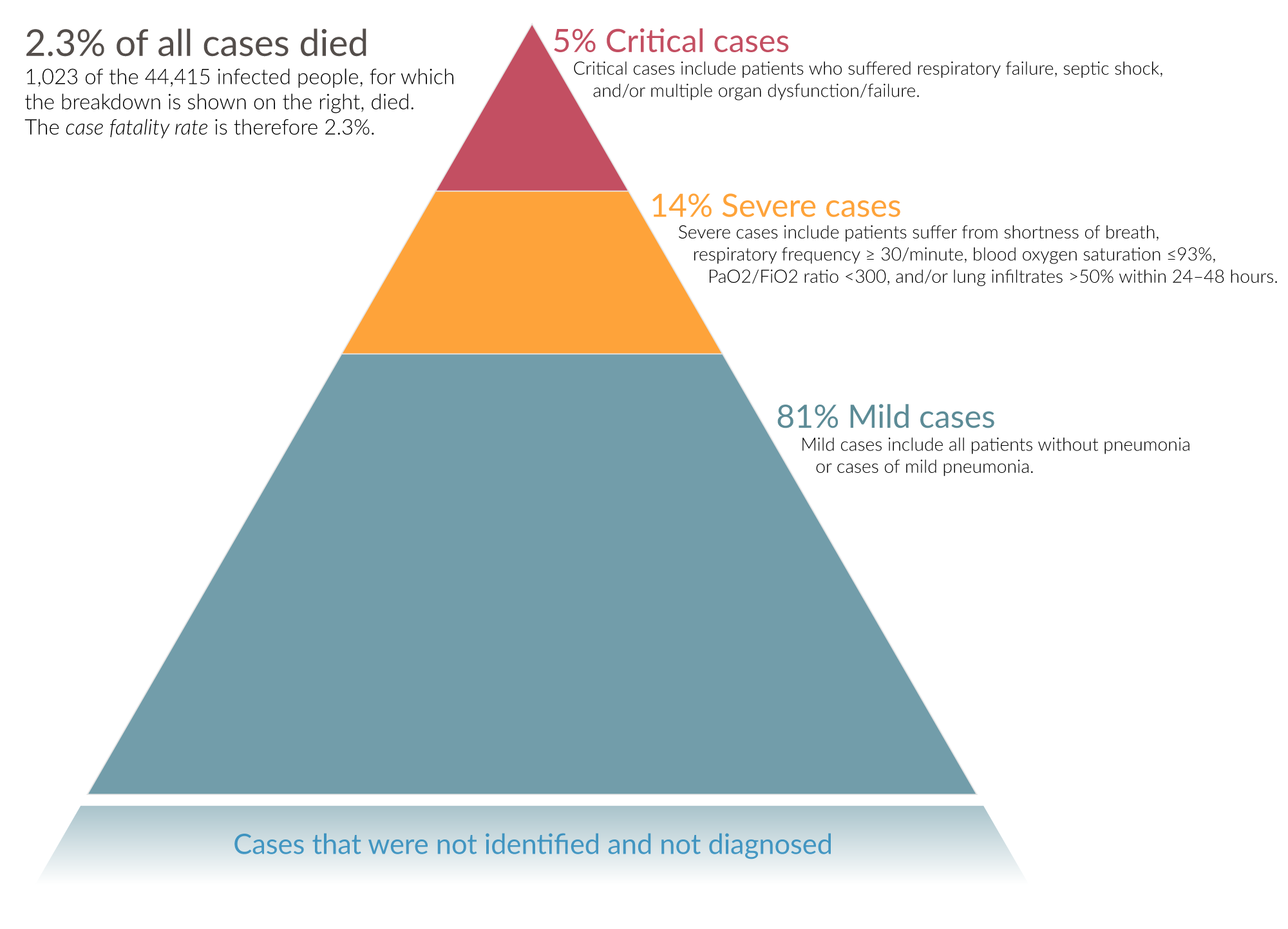
15 June: Scientists estimate that about a fifth of the world population, belong to a vulnerable group which has at least one underlying condition that raises the risk of severe disease when contracting COVID-19. The image shows the severity of diagnosed COVID-19 cases in China.

- 15 June
  - Astronomers report the possible existence of over 30 "active communicating intelligent civilizations", or Communicating Extra-Terrestrial Intelligent (CETI) civilizations (none within our current ability to detect due to various reasons including distance or size) in our own Milky Way galaxy, based on the latest astrophysical information – including a longevity of the only known technological civilization that is emitting signals to space of about 100 years to date.
  - A study of broad-tailed hummingbirds shows that hummingbirds can discriminate non-spectral colors due to birds' fourth color-sensitive visual cone (humans have three) and demonstrate a system for investigating animal color vision.
  - A scientific analysis estimates that as of 2020 about 1.7 bn people (UI 1·0–2·4) people, or 22% (UI 15–28%) of the world population, belong to a vulnerable group which has at least one underlying condition that raises the risk of severe disease when contracting COVID-19 and that about 4% [3–9] of the global population would require hospital admission if infected. They are describing their results as uncertain and state that the risk varies considerably by age and that they did not consider some risk factors such as obesity.
  - Scientists report the development of the smallest synthetic molecular motor, consisting of 12 atoms and a rotor of 4 atoms, shown to be capable of being powered by an electric current using an electron scanning microscope and moving even with very low amounts of energy due to quantum tunneling.

17 June: Possible first detection of Solar axion by particle physicists (image of a xenon atom, used in the experiments).

- 16 June
  - The University of Oxford reports that a major trial of dexamethasone – a cheap, widely available corticosteroid medication – shows it can significantly reduce mortality in COVID-19 patients.
  - Astronomers map the atmosphere of the red supergiant star Antares in unprecedented detail, using both the Atacama Large Millimeter/submillimeter Array (ALMA) and the National Science Foundation's Karl G. Jansky Very Large Array (VLA). The map is the most detailed yet obtained of any star, other than the Sun.
  - Scientists report simulation results that indicate that flushing a toilet can create a large, widespread cloud of aerosol droplets containing viruses such as SARS-CoV-2 that lasts long enough for the droplets to be breathed in by others and offer suggestions concerning safer toilet use and recommendations for a better toilet design.
- 17 June
  - Physicists at the XENON dark matter research facility report an excess of 53 events, which may hint at the existence of hypothetical Solar axions. Other possibilities for the anomalous detection include a surprisingly large magnetic moment for neutrinos, and tritium contamination in the detector.
  - Scientists report in a preprint that genome-wide CRISPR-Cas9 knockout screens in monkey cells have identified genes that might help SARS-CoV-2 infect its hosts.
  - Results of a study indicate greater regional anthropogenic carbon storage in and ocean acidification of the Arctic Ocean than previously projected.
  - Quantum scientists report the development of a system that entangles two photon quantum communication nodes through a microwave cable that can send information in between without the photons ever being sent through, or occupying, the cable. On 12 June it was reported that they also, for the first time, entangled two phonons as well as erase information from their measurement after the measurement has been completed using delayed-choice quantum erasure.
- 18 June – NASA scientists report that exoplanets with oceans may be common in the Milky Way galaxy, based on mathematical modeling studies.

19 June: Scientists warn that worldwide growth in affluence, measured by GDP (pictured), is associated with the problematically high increase of resource use and pollutant emissions.

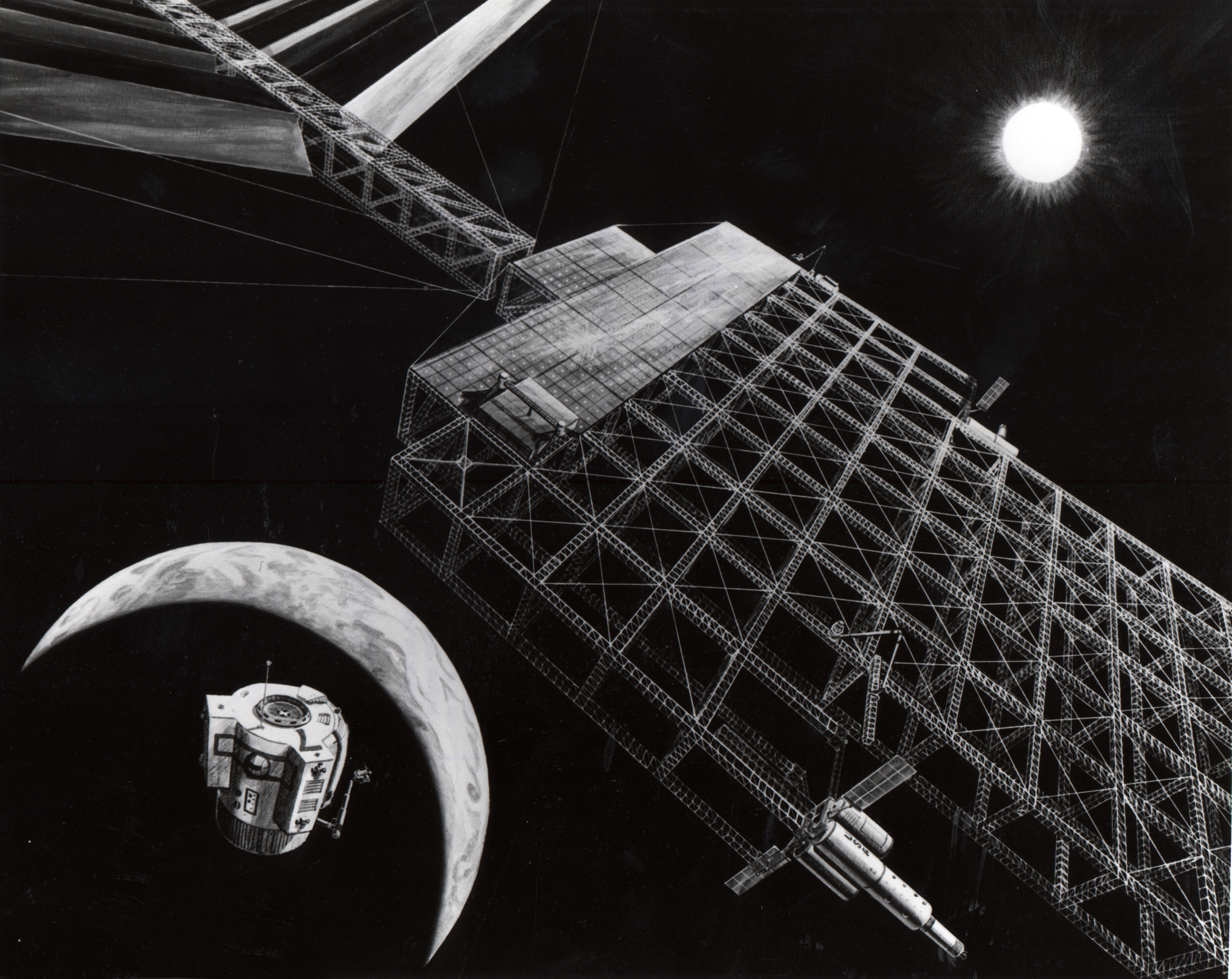
19 June: News reports the first NASA-funded search for technosignatures from advanced extraterrestrial civilizations other than radio waves only.

- 19 June
  - Scientists produce the first open-source all-atom model and simulation of a full-length spike protein of SARS-CoV-2 which the virus uses to enter cells. This may be useful for modeling and simulation research for the prevention and treatment of COVID-19.
  - Researchers report to have calculated an upper limit for a fundamental period of a possibly quantized time – as can be found in theories of quantum gravity and quantum cosmology – that is about 10 orders of magnitude above the Planck time – 10^{−33} seconds – and propose a theoretical apparatus and experiment that, if ever realized, could be capable of being influenced by effects on relevant timescales and possibly confirm their theory that is based on a physical model of time as an oscillating variable.
  - Scientists, as part of a World Scientists' Warning to Humanity-associated series, warn that worldwide growth in affluence has increased resource use and pollutant emissions with affluent citizens of the world – in terms of e.g. resource-intensive consumption – being responsible for most negative environmental impacts and central to a transition to safer, sustainable conditions. They summarise evidence, present solution approaches and state that far-reaching lifestyle changes need to complement technological advancements and that existing societies, economies and cultures incite consumption expansion and that the structural imperative for growth in competitive market economies inhibits societal change.
  - News reports the first SETI-specific grant that NASA has awarded in three decades. The grant funds the first NASA-funded search for technosignatures from advanced extraterrestrial civilizations other than radio waves, including the creation and population of an online technosignature library.
  - Scientists report that a novel cancer immunotherapy that included a personalized vaccine was shown to be successful in dogs. The vaccine was made from each dog's bone cancer cells. On 3 July it was reported that the results have helped obtain FDA approval for testing the method with human brain cancer patients.

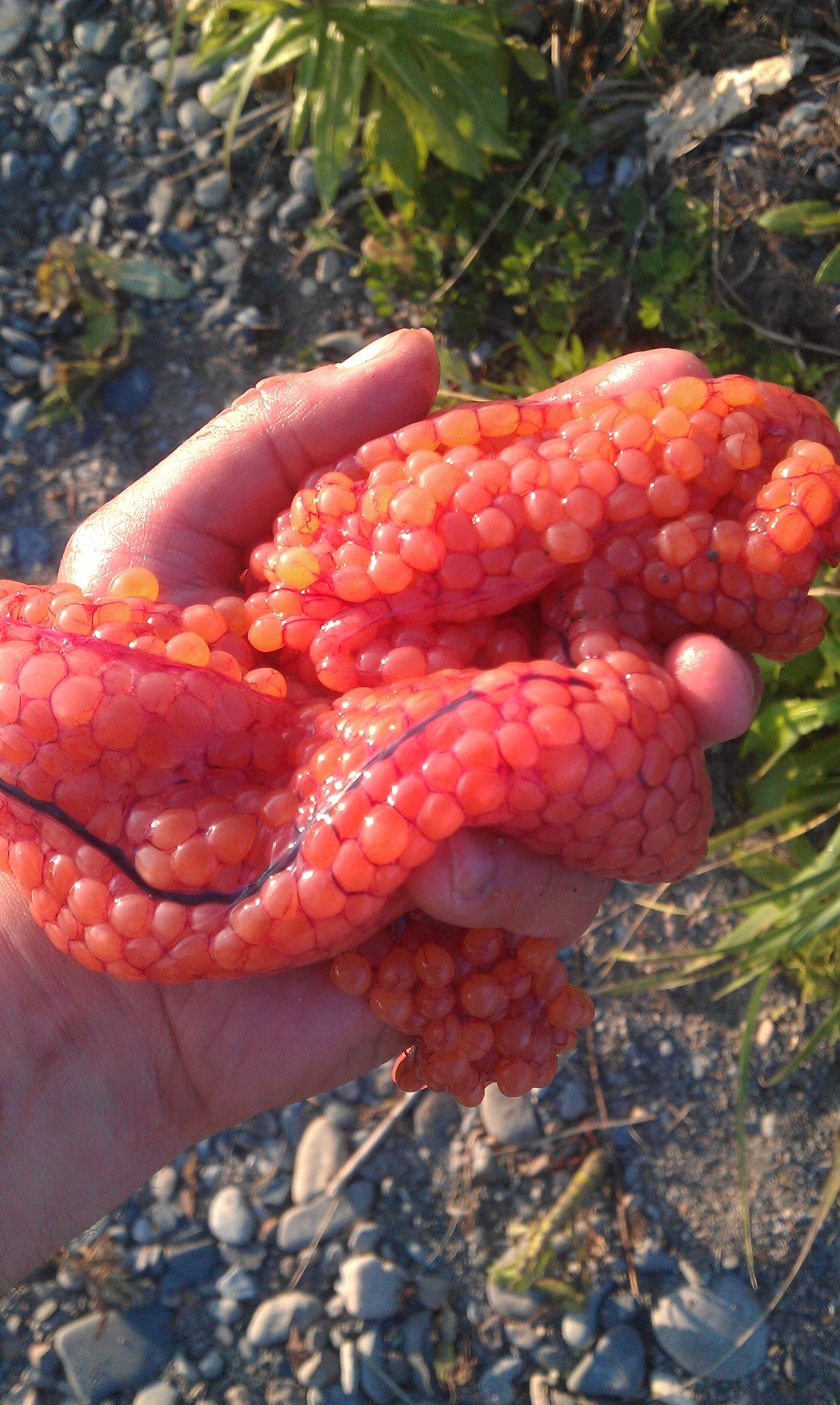
22 June: Scientists demonstrate that it is possible for fish to migrate via ingestion of fish eggs (pictured) by birds.

- 22 June
  - Astronomers report evidence that the dwarf planet Pluto may have had a subsurface ocean, and consequently may have been habitable, when it was first formed.
  - Scientists demonstrate that it is possible for fish to migrate via ingestion of fish eggs by birds.
  - Scientists demonstrate that it may be possible – for advanced extraterrestrial civilizations – to harvest rotational energy from black holes 51 years after it has been proposed to be possible and 49 years after an experiment to test the theory has been proposed.
  - Scientists report that the ancient fish species Tanyrhinichthys mcallisteri, which they assess to be highly similar to sturgeons in its features, evolved its sturgeon-like characteristics in a nearly simultaneous distinct evolutionary path from sturgeons.
- 23 June
  - Astronomers report details of the merging, in the "mass gap" of cosmic collisions, of a first-ever "mystery object": either a possibly too-heavy neutron star or a too-light black hole, with a black hole, that was detected as a gravitational wave, GW190814. According to one of the researchers, "We don't know if this object is the heaviest known neutron star or the lightest known black hole, but either way it breaks a record."
  - The World Meteorological Organization announces a possible new temperature-record of 38 °C north of the Arctic Circle, which it seeks to verify and assess. It was reported on 20 June in Verkhoyansk, Russia amid a prolonged Siberian heatwave and an increase in wildfire activity.
- 24 June
  - The largest ever tanzanite gemstones are discovered, weighing 9.27 kg and 5.103 kg, respectively.
  - In a preprint astronomers report the discovery of the second oldest quasar, Pōniuāʻena (J1007+2115) that is twice as massive as the oldest one, ULAS J1342+0928, and existed 700 million years after the Big Bang, challenging models of the earliest supermassive black hole growth.
  - The World Meteorological Organization announces new records for the longest lightning bolt (700 km) and the "megaflash" with the longest duration (16.73 s).
- 25 June
  - Astronomers report detecting a gravitational wave, named GW190521g, that is associated with, for the first time ever, a flash of light from the merger, within the vicinity of a third very large black hole, of two smaller black holes. No light is typically emitted from the merger of black holes.
  - Scientists report, with a genetic study, the identification of the origin of domesticated chicken, including insights into their evolutionary history, suggesting that they initially derived from Gallus gallus spadiceus.
- 26 June – Astronomers report the detection of four odd radio circles (ORCs). unexplained astronomical objects that, at radio wavelengths, are highly circular and brighter along their edges. The observed ORCs are bright at radio wavelengths, but are not visible at visible, infrared or X-ray wavelengths. Two of the ORCs contain galaxies, observable at visible wavelengths, in their centers, suggesting that the galaxies might have formed these objects.
- 28 June – In two papers, the first of which published in February, scientists report the development of the possibly most lightweight biopolymer aerogel that is flexible and durable and has a relatively high electromagnetic shielding-performance.

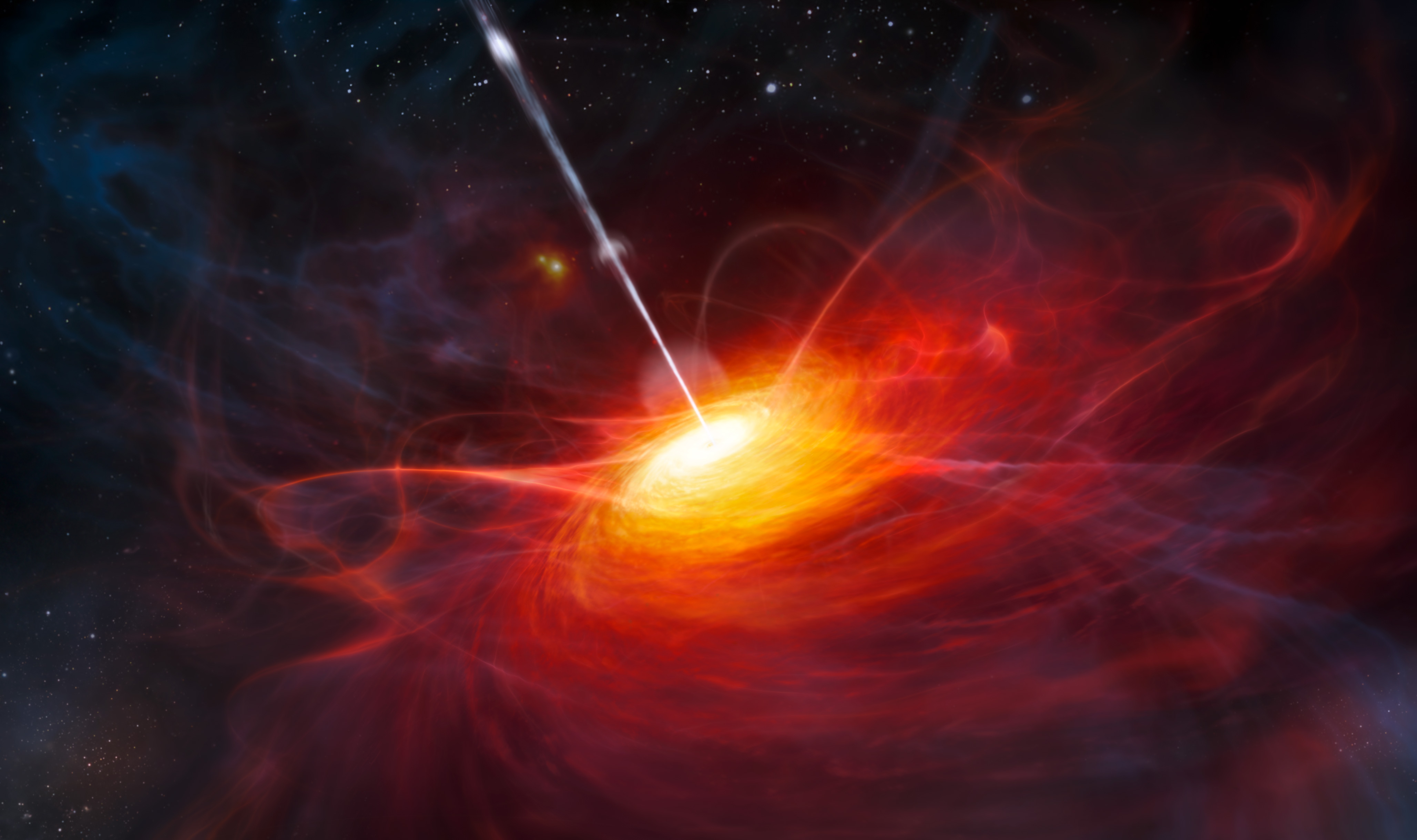
30 June: J2157 is identified as the fastest-growing black hole in the Universe.

- 30 June
  - Two surveys of 85.9% and 71.5% of the population of the small town of Vo', the location the first coronavirus death in Italy, find that according to the surveys 42.5% (95% CI 31.5-54.6%) of the confirmed SARS-CoV-2 infections of the surveys were asymptomatic. The published unedited manuscript also shows that individuals older than 50 showed a higher infection prevalence, that the average time to viral clearance was 9.3 days (8–13 days) and that viral load tended to peak around the day of symptom onset. In mid-March the scientists of the study, whose survey began on 6 March, reported that the research led to the discovery of the decisive role in the spread of the novel coronavirus by asymptomatic people.
  - Scientists report, after they publicized the first version of a preprint in April 2019, a possible explanation for the origin of high-energy cosmic neutrinos observed by the IceCube Neutrino Observatory, suggesting that emissions of coronae of supermassive black holes, such as possibly the active galactic nucleus of Messier 77, may be their source.
  - Astronomers report that J2157, discovered in 2018, is now known to have 34 billion solar masses and is consuming the equivalent of nearly 1 solar mass every day, making it the fastest-growing black hole known in the Universe.
  - Scientist at CERN report that the LHCb experiment has observed a four-charm quark particle never seen before, which is likely to be the first of a previously undiscovered class of particles.

== Deaths ==
- April 1
  - James Learmonth Gowans, British immunologist (b. 1924)
  - Richard Passman, American aerospace scientist and engineer (b. 1925)
- April 2
  - William Frankland, British allergist and immunologist (b. 1912)
  - Feriha Öz, Turkish pathalogist (b. 1933)
  - Arthur Whistler, American ethnobotanist (b. 1944)
- April 3
  - Arnold Demain, American microbiologist (b. 1927)
  - Alexander A. Gurshtein, Russian astronomer (b. 1937)
- April 4
  - James Gooch, American psychiatrist (b. 1934)
  - Xavier Dor, French embroyologist (b. 1929)
  - Volodymyr Korolyuk, Ukrainian mathematician (b. 1925)
  - Ivan Vakarchuk, Ukrainian physicist (b. 1947)
- April 5 – Margaret Burbidge, British and American astronomer and astrophysicist (b. 1919)
- April 6
  - Trevor Platt, British and Canadian biological oceanographer (b. 1942)
  - James F. Scott, American physicist (b. 1942)
  - Naek L. Tobing, Indonesian sexologist (b. 1940)
  - Gerhard Giebisch, American physiologist (b. 1927)
  - Fred Singer, Austrian and American physicist (b. 1924)
- April 7
  - Mishik Kazaryan, Russian physicist (b. 1948)
  - Adrian V. Stokes, British computer scientist (b. 1945)
- April 8
  - Aubrey Burl, British archaeologist (b. 1926)
  - Robert L. Carroll, American and Canadian paleontologist (b. 1938)
  - Norman I. Platnick, American arachnologist (b. 1951)
- April 9 – Won Pyong-oh, South Korean zoologist (b. 1929)
- April 11 – John Horton Conway, British mathematician (b. 1937)
- April 12 – Mikko Kaasalainen, Finnish mathematician (b. 1965)
- April 13
  - Jacques Blamont, French astrophysicist (b. 1926)
  - Thomas Kunz, American biologist (b. 1938)
  - Dennis G. Peters, American chemist (b. 1937)
- April 14 – Maria de Sousa, Portuguese immunologist (b. 1939)
- April 15
  - Jens Erik Fenstad, Norwegian mathematician (b. 1935)
  - John Houghton, British physicist (b. 1931)
- April 17
  - Patricia Kailis, Australian geneticist (b. 1933)
  - Iris Love, American archeologist (b. 1933)
- April 18
  - Virender Lal Chopra, Indian geneticist (b. 1936)
  - Lucien Szpiro, French mathematician (b. 1941)
- April 21
  - Ernest Courant, American physicist (b. 1920)
  - Sharadchandra Shankar Shrikhande, Indian mathematician (b. 1917)
- April 25 – Thomas Huang, American computer scientist (b. 1936)
- April 26 – John Ernest Randall, American ichthyologist (b. 1924)
- April 27
  - Sarah Milledge Nelson, American archaeologist (b. 1931)
  - Sylvie Vincent, Canadian anthropologist and ethnologist (b. 1941)
- April 28
  - Robert May, Baron May of Oxford, Australian zoologist and ecologist (b. 1936)
  - Paul Marks, American geneticist and oncologist (b. 1926)
- May 1 – Judith Esser-Mittag, German gynecologist (b. 1921)
- May 2
  - Daniel S. Kemp, American organic chemist (b. 1936)
  - George Kauffman, American chemist (b. 1930)
  - Bing Liu, Chinese medical researcher (b. 1982)
  - Maurice Dayan, French psychoanalyst (b. 1935)
  - Meyer Rubin, American geologist (b. 1924)
- May 3
  - John Hugh Seiradakis, Greek astronomer (b. 1948)
  - Zhang Qian'er, Chinese chemist (b. 1928)
- May 5
  - Sergei Adian, Russian mathematician (b. 1931)
  - Brian Axsmith, American paleobotanist and paleoecologist (b. 1963)
- May 7 – Margaret Loutit, New Zealander microbiologist (b. 1929)
- May 9 – Timo Honkela, Finnish computer scientist (b. 1962)
- May 11
  - Terry Erwin, American entomologist (b. 1940)
  - Ann Katharine Mitchell, British cryptanalyst and psychologist (b. 1922)
  - Ietje Paalman-de Miranda, Dutch mathematician (b. 1936)
  - Miloslav Stingl, Czech ethnologist (b. 1930)
- May 12
  - Thomas M. Liggett, American mathematician (b. 1944)
  - Ernest Vinberg, Russian mathematician (b. 1937)
- May 14
  - Bertram S. Brown, American psychiatrist (b. 1931)
  - Hans Cohen, Dutch microbiologist (b. 1923)
- May 17 – Aleksandra Kornhauser Frazer, Slovenian chemist (b. 1926)
- May 20 – Wan Weixing, Chinese space physicist (b. 1958)
- May 21
  - Arnulf Kolstad, Norwegen social psychologist (b. 1942)
  - Douglas Tyndall Wright, Canadian civil engineer (b. 1927)
- May 22 – Peter Harold Cole, Australian electrical engineer (b. 1936)
- May 23 – Jitendra Nath Pande, Indian pulmonologist (b. 1941)
- May 26 – Oleh Hornykiewicz, Austrian biochemist (b. 1926)
- May 30 – John Cole, British geographer (b. 1928)
- June 1 – Roberto Peccei, Italian physicist (b. 1942)
- June 2
  - Geoffrey Burnstock, Australian neuroscientist (b. 1929)
  - Tarq Hoekstra, Dutch archeologist (b. 1939)
- June 5
  - A. Dale Kaiser, American biochemist (b. 1927)
  - Tomisaku Kawasaki, Japanese pediatrician (b. 1925)
  - Friedrich Stelzner, German surgeon (b. 1921)
- June 7
  - Marina Blagojević, Serbian sociologist (b. 1958)
  - James D. Meindl, American electrical engineer (b. 1933)
  - Lynika Strozier, American researcher (b. 1984)
- June 8 – Nicholas Cummings, American psychologist (b. 1924)
- June 10
  - Duilio Arigoni, Swiss chemist (b. 1928)
  - Murray Hill, New Zealander seed scientist (b. 1939)
  - Hans Mezger, German automotive engineer (b. 1929)
  - William Tietz, American veterinarian (b. 1927)
- June 11
  - Marjorie G. Horning, American biochemist and pharmacologist (b. 1917)
  - Bernard J. Matkowsky, American applied mathematician (b. 1939)
- June 13 – Pepe el Ferreiro, Spanish archeologist (b. 1942)
- June 15
  - Beth Levine, American medical researcher (b. 1960)
  - Kirk R. Smith, American climatologist (b. 1947)
- June 16 – John J. Mooney, American chemical engineer (b. 1930)
- June 17
  - William C. Dement, American psychiatrist (b. 1928)
  - K. Anders Ericsson, Swedish psychologist (b. 1947)
  - Michael E. Soulé, American conservation biologist (b. 1936)
- June 18 – Sergei Khrushchev, Russian and American engineer (b. 1935)
- June 19 – Ralph Haas, Canadian engineer (b. 1933)
- June 21 – Anthony J. Naldrett, Canadian geologist (b. 1933)
- June 22 – Karlman Wasserman, American physiologist (b. 1927)
- June 24
  - Robert L. Carneiro, American anthropologist (b. 1927)
  - Nigel Weiss, South African astronomer and mathematician (b. 1936)
- June 25
  - Lester Grinspoon, American psychiatrist (b. 1928)
  - Olivier Le Fèvre, French astrophysicist (b. 1960)
- June 27 – David Stronach, British archeologist (b. 1931)
- June 30 – Xiao Bilian, Chinese endocrinologist (b. 1923)

== See also ==
- Category:Science events
- Category:Science timelines
- Impact of the COVID-19 pandemic on science and technology
  - COVID-19 apps
  - COVID-19 vaccine
  - Face masks during the COVID-19 pandemic
  - Open-source ventilator#COVID-19 pandemic
- List of technologies
- List of emerging technologies
- List of years in science
