= Maurice Dayan =

French psychoanalyst and academic (1935–2020)

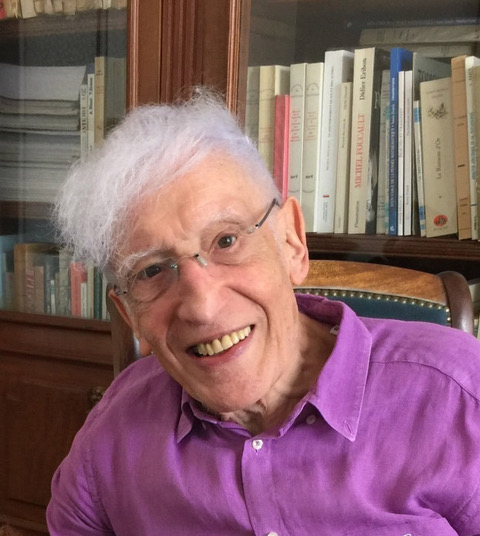
- Born: 25 January 1935; Paris, France
- Died: 2 May 2020 (aged 85)
- Occupation: Psychoanalyst

Maurice Dayan (25 January 1935 – 2 May 2020) was a French psychoanalyst and university professor.

== Biography ==
Dayan was the son of a postman. At the age of 14, he bought books by René Descartes, Baruch Spinoza, Immanuel Kant, Louis Lavelle, and Jean-Paul Sartre. He attended Lycée Turgot in Paris, and won 1st prize in philosophy at the Concours général in 1953.

He was admitted into the École normale supérieure de Saint-Cloud, earning his agrégation in philosophy in 1959. He earned his doctorate in philosophy from Paris Diderot University with a thesis titled Inconscient et Réalité.

He taught psychology at the University of Montpellier, then at Paris Descartes University. Dayan then served as a professor of psychopathology at Université Sorbonne Paris Nord, then at Paris Diderot University, where he taught alongside Jean Laplanche, François Gantheret, and Pierre Fédida. From 1995 to 2000, he directed the Laboratoire de psychanalyse et de psychopathologie, which was created by Laplanche in 1970.

Dayan was from the very beginning a member of the editorial board of the journal Psychanalyse à l'université (1975—1994), in which he published several articles.

Maurice Dayan died on 2 May 2020 at the age of 85 at Le Kremlin-Bicêtre.

== Publications ==
- "Représentation, délire, histoire" in Psychanalyse à l'université (1975)
- "Freud en Cacanie: de quelques prémisses historiques de la psychanalyse" in Psychanalyse à l'université (1977)
- L'Arbre des styles (1980)
- "Le fantasme et l'événement" in Psychanalyse à l'université (1985)
- Inconscient et réalité (1985)
- Les Relations au réel dans la psychose : critique de l'héritage freudien (1985)
- Un interprète en quête de sens (1986)
- Trauma et devenir psychique (1995)
- Le Rêve nous pense-t-il (2004)
- Dire et devenir : une exploration des effets du langage dans la temporalité de l'analyse (2014)
- "Le rêve nous pense-t-il ? Reprise d’une interrogation" in Le Coq-Héron (2016)
