= Brian Axsmith =

American paleobotanist (1962–2020)

Brian J. Axsmith (June 3, 1962 – May 5, 2020) was an American paleobotanist, paleoecologist, and professor of biology at the University of South Alabama, where he taught ecology, evolutionary biology, and the evolution of vascular plants. Axsmith studied the evolutionary history of conifers and vascular plants. He specialized in the Neogene paleobotany of the Gulf Coastal Plain in the present-day United States, especially Alabama and Mississippi, as well as the Mesozoic paleobotany of eastern North America and China.

== Life and career ==
Axsmith was raised in suburban Philadelphia. He received a Bachelor of Science from Millersville University of Pennsylvania. Axmsith obtained his doctorate in biology from the University of Kansas in 1998.

Some of Axsmith's most significant discoveries included the fossilized pollen and needles of the eastern white pine (Pinus strobus) in the Gulf Coastal Plain, which is no longer part of the tree's native range. Additionally, Axsmith uncovered the earliest known, post-Eocene fossil record of Carpinus, better known as the hornbeam or ironwood trees, in North America. Axsmith also discovered fossilized Pterocarya wingnuts in the Citronelle Formation in Mobile County, Alabama. Present-day pterocaryas are only found in Asia, but Axsmith's discovery indicated that the genus was once found in southeastern North America as well.

He was married to Jennifer Axsmith and had a son. Axsmith died from complications of COVID-19 in Mobile, Alabama, on May 5, 2020, at age 57, during the COVID-19 pandemic in Alabama, having been diagnosed in April.
