= Bing Liu (scientist) =

Chinese scientist (1982–2020)

Bing Liu (Chinese: 刘冰; 20 October 1982 – 2 May 2020) was a Chinese computational biologist living and researching in the United States. He was a Research Assistant Professor of Computational & Systems Biology Department at the University of Pittsburgh School of Medicine. He was 37 years old at the time of his death, in which he was shot dead in his home. Due to Liu's research into coronavirus during the COVID-19 pandemic at the time of his death, the case received American and Chinese media coverage.

== Career ==
Liu graduated with a master's degree and Ph.D. in computer science from the National University of Singapore. He was a postdoctoral researcher at Carnegie Mellon University. Both he and his wife retained Chinese citizenship.

== Death ==
Liu was found dead at his home in Ross Township, a suburb north of Pittsburgh, on 2 May 2020. His work on coronaviruses led to speculation that his murder was related to his work, but Pittsburgh Police said that he was shot as a result of a murder-suicide. The gunman was 46-year-old Hao Gu (Chinese: 顾浩), a software engineer from Moon Township, employed at Eaton Corporation. The police said that the murder was the result of a dispute over an intimate partner and that after murdering Liu, the gunman had gone back to his car and shot himself.

== Works ==
=== Books ===
- B Liu. Computational Modeling of Biological Pathways: Probabilistic Approximation and Analysis Techniques. Lambert Academic Publishing, ISBN 3847372114, Jan 2012. (176 pages)

=== Most recent articles ===
- W Sun, V Tyurin, G Mao, I Shrivastava, B Liu, Y Zhai, S Korolev, A Abramov, P Angelova, I Miller, O Beharier, H Dar, O Kapralov, T Hastings, J Greenamyre, C Chu, I Bahar, Y Sadovsky, H Bayır, Y Tyurina, R He, V Kagan "iPLA2G6 Protects Cells against Ferroptosis by Hydrolyzing the Lipid Signal of Death, 15-HpETE-PE: Relevance to Parkinson Disease Pathogenesis, "Nature Neuroscience, under review (2020).
- B Liu. "A Model Checking-based Analysis Framework for Systems Biology Models", The 57th ACM/IEEE Design Automation Conference (DAC), San Francisco, US (2020). IEEE, pp. 1–6
- Q Shi, F Pei, G Silverman, S Pak, D Perlmutter, B Liu, I Bahar." Mechanisms of Action of Autophagy Modulators Dissected by Quantitative Systems Pharmacology Analysis," International Journal of Molecular Sciences, 21(8). 2855 (2020). doi: 10.3390/ijms21082855
- S Thermozier, W Hou, X Zhang, D Shields, R Fisher, H Bayir, V Kagam, J Yu, B Liu, I Bahar, M W Epperly, P Wipf, H Wang, and J S Greenberger. "Anti-Ferroptosis Drug Enhances Total Body Irradiation Mitigation by Drugs that Block Apoptosis and Necroptosis," Radiation Research, [Epub ahead of print] (2020). doi: 10.1667/RR15486.1
- O Kapralov, Q Yang, H Dar, Y Tyurina, T Anthonymuthu, R Kim, C St. Croix, K Mikulska-Ruminska, B Liu, I Shrivastava, V Tyurin, H-C Ting, Y Wu, Y Gao, R Domingues, D Stoyanovsky, R Mallampalli, I Bahar, D Gabrilovich, H Bayir, and V Kagan "Redox Lipid Reprogramming Commands Susceptibility of Macrophages and Microglia to Ferroptotic Death," Nature Chemical Biology, 16:2780-290 (2020). doi: 10.1038/s41589-019-0462-8
- S Thermozier, X Zhang, W Hou, R Fisher, M W Epperly, B Liu, I Bahar, S Markovina, C Luke, G Silverman, and J S Greenberger. "Radioresistance of Serpinb3a-/- Mice and Derived Hematopoietic and Marrow Stromal Cell Lines," Radiation Research, 192(3):267-281 (2019). doi: 10.1667/RR15379.1.
- F Pei, H Li, B Liu, I Bahar. "Quantitative Systems Pharmacological Analysis of Drugs of Abuse Reveals the Pleiotropy of Their Targets and the Effector Role of mTORC1", Frontiers in Pharmacology, 10:191 (2019). doi: 10.3389/fphar.2019.00191

=== Most highly cited articles ===
- V E Kagan, G Mao, F Qu, J P F Angeli, S Doll, C S Croix, H Dar, B Liu, V A Tyurin, V B Ritov, O A Kapralov, A A Amoscato, J Jiang, T Anthonymuthu, D Mohammadyani, Q Yang, J Klein-Seetharaman, S Watkins, I Bahar, J Greenberger, R Mallampalli, B R Stockwell, Y Y Tyurina, M Conrad, H Bayir. Oxidized Arachidonic and Adrenic PEs Navigate Cells to Ferroptosis, Nature Chemical Biology, 13:81-90 (2017). doi:10.1038/nchembio.2238. Cited 320 times according to Google Scholar
- B Liu, J Zhang, P Y Tan, D Hsu, A M Blom, B Leong, S Sethi, B Ho, J L Ding, P S Thiagarajan. A Computational and Experimental Study of the Regulatory Mechanisms of the Complement System. PLoS Computational Biology, 7(1):e1001059 (2011).
- H Zhou, S Gao, N N Nguyen, M Fan, J Jin, B Liu, L Zhao, G Xiong, M Tan, S Li, L Wong. Stringent Homology-based Prediction of H. sapiens-M. tuberculosis H37Rv Protein-Protein Interactions. Biology Direct, 9(5):1-52 (2014). Cited 50 times according to Google Scholar

== Sources ==
- Bing Liu, personal site / Research Assistant Professor, Computational & Systems Biology Department, School of Medicine, University of Pittsburgh
- Bing Liu, Ph.D., Research Assistant Professor, Ph.D. in Computational Systems Biology, National U of Singapore
