= Alexander A. Gurshtein =

Russian astronomer (1937–2020)

Alexander Aronovich Gurshtein
- Born: February 21, 1937; Moscow, Russia
- Died: April 3, 2020 (aged 83); Grand Junction, Colorado
- Occupation: Astronomer
- Years active: 1959-2010
- Notable work: The Eternal Secret of the Sky

Alexander Aronovich Gurshtein (Russian: Александр Аронович Гурштейн, Aleksandr Aronovich Gurshteyn; February 21, 1937 – April 3, 2020) was a Soviet/Russian astronomer and historian of science.

== Early life ==
Gurshtein was born Jewish in Moscow (former USSR) on February 21, 1937. His father, Aron Sheftelevich Gurshtein, was a literary critic and writer, while his mother, Yelena Vasilievna Resnikova, was a journalist and editor at a Moskovan radio station.

In 1941, when Gurshtein was four years old, his father was killed in the Great Patriotic War during the Battle of Moscow. Following his father's death, he was raised by his mother and grandmother.

When Alexander was thirteen, he began visiting the Moscow Planetarium, which brought on his pursuit of astronomy.

== Education and career ==
Gurshtein attended Moscow State Institute of Geodesy and Cartography, and graduated with a degree in astrometry in 1959. Following his graduation, he worked at the Russian Academy of Sciences and in the Soviet Space program during the Space Race of the Cold War.

Gurshtein earned his Candidate of Science from Sternberg State Astronomical Institute, Moscow in 1966 and a Doctor of Science degree in Physics & Mathematics from Pulkovo Astronomical Observatory in Saint Petersburg in 1980.

Gurshtein was active as an astronomer in the space program and held a number of offices in professional organizations, including Head of Council for Astronomical Education and Vice Director of the Institute for History of Science & Technology, both for the Russian Ministry of Education. As a historian of science, he served as editor-in-chief of the Annual on History of Science, published by the Russian Academy of Sciences, and Deputy Editor-in-Chief for the academic monthly, Nature, published by the Russian Academy of Sciences. He was also the author of several books and articles on planetology, holder of five patents, and contributor to many international forums.

In 1995, he took a leave of absence from the Russian Academy and accepted a position as Visiting Professor of Astronomy & History of Science at Mesa State College in Grand Junction, Colorado. In later years he developed a concept of history of constellations and the zodiac which was published in American Scientist, Sky & Telescope, and other professional journals.
