= Hemoglobinometer =

Medical device used to measure hemoglobin concentration

Hemoglobinometry
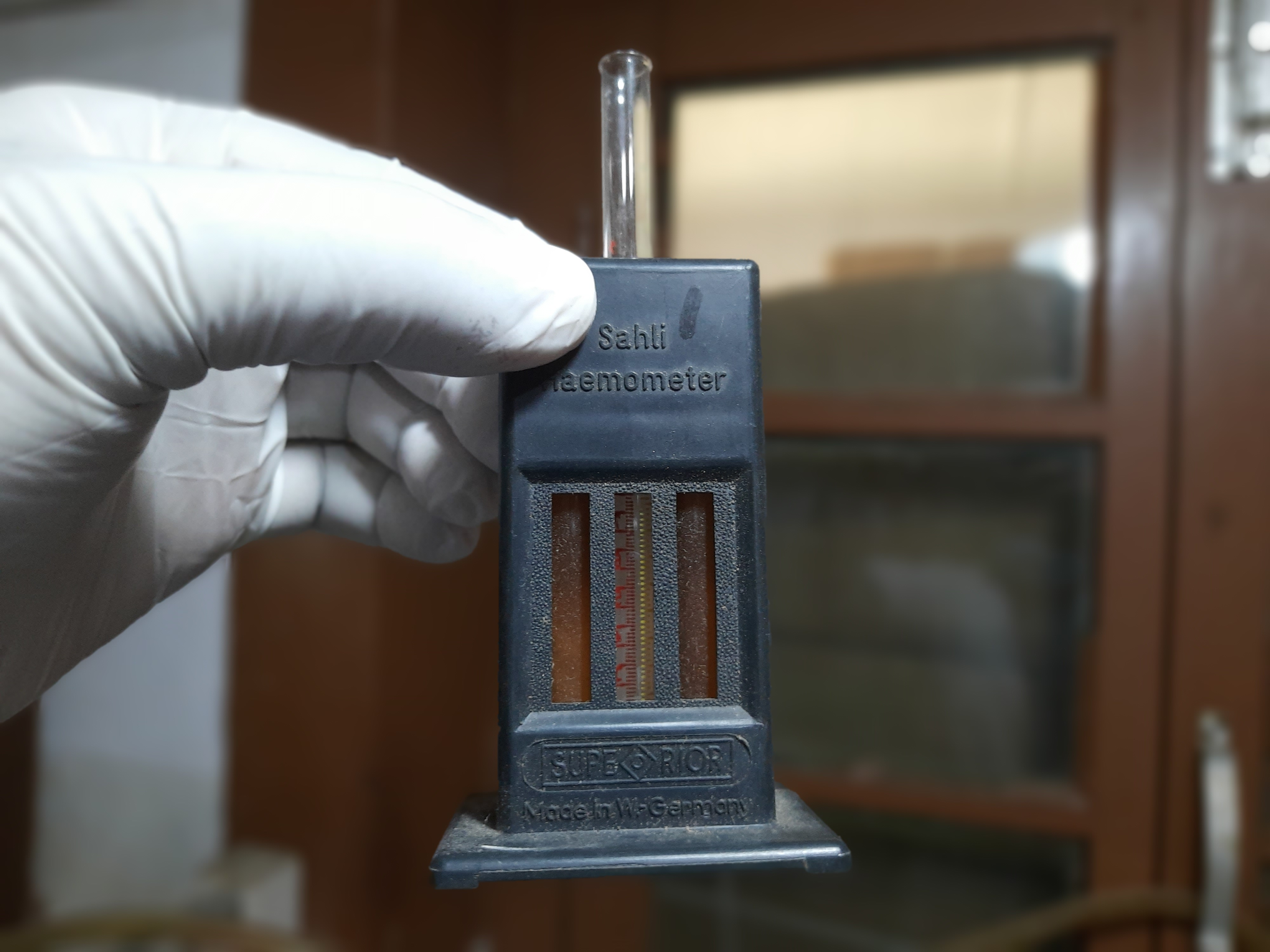
- Sahli's hemoglobinometer
- Specialty: Haematology, pathology
- ICD-10-PCS: D58.2–R71.0
- ICD-9-CM: 282.7
- MedlinePlus: 003645

A hemoglobinometer or haemoglobinometer (British English) is a medical device used to measure hemoglobin concentration in blood. It can operate by spectrophotometric measurement of hemoglobin concentration. Portable hemoglobinometers provide easy and convenient measurement of hematological variables, especially in areas where clinic laboratories are unavailable. Microprocessor-based hemoglobin meters are also used for measuring and documenting hemoglobin levels in clinical and research settings.

As per guidelines of National AIDS Control Organisation (NACO) for accurate results & mass screening, analysis using hemoglobinometer is a recommended method used for absorbance measurement of whole blood at Hb/HbO2/Isobestic point, based on microcuvette technology such as HemoCue 301 and Mokshit-Chanda-AM005A.

A haemometer is a simple laboratory instrument used to estimate the hemoglobin concentration in blood. It works by comparing the color intensity of a blood sample mixed with a reagent against a standardized color scale.

== Devices ==
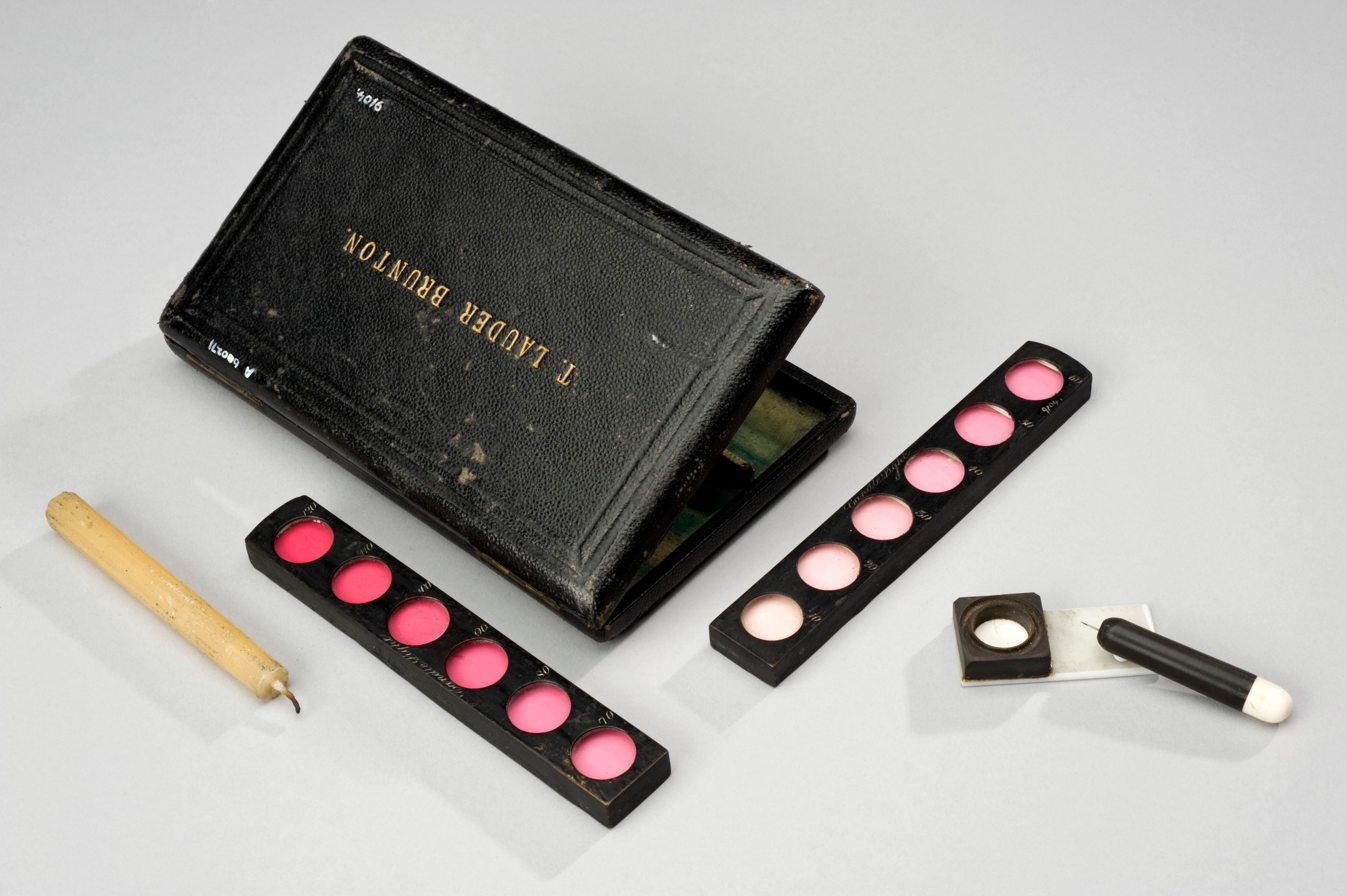
Hemoglobinometry that compares a blood sample to a color chart, in use circa 1850 - 1950

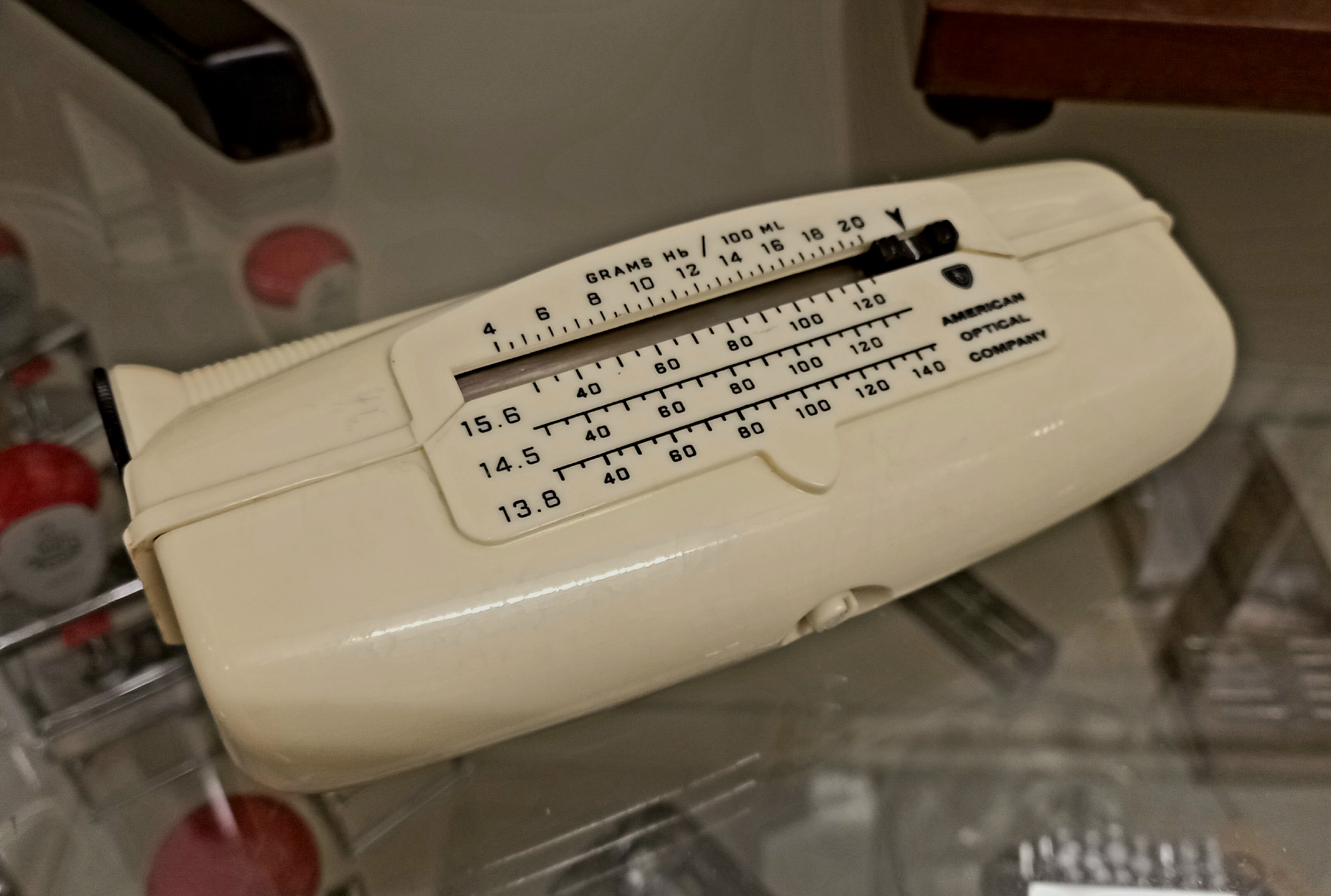
A hemoglobinometer made by the American Optical Company. The light of a battery-driven lamp is travelling on two paths to the eyepiece. One path goes through the blood sample, the other one through an adjustable filter. When the brightness of the two paths is equal, the hemoglobin level can be read on the device. Such devices were made in the 1940s.

== See also ==
- Hemocytometer
- Cytometry
- Glucose meter
- Blood chemistry
