= Zhang Qian'er =

Chinese chemist (1928–2020)

- 张乾二
- Born: August 15, 1928; Hui'an County, Fujian, China
- Died: May 3, 2020 (aged 91); Xiamen, Fujian, China
- Education: Xiamen University
- Scientific career
- Fields: Material structure
- Workplaces: Xiamen University
- Doctoral advisor: Lu Jiaxi

Chinese name
- Traditional Chinese: 張乾二
- Simplified Chinese: 张乾二
Transcriptions
Standard Mandarin
- Hanyu Pinyin: Zhāng Qián'èr

Zhang Qian'er (Chinese: 张乾二; pinyin: Zhāng Qián'èr; 15 August 1928 – 3 May 2020) was a Chinese chemist who was a professor and doctoral supervisor at Xiamen University. Zhang was a member of the 8th and 9th Standing Committee of the Chinese People's Political Consultative Conference. Zhang was a member of the 10th, 11th and 12th Standing Committee of the Chinese Peasants' and Workers' Democratic Party.

== Biography ==
Zhang was born into a highly educated family in the town of Chongwu, Hui'an County, Fujian, on August 15, 1928. He attended Jimei High School. In 1947, he was accepted to Xiamen University, where he majored in chemistry. After graduating in 1951, he became a post-graduate under the supervision of Lu Jiaxi. After completing a three-year graduate course, he stayed at the university and worked as a lecturer, and he was elected associate professor for 1962 and full professor for 1978. During the Cultural Revolution, he suffered political persecution. In 1978, he became dean of College of Chemistry and Chemical Engineering. He was appointed director of the Fujian Institute of Research on the Structure of Matter, Chinese Academy of Science, serving until 1992. He died in Xiamen, Fujian, on May 3, 2020, aged 91.

== Honours and awards ==
- 1982 State Natural Science Award (First Class)
- 1991 Member of Chinese Academy of Sciences (CAS)
- 2001 Science and Technology Progress Award of the Ho Leung Ho Lee Foundation
