= Richard Passman =

American aeronautical engineer (1925–2020)

- Born: June 30, 1925; Cedarhurst, New York, U.S.
- Died: April 1, 2020 (aged 94); Silver Spring, Maryland, U.S.
- Education: University of Michigan
- Occupations: Aeronautical engineer, non-fiction writer
- Employer(s): Bell Aircraft, General Electric, United States Department of Energy

Richard Passman (June 30, 1925 – April 1, 2020) was an American aeronautical engineer and space scientist. He worked on projects including the Corona, the first spy satellite. He was a volunteer in the Smithsonian National Air and Space Museum and author.

== Early life and education ==
Passman was born in Cedarhurst, New York, to Ethel and Matthew Passman. He graduated from the University of Michigan with a degree in aeronautical engineering in 1944 and mathematics in 1946. He earned a master's in aeronautical engineering in 1947. He joined the Navy Pilot Training program during WWII, but was discharged for medical reasons.

== Career ==
Passman worked for Bell Aircraft, General Electric, the U.S. Department of Energy, and Grumman Corp.

He worked on the team that created Bell X-1, the first airplane to exceed the speed of sound and served as the Chief Aerodynamicist for Bell X-2, the first plane to break Mach 3. He also worked on the Corona, the spy satellite that informed the U.S. of Russian nuclear power. Passman's work also included the Nimbus weather satellite and the SNAP-27 power system for Apollo missions to the moon. He served as manager of the Manned Orbiting Laboratory project before it was terminated by President Nixon.

He co-authored X-15: The World’s Fastest Rocket Plan and the Pilots who Ushered In the Space Age in 2014. He was named to the Smithsonian National Air and Space Museum Wall of Honor.

== Personal life and death ==
Passman was married to Minna for 70 years. They had three sons and lived in Silver Spring, Maryland, at the time of his death. He died of complications from COVID-19 at Holy Cross Hospital.
