= Volodymyr Korolyuk =

Ukrainian and Soviet mathematician (1925–2020)

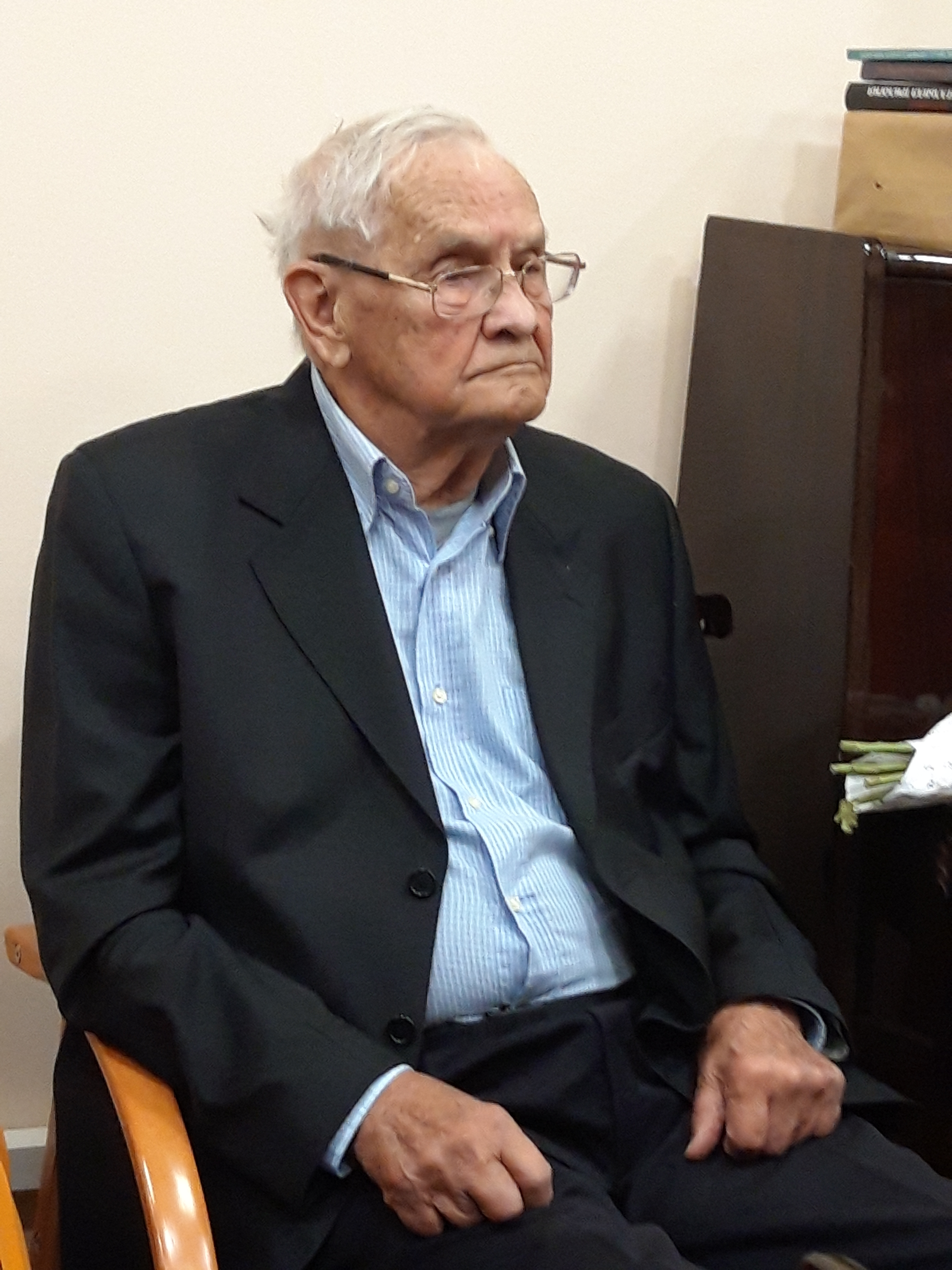
Korolyuk in 2019

Volodymyr Semenovych Korolyuk (Ukrainian: Володимир Семенович Королюк, 19 August 1925 – 4 April 2020) was a Soviet and Ukrainian mathematician who made significant contributions to probability theory and its applications, academician of the National Academy of Sciences of Ukraine (1976).

Korolyuk was born in Kyiv in August 1925. Between 1949 and 2005 Volodymyr Korolyuk published over 300 papers and 22 monographs. He died in Kyiv in April 2020 at the age of 94.

== Awards and honors ==
Volodymyr Korolyuk has been awarded a number of scientific prizes.

- Krylov Prize of the National Academy of Sciences of Ukraine, 1976
- State Prize of the Ukrainian Soviet Socialist Republic, 1978
- Glushkov Prize of the National Academy of Sciences of Ukraine, 1988
- Bogolyubov Prize of the National Academy of Sciences of Ukraine, 1995
- Ostrogradsky Medal, 2002
- State Prize of Ukraine, 2003
