= 1997–98 Melbourne Monarchs season =

7th season for Melbourne Monarchs

1997–98 Melbourne Monarchs
- Minor premiership
- League: Australian Baseball League
- Ballpark: Melbourne Ballpark
- City: Melbourne, Victoria
- Record: 32–20 (.615)
- Place: 1st
- General manager: David Oertle
- Manager: Jon Deeble

The 1997-98 Melbourne Monarchs season was the 7th season for the team. As was the case for the Monarchs's previous seasons they competed in the Australian Baseball League (ABL).

== Regular season ==
=== Standings ===
Pos	Team	Pld	W	L	PCT	GB	Qualification
1	Melbourne Monarchs	52	32	20	.615	—	Advance to Finals Series
2	Sydney Storm	54	32	22	.593	1	Advance to Finals Series
3	Melbourne Reds	51	30	21	.588	1.5	Advance to Finals Series
4	Gold Coast Cougars	53	31	22	.585	1.5	Advance to Finals Series
5	Perth Heat	53	30	23	.566	2.5	
6	Adelaide Giants	53	26	27	.491	6.5	
7	Brisbane Bandits	53	20	33	.377	12.5	
8	Hunter Eagles	53	10	43	.189	22.5	

==== Record vs opponents ====
Opponent	W–L Record	Largest Victory			Largest Defeat			Current Streak
Opponent	W–L Record	Score	Date	Ground	Score	Date	Ground	Current Streak
Adelaide Giants	2-6	3-1	7 November 1997	Norwood Oval	2-7	15 November 1997	Melbourne Ballpark	L1
Brisbane Bandits	4-2	1 Run	Tied (3)		10-15	27 January 1998	Melbourne Ballpark	L1
Gold Coast Cougars	6-1	6-0	28 December 1997	Melbourne Ballpark	3-4	24 January 1998	Carrara Stadium	L1
Hunter Eagles	6-0	9-0	30 January 1998	Melbourne Ballpark	-			W6
Melbourne Reds	6–3	14–4	10 January 1998	Moorabbin Oval	2–8	2 November 1997	Moorabbin Oval	L1
Perth Heat	5-3	7-2	14 December 1997	Melbourne Ballpark	1-6	22 November 1997	WACA	W3
Sydney Storm	3-5	8-4	6 December 1997	Concord Oval	5-18	7 December 1997	Concord Oval	L1
Total	32–20				Sydney Storm			L1
Total	32–20	14–4	10 January 1998	Moorabbin Oval	5–18	7 December 1997	Sydney Showgrounds	L1

=== Game log ===
W	Monarchs win
L	Monarchs loss
T	Monarchs tie
	Game postponed
**Bold**	Monarchs team member

1997-98 Game Log
October

#	Date	Opponent	Score	Win	Loss	Save	Crowd	Record	Ref
1	31 October	@ Reds	8–6					1-0	

November

#	Date	Opponent	Score	Win	Loss	Save	Crowd	Record	Ref
2	1 November (DH 1)	Reds	10–6					2-0	
3	1 November (DH 2)	Reds	7–2					3-0	
4	2 November	@ Reds	2–8					3-1	
5	7 November	@ Giants	3–1					4-1	
6	8 November (DH 1)	@ Giants	0–3					4-2	
7	8 November (DH 2)	@ Giants	4–9					4-3	
8	9 November	@ Giants	4–7					4-4	
9	14 November	Giants	?–?					4-5	
10	15 November (DH 1)	Giants	2–7					4-6	
11	15 November (DH 2)	Giants	?–?					5-6	
12	16 November	Giants	?–?					5-7	
13	21 November	Heat	7–6					6-7	
14	22 November (DH 1)	Heat	1–6					6-8	
15	22 November (DH 2)	Heat	5–9					6-9	
16	23 November	Heat	2–0					7-9	

December

#	Date	Opponent	Score	Win	Loss	Save	Crowd	Record	Ref
17	5 December	@ Storm	2–3					7-10	
18	6 December (DH 1)	@ Storm	5–6					7-11	
19	6 December (DH 2)	@ Storm	8–4					8-11	
20	7 December	@ Storm	5–18					8-12	
21	14 December (DH 1)	@ Heat	9–10					8-13	
22	14 December (DH 2)	@ Heat	7–2	P. Dale				9-13	
23	15 December (DH 1)	@ Heat	3–0	E. Nelsen		**R. Spear**		10-13	
24	15 December (DH 2)	@ Heat	6–4					11-13	
25	19 December	Storm	3–5					11-14	
26	20 December (DH 1)	Storm	6–3					12-14	
27	20 December (DH 2)	Storm	1–0					13-14	
28	21 December	Storm	5–6					13-15	
29	26 December	Cougars	4–1	P. Dale	B. Cederbladd			14-15	
30	27 December (DH 1)	Cougars	2–1	E. Nelson				15-15	
31	27 December (DH 2)	Cougars	4–0	M. Bowie				16-15	
32	28 December	Cougars	6–0	E. Byrne				17-15	

January

#	Date	Opponent	Score	Win	Loss	Save	Crowd	Record	Ref
33	3 January	@ Eagles	8–3					18-15	
34	4 January	@ Eagles	7–5					19-15	
35	5 January	@ Eagles	3–2					20-15	
36	8 January	@ Reds	6–2					21-15	
37	9 January	@ Reds	3–7					21-16	
38	10 January	@ Reds	14-4	**E. Nelson**				22-16	
39	16 January (DH 1)	Bandits	1–2	Williams	**R Spear**			22-17	
40	16 January (DH 2)	Bandits	4–3	**E. Nelson**	Smith			23-17	
41	17 January (DH 1)	Bandits	11–10	**K. Gogos**	Gooda			24-17	
42	17 January (DH 2)	Bandits	12–11	**K. Gogos**	Foxover			25-17	
43	22 January	@ Cougars	10–9					26-17	
44	23 January	@ Cougars	5–1					27-17	
45	24 January	@ Cougars	3–4					27-18	
46	26 January	@ Bandits	–					28-18	
47	27 January	@ Bandits	10–15					28-19	
48	28 January	@ Bandits	**Wash Out**					28-19	
49	30 January	Eagles	9–0					29-19	
50	31 January (DH 1)	Eagles	9–5					30-19	
51	31 January (DH 2)	Eagles	7–6					31-19	

February

#	Date	Opponent	Score	Win	Loss	Save	Crowd	Record	Ref
52	5 February	Reds	5-4					32-19	
53	6 February	Reds	4-5					32-20	
54	7 February	@ Monarchs	**Wash Out**					32-20	

== Postseason ==
=== Finals Series at Melbourne Ballpark ===
In previous years, the post season was played as home and away best of 3 games, with the two winner of each series meeting for a best of 5 series{fact}. In 1997-98, this was changed to a round robin play-off format with each team playing 3 games, 1 against each of the other 3 qualified teams, with the two highest places teams playing off in the Championship Series.

All games for the 9th ABL title were played at the Melbourne Ballpark from February, 10-12 with the best of three championship series February 14–15.

=== Finals Series (Monarchs games) ===
Full series results

==== Game 1: 10 February 1998 ====
Team	1	2	3	4	5	6	7	8	9	R	H	E
Gold Coast Cougars	?	?	?	?	?	?	?	?	?	7	?	?
Melbourne Monarchs	?	?	?	?	?	?	?	?	?	5	?	?
WP: ? (1-0) LP: ? (0-1) Sv: ? Home runs: Cougars: ? Monarchs: ?

==== Game 3: 11 February 1998 ====
Team	1	2	3	4	5	6	7	8	9	R	H	E
Melbourne Monarchs	?	?	?	?	?	?	?	?	?	1	?	?
Sydney Storm	?	?	?	?	?	?	?	?	?	5	?	?
WP: ? (1-0) LP: ? (0-1) Sv: ? Home runs: Monarchs: ? Storm: ?

==== Game 6: 12 February 1998 ====
Team	1	2	3	4	5	6	7	8	9	R	H	E
Melbourne Monarchs	?	?	?	?	?	?	?	?	?	12	?	?
Melbourne Reds	?	?	?	?	?	?	?	?	?	5	?	?
WP: ? (1-0) LP: ? (0-1) Sv: ? Home runs: Monarchs: ? Reds: ?

=== Postseason Ladder ===
Pos	Team	Pld	W	L	RF	RA	RD	PCT	GB	Qualification
1	Melbourne Reds	3	2	1	25	18	+7	.667	—	Advance to Championship series
2	Gold Coast Cougars	3	2	1	16	13	+3	.667	—	Advance to Championship series
3	Melbourne Monarchs	3	1	2	18	17	+1	.333	1	
4	Sydney Storm	3	1	2	16	27	−11	.333	1	

=== Award winners ===
==== ABL awards ====
Award	Name	Stat	ref
Pitcher of the Year	Erick Nelson		

==== All-stars ====
Position	Name	ref
Starting Pitcher	Erick Nelson	

==== Monarchs Awards ====
Award	Name	Stat	ref

== Roster ==
Melbourne Monarchs roster – 1997–98 ABL
Active roster		Coaching Staff
Pitchers Right-handed pitchers: 21 (Australia) John Challinor; 43 (Australia) Phil Dale; 24 (Australia) Jon Deeble; 23 (Australia) Cameron Forbes; 9 (Australia) Keith Gogas; 25 (United States) Cameron Hardy; 18 (Australia) Steven Schram; 8 (Australia) Russel Spear; Left-handed pitchers: 34 (United States) Micah Bowie; 5 (Australia) Earl Byrne; 11 (United States) Erick Nelson	Catchers: 14 (Australia) Brett Caulfield; 28 (Australia) John Edwards; 35 (Australia) Tristen McDonald; 36 (United States) Steve Dax Norris; Infielders: 19 (Australia) Rohan Brasher; 45 (Australia) Clayton Byrne; 10 (Australia) Mark Doubleday; 22 (Australia) Ben Risinger; 7 (Australia) Richard Vagg; 4 (Australia) Jay Willis; Outfielders: 9 (Australia) Keith Gogas; 37 (Australia) Ben Hammer; 33 (Australia) Aaron Harvey; 17 (United States) George Lombard; 16 (Australia) Dean Marnell	Manager: 24 (Australia) Jon Deeble; Coaches: (Australia) Neil Bourke; (Australia) Mike Deeble
Current as of February 1998.
