= 1997–98 Sydney Storm season =

1997–98 Sydney Storm
- League: Australian Baseball League
- Ballpark: Concord Oval
- City: Sydney, New South Wales
- Record: 32–22 (.593)
- Place: 2nd

The 1997–98 Sydney Storm season was the 6th season for the team, but first season known as the Storm. As was the case for the Franchises previous seasons they competed in the Australian Baseball League (ABL).

== Offseason ==
During the offseason the franchise changed its name from the Sydney Blues to the Sydney Storm, This was done as a result of legal action taken by Cricket NSW, Who also used the name Blues for its teams.

== Regular season ==
=== Standings ===
Pos	Team	Pld	W	L	PCT	GB	Qualification
1	Melbourne Monarchs	52	32	20	.615	—	Advance to Finals Series
2	Sydney Storm	54	32	22	.593	1	Advance to Finals Series
3	Melbourne Reds	51	30	21	.588	1.5	Advance to Finals Series
4	Gold Coast Cougars	53	31	22	.585	1.5	Advance to Finals Series
5	Perth Heat	53	30	23	.566	2.5	
6	Adelaide Giants	53	26	27	.491	6.5	
7	Brisbane Bandits	53	20	33	.377	12.5	
8	Hunter Eagles	53	10	43	.189	22.5	

==== Record vs opponents ====
Opponent	W–L Record	Largest Victory			Largest Defeat			Current Streak
Opponent	W–L Record	Score	Date	Ground	Score	Date	Ground	Current Streak
Adelaide Giants	5–3	6–3	Game 16	Norwood Oval	4 Runs (2)			L1
Brisbane Bandits	5–2	23–9	Game 33	Concord Oval	1–6	Game 48	ANZ Stadium	L2
Gold Coast Cougars	1–6	12–7	Game 52	Concord Oval	7–15	17 January 1998	Carrara Oval	W1
Hunter Eagles	9–1	14–3	10 January 1998	Concord Oval	4–6	Game 27	Marathon Stadium	W5
Melbourne Monarchs	5–3	18–5	7 December 1997	Concord Oval	4–8	6 December 1997	Concord Oval	W1
Melbourne Reds	4–2	8–4	5 January 1998	Moorabbin Oval	4–13	1 February 1998	Concord Oval	L1
Perth Heat	3–5	5-1 & 9-5	15 November 1997	WACA	3–10	8 November 1997	Concord Oval	L2
Total	32–22	Brisbane Bandits			Melbourne Reds			W2
Total	32–22	23–9	Game 33	Concord Oval	4–13	1 February 1998	Concord Oval	W2

=== Game log ===
W	Storm win
L	Storm loss
T	Storm tie
	Game postponed
**Bold**	Storm team member

1997-98 Game Log
November

#	Date	Opponent	Score	Win	Loss	Save	Crowd	Record	Ref
1	1 November (DH 1)	Eagles	11–10					1-0	
2	1 November (DH 2)	Eagles	5–3					2-0	
3	2 November (DH 1)	Eagles	**Re-Scheduled**					2-0	
4	2 November (DH 2)	Eagles	**Re-Scheduled**					2-0	
5	7 November (DH 1)	@ Heat	5–3					3-0	
6	7 November (DH 2)	@ Heat	2-3					3-1	
7	8 November (DH 1)	@ Heat	3-10					3-2	
8	8 November (DH 2)	@ Heat	1-4					3-3	
9	15 November (DH 1)	Heat	5-1					4-3	
10	15 November (DH 2)	Heat	9-5					5-3	
11	16 November (DH 1)	Heat	3-4					5-4	
12	16 November (DH 2)	Heat	7-11					5-5	
13		@ Giants	1–5					5-6	
14		@ Giants	3–2					6-6	
15		@ Giants	5–2					7-6	
16		@ Giants	6–3					8-6	
17		Giants	6–5					9-6	
18		Giants	1–4					9-7	
19		Giants	8–7					10-7	
20		Giants	2–6					10-8	

December

#	Date	Opponent	Score	Win	Loss	Save	Crowd	Record	Ref
21	5 December	Monarchs	3-2					11-8	
22	6 December (DH 1)	Monarchs	6-5					12-8	
23	6 December (DH 2)	Monarchs	4-8					12-9	
24	7 December	Monarchs	18-5					13-9	
25		@ Eagles	8–5					14-9	
26		@ Eagles	4–1					15-9	
27		@ Eagles	4–6					15-10	
28		@ Eagles	**Wash Out**					15-10	
29	19 December	@ Monarchs	5-3					16-10	
30	20 December (DH 1)	@ Monarchs	3-6					16-11	
31	20 December (DH 2)	@ Monarchs	0-1					16-12	
32	21 December	@ Monarchs	6–5					17-12	
33		Bandits	23–9					18-12	
34		Bandits	3–2					19-12	
35		Bandits	10–0					20-12	
36		Bandits	10–7					21-12	

January

#	Date	Opponent	Score	Win	Loss	Save	Crowd	Record	Ref
37	3 January	@ Reds	4-1					22-12	
38	4 January	@ Reds	1-10					22-13	
39	5 January	@ Reds	8-4					23-13	
3		Eagles	17-14					24-13	
40	9 January	Eagles	10-3					25-13	
41	10 January	Eagles	14-3					26-13	
42	11 January	Eagles	10-3					27-13	
43	16 January	@ Cougars	12-17					27-14	
44	17 January (DH 2)	@ Cougars	2-7					27-15	
45	17 January (DH 2)	@ Cougars	7-15					27-16	
46	18 January	@ Cougars	8-10					27-17	
47		@ Bandits	3-2					28-17	
48		@ Bandits	1-6					28-18	
49		@ Bandits	1-2					28-19	
50		Cougars	3-9					28-20	
51		Cougars	5-8					28-21	
52		Cougars	12-7					29-21	
53	31 January	Reds	14–11					30-21	

February

#	Date	Opponent	Score	Win	Loss	Save	Crowd	Record	Ref
54	1 February	Reds	4–13					30-22	
55	2 February	Reds	10-9					31-22	
4		Eagles	11-5					32-22	

== Postseason ==
=== Finals Series at Melbourne Ballpark ===
In previous years the post season was played as home and away best of 3 games, with the two winner of each series meeting for a best of 5 series{fact}, in 1997-98 this was changed to a round robin play-off format with each team playing 3 games, 1 against each of the other 3 qualified teams, with the two highest places teams playing off in the Championship Series.

All games for the 9th ABL title were played at the Melbourne Ballpark from February, 10-12 with the best of three championship series February 14–15.

=== Finals Series (Storm games) ===
Full series results

==== Game 2: 10 February 1998 ====
Team	1	2	3	4	5	6	7	8	9	R	H	E
Melbourne Reds	?	?	?	?	?	?	?	?	?	18	?	?
Sydney Storm	?	?	?	?	?	?	?	?	?	5	?	?
WP: ? (1-0) LP: ? (0-1) Sv: ? Home runs: Reds: ? Storm: ?

==== Game 3: 11 February 1998 ====
Team	1	2	3	4	5	6	7	8	9	R	H	E
Melbourne Monarchs	?	?	?	?	?	?	?	?	?	1	?	?
Sydney Storm	?	?	?	?	?	?	?	?	?	5	?	?
WP: ? (1-0) LP: ? (0-1) Sv: ? Home runs: Monarchs: ? Storm: ?

==== Game 5: 12 February 1998 ====
Team	1	2	3	4	5	6	7	8	9	R	H	E
Sydney Storm	?	?	?	?	?	?	?	?	?	6	?	?
Gold Coast Cougars	?	?	?	?	?	?	?	?	?	8	?	?
WP: ? (1-0) LP: ? (0-1) Sv: ? Home runs: Storm: ? Cougars: ?

=== Postseason Ladder ===
Pos	Team	Pld	W	L	RF	RA	RD	PCT	GB	Qualification
1	Melbourne Reds	3	2	1	25	18	+7	.667	—	Advance to Championship series
2	Gold Coast Cougars	3	2	1	16	13	+3	.667	—	Advance to Championship series
3	Melbourne Monarchs	3	1	2	18	17	+1	.333	1	
4	Sydney Storm	3	1	2	16	27	−11	.333	1	

==== ABL awards ====
Award	Name	Stat	ref
Most Valuable Player	Brendan Kingman		
Golden Glove	Glenn Williams		
Batting Award	Brendan Kingman		
Rookie of the Year	Rodney Van Buizen		

==== All-stars ====
Position	Name	ref
Catcher	Gary White	
Designated Hitter	Brendan Kingman	

==== Storm Awards ====
Award	Name	Stat	ref

== Roster ==
Sydney Storm roster – 1997–98 ABL
Active roster
Pitchers Right-handed pitchers: (Australia) Grant Balfour; 27 (Australia) John Boothby; 7 (Australia) Graham Cassel; 28 (Australia) Brent Iddon; Left-handed pitchers: 11 (Australia) Shane Pepper	Catchers: 15 (Australia) Gary White; Infielders: 19 (Australia) Mark Shipley; 43 (Australia) Craig Stone; 4 (Australia) Scott Tunkin; (Australia) Rodney van Buizen; 18 (Australia) Glenn Williams; Outfielders: 3 (Australia) Matt Everingham; 22 (Australia) Brendan Kingman; 23 (Australia) Jeff Maloney; 30 (United States) Will Skett
Current as of February 1998. Incomplete
