= 1997–98 Perth Heat season =

1997–98 Perth Heat
- League: Australian Baseball League
- Ballpark: WACA
- City: Perth, Western Australia
- Record: 30–23 (.566)
- Place: 5th
- General manager: Doug Mateljan

The 1997-98 Perth Heat season was the 9th season for the team. As was the case for the Heat's previous seasons they competed in the Australian Baseball League (ABL).

== Regular season ==
=== Standings ===
Pos	Team	Pld	W	L	PCT	GB	Qualification
1	Melbourne Monarchs	52	32	20	.615	—	Advance to Finals Series
2	Sydney Storm	54	32	22	.593	1	Advance to Finals Series
3	Melbourne Reds	51	30	21	.588	1.5	Advance to Finals Series
4	Gold Coast Cougars	53	31	22	.585	1.5	Advance to Finals Series
5	Perth Heat	53	30	23	.566	2.5	
6	Adelaide Giants	53	26	27	.491	6.5	
7	Brisbane Bandits	53	20	33	.377	12.5	
8	Hunter Eagles	53	10	43	.189	22.5	

==== Record vs opponents ====
Opponent	W–L Record	Largest Victory			Largest Defeat			Current Streak
Opponent	W–L Record	Score	Date	Ground	Score	Date	Ground	Current Streak
Adelaide Giants	6-7	7-2	5 December 1997	Norwood Oval	1-7	5 December 1997	Norwood Oval	L2
Brisbane Bandits	3-3	15-2	5 January 1998	ANZ Stadium	2-18	4 January 1998	ANZ Stadium	W2
Gold Coast Cougars	4-2	8-2	10 January 1998	Carrara Oval	2-19	8 January 1998	Carrara Oval	W1
Hunter Eagles	5-2	17-6	28 January 1998	Marathon Stadium	0-8	19 January 1998	WACA	W4
Melbourne Monarchs	3-5	6-1	22 November 1997	WACA	2-7	14 December 1997	Melbourne Ballpark	L3
Melbourne Reds	4–2	13–6	26 December 1997	WACA	3–8	27 December 1997	WACA	W2
Sydney Storm	5-3	10-3	8 November 1997	WACA	1-5 & 5-9	15 November 1997	Concord Oval	W2
Total	30–23	Brisbane Bandits			Gold Coast Cougars			W1
Total	30–23	15–2	5 January 1998	ANZ Stadium	2-19	8 January 1998	Carrara Oval	W1

=== Game log ===
W	Heat win
L	Heat loss
T	Heat tie
	Game postponed
**Bold**	Heat team member

1997-98 Game Log
October

#	Date	Opponent	Score	Win	Loss	Save	Crowd	Record	Ref
1	31 October (DH 1)	Giants	6–5					1-0	
2	31 October (DH 2)	Giants	6–3					2-0	

November

#	Date	Opponent	Score	Win	Loss	Save	Crowd	Record	Ref
3	1 November (DH 1)	Giants	6–5					3-0	
4	1 November (DH 2)	Giants	2–8					3-1	
5	7 November (DH 1)	Storm	3–5					3-2	
6	7 November (DH 2)	Storm	3–2					4-2	
7	8 November (DH 1)	Storm	10–3					5-2	
8	8 November (DH 2)	Storm	4–1					6-2	
9	15 November (DH 1)	@ Storm	1–5					6-3	
10	15 November (DH 2)	@ Storm	5–9					6-4	
11	16 November (DH 1)	@ Storm	4–3					7-4	
12	16 November (DH 2)	@ Storm	11–7					8-4	
13	21 November	@ Monarchs	6–7					8-5	
14	22 November (DH 1)	@ Monarchs	6–1					9-5	
15	22 November (DH 2)	@ Monarchs	9–5					10-5	
16	23 November	@ Monarchs	0–2					10-6	

December

#	Date	Opponent	Score	Win	Loss	Save	Crowd	Record	Ref
17	5 December (DH 1)	@ Giants	7–2					11-6	
18	5 December (DH 2)	@ Giants	1–7					11-7	
19	6 December (DH 1)	@ Giants	1–5					11-8	
20	6 December (DH 2)	@ Giants	3–6					11-9	
21	14 December (DH 1)	Monarchs	10–9					12-9	
22	14 December (DH 2)	Monarchs	2–7	P. Dale				12-10	
23	15 December (DH 1)	Monarchs	0–3	E. Nelsen		R. Spear		12-11	
24	15 December (DH 2)	Monarchs	4–6					12-12	
25	19 December	Giants	4–2					13-12	
26	20 December (DH 1)	Giants	4-0					14-12	
27	20 December (DH 2)	Giants	2–5					14-13	
28	21 December	Giants	2–6					14-14	
29	26 December (DH 1)	Reds	13–6					15-14	
30	26 December (DH 2)	Reds	1–0					16-14	
31	27 December (DH 1)	Reds	2–3					16-15	
32	27 December (DH 2)	Reds	3–8					16-16	

January

#	Date	Opponent	Score	Win	Loss	Save	Crowd	Record	Ref
33	3 January	@ Bandits	1–11					16-17	
34	4 January	@ Bandits	2–18					16-18	
35	5 January	@ Bandits	15–2					17-18	
36	8 January	@ Cougars	2–19					17-19	
37	9 January	@ Cougars	8–7					18-19	
38	10 January	@ Cougars	8-2					19-19	
39	19 January (DH 1)	Eagles	0–8					19-20	
40	19 January (DH 2)	Eagles	11–6					20-20	
41	20 January (DH 1)	Eagles	6–8					20-21	
42	20 January (DH 2)	Eagles	5–2					21-21	
43	22 January	@ Reds	2–0					22-21	
44	23 January	@ Reds	9–6					23-21	
45	24 January	@ Reds	**Wash Out**					23-21	
46	26 January	@ Eagles	15–5					24-21	
47	27 January	@ Eagles	8–7					25-21	
48	28 January	@ Eagles	17-6					26-21	
49	31 January	Bandits	0–12					26-22	

February

#	Date	Opponent	Score	Win	Loss	Save	Crowd	Record	Ref
50	1 February	Bandits	12–6					27-22	
51	2 February	Bandits	5–1					28-22	
52	5 February	Cougars	6-2					29-22	
53	6 February	Cougars	3-10					29-23	
54	7 February	Cougars	7-4					30-23	

== Postseason ==
=== Finals Series at Melbourne Ballpark ===
In previous years the post season was played as home and away best of 3 games, with the two winner of each series meeting for a best of 5 series{fact}, in 1997-98 this was changed to a round robin play-off format with each team playing 3 games, 1 against each of the other 3 qualified teams, with the two highest places teams playing off in the Championship Series.

All games for the 9th ABL title were played at the Melbourne Ballpark from February, 10–12 with the best of three championship series February 14–15.

Full series results

=== Award winners ===
==== ABL awards ====
Award	Name	Stat	ref
Reliever of the Year	Gabe Molina		

==== All-stars ====
Position	Name	ref
Relief Pitcher	Gabe Molina	

==== Heat Awards ====
Award	Name	Stat	ref

== Roster ==
Perth Heat roster – 1997–98 ABL
Active roster
Pitchers Right-handed pitchers: 17 (England) Simon Eissens; (United States) Gabe Molina; (Australia) Peter Moylan; 10 (Australia) Grant Moyle; (United States) Chad Paronto; 22 (Australia) Shane Tonkin; (Australia) Brett Walters; Left-handed pitchers: (Australia) Fred Lindberg; 15 (Australia) Robert Wells	Catchers: (Australia) Toby Barnett; (Australia) Gavin Edmondson; 42 (Australia) John Moore; 11 (Australia) Michael Toohey; Infielders: 31 (Australia) Clayton Barnes; 20 (Australia) Sean Jones; 25 (Australia) Ben Needle; (Australia) Dean Robertson; Outfielders: (Australia) Mathew Davis; (United States) Johnny Isom; 4 (Australia) Gerard Prosper; (Australia) Shane Smith
Current as of February 1998.
