= 1997–98 Melbourne Reds season =

1997–98 Melbourne Reds
- Claxton Shield champions
- League: Australian Baseball League
- Ballpark: Moorabbin Oval
- City: Melbourne, Victoria
- Record: 30–21 (.588)
- Place: 3rd
- Owner: Geoff Pearce
- General manager: Tony Peek
- Manager: Tom Nieto

The 1997-98 Melbourne Reds season was the eighth season for the team. As was the case for the Red's previous seasons they competed in the Australian Baseball League (ABL).

== Regular season ==
=== Standings ===
Pos	Team	Pld	W	L	PCT	GB	Qualification
1	Melbourne Monarchs	52	32	20	.615	—	Advance to Finals Series
2	Sydney Storm	54	32	22	.593	1	Advance to Finals Series
3	Melbourne Reds	51	30	21	.588	1.5	Advance to Finals Series
4	Gold Coast Cougars	53	31	22	.585	1.5	Advance to Finals Series
5	Perth Heat	53	30	23	.566	2.5	
6	Adelaide Giants	53	26	27	.491	6.5	
7	Brisbane Bandits	53	20	33	.377	12.5	
8	Hunter Eagles	53	10	43	.189	22.5	

==== Record vs opponents ====
Opponent	W–L Record	Largest Victory			Largest Defeat			Current Streak
Opponent	W–L Record	Score	Date	Ground	Score	Date	Ground	Current Streak
Adelaide Giants	5-2	11–2	27 January 1998	Moorabbin Oval	4-5	16 January 1998	Norwood Oval	L1
Brisbane Bandits	7–1	20–7	22 November 1997	ANZ Stadium	7–11	22 November 1997	ANZ Stadium	W7
Gold Coast Cougars	4–3	10–6	7 November 1997	Carrara Oval	3–6	7 November 1997	Carrara Oval	L1
Hunter Eagles	7–1	17–7	19 December 1997	Marathon Stadium	4–5	19 December 1997	Marathon Stadium	W3
Melbourne Monarchs	3–6	8–2	2 November 1997	Moorabbin Oval	4–14	10 January 1998	Moorabbin Oval	W1
Perth Heat	2–4	8–3	27 December 1997	WACA	6–13	26 December 1997	WACA	L2
Sydney Storm	2–4	13–4	1 February 1998	Concord Oval	4–8	5 January 1998	Moorabbin Oval	W1
Total	30–21	Brisbane Bandits			Melbourne Monarchs			W1
Total	30–21	20–7	22 November 1997	ANZ Stadium	4–14	10 January 1998	Moorabbin Oval	W1

=== Game log ===
W	Reds win
L	Reds loss
T	Reds tie
	Game postponed
**Bold**	Reds team member

1997-98 Game Log
October

#	Date	Opponent	Score	Win	Loss	Save	Crowd	Record	Ref
1	31 October	Monarchs	6–8					0-1	

November

#	Date	Opponent	Score	Win	Loss	Save	Crowd	Record	Ref
2	1 November (DH 1)	@ Monarchs	6–10					0-2	
3	1 November (DH 2)	@ Monarchs	2–7					0-3	
4	2 November	Monarchs	8–2					1-3	
5	7 November (DH 1)	@ Cougars	3–6					1-4	
6	7 November (DH 2)	@ Cougars	10–6					2-4	
7	8 November (DH 1)	@ Cougars	4–5					2-5	
8	8 November (DH 2)	@ Cougars	Wash Out					2-5	
9	14 November	Cougars	4–1					3-5	
10	15 November (DH 1)	Cougars	6–2					4-5	
11	15 November (DH 2)	Cougars	3–2					5-5	
12	16 November	Cougars	1–2					5-6	
13	21 November	@ Bandits	7–11					5-7	
14	22 November (DH 1)	@ Bandits	20–7					6-7	
15	22 November (DH 2)	@ Bandits	12–7					7-7	
16	23 November	@ Bandits	12–8					8-7	
17	28 November	Bandits	12–8					9-7	
18	29 November (DH 1)	Bandits	12–1					10-7	
19	29 November (DH 2)	Bandits	11–7					11-7	
20	30 November	Bandits	11–7					12-7	

December

#	Date	Opponent	Score	Win	Loss	Save	Crowd	Record	Ref
21	5 December	Eagles	2–1					13-7	
22	6 December(DH 1)	Eagles	10–6					14-7	
23	6 December (DH 2)	Eagles	7–6					15-7	
24	7 December	Eagles	8–1					16-7	
25	19 December (DH 1)	@ Eagles	4–5					16-8	
26	19 December (DH 2)	@ Eagles	17–7					17-8	
27	21 December (DH 1)	@ Eagles	8–7					18-8	
28	21 December (DH 2)	@ Eagles	7–0					19-8	
29	26 December (DH 1)	@ Heat	6–13					19-9	
30	26 December (DH 2)	@ Heat	0–1					19-10	
31	27 December (DH 1)	@ Heat	3–2					20-10	
32	27 December (DH 2)	@ Heat	8–3					21-10	

January

#	Date	Opponent	Score	Win	Loss	Save	Crowd	Record	Ref
33	3 January	Storm	1–4					21-11	
34	4 January	Storm	10–1					22-11	
35	5 January	Storm	4–8					22-12	
36	8 January	Monarchs	2–6					22-13	
37	9 January	Monarchs	7–3					23-13	
38	10 January	Monarchs	4–14					23-14	
39	16 January (DH 1)	@ Giants	4–5					23-15	
40	16 December (DH 2)	@ Giants	10–6					24-15	
41	17 January (DH 1)	@ Giants	10–8					25-15	
42	17 December (DH 2)	@ Giants	11–10					26-15	
43	22 January	Heat	0–2					26-16	
44	23 January	Heat	6–9					26-17	
45	24 January	Heat	No Result					26-17	
46	26 January	Giants	1–0					27-17	
47	27 January	Giants	11–2					28-17	
48	28 January	Giants	5–6					28-18	
49	31 January	@ Storm	11–14					28-19	

February

#	Date	Opponent	Score	Win	Loss	Save	Crowd	Record	Ref
50	1 February	@ Storm	13–4					29-19	
51	2 February	@ Storm	9–10					29-20	
52	5 February	@ Monarchs	4–5					29-21	
53	6 February	@ Monarchs	5–4					30-21	
54	7 February	@ Monarchs	**Wash Out**					30-21	

== Postseason ==
=== Finals Series at Melbourne Ballpark ===
In previous years the post season was played as home and away best of 3 games, with the two winner of each series meeting for a best of 5 series{fact}, in 1997-98 this was changed to a round robin play-off format with each team playing 3 games, 1 against each of the other 3 qualified teams, with the two highest places teams playing off in the Championship Series.

All games for the 9th ABL title were played at the Melbourne Ballpark from February, 10-12 with the best of three championship series February 14–15.

=== Finals Series (Reds games) ===
Full series results

==== Game 2: 10 February 1998 ====
Team	1	2	3	4	5	6	7	8	9	R	H	E
Melbourne Reds	?	?	?	?	?	?	?	?	?	18	?	?
Sydney Storm	?	?	?	?	?	?	?	?	?	5	?	?
WP: ? (1-0) LP: ? (0-1) Sv: ? Home runs: Reds: ? Storm: ?

==== Game 4: 11 February 1998 ====
Team	1	2	3	4	5	6	7	8	9	R	H	E
Gold Coast Cougars	?	?	?	?	?	?	?	?	?	1	?	?
Melbourne Reds	?	?	?	?	?	?	?	?	?	2	?	?
WP: ? (1-0) LP: ? (0-1) Sv: ? Home runs: Cougars: ? Reds: ?

==== Game 6: 12 February 1998 ====
Team	1	2	3	4	5	6	7	8	9	R	H	E
Melbourne Monarchs	?	?	?	?	?	?	?	?	?	12	?	?
Melbourne Reds	?	?	?	?	?	?	?	?	?	5	?	?
WP: ? (1-0) LP: ? (0-1) Sv: ? Home runs: Monarchs: ? Reds: ?

=== Postseason Ladder ===
Pos	Team	Pld	W	L	RF	RA	RD	PCT	GB	Qualification
1	Melbourne Reds	3	2	1	25	18	+7	.667	—	Advance to Championship series
2	Gold Coast Cougars	3	2	1	16	13	+3	.667	—	Advance to Championship series
3	Melbourne Monarchs	3	1	2	18	17	+1	.333	1	
4	Sydney Storm	3	1	2	16	27	−11	.333	1	

=== Championship Series ===
==== Game 1: 14 February 1998 ====
Team	1	2	3	4	5	6	7	8	9	R	H	E
Gold Coast Cougars	0	0	0	0	0	0	3	0	0	3	?	?
Melbourne Reds	1	0	0	0	2	0	1	0	-	4	?	?
WP: David White (1-0) LP: ? (0-1) Sv: ? Home runs: Cougars: - Reds: Shane Hogan (1)

==== Game 2: 15 February 1998 ====
Team	1	2	3	4	5	6	7	8	9	R	H	E
Melbourne Reds	0	0	0	0	0	1	0	3	0	4	6	?
Gold Coast Cougars	0	0	0	0	0	0	0	0	0	0	?	?
WP: Jason Beverlin (1-0) LP: Paxton Crawford (0-1) Sv: - Home runs: Reds: Shane Hogan (1), Myles Barnden (1); Cougars: -

=== Award winners ===
==== ABL awards ====
Award	Name	Stat	ref
Manager of the Year	Tom Nieto		
All-Star Game Home Run King	Chris Ashby		
Championship Series MVP	Shane Hogan		

==== All-stars ====
Position	Name	ref
1st Base	Adam Burton	
Short Stop	Ben Utting	
Manager	Tom Nieto	

==== Reds Awards ====
Award	Name	Stat	ref
Batting Champion	Adam Burton	.388 (165 At Bats)	
RBI Champion	Adam Burton	55	
Home Run King	Adam Burton	21	
Base Path Pirate	Adam Burton	18 of 19	
Pitching Champion	Pat Ahearne	3.36ERA 3–4, 56.1IP	
Pitching Workhorse	Jason Beverlin	72.1IP 2–4, 6.22	
Strikeout King	Jason Beverlin	67	
Sigh of Relief	David Simpson; David White	2 Saves	

== Roster ==
Melbourne Reds roster – 1997–98 ABL
Active roster		Coaching Staff
Pitchers Right-handed pitchers: 52 (United States) Jason Beverlin; 49 (Australia) Jason Blejwas; 15 (Australia) Michael Crooks; (Australia) Andrew Fennell; 27 (Australia) Matthew Gourlay; 24 (Australia) Lee Hogan; 41 (Australia) Rob Hogan; 37 (Australia) Warren May; 10 (Australia) David Simpson; 29 (United States) Sloan Smith; 28 (Australia) Ben Smith; 36 (Australia) Jarrod Warner; (United States) David White; Left-handed pitchers: 44 (Australia) Ben Donald; (Australia) Ryan Francis; 25 (Australia) Rikki Johnston	Catchers: 34 (Australia) Mark Cater; 8 (Australia) Scott Dawes; 7 (Australia) Andrew Utting; Infielders: 14 (United States) Chris Ashby; 22 (Australia) Myles Barnden; 20 (Australia) Adam Burton; (Australia) Ross Cameron; 16 (Australia) Shane Hogan; 26 (Australia) Jeff Spencer; 30 (Australia) Ben Utting; Outfielders: (Australia) Glynn Kimberley; 35 (Australia) Glen Reeves; 46 (United States) Derek Shumpert; 18 (Australia) Paul Weichard; 19 (Australia) Darren White	Manager: -- (United States) Tom Nieto; Coaches: -- (Australia) David Clarkson; -- (Australia) Gavin Marshall
Current as of February 1998.
