= 1997–98 Australian Baseball League season =

- League: Australian Baseball League
- Sport: Baseball
- Duration: 31 October 1997 – 15 February 1998
- Number of games: 211
- Number of teams: 8

Regular season
- Season MVP: Brendan Kingman (Sydney Storm)

Finals Series
- Venue: Melbourne Ballpark
- Champions: Melbourne Reds (3rd title)
- Runners-up: Gold Coast Cougars

Seasons
- ← 1996–97 1998–99 →

The 1997–98 Australian Baseball League season was the 9th season of the original Australian Baseball League, contested between eight teams representing state and regional capitals: Adelaide Giants, Brisbane Bandits, Gold Coast Cougars, Hunter Eagles, Melbourne Monarchs, Melbourne Reds, Perth Heat and Sydney Storm. The Melbourne Reds became the first three-time champions defeating the Gold Coast Cougars 2 games to 0 in the Championship series, in front of a small home crowd of 600 at the Melbourne Ballpark.

== Teams ==

Each of the 8 teams from the previous season returned, however the Sydney Blues changed their name to the Sydney Storm after legal action taken by Cricket NSW during the offseason.

In the season opening press release, The league called for expressions of interest in a licence to reform the Canberra Bushrangers for the 1998–99 season, The Bushrangers previously folded at the end of the 1994–95 season.

=== Rosters ===
During the regular season each team made use of an active roster of 22–24 men, with a maximum of 4 import players.

- 1997–98 Melbourne Monarchs season#Roster
- 1997–98 Melbourne Reds season#Roster
- 1997–98 Perth Heat season#Roster
- 1997–98 Sydney Storm season#Roster

=== Venues ===
Teams in the ABL
Team	City	State	Stadium	Ref
Adelaide Giants	Adelaide	South Australia	Norwood Oval	
Brisbane Bandits	Brisbane	Queensland	Queensland Sport and Athletics Centre	
Gold Coast Cougars	Gold Coast	Queensland	Carrara Oval	
Hunter Eagles	Newcastle	New South Wales	Newcastle International Sports Centre	
Melbourne Monarchs	Melbourne	Victoria	Melbourne Ballpark	
Melbourne Reds	Melbourne	Victoria	Moorabbin Oval	
Perth Heat	Perth	Western Australia	WACA Ground	
Sydney Storm	Sydney	New South Wales	Concord Oval	

== Regular season ==
=== Round 1: 31 October – 5 November 1997 ===
Round 1
Perth Heat	3	d.	Adelaide Giants	1	(6-5, 6-3, 6-5, 2-8)
Gold Coast Cougars	2	d.	Brisbane Bandits	1	(7-1, 8-6, 13-14)
Melbourne Monarchs	3	d.	Melbourne Reds	1	(8-6, 10-6, 7-2, 2-8)
Sydney Storm	2	d.	Hunter Eagles	0	(11-10, 5-3)

=== Round 2: 7–9 November 1997 ===
Round 2
Perth Heat	3	d.	Sydney Storm	1	(3-5, 3-2, 10-3, 4-1)
Adelaide Giants	3	d.	Melbourne Monarchs	1	(1-3, 3-0, 9-4, 7-4)
Gold Coast Cougars	2	d.	Melbourne Reds	1	(6-3, 6-10, 5-4, W/out)
Brisbane Bandits	3	d.	Hunter Eagles	1	(6-4, 7-4, 4-3, 2-4)

=== Round 3: 14–16 November 1997 ===
Round 3
Perth Heat	2	dr.	Sydney Storm	2	(1-5, 5-9, 4-3, 11-7)
Melbourne Reds	3	d.	Gold Coast Cougars	1	(4-1, 6-2, 3-2, 1-2)
Adelaide Giants	3	d.	Melbourne Monarchs	1	(N/A, 7-2, N/A, N/A)
Brisbane Bandits	3	d.	Hunter Eagles	1	(9-1, 13-11, 12-6, 9-10)

=== Round 4: 21–23 November 1997 ===
Round 4
Perth Heat	2	dr.	Melbourne Monarchs	2	(6-7, 6-1, 9-5, 0-2)
Melbourne Reds	3	d.	Brisbane Bandits	1	(7-11, 20-7, 12-7, 12-9)
Gold Coast Cougars	3	d.	Hunter Eagles	1	(10-5, 0-3, 8-4, 8-1)
Sydney Storm	3	d.	Adelaide Giants	1	(1-5, 3-2, 5-2, 6-3)

=== Round 5: 28–30 November 1997 ===
Round 5
Melbourne Reds	4	d.	Brisbane Bandits	0	(12-8, 12-1, 11-7, 11-7)
Gold Coast Cougars	3	d.	Hunter Eagles	1	(5-2, 0-6, 7-6, 15-3)
Sydney Storm	2	dr.	Adelaide Giants	2	(6-5, 1-4, 8-7, 2-6)

=== Round 6: 5–7 December 1997 ===
Round 6
Melbourne Reds	4	d.	Hunter Eagles	0	(2-1, 10-6, 7-6, 8-1)
Brisbane Bandits	2	d.	Gold Coast Cougars	1	(9-3, 14-9, 10-15)
Sydney Storm	3	d.	Melbourne Monarchs	1	(3-2, 6-5, 4-8, 18-5)
Adelaide Giants	3	d.	Perth Heat	1	(2-7, 7-1, 5-1, 6-3)

=== All Star Games: 12–13 December 1997 ===
1997 Australian Baseball League All-Star Game
- Date: 12-13 December 1997
- Venue: Carrara Oval
- City: Gold Coast

The All-Stars Weekend, was the first series of All-Star exhibition games held by the Australian Baseball League. The games were contested over two nights at Carrara Oval on the Gold Coast, The then home of the Gold Coast Cougars franchise.

The games were played between the Australian All-Stars, USA All-Stars and the 1997 Japanese Industrial League Champions the Mitsubishi Juko Kobe. The Australian and USA All-Star teams were selected from players who were at the time playing in the Australian Baseball League.

==== Game 1: Australian All-Stars vs Mitsubishi Juko Kobe ====
12 December 1997 19:00 at Carrara Oval, Gold Coast
Team	R
Mitsubishi Juko Kobe	?
Australian All-Stars	?

==== Game 2: Australian All-Stars vs USA All-Stars ====
13 December 1997 19:00 at Carrara Oval, Gold Coast
Team	R
USA All-Stars	15
Australian All-Stars	9

=== Round 7: 14–16 December 1997 ===
Round 7
Sydney Storm	2	d.	Hunter Eagles	1	(8-5, 4-1, 4-6)
Gold Coast Cougars	1	d.	Brisbane Bandits	0	(N/A)
Sydney Storm	2	d.	Hunter Eagles	1	(N/A)

=== Round 8: 19–21 December 1997 ===
Round 8
Sydney Storm	2	dr.	Melbourne Monarchs	2	(5-3, 3-6, 0-1, 6-5)
Gold Coast Cougars	3	d.	Brisbane Bandits	0	(8-3, 9-8, 15-8)
Perth Heat	2	dr.	Adelaide Giants	2	(4-2, 4-0, 2-5, 2-6)
Melbourne Reds	3	d.	Hunter Eagles	1	(4-5, 17-7, 8-7, 7-0)

=== Round 9: 26–28 December 1997 ===
Round 9
Perth Heat	2	dr.	Melbourne Reds	2	(13-6, 7-6, 2-3, 3-8)
Sydney Storm	4	d.	Brisbane Bandits	0	(23-9, 3-2, 10-0, 10-7)
Melbourne Monarchs	4	d.	Gold Coast Cougars	0	(4-1, 4-1, 4-0, 6-0)
Adelaide Giants	3	d.	Hunter Eagles	1	(12-4, 1-6, 6-2, 7-3)

=== Round 10: 30 December 1997, 2–6 January 1998 ===
Round 10
Brisbane Bandits	2	d.	Perth Heat	1	(11-1, 18-2, 2-15)
Sydney Storm	2	d.	Melbourne Reds	1	(4-1, 1-10, 8-4)
Gold Coast Cougars	3	d.	Adelaide Giants	0	(8-6, 9-8, 10-9)
Melbourne Monarchs	3	d.	Hunter Eagles	0	(8-3, 7-5, 3-2)
Sydney Storm	1	d.	Hunter Eagles	0	(17-14)

=== Round 11: 9–11 January 1998 ===
Round 11
Sydney Storm	3	d.	Hunter Eagles	0	(10-3, 14-3, 10-3)
Melbourne Monarchs	2	d.	Melbourne Reds	1	(6-2, 3-7, 14-4)
Adelaide Giants	2	d.	Brisbane Bandits	1	(4-2, 4-8, 8-6)
Perth Heat	2	d.	Gold Coast Cougars	1	(2-19, 8-7, 8-2)

=== Round 12: 16–18 January 1998 ===
Round 12
Melbourne Monarchs	3	d.	Brisbane Bandits	1	(1-2, 4-3, 11-10, 12-11)
Gold Coast Cougars	4	d.	Sydney Storm	0	(17-12, 7-2, 15-7, 10-8)
Melbourne Reds	3	d.	Adelaide Giants	1	(4-5, 10-6, 10-8, 11-10)
Perth Heat	2	dr.	Hunter Eagles	2	(0-8, 11-6, 6-8, 5-2)

=== Round 13: 22–25 January 1998 ===
Round 13
Brisbane Bandits	2	d.	Sydney Storm	1	(2-3, 6-1, 2-1)
Melbourne Monarchs	2	d.	Gold Coast Cougars	1	(10-9, 5-1, 3-4)
Adelaide Giants	1	dr.	Hunter Eagles	1	(9-1, 4-5, W/Out)
Perth Heat	2	d.	Melbourne Reds	0	(2-0, 9-6)

=== Round 14: 26–29 January 1998 ===
Round 14
Brisbane Bandits	1	dr.	Melbourne Monarchs	1	(N/A, 15-10)
Melbourne Reds	2	d.	Adelaide Giants	1	(N/A, 11-2, 5-6)
Perth Heat	3	d.	Hunter Eagles	0	(15-5, 8-7, 17-6)
Gold Coast Cougars	2	d.	Sydney Storm	1	(9-3, 8-5, 7-12)

=== Round 15: 30 January – 3 February 1998 ===
Round 15
Perth Heat	2	d.	Brisbane Bandits	1	(0-12, 12-6, 5-1)
Gold Coast Cougars	2	d.	Adelaide Giants	1	(1-4, 9-6, 7-5)
Melbourne Monarchs	3	d.	Hunter Eagles	0	(9-0, 9-5, 7-6)
Sydney Storm	2	d.	Melbourne Reds	1	(14-11, 4-13, 10-9)

=== Round 16: 6–8 February 1998 ===
Round 16
Perth Heat	2	d.	Gold Coast Cougars	1	(6-2, 3-10, 7-4)
Adelaide Giants	2	d.	Brisbane Bandits	1	(13-12, 12-10, 8-9)
Melbourne Monarchs	1	dr.	Melbourne Reds	1	(5-4, 4-5, W/Out)
Sydney Storm	1	d.	Hunter Eagles	0	(11-5)

=== Ladder ===
Pos	Team	Pld	W	L	PCT	GB	Qualification
1	Melbourne Monarchs	52	32	20	.615	—	Advance to Finals Series
2	Sydney Storm	54	32	22	.593	1	Advance to Finals Series
3	Melbourne Reds	51	30	21	.588	1.5	Advance to Finals Series
4	Gold Coast Cougars	53	31	22	.585	1.5	Advance to Finals Series
5	Perth Heat	53	30	23	.566	2.5	
6	Adelaide Giants	53	26	27	.491	6.5	
7	Brisbane Bandits	53	20	33	.377	12.5	
8	Hunter Eagles	53	10	43	.189	22.5	

=== Top 10 Stats ===
Defensive Stats
Name	Wins	Losses	Saves	ERA
Mark Respondek	4	0	0	2.57
Warren May	6	1	1	4.96
Robert Hogan	5	2	0	5.97
Pat Ahearne	3	4	0	3.46
David White	2	4	2	7.79
Jason Beverlin	2	4	0	6.22

Offensive Stars
Name	Avg	HR	RBI
Adam Burton	.388	21	55
Ben Utting	.346	7	34
Myles Barnden	.343	6	28
Chris Ashby	.314	6	18
Jeff Spencer	.306	7	41
Shane Hogan	.298	18	49

== Postseason ==
=== Finals Series at Melbourne Ballpark ===
In previous years the post season was played as home and away best of 3 games, with the two winner of each series meeting for a best of 5 series{fact}, in 1997–98 this was changed to a round robin play-off format with each team playing 3 games, 1 against each of the other 3 qualified teams, with the two highest places teams playing off in the Championship Series.

All games for the 9th ABL title were played at the Melbourne Ballpark from February, 10-12 with the best of three championship series 14–15 February.

=== Finals Series ===
==== Game 1: 10 February 1998 ====
Team	1	2	3	4	5	6	7	8	9	R	H	E
Gold Coast Cougars	?	?	?	?	?	?	?	?	?	7	?	?
Melbourne Monarchs	?	?	?	?	?	?	?	?	?	5	?	?
WP: ? (1-0) LP: ? (0-1) Sv: ? Home runs: Cougars: ? Monarchs: ?

==== Game 2: 10 February 1998 ====
Team	1	2	3	4	5	6	7	8	9	R	H	E
Melbourne Reds	?	?	?	?	?	?	?	?	?	18	?	?
Sydney Storm	?	?	?	?	?	?	?	?	?	5	?	?
WP: ? (1-0) LP: ? (0-1) Sv: ? Home runs: Reds: ? Storm: ?

==== Game 3: 11 February 1998 ====
Team	1	2	3	4	5	6	7	8	9	R	H	E
Melbourne Monarchs	?	?	?	?	?	?	?	?	?	1	?	?
Sydney Storm	?	?	?	?	?	?	?	?	?	5	?	?
WP: ? (1-0) LP: ? (0-1) Sv: ? Home runs: Monarchs: ? Storm: ?

==== Game 4: 11 February 1998 ====
Team	1	2	3	4	5	6	7	8	9	R	H	E
Gold Coast Cougars	?	?	?	?	?	?	?	?	?	1	?	?
Melbourne Reds	?	?	?	?	?	?	?	?	?	2	?	?
WP: ? (1-0) LP: ? (0-1) Sv: ? Home runs: Cougars: ? Reds: ?

==== Game 5: 12 February 1998 ====
Team	1	2	3	4	5	6	7	8	9	R	H	E
Sydney Storm	?	?	?	?	?	?	?	?	?	6	?	?
Gold Coast Cougars	?	?	?	?	?	?	?	?	?	8	?	?
WP: ? (1-0) LP: ? (0-1) Sv: ? Home runs: Storm: ? Cougars: ?

==== Game 6: 12 February 1998 ====
Team	1	2	3	4	5	6	7	8	9	R	H	E
Melbourne Monarchs	?	?	?	?	?	?	?	?	?	12	?	?
Melbourne Reds	?	?	?	?	?	?	?	?	?	5	?	?
WP: ? (1-0) LP: ? (0-1) Sv: ? Home runs: Monarchs: ? Reds: ?

=== Postseason Ladder ===
Pos	Team	Pld	W	L	RF	RA	RD	PCT	GB	Qualification
1	Melbourne Reds	3	2	1	25	18	+7	.667	—	Advance to Championship series
2	Gold Coast Cougars	3	2	1	16	13	+3	.667	—	Advance to Championship series
3	Melbourne Monarchs	3	1	2	18	17	+1	.333	1	
4	Sydney Storm	3	1	2	16	27	−11	.333	1	

=== Championship Series ===
==== Game 1: 14 February 1998 ====
Team	1	2	3	4	5	6	7	8	9	R	H	E
Gold Coast Cougars	0	0	0	0	0	0	3	0	0	3	?	?
Melbourne Reds	1	0	0	0	2	0	1	0	-	4	?	?
WP: David White (1-0) LP: ? (0-1) Sv: ? Home runs: Cougars: - Reds: Shane Hogan (1)

==== Game 2: 15 February 1998 ====
Team	1	2	3	4	5	6	7	8	9	R	H	E
Melbourne Reds	0	0	0	0	0	1	0	3	0	4	6	?
Gold Coast Cougars	0	0	0	0	0	0	0	0	0	0	?	?
WP: Jason Beverlin (1-0) LP: Paxton Crawford (0-1) Sv: - Home runs: Reds: Shane Hogan (1), Myles Barnden (1); Cougars: -

== Awards ==
Award	Person	Team
Batting Champion	Brendan Kingman	Sydney Storm
Golden Glove	Glenn Williams	Sydney Storm
Manager of the Year	Tom Nieto	Melbourne Reds
Most Valuable Player	Brendan Kingman	Sydney Storm
Championship M.V.P.	Shane Hogan	Melbourne Reds
Rookie of the Year	Rodney Van Buizen	Hunter Eagles
Reliever of the Year	Gabe Molina	Perth Heat
Pitcher of the Year	Erick Nelson	Melbourne Monarchs
Umpire of the Year	Gerard Tancred	New South Wales

== All-Star Team ==
Position	Name	Team
Catcher	Gary White	Sydney Storm
1st Base	Ron Johnson	Gold Coast Cougars
2nd Base	Adam Burton	Melbourne Reds
3rd Base	Paul Gorman	Gold Coast Cougars
Short Stop	Ben Utting	Melbourne Reds
Out Field	Glen Barker	Brisbane Bandits
Out Field	Trent Durrington	Gold Coast Cougars
Out Field	Grant McDonald	Brisbane Bandits
Designated Hitter	Brendan Kingman	Sydney Storm
Starting Pitcher	Erick Nelson	Melbourne Monarchs
Relief Pitcher	Gabe Molina	Perth Heat
Manager	Tom Nieto	Melbourne Reds
