= 1998–99 Australian Baseball League season =

- League: Australian Baseball League
- Sport: Baseball
- Duration: 17 October 1998 – 13 February 1999
- Games: 132
- Teams: 8

Regular season
- Season MVP: Adam Burton (Melbourne Reds)

Finals series
- Venue: Sydney Showground Stadium
- Champions: Gold Coast Cougars (1st title)
- Runners-up: Sydney Storm

Seasons
- ← 1997–98 1999–2000 →

The 1998–99 Australian Baseball League season was the 10th season of the original Australian Baseball League, contested between six teams representing state and regional capitals: Adelaide Giants, Gold Coast Cougars, Melbourne Monarchs, Melbourne Reds, Perth Heat and Sydney Storm. The championship was won by the Gold Coast Cougars, who defeated the Sydney Storm in 2 games in the championship series at the Sydney Showground Stadium. The Adelaide Giants finished the season on top of the ladder but were knocked out in Semi-final 1 by the Sydney Storm.

All play-off games in the 1998–99 ABL season were held at the then-recently completed Sydney Showground, which was to become the main venue for baseball at the 2000 Summer Olympics.

1998–99 was the final season of the original Australian Baseball League. At the completion of the season the rights to the league were purchased by Dave Nilsson who then attempted to form the International Baseball League of Australia.

== Teams ==

Only 6 of the 8 teams from the previous season returned, The Hunter Eagles and Brisbane Bandits were both unable to continue in the league due to increasing financial pressure.

=== Rosters ===
During the regular season each team made use of an active roster of 22–24 men, with a maximum of 4 import players.

==== Adelaide Giants ====
Adelaide Giants roster – 1998–99 ABL
Active roster
Pitchers Right-handed pitchers: ? (Australia) Tom Becker; ? (Australia) Shayne Bennett; ? (Australia) John Challinor; ? (Australia) Darren Fidge; ? (United States) Matt Herges; ? (Australia) Graham Ingram; ? (United States) Blake Mayo; ? (Australia) Luke Prokopec; ? (Australia) Jeff Williams; Left-handed pitchers: ? (Australia) Kym Ashworth; ? (Australia) Adrian Burnside	Catchers: ? (Australia) Darren Phillips; ? (Australia) Sam Tibbets; Infielders: ? (Australia) Rick Bennett; ? (Australia) Andrew Brett; ? (Australia) Nathan Davison; ? (Australia) Michael Forbes; ? (Australia) Jason Hewitt; ? (Australia) Andrew Scott; Outfielders: ? (Australia) Jay Ivanoff; ? (Australia) Tony Mota; ? (Australia) Mark Paparella; ? (Australia) Chip Sell; ? (United States) Eric Stuckenschneider; ? (Australia) Andrew Taintley; ? (Australia) Marc Taintley; ? (Australia) Craig Watts
Current as of February 1999.

==== Melbourne Monarchs ====
Melbourne Monarchs roster – 1998–99 ABL
Active roster		Coaching Staff
Pitchers Right-handed pitchers: 43 (Australia) Phil Dale; 34 (United States) Jason Flach; 23 (Australia) Cameron Forbes; 9 (Australia) Keith Gogas; 47 (Australia) Michael Nakamura; 18 (Australia) Steven Schram; Left-handed pitchers: 5 (Australia) Earl Byrne; 45 (Australia) Cameron Cairncross; 11 (United States) Erick Nelson	Catchers: 14 (Australia) Brett Caulfield; 28 (Australia) John Edwards; 36 (United States) Steve Dax Norris; Infielders: 19 (Australia) Rohan Brasher; 10 (Australia) Mark Doubleday; 26 (Australia) Paul Gonzales; 50 (United States) Mike Hessman; 25 (Australia) David Kim; 22 (Australia) Ben Risinger; 4 (Australia) Jay Willis; Outfielders: 37 (Australia) Ben Hammer; 33 (Australia) Aaron Harvey; 16 (Australia) Dean Marnell	Manager: 24 (Australia) Jon Deeble; Coaches: - (Australia) Neil Bourke
Current as of February 1999.

==== Melbourne Reds ====
Melbourne Reds roster – 1998–99 ABL
Active roster
Pitchers Right-handed pitchers: 27 (Australia) Matthew Gourlay; ? (Australia) Ben Mann; 37 (Australia) Warren May; ? (United States) Denis Pujals; ? (Australia) Lucas Van Raake; ? (United States) David White; ? (Australia) Gregg Wiltshire; Left-handed pitchers: ? (United States) John Box; 44 (Australia) Ben Donald; ? (Australia) Matt Ryan	Catchers: 8 (Australia) Scott Dawes; Infielders: 22 (Australia) Myles Barnden; ? (United States) Brian Becker; 20 (Australia) Adam Burton; 16 (Australia) Shane Hogan; 30 (Australia) Ben Utting; Outfielders: ? (Australia) Cameron Hubbard; ? (Australia) Matt Kent; ? (Australia) David McGrady; ? (United States) Matt Quatraro; 26 (Australia) Jeff Spencer; 19 (Australia) Darren White; ? (Australia) Glynn Kimberley; 35 (Australia) Glen Reeves; 46 (United States) Derek Shumpert; 18 (Australia) Paul Weichard
Current as of February 1999.

==== Sydney Storm ====
Sydney Storm roster – 1997–98 ABL
Active roster
Pitchers Right-handed pitchers: ? (Australia) Anthony Brasher; 7 (Australia) Graham Cassel; ? (Canada) Greg Clark; ? (United States) Gary Glover; ? (Australia) Craig Lewis; ? (Australia) Mark Marino; ? (United States) Sean McClellan; ? (Australia) Peter Moylan; ? (Australia) Brian Murphy; ? (Australia) Robbie Taylor; Left-handed pitchers: ? (Australia) Craig Anderson; ? (Canada) Clint Lawrence; 11 (Australia) Shane Pepper	Catchers: ? (United States) D. Tomaszewski; 15 (Australia) Gary White; Infielders: ? (Australia) Matt Buckley; ? (Australia) Greg Morrison; 19 (Australia) Mark Shipley; 43 (Australia) Craig Stone; 4 (Australia) Scott Tunkin; Outfielders: 3 (Australia) Matt Everingham; 22 (Australia) Brendan Kingman; ? (Australia) Ryan Manfield; ? (Australia) Brett Schylder; ? (Australia) Chris Snelling; ? (Australia) Rodney van Buizen; ? (United States) Vernon Wells; 18 (Australia) Glenn Williams
Current as of February 1998. Incomplete

=== Venues ===
Teams in the ABL
Team	City	State	Stadium	Ref
Adelaide Giants	Adelaide	South Australia	Norwood Oval	
Gold Coast Cougars	Gold Coast	Queensland	Carrara Oval	
Melbourne Monarchs	Melbourne	Victoria	Melbourne Ballpark	
Melbourne Reds	Melbourne	Victoria	Moorabbin Oval	
Perth Heat	Perth	Western Australia	Bassendean Oval	
Sydney Storm	Sydney	New South Wales	Sydney Showground Stadium	

== Match results ==
Key
†	Clinched final berth

Regular season standings
Team	W	L	Pct.	GB	Home	Road
Adelaide Giants^{†}	28	17	.622	-	15-9	13–8
Gold Coast Cougars^{†}	24	20	.545	3 1/2	16–10	8–10
Melbourne Monarchs^{†}	22	22	.500	5 1/2	13–8	9–14
Sydney Storm^{†}	21	22	.488	6	13–10	8–12
Melbourne Reds	20	23	.465	7	15–8	5–15
Perth Heat	17	28	.378	11	12–9	5–19

== Top 10 Stats ==
Defensive Stats
Name	Wins	Losses	Saves	ERA
Adrian Meagher	6	1	3	2.97
Brett Cederblad	4	1	0	2.34
Phil Brassington	5	3	0	3.68
Paul Wollin	1	2	1	3.41
Jason Davis	2	3	1	3.60
Aaron Reed	2	2	2	3.89

Offensive Stars
Name	Avg	HR	RBI
Brandon Pollard	.317	12	33
Ron Johnson	.307	5	19
Steve Hinton	.303	1	8
Grant McDonald	.269	5	29
Paul Gorman	.263	7	22
Jose Macias	.267	1	18

== Postseason ==
=== Finals series at Sydney Showground Stadium ===
The 1999 Postseason was held at the newly constructed Sydney Showground Stadium, The Showgrounds Stadium was to be the main venue for Baseball at the Sydney 2000 Olympics.

The Postseason followed a 3-game Semi-final playoff format, 1st vs 4th and 2nd vs 3rd. The winners of the two Semi-finals series then played off in a 3-game Championship series.

==== Semi-final 1: 1st vs 4th ====
===== Game 1: 10 February 1999 =====
Team	1	2	3	4	5	6	7	8	9	R	H	E
Sydney Storm	0	1	0	1	0	0	3	1	1	7	10	2
Adelaide Giants	0	0	0	0	0	1	0	1	0	?	?	?
Starting pitchers: Storm: C. Anderson; Giants: S. Bennett; WP: C. Anderson (1–0) LP: S. Bennett (0–1) Sv: C. Lewis; Home runs: Storm: G. White, C. Snelling; Giants: D. Phillips; Attendance: 1,500

===== Game 2: 10 February 1999 =====
Team	1	2	3	4	5	6	7	8	9	R	H	E
Sydney Storm	0	0	0	2	0	0	0	1	0	3	8	1
Adelaide Giants	0	0	0	0	0	0	0	0	1	1	3	2
Starting pitchers: Storm: G Glover; Giants: M. Herges; WP: G Glover (1–0) LP: M. Herges (0–1) Sv: G. Cassel; Home runs: Storm: - Giants: - Attendance: 1,500

==== Semi-final 2: 2nd vs 3rd ====
===== Game 1: 11 February 1999 =====
Team	1	2	3	4	5	6	7	8	9	R	H	E
Melbourne Monarchs	?	?	?	?	?	?	?	?	?	?	?	?
Gold Coast Cougars	?	?	?	?	?	?	?	?	?	?	?	?
WP: ? (1–0) LP: ? (0–1) Sv: ? Home runs: Monarchs: ? Cougars: ?

===== Game 2: 11 February 1999 =====
Team	1	2	3	4	5	6	7	8	9	R	H	E
Melbourne Monarchs	?	?	?	?	?	?	?	?	?	?	?	?
Gold Coast Cougars	?	?	?	?	?	?	?	?	?	?	?	?
WP: ? (1–0) LP: ? (0–1) Sv: ? Home runs: Monarchs: ? Cougars: ?

=== Championship Series at Sydney Showground Stadium ===
==== Game 1: 12 February 1999 ====
Team	1	2	3	4	5	6	7	8	9	R	H	E
Sydney Storm	5	0	0	0	2	0	0	0	0	7	13	1
Gold Coast Cougars	0	3	1	0	2	0	0	0	2	8	12	1
Starting pitchers: Storm: C. Lawrence; Cougars: K. Calvert; WP: A. Meagher (1–0) LP: G. Cassel (0–1) Sv: nill Home runs: Storm: - Cougars: R. Jonhnson, B. Pollard, P. Gorman; Attendance: 3,120

==== Game 2: 12 February 1999 ====
Team	1	2	3	4	5	6	7	8	9	R	H	E
Sydney Storm	2	0	1	0	2	1	2	0	0	8	13	8
Gold Coast Cougars	1	2	0	1	0	8	2	0	-	14	9	1
Starting pitchers: Storm: C. Lewis; Cougars: P. Brassington; WP: P. Brassington (1–0) LP: S. Pepper (0–1) Sv: nill Home runs: Storm: S. Tunkin, G. White (2); Cougars: S. Hinton, A. Pearce; Attendance: 5,600

== Awards ==
Award	Person	Team
Most Valuable Player	Adam BURTON	Melbourne Reds
Championship M.V.P.	Paul GORMAN	Gold Coast Cougars
Golden Glove	Gary WHITE	Sydney Storm
Batting Champion	Adam BURTON	Melbourne Reds
Pitcher of the Year	Pat Ahearne	Perth Heat
Rookie of the Year	Clinton BALGERA	Perth Heat
Manager of the Year		

== All-Star Team ==
Position	Name	Team
Catcher	Gary WHITE	Sydney Storm
1st Base	Andrew SCOTT	Adelaide Giants
2nd Base	Adam BURTON	Melbourne Reds
3rd Base	Paul GONZALEZ	Melbourne Monarchs
Short Stop	Matt BUCKLEY	Sydney Storm
Out Field	Brandon POLLARD	Gold Coast Cougars
Out Field	Matt Quatraro	Melbourne Reds
Out Field	Chip SELL	Adelaide Giants
Designated Hitter	Craig WATTS	Adelaide Giants
Starting Pitcher	Pat Ahearne	Perth Heat
Relief Pitcher	John CHALLINOR	Adelaide Giants
Manager	Tony HARRIS	Adelaide Giants
