= Brisbane Bandits (1989–1998) =

Information
- League: Australian Baseball League (1989-1999)
- Location: Brisbane
- Ballpark: Brisbane Exhibition Ground
- Founded: 1989–90
- Folded: 1997–98
- Nickname(s): Bandits
- League championships: 1993–94
- Former ballparks: Lang Park(89–90); Brisbane Exhibition Ground(90–94); Queensland Sport and Athletics Centre(94–97); Holloway Field(97–98)
- Colours: Royal Blue, White and Yellow

Current uniforms
Home	Away

The Brisbane Bandits were a foundation team in the Australian Baseball League which was bought by a private owner and shut down in 1999. The Bandits have now been resurrected as a team in the new Australian Baseball League which is due to start in November 2010. The Bandits won the ABL Championship in 1994 and finished 2nd in 1997, going down to the Perth Heat in the championship series. The Bandits only competed in the first 9 ABL Championships, but had intentions of re-joining the ABL Championship in following Seasons.

== History ==
Season	Finish
1989–90	7th
1990–91	7th
1991–92	4th
1992–93	5th
1993–94	1st
1994–95	6th
1995–96	4th
1996–97	2nd
1997–98	7th

The Brisbane Bandits were established in 1989 by co-founders Tom Nicholson and Vince Askey as a privately owned baseball franchise in the inaugural Australian Baseball League. Nicholson ran the entire franchise as the General Manager overseeing all operation of the Bandits. Askey, the Director of International Operations, forged relationships with Major League Clubs, starting with the San Diego Padres and later the New York Yankees. Askey also served as a television commentator for ABL games aired on the ABC Network. Both Askey and Nicholson also served as Directors on the ABL Board of Directors. Foundation Chairman of the Board was well known young business identity Matthew Brannelly who prior to this was the Founding President of the Brisbane Junior Chamber of Commerce.

In their initial season the Bandits were based at Lang Park. The rectangular field was well suited to rugby league and soccer but not baseball. To offset the short left field a 50-foot high wall was installed. In 1990, the team moved to the iconic Brisbane venue, the RNA Showgrounds ( or Brisbane Exhibition ). The lighting and circular field surrounded by historic grandstands provided a family friendly venue and is currently where the Brisbane Bandits in the new Australian Baseball League play. The team maintained this home venue till their championship winning 1993–94 Australian Baseball League season.

In the 1993/94 season the Bandits won the Championship series against the Sydney Blues. The Blues had finished the regular season as minor premiers and had home field advantage. This was not enough though as the Bandits won 2–0 to claim their only title.

From 1994 the Bandits changed homeground to QEII Stadium in the city's south eastern suburbs. This venue was originally built for the 1982 Commonwealth Games.

In the 1995–96 Australian Baseball League season the Bandits finished the regular season as minor premiers. This provided home field advantage for the first week of the playoffs. However they lost to the Waverly Reds.

In their last season, the Bandits played at Holloway Field, the place where the Claxton Shield team, Queensland Rams would play for the next decade. Due to a lack of a suitable venue the Bandits did not compete in the 1998–99 Australian Baseball League season. Many of their players transferred to the nearby franchise, the Gold Coast Cougars, who won the championship that season.

The original Bandits developed at least one Major League player. Cameron Cairncross, a left-handed starting pitcher, went on to play for the Cleveland Indians in 2000 as a relief pitcher.

The Bandits, as all teams in the ABL, had foreign imports each season. At least three of these went on to play in the Majors in the US, including Tim Worrell and Homer Bush of the SD Padres, and Kevin Jordan who played for the Bandits while with the Yankees organization, but ended up play in MLB for the Philadelphia Phillies.

The Bandits were the only franchise in the ABL that maintained the original owners and leadership longer than any of the other ABL franchises.

== Notable players ==
=== Randy Johnson ===
In the 1991–92 season former Atlanta Braves Major Leaguer and Hiroshima Carp player Randy was Player/Manager and led the team in hitting. He was replaced later in the season as Manager by Steve Gilmore. He scouted Australia for the San Diego Padres as well and signed future Major Leaguer Cameron Cairncross off this Bandits team. He also signed Aussies Russell Spear, Ricky Johnston, and Brett Walters to name a few.

=== Kevin Jordan ===
In 1992–93, as an import from the New York Yankees, Jordan won the ABL league MVP and Batting Champion titles. On his return to the States, he was traded to the Philadelphia Phillies where he made his 'Show' debut in 1995.

In 1997 he returned to the Bandits during a stint of rehabilitation from injury. He successfully returned to the 'Show" until his career finished in 2001.

Currently he is a coach with the reformed Brisbane Bandits.

=== Homer Bush ===
Bush was a San Diego Parades draftee when he played for the Bandits in 1993/94 and 1994/95 seasons. In his original season Down Under he won the league MVP and Batting Champion awards. He hit .372 with 1HR and 16RBI.

In 1997 he was traded to the New York Yankees and went on to be a member of the 1998 World Series winning side. His only post season appearances were as a pinch runner. From 1999 till 2002 he played in the majors with the Toronto Blue Jays. In 2002, he finished the season with the Florida Marlins. After battling injury he finished his career playing a further 9 games with the Yankees in 2004. http://www.baseball-almanac.com/players/player.php?p=bushho01

=== Glen Barker ===
It is possible the Glen Barker who played for the Bandits in the 1997/98 season gaining All Star selection as an outfielder. On his return to the USA he was selected by the Houston Astros as a Rule 5 selection, unprotected minor league player.

He has the rare distinction of scoring more runs, 53, than hits (38).

== Award winners ==
1989/90 Season Allstar Team Paul Coogan (OF)

1991/92 Season Allstar Team Steve Gilmore (Mgr)

1992/93 Season League MVP & Batting Champion Kevin Jordan (2nd)

Allstar Team Kevin Jordan (2nd)

1993/94 Season League MVP & Batting Champion Homer Bush (2nd)

Championship Series MVP Leon Glenn

Allstar Team David Nilsson (Catcher) Homer Bush (2nd) Leon Glenn (OF)

1994/95 Season Allstar Team Steve Hinton (SS)

1995/96 Season Golden Glove Steve Hinton (SS)

Batting Champion Adam BURTON

Pitcher of the Year Frankie RODRIGUEZ

Allstar Team Adam BURTON (2nd) Steve Hinton (SS) David Hynes (OF) Grant McDonald (OF) Frankie RODRIGUEZ (P- Starter)

1996/97 Season Allstar Team Paul GONZALEZ (3rd) Grant McDonald (OF)

1997/98 Season Allstar Team Glen Barker (OF) Grant McDonald (OF)

"Future MLB Player"

Phil Stockman. English born but Brisbane raised, Stockman was a listed Bandit in their final season. The then 17 yo had a brief taste of playing professional baseball at home. With the collapse of the ABL he continued his professional career in the US minor league system.

In 2008, he was called up to the Atlanta Braves as a relief pitcher. He was released in 2009 due to ongoing injury concerns. Currently he is playing with the Bandits in the new league. He is hoping the playing time will prove he still has the fitness and ability to return to the Majors.

== See also ==
- Australian Baseball
- Sport in Australia
