= Dave Nilsson =

Australian baseball player (born 1969)

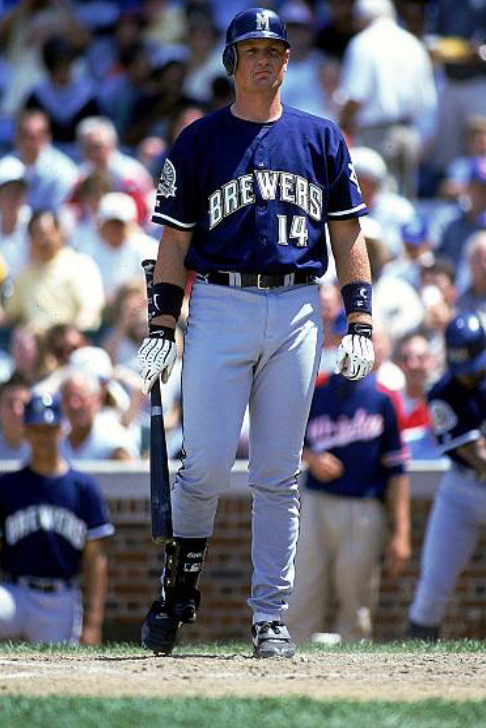
- Nilsson playing for the Brewers
- Catcher / Outfielder / First baseman / Designated hitter
- Born: 14 December 1969 (age 56); Brisbane, Queensland, Australia
- Batted: Left Threw: Right

Professional debut
- MLB: 18 May, 1992, for the Milwaukee Brewers
- NPB: 31 March, 2000, for the Chunichi Dragons

Last appearance
- MLB: 3 October, 1999, for the Milwaukee Brewers
- NPB: 28 July, 2000, for the Chunichi Dragons

MLB statistics
- Batting average: .284
- Home runs: 105
- Runs batted in: 470

NPB statistics
- Batting average: .180
- Home runs: 1
- Runs batted in: 8
- Stats at Baseball Reference

Teams
- Milwaukee Brewers (1992–1999); Chunichi Dragons (2000)

Career highlights and awards
- All-Star (1999); Milwaukee Brewers Wall of Honor

Member of the Australian

Baseball Hall of Fame
- Induction: 2005
Medals
Men's baseball
Representing Australia
Olympic Games
Silver medal – second place	2004 Athens	Team
Intercontinental Cup
Gold medal – first place	1999 Sydney	Team

David Wayne Nilsson AM (born 14 December 1969) is an Australian former professional baseball catcher and current manager of the Australia national baseball team and the Brisbane Bandits. He played for Major League Baseball's Milwaukee Brewers from 1992 to 1999 and was an All-Star in 1999, becoming the first Australian player to appear in an All-Star game. He ended his Major League career on 3 October 1999 with 837 games played, 789 hits, 105 home runs and a .284 career batting average.

Nilsson became a free agent in the offseason following 1999, but opted not to sign with any MLB teams because of his desire to play for Australia in the 2000 Olympics. He was widely applauded for this move as he was turning down big money to represent his country, something very rarely seen in baseball. Before leaving the US, he had been Australia's second-highest-earning sportsman behind Greg Norman, according to the Business Review Weekly.

Nilsson previously played for the Brisbane Bandits and Melbourne Reds in the previous incarnation of the Australian Baseball League where he holds the record for all-time batting average (.351) and all-time slugging average (.661). His brothers Gary, Bob and Ron also played in the competition. He also played in the Japanese NPB and Italian Serie A. He went on to also represent Australia in the 2004 Olympics where they won a historic silver medal, and also represented his country in the inaugural World Baseball Classic in 2006. He spent one season as manager with the Brisbane Bandits during the 2010–11 Australian Baseball League season, before returning to become the incumbent manager since 2014–15. In 2018 he succeeded Jon Deeble as the Australian national baseball team manager.

Nilsson represented Australia at the Olympics in 2000 and 2004, and has been involved in the strategic direction of the sport in Australia.

In 2018, he was named as one of the Queensland Greats by Queensland Premier Annastacia Palaszczuk in a ceremony at the Queensland Art Gallery on 8 June 2018.

Nilsson was made a Member of the Order of Australia (AM) in the 2019 Queen's Birthday Honours in recognition of his "service to baseball as a player, coach and mentor".

== Early life ==
Nilsson was born in Brisbane, Queensland to Australian parents and attended Kedron State High School.

== Playing career ==
=== Minor Leagues ===
Nilsson was signed by the Milwaukee Brewers in January 1987 at the age of 17 as an amateur free agent. He made his professional debut that year with the Helena Brewers, batting .394. Nilsson ranked third in the Pioneer League in batting average but was left off the league All-Star Team at catcher in favor of Frank Colston, who hit .397. Baseball America rated Nilsson the #2 prospect in the league.

In 1988 he made his debut for the Queensland Rams in the Claxton Shield where he won MVP of the tournament. He then went on to play full season A ball for the Beloit Brewers and in the off-season played for the Gold Coast Clippers in the newly formed Australian Baseball League. In 1989 he moved to the affiliate, the Stockton Ports but struggled with the bat and failed to make an impact.

In the 1990 California League season, Nilsson had a significant improvement and helped the Stockton Ports win the title and Baseball America rated him the eighth-best prospect in the league. Back in the ABL, Nilsson batted at .400 with the Daikyo Dolphins, only averaging behind fellow Brewers player John Jaha. Along with brother Bob, he helped Daikyo finish 31–9, best in the league. Nilsson was named to the league All-Star team at catcher and won the MVP Award.

He returned to the US at the age of 22 with the El Paso Diablos in AA batting with an average of .413 and was promoted to the AAA Denver Zephyrs before the end of the season. Nilsson was named as one of the two Texas League All-Star catchers that season alongside Iván Rodríguez. Baseball America named Nilsson the league's #4 prospect after Rodriguez, Royce Clayton and Raúl Mondesí. In the winter he helped Daikyo win the 1991–92 ABL season.

=== Major League ===
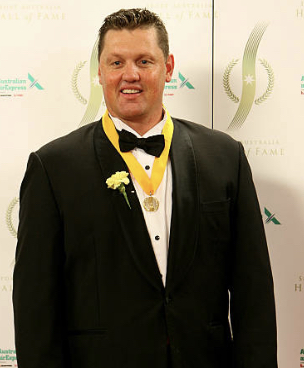
Sport Australia Hall of Fame

After continuing to bat well for Denver in 1992, Nilsson was called up to the Brewers and batted in the 9 hole while playing catcher. Despite striking out in his first at bat, he redeemed himself later that game with a three-run double. Nilsson was one of the ten youngest players in the 1992 American League in his first season.

After performing below par in the 1992–93 ABL season, Nilsson was the most frequently used catcher for the 1993 Brewers, but due to injury problems, had rehab stints in the minors. On 11 April 1994, Nilsson hit the first home run at Rangers Ballpark in the fifth inning of the first game played there. He also grounded into the first double-play recorded at the ballpark, scored 1–6–3. On 14 April 1994, Nilsson and Graeme Lloyd formed the first all-Australian battery in an MLB game.

In the 1994 off-season, Nilsson moved to the Brisbane Bandits and played very well in the regular season averaging .362 and slugging .695. Nilsson homered off his first swing of the season that year. He was named to the league All-Star team at catcher. Milwaukee had originally requested that Nilsson be returned to the team in time for spring training but they later decided to let him stay for the playoffs. He helped Brisbane to an upset win over the Sydney Blues for the championship; he formed a battery with his brother Gary for the final inning of the last round.

Later that year Nilsson had his first full major league season, producing a .275 batting average and .451 slugging average and won Brewers Player of the Year. He then returned to Australia after signing a five-year deal with the Waverly Reds where he played 54 games in the 1994–95 ABL season, leading in batting average (.388), on base average (.471) and slugging average (.775). Nilsson was again named as the All-Star catcher and led Waverly to their second title and Nilsson's third.

Nilsson contracted Ross River Fever while playing winter ball and missed the first two months of the 1995 Major League Baseball season, but after hitting over .400 in three rehab stints, he returned to the Brewers later in the season but was used primarily as a corner outfielder rather than catcher.

Despite being a part-owner of the team, Nilsson came to regret his five-year deal with Waverly as he missed his hometown of Brisbane and tried to negotiate a way out of the contract. The dispute lasted six months with the Reds finally coming to the agreement he would play out the rest of the 1995–96 ABL season before returning to Brisbane. In limited appearances, Nilsson contributed a meager .250 with the bat.

He returned to the MLB late again that season due to a broken foot, but had a productive year by setting his MLB career highs in average (.331) and OBP (.407) while still slugging at .525. He hit 33 doubles and 17 home runs, scored 81 runs and drove in 84 in 123 games. He was 6th in the 1996 AL in batting average. On 17 May 1996, Nilsson became the first Milwaukee Brewer to hit two home runs in the same inning (the 6th, versus Minnesota Twins, in a 12–1 victory).

Nilsson became a player-manager for the Brisbane Bandits for the 1996–97 ABL season. Although knee surgery cut his season short, he guided the team to the finals with a batting average of .420 which, had he played enough games, would have led the ABL that year. He returned to the US where he batted .278 for the season with 20 home runs playing first base, left field and DH. That off season he did not return to the ABL for the first time due to injuries. In the 1998 season he batted at a discouraging .269 mark for the Brewers.

Nilsson was only 29 years old when he played his last major league season, hitting a 309/.400/.554 clip with 21 home runs for the 1999 season. He was also fit enough to play catcher regularly for the club for the first time in five years. In the 1999 All-Star Game, he replaced Mike Lieberthal as the National League catcher, becoming the first (and until being joined by Grant Balfour in 2013, the only) Australian to play in a Major League Baseball All-Star Game. Liam Hendriks has since played in three (2019, 2021, and 2022). Travis Bazzana became the fourth Aussie to make the All-Star Game in 2026.

Nilsson signed a new contract in Japan for the 2000 season so that he would be eligible to play for Australia in the 2000 Summer Olympics. In doing so, the Associated Press estimated that he had given up millions of dollars in earnings.

=== Stardom in international competitions ===
In 1999, Nilsson played in the Intercontinental Cup where he hit a .379/.457/.517 clip to win tournament MVP and help Australia win its first gold medal at an international baseball event. Nilsson was third in average behind Akinori Iwamura and Claudio Liverziani and made the tournament All-Star team at catcher.

Later in 1999 he bought the Australian Baseball League and renamed it the International Baseball League of Australia. In the 2000 Sydney Olympics had his best-ever international tournament averaging .565 and slugging .957 as a DH/1B. He led the Olympics in average that year, 151 points ahead of runner-up Doug Mientkiewicz as well as also leading in both slugging and OBP. Despite his excellent performance, Australia finished just 2–5, ahead of only South Africa.

=== Later years ===
Ahead of the 2003 Major League Baseball season, Nilsson signed a minor league contract with the Boston Red Sox. He ended up retiring before ever playing for them, as according to a Red Sox representative "he lost his desire to play."

Nilsson managed the Queensland Rams in the 2003 Claxton Shield, assisting them to a surprise title. He returned to playing baseball that year for Telemarket Rimini in Serie A1 in Italy, where, although only hitting .280, he ended up slugging at a league high of .920 and had an OBP of .561.

Nilsson played in the Australian season for the first time in five years when he appeared in the 2004 Claxton Shield. He went 5 for 11 with four home runs and 12 RBI and even pitched well in one stint on the mound. He led the 2004 Shield in home runs and RBI and was named to the All-Star team at DH. Nilsson then again attempted a comeback in the major leagues. He signed with the Atlanta Braves and hit .236 in 16 games for the Richmond Braves, five years after he had last played in the Major Leagues.

Nilsson was back with the Australian national baseball team for the 2004 Athens Olympics, and as captain he led the team to the Silver Medal, Australia's first Olympic medal in baseball. He again had a decent tournament performance batting .296/.441/.444 in 8 games. He had a perfect fielding percentage at catcher and threw out 5-of-8 attempted base-stealers.

Nilsson's career ended when he went 0 for 5 with a strikeout for Australia in the 2006 World Baseball Classic. In 2008 Nilsson was named to the Sport Australia Hall of Fame. He entered the Hall of Fame with swimmer Ian Thorpe, Winter Olympics gold medallist Alisa Camplin, rugby league champion Allan Langer, tennis player Mark Woodforde, Australian football and media identity Lou Richards, and swimming coach John Carew.

== Coaching career ==
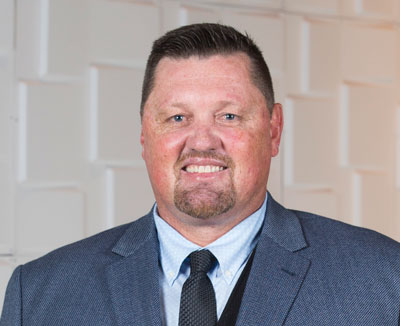
David Nilsson, circa 2018

Nilsson was invited by Brisbane Bandits CEO Mark Ready to manage the team for the 2014 Australian Baseball League season. Nilsson made numerous team and coaching staff changes which saw the team improve in their previous season standings. Nilsson continued to work on improving the culture and teamwork within the Brisbane Bandits throughout the 2015–2016 season, which saw Nilsson take the team to the 2016 post season and swept the Adelaide Bite to take home the Claxton Shield for the first time in the revamped Australian Baseball League .

In 2017 Nilsson coached the Brisbane Bandits to a third-place finish during the regular season. Brisbane went on the beat the Adelaide Bite in the preliminary final and advanced to take on the Minor Premiers the Melbourne Aces in the Championship Series. Nilsson guided the Brisbane Bandits to a series sweep and back to back Australian Baseball League Championships.

Nilsson was the recipient of the Coca-Cola Amatil 2017 Queensland Sport Coach of the Year at the annual Q Sport awards.

In 2018, following three consecutive ABL championships with the Brisbane Bandits, Nilsson was announced as manager of the Australian national baseball team.

In 2021, Nilsson was named as the bench and hitting coach for the Lake Country DockHounds of the American Association of Professional Baseball.

== Personal life ==
Nilsson currently lives in Brisbane and was manager of the Brisbane Bandits of the Australian Baseball League for the 2010–11 season.

Nilsson is currently manager of the Brisbane Bandits (2014–present) and the Australian national baseball team (2018–present).

Dave Nilsson is the uncle of Brisbane Bandits standout Mitch Nilsson.
