= Gold Coast Cougars (disambiguation) =

Gold Coast Cougars may refer to:

- Gold Coast Cougars, a defunct Australian baseball team
- Gold Coast Rollers (NBL), a defunct Australian basketball team formerly known as Gold Coast Cougars
- Gold Coast Rollers (QBL), an Australian basketball club formerly known as Gold Coast Cougars
