= Risinger =

Risinger is a surname. Notable people with the surname include:

- Ben Risinger (born 1977), Australian baseball player
- Dale Risinger (born 1944), American civil engineer and politician
- Earlene Risinger (1927–2008), American baseball player
