= Ben Risinger =

Australian baseball player (born 1977)

Benjamin Risinger (born 25 November 1977 in Perth, Western Australia) is an Australian former professional baseball player.

== Early Career ==
Risinger played for the Australian entry that won Bronze at the 1995 World Junior Baseball Championship. He made his professional debut in the 1995–1996 Australian Baseball League, hitting .265/.321/.286 as a backup infielder for the Perth Heat. The next year he went 0 for 15 with 4 walks for Perth.

In the 1997–1998 season, the right-handed batter batted .244/.351/.358 for the Melbourne Monarchs. Risinger was 9 for 25 with 6 walks, 2 doubles and a home run in the 2000–2001 International Baseball League of Australia season.

== Minor league career ==
Signing with the Springfield Capitals, Risinger helped them to the 1998 Frontier League title as the regular shortstop. He hit .242 and slugged .366. He saw scant action for Melbourne in the winter, going 4 for 15 with 2 doubles and a walk. Moving on to Organized Baseball, the 21-year-old played for the Pittsburgh Pirates organisation in 1999, hitting .249/~.309/.334 for the Hickory Crawdads as their primary third baseman and also seeing time at shortstop, first base and second base.

Pittsburgh traded Risinger to the San Diego Padres for a player to be named later (who became Luis Andújar). In 2000, Ben split time between the Fort Wayne Wizards (.176/.268/.201 in 50 games) and the Rancho Cucamonga Quakes (.260/.345/.460 in 15 games). He played catcher, second base, third base, the outfield and pitched that year, only missing out on shortstop.

In 2001, he played for the Lake Elsinore Storm, producing at a .251/.333/.305 clip in 105 games, playing at least 15 games at shortstop, second base, third base and catcher. Lake Elsinore was co-champion of the California League when the final series was cancelled due to the attack on the World Trade Center on 11 September.

In 2002, Risinger had his best minor league season. Playing for the AA Mobile BayBears, he batted .288/.357/.363 with 26 doubles. He played every position except pitcher, primarily being used at third base (97 games). He just missed the Southern League's top 10 in batting average, falling 4 points shy. He was named to the SL All-Star team as a utility man.

Risinger was primarily a 3B/C in 2003 when he made his AAA debut with the Portland Beavers. He hit .252/.321/.371 in 86 games of action. In 2004, he batted .242/.310/.344 in 79 contests for the Beavers, playing every position except the outfield. The next season, his average fell further as he only eked out a batting line of .211/.369/.336 in 41 games; all he had going for him was that he managed to get hit by pitch 13 times. He cut back on the number of positions played, appearing at catcher, first base and third base. He was not close to the Pacific Coast League lead in times plunked as Carlos Quentin was hit 29 times.

Released by Portland, Risinger signed with the Gary SouthShore RailCats and hit .310. In the postseason, he batted .432 with a team-high 3 home runs and 12 RBI as Gary won the Northern League title.

San Diego re-signed Risinger but he only played one game for Portland in 2006 (going 0 for 3). He was then brought up to San Diego, not as a player, but as the bullpen catcher when Mark Merila was battling a brain tumor.

== National Team career ==
In the 2006 Intercontinental Cup, Risinger put on a fine show hitting .550-.625–1.000 with 6 runs, 3 doubles, 2 home runs and 6 RBI in 7 games at DH. He led the Cup in average but was not included in the All-Star team as Maximiliano De Biase was chosen as the DH. Risinger tied Omar Linares for the third-highest average in an Intercontinental Cup from 1991–2007, trailing only Jeffrey Cranston (.591, 1995) and fellow Australian team member Paul Gonzalez (.571, 1994). Risinger was a RF-DH for Australia in the 2007 Baseball World Cup and hit .346-.485-.423, getting hit by four pitches in 8 games. He only scored one run despite getting on base frequently, but did drive in seven. He had a couple key hits. Against South Korea, he came to bat with two outs in the bottom of the 9th, two outs and Justin Huber aboard.

After falling behind 0–2 in the count, he smacked a 93-mph fastball from Doo-sung Hwang into deep center field to drive in Huber with the winning run. Against Canada, he came to bat with a 5–4 lead in the 9th and Brad Harman and Huber aboard. He delivered a 2-run single off of ex-major leaguer Mike Johnson for a 7–4 lead. The hit became significant when Canada scored twice in the bottom of the 9th. Had Risinger hit into a double play instead of singling, Australia would have lost the game.

In the Beijing 2008 Baseball Qualification Tournament, Risinger hit .267-.290-.400 as the main Australian left fielder. He was 4 for 5 with 3 runs and 4 RBI against Spain but otherwise hit .192 with no RBI in the event. Australia did not make the top three and failed to earn a trip to the 2008 Summer Olympics.

== 2009 World Baseball Classic ==
He participated with Australia in 2009 World Baseball Classic, he played as first base in all team games. Against Mexico, he hit .400 and was 2 for 5 with 2 runs and 3 RBI included a HR.
