= 1996–97 Australian Baseball League season =

The 1996–97 Australian Baseball League Championship was won by the Perth Heat, who defeated the Brisbane Bandits 2 game to 1 in the championship series at ANZ Stadium. The finals series was played in Brisbane even though it was Perth Heats home series, their home ground the WACA was being used for an interstate Sheffield Shield Cricket match.

== Ladder ==
| Team | Played | Wins | Loss | Win % |
|---|---|---|---|---|
| Perth Heat | | 40 | 20 | |
| Brisbane Bandits | | 33 | 27 | |
| Adelaide Giants | | 36 | 23 | |
| Sydney Blues | | 32 | 27 | |
| Gold Coast Cougars | | 31 | 29 | |
| Melbourne Monarchs | | 28 | 29 | |
| Hunter Eagles | | 18 | 40 | |
| Melbourne Reds | 58 | 17 | 41 | .293 |

== Championship series ==
=== Semi Final 1: Game 1: 1st Vs 4th at the WACA ===
| Team | 1 | 2 | 3 | 4 | 5 | 6 | 7 | 8 | 9 | R | H | E |
|---|---|---|---|---|---|---|---|---|---|---|---|---|
| Sydney Blues | ? | ? | ? | ? | ? | ? | ? | ? | ? | ? | ? | ? |
| Perth Heat | ? | ? | ? | ? | ? | ? | ? | ? | ? | ? | ? | ? |
WP: ? (1-0) LP: ? (0-1) Sv: ? Home runs: Blues: ? Heat: ?

=== Semi Final 1: Game 2: 1st Vs 4th at the WACA ===
| Team | 1 | 2 | 3 | 4 | 5 | 6 | 7 | 8 | 9 | R | H | E |
|---|---|---|---|---|---|---|---|---|---|---|---|---|
| Sydney Blues | ? | ? | ? | ? | ? | ? | ? | ? | ? | ? | ? | ? |
| Perth Heat | ? | ? | ? | ? | ? | ? | ? | ? | ? | ? | ? | ? |
WP: ? (1-0) LP: ? (0-1) Sv: ? Home runs: Blues: ? Heat: ?

=== Semi Final 2: Game 1: 2nd Vs 3rd at ANZ Stadium ===
| Team | 1 | 2 | 3 | 4 | 5 | 6 | 7 | 8 | 9 | R | H | E |
|---|---|---|---|---|---|---|---|---|---|---|---|---|
| Adelaide Giants | ? | ? | ? | ? | ? | ? | ? | ? | ? | 1 | ? | ? |
| Brisbane Bandits | ? | ? | ? | ? | ? | ? | ? | ? | ? | 2 | ? | ? |
WP: ? (1-0) LP: ? (0-1) Sv: ? Home runs: Giants: ? Bandits: ?

=== Semi Final 2: Game 2: 2nd Vs 3rd at ANZ Stadium ===
| Team | 1 | 2 | 3 | 4 | 5 | 6 | 7 | 8 | 9 | R | H | E |
|---|---|---|---|---|---|---|---|---|---|---|---|---|
| Adelaide Giants | ? | ? | ? | ? | ? | ? | ? | ? | ? | ? | ? | ? |
| Brisbane Bandits | ? | ? | ? | ? | ? | ? | ? | ? | ? | ? | ? | ? |
WP: ? (1-0) LP: ? (0-1) Sv: ? Home runs: Giants: ? Bandits: ?

=== Final Series: Game 1: Winner Semi Final 1 Vs Winner Semi Final 2 at ANZ Stadium ===
| Team | 1 | 2 | 3 | 4 | 5 | 6 | 7 | 8 | 9 | R | H | E |
|---|---|---|---|---|---|---|---|---|---|---|---|---|
| Brisbane Bandits | ? | ? | ? | ? | ? | ? | ? | ? | ? | 1 | ? | ? |
| Perth Heat | ? | ? | ? | ? | ? | ? | ? | ? | ? | 9 | ? | ? |
WP: ? (1-0) LP: ? (0-1) Sv: ? Home runs: Heat: ? Bandits: ?

=== Final Series: Game 2: Winner Semi Final 1 Vs Winner Semi Final 2 at ANZ Stadium ===
| Team | 1 | 2 | 3 | 4 | 5 | 6 | 7 | 8 | 9 | R | H | E |
|---|---|---|---|---|---|---|---|---|---|---|---|---|
| Perth Heat | ? | ? | ? | ? | ? | ? | ? | ? | ? | 4 | ? | ? |
| Brisbane Bandits | ? | ? | ? | ? | ? | ? | ? | ? | ? | 6 | ? | ? |
WP: ? (1-0) LP: ? (0-1) Sv: ? Home runs: Heat: ? Bandits: ?

=== Final Series: Game 3: Winner Semi Final 1 Vs Winner Semi Final 2 at ANZ Stadium ===
| Team | 1 | 2 | 3 | 4 | 5 | 6 | 7 | 8 | 9 | R | H | E |
|---|---|---|---|---|---|---|---|---|---|---|---|---|
| Brisbane Bandits | ? | ? | ? | ? | ? | ? | ? | ? | ? | 5 | ? | ? |
| Perth Heat | ? | ? | ? | ? | ? | ? | ? | ? | ? | 9 | ? | ? |
WP: ? (1-0) LP: ? (0-1) Sv: ? Home runs: Bandits: ? Heat: ?

== Awards ==
| Award | Person | Team |
|---|---|---|
| Most Valuable Player | Andrew SCOTT | Adelaide Giants |
| Championship M.V.P. | Clayton BYRNE | Perth Heat |
| Golden Glove | Mark SHIPLEY | Sydney Blues |
| Batting Champion | Andrew SCOTT | Adelaide Giants |
| Pitcher of the Year | Kevin MILLWOOD | Melbourne Monarchs |
| Rookie of the Year | Robbie WELLS | Perth Heat |
| Manager of the Year | | |

== Top Stats ==
Defensive Stats
| Name | Wins | Losses | Saves | ERA |
|---|---|---|---|---|
| Robbie WELLS | 6 | 1 | 1 | 2.36 |
| Alvie SHEPHARD | 5 | 0 | 0 | 3.90 |
| David WHITE | 7 | 2 | 0 | 5.47 |
| Mark ETTLES | 3 | 3 | 6 | 3.45 |
| Peter MOYLAN | 5 | 2 | 0 | 6.43 |
| Shane TONKIN | 3 | 3 | 2 | 4.25 |

Offensive Stars
| Name | Avg | HR | RBI |
|---|---|---|---|
| Greg JELKS: .375/11/38 | .375 | 11 | 38 |
| Jason HEWITT | .350 | 3 | 13 |
| Sean JONES | .329 | 12 | 44 |
| Clayton BYRNE | .316 | 15 | 48 |
| Ben NEEDLE | .313 | 4 | 22 |
| John MOORE | .301 | 7 | 33 |

== All-Star Team ==
| Position | Name | Team |
|---|---|---|
| Catcher | Gary WHITE | Sydney Blues |
| 1st Base | Ron JOHNSON | Gold Coast Cougars |
| 2nd Base | Andrew SCOTT | Adelaide Giants |
| 3rd Base | Paul GONZALEZ | Brisbane Bandits |
| Short Stop | Matt BUCKLEY | Gold Coast Cougars |
| Out Field | Clayton BYRNE | Perth Heat |
| Out Field | Brendan KINGMAN | Sydney Blues |
| Out Field | Grant McDONALD | Brisbane Bandits |
| Designated Hitter | Greg JELKS | Perth Heat |
| Starting Pitcher | Kevin MILLWOOD | Melbourne Monarchs |
| Relief Pitcher | Chuck BEALE | Gold Coast Cougars |
| Manager | Tony HARRIS | Adelaide Giants |
