= Melbourne Reds =

- Logo

Information
- League: Australian Baseball League (1989-1999)
- Location: Melbourne
- Ballpark: Moorabbin Oval
- Founded: 1989–90
- Folded: 1999
- Nickname: Reds
- League championships: 1989–90, 1994–95, 1997–98
- 1998–99: 20–23 (5th)
- Former name: Waverley Reds
- Former ballpark: Waverley Park (89–94)
- Colours: Red and White
- Mascot: Redmond
- Manager: Steve Livesey

Current uniforms
Home	Away

The Melbourne Reds were a Victorian-based baseball team in the Australian Baseball League. They were the only team to win the championship 3 times. The Reds originally played at the home of VFL/AFL football, Waverley Park from 1989 until the 1994 Championship, when they moved to the former home ground of the St Kilda Football Club, Moorabbin Oval for the 1994/95 Championship and played there until the end of Australian Baseball League in 1999.

== History ==
=== Birth of the Reds ===
After the 1988 Claxton Shield the idea of an Australian Baseball League was floated, with the Waverley Baseball Club being one of the strongest clubs in Victorian Baseball they stepped forward in instigating a team to represent the south-east of Melbourne, and the Waverley Reds were created.

In the first Australian Baseball League championship the Reds went through the season winning 34 out of 40 games, with a home record of 17 wins 2 losses, the Reds went into the championship series favourites against cross town rival the Melbourne Monarchs winning 3 out of the 4-game series to become the inaugural Australian Baseball League Champions.

The Waverley Baseball Club were the original majority owners and managers of the team, until it was foreseen that ownership of the team was not going to be a profitable exercise and distanced themselves to avoid future debts affecting the future of the baseball club.

=== After Waverley ===
In 1993, shortly after the owners’ departure, the young and ambitious American, Andy Karetsky, bought the team. Karetsky owned and operated the Reds, determined to lead them to victory.

Karetsky was a trailblazer for Australian baseball. He brought his US baseball knowledge and innovative thinking to Waverley. Under Karetsky’s leadership the team achieved the 1994-1995 Championship title and a 2nd place finish in the 1995-1996 season. Towards the end of the “Karetsky Era”, the Australian Football League did not renew the Reds’ lease of Waverley Park. Thus, the team moved to Moorabbin Oval where they adopted their new name: 'The Melbourne Reds'. After 3 highly successful seasons, Karetsky sold his ownership of the Reds and returned to the US.

=== Decline of the ABL ===
After Karetsky, local baseball junkie and businessman Geoff Pearce purchased the majority ownership of the Reds, leading into the most difficult time of the ABL. Dwindling crowd numbers, severe lack of media attention and the ever-shrinking budget of the club took away a lot of the early excitement and entertainment from the Reds games. However, with all these factors Pearce lead the club to its last hurrah in the 1997/98 Championship, becoming the only team to win the ABL competition 3 times.

Late into the 1998–99 Australian Baseball League championship, the Reds were in the process of making a deal with ACES Sporting Club in Keysborough to convert their golf driving range into a light baseball diamond with grandstand to be the home of the Reds, however with the Australian Baseball League collapse after the 1999 Championship this deal never went ahead, however the Sporting Club entered into a sponsorship with the successor Victorian team after the ABL, the Victoria Aces as naming rights sponsors of the team.

== Seasons ==
Season	Finish
1989–90	1st
1990–91	4th
1991–92	3rd
1992–93	4th
1993–94	6th
1994–95	1st
1995–96	2nd
1996–97	8th
1997–98	1st
1998–99	5th

The Reds were one of the most successful team in ABL history, having won the Championship title 3 times.

=== 1989–90 ===
Wins	Loss	Win %	Home	Manager:	Phil Dale
34	6	.850	17–2	US Affiliate:	Cincinnati Reds

Award	Name	Stats	Award	Name	Stats
Batting Champion	David Clarkson	.444 (126 At Bats)	Pitching Champion	Phil Dale	1.44ERA (9–2, 81.1IP)
RBI Champion	Ron Carothers	41 (161 At Bats)	Pitching Workhorse	Carl Grovom	82.1IP (7–0, 2.73)
Home Run King	Ron Carothers	6	Strikeout King	Carl Grovom	70
Base Path Pirate	Mark Linger	13 of 16	Sigh of Relief	Mark Respondek	4 Saves

The first season of ABL play the Reds burst out of the blocks winning 34 out of the 40 games, only losing 2 games at home. The Reds played off with cross-town rivals, the Melbourne Monarchs, winning 3 out of the 4 play-off games to take out the Inaugural ABL championship.

=== 1990–91 ===
Wins	Loss	Win %	Home	Manager:	Phil Dale
20	18	.526	10–10	US Affiliate:	Cincinnati Reds

Award	Name	Stats	Award	Name	Stats
Batting Champion	David Clarkson	.370 (127 At Bats)	Pitching Champion	Mike Anderson	2.58ERA (6–1)
RBI Champion	Ron Carothers	33 (149 At Bats)	Pitching Workhorse	Phil Dale	68.0IP (7–3, 3.18ERA)
Home Run King	Ron Carothers	10	Strikeout King	Mike Anderson	48
Base Path Pirate	Pete Beeler	6 of 7	Sigh of Relief	Dave McAuliffe	3 Saves, 5.76ERA

=== 1991–92 ===
Wins	Loss	Win %	Home	Manager:	Phil Dale
27	19	.586	16–8	US Affiliate:	Atlanta Braves

Award	Name	Stats	Award	Name	Stats
Batting Champion	Jon Deeble	.323 (130 At Bats)	Pitching Champion	Phil Dale	2.12ERA (7–3, 89.1IP)
RBI Champion	R. Carothers & David Clarkson	33	Pitching Workhorse	Scott Ryder	92.1IP (8–3, 3.80)
Home Run King	Ron Carothers	7	Strikeout King	Scott Ryder	71
Base Path Pirate	Brian Kowitz Kevin O’Connor	(26 of 30) (20 of 22)	Sigh of Relief	Mark Respondek	3 Saves (2.93)

=== 1992–93 ===
Wins	Loss	Win %	Home	Manager:	Phil Dale
26	21	.553	14–10	US Affiliate:	Atlanta Braves

Award	Name	Stats	Award	Name	Stats
Batting Champion	M. Sheldon-Collins	.306 (173AB)	Pitching Champion	Carlos Reyes	2.02ERA (9–1)
RBI Champion	David Clarkson	24 (137 At Bats)	Pitching Workhorse	Carlos Reyes	98.0IP
Home Run King	D. Clarkson & Andrew Spencer	4	Strikeout King	Carlos Reyes	74
Base Path Pirate	Glenn Reeves	11 of 11	Sigh of Relief	Phil Dale	7 Saves (2.47ERA)

=== 1993–94 ===
Wins	Loss	Win %	Home	Manager:	Phil Dale
22	31	.415	10–15	US Affiliate:	Atlanta Braves

Award	Name	Stats	Award	Name	Stats
Batting Champion	Aaron Harvey	.284 (183 At Bats)	Pitching Champion	Phil Dale	2.72ERA (4–5, 56.1IP)
RBI Champion	Andrew Spencer	28 (146 At Bats)	Pitching Workhorse	Simon Sheldon-Collins	71.1IP
Home Run King	Andrew Spencer	7	Strikeout King	Simon Sheldon-Collins	50
Base Path Pirate	Aaron Harvey	17 of 22	Sigh of Relief	Phil Dale	5 Saves (2.72ERA)

=== 1994–95 ===
Wins	Loss	Win %	Home	Manager:	Paul Runge
44	14	.750	19–7	US Affiliate:	Atlanta Braves

Award	Name	Stats	Award	Name	Stats
Batting Champion	David Nilsson	.388 (160 At Bats)	Pitching Champion	Phil Dale Dirk Blair	2.76ERA (12–2, 101.0IP) 3.21ERA (13–2)
RBI Champion	David Nilsson	56	Pitching Workhorse	Phil Dale	101.0IP
Home Run King	David Nilsson	16	Strikeout King	Phil Dale	75
Base Path Pirate	Adam Burton	22 of 29	Sigh of Relief	Brendan Ratcliffe	2 SV, 2.56ERA

In their first season at Morrabbin Oval the Reds, with many new faces (most notably, Australian Major League superstar David Nilsson), the reds won 44 of the 58 games. Facing the 4th-placed Sydney Blues in the "Best of 3" Semi-Finals, the Reds defeated the Blues 5–1 in Game 1, and then 7–4 in Game 2, allowing the Reds to qualify for the Championship Series against Perth Heat. The Reds defeated Heat 5–1 in game 1, and then 4–2 in game 2 of the series to win their second ABL Championship.

=== 1995–96 ===
Wins	Loss	Win %	Home	Manager:	Jim Saul
27	21	.553	11–13	US Affiliate:	Atlanta Braves

Award	Name	Stats	Award	Name	Stats
Batting Champion	Greg Jelks	.364 (55 At Bats)	Pitching Champion	S. Sheldon-Collins	3.40ERA (7–4)
RBI Champion	Myles Barnden & D. Clarkson	23	Pitching Workhorse	Simon Sheldon-Collins	76.2IP
Home Run King	Myles Barnden	6	Strikeout King	Damian Moss	58 (3.72ERA, 67.2IP)
Base Path Pirate	Aaron Harvey	21 of 24	Sigh of Relief	Phil Dale	3 Saves (4.46ERA)

=== 1996–97 ===
Wins	Loss	Win %	Home	Manager:	Tom Nieto
17	41	.293	14–16	US Affiliate:	New York Yankees

Award	Name	Stats	Award	Name	Stats
Batting Champion	Myles Barnden	.299 (177 At Bats)	Pitching Champion	Greg Resz	2.27ERA (4–4, 43.2IP)
RBI Champion	Myles Barnden	32	Pitching Workhorse	Warren May	53.2IP (4.53ERA)
Home Run King	Myles Barnden	8	Strikeout King	Greg Resz & Ben Ford	31
Base Path Pirate	Ben Utting	9 of 12	Sigh of Relief	Heath Martin	19 Appearances

=== 1997–98 ===
Wins	Loss	Win %	Home	Manager:	Tom Nieto
30	21	.588	16–9	US Affiliate:	New York Yankees

Award	Name	Stats	Award	Name	Stats
Batting Champion	Adam Burton	.388 (165 At Bats)	Pitching Champion	Pat Ahearne	3.36ERA 3–4, 56.1IP
RBI Champion	Adam Burton	55	Pitching Workhorse	Jason Beverlin	72.1IP 2–4, 6.22
Home Run King	Adam Burton	21	Strikeout King	Jason Beverlin	67
Base Path Pirate	Adam Burton	18 of 19	Sigh of Relief	D. Simpson & D. White	2 Saves

After finishing last in the previous Championship the reds were looking for redemption. The Reds finished in the top 4 to qualify for the "3-day Round Robin Series" to be played at the Melbourne Ballpark. Facing the Sydney Storm on Day 1, the Reds easily accounted for the Storm 18–5. Day 2 saw the Reds win a tight game against the Gold Coast Cougars winning 2–1. Day 3 the Reds faced off with cross-town rival Melbourne Monarchs in a dead rubber, the Monarchs winning 12–5. The Reds then played off with the Gold Coast Cougars, which saw the Reds run out winners 4–3 in game 1, and then 4–0 in game 2, to become the only team to take out the Australian Baseball League Championship 3 times.

=== 1998–99 ===
Wins	Loss	Win %	Home	Manager:	Steve Livesey
20	23	.465	15–8	US Affiliate:	Tampa Bay Devil Rays

Award	Name	Stats	Award	Name	Stats
Batting Champion	Adam Burton	.372 (148 At Bats)	Pitching Champion	David White	4.41ERA (7–4)
RBI Champion	Adam Burton	40	Pitching Workhorse	David White	81.2IP
Home Run King	Adam Burton	14	Strikeout King	David White	57
Base Path Pirate	Adam Burton & Matt Quatraro	6	Sigh of Relief	Matthew Gourlay	4 Saves

== Uniform ==
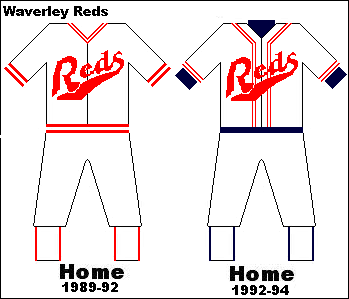

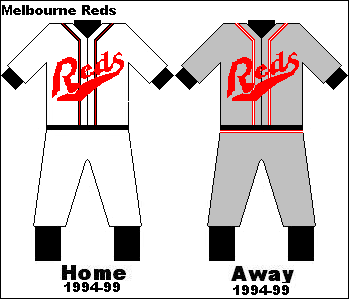

Waverley white with red trim top with "Reds" across the front, Red undershirt, white pants with red double strip down the leg, white socks with red t-bars.

Melbourne Home – white with red trim top with "Reds" across the front, navy blue undershirt, white pants with red strip down the leg, white socks with red t-bars. Away – same as home but with grey where white is.

== See also ==
- List of Waverley/Melbourne Reds players
