= Brendan Kingman =

Australian professional baseball player and coach

Sydney Blue Sox
- Infielder
- Born: 22 May 1973 (age 53); Sydney, Australia
- Bats: Right Throws: Right
- Stats at Baseball Reference

Member of the Australian

Baseball Hall of Fame
- Induction: 2014
Medals
Men's baseball
Representing Australia
Olympics
| Silver medal – second place | Athens 2004 | Team competition |

Brendan Kingman (born 22 May 1973) is an Australian former baseball player and coach for the Sydney Blue Sox of the Australian Baseball League.

== Playing career ==
Kingman was one of the most respected and prolific power hitters in Australia in the 90s and 2000s. He still holds the record as the longest serving Australian Baseball representative.

His career in baseball started at age 6 when asked to participate in a tee-ball game, and he hit a home run in his first at-bat.

Kingman was a part of every representative team in Australia throughout the rest of his playing career.

=== Career highlights ===
- 1998 - Australia's only Triple Crown winner 1998 Sydney Storm of the Australian Baseball League
- 2004 Olympics - Hit in the only run against Daisuke Matsuzaka to win the semi-final against Japan
- As of 2012, Kingman was two home runs from breaking the Australian home run record.

=== 1991–1995: Marlins and Australia ===
Kingman's professional career in Australia began in 1991. A year later, he joined the Florida Marlins and hit .281/~.450/.294 as a third baseman and DH for the GCL Marlins. With the same club in 1993, Kingman batted .261/~.383/.421 as a corner infielder. He hit .319/574/.670 in the 1993–1994 Australian Baseball League with a league-leading 17 home runs for the Sydney Blues. He made the All-Star team at third base; fellow All-Star infielders Homer Bush and Greg Jelks would play or had played in the major leagues.

Moving into full-season ball, Kingman batted .263/.342/.372 for the Kane County Cougars. With Kevin Millar at first base, Kingman played primarily DH. Kingman moved up to the Brevard County Manatees in 1995 and hit .289~.368/.421. Now a full-time DH, his 9 home runs were second on the club to Millar.

=== 1995–1998: Australia's successful power hitter ===
The Marlins let Kingman go after the 1995 season. In 1995–1996, Brendan hit .292/?/.528 to help Sydney to an ABL title. In the 1996–1997 season, Kingman hit .325/?/.716 for the Blues and was selected as an All-Star outfielder. He led the league in slugging percentage and home runs (21). His 62 RBI were one behind league leader Ronny Johnson. He was 7 for 26 with a homer as the primary Australian RF in the 1997 Intercontinental Cup when the country won its first Medal (a Bronze) in a worldwide event.

Kingman's career really took off in 1997–1998 when he broke every ABL record in the Triple Crown categories with a .487 average, 28 home runs and 66 RBI (tied for the lead). He led in slugging with a record 1.083 mark, 174 total bases in 156 AB. The closest player in the batting title race was Adam Burton, 99 points behind, with Jelks 108 points back. Kingman shattered John Jaha's batting average record in the ABL by 43 points. He was both the All-Star DH and MVP that year. It earned him a return ticket to Organized Baseball as the Seattle Mariners signed him.

=== 1998–2002: Back in the US and international competition ===
Kingman's return to the US was an impressive one. He batted .340/~.393/.524 for the Lancaster Jethawks. He won the California League batting title, beating out Jarrod Patterson, for his second batting crown in the span of a year. He scored 91 runs, hit 30 doubles and 16 home runs. He also hit into the most double plays (20). Kingman was named the All-Star DH in the California League that year.

In 1999, he moved up to AA with the New Haven Ravens. He led Eastern League first basemen in fielding percentage (.993) and hit .279/~.314/.377. After 11 games with New Haven in 2000 (.282/.317/.359), he moved to the independent leagues. Kingman hit .280/.387/.480 for Australia in the 1999 Intercontinental Cup, the first international event in which they won a gold medal. Australia faced Cuba in the Final of the Intercontinental cup and in the top of the 9th inning the scores were locked at 5–5, with one out Kingman hit a double to the left field fence and was replaced by a pinch runner, this runner was consequently knocked in by a single by Gary White. Grant Balfour was credited with the save in the bottom of the 9th after closing down the formidable Cuba line-up, the final out recorded with a K2.

Kingman hit .238/?/.262 in limited action for the 2000 Catskill Cougars. In 2001, Kingman batted .278/?/.416 as a 3B/1B for the Bridgeport Bluefish. His 74 runs tied for the team lead. During the 2001 Baseball World Cup, he hit .262/.241/.250 as the Australian 1B. In 2002, he returned to Bridgeport and hit .234/?/.332 in his last season in the US.

=== 2003–2008: Claxton Shield and many international tournaments ===
In 2003, Kingman hit 3 home runs for the New South Wales Patriots, tying for the lead in the Claxton Shield for his 4th home run crown in Australia. He was named to the All-Star team at third base.

The first baseman for Australia in the 2004 Olympics, he hit .282/.344/.370 and 1 home run for the silver medalists. In the semifinals, Kingman's single to right against Daisuke Matsuzaka scored Brett Roneberg with the lone run of the semifinals, impressing the favoured Japanese team and handing Chris Oxspring the win.

Kingman produced at a .429/.500/.476 clip in the 2005 Baseball World Cup, finishing fifth in the tournament in batting average. Kingman was 1 for 5 with 2 strikeouts and an RBI for Australia in the 2006 World Baseball Classic, playing one game at third instead of Glenn Williams and pinch-hitting once for Dave Nilsson. He hit .250/.333/.333 in the 2006 Intercontinental Cup. Kingman even pitched three scoreless innings.

Kingman was back for the 2008 Final Olympic Qualification Tournament, going 6 for 15 with a walk, 2 doubles and 6 RBI while splitting first base duties with Williams. Australia went 4–3 in the tournament and failed to earn a spot in the 2008 Olympics

Kingman's battle with injuries has forced him into a temporary premature involuntary retirement from representative baseball following the 2008 Claxton Shield.

He continued to play Sydney Major League with the Canterbury Bankstown Vikings and Petersham of the Sydney Winter League.

In 2005, Kingman coached the Under 16s NSW Squad at the National Championships in Mount Gambier, leading them to a first-place finish.

== Sydney Blue Sox ==
In the Sydney Blue Sox inaugural Australian Baseball League season, Kingman played four games going 5 for 11.

Since the 2010–11 Australian Baseball League season, Brendan has been a coach with the Blue Sox.

Kingman did not play again until he was activated as a pitcher at the age of 44 at the end of the 2017–18 Australian Baseball League season where he pitched the final inning in relief, retiring all three batters he faced.

== Personal life ==
Kingman is married with three children.
