= Sydney Storm =

- [[File: |frameless|class=pageimage|alt=]] Logo

Information
- League: Australian Baseball League (1989-1999)
- Location: Sydney
- Ballpark: Sydney Showground (Sydney Olympic Park)
- Founded: 1992-93
- Folded: 1999
- Nickname(s): Storm
- League championships: 1995-96
- 1998-99: 21-22 (4th)
- Lost championship series to Gold Coast Cougars
- Former name(s): Sydney Blues (92-96)
- Former ballparks: Concord Oval (as Storm) Parramatta Stadium, Sydney Showground (Moore Park) (as Blues)
- Colours: Black, Purple and White

Current uniforms
Storm Home	Blues Home

The Sydney Storm, originally Sydney Blues were a team in the now defunct Australian Baseball League. The franchise featured in every post season throughout its existence and won the Claxton Shield once.

== History ==
The Storm were formed for the 1992-93 ABL Championship as the Sydney Blues after purchasing the licence of the Parramatta Patriots. After legal action taken by Cricket NSW, the team was re-branded as Sydney Storm for the 1997-98 season, as the NSW Cricket team was also known as the Blues.

The franchise won one ABL championship under their former name, defeating the Melbourne Reds in the 1995 championship, also finishing runner-up twice - once (as the Blues) against the Brisbane Bandits in 1994, and in the final ABL season in 1999, defeated by the Gold Coast Cougars.

Season	Finish
1992-93	3rd
1993-94	2nd
1994-95	4th
1995-96	1st
1996-97	4th
1997-98	4th
1998-99	2nd

== See also ==
- Sport in Australia
- Australian Baseball
- Australian Baseball League (1989-1999)
