= Hunter Eagles =

Australian Baseball League team

Information
- League: Australian Baseball League (1989–1999)
- Location: Newcastle, New South Wales
- Ballpark: Marathon Stadium, Maitland Showground
- Founded: 1994
- Folded: 1998
- Nickname(s): Eagles
- League championships: 0
- 1997–98: 10–43 (8th)
- Former ballparks: Marathon Stadium (1994–1996) Maitland Showground (1997-1998)
- Colours: Royal Blue, Red and White

Current uniforms
| Home | Away |

The Hunter Eagles were formed for the 1994–95 Australian Baseball League season after purchasing the Sydney Wave's licence, who had left the league two seasons earlier. The Eagles played in the ABL until the 1997–98 Australian Baseball League season, and did not have sufficient funds to remain in operation.

A ~1998 proposal to redevelop the Cardiff Sports Centre in Ada St, Cardiff never came to fruition.

The Hunter Eagles expected to return to ABL competition after the completion of the new Gosford stadium in 1999, but with the collapse of the ABL it did not eventuate.

== History ==
| Season | Finish |
|---|---|
| 1994–95 | 9th |
| 1995–96 | 8th |
| 1996–97 | 7th |
| 1997–98 | 8th |

== See also ==
- Sport in Australia
- Australian Baseball
- Australian Baseball League (1989–1999)

== Sources ==
- Article title
