= Melbourne Ballpark =

Baseball park in Altona, Victoria, Australia

- The Stadium
- Interactive map of Melbourne Ballpark
- Former names: Altona Stadium
- Location: Merton Street, Altona, Victoria
- Coordinates: 37°51′36″S 144°46′50″E
- Owner: State Government of Victoria
- Capacity: 5,000 (2,200 seated)
- Surface: Astroturf infield (1990–2012); Synthetic infield (2012–); Grass outfield
- Field size: Original: Left Field - 330 feet (101 m); Left-Center - 378 feet (115 m); Center Field - 390 feet (119 m); Right-Center - 378 feet (115 m); Right Field - 330 feet (101 m) 2012-: Left Field - 300 feet (91 m); Left-Center - 345 feet (105 m); Center Field - 370 feet (113 m); Right-Center - 345 feet (105 m); Right Field - 300 feet (91 m)

Construction
- Opened: January 1990; 36 years ago
- Renovated: 1997, 2000, 2012, 2013, 2014
- Cost: A$3.9millon (1990), A$250,000 (2000 infield), A$300,000 (2012 refit)
- Architect: CK Designwork Architects

Tenants
- Baseball Victoria Summer League (1990–); Softball Victoria (1990–); Melbourne Aces (ABL) (2012–); Former Tenants; Victorian Baseball Association (1990–2008); Victorian Provincial Baseball League (1990–2008); Melbourne Monarchs (ABL) (1989–99); Melbourne Bushrangers (ABL) (1990–92)

The Melbourne Ballpark is a baseball park in Altona, Victoria. It was opened in January 1990, at a cost of A$3.9m, A$2m was contributed by the State Government of Victoria and the remaining A$1.8m contributed by the Australian Federal Government and was constructed by CK Designwork Architects.

The stadium has a capacity of approximately 5,000. In recent years, seats along the base lines have been removed and replaced with standing room area, reducing the venue's capacity.

== Pre-Construction ==
The Victorian Baseball Association was granted A$50,000 by the State Government of Victoria in the early 1980s to construct a grandstand around the outfield fence of Ross Straw Field in Parkville (Then home of the VBA), However, due to local resident and City of Melbourne opposition this did not eventuate.

After the disappointment of Ross Straw Field the Victorian Baseball Association spent the next 10 years lobbying state government for a venue that Baseball and Softball in Victoria could call their own home. The Department of Sport and Recreation commissioned consultants Loader & Bailey to make a list of locations for a possible venue, A short list of 8 locations was made that included; Brunswick Cricket Ground at number 1, Albert Park at the South Melbourne Cricket Ground, Dandenong North (cnr Heatherton and Stud road) and Altona at number 5.

== Construction ==
When Laverton was selected as the location for the Stadium there was much opposition in the Victorian Baseball Association over its selection, ABC commentator and Waverley Baseball Club coach Dick Mason took his concerns to the Minister for Sport and had the construction postponed while the Government reviewed the location.

Former Victorian Baseball Association president and Australia Baseball Federation director Ron Smith was the major driving force behind the selection of the Laverton location, he reasoned that the land was free and more money could be spent on developing the venue instead of buying somewhere to build it, However other land more centrally located was also offered for free.

In 1988 the funds were released and construction of the stadium started not long after, it was completed in 1989 in time for the maiden season of the ABL. The official opening was held in January 1990 and was officially opened by the Minister for Sport, the Honourable Neil Trezise.

== Renovations ==
Before the 1996-97 ABL season the Melbourne Monarchs installed a new home run fence in front of the existing fence to make the park more 'hitter friendly'. Super Box corporate seating was also installed at ground level behind home plate extending from each dugout around the back net, Super Box seating was also installed in one bay of the undercover seating.

In 2000 the original AstroTurf infield was replaced with a new improved surface at a cost of $250,000. In the mid-2000s the bleacher seating along the first base line was leveled and a grassed family picnic area was installed, the third base side was done the year after.

In mid-2012 a $300,000 upgrade of the stadium funded by Sport and Recreation Victoria was undertaken, upgrades included;

- New Homerun fence constructed and moved in 10m,
- New state-of-the-art synthetic infield surface, that will allow players to wear metal cleats,
- Outfield grass re-leveled and re-seeded,
- Foul ball poles,
- Landscaping entrance,
- Upgraded and repaired lights and announcement systems,
- Dugouts expanded with new front protection provided,
- Replacement of corporate boxes at ground level,
- Upgraded players change rooms.

Future improvements will include new batting cage and bullpens down each foul ball line.

== Baseball ==
The Ballpark hosted the Melbourne Monarchs and Melbourne Bushrangers in the original Australian Baseball League, after the league collapsed in 1999 the stadium was used mostly by Baseball Victoria with Baseball Victoria Summer League night games played at the venue.

The 2002 IBLA season was held at the ballpark, This was the first time a national championship game/series had been held at the ballpark since the collapse of the ABL in 1999.

The Melbourne Aces have called the stadium home since their 3rd year in the new ABL for the 2012/13 Australian Baseball League season. After the Aces first two years playing at the Melbourne Showgrounds, moving to a purpose built baseball stadium offered much more convenience and flexibility towards what they could offer Aces fans. A previous attempt to lure the Aces to the Melbourne Ballpark in 2010 was unsuccessful.

Since the Aces moved to Melbourne Ballpark, Melbourne has hosted the ABL All-Star game six years in row from 2012 to 2017, leading many to agree that Melbourne Ballpark is the best baseball venue in the country.

== Softball ==
The Ballpark has hosted Australian Softball National Championships since its opening in 1990, and also hosted games for the former National Softball Fastpitch League.

In 2006 the inaugural Commonwealth Softball Championships between New Zealand, Australia, Samoa and South Africa.

== Other Sports ==
The stadium has also played host to Motocross events, during various times of the year.

== Other significance ==
From 20 November 2008 until 2 June 2010, the ballpark marked the western end of the light aircraft visual flight rules (VFR) advisory lane of entry to Moorabbin Airport and class G airspace to the south and east. Inbound aircraft tracked from this waypoint ("Altona Baseball Stadium", code "ABBS") to the coast at Altona South and thence to Station Pier at 1500 ft AMSL. Westbound aircraft followed the reciprocal track but at 2500 ft. From 3 June 2010 the western end of the VFR lane was changed to the Bureau of Meteorology (Australia) tower at Laverton, code "TON", approximately 2.3 km WNW of the ballpark.
