= Concord Oval =

Rugby stadium in New South Wales, Australia

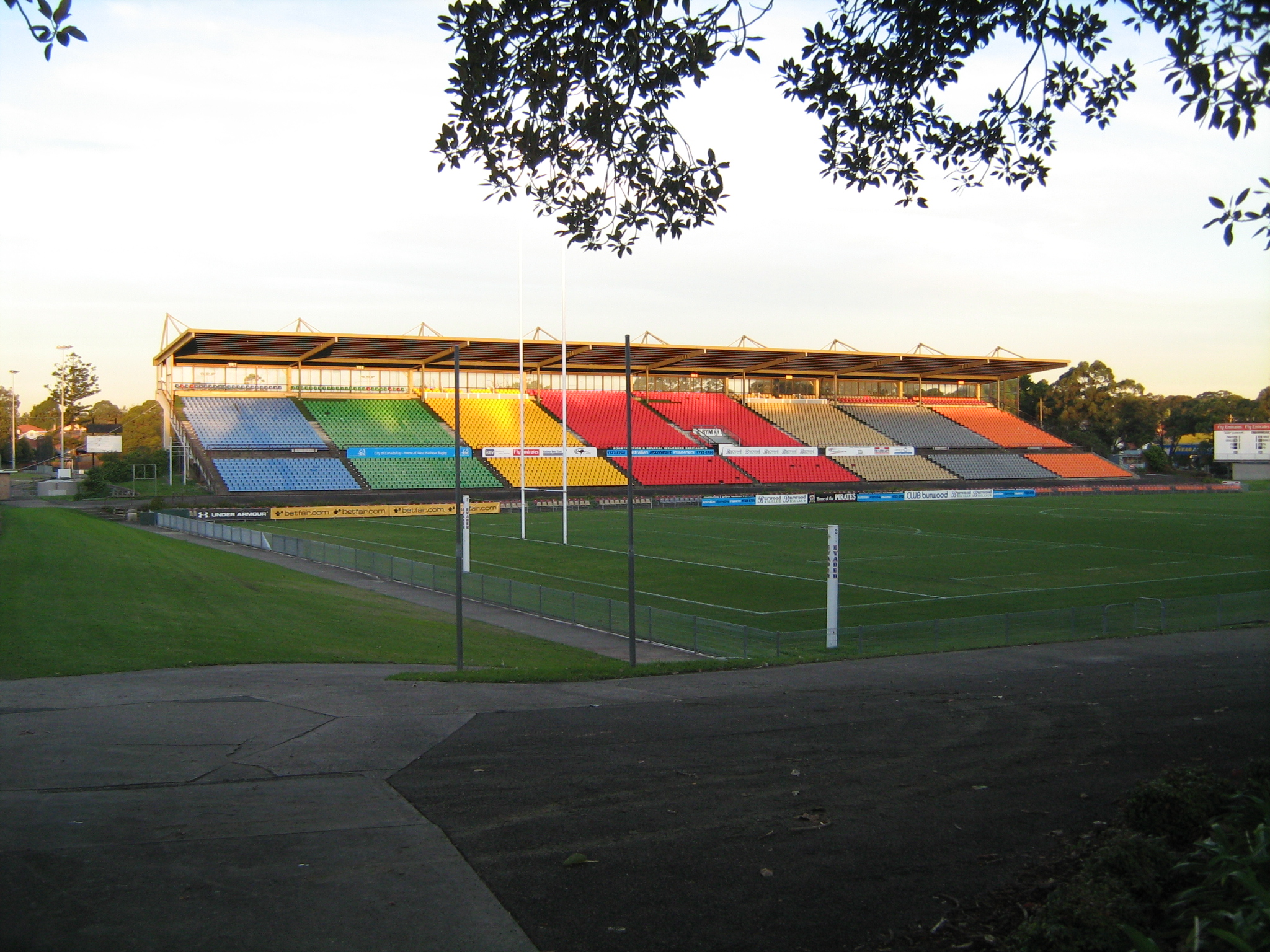
- Concord Oval showing the eastern grandstand prior to redevelopment
- Interactive map of Concord Oval
- Location: Concord, New South Wales
- Coordinates: 33°52′6″S 151°6′34″E
- Owner: City of Canada Bay
- Capacity: 5,000
- Surface: Grass

Construction
- Opened: 1985
- Cost: $85 million (2021–22 redevelopment)

Tenants
- West Harbour RFC; Western Suburbs Magpies (1910–11, 1915–19, 1942); Canterbury-Bankstown Bulldogs (1994); Inter Lions SC; Wests Tigers (training + administration)

Concord Oval (also Waratah Stadium) is a rugby football stadium in the inner-western Sydney suburb of Concord, Australia. The stadium can hold 5000 people, as of November 2022, down from 20,000 when it opened in 1985. As of 2022, it is used mostly for rugby union matches and hosted eight matches during the 1987 Rugby World Cup. It is also a venue for soccer and local rugby league matches.

Concord Oval is the home ground of West Harbour RFC in the Shute Shield rugby union competition, and was the home of Greater Sydney Rams in the defunct National Rugby Championship. It is also the training and administration base for the Wests Tigers rugby league club. The Inter Lions SC soccer club plays some home games at the ground.

== Facilities ==
Since 2022, the stadium has a grandstand on the western side that doubles as the Wests Tigers training and administration facility. The northern end hosts an indoor community sports facility. A small grass hill is on the eastern side with a basketball court and overflow car park behind it while another grass hill is located at the southern end. During the redevelopment, temporary training and administration facilities for the Wests Tigers were located there.

Prior to the redevelopment in 2021, the stadium had two opposing grandstands. The eastern stand hosted tennis box-style seats, a television gantry and change rooms, and ran approximately from try-line to try-line. The western stand contained a gym and some box-style seating. This stand ran approximately from dead-ball line to dead-ball line. In front of the western stand were two rows of seats, while a concrete path extended around the field (except where it ran behind the aforementioned two rows of seats). At each end there was a grassy hill. At the southern or Parramatta Road end, there was a wooden, manually operated scoreboard with an analogue clock.

The stadium is bordered by Gipps Street to the north, Parramatta Road to the south, Loftus Street to the west and the Cintra Hockey Centre to the east. Parking is at a premium with small carparks behind the northern hill, eastern stand and in the south-east corner, although Burwood railway station is not too far away, and the 410, 415, 461N, 461X, 464, 466 and 530 bus routes pass close to the stadium.

== History ==
St Luke's Park, which was the home ground of Sydney's Western Suburbs Magpies rugby league club in 1910 and 1911 was where Concord Oval is now located. Wests started playing their matches at Pratten Park in 1912, but after pressure from local residents there the council refused the club permission to use that ground, forcing them to return to St. Luke's Oval from 1915 to 1919. From 1920 Wests resumed playing at Pratten Park and played at St Luke's again in 1942.

Concord Oval was reconstructed between 1984 and 1987 to become the home of Rugby union in Sydney and subsequently the redeveloped venue hosted games in the 1987 Rugby World Cup.

The stadium also hosted four first grade rugby league matches, three of them in 1994 as Canterbury's second home ground during that season.

In the early 2010s the City of Canada Bay Council prepared a masterplan to bring major events back to an expanded and rejuvenated Concord Oval. This includes construction and installation of broadcasting equipment such as satellite dishes, antennas, camera platforms and commentary boxes, as well as training quality floodlighting and a new scoreboard.

In 2020, it was announced that the Concord Oval will undergo a $51 million redevelopment to accommodate the Wests Tigers new training and administration complex to be completed by mid–2021. Demolition works began in mid-2020 with the Eastern Stand completely demolished by July 2020. The new training and administration facility, commercially known as the Zurich Centre was officially opened on 18 November 2022.

== Rugby World Cup ==
Concord Oval hosted six matches of the 1987 Rugby World Cup.

Date	Competition	Home team		Away team		Attendance
23 May 1987	1987 Rugby World Cup Pool 1	Australia	19	England	6	17,896
30 May 1987	1987 Rugby World Cup Pool 1	England	60	Japan	7	4,893
3 June 1987	1987 Rugby World Cup Pool 1	England	34	United States	6	8,785
3 June 1987	1987 Rugby World Cup Pool 1	Australia	42	Japan	23	8,785
7 June 1987	1987 Rugby World Cup Quarter-final 2	Australia	33	Ireland	15	14,356
13 June 1987	1987 Rugby World Cup Semi-final 1	Australia	24	France	30	17,768
