= Melbourne Monarchs =

- Logo

Information
- League: Australian Baseball League (1989–1999)
- Location: Melbourne
- Ballpark: Melbourne Ballpark
- Founded: 1989–90
- Folded: 1998–99
- Nickname: Monarchs
- League championships: 1992–93
- 1998–99: ?-? (1st)
- Lost (2–1) in 4 team play off series to finish 3rd
- Colours: Blue, Red and White

Current uniforms
| Home | Away |

The Melbourne Monarchs were one of the foundation members of the original (now defunct) Australian Baseball League.

== History ==
The Monarchs had their licence revoked after the 1990–91 championship following a controversial dispute with Australia Baseball League officials.

The Monarchs were replaced in 1991 by the Melbourne Bushrangers. However the Footscray Football Club (now Western Bulldogs) purchased the Monarchs licence for the 1993 championship. In their first season back the Monarchs defeated Perth Heat 2 games to 0 at Perth's home ground Parry Field to take out the 1993 ABL Championship.

| Season | Finish |
|---|---|
| 1989–90 | 2nd |
| 1990–91 | 8th |
| 1992–93 | 1st |
| 1993–94 | 5th |
| 1994–95 | 7th |
| 1995–96 | 6th |
| 1996–97 | 6th |
| 1997–98 | 1st |
| 1998–99 | 3rd |

== See also ==
- Sport in Australia
- Australian Baseball
- Australian Baseball League (1989–1999)
