= Australian Baseball League (1989–1999) =

Defunct baseball league that operated from 1989 to 1999

- Sport: Baseball
- Founded: 1987
- Founder: Australian Baseball Federation
- First season: 1989–90
- Folded: 1999
- No. of teams: 17 (total)
- Country: Australia
- Last champion: Gold Coast Cougars (1998–99)
- Most titles: Waverly/Melbourne Reds (3)
- Related competitions: Claxton Shield

The Australian Baseball League (ABL) was a baseball league, established in 1987 and disbanded in 1999.

== Formation ==
Before the formation of the Australian Baseball League, the Claxton Shield, established in 1934, was Australia's premier baseball tournament. The idea of an Australian baseball league was first conceived in 1987, possibly prompted by the success of Australia's National Basketball League. The final Claxton Shield competition was held in 1988 by the Auburn Baseball Club in New South Wales at its home ground of Oriole Park. Auburn funded all visiting teams' fares and accommodation with the expectation of recouping from gate takings and increased revenue at its social club. Soon after, the ABL was formed, with eight teams from around Australia.

== Competition structure ==
The Australian Baseball League was much like many other professional baseball leagues around the world, with teams playing home and away series during a regular season, playing to compete in the playoffs, the winner of which being crowned champions.

The season length ranged from 42 to 62 games, depending on the number of teams in the season. The competition used the designated hitter rule, much like the Major League Baseball's American League, but allowed aluminium bats for non-MLB contracted players, with the contracted players using wood. There were also allowances in place for pinch runners to run for a catcher if he made base safely, this was put in place for not only speed up the break between innings waiting for a catcher to change into his gear, but to create more excitement on the basepaths. Import restrictions also applied in the League as to nurture home grown talent

The ABL experimented with many different types of scheduling to try to increase attendances, including day and night games at different times of the week, seven-inning double headers. The length of games became a problem as many grounds had night curfews.

== League history ==
The Australian Baseball League consisted of between six and nine teams over its 10 years of existence, with its highest point being in 1995, with nine teams competing. Championships were decided by a top-two five-game playoff series for the first three seasons before changing to a top-four playoff series with winners advancing to the championship series. Following the change to the top four format, both semi-finals and the championship series were played as best-of-three series.

- 1989–90

The Australian Baseball League formally got underway in October 1989, representing Australia's first professional "major league" of baseball. Officially, the first ABL game was contested between Perth Heat and Adelaide Giants at Parry Field in Perth on 27 October 1989, with the Giants winning 8-5. The inaugural season was dominated by the Waverley Reds a record of 34 wins and 6 losses, who only lost 2 games at home in 19 starts, and took the Championship series 3 games to 1 against their crosstown rivals, the Melbourne Monarchs.

- 1990–91

The 1990–91 ABL championship was won by the Perth Heat, who defeated the minor premiers, the Gold Coast's Daikyo Dolphins, by three games to two.

- 1991–92

In a reversal of the previous season, the 1991–92 ABL title was won by the Daikyo Dolphins, who defeated the Perth Heat three games to one.

- 1992–93

The first year of the four-team finals format, the championship series saw the Melbourne Monarchs face the minor premier Perth Heat at Perth's Parry Field, having eliminated the Sydney Blues and Waverley Reds, respectively. The Melbourne Monarchs defeated the Heat two games to nil in the final to clinch the 1992–93 ABL championship.

- 1993–94

Won by the Brisbane Bandits, who defeated the minor premier Sydney Blues two games to nil in the championship series held at Parramatta Stadium. The Perth Heat and Adelaide Giants, respectively, were the two defeated semi-finalists.

- 1994–95

Won by the Waverley Reds, who defeated the Perth Heat two games to nil at Moorabbin Oval. The Sydney Blues (defeated by the Reds) and East Coast Cougars (defeated by the Heat) were eliminated in the semi-finals.

- 1995–96

Won by the Sydney Blues, who defeated the Melbourne Reds two games to nil in the Blues' only season at the old Sydney Showground at Moore Park. In the first time a team had reached the final from fourth place, the Reds defeated the minor premier Brisbane Bandits in the semi-final, while the Perth Heat were eliminated by the Blues.

- 1996–97

Won by the Perth Heat, who defeated the Brisbane Bandits in three games.

- 1997–98

Won by the Melbourne Reds, who defeated the East Coast Cougars in two games.

- 1998–99

The final ABL Championship, held as a test event at the new Sydney Showground at Sydney Olympic Park, was taken in two games by the Gold Coast Cougars (who defeated the Sydney Storm), after the Adelaide Giants dominated the regular season.

=== Decline and sale ===
The ABL had a total running cost of $6 million by the later half of the 1990s, due to a lack of sponsorship and gate takings the league was only raising $4 million by the final season. Due to these mounting debts the Australian Baseball Federation sold off the rights to the league and Claxton Shield to Australian baseball player David Nilsson for a reported $5 million who replaced it with the International Baseball League of Australia, which in turn folded in 2002.

=== Original clubs ===
Over the ten years of the Australian Baseball League, a total of twelve franchise licences were issued; most seasons the ABL had a total of eight teams, but had as many as nine, and, for the final season, six. The founding eight teams of the Australian Baseball League were:

- Adelaide Giants: The Giants competed in all ten seasons of the ABL but did not make the championship playoffs once.
- Brisbane Bandits: The Bandits competed in the first nine seasons but dropped out of the final season due to not having a suitable venue, The Bandits won one championship and finished runner-up in another.
- Gold Coast Clippers: The Clippers had many different names over their ten years in the ABL: The Daikyo Dolphins from 1990 to 1993 due to a sponsorship with Japanese company Daikyo, then the East Coast Cougars and finally Gold Coast Cougars. This franchise won two championships and were runner-up in a further two times.
- Melbourne Monarchs: The Monarchs competed in nine of the ten seasons, they were expelled from the league after the 1991–92 season, but were re-admitted for the 1992–93. The Monarchs won one ABL title (1992–93) and were runner-up to the Reds once (1989–90).
- Parramatta Patriots: The Patriots competed in the first three seasons with their best result being third in 1990. The Patriots disbanded after the 1991–92 season due to heavy financial losses, and the Sydney Blues purchased their licence.
- Sydney Metros: The Metros had the dishonour of being the least successful team in the ABL and also having the shortest history, as they folded shortly after the 1989–90 season. The Metros' licence was purchased by the Sydney Wave.
- Perth Heat: The Heat were the second-most successful team in the league, winning the title twice and finishing runner-up a further three times.
- Waverley Reds: The Reds were the most successful team in the league, being the only team to win three ABL titles, while also finishing runner-up once. The Reds also held the regular-season single-game attendance record (and second-highest overall) of 11,444, in the 1991–92 season against then-cross-town rivals the Melbourne Bushrangers at Waverley Oval. The Reds changed their name to the Melbourne Reds after the 1993–94 season in an attempt to broaden their supporter base.

=== Later additions ===
Later additions to the league were:

- Melbourne Bushrangers: The Bushrangers were brought in to replace the Monarchs after they were expelled, and played two seasons in Melbourne before moving north to Canberra. They thus changed their name to the Canberra Bushrangers and competed for a further two seasons before going broke.
- Sydney Blues: The Blues purchased their licence from the Parramatta Patriots. Due to the marketing problems associated with having the same name as the NSW cricket team [Blues] the name was changed to the Sydney Storm. The team won one championship and finished runner-up under the Blues name; they also finished runner-up once more under the Storm name. The Blues held the overall single-game attendance record, with a 1994 finals series game against the Brisbane Bandits drawing 13,764 to Parramatta Stadium.
- Sydney Wave: The Wave was formed after purchasing its licence of the Sydney Metros. The Wave had no real impact on the league, lasting only two seasons before folding with heavy financial losses. Their licence was then sold to the Hunter Eagles.
- Hunter Eagles: The Eagles had slightly more success in the ABL than their previous two licence-holders, lasting for a total of four seasons. The Eagles were excluded from the 1998–99 season after not being able to supply enough funds to run the team for the upcoming season.

== Players ==
The ABL experienced a lot of baseball talent not only from Australia, but from overseas, with over 90 MLB or future MLB players playing over the history of the competition. Many of these import players were sent to Australia from rookie ball up to advanced A (with some exceptions) as a winter ball league that provided a different environment to winter leagues in Latin America. It proved to be a good 'instructional league' for MLB organisations or even for extended rehabilitation. Many of the import players would not come back for a second season as they were either advanced in their organisation, or replaced by a different player who was thought could benefit from playing in Australia.

== League records ==
=== Batting leaders ===
Stat	Player	Total
AVG	Dave Nilsson	.356
HR	Ronny Johnson	106
RBI	Ronny Johnson	375
R	Andrew Scott	343
H	Andrew Scott	521
SB	Peter Hartas	122

=== Pitching leaders ===
Stat	Player	Total
W	Phil Dale	65
ERA	Graeme Lloyd	2.34
K	Phil Dale	553
IP	Phil Dale	792^{1/3}
SV	Bob Nilsson	53

== New Australian Baseball League ==
The reformed Australian Baseball League starts November 2010

While no confirmation was forthcoming from either source, plans were apparently hatched between the Australian Baseball Federation and Major League Baseball to re-establish an Australian national league in November 2008. The new national league was proposed to run for 10 weeks from November 2008 to February 2009 and to be partly funded by Major League Baseball.

On 10 August 2007 it was announced the 2008 Claxton Shield would be run as a "home and away" series. The revamped series was made up of two pools of three teams, with each team playing three home and three away games against the other two teams in its pool. Pool A was to be made up of the Victoria Aces, Perth Heat and South Australia, and Pool B was to be made up of the New South Wales Patriots, Queensland Rams and Australia Provincial. The revamped series was run from late December 2007 to early February 2008.

The 2009 series followed a similar format, but without the Australia Provincial team, resulting in each team playing each other team once in either a home or an away three-game series, in addition to a "showcase" round to start the season, held in Sydney with each team playing every other team once over the course of the week.

On 1 July 2009, a joint announcement was made by the Australian Baseball Federation, Australian Federal Government and Major League Baseball stating the intention to resurrect a national baseball league for Australia, with the Government announcing A$400,000 towards the new league.

It was originally planned that the Australian Baseball League would eventually have a 60-game season from November to February consisting of teams from Adelaide, Brisbane, Melbourne, Perth and Sydney with a pending spot for Canberra. The league is 75% owned by Major League Baseball and 25% by the Australian Baseball Federation. The first ABL season is scheduled for November–February 2009/2010, but will be run under the banner of the 2010 Claxton Shield with 2011 season scheduled to be the first 'official' season. Some players will be paid, and some will not, with an average salary expected to be about A$800 per month. Players will be under contract, although the system of player-league relations will be highly centralized in the ABF for the league's early years in order to ensure cheap and efficient league operation. In November 2009 referendums were held on team names.

In November 2009, the Australian Baseball League approved Canberra's bid for a 6th spot in the inaugural ABL season with the ACT Government contributing $75,000 for the first season, and $30,000 every other season. Also, the franchise already has over $64,000 from 3200 people pledging support at $20 a head during the bid attempt. ActewAGL, Rolfe Audi were announced as major sponsors of the team.

In May, 2010, the Australian Baseball League made steps towards marketing their product, producing a website and two advertisements shown on ESPN Australia and ONE HD. The logo was officially unveiled and the Melbourne franchise's general manager, Stephen Nash, announced a 40-game season between six franchises over 10 weeks from November to January, with a post-season finals series in February.

On 5 August 2010, the team names for the Australian Baseball League were made public. They include the Brisbane Bandits, the Sydney Blue Sox, the Canberra Cavalry, the Melbourne Aces, the Adelaide Bite and the Perth Heat.

Since its beginning in 2010, the Australian Baseball League has expanded to have 8 teams on its roster, with the addition of the Auckland Tuatara and Geelong-Korea in the 2018/2019 Season. The League has also been divided into the South-West Division and the North-East Division.

== See also ==
- Australian Baseball League Awards
- List of Australian Baseball League records
