= Gold Coast Cougars =

- Logo

Information
- League: Australian Baseball League (1989-1999)
- Location: Gold Coast
- Ballpark: Carrara Stadium
- Founded: 1989-90
- Folded: 1998-99
- Nickname: Cougars
- League championships: 1991-92, 1998-99
- 1998-99: 24-20 (2nd)
- League Champions
- Former name: Gold Coast Clippers, Daikyo Dolphins, East Coast Cougars
- Former ballpark(s): Lang Park, Palm Meadows

Current uniforms
Home	Away

The Gold Coast Cougars were the re-branded Daikyo Dolphins after major sponsor Daikyo had to end sponsorship of the team due to financial problems with the Australian arm of the company.

== History ==
Season	Finish
1993-94	8th
1994-95	3rd
1995-96	5th
1996-97	5th
1997-98	2nd
1998-99	1st

== Team Australia players ==
The Gold Coast Cougars have sent numerous players to represent the Australia national baseball team on various international stages including the World Baseball Classic, Olympic baseball, Intercontinental Cup (baseball) and Baseball World Cup

Player name	Years Represented	Level(s)
Trent Durrington	1993, 2001	Intercontinental Cup (baseball), Baseball World Cup
Chris Oxspring	2004–2017	Olympics, World Baseball Classic
Stuart Thompson	1993–1996	Olympics, Intercontinental Cup (baseball)
Peter Vogler	1988–1999	Olympics, Asian Championship, Intercontinental Cup (baseball), Baseball World Cup
Ben Foster	2001	Baseball World Cup
Shayne Bennett	1999-2000	Olympics, Intercontinental Cup (baseball)
Ronny Johnson	1998-2000	Olympics, Intercontinental Cup (baseball), Baseball World Cup
Bob Nilsson	1997	Intercontinental Cup (baseball)

== Notable alumni ==
- Trent Durrington
- Ronny Johnson
- Paul Gorman
- Jose Macias
- Brandon Pollard
- Peter Vogler
- Bob Nilsson
- Gary Nilsson
- Stuart Thompson
- Ben Foster
- Shayne Bennett

== See also ==
- Sport in Australia
- Australian Baseball
- Australian Baseball League (1989-1999)
- Boston Red Sox - MLB affiliate
