= List of Australian Baseball League records =

A list of records from the Australian Baseball League (1989–1999) and current Australian Baseball League.

== Offensive Records ==
=== .400 season ===
Player	Team	Year	At Bats	Average
John Jaha	Daikyo Dolphins	1992		.445
David Clarkson	Waverley Reds	1990	126	.444{{
Jay Baum	Canberra Cavalry	2017	139	.439
Brendan Kingman	Sydney Blues	1998		.427
Mike Brosseau	Perth Heat	2017	96	.427
Andrew Scott	Adelaide Giants	1994		.414
Brian Burgamy	Canberra Cavalry	2017	164	.409
Adam Burton	Brisbane Bandits	1994		.402
David Nilsson	Daikyo Dolphins	1991	135	.400

=== Other ===
- Most hits in a season: 78 from 208 at bats by Steve Hinton in 1998.
- Highest on-base percentage: .562 by Brendan Kingman in 1998.
- Most Home Runs in a Season, 28 by Brendan Kingman in 1998

== Pitching records ==
=== Perfect games ===
A perfect game has never been pitched in the Australian Baseball League.

=== No-hitters ===
Date	Pitchers	Team	Against	Location	Innings	Hits	Runs	Walks	Strike Outs	Hit Batters	Sacrifice Hits	Wild Pitches	Batters Faced
29 November 1990	Chip Duncan & Michael Hennessy	Parramatta Patriots	Brisbane Bandits	North Ipswich Reserve	7	0	0	6	12	2	0	0	28
21 November 1991	Jody Treadwell	Adelaide Giants	Sydney Wave	Norwood Oval	7	0	0	2	14	0	2	0	24
8 January 1993	Kevin Gallaher				6	0	1	4	5	0	2	2	22
22 January 1994	John Boothby	Brisbane Bandits	Adelaide Giants	Norwood Oval	7	0	0	4	10	1	0	0	25
2 January 1995	Gary Nilsson, Kelly Wunsch, Cameron Cairncross	Brisbane Bandits	Canberra Bushrangers	RNA Showgrounds	7	0	0	4	5	1	1	0	22
10 February 1995	Allen McDill	Melbourne Monarchs	Gold Coast Cougars	Melbourne Ballpark	7	0	0	4	3	1	0	0	25
7 November 1998	Matt Herges & John Challinor	Adelaide Giants	Gold Coast Cougars	Carrara Stadium	9	0	0	4	10	0	0	0	31
4 February 2011	David Welch	Sydney Blue Sox	Adelaide Bite	Blacktown Baseball Stadium	9	0	0	3	10	0	0	0	30

== See also ==
- Baseball in Australia
