= Sports on the Gold Coast, Queensland =

Overview of sports in Gold Coast, Queensland, Australia

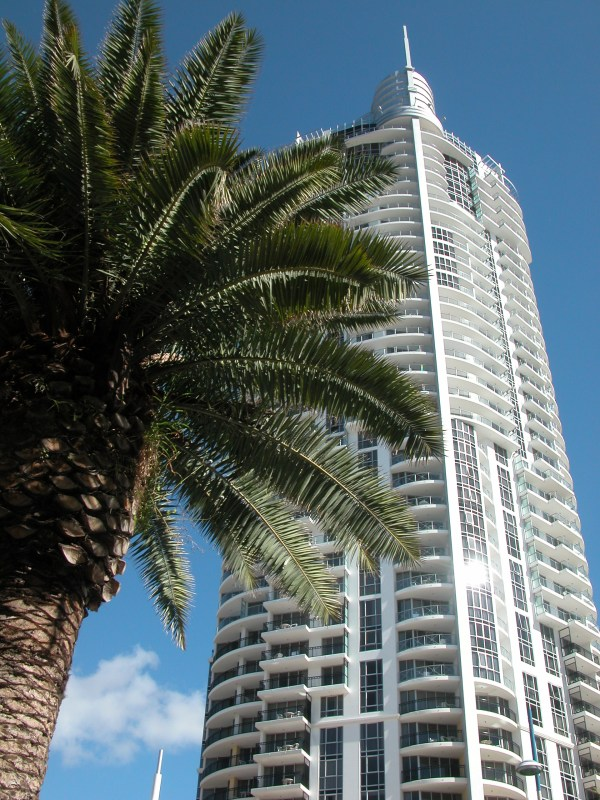
Glitz and palm trees.

Sport on the Gold Coast has a rich history. As a popular tourist destination leisure sports like Golf, but most particularly sports associated with its famous beaches, have always been popular. A number of surf clubs line Gold Coasts beaches, who host a variety of swimming and athletic events collected into surf carnivals along with competitions evolved from methods of surf life saving.

The two most popular sports on the Gold Coast are Australian rules football and rugby league, of which the city is represented by professional teams in two most popular national competitions - the Gold Coast Suns (AFL) and the Gold Coast Titans (NRL). Motor racing has a strong history on the coast with racing having been held in the region since 1954, but consistently since the late 1960s with only a small break in the late 1980s as well as hosting the region's largest event, the Gold Coast 600.

The region has had a sporadic history with professional club sport. Several national competitions in Australia's different football codes and basketball have attempted to establish clubs in the city since the 1980s, often bankrolled by wealthy private owners including Christopher Skase and Clive Palmer, and most such clubs have folded within only a few years. No Gold Coast based club has yet won a national premiership in its code.

The region was the host of the 2018 Commonwealth Games, building and upgrading various venues all over the Coast. The games were centred on Carrara Stadium.

== Professional sports ==
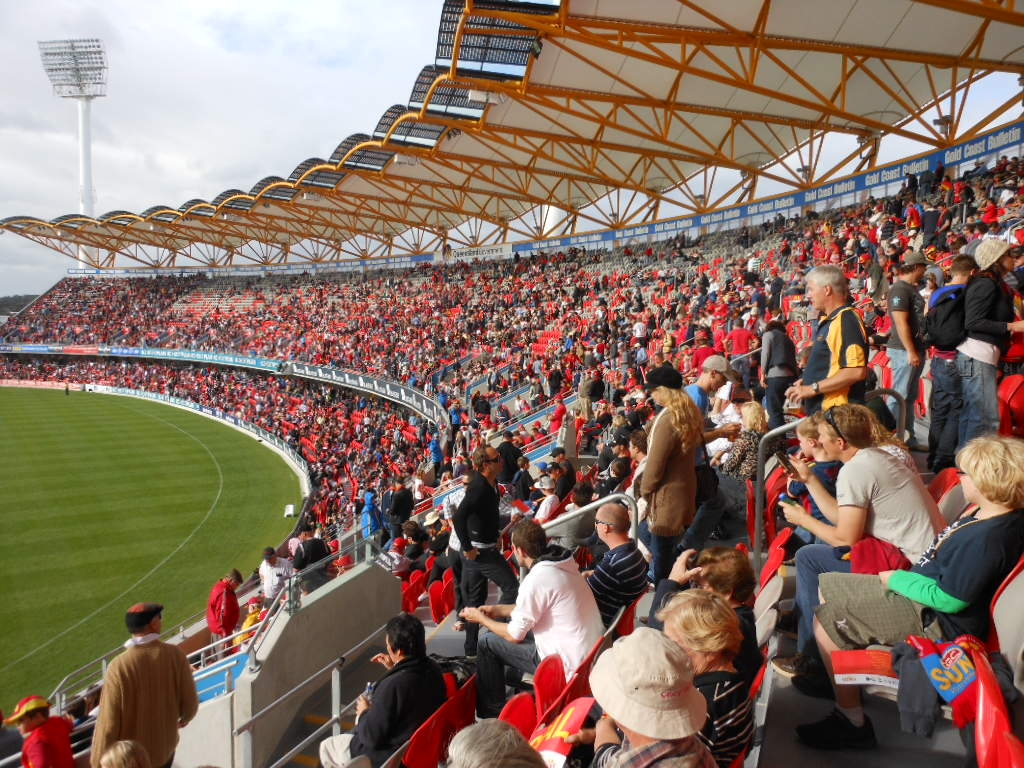
Carrara Stadium, home of the AFL's Gold Coast Suns.

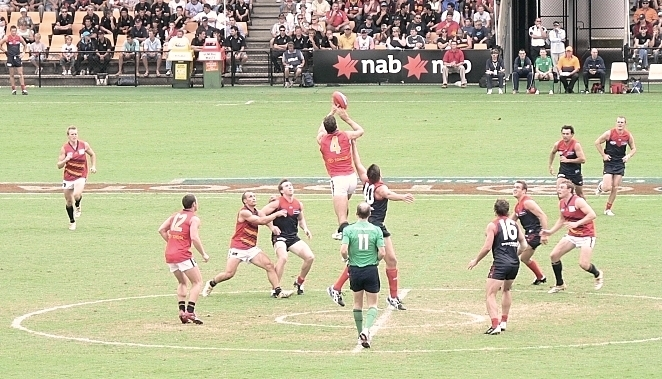
Australian rules football being played at Carrara Stadium.

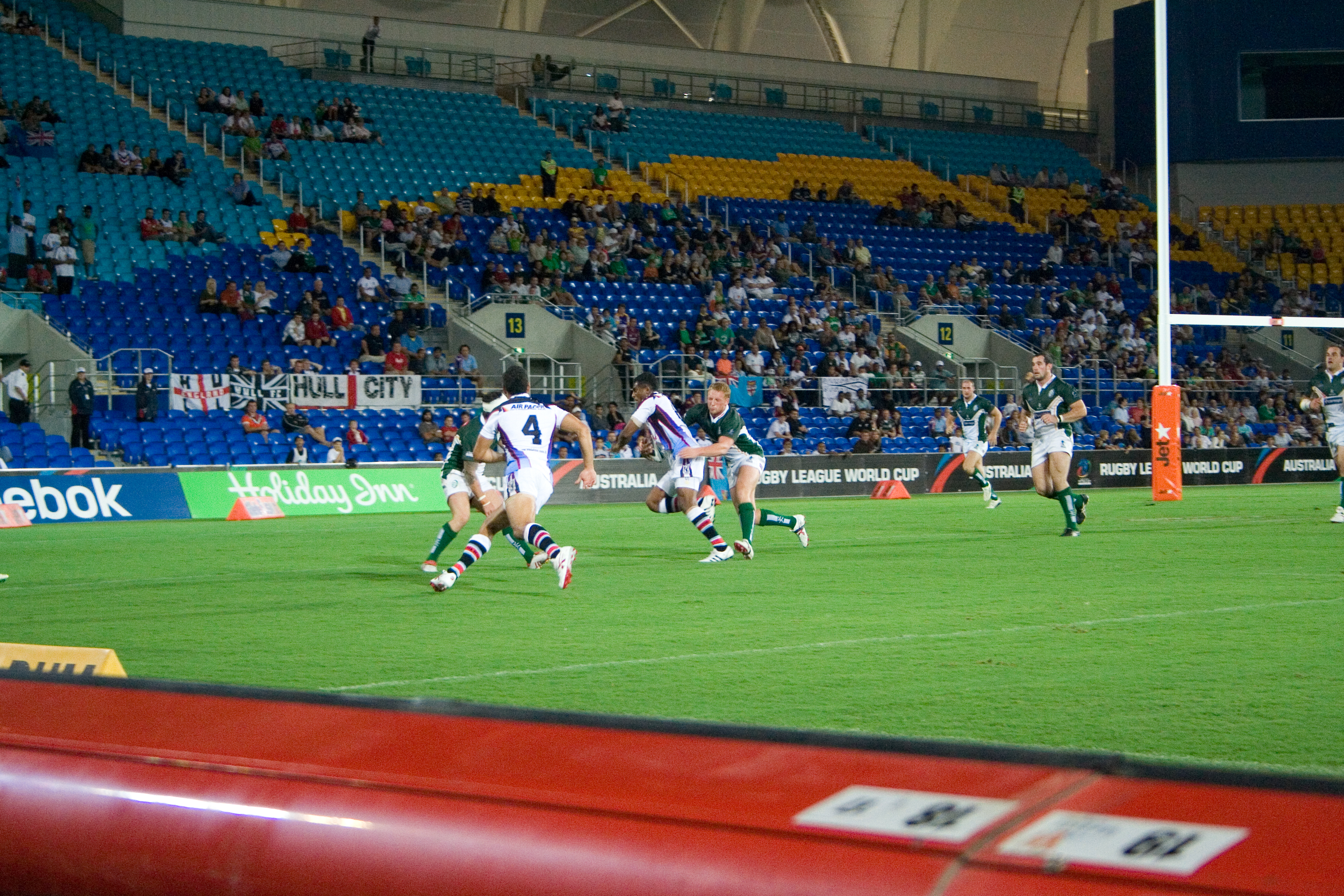
Robina Stadium, home of the NRL's Gold Coast Titans.

The Gold Coast is currently home to professional sports teams in Australian rules football and rugby league. These teams are the Gold Coast Suns (Australian Football League) and the Gold Coast Titans (National Rugby League). Many other professional clubs have competed in national leagues since the 1980s, but these clubs have consistently struggled to support themselves financially, and have generally folded within a decade of being founded. The city has consequently been described a "sporting graveyard". On-field performances have also generally been poor, and as of 2022, no Gold Coast-based team has won a premiership in a national professional club competition.

The city also hosts successful professional events in non-club sports, including golf, surfing and motor racing.

=== Current professional clubs ===
| Club | Sport | League | Stadium | First Year |
|---|---|---|---|---|
| Gold Coast Titans | Rugby League Football | National Rugby League | Cbus Stadium | 2007 |
| Gold Coast Suns | Australian Rules Football | Australian Football League | Carrara Stadium | 2011 |

=== Former professional clubs ===
| Club | Sport | League | Stadium | First year | Final year |
|---|---|---|---|---|---|
| Brisbane Bears | Australian rules football | Victorian/Australian Football League | Carrara Stadium | 1987 | 1992 (moved to Brisbane) |
| Gold Coast-Tweed Giants; Gold Coast Seagulls | Rugby league | New South Wales / Australian Rugby League | Seagulls Stadium, Tweed Heads | 1988 | 1995 (folded) |
| Daikyo Dolphins Gold Coast Clippers | Baseball | Australian Baseball League | Palm Meadows | 1989/90 | 1993/94 (folded) |
| Gold Coast Gladiators | Rugby league | Australian Rugby League | Carrara Stadium | 1996 (preseason only) | 1996 (licence revoked) |
| Gold Coast Chargers | Rugby league | Australian / National Rugby League | Carrara Stadium | 1996 | 1998 (folded) |
| Gold Coast Cougars/Rollers | Basketball | National Basketball League | Carrara Indoor Stadium | 1990 | 1996 (licence revoked) |
| East Coast Aces | Rugby union | Australian Rugby Championship | Carrara Stadium | 2007 | 2007 (competition folded) |
| Gold Coast Blaze | Basketball | National Basketball League | Gold Coast Convention and Exhibition Centre | 2007 | 2012 (folded) |
| Gold Coast United | Soccer | A-League | Robina Stadium | 2009/10 | 2011/12 (licence revoked) |

=== Professional sports curse ===
The Gold Coast is notorious for having teams perform poorly in the major Australian sports leagues and either fold, rebrand or relocate shortly after entry.

Only one Gold Coast team has ever reached the Grand Final of any major sports league in Australia without winning a premiership or championship. The closest a Gold Coast team has come to winning a premiership or championship was the Gold Coast Titans making the 2023 NRLW Grand Final losing to Newcastle 24–12. The Gold Coast is often referred to as "the graveyard" due to the number of professional sports teams that have folded in the city. The teams will often fall into trouble over poor on field performances, financial problems, ownership issues and/or under performing shortly after signing a marquee player. One of the city's two current professional teams, the NRL's Titans, fell dangerously close to suffering the same fate in 2015 as Australian media outlets reported they were trying desperately to avoid the curse.

Gold Coast based motor racing teams Dick Johnson Racing, Stone Brothers Racing, Tekno Autosports and McElrea Racing have won multiple championships and major races.

=== Rugby league football ===
Rugby league football is represented by the Gold Coast Titans football club who are based at Robina Stadium and play in the National Rugby League competition.

Gold Coast's first entry to national-level rugby league was the introduction of the Gold Coast-Tweed Giants into the New South Wales Rugby League competition in 1988. The club played at Seagulls Stadium in Tweed Heads, which is located just across the border in New South Wales, but borders the Gold Coast and is considered by many to be a part of the greater Gold Coast area. The club was forced to play in Tweed Heads due to a clause in the Brisbane Broncos licence at the time which disallowed any other clubs from playing in south-east Queensland, but was also financially favourable for the club, as the club was allowed to produce revenue through gaming machines which was a legal practice in New South Wales but not in Queensland. In 1990, the team became known as the Gold Coast Seagulls but continued to play out of Tweed Heads, with the occasional game played at Carrara Stadium. In 1991 the Gaming Machine Act passed in Queensland which caused considerable damage to the Seagulls' bottom line, and the club withdrew from the NSWRL in 1995 due to financial strains and the looming Super League war.

Property entrepreneur Jeff Muller took over the club, renamed it the Gold Coast Gladiators and moved it to Carrara, Queensland, but his licence was revoked before the start of the 1996 season. A new administration renamed it the Gold Coast Chargers, and it competed for a further three years before folding as the NRL contracted in the aftermath of the Super League war.

The Gold Coast occasionally hosted NRL matches between 1999 and 2005, and established the Gold Coast Titans in 2006 to enter the National Rugby League in 2007. The Titans have played at Robina Stadium since 2008, spending the 2007 season based at Carrara Stadium. Like its predecessors, the Titans' have struggled with its finances. It had fallen into $35 million debt by mid-2012, and according to chairwoman Rebecca Frizelle the club was just weeks away from folding. In 2015, the NRL took over financial administration of the struggling club. The 2021 NRL Finals Series had the Gold Coast Titans played the Sydney Roosters, with the Roosters slightly knocking the Titans out of the finals.

=== Australian rules football ===
Gold Coast is home to the Gold Coast Suns, an AFL team that plays at Metricon Stadium in Carrara.

The Brisbane Bears became the first professional sports team based in Gold Coast in 1987 when the team entered the Victorian Football League and played at Carrara Stadium, under the ownership of Christopher Skase. The club struggled financially, and Skase spent $29 million propping up the team for three seasons before he fled the country following the collapse of his business group Qintex.

Gold Coast philanthropist Reuben Pelerman took over ownership of the struggling club, and lost a further $10 million over three years before he decided to permanently relocate the team to Brisbane in 1993, staving off media rumours of the Bears merging with fellow cellar-dwellers Sydney to form a combined Queensland/New South Wales team, the Northern Swans, or relocation to either Tasmania or Port Adelaide.

Since relocating to Brisbane, the Bears were rebranded the Lions in 1996 after merging with Fitzroy, and have enjoyed greater success both on and off the field, including three successive premierships.

Professional football returned to the Gold Coast in 2006 when the Brisbane Lions and the North Melbourne Kangaroos began playing some home games at Carrara Stadium. The successful trial period led to the AFL working to establish a new club in Gold Coast. North Melbourne was offered a $100 million package to relocate to the Gold Coast; when the club rejected the offer, the Gold Coast Football Club was established. The club, nicknamed the Suns, has competed in the Australian Football League since 2011.

=== Basketball ===
Two Gold Coast based teams have contested the National Basketball League. The first, known as the Gold Coast Cougars, was established for the 1990 season. The Cougars were based at the Carrara Indoor Stadium; following the team's first season in the NBL, they rebranded to become the Gold Coast Rollers. The club fell into financial difficulties in 1996 which resulted in the NBL revoking their license. On 21 November 2006, the NBL accepted a bid for a new Gold Coast franchise, known as the Gold Coast Blaze, which played out of the Gold Coast Convention and Exhibition Centre. After five seasons in the league, the Blaze also folded due to financial troubles.

=== Soccer ===
On 3 June 2008, Football Federation Australia announced that Gold Coast United FC would join the A-League for the 2009–10 season and would play home games at Robina Stadium. Gold Coast United was funded by local billionaire Clive Palmer. After three seasons in which the club struggled to establish itself, its A-League licence was revoked and a new club established in its place in Western Sydney. Unusual ownership decisions made by Palmer, who personally lost $18 million during the three years, were generally considered to have hindered the club's growth; for example, a decision to cap home crowds at 5,000 in order to reduce rent and transport expenses was criticised by the Football Federation of Australia as being counteractive to the club's development.

=== Beach Volleyball ===
Surfers Paradise beach hosts one of the three Australian Beach Volleyball Tour Grand Slams each year. The Grand Slams are the highest level of domestic beach volleyball that can be played in Australia and count towards the national rankings as well as Olympic qualification.

=== Horse Racing ===
The Gold Coast Turf Club hosts weekly horse races every Saturday from 12 o'clock midday for a minor entry fee. Facilities include a bookmaker's ring, betting tote through UBET, four small to large function venues and public food and drink outlets.

Magic Millions a thoroughbred auction sales and racing event is the largest to be held on the Gold Coast. This annual event held in January each year attracts buyers and enthusiasts from around the world, with one year a staggering $100 million turnover in yearling sales. The most prestigious horse race on the Gold Coast, also named the Magic Millions, is held each January at the Gold Coast Turf Club.

=== Golf ===
The Royal Pines Resort on the Gold Coast is home to both the Australian Ladies Masters (women's) and Australian PGA Championship (men's) events. The Ladies Masters was first held on the Gold Coast in 1990 at Palm Meadows and moved to its current home in 1992. The PGA Championship was first held on the Gold Coast in 1970 and returned in both 1971 and 1975. Following the 1975 Championships, the event did not return to the Gold Coast until 2013.

=== Surfing ===
The Roxy Pro and Quiksilver Pro are held on the Gold Coast and kickstart the ASP World Surfing Tour calendar each year. The Association of Surfing Professionals headquarters is located in the Gold Coast suburb of Coolangatta.

=== Motor racing ===
Numerous professional racing teams are based in the Gold Coast area competing in several national championships spread across circuit and drag racing. The biggest operations have been the Supercars Championship teams, led by three times series champions Stone Brothers Racing, Tekno Autosports, Paul Morris Motorsport, Triple F Racing and Australia's oldest touring car team, Dick Johnson Racing.

Previously Surfers Paradise International Raceway had hosted drag racing and been a regular venue for the Australian Touring Car Championship and before that the Tasman Series which saw touring European Formula One teams visit Queensland. The Australian Grand Prix was held there in 1975, while the earliest major sporting event on the Coast was the 1954 Australian Grand Prix held on a giant street circuit in Southport, to the west of the present day street circuit.

Following that circuit's demise, the Gold Coast has held a street race on the streets of Surfers Paradise since 1991, for Championship Auto Racing Teams and its successors, until 2008, when it was a non-championship IndyCar Series race. It was an international event, and was shifted to A1 Grand Prix for 2009, but the series collapsed, and dropped its international status in favour of being a domestic race in the Supercars Championship, now known as the Gold Coast 600.

=== Other professional and semi-professional sports ===
The Gold Coast has previously been home to professional teams/events in baseball, basketball, ice hockey, rugby union, soccer and tennis.

==== Baseball ====
The Gold Coast Clippers were a foundation team in the now defunct Australian Baseball League and competed in the inaugural 1989-90 ABL season. The Clippers played home games at Carrara Stadium during their first season but re-branded to the Daikyo Dolphins a year later and set up base at Palm Meadows. The Dolphins were able to win the Gold Coast's first national championship of any sport in the 1991-92 season where they defeated the Perth Heat 3–1 in the Championship series. Daikyo, the major sponsor of the Dolphins, ended their association with the club in 1993 and the team once again re-branded to become the Gold Coast Cougars and also returned to Carrara Stadium for the 1993-94 season. The Cougars managed to acquire a second championship in the final season of the Australian Baseball League where they defeated the Sydney Storm in the 1998–99 Championship series. Although the national Baseball league in Australia was disbanded in 1999, the Gold Coast now hosts the Major League Baseball Australia Academy Program at Palm Meadows and has produced several Major League Baseball players since its inception in 2001.

==== Ice Hockey ====
In 2008, the semi-professional Brisbane Blue Tongues in the Australian Ice Hockey League moved base to Iceland on the Gold Coast and formed the Gold Coast Blue Tongues. Serious health and safety risks were discovered at the Iceland venue in 2013 and the team was given two years to find an alternate home venue. The Blue Tongues General Manager was unable to secure government funding for a new dual-rink facility on the Gold Coast and the team officially folded in 2015 when their AIHL licence expired.

==== Rugby union ====
The East Coast Aces rugby union team were based at Carrara Stadium for the duration of the 2007 Australian Rugby Championship. The ARC was disbanded after one season and the Aces stopped operations. The Australian Sevens rugby union tournament was held on the Gold Coast from 2011/12 until 2014/15 at Robina Stadium, when it was known as the Gold Coast Sevens; it has since been moved to Sydney after poor crowds on the Gold Coast. Earlier in 2014, the Wallabies recorded their worst crowd in a century during an international match at Robina; the Australian Rugby Union has since determined international rugby union would not return to the Gold Coast (other than the pre-planned Commonwealth Games Sevens tournament in 2018).

==== Tennis ====
In 1990, the Gold Coast hosted its first major tennis tournament in the form of the ATP Doubles Tour World Championships. The event was held in Sanctuary Cove at the Hope Island Resort Tennis Centre and was won by Guy Forget and Jakob Hlasek. In 1997, the Corel WTA Tour created a new event – played on outdoor hardcourts – in Gold Coast, Queensland. The Tier III Gold Coast Classic was added the three preexisting tournaments of Auckland, Sydney and Hobart, and became one of the two events held in the first week of the women's calendar, parallel to the men's Adelaide tournament. The Gold Coast Classic became the Thalgo Australian Women's Hardcourts in 1998, took the sponsorship of Uncle Tobys in 2003, becoming Uncle Tobys Hardcourts, and changed names again in 2006 to Mondial Australian Women's Hardcourts. In 2006 Tennis Australia decided to merge the Gold Coast and Adelaide events into a larger ATP-WTA joint tournament in Brisbane to be first held in 2009. The last edition of the Gold Coast event was held in 2008 and was won by Li Na, who defeated future career rival and rising star Victoria Azarenka in the final in three sets.

== Local sports ==
=== Historical Reenactment Combat ===
Byzantine Living History trains in hand-to-hand combat with blunt and rounded steel weapons from Byzantine/Eastern Roman Empire from the 9th to 13th centuries. They perform at public shows such as the Abbey Medieval Festival and History Alive, and also participate in private reenactor-only gatherings.

=== Australian rules football ===
The Gold Coast is home to the Southport Sharks, a semi-professional football team that competes in the Victorian Football League among AFL reserve sides after the North East Australian Football League (NEAFL) competition ended in 2020. The Broadbeach Cats and Labrador Tigers also previously competed in the NEAFL until they were demoted to the amateur Queensland competition in 2014.

=== Rugby league ===
The Burleigh Bears are currently the only Gold Coast-based team that competes in the Queensland Cup. The Tweed Heads Seagulls also compete in the Queensland Cup and are based in the suburb over the Gold Coast-New South Wales border. The Bears serve as a feeder club for the Brisbane Broncos, while the Seagulls are a feeder club for the Gold Coast Titans.

=== Cricket ===
The Gold Coast District Cricket Club is a cricket club on the Gold Coast, Queensland who play in the Brisbane Grade Cricket competition, also known as the Gold Coast Dolphins. They were founded in 1990.

=== Rugby union ===
The Gold Coast Breakers play in the Queensland Premier Rugby competition, the third level of rugby union in Australia.

=== Soccer ===
Gold Coast United FC and Gold Coast Knights SC compete in the National Premier Leagues Queensland competitions which is the second tier of Australian soccer, one step below the A-League.

=== Gaelic games ===
The Gold Coast Gaels were established in October 2013 and compete in the Queensland Gaelic Football and Hurling Association. The Gaels play home games at Scottsdale Drive Oval, the home of the Robina Roos SEQAFL team.

== Recreation ==
There are many recreational activities situated on the Gold Coast ranging from Surfing to fishing and Boating to Golf.

=== Surfing ===
The Gold Coast is a popular place for surfing. World class breaks including TOS, Sandpumping Jetty, Burleigh, Currumbin Alley, Greenmount Beach, Kirra, Snapper Rocks and Duranbah (just over border into NSW). There are also many other surfing locations along the open beaches. The Roxy Pro and Quiksilver Pro are held on the Gold Coast and kickstart the ASP World Surfing Tour calendar each year. The Association of Surfing Professionals headquarters is located at Coolangatta.

=== Fishing ===
Fishing is a popular activity on the Gold Coast with clubs like Gold Coast Game Fish Club and Surfers Paradise Game & Sport Fishing Club. Popular fishing spots include the Sandpumping Jetty on the Spit, Offshore reefs at Palm Beach, The Narrowneck Reef, the Gold Coast Broadwater, Jumpinpin, Coomera, Logan and Albert Rivers, Currumbin and Tallebudgera Creek and fresh water environments at Robina Lakes and Hinze Dam.

=== Boating ===
Boating is a popular activity on the Gold Coast. There are waterskiing areas at upper coomera, santa barbara, along the western Broadwater, Tipplers, Currigee, Isle of Capri, Carrara and Tallebudgera Creek. There is yacht, dinghy and catermaran racingn held both in the Broadwater and marks offshore for various types of vessel events. Sailing is popular with the 2013 queensland IRC Yacht Championships held offshore as well as the 2013 Nacra Infusion World championships. The Gold Coast has a growing mega yacht industry and boat manufacturing industry. Fishing vessels include tinnies up to three-storey fly bridge versions. There are 35 public boatramps spread throughout the city from Waterford to Currumbin and there are 105,000 registered vessels {2001} within two hours drive of a Gold Coast Boatramp.

=== Golf ===
The Gold Coast has over fifty private and public golf courses including several resort courses.

== Gold Coast sports venues ==
The Gold Coast is host to a range first class sporting venues, from outdoor stadiums to indoor arenas and the Olympic class training facilities.

=== Surfers Paradise street circuit ===
The Gold Coast's biggest sporting event is held not at a permanent facility, but on a street circuit in Surfers Paradise, with the Gold Coast Highway as the front straight: a temporary facility that disappears for 50 weeks of the year. Tens of thousands of spectators attend the Gold Coast 600 each October to see the V8 Supercar Championship Series, with the IndyCar Series having replaced the now defunct Champ Car World Series. It is the third of three racing circuits to have existed on the Gold Coast. Surfers Paradise International Raceway existed just to the west of Carrara Stadium until it was closed in the mid-80s and lay derelict for several decades before finally being built over. Another street circuit existed for onea weekend in 1954 further north in Southport.

=== Carrara Stadium ===
Carrara Stadium is a 25,000 capacity oval stadium, located in the suburb of Carrara and is the centrepiece of the Carrara Sports Precinct. It has previously hosted teams in a range of sports and currently hosts the Australian Football League's Gold Coast Suns.

The infrastructure was significantly developed during the Christopher Skase era of the Brisbane Bears. In late 2009, the stadium was demolished and a new $144.2 million stadium was built on the same site for the Gold Coast Suns. The stadium will be upgraded to 40,000 capacity in 2018 in preparation for the Commonwealth Games.

=== Robina Stadium ===
Robina Stadium is a 27,400 capacity rectangular stadium. Completed in February 2008, it is located in the suburb of Robina and sits adjacent to Robina Train Station. It has previously hosted soccer and rugby union teams and currently hosts the National Rugby League's Gold Coast Titans.

=== Carrara Indoor Stadium ===
The Carrara Indoor Stadium neighbours Carrara Stadium and has a seated capacity of 2,992. It was previously the home of the basketball team, the Gold Coast Rollers. The stadium is set to be replaced by a new sports and leisure venue called the Carrara Sport and Leisure Centre prior to the 2018 Commonwealth Games.

=== Gold Coast Convention and Exhibition Centre ===
Situated in Broadbeach, the Gold Coast Convention and Exhibition Centre was opened on 29 June 2004 at a cost of $127 million. It was home to the National Basketball League team Gold Coast Blaze until it pulled out of the competition at the conclusion of the 2012 season. The centre is also the alternate venue for the Queensland Firebirds who play in the National Netball League and is set to host the basketball and netball competitions at the 2018 Commonwealth Games. It has a total capacity of 6,000 and can seat 5,269 spectators.

=== Runaway Bay Sports Super Centre ===
This facility is located at the northern end of the Gold Coast, in the suburb of Runaway Bay, has been earmarked as a world class training facility. The centre includes nine purpose built villas which provide accommodation for touring groups or sporting teams, FINA approved 50-metre outdoor swimming pool, an IAAF certified 10 lane 400-metre athletic track with 3000 seater capacity stadium, a 600 m2 gymnasium and health spa. It is being used by the Gold Coast Titans until their own HQ and training facilities are built in Robina.

=== Nerang Velodrome ===
The Nerang Velodrome (including the Nerang International Criterium Circuit Velodrome) is a 356 m asphalt track with lights for night time use. There is a permanent covered grandstand for 240 people and temporary grandstands for a further 150 people. The Criterium Circuits include three hot-mix asphalt circuits. There is a flat 600 m circuit, and 900 m and 1500 m circuits which both include a 200 m hill.

It hosted the pre-2000 Olympic Games training for Great Britain Cycling (Road) and Triathlon Teams, and the Sweden Cycling (track) Team. The nearby Nerang State Forest, with its hilly terrain and well-maintained trails is a favourite recreational area for mountain bike riders.

=== Southport Aquatic Centre ===
The Gold Coast Aquatic Centre was redeveloped in 2013 in the buildup to the 2018 Commonwealth Games. The venue is located in the suburb of Southport and hosted the 2014 Pan Pacific Swimming Championships which saw the most successful Olympian of all time Michael Phelps compete on the Gold Coast.

== See also ==
- Sport in Queensland
- Professional boxing on the Gold Coast
