= Gold Coast Sports Precinct =

Series of sports facilities and venues in Queensland, Australia

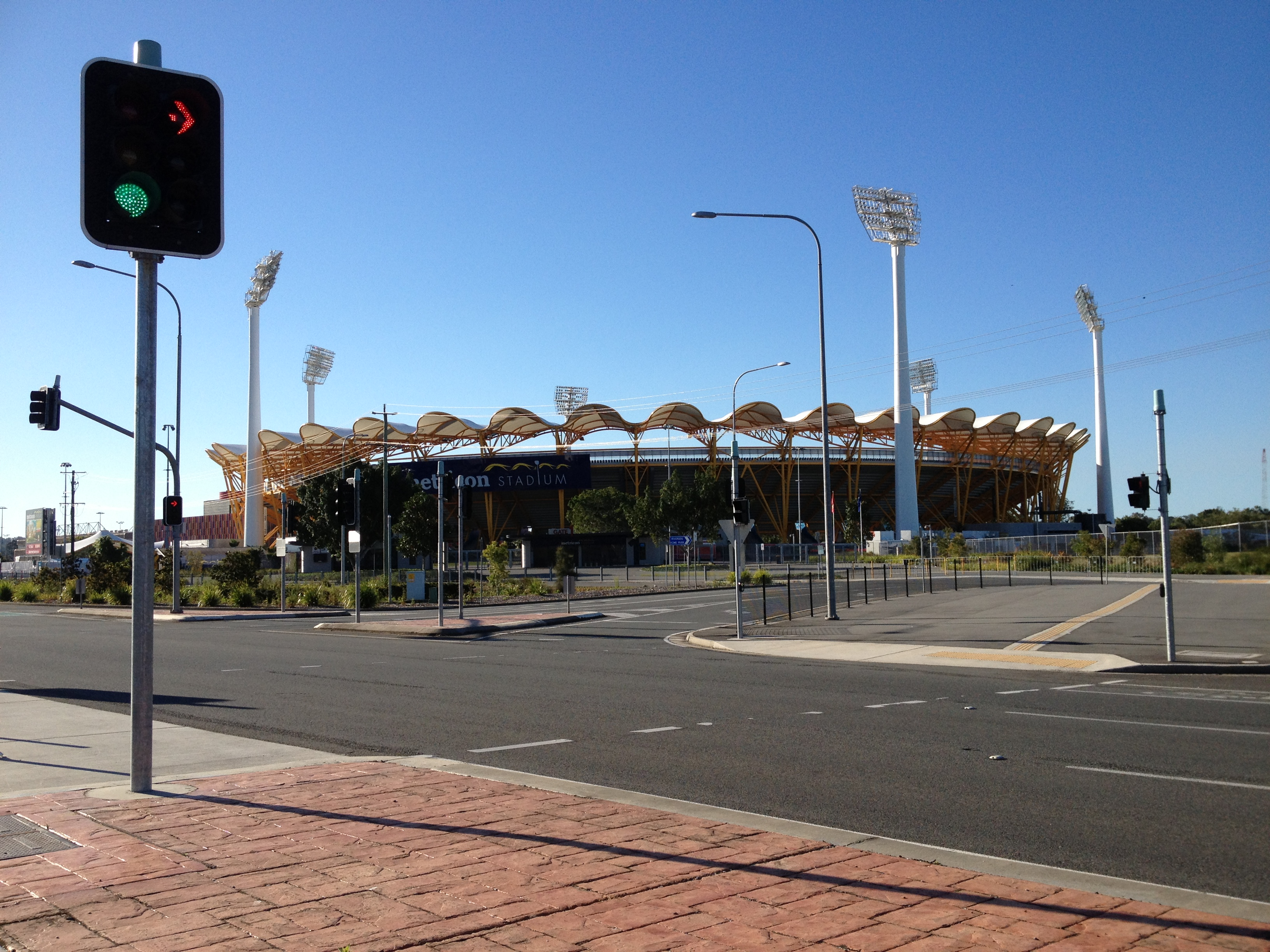
The exterior of Carrara Stadium.

The Gold Coast Sports Precinct is a series of sports facilities and venues, located on the Gold Coast, Queensland, in Australia.

The precinct has hosted professional sports such as Australian rules football, baseball, basketball, cricket, rugby league and rugby union in the past. It hosted the athletics, badminton, weightlifting and wrestling events in the 2018 Commonwealth Games as well as the opening and closing ceremonies.

== History ==
The site of the precinct is on the former farming property 'Birribon' owned by the Cooper family and frequently visited by Sydney Barber Josiah Skertchly.

In 1983 the Nerang Bulls Rugby Union Club began using Carrara Oval but relocated to Nerang a year later. In 1986 it was announced the Brisbane Bears were granted a licence to enter the Victorian Football League and Billionaire owner Christopher Skase decided to base the team at Carrara Oval. Skase redeveloped the oval into a stadium with makeshift stands intended to maximize television viewership. By the beginning of the 1987 VFL season, the newly created Carrara Stadium would hold a maximum seated capacity of 16,500.

In 1989, Skase orchestrated the instalment of $6 million flood lights which were never paid for. Upon the collapse of Skase's company Qintex, he would flee the country to Spain and the flood lights would continue to be unpaid. Liquidators would attempt to extract money from the Gold Coast City Council for the lights, but after an unsuccessful trial it was found cheaper to leave the flood lights at Carrara Stadium. On 15 July 1989 the Bears hosted the first ever night match at Carrara against the Geelong Cats in front of a then record crowd of 18,198.

The Gold Coast Rollers basketball team were announced to join the National Basketball League in 1990 and the Carrara Indoor Stadium was built to house the team. A newly formed Baseball team named the Gold Coast Clippers also began using Carrara Stadium in 1990 during the summer months. The Bears would relocate to the Gabba permanently in 1992 after years of financial hardship at Carrara. After several name changes and a relocation, the Baseball team now known as the Gold Coast Cougars returned to Carrara Stadium in 1993. The indoor stadium underwent major upgrades in 1996 to the tune of $800,000 in an attempt attract a bigger audience to Rollers' basketball games. The Rollers would fold later that year due to financial struggles.

A newly created National Rugby League team known as the Gold Coast Chargers would take up tenancy at Carrara Stadium in 1996. The Chargers would only last three seasons before folding in 1998. Now the only team still remaining at Carrara, the Cougars won the 1998–99 ABL Championship. The ABL would be disbanded following the season and the Cougars were no more. Professional sport returned to the precinct in 2007 when the Gold Coast Titans took up tenancy at Carrara Stadium. The following year saw the Titans move to their newly created stadium in Robina.

In 2009 the Gold Coast Football Club was created and based themselves at the precinct. A major redevelopment of Carrara Stadium began in 2010 which was followed by a successful bid on the 2018 Commonwealth Games in 2011. The precinct then began to take shape in the lead up to the Games with the creation of new venues and facilities. In October 2020, the Brisbane Roar moved their training base to the Gold Coast Sports Precinct. In May 2022, the National BMX Freestyle Park opened within the precinct.

== Teams ==
- Gold Coast Football Club, nicknamed the Suns, the team competes in the Australian Football League and play out of Carrara Stadium.
- Brisbane Roar train at the Elite Field 1, compete in the A-League and play home games at Dolphin Oval.
- Titans Netball compete in the Sapphire Series and play home games at the Sports and Leisure Centre.

=== Former teams ===
Team	Sport	Used	Competition	Years
Brisbane Bears	Australian rules football	Carrara Stadium	Australian Football League	1987–92
Gold Coast Clippers	Baseball	Carrara Stadium	Australian Baseball League	1989–90
Gold Coast Dolphins	Cricket	Carrara Stadium	Queensland Premier Cricket	1990–93
Gold Coast Rollers	Basketball	Carrara Indoor Stadium	National Basketball League	1990–96
Daikyo Dolphins	Baseball	Carrara Stadium	Australian Baseball League	1992–93
Gold Coast Cougars	Baseball	Carrara Stadium	Australian Baseball League	1993–99
Gold Coast Chargers	Rugby league	Carrara Stadium	National Rugby League	1996–98
Gold Coast Titans	Rugby league	Carrara Stadium	National Rugby League	2007
East Coast Aces	Rugby union	Carrara Stadium	Australian Rugby Championship	2007
Gold Coast Blaze	Basketball	Carrara Indoor Stadium (training)	National Basketball League	2007–12
Gold Coast United	Soccer	Western Fields (training)	A-League	2011–12

== Sports facilities ==
=== Current facilities ===
- Carrara Stadium (capacity: 25,000; outdoor), the premier venue for Australian rules football and cricket, and occasionally other entertainment events. The Gold Coast Football Club hold management rights over the stadium and are currently the only tenants of the venue. Prior to the 2010 redevelopment, the ground played host to a number of rugby league teams such as the Gold Coast Chargers and the Gold Coast Titans while defunct AFL side the Brisbane Bears were also former tenants of the stadium.
- Gold Coast Sports and Leisure Centre (capacity: 5,000; indoor), a basketball and netball venue that is used by Gold Coast Basketball and includes the Gold Coast Suns' training/administration facilities as well as a synthetic grass oval.
- Carrara Indoor Stadium (capacity: 2,992; indoor), a multipurpose venue that is located next door to Carrara Stadium. Serves as the Headquarters for Squash Australia as of 2018.
- Carrara Elite Field 1 (outdoor) known as Austworld Centre Oval for sponsorship reasons, the premier oval that is predominately used for Australian rules football training and some Victorian Football League matches.
- Carrara Eastern Oval (outdoor), an Australian rules football oval that is used primarily as a training ground for the Gold Coast Suns academy.
- Carrara Southern Sports Fields (outdoor), a series of football (soccer) fields that are used by Gold Coast Soccer located on the southern side of the precinct.
- Carrara Cricket Nets (outdoor), a cricket training facility located on the outside of Carrara Stadium.
- KDV Sport Academy (outdoor), a golf and tennis academy that includes a 12-hole golf course, 12 Italian clay tennis courts and 8 plexipave hard tennis courts.
- National BMX Freestyle Park (outdoor), a BMX training and competition facility featuring walls of up to 5.2 metres high and includes quarter pipes, big spine, step up, fat spine, box jump, half bowl and transfers.

== See also ==
- Sports on the Gold Coast, Queensland
