= Australian Baseball League awards =

This is a list of award winners from the now-defunct Australian Baseball League (1989-1999).

== Batting Champion ==
Year	Player	Team
1989/90	David Clarkson	Waverley Reds
1990/91	John Jaha	Daikyo Dolphins
1991/92	Paul Gorman	Daikyo Dolphins
1992/93	Kevin Jordan	Brisbane Bandits
1993/94	Homer Bush	Brisbane Bandits
1994/95	David Nilsson	Waverley Reds
1995/96	Adam Burton	Brisbane Bandits
1996/97	Andrew Scott	Adelaide Giants
1997/98	Brendan Kingman	Sydney Storm
1998/99	Adam Burton	Melbourne Reds

== Golden Glove ==
Year	Player	Team
1989/90	Not Awarded	
1990/91	Billy White	Sydney Wave
1991/92	Mark Shipley	Sydney Blues
1992/93	Mark Shipley	Sydney Blues
1993/94	Andrew Scott	Adelaide Giants
1994/95	Geoff Blum	Hunter Eagles
1995/96	Steve Hinton	Brisbane Bandits
1996/97	Mark Shipley	Sydney Blues
1997/98	Glenn Williams	Sydney Storm
1998/99	Gary White	Sydney Storm

== Manager of the Year ==
Year	Manager	Team
1989/90	Phil Dale	Waverley Reds
1990/91	Adrian Meagher	Daikyo Dolphins
1991/92	Steve Gilmore	Brisbane Bandits
1992/93	Phil Dale	Waverley Reds
1993/94	Tony Harris	Adelaide Giants
1994/95	Paul Runge	Waverley Reds
1995/96	Darren Baisley	Sydney Blues
1996/97	Tony Harris	Adelaide Giants
1997/98	Tom Nieto	Melbourne Reds
1998/99	Tony Harris	Adelaide Giants

== Most Valuable Player ==
Year	Player	Team
1989/90	Phil Dale	Waverley Reds
1990/91	David Nilsson	Daikyo Dolphins
1991/92	Adrian Meagher	Daikyo Dolphins
1992/93	Kevin Jordan	Daikyo Dolphins
1993/94	Homer Bush	Brisbane Bandits
1994/95	Scott Metcalf	Perth Heat
1995/96	Gary White	Sydney Blues
1996/97	Andrew Scott	Adelaide Giants
1997/98	Brendan Kingman	Sydney Storm
1998/99	Adam Burton	Melbourne Reds

== Rookie of the Year ==
Year	Player	Team
1989/90	Jason Marks	Parramatta Patriots
1990/91	Myles Barnden	Waverley Reds
1991/92	Scott Metcalf	Perth Heat
1992/93	Andrew Spencer	Waverley Reds
1993/94	Kristian Feledyk	Sydney Blues
1994/95	Todd Le-Grand	Hunter Eagles
1995/96	Tom Becker	Adelaide Giants
1996/97	Robbie Wells	Perth Heat
1997/98	Rodney Van Buizen	Hunter Eagles
1998/99	Clinton Balgera	Perth Heat

== Reliever of the Year ==
Year	Player	Team
1989/90	Jim Townsend	Parramatta Patriots
1990/91	Bob Nilsson	Daikyo Dolphins
1991/92	Mark Ettles	Perth Heat
1992/93	Ross Jones	Melbourne Monarchs
1993/94	Ross Jones	Melbourne Monarchs
1994/95	Ross Jones	Melbourne Monarchs
1995/96	Shayne Bennett	Gold Coast Cougars
1996/97	Chuck Beale	Gold Coast Cougars
1997/98	Gabe Molina	Perth Heat
1998/99	Grahame Cassel	Sydney Storm

== Pitcher of the Year ==
Year	Player	Team
1989/90	Phil Dale	Waverley Reds
1990/91	Pat Leinen	Perth Heat
1991/92	Adrian Meagher	Daikyo Dolphins
1992/93	Carlos Reyes	Waverley Reds
1993/94	Brad Cornett	Sydney Blues
1994/95	Phil Dale	Waverley Reds
1995/96	Frankie Rodriguez	Brisbane Bandits
1996/97	Kevin Milwood	Melbourne Monarchs
1997/98	Erick Nelson	Melbourne Monarchs
1998/99	Pat Ahearne	Perth Heat

== Umpire of the Year ==
Year	Umpire	State
1989/90	Not Awarded	
1990/91	Not Awarded	
1991/92	Not Awarded	
1992/93	Not Awarded	
1993/94	Not Awarded	
1994/95	Not Awarded	
1995/96	Gerard Tancred	New South Wales
1996/97	Jeff Brand	South Australia
1997/98	Gerard Tancred	New South Wales
1998/99	Gerard Tancred	New South Wales

== See also ==
- Baseball awards § Australia
