= Gold Coast Dolphins =

Gold Coast Dolphins may refer to:

- Gold Coast Titans, a proposed name for an Australian professional rugby league football team based on the Gold Coast in Queensland
- Daikyo Dolphins or Gold Coast Clippers, a foundation team in the now defunct Australian Baseball League
- Gold Coast District Cricket Club or the Gold Coast Dolphins, a team in the Queensland Cricket XXXX Gold A Grade Competition
