= Auburn Stadium =

Auburn Stadium may refer to:

- Auburn Stadium (New South Wales), now Oriole Park, Sydney, Australia.
- Auburn Stadium (Alabama), now Jordan–Hare Stadium, Auburn, Alabama, United States.
