= Sydney Metros =

Information
- League: Australian Baseball League (1989-1999)
- Location: Sydney
- Ballpark: Sydney Football Stadium
- Founded: 1989
- Folded: 1990
- Nickname(s): Metros
- League championships: 0
- 1989-90: 3-36 (8th)

Current uniforms
Home	Away

The Sydney Metros were one of the eight foundation teams of the now defunct Australian Baseball League. They disbanded after the 1989–90 season due to heavy financial losses and sold their licence to the Sydney Wave.

The Metros played out of the Sydney Football Stadium, Moore Park, but won no games at the venue, finishing their first and only season with a win% of just .077, just over 30 games behind the Waverley Reds.

== History ==
Season	Finish
1989-90	8th

== See also ==
- Sport in Australia
- Australian Baseball
- Australian Baseball League (1989-1999)
