= Canberra Bushrangers =

Information
- League: Australian Baseball League (1989-1999)
- Location: Canberra, Australia
- Ballpark: Bruce Stadium
- Founded: 1991-92
- Folded: 1994-95
- Nickname(s): Bushrangers
- League championships: 0
- 1994-95: ?-? (?)
- Former name(s): Melbourne Bushrangers (1991-93)
- Former ballparks: Melbourne Ballpark (1991-93)
- Colours: White and Navy Blue

Current uniforms
Home	Away

The Canberra Bushrangers were originally created as the Melbourne Bushrangers, To replace the Melbourne Monarchs in the 1991-92 Australian Baseball League Championship after the Monarchs were expelled from the competition.

The Bushrangers were based in Melbourne at the Melbourne Ballpark as well as playing a few games in Ballarat until they relocated to Canberra for the 1993-94 championship, the season after the Monarchs had been reformed. The Bushrangers played for a further two seasons in Canberra at Bruce Stadium until they folded due to heavy financial losses after the 1994-95 championship.

== Results ==
=== 1993–1995 results ===
Season	Finish
1993–94	7th
1994–95	8th

== See also ==
- Sport in Australia
- Australian Baseball
- Australian Baseball League (1989-1999)
