= Allen McDill =

American baseball player (born 1971)

- Pitcher
- Born: August 23, 1971 (age 53); Greenville, Mississippi, U.S.
- Batted: Left Threw: Left

MLB debut
- May 15, 1997, for the Kansas City Royals

Last MLB appearance
- October 2, 2001, for the Boston Red Sox

MLB statistics
- Games pitched: 38
- Earned run average: 7.79
- Strikeouts: 28

Teams
- Kansas City Royals (1997–1998); Detroit Tigers (2000); Boston Red Sox (2001)

Allen Gabriel McDill (born August 23, 1971) is a former left-handed specialist in Major League Baseball who pitched from 1997 through 2001 for the Kansas City Royals (1997–98), Detroit Tigers (2000) and Boston Red Sox (2001).

McDill attended Arkansas Tech University. In 1991, he played collegiate summer baseball with the Wareham Gatemen of the Cape Cod Baseball League.

In a four-season major league career, McDill posted a 7.79 ERA in 38 appearances, including 11 games finished, 28 strikeouts, 18 walks, 38 hits allowed, and 34 2/3 innings of work, without gaining a decision or save.

From 1992 to 2002, McDill also pitched for the Mets (1992–95), Royals (1995–97), Rangers (1999, 2002), Tigers (2000), Cardinals (2000), Red Sox (2001) and Orioles (2002) minor league systems. In 392 appearances, he posted a 46–46 record with a 3.75 ERA and 42 saves.

== Milestone ==
- While pitching for the 1995 Melbourne Monarchs of the Australian Baseball League threw a seven-inning no-hitter against the Gold Coast Cougars.

== See also ==
- Boston Red Sox all-time roster
