= Parramatta Patriots =

Information
- League: Australian Baseball League (1989–1999)
- Location: Parramatta
- Ballpark: Oriole Park
- Founded: 1989–90
- Folded: 1991
- Nickname(s): Patriots
- League championships: 0
- 1990–91: 16-26 (5th)

Current uniforms
Home	Away

The Parramatta Patriots were one of the eight foundation teams of the now defunct Australian Baseball League. They disbanded after the 1990–91 season due to heavy financial losses and were replaced by the Sydney Blues in the following season.

== History ==
Season	Finish
1989–90	3rd
1990–91	5th

== See also ==
- Sport in Australia
- Australian Baseball
- Australian Baseball League (1989–1999)
