= Sydney Wave =

Information
- League: Australian Baseball League (1989–1999)
- Location: Sydney
- Ballpark: Belmore Oval
- Founded: 1990
- Folded: 1992
- Nickname: Wave
- 1991-92: 17-27 (7th)
- Former ballpark: Parramatta Stadium

Current uniforms
Home	Away

The Sydney Wave were formed after the first Australian Baseball League championship purchasing the Sydney Metros licence. The Wave had a bit more luck than the Metros lasting a further two seasons, both at different stadiums, before disbanding due to not having a lit stadium and selling their licence to the Hunter Eagles.

== Results ==
=== 1990–1992 results ===
Season	Finish
1990–91	6th
1991–92	7th

== See also ==
- Sport in Australia
- Australian Baseball
- Australian Baseball League (1989-1999)
