= 1992–93 Australian Baseball League season =

The 1992–93 Australian Baseball League Championship was won by the Melbourne Monarchs who were back after being expelled from the league in 1990. The Monarchs defeated Perth Heat in 2 games to take out the championship.

== Ladder ==
Team	Played	Wins	Loss	Win %
Melbourne Monarchs				
Perth Heat				
Sydney Blues				
Waverley Reds				
5th				
6th				
7th				
8th				

== Championship series ==
=== Semi Final 1: Game 1: 1st Vs 4th at Parry Field ===
Team	1	2	3	4	5	6	7	8	9	R	H	E
Waverley Reds	?	?	?	?	?	?	?	?	?	?	?	?
Perth Heat	?	?	?	?	?	?	?	?	?	?	?	?
WP: ? (1–0) LP: ? (0–1) Sv: ? Home runs: Reds: ? Heat: ?

=== Semi Final 1: Game 2: 1st Vs 4th at Parry Field ===
Team	1	2	3	4	5	6	7	8	9	R	H	E
Waverley Reds	?	?	?	?	?	?	?	?	?	?	?	?
Perth Heat	?	?	?	?	?	?	?	?	?	?	?	?
WP: ? (1–0) LP: ? (0–1) Sv: ? Home runs: Reds: ? Heat: ?

=== Semi Final 2: Game 1: 2nd Vs 3rd at Melbourne Ballpark ===
Team	1	2	3	4	5	6	7	8	9	R	H	E
Sydney Blues	?	?	?	?	?	?	?	?	?	?	?	?
Melb. Monarchs	?	?	?	?	?	?	?	?	?	?	?	?
WP: ? (1–0) LP: ? (0–1) Sv: ? Home runs: Blues: ? Monarchs: ?

=== Semi Final 2: Game 2: 2nd Vs 3rd at Melbourne Ballpark ===
Team	1	2	3	4	5	6	7	8	9	R	H	E
Sydney Blues	?	?	?	?	?	?	?	?	?	?	?	?
Melb. Monarchs	?	?	?	?	?	?	?	?	?	?	?	?
WP: ? (1–0) LP: ? (0–1) Sv: ? Home runs: Blues: ? Monarchs: ?

=== Semi Final 2: Game 3: 2nd Vs 3rd at Melbourne Ballpark ===
Team	1	2	3	4	5	6	7	8	9	R	H	E
Sydney Blues	?	?	?	?	?	?	?	?	?	?	?	?
Melb. Monarchs	?	?	?	?	?	?	?	?	?	?	?	?
WP: ? (1–0) LP: ? (0–1) Sv: ? Home runs: Blues: ? Monarchs: ?

=== Final Series: Game 1: Winner Semi Final 1 Vs Winner Semi Final 2 at Parry Field ===
Team	1	2	3	4	5	6	7	8	9	R	H	E
Melb. Monarchs	?	?	?	?	?	?	?	?	?	14	?	?
Perth Heat	?	?	?	?	?	?	?	?	?	2	?	?
WP: ? (1–0) LP: ? (0–1) Sv: ? Home runs: Monarchs: ? Heat: ?

=== Final Series: Game 2: Winner Semi Final 1 Vs Winner Semi Final 2 at Parry Field ===
20 February 1993

Team	1	2	3	4	5	6	7	8	9	R	H	E
Melb. Monarchs	0	0	0	0	0	0	0	1	0	1	6	1
Perth Heat	0	0	0	0	0	0	0	0	0	0	4	1
WP: LEMON (1–0) LP: DEDRICK (0–1) Sv: JONES; Home runs: Monarchs: 0 Heat: 0

== Awards ==
Award	Person	Team
Most Valuable Player	Kevin Jordan	Brisbane Bandits
Championship M.V.P.	Don Lemon	Melbourne Monarchs
Golden Glove	Mark Shipley	Sydney Wave
Batting Champion	Kevin Jordan	Brisbane Bandits
Pitcher of the Year	Carlos Reyes	Waverley Reds
Rookie of the Year	Andrew Spencer	Waverley Reds
Manager of the Year		

== Top Stats ==
Defensive Stats
Name	Wins	Losses	Saves	ERA
Ross Jones	1	1	13	1.11
Barry Parrisoto	8	4	0	2.04
Don Lemon	6	4	0	2.26
Mark Respondek	5	2	0	2.39

Offensive Stars
Name	Avg	HR	RBI
Keith Gogos	.426	2	13
Ron Carothers	.315	3	27
Jon Deeble	.300	0	11
Richard Vagg	.280	1	19

== All-Star Team ==
Position	Name	Team
Catcher	Kevin Scott	Melbourne Bushrangers
1st Base	Tony Adamson	Perth Heat
2nd Base	Kevin Jordan	Brisbane Bandits
3rd Base	Tim Holland	Perth Heat
Short Stop	Greg Jelks	Perth Heat
Out Field	Mike Harris	Gold Cost Cougars
Out Field	Ron Carothers	Melbourne Monarchs
Out Field	Duane Singleton	Gold Coast Cougars
Designated Hitter	John Moore	Perth Heat
Starting Pitcher	Carlos Reyes	Waverley Reds
Relief Pitcher	Ross Jones	Melbourne Monarchs
Manager	Doug Ault	Sydney Blues
