= 1990–91 Australian Baseball League season =

The 1990–91 Australian Baseball League championship was won by Perth Heat who defeated the Daikyo Dolphins 3–2 in the 5 game championship series.

== Ladder ==
| Team | Played | Wins | Loss | Win % |
|---|---|---|---|---|
| Perth Heat | 5 | 3 | 2 | |
| Daikyo Dolphins | 5 | 2 | 3 | |
| 3rd | | | | |
| 4th | | | | |
| 5th | | | | |
| 6th | | | | |
| 7th | | | | |
| 8th | | | | |

== Championship series ==
=== Final Series: Game 1: 1st Vs 2nd at Parry Field ===
| Team | 1 | 2 | 3 | 4 | 5 | 6 | 7 | 8 | 9 | R | H | E |
|---|---|---|---|---|---|---|---|---|---|---|---|---|
| Daikyo Dolphins | ? | ? | ? | ? | ? | ? | ? | ? | ? | 4 | ? | ? |
| Perth Heat | ? | ? | ? | ? | ? | ? | ? | ? | ? | 6 | ? | ? |
WP: ? (1-0) LP: ? (0-1) Sv: ? Home runs: Dolphins: ? Heat: ?

=== Final Series: Game 2: 1st Vs 2nd at Parry Field ===
| Team | 1 | 2 | 3 | 4 | 5 | 6 | 7 | 8 | 9 | R | H | E |
|---|---|---|---|---|---|---|---|---|---|---|---|---|
| Daikyo Dolphins | ? | ? | ? | ? | ? | ? | ? | ? | ? | 3 | ? | ? |
| Perth Heat | ? | ? | ? | ? | ? | ? | ? | ? | ? | 7 | ? | ? |
WP: ? (1-0) LP: ? (0-1) Sv: ? Home runs: Dolphins: ? Heat: ?

=== Final Series: Game 3: 1st Vs 2nd at Palm Meadows ===
| Team | 1 | 2 | 3 | 4 | 5 | 6 | 7 | 8 | 9 | R | H | E |
|---|---|---|---|---|---|---|---|---|---|---|---|---|
| Perth Heat | ? | ? | ? | ? | ? | ? | ? | ? | ? | 3 | ? | ? |
| Daikyo Dolphins | ? | ? | ? | ? | ? | ? | ? | ? | ? | 4 | ? | ? |
WP: ? (1-0) LP: ? (0-1) Sv: ? Home runs: Heat: ? Dolphins: ?

=== Final Series: Game 4: 1st Vs 2nd at Palm Meadows ===
| Team | 1 | 2 | 3 | 4 | 5 | 6 | 7 | 8 | 9 | R | H | E |
|---|---|---|---|---|---|---|---|---|---|---|---|---|
| Perth Heat | ? | ? | ? | ? | ? | ? | ? | ? | ? | 2 | ? | ? |
| Daikyo Dolphins | ? | ? | ? | ? | ? | ? | ? | ? | ? | 6 | ? | ? |
WP: ? (1-0) LP: ? (0-1) Sv: ? Home runs: Heat: ? Dolphins: ?

=== Final Series: Game 5: 1st Vs 2nd at Palm Meadows ===
| Team | 1 | 2 | 3 | 4 | 5 | 6 | 7 | 8 | 9 | R | H | E |
|---|---|---|---|---|---|---|---|---|---|---|---|---|
| Perth Heat | ? | ? | ? | ? | ? | ? | ? | ? | ? | 11 | ? | ? |
| Daikyo Dolphins | ? | ? | ? | ? | ? | ? | ? | ? | ? | 1 | ? | ? |
WP: ? (1-0) LP: ? (0-1) Sv: ? Home runs: Heat: ? Dolphins: ?

== Awards ==
| Award | Person | Team |
|---|---|---|
| Most Valuable Player | David Nilsson | Daikyo Dolphins |
| Championship M.V.P. | Graeme Lloyd | Perth Heat |
| Golden Glove | Billy White | Sydney Wave |
| Batting Champion | John Jaha | Daikyo Dolphin |
| Rookie of the Year | Pat Leinen | Perth Heat |
| Pitcher of the Year | Myles Barnden | Waverley Reds |
| Manager of the Year | | |

== Top Stats ==
Defensive Stats
| Name | Wins | Losses | Saves | ERA |
|---|---|---|---|---|
| Dave Rusin | 3 | 1 | 0 | 1.80 |
| Graeme Lloyd | 9 | 4 | 0 | 2.62 |
| Simon Eissens | 4 | 1 | 0 | 2.81 |
| Pat Leinen | 11 | 3 | 0 | 2.86 |
| Parris Mitchell | 5 | 2 | 1 | 3.76 |
| Todd Stephan | 8 | 3 | 2 | 5.34 |

Offensive Stars
| Name | Avg | HR | RBI |
|---|---|---|---|
| T.R. Lewis | .394 | 5 | 32 |
| Tony Adamson | .379 | 17 | 54 |
| Tim Holland | .370 | 7 | 39 |
| James Waddell | .329 | 1 | 14 |
| Shaun Hrabar | .303 | 0 | 7 |
| Michael Moyle | .295 | 5 | 25 |

== All-Star Team ==
| Position | Name | Team |
|---|---|---|
| Catcher | David Nilsson | Daikyo Dolphins |
| 1st Base | John Jaha | Daikyo Dolphins |
| 2nd Base | Andrew Scott | Adelaide Giants |
| 3rd Base | T.R. Lewis | Perth Heat |
| Short Stop | Billy White | Sydney Wave |
| Out Field | Ron Carothers | Waverley Reds |
| Out Field | Tim Holland | Perth Heat |
| Out Field | Wayne Harvey | Parramatta Patriots |
| Designated Hitter | Ron Johnson | Daikyo Dolphins |
| Starting Pitcher | Pat Leinen | Perth Heat |
| Relief Pitcher | Bob Nilsson | Daikyo Dolphins |
| Manager | Phil Alexander | Adelaide Giants |
