= 1993–94 Australian Baseball League season =

The 1993–94 Australian Baseball League Championship was won by the Brisbane Bandits who after finishing 3rd defeated Perth Heat to meet the Sydney Blues in the championship series where they won the Championship in 2 games.

== Ladder ==
Team	Played	Wins	Loss	Win %
Brisbane Bandits		34	21	
Sydney Blues		35	19	
Perth Heat		36	20	
Adelaide Giants		30	26	
Melbourne Monarchs		29	26	
Waverley Reds		22	31	
Canberra Bushrangers		17	38	
East Coast Cougars		15	37	

== Championship series ==
=== Semi Final 1: Game 1: 1st Vs 4th at Parramatta Stadium ===
11 February 1994

Team	1	2	3	4	5	6	7	8	9	R	H	E
Adelaide Giants	0	1	0	0	0	0	0	0	0	1	4	0
Sydney Blues	1	0	0	0	0	0	1	0	0	2	9	0
WP: CORNETT (1-0) LP: SCOBLE (0-1) Sv: CASSEL; Home runs: Giants: 0 Blues: 0

=== Semi Final 1: Game 2: 1st Vs 4th at Parramatta Stadium ===
Team	1	2	3	4	5	6	7	8	9	R	H	E
Adelaide Giants	?	?	?	?	?	?	?	?	?	?	?	?
Sydney Blues	?	?	?	?	?	?	?	?	?	?	?	?
WP: ? (1-0) LP: ? (0-1) Sv: ? Home runs: Giants: ? Blues: ?

=== Semi Final 2: Game 1: 2nd Vs 3rd at Parry Field ===
Team	1	2	3	4	5	6	7	8	9	R	H	E
Brisbane Bandits	?	?	?	?	?	?	?	?	?	?	?	?
Perth Heat	?	?	?	?	?	?	?	?	?	?	?	?
WP: ? (1-0) LP: ? (0-1) Sv: ? Home runs: Bandits: ? Heat: ?

=== Semi Final 2: Game 2: 2nd Vs 3rd at Parry Field ===
Team	1	2	3	4	5	6	7	8	9	R	H	E
Brisbane Bandits	?	?	?	?	?	?	?	?	?	?	?	?
Perth Heat	?	?	?	?	?	?	?	?	?	?	?	?
WP: ? (1-0) LP: ? (0-1) Sv: ? Home runs: Bandits: ? Heat: ?

=== Semi Final 2: Game 3: 2nd Vs 3rd at Parry Field ===
Team	1	2	3	4	5	6	7	8	9	R	H	E
Brisbane Bandits	?	?	?	?	?	?	?	?	?	?	?	?
Perth Heat	?	?	?	?	?	?	?	?	?	?	?	?
WP: ? (1-0) LP: ? (0-1) Sv: ? Home runs: Bandits: ? Heat: ?

=== Final Series: Game 1: Winner Semi Final 1 Vs Winner Semi Final 2 at Parramatta Stadium ===
Team	1	2	3	4	5	6	7	8	9	R	H	E
Brisbane Bandits	?	?	?	?	?	?	?	?	?	5	?	?
Sydney Blues	?	?	?	?	?	?	?	?	?	1	?	?
WP: ? (1-0) LP: ? (0-1) Sv: ? Home runs: Bandits: ? Blues: ?

=== Final Series: Game 2: Winner Semi Final 1 Vs Winner Semi Final 2 at Parramatta Stadium ===
Team	1	2	3	4	5	6	7	8	9	R	H	E
Brisbane Bandits	?	?	?	?	?	?	?	?	?	10	?	?
Sydney Blues	?	?	?	?	?	?	?	?	?	9	?	?
WP: ? (1-0) LP: ? (0-1) Sv: ? Home runs: Bandits: ? Blues: ?

== Awards ==
Award	Person	Team
Most Valuable Player	Homer Bush	Brisbane Bandits
Championship M.V.P.	Leon Glenn	Brisbane Bandits
Golden Glove	Andrew Scott	Adelaide Giants
Batting Champion	Homer Bush	Brisbane Bandits
Pitcher of the Year	Brad Cornett	Sydney Blues
Rookie of the Year	Kristian Feledyk	Sydney Blues
Manager of the Year		

== Top Stats ==
Defensive Stats
Name	Wins	Losses	Saves	ERA
Andy Paul	8	4	1	2.81
Kim Jessop	5	4	0	2.79
David Gooda	3	1	0	3.04
Brian Hancock	7	5	0	4.40
Gary Nilsson	2	2	0	2.42

Offensive Stars
Name	Avg	HR	RBI
Homer Bush	.372	1	16
David Nilsson	.362	12	47
Leon Glenn	.333	10	36
Steve Hinton	.303	7	33
Ron Johnson	.294	14	41

== All-Star Team ==
Position	Name	Team
Catcher	David Nilsson	Brisbane Bandits
1st Base	Jay Kirkpatrick	Adelaide Giants
2nd Base	Homer Bush	Brisbane Bandits
3rd Base	Brendan Kingman	Sydney Blues
Short Stop	Greg Jelks	Perth Heat
Out Field	Curtis Goodwin	Perth Heat
Out Field	Leon Glenn	Brisbane Bandits
Out Field	Barrie Bahnert	Adelaide Giants
Designated Hitter	Tony Adamson	Perth Heat
Starting Pitcher	Brad Cornett	Sydney Blues
Relief Pitcher	Ross Jones	Melbourne Monarchs
Manager	Tony Harris	Adelaide Giants
