= Oriole Park (Sydney) =

Park in Auburn, Sydney, Australia

- Oriole Park shortly after construction finished
- Interactive map of Oriole Park
- Former names: Auburn Stadium
- Location: Euston Road, Auburn, New South Wales 2144
- Coordinates: 33°51′8″S 151°1′3″E
- Surface: Grass
- Field size: Left Field - 328 feet (100 m); Left-Center - 368 feet (112 m); Center Field - 380 feet (120 m); Right-Center - 368 feet (112 m); Right Field - 328 feet (100 m)

Construction
- Opened: 1960s
- Renovated: 1980
- Closed: 2014
- Demolished: 2017

Tenants
- Auburn Baseball Club; Parramatta Patriots (ABL) 1989-1991

Oriole Park is a park in Auburn, a western suburb of the Australian metropolis Sydney. It is named after a baseball stadium that used to be there and which was the home of the Auburn Baseball Club, known as Auburn Orioles, which are now merged with Macarthur Colts to form the Macarthur Orioles.

The stadium hosted the interstate competition Claxton Shield in 1970, 1975, 1980, and 1981. The field was extended and had lighting added prior to hosting the 1980 competition. Oriole Park was alongside the Flat Rock baseball diamond in Willoughby one of the two venues of the VIII Baseball World Junior Championship 1988.

Auburn's Oriole Park was a contender to become a venue for the Baseball competition of the Sydney 2000 Olympics, however, eventually it was decided to host those events at the Sydney Showground Stadium and the newly established Blacktown Olympic Park.

The stadium was demolished and removed sometime between 2009 and 2013. The eight floodlight masts were kept standing. Two of them nowadays serve as relays for mobile telephony and the like. In 2017 Cumberland Council announced that an adjacent building which served the stadium and baseball on the ground would be torn down as restoring it would be too expensive.

== Contemporary location images ==
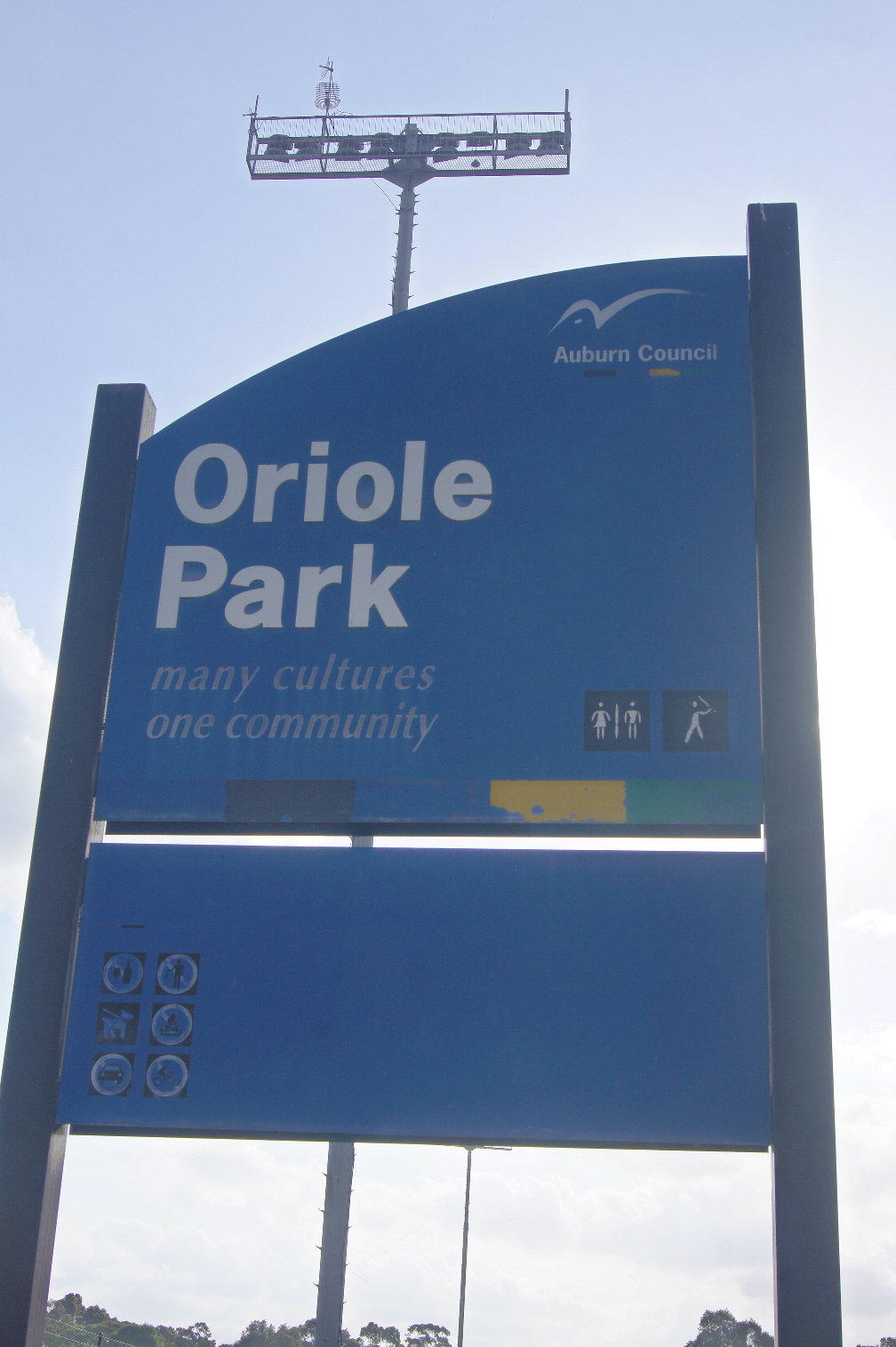
Sign on Euston Street, 2024

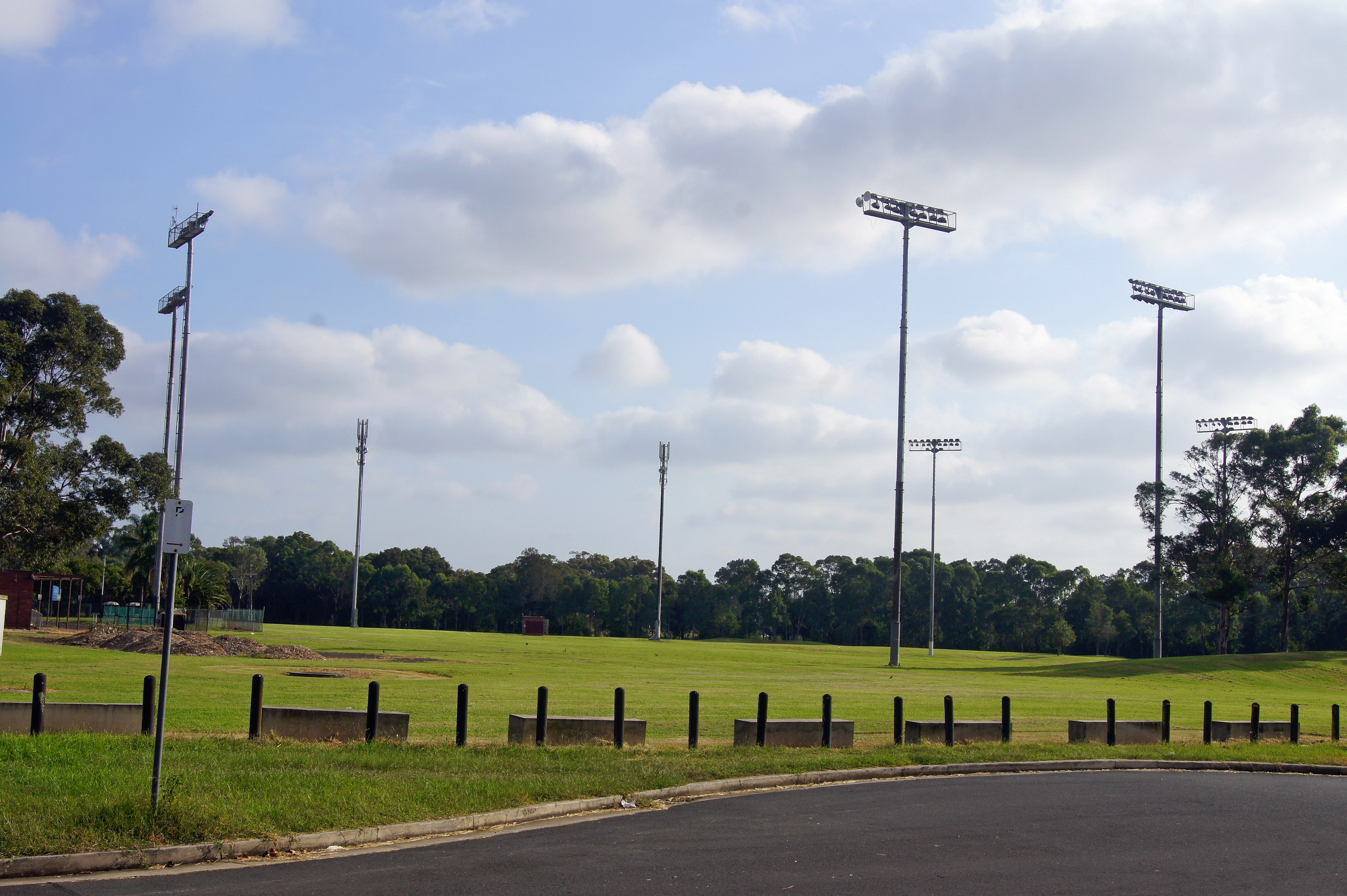
Oriole Park seen from north to south, 2024

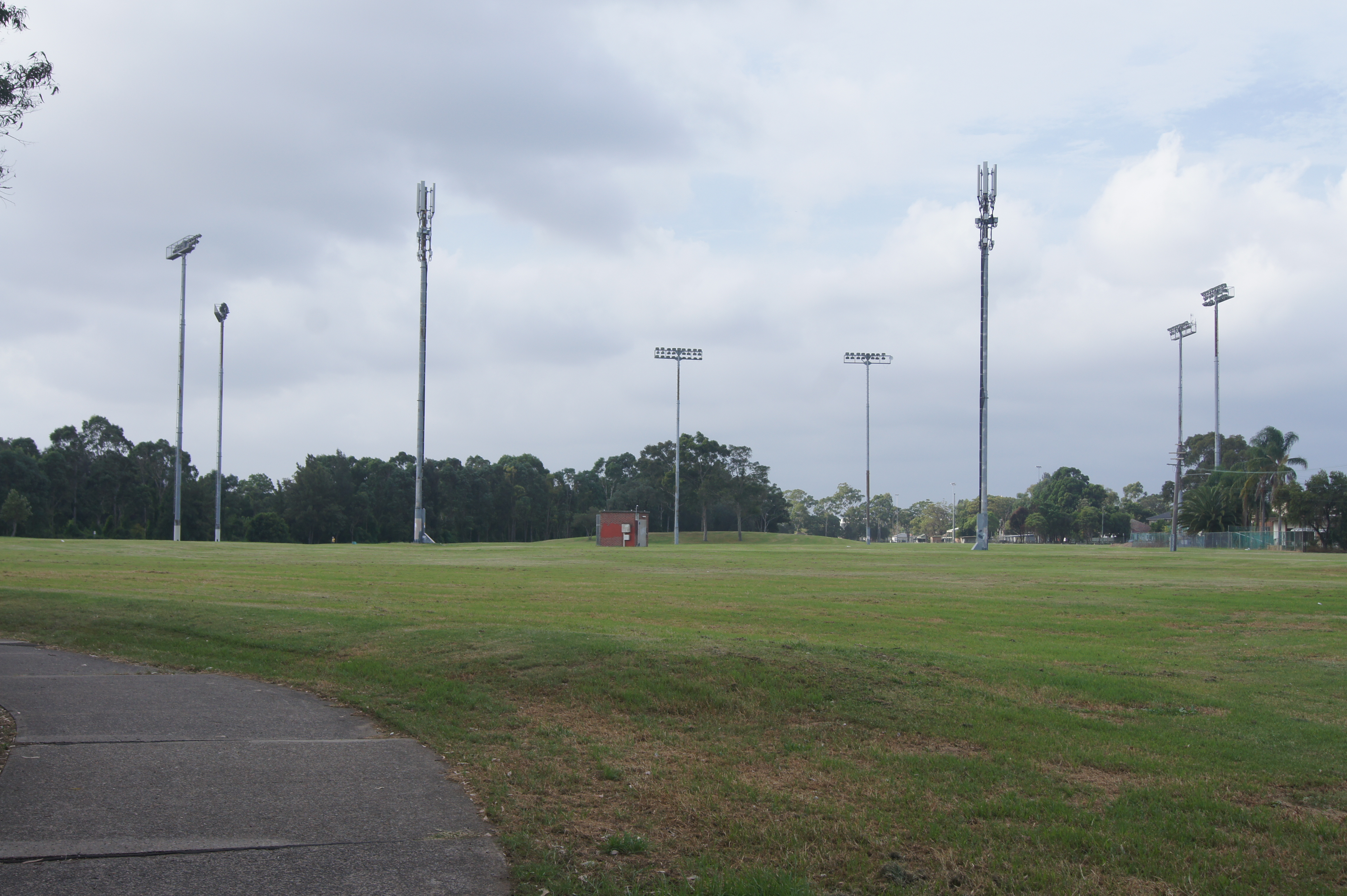
Oriole Park seen from south to north, 2024

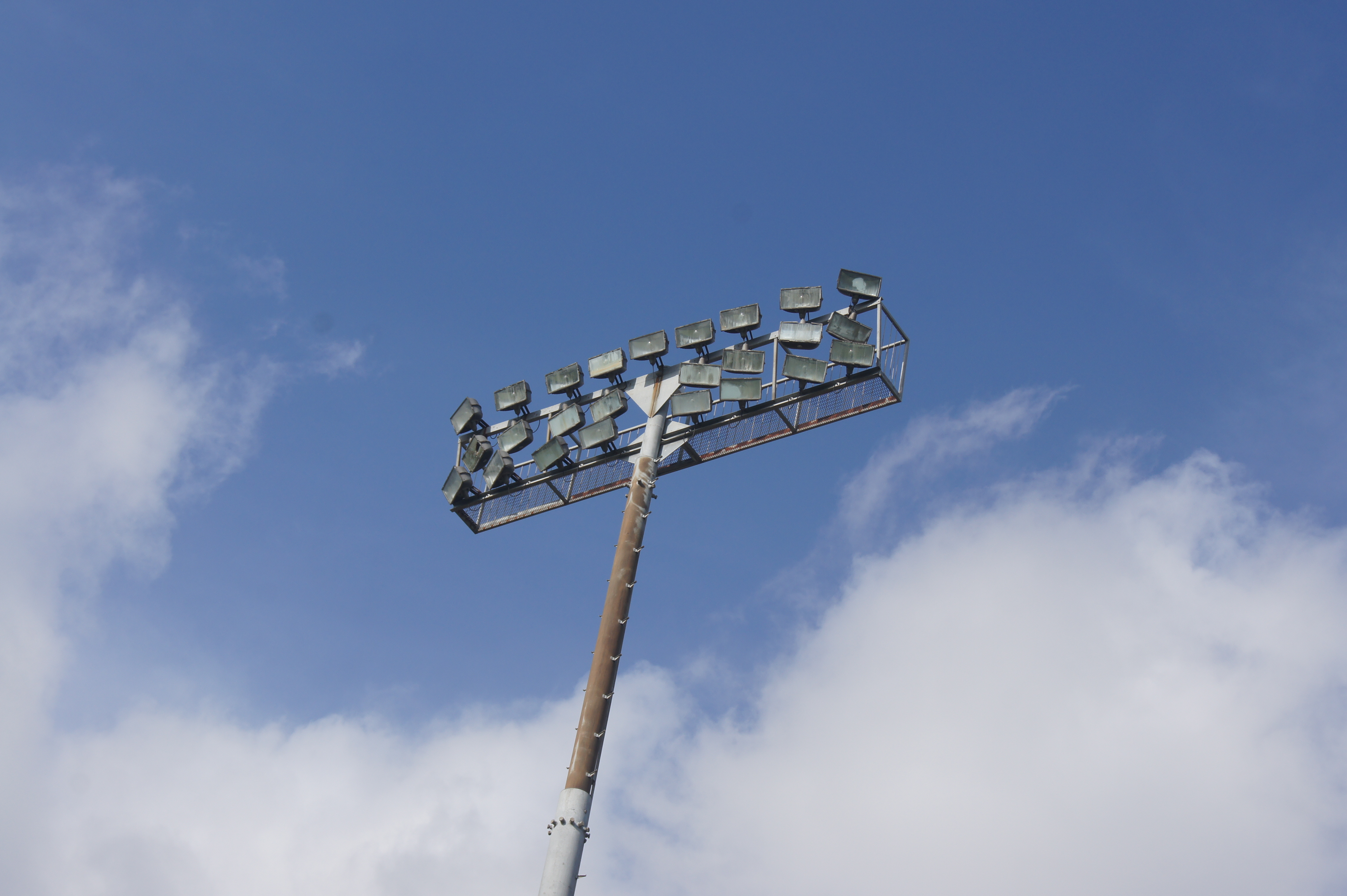
Detail of one of the floodlight masts, 2024
