= Gold Coast Clippers =

Information
- League: Australian Baseball League (1989–1999)
- Location: Gold Coast
- Ballpark: Carrara Stadium
- Founded: 1989–90
- Folded: Changed name to Daikyo Dolphins after first season
- Nickname(s): Clippers
- League championships: 0
- 1989–90: 16–21 (6th)

The Gold Coast Clippers were a foundation team in the now defunct Australian Baseball League. The Clippers changed their name to the Daikyo Dolphins following the signing of a major sponsorship deal with Daikyo to create one of the strongest teams in ABL history.

== History ==
Season	Finish
1989–90	6th

== See also ==
- Sport in Australia
- Australian Baseball
- Australian Baseball League (1989–1999)
