= 1991–92 Australian Baseball League season =

The 1991–92 Australian Baseball League Championship was taken out by the Daikyo Dolphins who defeated Perth Heat 3 game to 1 in the 4 game Championship Series.

== Ladder ==
Team	Played	Wins	Loss	Win %
Daikyo Dolphins				
Perth Heat				
3rd				
4th				
5th				
6th				
7th				
8th				

== Championship series ==
=== Final Series: Game 1: 1st Vs 2nd at Parry Field ===
Team	1	2	3	4	5	6	7	8	9	R	H	E
Daikyo Dolphins	?	?	?	?	?	?	?	?	?	8	?	?
Perth Heat	?	?	?	?	?	?	?	?	?	1	?	?
WP: ? (1-0) LP: ? (0-1) Sv: ? Home runs: Dolphins: ? Heat: ?

=== Final Series: Game 2: 1st Vs 2nd at Parry Field ===
Team	1	2	3	4	5	6	7	8	9	R	H	E
Daikyo Dolphins	?	?	?	?	?	?	?	?	?	17	?	?
Perth Heat	?	?	?	?	?	?	?	?	?	10	?	?
WP: ? (1-0) LP: ? (0-1) Sv: ? Home runs: Dolphins: ? Heat: ?

=== Final Series: Game 3: 1st Vs 2nd at Palm Meadows ===
Team	1	2	3	4	5	6	7	8	9	R	H	E
Perth Heat	?	?	?	?	?	?	?	?	?	7	?	?
Daikyo Dolphins	?	?	?	?	?	?	?	?	?	5	?	?
WP: ? (1-0) LP: ? (0-1) Sv: ? Home runs: Heat: ? Dolphins: ?

=== Final Series: Game 4: 1st Vs 2nd at Palm Meadows ===
Team	1	2	3	4	5	6	7	8	9	R	H	E
Perth Heat	?	?	?	?	?	?	?	?	?	1	?	?
Daikyo Dolphins	?	?	?	?	?	?	?	?	?	11	?	?
WP: ? (1-0) LP: ? (0-1) Sv: ? Home runs: Heat: ? Dolphins: ?

== Awards ==
Award	Person	Team
Most Valuable Player	Adrian Meagher	Daikyo Dolphins
Championship M.V.P.	John Jaha	Daikyo Dolphins
Golden Glove	Mark Shipley	Sydney Wave
Batting Champion	Paul Gorman	Daikyo Dolphins
Pitcher of the Year	Adrian Meagher	Daikyo Dolphins
Rookie of the Year	Scott Metcalf	Perth Heat
Manager of the Year		

== Top Stats ==
Defensive Stats
Name	Wins	Losses	Saves	ERA
Adrian Meagher	13	2	0	1.93
Bob Nilsson	2	3	10	2.68
Gary Nilsson	5	4	0	4.62
Brett Cederblad	6	4	1	4.64
Scott Robinson	2	0	0	5.43
N/A				

Offensive Stars
Name	Avg	HR	RBI
David Nilsson	.403	2	13
Paul Gorman	.269	7	29
Peter Hartas	.352	0	18
Bill Cutshall	.324	6	24
John Jaha	.304	7	35
Ron Johnson	.293	8	34

== All-Star Team ==
Position	Name	Team
Catcher	Michael Moyle	Perth Heat
1st Base	Brian Murphy	Sydney Wave
2nd Base	Peter Hartas	Daikyo Dolphins
3rd Base	Shaun Hrabar	Perth Heat
Short Stop	Richard Vagg	Melbourne Bushrangers
Out Field	Damon Buford	Perth Heat
Out Field	Brian Kowitz	Waverley Reds
Out Field	Barrie Bahnert	Adelaide Giants
Designated Hitter	Melvin Wearing	Perth Heat
Starting Pitcher	Adrian Meagher	Daikyo Dolphins
Relief Pitcher	Mark Ettles	Perth Heat
Manager	Steve Gilmour	Brisbane Bandits
