= Carrara Stadium =

Stadium on the Gold Coast, Queensland, Australia

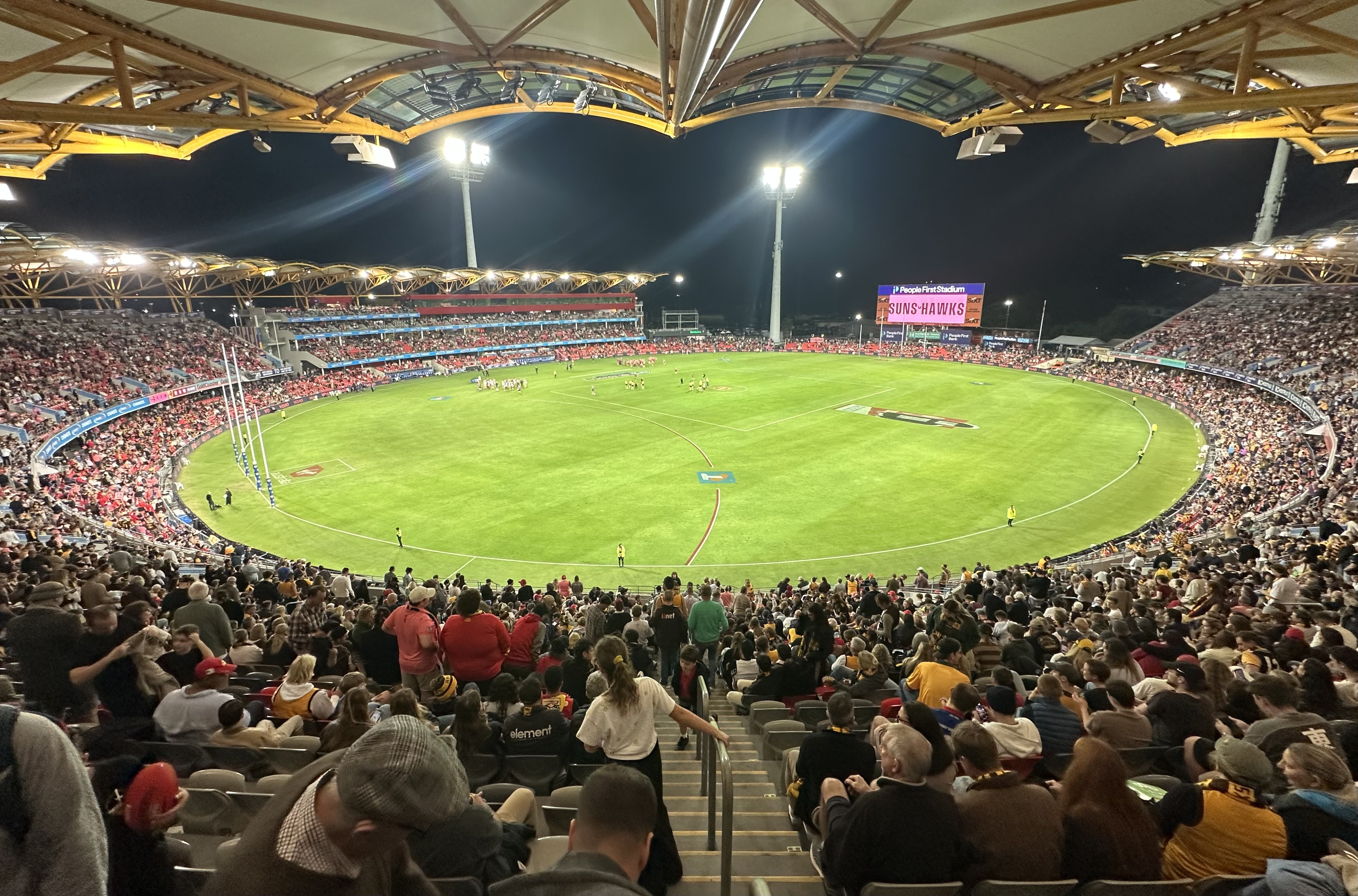
- Stadiums Queensland rating
- Interactive map of Carrara Stadium
- Former names: Laver Oval; Carrara Oval; Gold Coast Stadium; Metricon Stadium; Heritage Bank Stadium
- Location: Carrara, Queensland
- Coordinates: 28°00′23″S 153°22′2″E
- Owner: Queensland Government
- Operator: Stadiums Queensland
- Capacity: Concerts: 50,000; AFL: 25,000; Cricket: 21,000
- Field size: 161 m × 134 m (528 ft × 440 ft)
- Public transit: Carrara Stadium; Nerang

Construction
- Groundbreaking: 1986
- Opened: 1987 (Redeveloped 2010–2011)
- Architect: Populous (2010)

Tenants
- Australian rules football Gold Coast Suns (2011–present); Melbourne Football Club (2006); North Melbourne Football Club (2007–2008); Brisbane Bears (1987–1992); Brisbane Lions (2021); Carlton Football Club (2009); Richmond Football Club (2009); St Kilda Football Club (2009) Cricket Australia cricket team (2018–present); Brisbane Heat (BBL) (2019–) Rugby League Gold Coast Chargers (ARL/NRL) (1996–1998); Gold Coast Titans (NRL) (2007) Rugby Union Nerang Bulls (Rugby Union) (1983–1986); East Coast Aces (ARU) (2007) Baseball Gold Coast Clippers (ABL) (1989–1990); Daikyo Dolphins (ABL) (1992–1993); East Coast Cougars/Gold Coast Cougars (ABL) (1993–1999) Athletics 2018 Commonwealth Games (Athletics)

Website
- peoplefirststadium.com.au

Ground information
- End names
- Nerang River, Nerang-Broadbeach Road End (AFL); Broadbeach End, Hinterland End (Cricket)

International information
- First men's T20I: 17 November 2018: Australia v South Africa
- Last men's T20I: 6 November 2025: Australia v India
- Only women's Test: 30 September–3 October 2021: Australia v India
- First women's T20I: 7 October 2021: Australia v India
- Last women's T20I: 10 October 2021: Australia v India
- As of 5 October 2022; Source: Cricinfo

Carrara Stadium (known under naming rights as People First Stadium) is a stadium located in the Gold Coast suburb of Carrara. It is primarily used for Australian rules football as the home ground of the Gold Coast Suns, in the Australian Football League (AFL) and AFL Women's (AFLW).

The stadium's origins lie in the entry of the Brisbane Bears to the VFL/AFL in 1987, but following the Bears' relocation to the Gabba in 1993, it was used for other sports including rugby league, rugby union and baseball. It received a full-scale redevelopment ahead of Gold Coast's entry into the AFL in 2011. As of 2026, it hosts a capacity of 25,000 spectators, being reduced to 21,000 during cricket matches. Since 2024, Australian-based mutual bank People First Bank have held naming rights to the stadium.

In 2018, Carrara Stadium hosted the opening and closing ceremonies of the Commonwealth Games, as well as the athletics competitions. The venue is used occasionally for cricket, including Big Bash League matches, and would host cricket for the 2032 Summer Olympics if the sport is approved by the International Olympic Committee. It has also hosted many special events and concerts.

== History ==
=== Early history ===
In 1983, the Nerang Bulls Rugby Union Club was formed and were located at Carrara Oval. During 1983, the Bulls fielded one senior team and in 1984 they fielded two senior teams. The club spent two seasons at Carrara before moving to Glennon Park in Nerang in 1985.

On 7 October 1986, it was announced that Australian rules football club the Brisbane Bears had been granted a licence to enter the Victorian Football League for the 1987 VFL season. Bears President, Paul Cronin, announced on 23 December 1986 that the club would use Carrara Oval as their home ground. The financial backer of the Bears, Christopher Skase, spent $1 million redeveloping Carrara Oval over a 10-week period at the beginning of 1987, which included upgraded player facilities, seating for 6,000 spectators and a new electronic scoreboard. On 19 April 1987, the Fitzroy Lions defeated the Brisbane Bears in the first VFL game played at Carrara Oval, before a crowd of 17,795. (The Brisbane Lions website records the crowd unofficially as 22,684.)

In 1989, the Brisbane Bears and the Albert Shire Council signed off on a 30-year lease for the ground with an option for a further 10 years. Following that announcement, Christopher Skase orchestrated the installation of floodlights costing $6 million, which were never paid for. With the collapse of Skase's company Qintex, he would flee to Spain and the cost of the floodlights continued to be unpaid. Liquidators attempted to extract money from the Gold Coast City Council for the lights but, after an unsuccessful trial, it was found cheaper to leave the floodlights in place at Carrara Stadium. On 15 July 1989, the Bears hosted the first ever night match at Carrara, against the Geelong Cats, in front of a then-record crowd of 18,198.

Insufficient public transport access to the stadium and the poor on-field performance of the Bears resulted in poor crowds at Bears games, prompting local media to refer to the situation as the "Curse of Carrara". After the new owner of the Bears, Reuben Pelerman, lost a further $10 million between the 1990–1992 AFL seasons, the Bears moved permanently to the redeveloped Brisbane Cricket Ground in 1993.

In 1988, Carrara Stadium played host to the very first Touch Football World Cup in which teams from Australia, Canada, New Zealand, Papua New Guinea and the USA competed in the Men's, Women's and Mixed Opens, as well as Men's Over 35's divisions. Australia won all four division finals which were all played against New Zealand. The Gold Coast Clippers played their 1989–1990 Australian Baseball League season at Carrara before changing their name to the Daikyo Dolphins and moving to nearby Palm Meadows. For the 1992–93 season, they moved back to Carrara as the Gold Coast Cougars. The Cougars stayed at Carrara until the abolition of the Australian Baseball League in 1999. The Brazilian football team set up camp at Carrara Stadium for pre-tournament training before the 2000 Summer Olympics. The Brazilians later commented that the surface at Carrara was one of the best in the world.

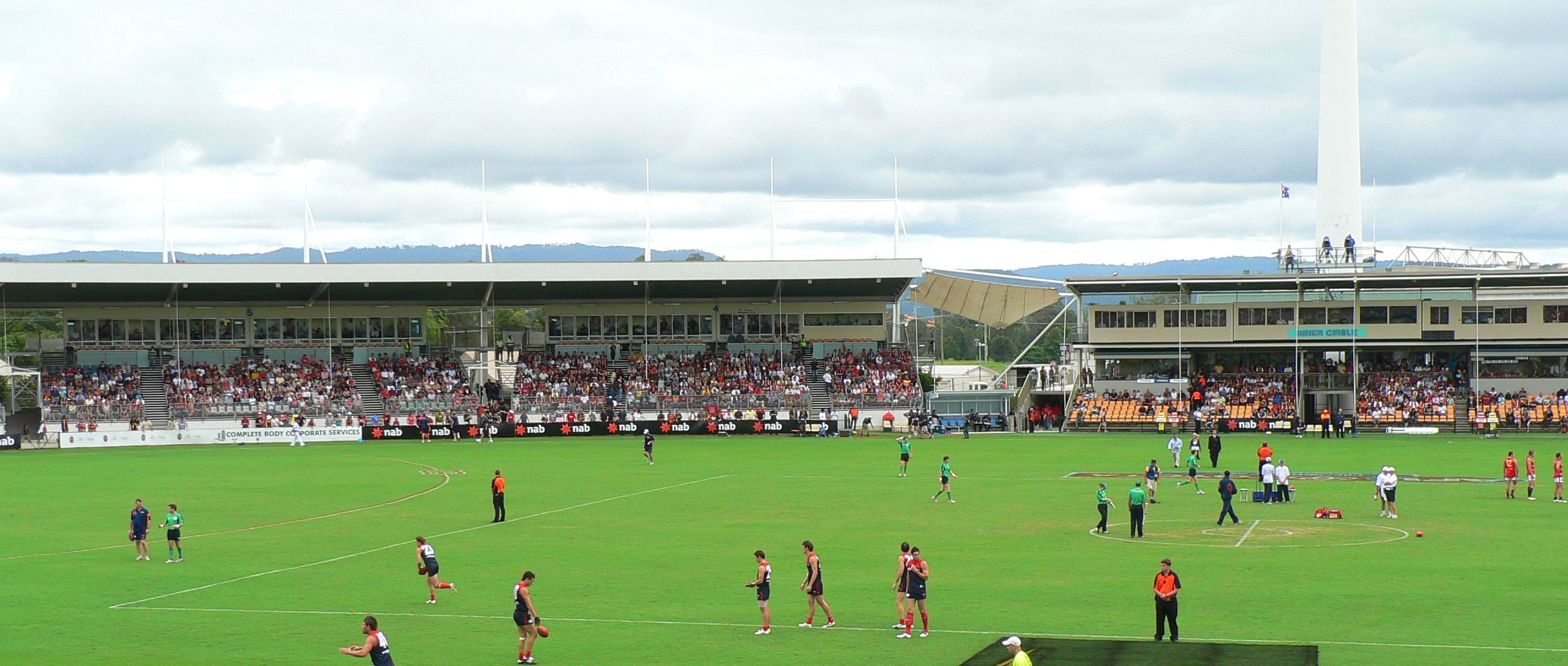
The stadium prior to redevelopment

The ground was owned by the Shire of Albert, which transferred to the Gold Coast City Council when the two local authorities amalgamated in 1995. The field is officially known as Laver Oval after long-time Albert Shire Chairman, Bill Laver.

=== Growth ===
Following the folding of the Gold Coast Seagulls in 1995 a newly formed Gold Coast rugby league team named the Gold Coast Chargers were created and began competing out of Carrara Stadium in 1996. They continued to use the ground until the end of the 1998 NRL season when they were excluded from the competition as a part of the rationalisation of the National Rugby League. Rugby league matches continued to be played at the stadium, with pre-season trials being played there annually from 2002 to 2005, and NRL premiership matches played in 2001 and 2005. The ground's capacity was increased slightly during this time.

In 2005 the NRL announced that a licence would be awarded to the Gold Coast Titans, and that the stadium would be their home ground in 2007 until the completion of the Robina Stadium, which was opened in 2008. In response to the NRL move, the AFL scheduled three AFL 'home games' for the North Melbourne Football Club and a NAB Cup match for Carrara in 2007, and the Queensland State League began hosting grand finals there. The Titans would play ten games at Carrara in 2007 and miss the finals. Following the conclusion of the 2007 NRL season, Titans managing director Michael Searle warned the AFL that if a team were to be started on the Gold Coast it would disappear into the Carrara 'black hole' within five years.

In 2006 it was announced the North Melbourne Football Club would play nine home games at Carrara between the 2007–2009 seasons. Following the 2007 AFL season the AFL offered the Kangaroos a $100 million package to relocate from Melbourne to the Gold Coast and be based out of Carrara. On 7 December 2007 the newly appointed Kangaroos chairman James Brayshaw announced the club would not be moving to the Gold Coast permanently and would continue to be based out of Melbourne. Subsequently, the Kangaroos games played at Carrara after the announcement suffered poor crowds. The AFL released North Melbourne from the final year of a three-year contract after they drew just 6,354 spectators to their first home match at Carrara for the 2008 season.

Carlton, Richmond and St Kilda subsequently hosted the remaining home games during the 2009 season.

=== Redevelopment ===
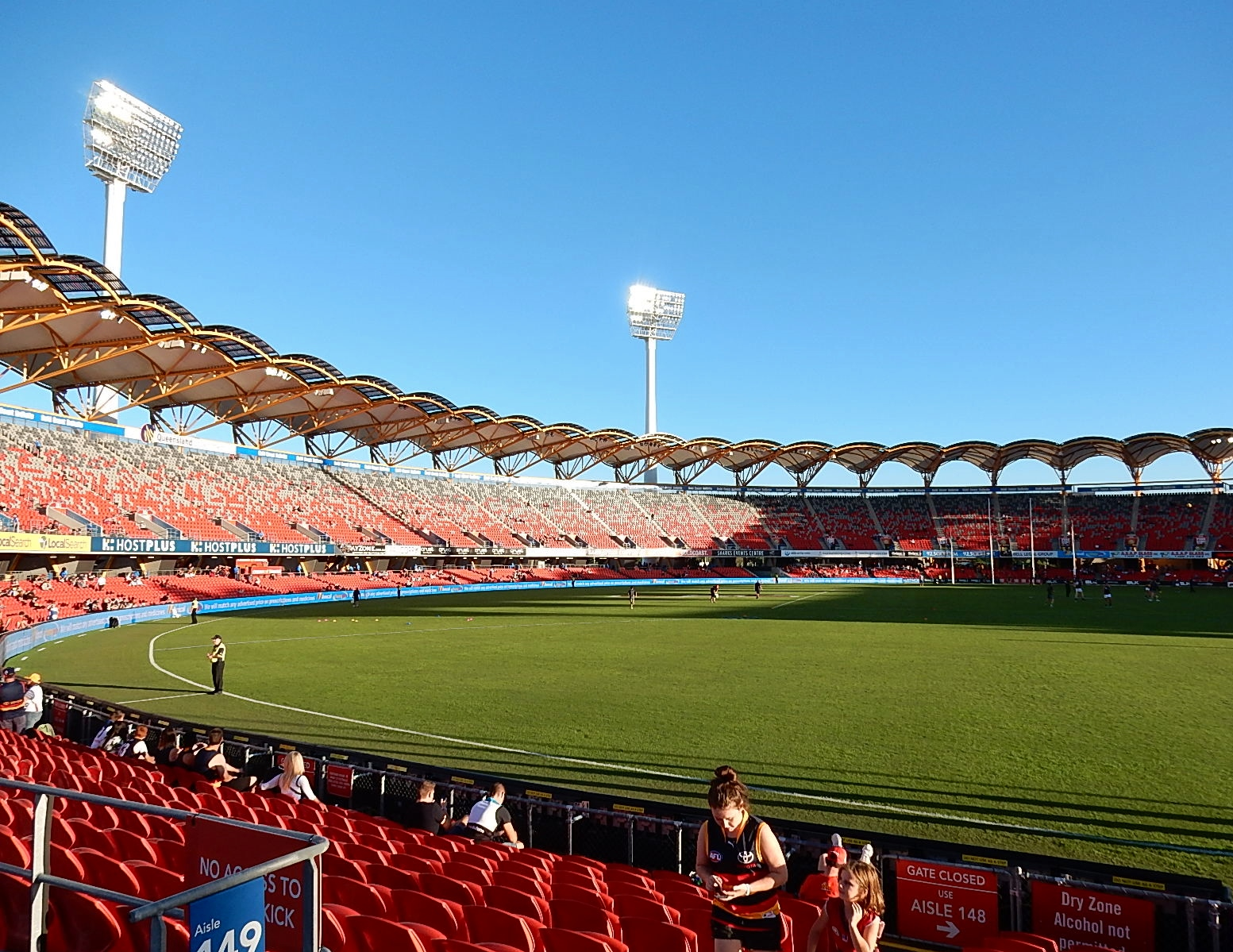
View of the field and grandstand

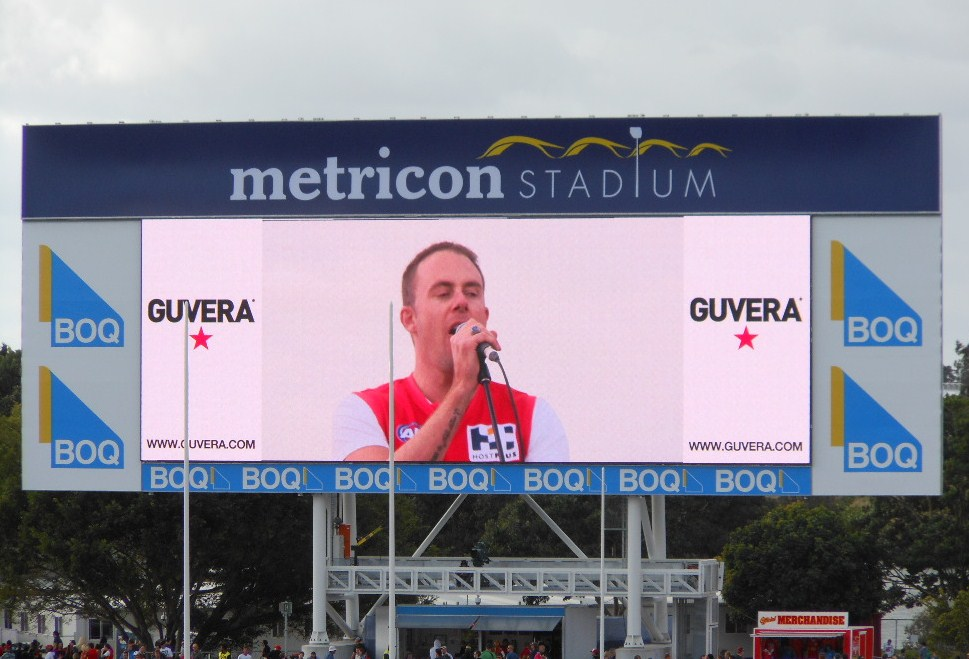
The videoboard.

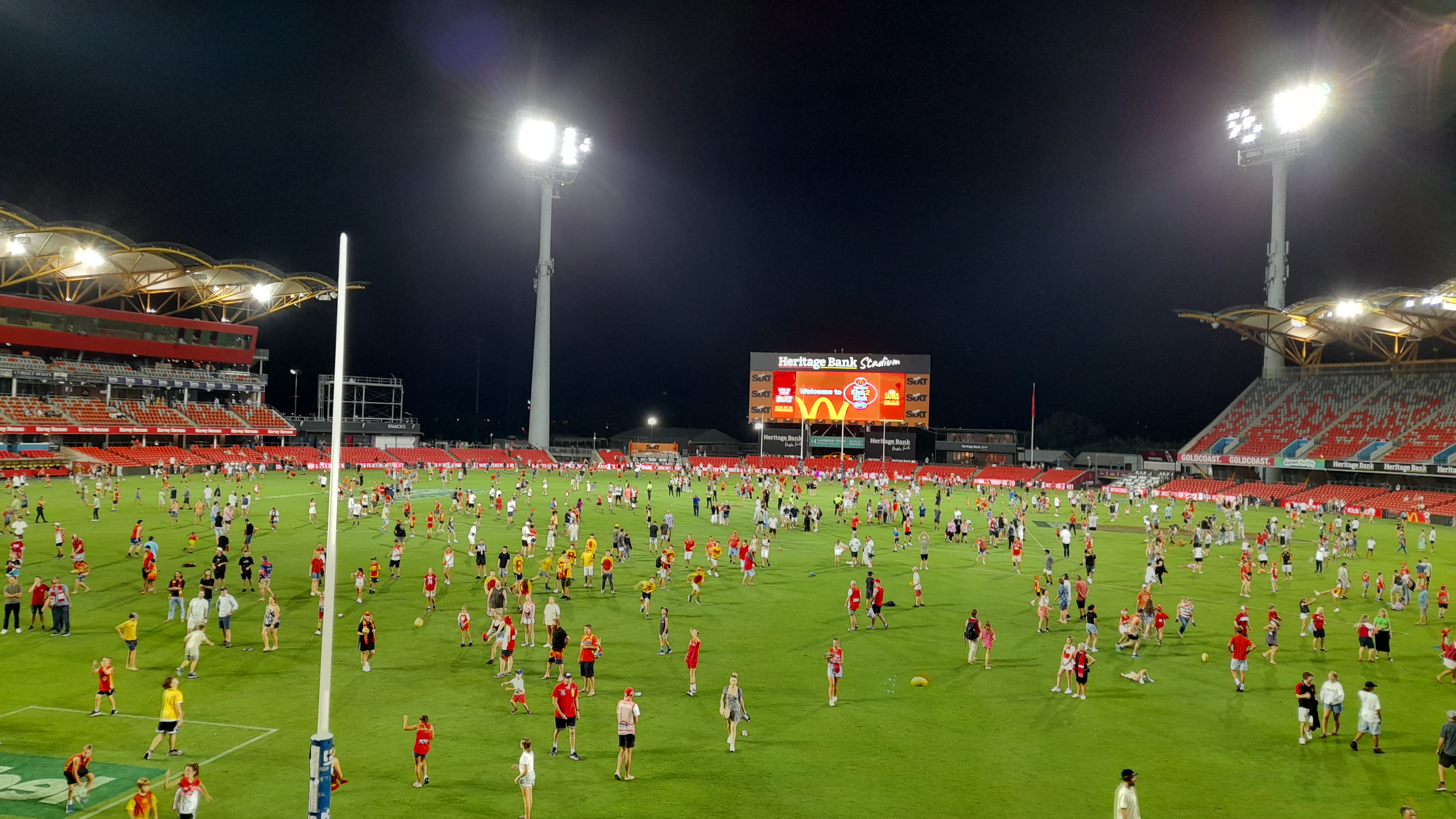
Fans allowed on the field following the completion of the Gold Coast vs Sydney match in 2023

On 7 May 2009, it was confirmed that the Carrara Stadium would receive a $126 million redevelopment, providing a suitable stadium for new AFL club the Gold Coast Suns. The last event at the old ground was Richmond vs Adelaide in front of 11,174 fans. On 30 October 2009, demolition of the old stadium began. By January 2010, demolition works were complete. Foundations for the grandstands as well as construction for the player and corporate facilities began in May 2010. By October 2010, the eastern grandstand was nearing completion. Just three months later in January 2011 the whole horseshoe-shaped grandstand was completed. By April 2011, the turf had been laid and the 23-by-8.5-metre (75 ft × 28 ft), LED-powered high-definition video board had been installed.

The redeveloped stadium cost $144.2 million to build and seats 25,000 spectators (with the ability to house an additional 15,000 temporary seats). The stadium features an AFL oval capable of accommodating an ICC-compliant cricket oval, an IAAF Athletics field and a FIFA World Cup football field, facilities for 2,000 corporate patrons, AFL team and officials' changing facilities, AFL media facilities, and team and officials' suites. Watpac were contracted for the construction, which was scheduled for completion in mid-2011. The stadium then played host to an International rules football in November 2011, with 12,595 watching Ireland defeat Australia by 50 points to 29. MakMax Australia was contracted to complete the fabric roof of the stadium. The stadium was opened for an open day on 22 May 2011, before the first match on 28 May 2011. The ground recorded its biggest ever crowd when 24,032 people watched the Suns play Collingwood in Round 16 of the 2014 AFL season, a game the Suns won by 5 points.

The venue hosted the inaugural Grand Final of AFL Women's on 25 March 2017. The Adelaide Crows defeated the Brisbane Lions 35 points to 29. The Lions won the right to host the match, but Carrara Stadium was used because the Lions' preferred venue, the Brisbane Cricket Ground, was unavailable. A men's QClash took place at Carrara Stadium on the same evening.

The Gold Coast's successful bid for the 2018 Commonwealth Games resulted in the stadium being upgraded to a temporary seating capacity of 35,000, which was dismantled after the Games and restored back to 25,000. The stadium hosted the opening and closing ceremonies as well as the athletics.

The stadium was used extensively during the 2020 AFL season, which was interrupted by the COVID-19 pandemic, as several non-Queensland teams spent extended periods of time in Gold Coast quarantine hubs and played home games at the ground, as a means of carrying on the season while state borders were restricted or closed to interstate travel. The stadium hosted several double-headers, and at the peak of hubbing in round 6, 2020 hosted four senior matches in two days. In all, the ground staged 42 matches in 2020, the most of any ground, and including its first ever finals match.

== Stadium uses ==
Carrara is the home ground for Australian rules football club the Gold Coast Suns, who compete in the Australian Football League (AFL), and also hosts events such as junior representative championships and QAFL games.

=== Gold Coast Suns ===
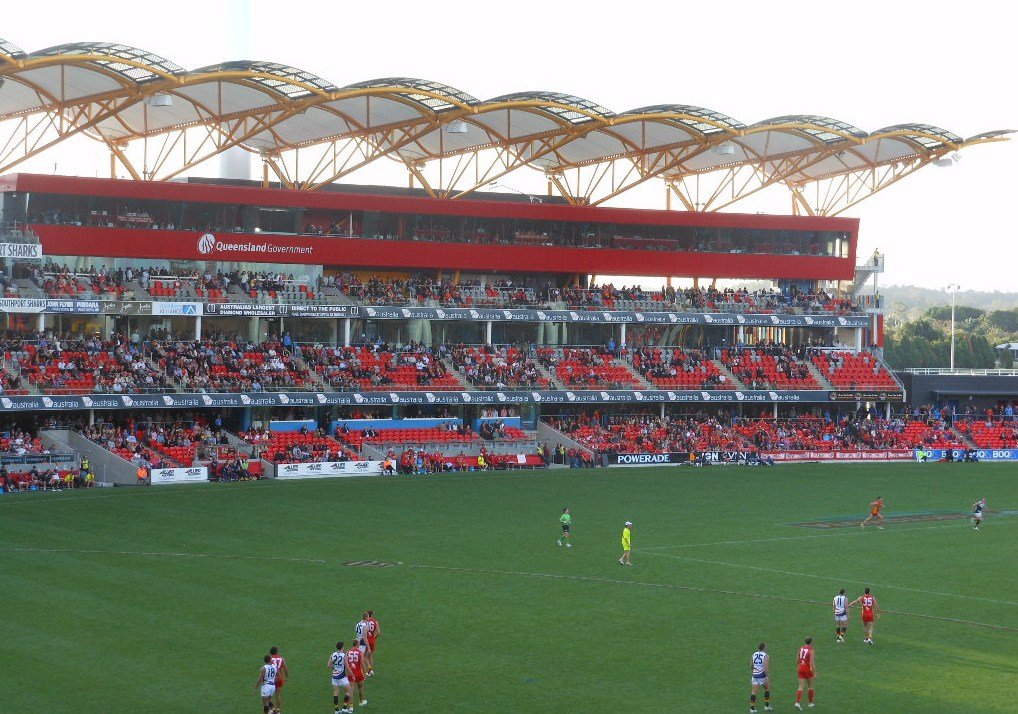
Media facilities at Carrara Stadium.

The Gold Coast Suns have played their home games at Carrara since mid-2011. The Queensland Government contributed $60 million towards the redevelopment of the stadium, increasing the capacity to around 25,000 of which 23,500 is seated. The Gold Coast City Council also contributed $20 million and the AFL $10 million.

The Gold Coast Suns played their first game at the reconstructed stadium on Saturday, 28 May 2011, in Round 10 of the 2011 AFL season. The Suns lost the match against Geelong by 66 points. A round 18 game against 2010 premiers Collingwood attracted a then-record crowd of 23,302, selling out two months before game day. On Saturday 11 August 2012, the Suns won their first game at the venue, defeating Greater Western Sydney by 30 points.

Crowds would not reach in excess of 20,000 again until Round 12, 2014, when 21,354 fans watched the Suns take on the Sydney Swans in a game that marked the first time Gary Ablett Jr. and Lance Franklin went head-to-head since defecting from their original clubs, as well as this being Franklin's first match on the Gold Coast as an AFL player. The record crowd was broken in 2014 when 24,032 attended the Suns' Round 16 game against Collingwood, which the Suns won by five points despite losing their captain Gary Ablett to a season-ending shoulder injury.

=== Cricket ===
The Gold Coast District Cricket Club was formed in 1990 and shared tenancy of Carrara Stadium with the Brisbane Bears. They would continue to be based at Carrara until 1993 when they moved to Robina. The stadium hosted an international cricket match between Queensland and England in January 1991. Controversy fell over the ground when touring English players David Gower and John Morris chose to go for a joy-ride in two Tiger moth biplanes without telling the England team management and buzzed the stadium in the middle of play. Gower and Morris also posed for press photographs with the plane later that afternoon. Both players were subsequently fined £1000 for the prank, a penalty that could have been steeper had Gower elected to release the water bombs he had prepared. Carrara also played host to a 50-over match between Queensland and the West Indies on 1 January 1992, which the visitors won by 7 wickets.

Carrara hosted its first international cricket match since redevelopment on 17 November 2018 with Australia taking on South Africa in a Twenty20 match in front of 12,866 spectators. Carrara hosted three games during the 2018–19 Big Bash League season, two of those games hosted by the Brisbane Heat and the other game hosted by the Melbourne Stars. The stadium remains a potential future home ground for a Gold Coast-based Big Bash League side that enters the competition.

Carrara Stadium was selected to host all Brisbane Heat home finals in the 2023-2024 Big Bash League season. The first final (The Qualifier) is set to be hosted at Carrara with another to be played on the 22nd (The Challenger). This is due to the Australia vs West Indies test match being hosted at The Gabba. The Qualifier final against the Sydney Sixers attracted a Gold Coast cricket record crowd of 20,191 spectators.

=== Musical acts ===
Carrara hosted a triple header of entertainment events on the Easter long weekend in 2001. The first night saw Kiss perform and become the first international act to play at the Stadium. Former Kiss lead guitarist and foundation band member Ace Frehley revealed in his 2011 autobiography that he punched then-tour manager Tommy Thayer in the jaw while in the dressing room at the conclusion of the Gold Coast concert in 2001. The stadium served as the venue for the last leg of the Kiss Farewell Tour and Thayer would later replace Frehley as the lead guitarist in the band. The next night saw rock legend Alice Cooper perform at the stadium. The third and final night of the long weekend saw the Anthony Mundine-Timo Masua boxing match take place at Carrara.

On 10 December 2011 the Foo Fighters performed at Carrara and set the all-time attendance record for any event ever held at Carrara Stadium, 37,000 people attended the concert. The stadium is also featured in the Foo Fighters film clip of "These Days". Filming took place during the concert on 10 December 2011. On 19 January 2014, the venue hosted the Gold Coast leg of the Big Day Out. The stadium was set to serve as the host of the two-day SandTunes Music Festival on 30 November & 1 December 2019, prior to its cancellation. The line-up included acts such as Travis Scott, Dean Lewis and Carly Rae Jepsen.

Queen + Adam Lambert played at the stadium on 29 February 2020 in the final concert of their Australian leg of The Rhapsody Tour and pulled a record crowd of 40,000 attendees. In November 2020, it was announced Guns N' Roses would play at the stadium on 6 November 2021. The show was later postponed to 24 November 2022.

=== Commonwealth Games ===
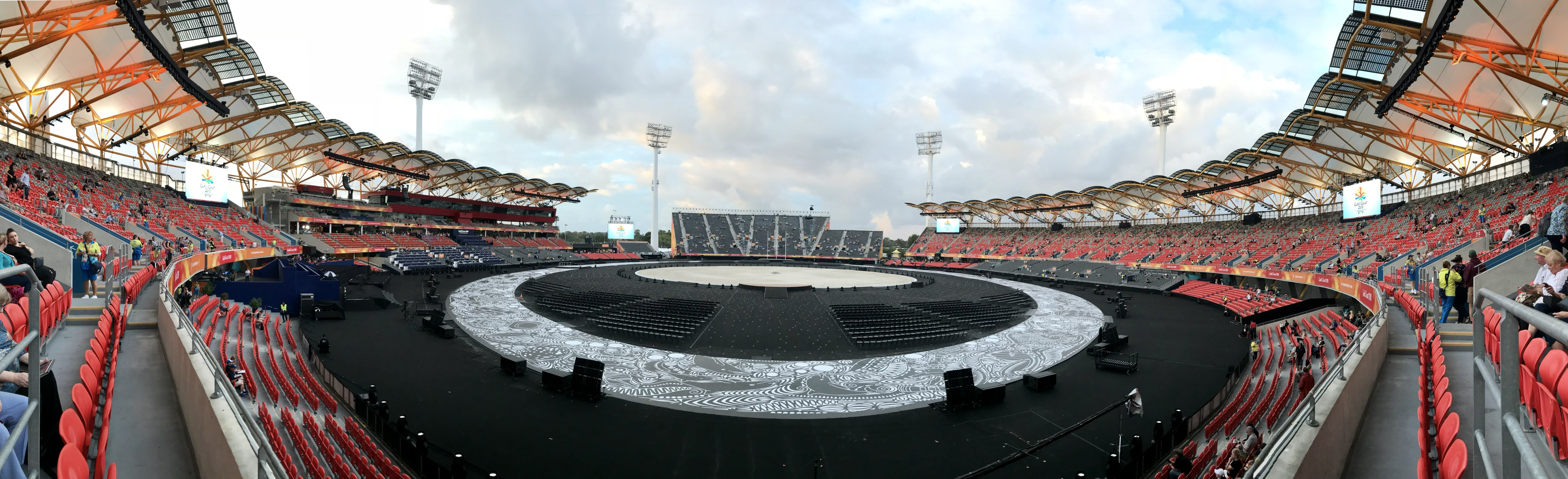
Carrara Stadium prior to the opening ceremony of the 2018 Commonwealth Games.

Carrara Stadium hosted the opening and closing ceremonies of the 2018 Commonwealth Games as well as hosting the athletics events. The athlete's village was originally going to be located next to Carrara Stadium but instead was constructed in Southport. The stadium was temporarily upgraded to hold 35,000 people prior to the start of the opening ceremony.

== Naming rights ==
The stadium lacked a naming rights sponsor in its formative decades, bearing the names Carrara Stadium and Gold Coast Stadium between its opening in 1987 and 2011. On 15 March 2011, the Gold Coast Football Club announced that nationally active home builder group Metricon Homes had signed a $3 million, 5-year deal for naming rights of Carrara Stadium, to be known henceforth as Metricon Stadium. In March 2016 Metricon Homes signed a 5-year extension deal with the Suns until 25 March 2020 for the naming rights of the stadium. The agreement was later extended to the end of 2022. In 2023 the stadium was renamed Heritage Bank Stadium, after a contract was signed with mutual bank Heritage Bank. In the same year, Heritage Bank merged with People's Choice Credit Union based in Adelaide, South Australia to create People First Bank. Therefore, the stadium was renamed People First Stadium in March 2024.

== Transport access ==
Kinetic offers shuttle bus services for events at the stadium. These services run to the stadium bus station, located outside the main gates. A taxi rank is also located near the bus station.

Shuttle bus services
Destination	Bus stand	Connections
Nerang railway station	1-6	Gold Coast line Kinetic Gold Coast
Broadbeach South light rail station	7-10	Kinetic Gold Coast
Boowaggan road	11-13	Parking

When event shuttle buses are not running, the stadium is accessible through the local bus route 745, and by rail at Nerang railway station, located a short walk from the stadium.

=== Future expansions ===
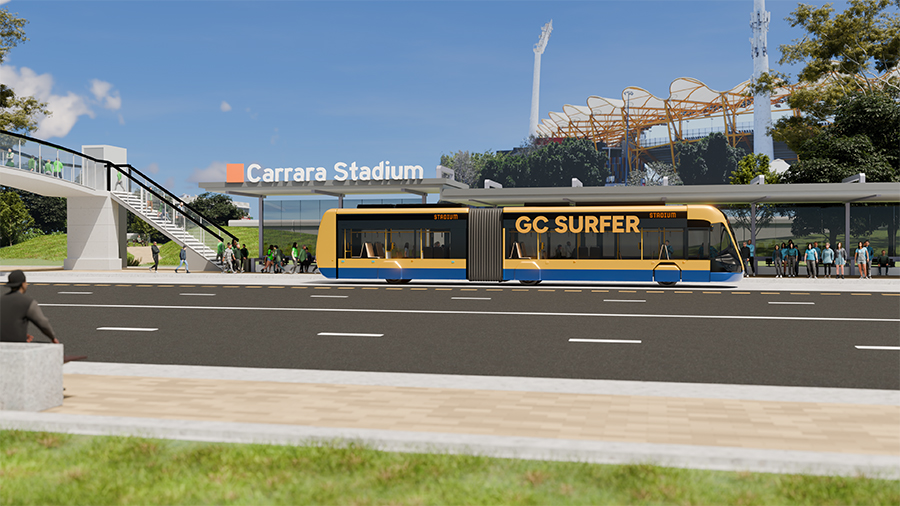
The GC Surfer at an expanded bus station

Plans for a ferry service at the stadium were first proposed in 2013, however no service has started. An expansion of the G:link to the stadium has also been proposed.

In 2026, it was announced that the GC Surfer bus rapid transit project would include an expanded station with a pedestrian overpass at the stadium.

== AFL records ==
=== Individual ===
Most goals in a game by a player
Goals	Player	Club	Opponent	Date
13	(Victoria (state)) Peter Daicos	Collingwood	Brisbane Bears	3 Aug 1991
11	(Victoria (state)) Gary Ablett Sr.	Geelong	Brisbane Bears	5 Jun 1988
11	(Queensland) Jason Dunstall	Hawthorn	Brisbane Bears	14 Jun 1987
10	(Western Australia) Simon Beasley	Footscray	Brisbane Bears	23 Aug 1987
10	(Tasmania) Jack Riewoldt	Richmond	Gold Coast	11 Aug 2018

Most career goals by a player
Goals	Player	Club	Games
139	(Victoria (state)) Tom Lynch	Gold Coast; Richmond	71
98	(Western Australia) Brad Hardie	Brisbane Bears	45
84	(Victoria (state)) Roger Merrett	Brisbane Bears	44
72	(Victoria (state)) Gary Ablett Jr.	Gold Coast; Geelong	58
71	(Queensland) Alex Sexton	Gold Coast	68

Most disposals in a game by a player
Disposals	Player	Club	Opponent	Date
51	(South Australia) Scott Thompson	Adelaide	Gold Coast	20 Aug 2011
49	(Victoria (state)) Gary Ablett Jr.	Gold Coast	Collingwood	20 Jul 2013
45	(Victoria (state)) Gary Ablett Jr.	Gold Coast	Essendon	14 Apr 2012
43	(Victoria (state)) Gary Ablett Jr.	Gold Coast	Hawthorn	3 Sep 2011
43	(South Australia) Bryce Gibbs	Carlton	Gold Coast	17 Jun 2017
43	(Victoria (state)) Ollie Wines	Port Adelaide	Gold Coast	19 Jun 2021

Most career games by a player
Games	Player	Club	Years
88	(Queensland) Jarrod Harbrow	Gold Coast	2011–2021
85	(Western Australia) David Swallow	Gold Coast	2011–
71	(Victoria (state)) Tom Lynch	Gold Coast; Richmond	2011–
69	(Victoria (state)) Touk Miller	Gold Coast	2015–
68	(Queensland) Alex Sexton	Gold Coast	2012–

^{Last updated: 1 November 2022}

== Cricket records ==
=== Twenty20 ===
==== Individual batting ====
Highest individual score in a match
Runs	Player	Team	Opponent	Competition	Date
96	(New South Wales) Daniel Hughes	Sydney	Melbourne	Big Bash League	26 Dec 2020
87	(Western Australia) Shaun Marsh	Melbourne	Sydney	Big Bash League	1 Jan 2021
84	(Queensland) Chris Lynn	Brisbane	Sydney	Big Bash League	1 Jan 2019
83	(Victoria (state)) Glenn Maxwell	Melbourne	Brisbane	Big Bash League	20 Dec 2019
71	(Victoria (state)) Glenn Maxwell	Melbourne	Sydney	Big Bash League	26 Dec 2020

Most career runs
Runs	Matches	Player	Team/s	Period
276	6	(Victoria (state)) Glenn Maxwell	Melbourne, Australia	2018–
251	7	(Queensland) Chris Lynn	Brisbane, Australia	2018–
163	5	(New South Wales) Daniel Hughes	Sydney	2019–
154	2	(Western Australia) Shaun Marsh	Melbourne	2020–
134	2	(Tasmania) Jonathan Wells	Adelaide	2019–

==== Individual bowling ====
Best figures in a match
Bowling	Player	Team	Opponent	Competition	Date
4/18	(Barbados) Carlos Brathwaite	Sydney	Brisbane	Big Bash League	10 Jan 2021
3/16	(Victoria (state)) Fawad Ahmed	Perth	Brisbane	Big Bash League	1 Jan 2020
3/18	(Afghanistan) Rashid Khan	Adelaide	Sydney	Big Bash League	3 Jan 2021
3/24	(Victoria (state)) Peter Siddle	Adelaide	Melbourne	Big Bash League	27 Dec 2019
3/25	(England) Tom Curran	Sydney	Brisbane	Big Bash League	1 Jan 2019

Most career wickets
Wickets	Matches	Player	Team/s	Period
9	5	(New South Wales) Adam Zampa	Melbourne	2019–
6	4	(Barbados) Carlos Brathwaite	Sydney	2020–
6	4	(Queensland) Mark Steketee	Brisbane	2018–
5	4	(New South Wales) Josh Lalor	Brisbane	2018–
5	4	(Afghanistan) Mujeeb Ur Rahman	Brisbane	2018–

^{Last updated: 11 January 2021}

== Attendance records ==
=== Sports ===
NOTE: This table does not include stadium attendances at the 2018 Commonwealth Games.

No.	Date	Teams	Sport	Competition	Crowd
1	5 July 2014	Gold Coast Suns vs. Collingwood Magpies	Australian rules football	AFL	24,032
2	23 July 2011	Gold Coast Suns vs. Collingwood Magpies	Australian rules football	AFL	23,302
3	29 June 2024	Gold Coast Suns vs. Collingwood Magpies	Australian rules football	AFL	23,029
4	11 July 2025	Gold Coast Suns vs. Collingwood Magpies	Australian rules football	AFL	22,831
5	18 March 1994	Gold Coast Seagulls vs. Brisbane Broncos	Rugby league	NSWRL	22,688
6	1 July 2023	Gold Coast Suns vs. Collingwood Magpies	Australian rules football	AFL	22,483
7	9 March 2024	Gold Coast Suns vs. Richmond Tigers	Australian rules football	AFL	22,086
8	2 June 2024	Gold Coast Suns vs. Essendon Bombers	Australian rules football	AFL	21,759
9	28 May 2011	Gold Coast Suns vs. Geelong Cats	Australian rules football	AFL	21,485
10	8 June 2014	Gold Coast Suns vs. Sydney Swans	Australian rules football	AFL	21,354

^{Last updated: 12 July 2025}

=== Other events ===
No.	Date	Name of tour/event	Act/s	Crowd
1	28 February 2023	Love On Tour	Harry Styles	48,177
2	13 November 2024	Dark Matter World Tour	Pearl Jam	46,900
3	20 February 2024	Summer Carnival Tour	Alecia Beth Moore (Pink)	46,000
4	14 December 2025	Spilt Milk 2025	Kendrick Lamar, Doechii	40,000
5	29 February 2020	The Rhapsody Tour	Queen + Adam Lambert	39,607
6	10 December 2011	Wasting Light Tour	Foo Fighters	37,000
7	4 April 2018	2018 Commonwealth Games	Delta Goodrem, Ricki-Lee Coulter	35,000
7	19 January 2014	Big Day Out 2014	Pearl Jam, Arcade Fire	35,000
7	26 November 2023	Spilt Milk 2023	Post Malone, Dom Dolla	35,000
10	24 November 2022	We're F'n Back Tour	Guns N' Roses	30,000
10	4 November 2023	Got Back Tour	Paul McCartney	30,000

^{Last updated: 26 December 2025}

== Awards ==
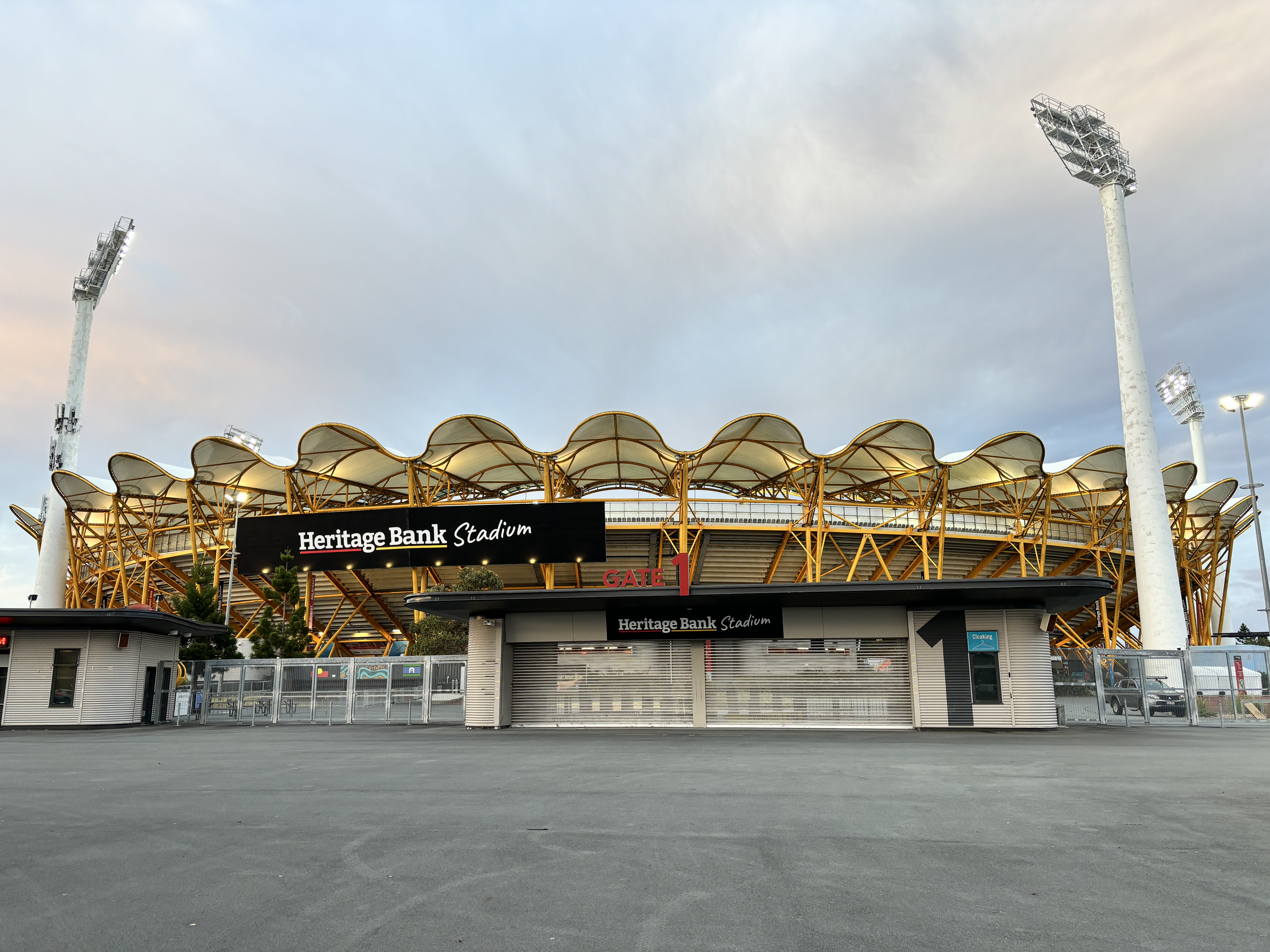
The exterior of the stadium as seen in October 2023.

=== Won ===
- 2011 AFL Fans Favourite Venue
- 2012 ASI Steel Design Awards for Queensland – Best Large Project Building
- 2012 ASI Steel Design Awards for Queensland – Best Engineering Project Building
- 2012 ASI Steel Design Awards for Queensland – Best Use of Sustainability
- 2012 ASI Steel Design Awards for Queensland – Best Sporting and Community Facility over $20 million

=== Nominated ===
- 2012 ASI Steel Design Awards for Queensland – Project of the Year
- 2012 Stadium Business Awards – Project of the Year

== See also ==
- List of Australian Football League grounds
- List of Australian rugby league stadiums
- List of cricket grounds in Australia
- List of sports venues in Australia
- Sports on the Gold Coast, Queensland

== Sources ==
- AFL Attendance Records
- NRL Attendance Records
- Gold Coast City Council – Carrara Stadium
- BPN news article
