= Daikyo Dolphins =

- Logo

Information
- League: Australian Baseball League (1989–1999)
- Location: Gold Coast
- Ballpark: Carrara Stadium
- Founded: 1989–90 (as Gold Coast Clippers)
- Folded: Changed name to East Coast Cougars after 1992–93 season
- Nickname: Dolphins
- League championships: 1991–92
- 1992–93: 19–26 (6th)
- Former name: Gold Coast Clippers (1989–90)
- Former ballpark: Palm Meadows (1990–92)

The Daikyo Dolphins were formerly the Gold Coast Clippers, a foundation team in the now defunct Australian Baseball League. The Clippers changed their name to the Daikyo Dolphins following the signing of a major sponsorship deal with Japanese real estate development company Daikyo to create one of the strongest teams in ABL history. Daikyo ended its sponsorship of the club due to financial troubles in Australia, and after a season of being known as the Gold Coast Dolphins in 1992/93, the club changed its name again to the East Coast Cougars (later Gold Coast Cougars) as of the 1993/94 season.

== History ==
Season	Finish
1990–91	2nd
1991–92	1st
1992–93	6th

== See also ==
- Sport in Australia
- Australian Baseball
- Australian Baseball League (1989–1999)
