= Parry Field =

Former sports venue in Belmont, Western Australia

Coordinates: 31°56′31″S 115°55′17″E

- Interactive map of Parry Field
- Former names: Belmont International Baseball Stadium
- Location: Belmont, Perth, Western Australia
- Owner: Belmont City Council
- Operator: Baseball WA
- Capacity: 5,000 (2,200 seated)
- Surface: Grass

Construction
- Opened: 1983
- Closed: 1997
- Demolished: 1997

Tenants
- Perth Heat (ABL) (1989–1994); Baseball WA

Parry Field is a former sports venue in Belmont, a suburb of Perth, Western Australia. It is best known for being the home of baseball team Perth Heat between 1989 and 1997. The venue was built in 1983 on the site of Belmont Oval which had been primarily used for soccer and rugby league. After the demolition of the baseball stadium, the land became known as Grove Farm Reserve.

== History ==
The land was part of Grove Farm, which was founded in the early 1830s. In the mid-1950s, the land was transferred to the Belmont Park Road Board and placed in a trust with the stated land use of recreation. In 1955, Belmont Oval was officially opened at a rugby league match between Western Australia and France.

In 1983, it became the first purpose-built baseball stadium in Australia. It was named for Kevin Parry, a local businessman and enthusiast whose fortunes failed soon after the opening. The stadium featured television-standard lighting, seating for about 2,200 people and standing room for 3,000 more. It was demolished by the City of Belmont as part of the WA Building Better Cities Program. Councillors were influenced by complaints from local residents about fireworks, loud music and other pre-match festivities. However, baseball being far from a mainstream sport in Australia, its managers had also been unable to recoup the stadium's high maintenance costs on a year-round basis.

After the demolition of the baseball facilities the city council intended to develop the land, however the conditions of the trust led to a long delay, during which the land has been unused.
