= 1989–90 Australian Baseball League season =

The inaugural Australian Baseball League championship was won by the Waverley Reds coached by Phil Dale who defeated cross-town rivals the Melbourne Monarchs 3–1 in the 4 game championship series.

== All-Star game ==
=== Teams ===
Team 1
| Position | Name | Team |
|---|---|---|
| C | David Clarkson | Waverley Reds |
| 1B | Pete Beeler | Waverley Reds |
| 2B | David Buckthorpe | Waverley Reds |
| 3B | Jeff Kipila | Parramatta Patriots |
| SS | M. Sheldon-Collins | Waverley Reds |
| OF | Ron Carothers | Waverley Reds |
| OF | Paul Coogan | Brisbane Bandits |
| OF | Jason Marks | Parramatta Patriots |
| DH | Tony Adamson | Perth Heat |
| SP | Phil Dale | Waverley Reds |
| RP | Bob Nilsson | Gold Coast Clippers |
| M | Phil Dale | Waverley Reds |

Team 2
| Position | Name | Team |
|---|---|---|
| C | Randy Knorr | Melbourne Monarchs |
| 1B | Dave Rusin | Perth Heat |
| 2B | Andrew Scott | Adelaide Giants |
| 3B | Craig Kernick | Waverley Reds |
| SS | Richard Vagg | Melbourne Monarchs |
| OF | Scott Steed | Perth Heat |
| OF | Brett Ward | Melbourne Monarchs |
| OF | Lionel Harris | Parramatta Patriots |
| DH | Brian Murphy | Sydney Metros |
| SP | Carl Grovom | Waverley Reds |
| RP | Mark Respondek | Waverley Reds |

== Ladder ==
| Team | Played | Wins | Loss | Win % | GB | Home |
|---|---|---|---|---|---|---|
| Waverley Reds | 40 | 34 | 6 | .850 | | 17-2 |
| Melbourne Monarchs | 40 | 24 | 16 | .600 | 10 | 13-8 |
| Parramatta Patriots | 40 | 22 | 18 | .550 | 12 | 11-8 |
| Perth Heat | 42 | 23 | 19 | .548 | 12 | 14-7 |
| Adelaide Giants | 38 | 19 | 19 | .500 | 14 | 12-9 |
| Gold Coast Clippers | 37 | 16 | 21 | .432 | 16.5 | 9-10 |
| Brisbane Bandits | 42 | 18 | 24 | .429 | 17 | 11-10 |
| Sydney Metros | 39 | 3 | 36 | .077 | 30.5 | 0-18 |

== Championship series ==
=== Final Series: Game 1: 1st Vs 2nd at Waverley Park ===
| Team | 1 | 2 | 3 | 4 | 5 | 6 | 7 | 8 | 9 | R | H | E |
|---|---|---|---|---|---|---|---|---|---|---|---|---|
| Melbourne Monarchs | ? | ? | ? | ? | ? | ? | ? | ? | ? | 1 | ? | ? |
| Waverley Reds | ? | ? | ? | ? | ? | ? | ? | ? | ? | 3 | ? | ? |
WP: ? (1-0) LP: ? (0-1) Sv: ? Home runs: Monarchs: ? Reds: ?

=== Final Series: Game 2: 1st Vs 2nd at Waverley Park ===
| Team | 1 | 2 | 3 | 4 | 5 | 6 | 7 | 8 | 9 | R | H | E |
|---|---|---|---|---|---|---|---|---|---|---|---|---|
| Melbourne Monarchs | ? | ? | ? | ? | ? | ? | ? | ? | ? | 4 | ? | ? |
| Waverley Reds | ? | ? | ? | ? | ? | ? | ? | ? | ? | 3 | ? | ? |
WP: ? (1-0) LP: ? (0-1) Sv: ? Home runs: Monarchs: ? Reds: ?

=== Final Series: Game 3: 1st Vs 2nd at Melbourne Ballpark ===
| Team | 1 | 2 | 3 | 4 | 5 | 6 | 7 | 8 | 9 | R | H | E |
|---|---|---|---|---|---|---|---|---|---|---|---|---|
| Waverley Reds | ? | ? | ? | ? | ? | ? | ? | ? | ? | 9 | ? | ? |
| Melbourne Monarchs | ? | ? | ? | ? | ? | ? | ? | ? | ? | 3 | ? | ? |
WP: ? (1-0) LP: ? (0-1) Sv: ? Home runs: Reds: ? Monarchs: ?

=== Final Series: Game 4: 1st Vs 2nd at Melbourne Ballpark ===
| Team | 1 | 2 | 3 | 4 | 5 | 6 | 7 | 8 | 9 | R | H | E |
|---|---|---|---|---|---|---|---|---|---|---|---|---|
| Waverley Reds | ? | ? | ? | ? | ? | ? | ? | ? | ? | 3 | ? | ? |
| Melbourne Monarchs | ? | ? | ? | ? | ? | ? | ? | ? | ? | 2 | ? | ? |
WP: ? (1-0) LP: ? (0-1) Sv: ? Home runs: Reds: ? Monarchs: ?

== Awards ==
| Award | Person | Team |
|---|---|---|
| Most Valuable Player | Phil Dale | Waverley Reds |
| Championship M.V.P. | Matthew Sheldon-Collins | Waverley Reds |
| Batting Champion | David Clarkson | Waverley Reds |
| Pitcher of the Year | Phil Dale | Waverley Reds |
| Rookie of the Year | Jason Marks | Parramatta Patriots |
| Manager of the Year | Phil Dale | Waverley Reds |

== Top Stats ==
Defensive Stats
| Name | Wins | Losses | Saves | ERA |
|---|---|---|---|---|
| Phil Dale | 9 | 2 | 0 | 1.44 |
| Carl Grovom | 7 | 0 | 0 | 2.73 |
| David Simpson | 5 | 0 | 0 | 2.78 |
| Simon Sheldon-Collins | 5 | 2 | 0 | 3.17 |
| Mark Respondek | 2 | 0 | 4 | 2.27 |
| Joey Viera | 3 | 1 | 1 | 0.00 |

Offensive Stars
| Name | Avg | HR | RBI |
|---|---|---|---|
| David Clarkson | .444 | 3 | 31 |
| Pete Beeler | .373 | 3 | 26 |
| Ron Carothers | .329 | 6 | 41 |
| Richard Sisson | .328 | 1 | 15 |
| Craig Kernick | .318 | 1 | 20 |
| Matthew Sheldon-Collins | .317 | 4 | 29 |
| David Buckthorpe | .299 | 5 | 30 |

== All-Star Team ==
| Position | Name | Team |
|---|---|---|
| Catcher | David Clarkson | Waverley Reds |
| 1st Base | Pete Beeler | Waverley Reds |
| 2nd Base | David Buckthorpe | Waverley Reds |
| 3rd Base | Jeff Kapila | Parramatta Patriots |
| Short Stop | Matthew Sheldon-Collins | Waverley Reds |
| Out Field | Ron Carothers | Waverley Reds |
| Out Field | Paul Coogan | Brisbane Bandits |
| Out Field | Jason Marks | Parramatta Patriots |
| Designated Hitter | Tony Adamson | Perth Heat |
| Starting Pitcher | Phil Dale | Waverley Reds |
| Relief Pitcher | Bob Nilsson | Gold Coast Clippers |
| Manager | Phil Dale | Waverley Reds |
