= 2000–01 International Baseball League of Australia team rosters =

The 2000–01 IBLA Development League was held on the Gold Coast, Australia between two venues, Palm Meadows and Carrara Oval. The league was competed between four teams: IBLA Australia, IBLA Internationals, MLB Stars and the Taiwan national baseball team.

== IBLA Australia ==
IBLA Australia roster – 2000-01 IBLA
Active roster		Coaching Staff
Pitchers Right-handed pitchers: 35 (Australia) Brett Baker; 31 (Australia) Simon Beresford; 33 (Australia) Anthony Collis; 40 (Australia) Craig Lewis; 29 (Australia) Wayne Lundgren; (Australia) Leigh Neuge; 55 (Australia) Luke Prokopec; 42 (Australia) Ben Rowe; Left-handed pitchers: (Australia) Andrew Cooke; 15 (Australia) Travis Blackley; 36 (Australia) Duane Rochford	Catchers: 19 (Australia) Ben Foster; 39 (Australia) Justin Huber; Infielders: 9 (Australia) Mathew Buckley; 7 (Australia) Trent Durrington; 4 (South Africa) Gavin Fingleson; 10 (Australia) Adam Morrissey; (Australia) Ben Risinger; 17 (Australia) Brett Roneberg; 43 (Australia) Dane Tomaszwski; 18 (Australia) Glenn Williams; Outfielders: 38 (Australia) Jarrod Hodges; 24 (Australia) Chris Snelling; 8 (Australia) Marc Taintey; (Australia) Paul Weichard	Manager: (Australia) Jon Deeble; Coaches: (Australia) Phil Dale; (Australia) Tony Harris; (Australia) Greg Jelks
Current as of January 2001.

== IBLA Internationals ==
IBLA Internationals roster – 2000-01 IBLA
Active roster		Coaching Staff
Pitchers Right-handed pitchers: 16 (Australia) PJ Bevis; 35 Jun-Gan Chang; 21 (United States) Mark Dewey; 1 Matt Gahan; 24 Brad Guy; 2 Kwang-Soo Kim; 27 Min-Ki Kim; 18 Paul Mutch; 22 (England) Phil Stockman; 26 Daniel Thomson; 6 (United States) Brad Voyles; Left-handed pitchers	Catchers: 7 Mitch Evans; 20 (United States) Brandon Harper; Infielders: 4 (United States) Nicholas Green; 3 Ji-Hwan Sohn; 17 Andrew Zapp; Outfielders: 0 Scott Goodman; 12 Paul Gorman; 29 (United States) Ryan Langerhans; 11 Steven Ryderen; 5 Marc Taintey; 10 Adam Wardrop; 14 (New Zealand) Travis Wilson	Manager: - (United States) Chris Bando; Coaches: - (United States) Ron Johnson; - Cheol-Young Park
Current as of January 2001.

== Taiwan national baseball team ==
Taiwan national Baseball team roster – 2000-01 IBLA
Active roster		Coaching Staff
Pitchers Right-handed pitchers: 53 (Taiwan) Chen Jung-Chao; 51 (Taiwan) Chuang Hung-Liang; 45 (Taiwan) Liu Yu-Chan; 17 (Taiwan) Tsai Chung-Nan; 39 (Taiwan) Tseng Chao-Hao; 23 (Taiwan) Wang Kuo-Cheng; 18 (Taiwan) Wang Kuo-Chin; 46 (Taiwan) Yang Chien-Fu; Left-handed pitchers: 47 (Taiwan) Hsieh Fu-Kuei; 13 (Taiwan) Huang Chin Chih	Catchers: 2 (Taiwan) Kao Chih-Kang; 22 (Taiwan) Tang Chieh-Chuan; 27 (Taiwan) Yeh Chun-Chang; Infielders: 49 (Taiwan) Chang Tai-Shan; 31 (Taiwan) Cheng Chang-Ming; 56 (Taiwan) Chi Chun-Lin; 3 (Taiwan) Huang Chung-Yi; 12 (Taiwan) Lin Chih-Sheng; 54 (Taiwan) Wang Shih-Hua; Outfielders: 50 (Taiwan) Chen Chih-Yuan; 5 (Taiwan) Chen Lien-Hung; 10 (Taiwan) Chou Szu-Chi; 29 (Taiwan) Lin Chin-Ping; 1 (Taiwan) Wang, Chien-Ming; 8 (Taiwan) Yang Sun-Hsuan	Manager: (Taiwan) Lin, Hua-Wei; Coaches: (Taiwan) Yeh, Chih-Shien; (Taiwan) Shiau, Wen-Sheng; (Taiwan) Sakai, Mitsujiro; (Taiwan) Chian, Yen-Hao (Trainer)
Current as of January 2001.
