= 2000–01 International Baseball League of Australia season =

The 2000-01 International Baseball League of Australia was the 2nd season of the League. The 2000-01 leagues was to consist of 3 parts; A traditional Claxton Shield Tournament, to be played in late December 2000, an All-Star game and an International Development League to be played exclusively on the Gold Coast at Palm Meadows and Carrara Oval from late November 2000 to late January 2001.

== Claxton Shield ==
The 2000-01 Claxton Shield was to be held at Blacktown Baseball Stadium in the week after Christmas. The Tournament was canceled in early December due to the grounds being unfit for play. The timing of a Tournament was also unpopular with many of the players.

== All-Star Challenge ==
The All-Star Challenge was scheduled for the Australia Day weekend 26–28 January 2001, it was to be held at Colonial Stadium, Melbourne. The weekend was to be contested by the Australia national baseball team and an All-Star team that was rumored to include MLB player Roberto Alomar. The game was canceled at the same time at the 2000-01 Claxton Shield.

== Development League ==
2000–01 International Baseball League of Australia season
- League: International Baseball League of Australia
- Sport: Baseball
- Matches: 78
- Teams: 4
- Finals champions: IBLA Internationals
- Runners-up: Australia

The 2000–01 International Baseball League of Australia Development League season, also known as the Gold Coast League, was the first season the Development League was conducted. The League was held exclusively on the Gold Coast, and was contest between 4 teams, Australia, Taiwan, MLB All-Stars and Internationals.

The league was held from 29 November 2000 to 20 January 2001, The one game Championship playoff was won by the IBLA Internationals on 21 January 2001. The Internationals defeated Australia 2–1.

=== Teams ===
Location in Australia

==== Rosters ====
The 2000–01 season involved four teams: IBLA Australia, IBLA Internationals, MLB Stars and the Taiwan national Baseball team. All teams played on a home and away basis at the same two venues.

==== Venues ====
Teams in the ABL
	City	State	Stadium	Ref
Main venue	Gold Coast	Queensland	Palm Meadows	
Secondary venue	Gold Coast	Queensland	Carrara Oval	

=== Regular season ===
The regular season fixture consisted of 78 games. Each team played each other on a home and away basis.

==== Ladder ====
2000-01 IBLA Development League standings
Team	W	L	D	Pct.	GB
IBLA Internationals	25	15	3	.658	–
IBLA Australia	17	19	2	.472	3.5
Taiwan	17	19	4	.472	4.5
MLB Stars	17	25	1	.405	9

==== Statistical leaders ====
Batting leaders
Stat	Player (Note: Minimum 2.7 PAs per team game. Correct as of 17 February 2013.)	Team	Total
AVG	Jarrod Hodges	Australia	.375
HR	Robert Stratton	MLB Stars	7
RBI	Travis Wilson	IBLA Internationals	38
R	Andrew Zapp	IBLA Internationals	33
H	Andrew Zapp	IBLA Internationals	57
SB	Ryan Langerhans	IBLA Internationals	12

Pitching leaders
Stat	Player (Note: Minimum 0.8 IP per team game. Correct as of 17 February 2013.)	Team	Total
W	Chao-Hao Tseng	Taiwan	5
L	Stephen Colyer	MLB Stars	5
ERA	Luke Prokopec	Australia	0.39
K	Brad Guy	IBLA Internationals	48
IP	Chao-Hao Tseng	Taiwan	59 1/3
SV	Brad Voyles	IBLA Internationals	5

=== Postseason ===
All games for the 2001 postseason were played at Palm Meadows on the Gold Coast. All finals were a 1-game play-off.

Semifinals
19 January
IBLA Internationals	4
MLB Stars	2
19 January
Taiwan	1
IBLA Australia	3

Final
21 January
1	IBLA Internationals	2
2	IBLA Australia	1
Third place
20 January
4	MLB Stars	6
3	Taiwan	0

==== Finals Series ====
Winners of Game 1 and 2 went into Championship games, Losers of game 1 and 2 went into a playoff for 3rd.

===== Game 1 1st vs 4th: 19 January 2001 =====
Team	1	2	3	4	5	6	7	8	9	R	H	E
MLB Stars	0	0	0	2	0	0	0	0	0	2	2	0
IBLA Internationals	0	0	0	2	0	0	2	0	X	4	10	1
Home runs: MLB: ? Internationals: ?

===== Game 2 2nd vs 3rd: 19 January 2001 =====
Team	1	2	3	4	5	6	7	8	9	R	H	E
IBLA Australia	0	0	2	2	0	0	0	1	0	3	8	4
Taiwan	0	0	0	0	0	1	0	0	0	1	4	2
Home runs: Australia: ? Taiwan: ?

===== Game 3 Loser 1 vs Loser 2: 20 January 2001 =====
Team	1	2	3	4	5	6	7	8	9	R	H	E
MLB Stars	1	0	2	0	3	0	0	1	0	6	9	5
Taiwan	0	0	0	0	0	0	0	0	0	0	2	2
Home runs: MLB: ? Taiwan: ?

===== Game 4 Championship Game: 21 January 2001 =====
Team	1	2	3	4	5	6	7	8	9	R	H	E
IBLA Australia	1	0	0	0	0	0	0	0	0	1	7	0
IBLA Internationals	0	0	0	0	1	0	0	0	1	2	7	1
Home runs: Australia: ? Internationals: ?

=== Awards ===
Award	Person	Team
Most Valuable Player	Andrew Zapp	IBLA Internationals
Batting Champion	Andrew Zapp	IBLA Internationals
Golden Glove	Chi-Sheng Lin	Taiwan
Pitcher of the Year	Chao-Hao Tseng	Taiwan

=== Top Stats ===
Defensive Stats
Name	Wins	Losses	Saves	ERA
Mark Dewey	3	1	0	0.63
P.J Bevis	3	1	1	1.54
Kazuhiro Takeoka	4	0	2	1.71
Brad Guy	2	4	0	2.48
Kwang-Soo Kim	3	3	0	2.54
Phil Stockman	1	1	0	5.29

Offensive Stars
Name	Avg	HR	RBI
Andrew Zapp	.373	4	32
Travis Wilson	.352	7	38
Ryan Langerhans	.312	5	25
Ji-Hwan Sohn	.285	1	5
Scott Goodman	.271	3	24
Nicholas Green	.265	5	18

=== All-Star team ===
Position	Name	Team
Catcher	Justin Huber	IBLA Australia
1st base	Andrew Zapp	IBLA Internationals
2nd base	Chung-Yi Huang	Taiwan
3rd base	Travis Wilson	IBLA Internationals
Shortstop	Glenn Williams	IBLA Australia
Outfield	Troy Shadar	IBLA Internationals
Outfield	Jarrod Hodges	IBLA Australia
Outfield	Chris Snelling	IBLA Australia
Designated hitter	Gavin Fingleson	IBLA Internationals
Starting pitcher	Chao-Hao Tseng	Taiwan
Relief pitcher	Luke Prokopec	IBLA Australia
Manager	Chris Bando	IBLA Internationals
