= 2000–01 IBLA Internationals season =

2000–01 IBLA Internationals
- League: International Baseball League of Australia Development League
- Ballpark: Palm Meadows; Carrara Oval
- City: Gold Coast, Queensland
- Record: 25–15–3 (.616)
- Place: 1st
- Owner: Dave Nilsson
- Manager: Chris Bando

The 2000–01 IBLA Internationals season was the first season for the team. The team played in the one and only season of the International Baseball League of Australia's Development League, All games were held on the Gold Coast at Palm Meadows with some showcase games played at Carrara Oval.

The team was a composite team made up of players from countries such as Korea, Japan, South Africa, Guam, New Zealand, United States and Australia.

== Regular season ==
The regular season consisted of 43 games, All games were played at Palm Meadows with the exception of showcase games that were played at Carrara Oval.

The team was made up of players from around the world, with the majority of the team being made up of prospects from the LG Twins of the Korean Major league, Other players from the USA, New Zealand, South Africa, Japan and Australia.

=== Standings ===
2000-01 IBLA Development League standings
Team	W	L	D	Pct.	GB
IBLA Internationals	25	15	3	.658	–
IBLA Australia	17	19	2	.472	3.5
Taiwan	17	19	4	.472	4.5
MLB Stars	17	25	1	.405	9

==== Record vs opponents ====
Opponent	W–L Record	Largest Victory			Largest Defeat			Current Streak
Opponent	W–L Record	Score	Date	Ground	Score	Date	Ground	Current Streak
IBLA Australia	6-4	10-2	11 January 2001	Palm Meadows	1-11	6 December 2000	Palm Meadows	5W
MLB Stars	13-5	17-4; 14-1	23 December 2000; 9 January 2001	Palm Meadows	1-5	13 December 2000	Palm Meadows	11W
Taiwan	5-6	12-5	5 January 2001	Palm Meadows	0-7	15 January 2001	Carrara Oval	1W
Total	25–15	MLB Stars			IBLA Australia			5W
Total	25–15	17-4 14-1	23 December 2000 9 January 2001	Palm Meadows	1-11	6 December 2000	Palm Meadows	5W

=== Game log ===
W	Internationals win
L	Internationals loss
T	Internationals tie
	Game postponed
**Bold**	Internationals team member

November game log
#	Date	Opponent	Score	Win	Loss	Save	Crowd	Record	Ref
1	29 November 2000	@ MLB Stars	4-5					0-1	
2	30 November 2000	MLB Stars	1-2					0-2	

December game log
#	Date	Opponent	Score	Win	Loss	Save	Crowd	Record	Ref
3	1 December 2000	@ MLB Stars	12-3					1-2	
4	2 December 2000	MLB Stars	2-2					1-2	
5	4 December 2000	@ Australia	1-2					1-3	
6	5 December 2000	Australia	4-6					1-4	
7	6 December 2000	@ Australia	1-11					1-5	
8	7 December 2000(Carrara Oval)	@ Taiwan	0-1					1-6	
9	8 December 2000(Carrara Oval)	Taiwan	3-0					2-6	
10	9 December 2000	@ Taiwan	5-10					2-7	
11	11 December 2000	@ MLB Stars	3-7					2-8	
12	12 December 2000	MLB Stars	5-2					3-8	
13	13 December 2000	@ MLB Stars	1-5					3-9	
14	14 December 2000	@ Australia	4-3					4-9	
15	16 December 2000	@ Australia	3-4					4-10	
16	18 December 2000(Carrara Oval)	Taiwan	1-7					4-11	
17	19 December 2000(Carrara Oval)	Taiwan	2-2					4-11	
18	20 December 2000(Carrara Oval)	@ Taiwan	4-3					5-11	
19	21 December 2000	@ MLB Stars	2-3					5-12	
20	22 December 2000	MLB Stars	4-2					6-12	
21	23 December 2000	@ MLB Stars	17-4					7-12	
22	24 December 2000	MLB Stars	12-2					8-12	
23	27 December 2000	@ Taiwan	3-5					8-13	
24	30 December 2000	MLB Stars	10-2					9-13	
25	30 December 2000	Taiwan	0-2					9-14	
26	31 December 2000	@ MLB Stars	9-3					10-14	

January game log
#	Date	Opponent	Score	Win	Loss	Save	Crowd	Record	Ref
27	2 January 2001	@ MLB Stars	5-2					11-14	
28	3 January 2001	MLB Stars	13-10					12-14	
29	4 January 2001	Taiwan	3-3					12-14	
30	5 January 2001	@ Taiwan	12-5					13-14	
31	6 January 2001	Taiwan	6-2					14-14	
32	8 January 2001	@ MLB Stars	2-0					15-14	
33	9 January 2001	MLB Stars	14-1					16-14	
34	10 January 2001	@ MLB Stars	6-0					17-14	
35	11 January 2001	@ Australia	10-2					18-14	
36	12 January 2001	Australia	6-1					19-14	
37	13 January 2001	@ Australia	10-5					20-14	
38	15 January 2001(Carrara Oval)	@ Taiwan	0-7					20-15	
39	16 January 2001	MLB Stars	5-1					21-15	
40	17 January 2001	Taiwan	7-1					22-15	
41	18 January 2001	@ Australia	10-4					23-15	
42	19 January 2001	MLB Stars	4-2					24-15	
43	21 January 2001	Australia	2-1					25-15	

== Postseason ==
All games for the 2001 postseason were played at Palm Meadows on the Gold Coast. All finals were a 1 game play-off.

=== Finals Series ===
Winners of Game 1 and 2 went into Championship games, Losers of game 1 and 2 went into a playoff for 3rd.

==== Game 1 1st vs 4th: 19 January 2001 ====
Team	1	2	3	4	5	6	7	8	9	R	H	E
MLB Stars	0	0	0	2	0	0	0	0	0	2	2	0
IBLA Internationals	0	0	0	2	0	0	2	0	X	4	10	1
Home runs: MLB: ? Internationals: ?

==== Game 4 Championship Game: 21 January 2001 ====
Team	1	2	3	4	5	6	7	8	9	R	H	E
IBLA Australia	1	0	0	0	0	0	0	0	0	1	7	0
IBLA Internationals	0	0	0	0	1	0	0	0	1	2	7	1
Home runs: Australia: ? Internationals: ?

== Awards ==
Award	Person	Team
Most Valuable Player	Andrew Zapp	IBLA Internationals
Batting Champion	Andrew Zapp	IBLA Internationals

== Roster ==
IBLA Internationals roster – 2000-01 IBLA
Active roster		Coaching Staff
Pitchers Right-handed pitchers: 16 (Australia) PJ Bevis; 35 Jun-Gan Chang; 21 (United States) Mark Dewey; 1 Matt Gahan; 24 Brad Guy; 2 Kwang-Soo Kim; 27 Min-Ki Kim; 18 Paul Mutch; 22 (England) Phil Stockman; 26 Daniel Thomson; 6 (United States) Brad Voyles; Left-handed pitchers	Catchers: 7 Mitch Evans; 20 (United States) Brandon Harper; Infielders: 4 (United States) Nicholas Green; 3 Ji-Hwan Sohn; 17 Andrew Zapp; Outfielders: 0 Scott Goodman; 12 Paul Gorman; 29 (United States) Ryan Langerhans; 11 Steven Ryderen; 5 Marc Taintey; 10 Adam Wardrop; 14 (New Zealand) Travis Wilson	Manager: - (United States) Chris Bando; Coaches: - (United States) Ron Johnson; - Cheol-Young Park
Current as of January 2001.
