= 2000–01 IBLA Australia season =

2000–01 IBLA Australia
- League: International Baseball League of Australia Development League
- Ballpark: Palm Meadows; Carrara Oval
- City: Gold Coast, Queensland
- Record: 17–19–2 (.474)
- Place: 2nd
- Owner: Dave Nilsson
- Manager: Jon Deeble

The 2000–01 IBLA Australia season was the first season for the team. The team played in the one and only season of the International Baseball League of Australia's Development League, All games were held on the Gold Coast at Palm Meadows with some showcase games played at Carrara Oval.

The team was made up of then current players on the Australia national baseball team. The team was coached by former Australian Baseball League player/coach of the Melbourne Monarchs and Australian Head Coach Jon Deeble with assistant Coaches Phil Dale of the former Melbourne Reds & Monarchs and Greg Jelks of the former Perth Heat.

== Regular season ==
The regular season consisted of 43 games, All games were played at Palm Meadows with the exception of showcase games that were played at Carrara Oval.

=== Standings ===
2000-01 IBLA Development League standings
Team	W	L	D	Pct.	GB
IBLA Internationals	25	15	3	.658	–
IBLA Australia	17	19	2	.472	3.5
Taiwan	17	19	4	.472	4.5
MLB Stars	17	25	1	.405	9

==== Record vs opponents ====
Opponent	W–L Record	Largest Victory			Largest Defeat			Current Streak
Opponent	W–L Record	Score	Date	Ground	Score	Date	Ground	Current Streak
IBLA Internationals	5-6	11-1	6 December 2000	Palm Meadows	2-10	11 January 2001	Palm Meadows	5L
MLB Stars	6-5	8-2	4 January 2001	Palm Meadows	5-10	19 December 2000	Palm Meadows	2L
Taiwan	7-8	12-1	9 January 2001	Carrara Oval	8-13	22 December 2000	Palm Meadows	1W
Total	17–19	Taiwan			IBLA Internationals			1L
Total	17–19	12-1	22 December 2000	Carrara Oval	2-10	11 January 2001	Palm Meadows	1L

=== Game log ===
W	Australia win
L	Australia loss
T	Australia tie
	Game postponed
**Bold**	Australian team member

November game log
#	Date	Opponent	Score	Win	Loss	Save	Crowd	Record	Ref
1	29 November 2000 (Carrara Oval)	@ Taiwan	2-5					0-1	
2	30 November 2000 (Carrara Oval)	Taiwan	4-5					0-2	

December game log
#	Date	Opponent	Score	Win	Loss	Save	Crowd	Record	Ref
3	1 December 2000 (Carrara Oval)	@ Taiwan	12-4					1-2	
4	2 December 2000	Taiwan	2-0					2-2	
5	4 December 2000	Internationals	2-1					3-2	
6	5 December 2000	@ Internationals	6-4					4-2	
7	6 December 2000	Internationals	11-1					5-2	
8	7 December 2000	@ MLB Stars	5-3					6-2	
9	8 December 2000	MLB Stars	4-5					6-3	
10	9 December 2000	MLB Stars	4-0					7-3	
11	11 December 2000 (Carrara Oval)	Taiwan	5-1					8-3	
12	12 December 2000 (Carrara Oval)	@ Taiwan	5-3					9-3	
13	13 December 2000 (Carrara Oval)	Taiwan	1-0					10-3	
14	14 December 2000	Internationals	3-4					10-4	
15	16 December 2000	Internationals	4-3					11-4	
16	18 December 2000	MLB Stars	2-4					11-5	
17	19 December 2000	@ MLB Stars	5-10					11-6	
18	20 December 2000	MLB Stars	3-2					12-6	
19	21 December 2000	Taiwan	4-7					12-7	
20	22 December 2000	@ Taiwan	8-13					12-8	
21	23 December 2000	Taiwan	5-5					12-8	

January game log
#	Date	Opponent	Score	Win	Loss	Save	Crowd	Record	Ref
22	2 January 2001 (Carrara Oval)	Taiwan	2-3					12-9	
23	3 January 2001 (Carrara Oval)	@ Taiwan	6-7					12-10	
24	4 January 2001	MLB Stars	8-2					13-10	
25	5 January 2001	@ MLB Stars	4-1					14-10	
26	6 January 2001	MLB Stars	12-10					15-10	
27	8 January 2001 (Carrara Oval)	Taiwan	2-2					15-10	
28	9 January 2001 (Carrara Oval)	@ Taiwan	12-1					16-10	
29	10 January 2001 (Carrara Oval)	Taiwan	2-4					16-11	
30	11 January 2001	Internationals	2-10					16-12	
40	12 January 2001	@ Internationals	1-6					16-13	
41	13 January 2001	Internationals	5-10					16-14	
42	15 January 2001	MLB Stars	10-12					16-15	
43	16 January 2001	@ Taiwan	6-7					16-16	
44	17 January 2001	@ MLB Stars	10-14					16-17	
45	18 January 2001	Internationals	4-10					16-18	
46	19 January 2001	@ Taiwan	3-1					17-18	
47	21 January 2001	@ Internationals	1-2					17-19	

== Postseason ==
All games for the 2001 postseason were played at Palm Meadows on the Gold Coast. All finals were a 1-game play-off.

=== Finals Series ===
Winners of Game 1 and 2 went into Championship games, Losers of game 1 and 2 went into a playoff for 3rd.

==== Game 2 2nd vs 3rd: 19 January 2001 ====
Team	1	2	3	4	5	6	7	8	9	R	H	E
IBLA Australia	0	0	2	2	0	0	0	1	0	3	8	4
Taiwan	0	0	0	0	0	1	0	0	0	1	4	2
Home runs: Australia: ? Taiwan: ?

==== Game 4 Championship Game: 21 January 2001 ====
Team	1	2	3	4	5	6	7	8	9	R	H	E
IBLA Australia	1	0	0	0	0	0	0	0	0	1	7	0
IBLA Internationals	0	0	0	0	1	0	0	0	1	2	7	1
Home runs: Australia: ? Internationals: ?

== Awards ==
Award	Person	Team
No Awards Won		

== Roster ==
IBLA Australia roster – 2000-01 IBLA
Active roster		Coaching Staff
Pitchers Right-handed pitchers: 35 (Australia) Brett Baker; 31 (Australia) Simon Beresford; 33 (Australia) Anthony Collis; 40 (Australia) Craig Lewis; 29 (Australia) Wayne Lundgren; (Australia) Leigh Neuge; 55 (Australia) Luke Prokopec; 42 (Australia) Ben Rowe; Left-handed pitchers: (Australia) Andrew Cooke; 15 (Australia) Travis Blackley; 36 (Australia) Duane Rochford	Catchers: 19 (Australia) Ben Foster; 39 (Australia) Justin Huber; Infielders: 9 (Australia) Mathew Buckley; 7 (Australia) Trent Durrington; 4 (South Africa) Gavin Fingleson; 10 (Australia) Adam Morrissey; (Australia) Ben Risinger; 17 (Australia) Brett Roneberg; 43 (Australia) Dane Tomaszwski; 18 (Australia) Glenn Williams; Outfielders: 38 (Australia) Jarrod Hodges; 24 (Australia) Chris Snelling; 8 (Australia) Marc Taintey; (Australia) Paul Weichard	Manager: (Australia) Jon Deeble; Coaches: (Australia) Phil Dale; (Australia) Tony Harris; (Australia) Greg Jelks
Current as of January 2001.
