= James Beresford (baseball) =

Australian baseball player (born 1989)

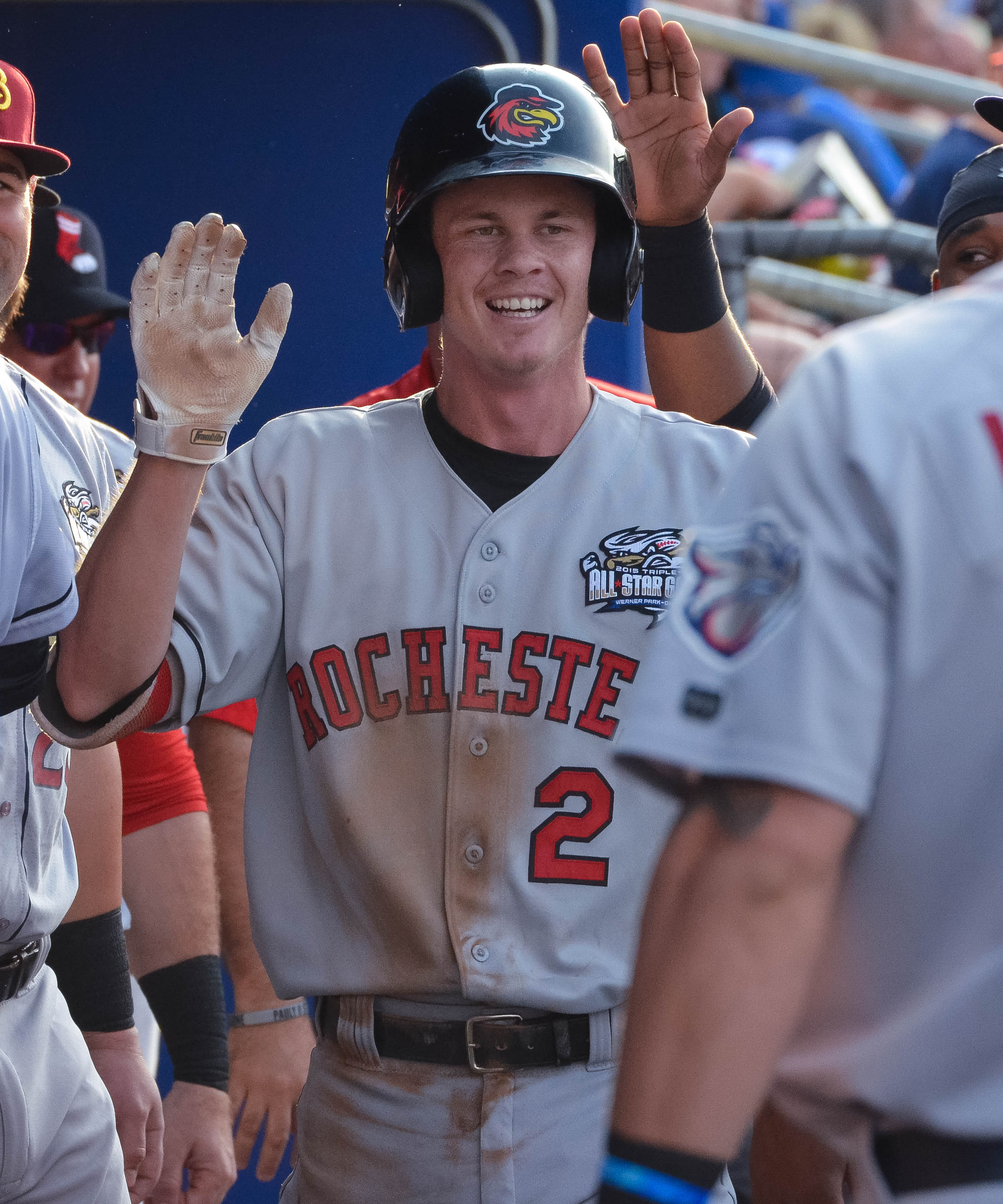
- Beresford, during his tenure with the Rochester Red Wings, at 2015 Triple-A All-Star Game
- Shortstop
- Born: 19 January 1989 (age 37); Mount Waverley, Victoria, Australia
- Batted: Left Threw: Right

MLB debut
- 10 September, 2016, for the Minnesota Twins

Last MLB appearance
- 1 October, 2016, for the Minnesota Twins

MLB statistics
- Batting average: .227
- Home runs: 0
- Runs batted in: 0
- Stats at Baseball Reference

Teams
- Minnesota Twins (2016)

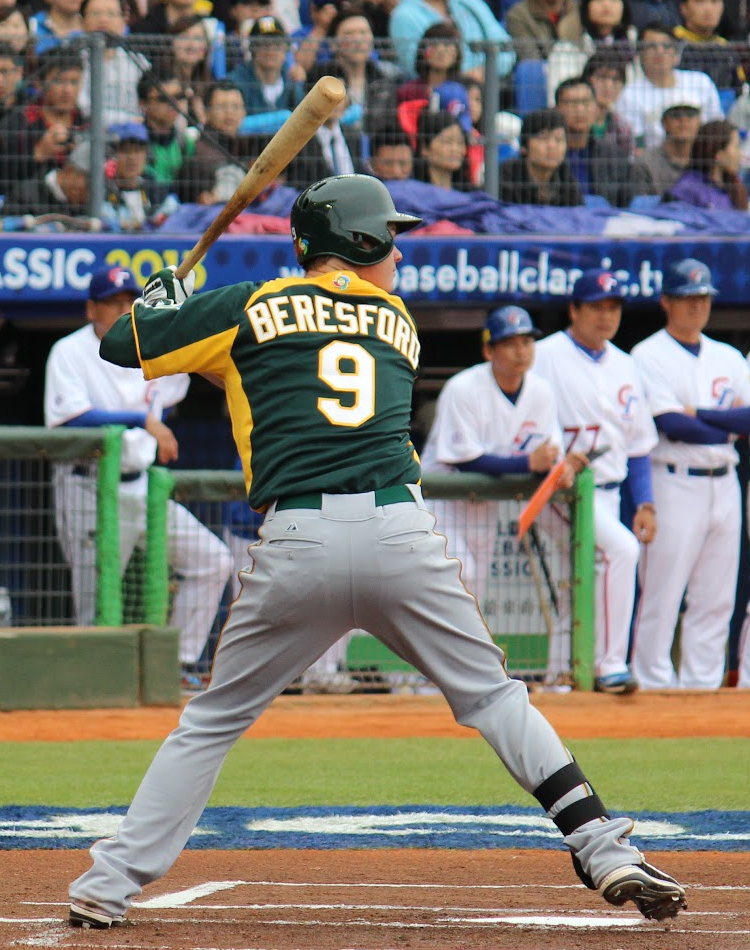
Beresford batting for the Australia national team in 2013 World Baseball Classic – Pool B

James “Noodles” Richard Beresford (born 19 January 1989) is an Australian former professional baseball infielder. He played in Major League Baseball (MLB) in 2016 for the Minnesota Twins.

== Career ==
Beresford played with the Waverley Baseball Club where he was named as club MVP before being signed with the Twins organization in 2005 at age 16. He debuted for the Victoria Aces in Claxton Shield 2006 replacing Justin Huber after he withdrew. Due to a torn labrum, he missed the 2006 minor league season. In the 2007 Claxton Shield, he averaged .304 for Australian Provincial. He returned to the US in 2007 making his debut and hitting a .288/.349/.302 clip as the starting shortstop for the Gulf Coast League Twins. He played again in Claxton Shield 2008 and went 2 for 7. In the 2008 minor league season, he batted a .246/.345/.285 clip for the Elizabethton Twins. In 2009, he was named in the final Australia national baseball team for the 2009 World Baseball Classic in March, and was again selected for the 2009 Baseball World Cup in September.

In 2009, Beresford was named Beloit Snappers player of the year.

In 2011, Beresford hit for a .270 average in 485 at-bats for the Fort Myers Miracle following a switch to second. On 20 November 2012, Beresford re-signed with the Twins organization on a minor league contract. He elected free agency on 6 November 2015.

On 8 December 2015, Beresford re–signed with the Twins on a minor league contract. On 6 September 2016, Beresford was selected to the 40-man roster and promoted to the major leagues for the first time. In 10 games during his rookie campaign, he batted .227/.261/.273 with one walk. On 17 October, Beresford was removed from the 40–man roster and sent outright to the Triple–A Rochester Red Wings. He elected free agency following the season on 7 November.

The last professional appearance for Beresford was with the Melbourne Aces 29 January 2017. He played 54 games and hit .307 in the Australian Baseball League between 2011 and 2017.

== Personal ==
His older brother, Simon Beresford, played minor league baseball for the Milwaukee Brewers organization.
