= 2000–01 Taiwan national baseball team season =

2000–01 Taiwan national baseball team
- League: International Baseball League of Australia Development League
- Ballpark: Palm Meadows; Carrara Oval
- City: Gold Coast, Queensland
- Record: 17–19–4 (.475)
- Place: 3rd
- Manager: Lin, Hua-Wei

The 2000-01 Taiwan season was the first season for the Taiwan national baseball team in the International Baseball League of Australia's Development League. The team played in the one and only season. All games were held on the Gold Coast at Palm Meadows with some showcase games played at Carrara Oval.

The team's roster was a mix of professional and amateur players from the countries various Leagues. The team was the national team selected for the 2001 Asian Baseball Championship.

== Regular season ==
The regular season consisted of 42 games, All games were played at Palm Meadows with the exception of showcase games that were played at Carrara Oval.

=== Standings ===
2000-01 IBLA Development League standings
Team	W	L	D	Pct.	GB
IBLA Internationals	25	15	3	.658	–
IBLA Australia	17	19	2	.472	3.5
Taiwan	17	19	4	.472	4.5
MLB Stars	17	25	1	.405	9

==== Record vs opponents ====
Opponent	W–L Record	Largest Victory			Largest Defeat			Current Streak
Opponent	W–L Record	Score	Date	Ground	Score	Date	Ground	Current Streak
IBLA Australia	-	-			-			
IBLA Internationals	-	-			-			
MLB Stars	-	-			-			
Total	–							
Total	–	-			-			

=== Game log ===
W	Taiwan win
L	Taiwan loss
T	Taiwan tie
	Game postponed
**Bold**	Taiwan team member

2000-01 Game Log
November

#	Date	Opponent	Score	Win	Loss	Save	Crowd	Record	Ref
1	29 October 2000 (Carrara Oval)	Australia	5-2					1-0	
2	30 October 2000 (Carrara Oval)	@ Australia	5-4					2-0	

December

#	Date	Opponent	Score	Win	Loss	Save	Crowd	Record	Ref
3	1 December 2000 (Carrara Oval)	Australia	4-12					2-1	
4	2 December 2000	@ Australia	3-2					2-2	
5	4 December 2000 (Carrara Oval)	MLB Stars	2-2					3-2	
6	5 December 2000 (Carrara Oval)	@ MLB Stars	2-4					3-3	
7	6 December 2000 (Carrara Oval)	MLB Stars	2-8					3-4	
8	7 December 2000 (Carrara Oval)	Internationals	1-0					4-4	
9	8 December 2000 (Carrara Oval)	@ Internationals	0-3					4-5	
10	9 December 2000	Internationals	10-5					5-5	
11	11 December 2000 (Carrara Oval)	@ Australia	1-5					5-6	
12	12 December 2000 (Carrara Oval)	Australia	3-5					5-7	
13	13 December 2000 (Carrara Oval)	@ Australia	0-1					5-8	
14	14 December 2000 (Carrara Oval)	MLB Stars	4-3					6-8	
15	16 December 2000	MLB Stars	3-2					7-8	
16	18 December 2000 (Carrara Oval)	@ Internationals	7-1					8-8	
17	19 December 2000 (Carrara Oval)	@ Internationals	2-2					8-8	
18	20 December 2000 (Carrara Oval)	Internationals	2-4					8-9	
19	21 December 2000	@ Australia	7-4					9-9	
20	22 December 2000	Australia	13-8					10-9	
21	23 December 2000	@ Australia	5-5					10-9	
22	27 December 2000	Internationals	5-3					11-9	
23	27 December 2000	MLB Stars	4-16					10-10	
24	30 December 2000	@ Internationals	2-0					11-10	
25	31 December 2000	@ MLB Stars	0-3					11-11	

December

#	Date	Opponent	Score	Win	Loss	Save	Crowd	Record	Ref
26	2 January 2000 (Carrara Oval)	@ Australia	3-2					12-11	
27	3 January 2001 (Carrara Oval)	Australia	7-6					13-11	
28	4 January 2001	@ Internationals	3-3					13-11	
29	5 January 2001	Internationals	5-12					13-12	
30	6 January 2001	@ Internationals	2-6					13-13	
31	8 January 2001 (Carrara Oval)	@ Australia	2-2					13-13	
32	9 January 2001 (Carrara Oval)	Australia	1-12					13-14	
33	10 January 2001 (Carrara Oval)	@ Australia	4-2					14-14	
34	11 January 2001 (Carrara Oval)	MLB Stars	6-4					15-14	
35	12 January 2001 (Carrara Oval)	@ MLB Stars	0-2					15-15	
36	13 January 2001	@ MLB Stars	4-2					16-15	
37	15 January 2001 (Carrara Oval)	Internationals	7-0					17-15	
38	16 January 2001	Australia	7-6					18-15	
39	17 January 2001	@ Internationals	1-7					18-16	
40	18 January 2001	MLB Stars	2-7					18-17	
41	19 January 2001	Australia	1-3					18-18	
42	20 January 2001	MLB Stars	0-6					18-19	

== Postseason ==
All games for the 2001 postseason were played at Palm Meadows on the Gold Coast. All finals were a 1-game play-off.

=== Finals Series ===
Winners of Game 1 and 2 went into Championship games, Losers of game 1 and 2 went into a playoff for 3rd.

==== Game 2 2nd vs 3rd: 19 January 2001 ====
Team	1	2	3	4	5	6	7	8	9	R	H	E
IBLA Australia	0	0	2	2	0	0	0	1	0	3	8	4
Taiwan	0	0	0	0	0	1	0	0	0	1	4	2
Home runs: Australia: ? Taiwan: ?

==== Game 3 Loser 1 vs Loser 2: 20 January 2001 ====
Team	1	2	3	4	5	6	7	8	9	R	H	E
MLB Stars	1	0	2	0	3	0	0	1	0	6	9	5
Taiwan	0	0	0	0	0	0	0	0	0	0	2	2
Home runs: MLB: ? Taiwan: ?

== Awards ==
Award	Person	Team
Golden Glove	Chi-Sheng Lin	Taiwan
Pitcher of the Year	Chao-Hao Tseng	Taiwan

== Roster ==
Taiwan national Baseball team roster – 2000-01 IBLA
Active roster		Coaching Staff
Pitchers Right-handed pitchers: 53 (Taiwan) Chen Jung-Chao; 51 (Taiwan) Chuang Hung-Liang; 45 (Taiwan) Liu Yu-Chan; 17 (Taiwan) Tsai Chung-Nan; 39 (Taiwan) Tseng Chao-Hao; 23 (Taiwan) Wang Kuo-Cheng; 18 (Taiwan) Wang Kuo-Chin; 46 (Taiwan) Yang Chien-Fu; Left-handed pitchers: 47 (Taiwan) Hsieh Fu-Kuei; 13 (Taiwan) Huang Chin Chih	Catchers: 2 (Taiwan) Kao Chih-Kang; 22 (Taiwan) Tang Chieh-Chuan; 27 (Taiwan) Yeh Chun-Chang; Infielders: 49 (Taiwan) Chang Tai-Shan; 31 (Taiwan) Cheng Chang-Ming; 56 (Taiwan) Chi Chun-Lin; 3 (Taiwan) Huang Chung-Yi; 12 (Taiwan) Lin Chih-Sheng; 54 (Taiwan) Wang Shih-Hua; Outfielders: 50 (Taiwan) Chen Chih-Yuan; 5 (Taiwan) Chen Lien-Hung; 10 (Taiwan) Chou Szu-Chi; 29 (Taiwan) Lin Chin-Ping; 1 (Taiwan) Wang, Chien-Ming; 8 (Taiwan) Yang Sun-Hsuan	Manager: (Taiwan) Lin, Hua-Wei; Coaches: (Taiwan) Yeh, Chih-Shien; (Taiwan) Shiau, Wen-Sheng; (Taiwan) Sakai, Mitsujiro; (Taiwan) Chian, Yen-Hao (Trainer)
Current as of January 2001.
