= Daniel Berg (baseball) =

Australian baseball player (born 1984)

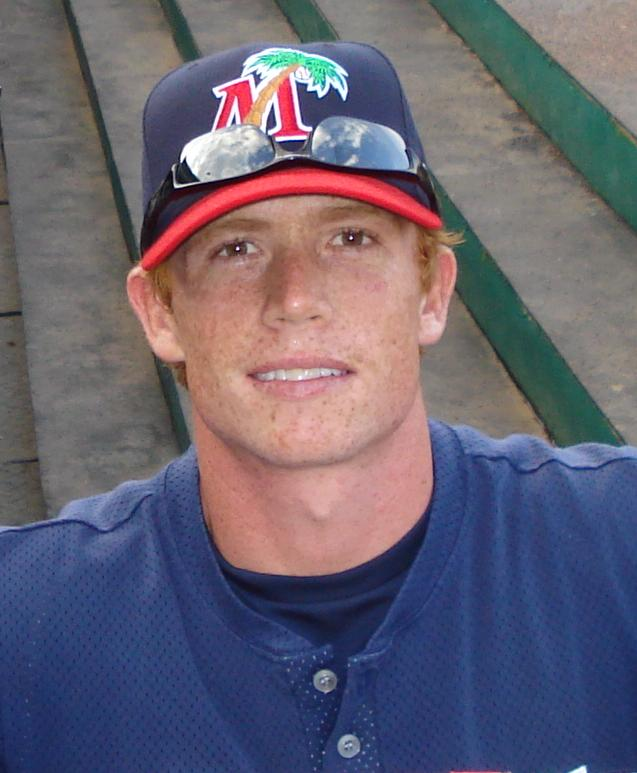
- Utility
- Born: 21 November 1984 (age 41); Glen Iris, Australia
- Bats: Right Throws: Right
- Stats at Baseball Reference

Teams
- Gulf Coast Twins (2005); Elizabethton Twins (2006); Beloit Snappers (2006–2007); Fort Myers Miracle (2008–2009); New Britain Rock Cats (2008–2009); Grand Prairie AirHogs (2009); Victoria Aces (2004–2009)

Daniel Jack Berg (born 21 November 1984) was born in Glen Iris, Victoria, Australia. He moved to the United States to further his baseball career after debuting with the Victoria Aces in the 2003 Claxton Shield.

== American career ==
After travelling to the United States to play college ball for Texarkana College, Berg was drafted by the Minnesota Twins in the 30th round of the 2004 Major League Baseball draft. He debuted professionally in the US in 2005, hitting .159 for the rookie-level Gulf Coast League Twins.

Berg split his second season in the Twins' organization, 2006, between the Beloit Snappers batting at a .192/.313/.308 clip, and the Elizabethton Twins, where he hit .253/.353/.466. Over the course of the season, he played every infield position but pitcher and shortstop. He spent the 2007 minor league season with Beloit, struggling again with .214/.298/.291 in 101 games. He played five different positions (1B, 3B, C, RF and LF) in addition to DH.

Berg split the 2008 season between the Fort Myers Miracle (.279/.381/.414 in 67 games) and the New Britain Rock Cats (.255/.327/.319 in 15 games). In 2009, Berg hit just .210 in 60 games between New Britain and Fort Myers, and was designated for assignment. On 24 July, he signed with the Grand Prairie AirHogs of the independent American Association of Independent Professional Baseball. In 36 games with Grand Prairie, he batted .252 with three home runs and sixteen RBI.

== Australian career ==
In the 2006 Claxton Shield, he went 8 for 18 with a tournament best eleven walks in seven games for the Aces. In the 2007 Claxton Shield, Berg batted .259 for Victoria to help them win the Shield title.

Berg starred in the Claxton Shield 2008, hitting .400/.429/.750 with 3 home runs, second to Olympic Silver Medalist Tom Brice. Daniel was selected for the Australian national baseball team in the 2008 Final Olympic Qualification Tournament and played regularly, batting .308/.367/.462 with seven runs in seven games.

Berg was on the Australian roster for the 2009 World Baseball Classic. He backed up James Beresford at second base and was held hitless in three at bats. He was also a member of the Australian team that finished fifth in the 2009 Baseball World Cup.
