= Gavin Fingleson =

South African baseball player (born 1976)

- Second baseman
- Born: 5 August 1976 (age 49); Johannesburg, Transvaal, South Africa
- Bats: Switch Throws: Right
- Stats at Baseball Reference

Teams
- Chiayi-Tainan Luka (2001)
Medals
Men's baseball
Representing Australia
Olympics
Silver medal – second place	2004 Athens	Team competition

Gavin Fingleson (born 5 August 1976) is a South African born-Australian switch-hitting former professional baseball player. Primarily a second baseman, he has also played designated hitter, third base, shortstop, and first base.

== Early life ==
Fingelson is Jewish, and was born in Johannesburg, South Africa. He and his family moved to Australia when he was 11 years old.

He was named the Maccabi World Union Australian Sportsman of the Year three times, and was named NSW Jewish Sportsman of the Year six times. He played six years for Ku-Ring-gai Stealers Baseball Club youth teams as a teenager.

== College ==
Fingleson went to Masada College, where he played a lot of baseball. He also attended Southeastern Louisiana University in Hammond, Louisiana, playing baseball. There, in 1998 he batted .367/.398/.468, and in 1999 he batted .373/.383/.469, playing third base both years.

== Professional career ==
Fingleson went into the independent leagues in 1999, where he tied for fifth in the Texas–Louisiana League with a .350 batting average for the Bayou Bullfrogs, as he played second base and shortstop. In the 1999–2000 International Baseball League of Australia, he hit .386. Had he qualified, he would have led the IBLA in average; he made the All-Star team as the top designated hitter.

In 2000, Fingleson hit .348 for the Catskill Cougars, placing him fourth in the Eastern Division of the Northern League, as he played second base, third base, and shortstop. The Cougars were loaded with Australians as teammates, including Greg Jelks and Brendan Kingman. In the 2000–01 IBLA, he batted .314 to finish fourth in average and third in hits with 49; only A. J. Zapp, Travis Wilson, and Glenn Williams had better batting averages. He struck out in only nine of his 156 at bats, the lowest rate in the circuit. He again made the league All-Star team at designated hitter.

Fingleson hit .298 for the 2001 St. Paul Saints of the Northern League, playing third base, second base, and shortstop. He then went to the Taiwan Major League to play for the Chiayi-Tainan Luka, hitting .369 in 26 games. In the 2001 Baseball World Cup, Fingleson batted .269 as Australia's primary second baseman. After starting the 2002 or for Chiayi, he was released.

Fingleson went 12-for-29 with five doubles, three walks, five runs, and seven RBIs for the New South Wales Patriots in the 2004 Claxton Shield. He tied for the most hits and extra-base hits and made the All-Star team at second base. He then signed with the New Haven County Cutters and hit .299 in 37 games.

In 2004, he was part of the Australian Olympic baseball team, that won a silver medal in the baseball tournament at the Athens Olympics. He ranked among the Olympic leaders in hits with 13, tied with Brett Roneberg for fifth, and RBIs tied with Rodney van Buizen and Eriel Sánchez for third. He became the first Jewish Australian to win an Olympic medal.

That year he also played second base and third base for the New Haven County Cutters of the independent Northeast League, and hit .299.

With the Claxton Shield, Fingleson hit .259. He slumped to .231 as Australia's second basemen in the 2005 Baseball World Cup. During the Claxton Shield 2006 tournament, he batted .391 with six runs in six games.

In 2006, he was an infielder for the Australian team at the World Baseball Classic. In the World Baseball Classic, Fingleson went one-for-five. Fellow countryman Andrew Graham was also on the squad.

He hit .370 with seven walks in eight games for New South Wales in the 2007 Claxton Shield. In the 2007 Baseball World Cup, he hit .286 with five runs and five RBIs in five games; he played third base and first base.

In October 2009, he was appointed the fielding coach of the Sri Lankan Cricket Team.

In 2012 he was inducted into the Maccabi NSW Hall of Fame.

In 2017, at the age of 41 after having been retired for eight years, he played second base for the Sydney Blue Sox of the Australian Baseball League, and hit .208 in 14 games.

== See also ==
- List of select Jewish baseball players
