= Daniel Berg =

Daniel Berg may refer to:

- Daniel Berg (educator) (born 1929), American scientist, educator and president of Rensselaer Polytechnic Institute
- Daniel Berg (baseball) (born 1984), Australian baseball player
- Daniel Berg (evangelist) (1884–1963), Swedish Pentecostal evangelist missionary
- Daniel Domscheit-Berg (born 1978), German technology activist
- Daniel Berg (basketball) (born 1986), Norwegian basketball player
- Daniel Berg (politician) (born 1988), Hungarian-American politician
