= Matthew Gahan =

Australian baseball player

- Pitcher
- Born: 26 November 1975 (age 50); Lismore, New South Wales
- Bats: Right Throws: Right
- Stats at Baseball Reference

Matthew Gahan (born 26 November 1975 in Lismore, New South Wales) is an Australian former baseball player who played for the Australian national team.

== Career ==
Gahan was signed in 2000 by the New York Mets organisation and played with the Brooklyn Cyclones and Capital City Bombers in 2001, before being promoted to Advanced A with the St. Lucie Mets in 2002. Gahan also played in the International Baseball League of Australia with the International All-Stars in 2000/2001. He played Claxton Shield with the Queensland Rams (as Lismore is considered part of Baseball Queensland), including a Golden Arm award in the 2006 Claxton Shield, and made his national debut in 2002, including appearances in the 2006 World Baseball Classic.
