= Mathew Buckley =

Australian baseball player

Personal information
- Born: 22 January 1973 (age 53) Sydney, Australia
- Height: 186 cm (6 ft 1 in)

Sport
- Country: Australia
- Sport: Baseball

Mathew Buckley (born 22 January 1973) is an Australian baseball player. He represented Australia at the 2000 Summer Olympics. Buckley also played in the 2000-01 International Baseball League of Australia season.
