= 2008 Claxton Shield =

- Sport: Baseball
- Defending champions: Victoria Aces (2007)
- Duration: 28 December 2007 – 2 February 2008
- Teams: 6

Regular season
- First place: New South Wales Patriots (9-3)
- Second place: Perth Heat (8-4)
- Third place: Queensland Rams (8-4)
- Fourth place: Victoria Aces (7-5)
- Fifth place: South Australia (3–9)
- Sixth place: Australian Provincial (1-11)

Finals series
- Champions: Perth Heat (9th title)
- Runners-up: New South Wales Patriots

Seasons
- ← 2007 2009 →

The 74th Claxton Shield was held from 28 December 2007 to 10 February 2008. The 2008 Shield was conducted on a Home and Away series made up of 2 Divisions; Eastern Division: Australian Provincial, New South Wales Patriots and the Queensland Rams, Southern Division: Perth Heat, Victoria Aces and South Australia. Each divisional series saw each team meet 6 times with 3 home games and 3 away games, the top team from each division then meet in a 3-game Championship series. The Perth Heat defeated the New South Wales Patriots in two games to win their 9th Shield.

== Teams ==
2008 Claxton Shield teams

The 2008 Claxton Shield was contested between six teams from around Australia, divided into two divisions.

2008 Claxton Shield team rosters

=== Southern Division ===
- Perth Heat
  - Baseball Park
- South Australia
  - Woodville Oval
- Victoria Aces
  - Melbourne Ballpark

=== Eastern Division ===
- Australia Provincial
  - Narrabundah Baseball Park
- New South Wales Patriots
  - Blacktown Baseball Stadium
- Queensland Rams
  - Redlands Baseball Park
  - Holloway Field

== Match results ==
=== Southern Division ===
==== 28 December 2007 at 3.30 pm, Woodville Oval ====
Team	1	2	3	4	5	6	7	8	9	10	R	H	E
Victoria Aces	0	0	0	0	3	1	0	1	2	2	9	18	4
South Australia	1	1	1	2	0	2	0	0	0	0	8	12	1
Starting pitchers: Aces: D Barker; SA: J Challinor; WP: M Blackmore (1-0) LP: J Rex (0-1); Home runs: Aces: 3, D Berg, P Stokes, A Russell; SA: 1, T Brice Attendance:

==== 29 December 2007 at 11.00 am, Woodville Oval ====
Team	1	2	3	4	5	6	7	8	9	R	H	E
Victoria Aces	0	0	1	0	1	0	0	5	2	9	14	1
South Australia	0	2	0	0	0	0	0	6	0	8	9	4
Starting pitchers: Aces: B Wilson; SA: D Fidge; WP: G Karlsen (1-0) LP: J Tols (0-1) Sv: M Blackmore (1); Home runs: Aces: 1, A Russell; SA: 1, T Brice Attendance:

==== 29 December 2007 at 3.30 pm, Woodville Oval ====
Team	1	2	3	4	5	6	7	8	9	R	H	E
Victoria Aces	0	1	1	0	3	0	1	0	7	13	17	1
South Australia	0	0	4	4	1	1	0	0	0	10	15	1
Starting pitchers: Aces: J Blejwas; SA: C Lawson; WP: A Dewar LP: T Fiebig; Home runs: Aces: 1; T Williams; SA: 6–2; D Berg. 1; P Rutgers, P Stokes, R Johnston, T Brice. Attendance:

==== 3 January 2008 at 7.30 pm, Baseball Park ====
Team	1	2	3	4	5	6	7	8	9	R	H	E
South Australia	0	2	0	0	0	1	0	3	0	6	9	0
Perth Heat	0	0	0	0	0	0	0	0	0	0	6	2
Starting pitchers: SA: J Challinor; Heat: B Thomas; WP: J Challinor (1-0) LP: B Thomas (0-1); Home runs: SA: 0 Heat: 0 Attendance:

==== 4 January 2008 at 7.30 pm, Baseball Park ====
Team	1	2	3	4	5	6	7	8	9	R	H	E
South Australia	0	0	0	0	1	0	0	2	0	3	7	2
Perth Heat	2	0	0	0	4	0	4	0	-	10	9	1
Starting pitchers: SA: C Lawson; Heat: M Kelly; WP: M Kelly (1-0) LP: C Lawson (0-1); Home runs: SA: 0 Heat: 1, A de San Miguel Attendance:

==== 5 January 2008 at 7.30 pm, Baseball Park ====
Team	1	2	3	4	5	6	7	8	9	R	H	E
South Australia	0	2	0	0	0	0	0	0	0	2	5	2
Perth Heat	0	0	1	3	0	0	3	1	-	8	14	1
Starting pitchers: SA: D Ruzic; Heat: L Hendriks; WP: L Hendriks (1-0) LP: D Ruzic (0-1); Home runs: SA: 0 Heat: 0 Attendance:

==== 11 January 2008 at 7.00 pm, Melbourne Ballpark ====
Team	1	2	3	4	5	6	7	8	9	R	H	E
Perth Heat	2	0	0	0	1	0	1	2	0	6	11	0
Victoria Aces	0	2	1	1	0	0	1	0	0	5	14	3
Starting pitchers: Heat: M Kelly; Aces: D Hendricks; WP: D Peacock (1-0) LP: A Dewar (0-1) Sv: B Wise (1); Home runs: Heat: 0 Aces: 0 Attendance:573

==== 12 January 2008 at 3.00 pm, Melbourne Ballpark ====
Team	1	2	3	4	5	6	7	8	9	R	H	E
Perth Heat	2	0	3	0	1	0	2	0	0	8	11	2
Victoria Aces	0	0	1	0	0	0	0	1	3	5	13	2
Starting pitchers: Heat: L Hendriks; Aces: G Wiltshire; WP: L Hendriks (1-0) LP: G Wiltshire (0-1) Sv: D Peacock (1); Home runs: Heat: 0 Aces: 0 Attendance:603

==== 12 January 2008 at 7.00 pm, Melbourne Ballpark ====
Team	1	2	3	4	5	6	7	8	9	R	H	E
Perth Heat	1	1	0	0	0	1	0	0	0	3	10	0
Victoria Aces	1	0	1	1	0	0	1	0	X	4	9	2
Starting pitchers: Heat: B Thomas; Aces: B Flemming; WP: L Hogan (1-0) LP: B Thomas (0-1) Sv: M Blackmore (1); Home runs: Heat: 0 Aces: 0 Attendance:661

==== 18 January 2008 at 3.30 pm, Woodville Oval ====
Team	1	2	3	4	5	6	7	8	9	R	H	E
Perth Heat	1	0	2	0	6	2	0	X	X	11	13	0
South Australia	0	0	0	0	0	0	0	X	X	0	2	1
Starting pitchers: Heat: L Hendriks; SA: T Merrill; WP: L Hendriks (1-0 LP: T Merrill (0-1); Home runs: Heat: 1, M Graham; SA: 0 Attendance:

==== 19 January 2008 at 11.00 am, Woodville Oval ====
Team	1	2	3	4	5	6	7	8	9	R	H	E
Perth Heat	0	0	6	0	0	0	0	0	0	6	10	0
South Australia	0	0	0	0	0	1	1	0	1	3	6	1
Starting pitchers: Heat: M Kelly; SA: D Ruzic; WP: M Kelly (1-0) LP: D Ruzic (0-1); Home runs: Heat: 1; C Balgera; SA: 2; T Brice, B Pett Attendance:

==== 19 January 2008 at 3.30 pm, Woodville Oval ====
Team	1	2	3	4	5	6	7	8	9	R	H	E
Perth Heat	0	0	0	0	0	0	0	0	0	0	4	0
South Australia	0	2	0	0	0	2	0	0	X	4	12	0
Starting pitchers: Heat: S Mitchinson; SA: J Challinor; WP: J Challinor (1-0) LP: S Mitchinson (0-1) Sv: D Fidge (1); Home runs: Heat: 0 SA: 0 Attendance:

==== 24 January 2008 at 7.30 pm, Baseball Park ====
Team	1	2	3	4	5	6	7	8	9	R	H	E
Victoria Aces	0	0	0	0	0	0	2	1	3	6	8	2
Perth Heat	1	0	1	0	0	0	0	1	1	4	12	3
Starting pitchers: Aces: G Wiltshire; Heat: L Hendriks; WP: R Spear LP: C Goadby Sv: M Blackmore; Home runs: Aces: 0 Heat: 0 Attendance:

==== 25 January 2008 at 7.30 pm, Baseball Park ====
Team	1	2	3	4	5	6	7	8	9	R	H	E
Victoria Aces	0	0	0	0	0	1	0	1	0	2	7	1
Perth Heat	1	0	0	0	0	3	1	2	X	7	12	0
Starting pitchers: Aces: B Wilson; Heat: M Kelly; WP: M Kelly LP: B Wilson, Home runs: Aces: 1; B Harman; Heat: 0 Attendance:

==== 26 January 2008 at 7.30 pm, Baseball Park ====
Team	1	2	3	4	5	6	7	8	9	R	H	E
Victoria Aces	1	0	0	1	0	0	0	0	0	2	7	4
Perth Heat	1	0	0	0	0	0	1	3	X	5	7	2
Starting pitchers: Aces: T Blackley; Heat: S Mitchinson; WP: B Wise LP: A Bright; Home runs: Aces: 0 Heat: 1; M Kennelly Attendance:

==== 1 February 2008 at 7.00 pm, Melbourne Ballpark ====
Team	1	2	3	4	5	6	7	8	9	R	H	E
South Australia	1	0	1	0	0	0	2	0	1	5	8	0
Victoria Aces	0	1	3	0	1	2	0	2	X	9	11	2
Starting pitchers: SA: J Challinor; Aces: G Wiltshire; WP: G Wiltshire LP: J Challinor; Home runs: SA: 0 Aces: 0 Attendance:

==== 2 February 2008 at 3.00 pm, Melbourne Ballpark ====
Team	1	2	3	4	5	6	7	8	9	R	H	E
South Australia	4	2	3	0	0	3	0	0	2	14	22	4
Victoria Aces	2	0	0	0	1	6	0	1	1	11	10	1
Starting pitchers: SA: D Ruzic; Aces: B Wilson; WP: D Ruzic LP: B Wilson; Home runs: SA: 0 Aces: 0 Attendance:1,211

==== 2 February 2008 at 7.00 pm, Melbourne Ballpark ====
Team	1	2	3	4	5	6	7	R	H	E
South Australia	0	0	0	0	0	0	0	0	3	2
Victoria Aces	1	3	1	0	2	5	X	12	14	0
Starting pitchers: SA: T Langmann; Aces: T Blackley; WP: T Blackley LP: T Langmann; Home runs: SA: 0 Aces: 1; B Harman Attendance:1,437

=== Eastern Division ===
==== 28 December 2007 at 7.30 pm, Narrabundah ====
Team	1	2	3	4	5	6	7	8	9	R	H	E
NSW Patriots	0	0	1	0	5	1	0	1	0	8	11	1
Australia Provincial	0	0	1	0	0	0	0	0	0	1	13	1
Starting pitchers: Patriots: D Rosser; Provincial: P Brassington; WP: D Rosser (1-0) LP: L Wilkins (0-1); Home runs: Patriots: 0 Provincial: 0 Attendance:378

==== 29 December 2007 at 3.30 pm, Narrabundah ====
Team	1	2	3	4	5	6	7	8	9	R	H	E
NSW Patriots	0	1	3	1	1	0	0	0	0	6	13	1
Australia Provincial	0	0	0	0	0	0	2	0	0	2	6	1
Starting pitchers: Patriots: M Bennett; Provincial: C Hardy; WP: M Bennett (1-0) LP: C Hardy (0-1); Home runs: Patriots: 1, B Kingman; Provincial: 0 Attendance:

==== 29 December 2007 at 7.30 pm, Narrabundah ====
Team	1	2	3	4	5	6	7	8	9	R	H	E
NSW Patriots	0	0	0	1	1	1	0	1	1	5	11	0
Australia Provincial	0	1	0	0	0	0	0	0	0	1	5	1
Starting pitchers: Patriots: V Hardy; Provincial: S Kent; WP: T Cox (1-0) LP: S Kent (0-1); Home runs: Patriots: 0 Provincial: 0 Attendance:343

==== 6 January 2008 at 9.10 am, Holloway Field ====
Team	1	2	3	4	5	6	7	8	9	R	H	E
Australia Provincial	0	0	0	2	0	0	2	-	-	4	8	3
Queensland Rams	0	1	1	0	2	5	-	-	-	9	9	2
Starting pitchers: Provincial: P Brassington; Rams: C Mowday; WP: J Veitch (1-0) LP: C Hardy (0-2); Home runs: Provincial: 0 Rams: 1, J Naughton Attendance:350

==== 6 January 2008 at 12.00 pm, Holloway Field ====
No result, Game completed on 27 January on Provincial's home leg

Team	1	2	3	4	5	6	7	R	H	E
Australia Provincial	0	7	0	0	2	5	0	14	13	0
Queensland Rams	0	0	0	0	1	3	2	6	9	4
Starting pitchers: Provincial: S Kent; Rams: M Timms; WP: C Hardy (1-2) LP: M Timms (0-1); Home runs: Provincial: 0 Rams: 0 Attendance:

==== 5 January 2008 at 7.30 pm, Redlands ====
Rescheduled to 25 January 2008, Narrabundah

Team	1	2	3	4	5	6	7	R	H	E
Australia Provincial	0	1	0	0	0	0	2	3	5	3
Queensland Rams	0	0	0	0	4	3	X	7	8	2
Starting pitchers: Provincial: P Brassington; Rams: C Mowday; WP: C Mowday LP: P Brassington; Home runs: Provincial: 0 Rams: 0 Attendance:

==== 11 January 2008 at 7.30 pm, Blacktown Olympic Ballpark ====
Team	1	2	3	4	5	6	7	8	9	R	H	E
Australia Provincial	4	0	0	1	2	0	0	0	0	7	10	0
NSW Patriots	0	0	1	2	0	0	4	2	X	9	14	2
Starting pitchers: Provincial: P Brassington; Patriots: D Rosser; WP: T Cox (2-0) LP: D Thorne (0-1); Home runs: Provincial: 1, M Collins; Patriots: 1, G Fingleson Attendance:512

==== 12 January 2008 at 3.30 pm, Blacktown Olympic Ballpark ====
Team	1	2	3	4	5	6	7	8	9	R	H	E
Australia Provincial	0	1	2	0	0	0	0	0	0	3	10	2
NSW Patriots	0	5	0	0	2	0	2	0	X	9	11	1
Starting pitchers: Provincial: M Lennox; Patriots: M Bennett; WP: M Bennett (2-0) LP: M Lennox (0-1); Home runs: Provincial: 0 Patriots: 0 Attendance:296

==== 12 January 2008 at 7.30 pm, Blacktown Olympic Ballpark ====
Team	1	2	3	4	5	6	7	8	9	R	H	E
Australia Provincial	0	1	0	0	1	1	0	0	0	3	8	1
NSW Patriots	1	0	0	0	0	4	0	0	X	5	11	2
Starting pitchers: Provincial: S Kent; Patriots: T Grattan; WP: B Thomas (1-0) LP: R Hipke (0-1) Sv: M Williams (1); Home runs: Provincial: 0 Patriots: 0 Attendance:493

==== 19 January 2008 at 7.30 pm, Redlands ====
Team	1	2	3	4	5	6	7	8	9	R	H	E
NSW Patriots	0	2	0	0	0	0	0	3	0	5	7	0
Queensland Rams	0	1	0	2	0	0	1	0	0	4	10	2
Starting pitchers: Patriots: M Bennett; Rams: C Mowday; WP: T Cox LP: D Holland; Home runs: Patriots: 1; T D'Antonio; Rams: 1; M Studeman Attendance:600

==== 20 January 2008 at 3.30 pm, Redlands ====
Team	1	2	3	4	5	6	7	8	9	R	H	E
NSW Patriots	0	0	1	0	0	0	0	1	1	3	10	0
Queensland Rams	2	0	0	0	0	1	0	1	X	4	3	0
Starting pitchers: Patriots: J Eacott; Rams: T Crawford; WP: T Crawford (1-0) LP: J Eacott (0-1) Sv: P Stockman (1); Home runs: Patriots: 0 Rams: 1; B Roneberg Attendance:360

==== 20 January 2008 at 7.30 pm, Redlands ====
Team	1	2	3	4	5	6	7	8	9	R	H	E
NSW Patriots	0	3	0	1	0	0	0	0	0	4	5	0
Queensland Rams	0	2	1	1	0	0	0	1	X	5	9	0
Starting pitchers: Patriots: D Rosser; Rams: D Naylor; WP: S Morriss LP: A Cooke Sv: PJ Bevis; Home runs: Patriots: 2; P Maat; Rams: 1; B Roneberg, D Sutherland Attendance:352

==== 25 January 2008 at 7.30 pm, Narrabundah ====
Team	1	2	3	4	5	6	7	R	H	E
Queensland Rams	1	0	0	0	4	3	3	11	12	0
Australian Provincial	0	0	0	1	0	0	0	1	5	2
Starting pitchers: Rams: T Crawford; Provincial: S Kent; WP: T Crawford (2-0) LP: S Kent (0-2); Home runs: Rams: 0 Provincial: 0 Attendance:

==== 26 January 2008 at 3.30 pm, Narrabundah ====
Team	1	2	3	4	5	6	7	R	H	E
Queensland Rams	0	2	3	0	0	1	6	12	15	3
Australian Provincial	1	0	0	0	0	0	0	1	5	4
Starting pitchers: Rams: D Naylor; Provincial: M Lennox; WP: D Naylor (1-0) LP: M Lennox (0-2); Home runs: Rams: 0 Provincial: 0 Attendance:

==== 26 January 2008 at 7.30 pm, Narrabundah ====
Team	1	2	3	4	5	6	7	8	9	R	H	E
Queensland Rams	1	5	4	0	1	0	1	0	4	16	19	2
Australian Provincial	3	0	0	1	0	1	0	0	0	5	8	2
Starting pitchers: Rams: M Timms; Provincial: A Gribbin; WP: S Morriss (2-0) LP: A Gribbon (0-1); Home runs: Rams: 1; J Nilsson; Provincial: 0 Attendance:

==== 1 February 2008 at 7.30 pm, Blacktown Olympic Ballpark ====
Team	1	2	3	4	5	6	7	8	9	R	H	E
Queensland Rams	0	0	0	0	0	2	0	0	0	2	5	1
NSW Patriots	0	0	0	0	0	0	0	1	0	1	6	1
Starting pitchers: Rams: C Mowday; Patriots: M Bennett; WP: C Mowday (2-0) LP: M Bennett (2-1) Sv: PJ Bevis (1); Home runs: Rams: 0 Patriots: 0 Attendance:

==== 2 February 2008 at 3.30 pm, Blacktown Olympic Ballpark ====
Team	1	2	3	4	5	6	7	8	9	R	H	E
Queensland Rams	1	0	0	0	0	2	0	0	0	3	7	0
NSW Patriots	0	0	1	0	1	0	3	0	X	5	12	0
Starting pitchers: Rams: D Naylor; Patriots: T Cox; WP: M Williams (1-0) LP: S Morriss (2-1); Home runs: Rams: 0 Patriots: 0 Attendance:

==== 2 February 2008 at 7.30 pm, Blacktown Olympic Ballpark ====
Team	1	2	3	4	5	6	7	8	9	R	H	E
Queensland Rams	0	0	0	0	0	0	0	0	0	0	3	0
NSW Patriots	0	0	0	1	0	0	0	0	X	1	5	0
Starting pitchers: Rams: T Crawford; Patriots: S Benson; WP: D D'Louhy (1-0) LP: T Crawford (2-1) Sv: T Grattan (1); Home runs: Rams: 0 Patriots: 0 Attendance:728

== Ladder ==
=== Southern Division ===
Team	Played	Wins	Loss	Win %	Games Behind
Perth Heat	12	8	4	.667	
Victoria Aces	12	7	5	.583	1
South Australia	12	3	9	.250	5

=== Eastern Division ===
Team	Played	Wins	Loss	Win %	Games Behind
New South Wales Patriots	12	9	3	.750	
Queensland Rams	12	8	4	.667	1
Australian Provincial	12	1	11	.083	8

== Championship series ==
=== Game 1: 8 February 2008 at 7.30 pm, Blacktown Olympic Ballpark ===
Team	1	2	3	4	5	6	7	8	9	R	H	E
Perth Heat	2	0	0	1	2	0	0	0	0	5	9	0
NSW Patriots	0	0	0	0	2	0	0	0	1	3	7	3
Starting pitchers: Heat: L Hendriks; Patriots: M Bennett; WP: L Hendriks (1-0) LP: M Bennett (0-1) Sv: B Wise (1); Home runs: Heat: 1; L Hughes; Patriots: 0 Attendance:432

- Box Score

=== Game 2: 9 February 2008 at 7.30 pm, Blacktown Olympic Ballpark ===
Team	1	2	3	4	5	6	7	8	9	R	H	E
NSW Patriots	0	0	0	0	0	0	0	0	0	0	1	0
Perth Heat	1	0	0	0	0	0	3	0	X	4	6	1
Starting pitchers: Patriots: T Cox; Heat: M Kelly; WP: M Kelly (1-0) LP: T Cox (0-1); Home runs: Patriots: 0 Heat: 1; M. Graham Attendance:735

- Box Score

== Awards ==
Award	Name	Team
Most Valuable Player	Clint Balgera	Perth Heat
Championship M.V.P.	Mark Kelly	Perth Heat
Golden Glove	Matt Studeman	Queensland Rams
Batting Champion	Clint Balgera	Perth Heat
Pitcher of the Year	Tim Cox	New South Wales Patriots
Rookie of the Year	Liam Hendriks	Perth Heat
Manager of the Year	Gordon Gerlach	Perth Heat

== Top Stats ==
Defensive Stats
Name	Wins	Losses	Saves	ERA
Tim COX	3	0	0	1.00
Chris MOWDAY	2	0	0	1.17
Liam HENDRIKS	3	0	0	1.90
Tristian CRAWFORD	2	1	0	1.96
Darren FIDGE	0	0	1	2.19

Offensive Stars
Name	Avg	HR	RBI
Clint BALGERA	.450	1	11
David SUTHERLAND	.442	1	12
Brad HARMAN	.440	2	7
Mitch DENING	.409	0	4
Brett RONEBERG	.406	2	9

== All-Star Team ==
Position	Name	Team
Catcher		
1st Base		
2nd Base		
3rd Base		
Short Stop		
Out Field		
Out Field		
Out Field		
Designated Hitter		
Starting Pitcher		
Relief Pitcher		
Manager		
