= Australia Provincial =

Australian Provincial

Information
- League: IBLA (2002), Claxton Shield (2003–2008).
- Location: Australian Capital Territory
- Ballpark: None
- Founded: 2002
- Folded: 2008
- League championships: 0
- 2008: 1–11 (3rd east)
- Colours: Green and Yellow
- Manager: Damian Shanahan

Current uniforms
Home	Away

Australian Provincial compete in the Claxton Shield Baseball Championship in Australia. Provincial were formed for the 2002 International Baseball League of Australia Championship, since 2003 they have competed in the Claxton Shield.

In 2008, the Australian Baseball Federation announced Australia Provincial would not be competing in the 2009 Claxton Shield.

== History ==
Season	Finish
2002	6th
2003	6th
2004	5th
2005	5th
2006	5th
2007	5th
2008	3rd Eastern

== Last roster ==
This is Australia Provincial's last roster, a 22-man roster for the 2008 Claxton Shield, announced by Baseball Australia.

=== 2008 Claxton Shield squad ===
Surname	First	D.O.B.	Bats	Throws	Position
BRASSINGTON	Phil	19 April 1970	R	R	RHP
BROOKES	James	12 October 1988	S	R	SS
COLLINS	Michael	18 July 1984	R	R	C / 1B
DAVIES	Josh	12 September 1985	R	R	RHP
FIENEMANN	Mitchell	28 May 1990	R	R	RHP
GRIBBIN	Andrew	4 September 1988	R	R	RHP
GRIFFIN	Ryan	3 June 1989	L	L	LHP
HARDY	Cameron	5 April 1978	R	R	RHP
HIPKE	Ross	11 August 1986	R	R	RHP
KANDALIS	David	14 September 1990	R	R	OF
KENT	Steve	8 May 1989	L	L	LHP
LAWMAN	Matthew	26 June 1987	S	R	INF
LENNOX	Michael	25 August 1989	R	R	3B/RHP
McDONALD	Tristan	6 July 1979	R	R	C
McKENZIE	Andrew	28 March 1976	L	R	OF
NAYLOR	Clint	3 August 1988	L	R	C
PARKER	Josh	10 May 1988	R	R	INF
ROEGER	Angus	26 April 1990	R	R	OF
RYAN	Matthew	4 April 1986	L	L	LHP
SAUNDERSON	Mark	10 August 1979	R	R	1B / DH
VINCENT	Tom	3 March 1982	L	R	OF /DH
WILKINS	Luke	27 December 1989	R	R	RHP
