= Greg Jelks =

American baseball player (1961-2017)

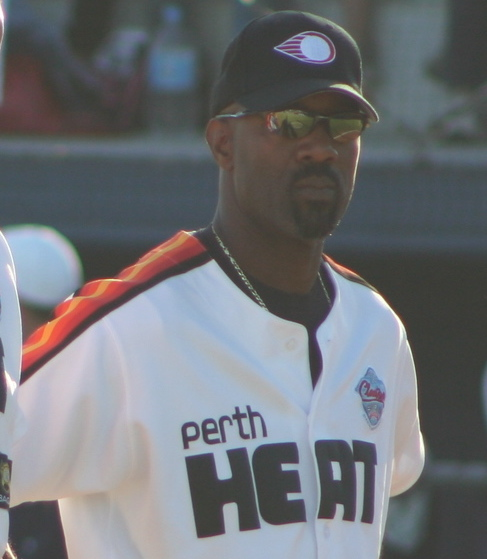
- Jelks with the Perth Heat in 2009
- Third baseman
- Born: 16 August 1961; Centre, Alabama, US
- Died: 6 January 2017 (aged 55); Sydney, Australia
- Batted: Right Threw: Right

MLB debut
- August 20, 1987, for the Philadelphia Phillies

Last MLB appearance
- October 3, 1987, for the Philadelphia Phillies

MLB statistics
- Batting average: .091
- On-base percentage: .286
- Hits: 1
- Stats at Baseball Reference

Teams
- Philadelphia Phillies (1987)
Medals
Men's baseball
Representing Australia
Intercontinental Cup
Bronze medal – third place	1997 Barcelona	Team

Gregory Dion Jelks (16 August 1961 – 6 January 2017) was an American-Australian baseball player who played with the Philadelphia Phillies. He spent the majority of his career in the minor leagues, and was most notable playing with the Australia national baseball team and the Perth Heat in the Australian Baseball League.

== Professional career ==
Born in Centre, Alabama, Jelks attended Cherokee County High School (Alabama), where he earned all-state honours in baseball and basketball. He attended Gadsden State Community College, where he played both sports for the Cardinals. Then he was signed as a non-drafted free agent by the Philadelphia Phillies in 1981. The following summer Jelks made his debut with the Bend Phillies of the Northwest League. The following year, Jelks hit 24 home runs and 75 RBI for the Spartanburg Spinners in A class ball of the South Atlantic League. In 1987, Jelks appeared in 123 AAA games for the Maine Guides and that summer, Jelks was promoted to Philadelphia for 10 games, where out of eleven at bats he collected one hit, a double off Montreal Expos pitcher Neal Heaton. Jelks became a free agent again in 1989 and was signed by the St. Louis Cardinals and played for the Louisville Redbirds. Over the course of eight minor league seasons, Jelks totaled 771 games, 96 home runs, 361 RBI, and a career batting average of.245.

During the 1990s, he played professionally in Italy and Australia. In 1993, he started his ABL career with the Perth Heat and Jelks enjoyed Australia, and decided to live in Perth, where he earned dual citizenship. Apart from a short stint with the Melbourne Reds in 1996, Jelks continued to play for the Heat throughout the ABL, as well as with Western Australia for the International Baseball League of Australia.

He then played with the Australian national team from 1997 to 2000. In the 1997 Intercontinental Cup, Jelks batted.471/.538/1.088 to help Australia win a bronze medal for the first time ever in a global event. He was second in average in the event behind Paul Gonzalez and tied Orestes Kindelán for the home run lead. Jelks was named on the All-Star team of the cup at designated hitter. The following year at the 1998 Baseball World Cup, he hit.278 as the starting left fielder for Australia and helped Australia to silver at the 1998 Haarlem Baseball Week. Jelks went on to play in the 1999 Intercontinental Cup and 2000 Sydney Olympics.

== Managerial career ==
Jelks began his professional managerial career in 2000 when he helped coach Australia at the 2000 Sydney Olympics and started head coaching in 2002 when he took the helm of the Evansville Otters of the independent Frontier League. In 2006, he was appointed to a coaching role for the national team at the 2006 World Baseball Classic.

Later that year, Greg led the Otters to a championship 2006. The following season, he was hired by the Frontier League as the manager of the fledgling expansion team the Slippery Rock Sliders. The Sliders were a concept team, building off a unique relationship with Slippery Rock University. Following a year of poor fan reception and a last place finish in the league, the Slippery Rock Sliders folded and the franchise became the Midwest Sliders, a travelling team in the league's Eastern Division. Greg Jelks was hired by the Washington Wild Things the following December, and began the 2008 season managing his third Frontier League franchise. Jelks was let go by the Wild Things after he did not lead them to the playoffs, and to a 48–48 record.

== Death ==
On a flight en route to Australia from the United States, Jelks fell asleep and could not be woken up, later being pronounced dead on January 6, 2017, aged 55. Jelks became the first (and only, as of 2024) MLB player in history to have died in Australia.
