= Cheng Chang-ming =

Taiwanese baseball player

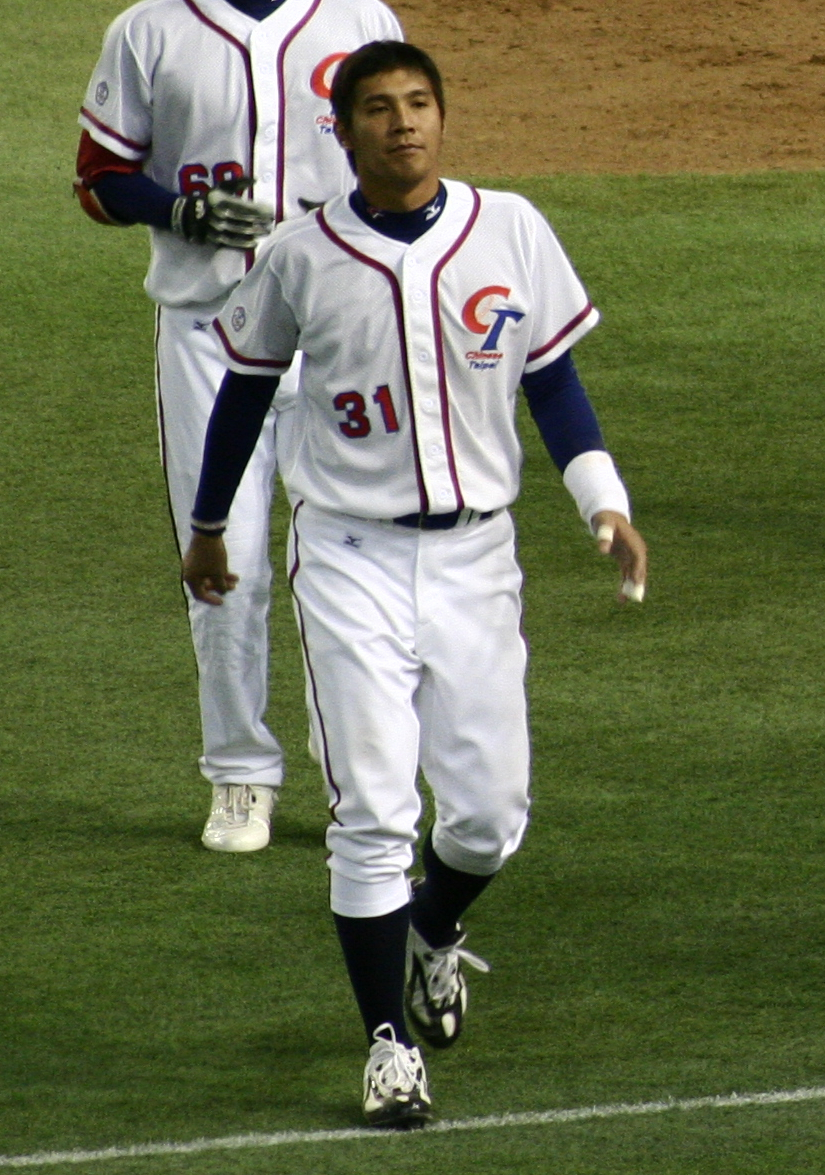
Cheng Chang-Ming

Cheng Chang-Ming (born 28 January 1978) is a Taiwanese baseball player who competed in the 2004 Summer Olympics.
