= Brandon Harper =

American baseball player (born 1976)

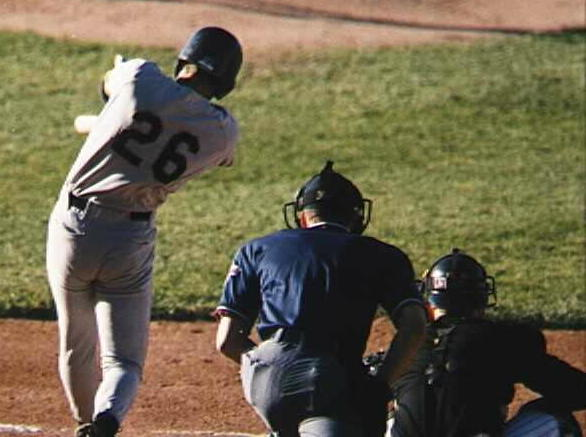
- Harper (left) with the Kane County Cougars in 1998
- Catcher
- Born: April 29, 1976 (age 49); Odessa, Texas, U.S.
- Batted: Right Threw: Right

MLB debut
- August 9, 2006, for the Washington Nationals

Last MLB appearance
- October 1, 2006, for the Washington Nationals

MLB statistics
- Batting average: .293
- Home runs: 2
- Runs batted in: 6
- Stats at Baseball Reference

Teams
- Washington Nationals (2006)

Brandon Scott Harper (born April 29, 1976) is an American former professional baseball catcher, who played in Major League Baseball (MLB) for the Washington Nationals. His entire big league career consists of 18 games played, in 2006.

== Personal life ==
Harper was born in Odessa, Texas on April 29, 1976. He went to high school in Hobbs, New Mexico. He attended Dallas Baptist University. He was the Florida Marlins' 4th round selection and 126th overall selection of the 1997 Major League Baseball draft.

He is not related to Phillies first baseman Bryce Harper, although he does have a younger brother named Bryce.

Harper now lives in Colorado with his wife and 3 kids Hope, Ellis, and Beck and works for Edward Jones.

== Career ==
Harper spent 11 years in the minor leagues, battling a number of injuries that kept him out of big-league action.

He played for both the Florida Marlins and Detroit Tigers minor league system. He made his debut with the Washington Nationals on August 9, 2006.

Both of Harper's home runs came on the same day, in an August 20 game against the Philadelphia Phillies.
