= 2007 Claxton Shield =

The 2007 Claxton Shield was the 73rd anniversary of the event, it was held between 19 and 28 January 2007, at Baseball Park in Western Australia, the first to be held outside of Blacktown Baseball Stadium in New South Wales since 2002 when it was held at the Melbourne Ballpark. The 2007 Shield featured over 120 of Australia's best baseballers, including 45 professionals.

== Teams ==
2007 Claxton Shield teams

The 2007 Claxton Shield is being competed between 6 teams from around Australia.

2007 Claxton Shield team rosters

- Australian Provincial,
- New South Wales Patriots,
- Perth Heat,
- Queensland Rams,
- South Australia,
- Victoria Aces.

== Match results ==
=== Game 1: 19 January 2007. ===
Team	1	2	3	4	5	6	7	8	9	R	H	E
Aus. Provincial	0	0	0	0	0	0	5	3	0	8	9	1
Perth Heat	1	0	0	0	0	0	2	1	2	6	8	2
WP: B. WILSON (1–0) LP: B. THOMAS (0–1) Sv: S. KENT; Home runs: Provincial: 0 Heat: 0 Attendance:1000

=== Game 2: 20 January 2007, at Hourglass Reserve, Rockingham. ===
Team	1	2	3	4	5	6	7	8	9	R	H	E
Queensland Rams	2	0	0	0	0	0	1	0	0	3	6	1
Australian Provincial	0	0	0	0	0	0	0	2	0	2	5	0
WP: J. VEITCH (1–0) LP: T. ELLIS (0–1) Sv: T. CRAWFORD; Home runs: Rams: 0 Provincial: 0 Attendance:200

=== Game 3: 20 January 2007. ===
Team	1	2	3	4	5	6	7	8	9	R	H	E
Victoria Aces	0	0	0	0	1	1	0	3	2	7	14	1
NSW Patriots	2	1	3	0	0	2	0	0	X	8	11	1
WP: A. COOK (1–0) LP: R. SPEAR (0–1) Sv: M. BENNETT; Home runs: Aces: 1 P. RUTGERS; Patriots: 3 G. FINGLESON, B. KINGMAN, A. GRAHAM Attendance:300

=== Game 4: 20 January 2007. ===
Team	1	2	3	4	5	6	7	8	9	R	H	E
Perth Heat	0	0	0	0	0	0	0	2	1	3	5	1
South Australia	0	0	2	0	1	0	0	1	X	4	9	0
WP: D. RUZIC (1–0) LP: M. KELLY (0–1) Sv: D. FIDGE; Home runs: Heat: 0 SA: 0 Attendance:1500

=== Game 5: 21 January 2007, at Merlin Reserve, Mandurah. ===
Team	1	2	3	4	5	6	7	8	9	10	11	R	H	E
Australian Provincial	0	0	0	0	0	1	3	0	0	0	1	5	7	2
South Australia	2	1	0	1	0	0	0	0	0	0	2	6	9	0
WP: C. LAWSON (1–0) LP: H. BEARD (0–1) Sv: None; Home runs: Provincial: 2 J. DAVIS, P. MAAT; SA: 0 Attendance:TBA

=== Game 6: 21 January 2007. ===
Team	1	2	3	4	5	6	7	8	9	R	H	E
Victoria Aces	0	1	0	2	1	0	2	4	0	10	11	0
Queensland	0	1	0	0	0	0	0	0	0	1	4	2
WP: G. WILTSHIRE (1–0) LP: M. BATES (0–1) Sv: None; Home runs: Aces: 2 D. SHUMPERT, P. WEICHARD; Rams: TBA Attendance:100

=== Game 7: 21 January 2007. ===
Team	1	2	3	4	5	6	7	8	9	10	R	H	E
NSW Patriots	0	0	0	0	0	0	0	0	0	1	1	6	1
Perth Heat	0	0	0	0	0	0	0	0	0	0	0	6	1
WP: R. THOMPSON (1–0) LP: D. WHITE (0–1) Sv: None; Home runs: Patriots: 0 Heat: 0 Attendance:1500

=== Game 8: 22 January 2007. ===
Team	1	2	3	4	5	6	7	8	9	R	H	E
South Australia	0	1	0	0	0	0	0	-	-	1	4	1
Queensland Rams	1	1	5	2	4	0	X	-	-	13	16	2
WP: T. LOETZSCH (1–0) LP: J. ZIERSCH (0–1) Sv: None; Home runs: SA: 0 Rams: 1 J. ROBERTS Attendance:100

=== Game 9: 22 January 2007. ===
Team	1	2	3	4	5	6	7	8	9	R	H	E
NSW Patriots	1	0	2	0	0	2	3	1	0	9	7	3
Australian Provincial	0	0	2	0	0	0	0	1	0	3	7	4
WP: V. HARRIS (1–0) LP: R. PAEWAI (0–1) Sv: None; Home runs: Patriots: 0 Provincial: 1 P. MAAT Attendance:100

=== Game 10: 22 January 2007. ===
Team	1	2	3	4	5	6	7	8	9	R	H	E
Perth Heat	0	0	0	0	0	1	0	0	0	1	4	1
Victoria Aces	1	0	0	0	0	0	1	1	X	3	7	1
WP: M. BLACKMORE (1–0) LP: S. EISSENS (0–1) Sv: P. MOYLAN; Home runs: Heat: 0 Aces: 1 M. KENT Attendance:1250

=== Game 11: 23 January 2007. ===
Team	1	2	3	4	5	6	7	8	9	R	H	E
South Australia	0	1	0	0	1	0	0	0	0	2	7	0
NSW Patriots	0	0	2	0	0	0	1	1	X	4	8	3
WP: A. BLIGHT (1–0) LP: D. FIDGE (0–1) Sv: C. ANDERSON; Home runs: SA: 1 T. WILLIAMS; Patriots: 0 Attendance:57

=== Game 12: 23 January 2007. ===
Team	1	2	3	4	5	6	7	8	9	R	H	E
Aus. Provincial	0	3	1	0	0	5	0	0	0	9	12	1
Victoria Aces	2	0	0	0	0	0	0	2	0	4	7	4
WP: B. WILSON (1–0) LP: C. FORBES (0–1) Sv: None; Home runs: Provincial: 2 M. COLLINS, P. MAAT; Aces: 0 Attendance:100

=== Game 13: 23 January 2007. ===
Team	1	2	3	4	5	6	7	8	9	R	H	E
Queensland Rams	0	0	3	2	1	0	0	0	0	6	11	0
Perth Heat	0	0	0	0	0	0	0	0	0	0	1	2
WP: C. MOWDAY (1–0) LP: L. BARON (0–1) Sv: None; Home runs: Rams: 0 Heat: 0 Attendance:1000

=== Game 14: 24 January 2007. ===
Team	1	2	3	4	5	6	7	8	9	R	H	E
Victoria Aces	1	5	0	1	0	0	2	1	0	10	11	0
South Australia	0	0	4	0	0	0	0	0	0	4	6	1
WP: D. HENDRICKS (1–0) LP: D. REDDEN (0–1) Sv: None; Home runs: Aces: 1 B. HARMAN; SA: 1 B. WIGMORE Attendance:100

=== Game 15: 24 January 2007. ===
Team	1	2	3	4	5	6	7	8	9	R	H	E
NSW Patriots	1	1	6	0	1	0	0	0	0	9	12	1
Queensland Rams	0	0	0	1	0	0	2	0	0	3	9	2
WP: A. FRANCIS (1–0) LP: M. BATES (0–1) Sv: None; Home runs: Patriots: 1 M. LYSAUGHT; Rams: 0 Attendance:180

== Ladder – After Round Robin ==
Team	Played	Wins	Loss	Win %	For	Agn.
New South Wales Patriots	5	5	0	1.000	31	18
Victoria Aces	5	3	2	.600	34	23
Queensland Rams	5	3	2	.600	26	22
South Australia	5	2	3	.400	19	35
Australian Provincial	5	2	3	.400	30	28
Perth Heat	5	0	5	.000	10	22

== Championship series ==
=== Game 16: 25 January 2007 – Minor Semi Final (3rd vs 4th) ===
Team	1	2	3	4	5	6	7	8	9	R	H	E
South Australia	0	0	1	0	4	0	0	0	0	5	9	0
Queensland Rams	0	0	0	0	0	0	0	0	0	0	3	1
WP: D. RUZIC (1–0) LP: J. VEITCH (0–1) Sv: None; Home runs: SA: 0 Rams: 0 Attendance:57

=== Game 17: 25 January 2007 – Major Semi Final (1st vs 2nd) ===
Team	1	2	3	4	5	6	7	8	9	R	H	E
Victoria Aces	1	0	1	0	0	0	0	2	2	6	12	2
NSW Patriots	0	2	0	1	0	0	0	0	0	3	8	2
WP: M. BLACKMORE (1–0) LP: M. WILLIAMS (0–1) Sv: P. MOYLAN; Home runs: Aces: 0 Patriots: 0 Attendance:204

=== Game 18: 26 January 2007 – Preliminary Final – Loser Game 17 Vs Winner Game 16 ===
Team	1	2	3	4	5	6	7	8	9	R	H	E
South Australia	0	1	0	1	0	0	0	0	0	2	6	1
NSW Patriots	0	0	1	0	0	0	0	0	2	3	3	0
WP: M. BENNETT (1–0) LP: P. MILDREN (0–1) Sv: None; Home runs: SA: 0 Patriots: 0 Attendance:150

=== Game 19: 27 January 2007 – Grand Final – Winner Game 17 Vs Winner Game 18 ===
Team	1	2	3	4	5	6	7	8	9	R	H	E
NSW Patriots	0	1	1	0	0	1	0	0	0	3	8	2
Victoria Aces	0	1	0	0	0	1	1	0	1	4	8	2
WP: A. BLACKLEY (1–0) LP: A. COOK (0–1) Sv: None; Home runs: Patriots: 0 Aces: 2 M. KENT, B. UTTING. Attendance:1,500

Box score

New South Wales Patriots

Hitters	AB	R	H	RBI	BB	SO	LOB	AVG
Trent OELTJEN LF	5	0	0	0	0	2	0	.000
Timothy AUTY RF	5	0	0	0	0	4	2	.000
Gavin FINGLESON 2B	4	1	3	0	0	0	0	.750
Glenn WILLIAMS SS	3	1	1	0	1	1	1	.333
Brendan KINGMAN 1B	4	1	2	1	0	1	0	.500
Trent D'ANTONIO DH	3	0	0	0	0	0	3	.000
Mark HOLLAND 3B	4	0	0	0	0	0	0	.000
Andrew GRAHAM C	4	0	2	1	0	1	1	.500
Michael LYSAUGHT CF	3	0	0	0	1	2	1	.000
Totals	35	3	8	2	2	12	8
BATTING; Hits: 8; G. FINGLESON 3, B. KINGMAN 2, A. GRAHAM 2, G. WILLIAMS. 2B: 1; B. KINGMAN. RBI: 2; B. KINGMAN, A. GRAHAM. 2-out RBI: Runners left in scoring position, 2 out:
BASERUNNING; SB: 0.
FIELDING; E: G. WILLIAMS 2. DP:

New South Wales Patriots

Pitchers	IP	H	R	ER	BB	SO	HR	ERA
Harris VAUGHAN	4.2	3	1	0	2	4	0	X.XX
Todd GRATTAN	2.1	2	2	2	0	3	2	X.XX
Matthew WILLIAMS	1.2	2	1	1	0	1	0	X.XX
Andrew COOK	0.0	1	0	0	0	0	0	X.XX
Totals	8.2	8	4	3	2	8	2
PITCHING; Batters faced: H. VAUGHAN 20, T. GRATTAN 9, M. WILLIAMS 8, A. COOK 1. Ground Outs-Fly Outs: H. VAUGHAN 5–5, T. GRATTAN 3–1, M. WILLIAMS 3–1, A. COOK 0–0.

Victoria Aces

Hitters	AB	R	H	RBI	BB	SO	LOB	AVG
Paul WEICHARD CF	5	0	0	0	0	1	0	.000
Paul RUTGERS 2B	4	0	1	1	1	0	0	.250
Brad HARMAN SS	4	0	1	0	0	0	1	.250
Matthew KENT C	3	2	2	1	1	0	0	.666
Danile BERG 1B	4	0	1	0	0	3	2	.250
Rikki JOHNSTON DH	3	0	0	0	0	0	1	.000
Derek SHUMPERT LF	2	0	0	0	0	1	0	.000
Ryan BOOTH PH/LF	2	0	1	0	0	1	0	.500
Andrew RUSSELL RF	4	1	0	0	0	1	0	.000
Ben UTTING 3B	4	1	2	1	0	1	2	.500
Totals	35	4	8	3	2	8	8
BATTING; Hits: 8; M. KENT 2, B. UTTING 2, P. RUTGERS, B. HARMAN, D. BERG, R. BOOTH. 2B: 1; B. HARMAN. HR: 2; M. KENT, B. UTTING. RBI: 3; P. RUTGERS, M. KENT, B. UTTING. 2-out RBI: Runners left in scoring position, 2 out:
BASERUNNING; SB: 0.
FIELDING; E: 2; A. RUSSELL, G. WILTSHIRE. DP:

Victoria Aces

Pitchers	IP	H	R	ER	BB	SO	HR	ERA
Greg WILTSHIRE	7.2	7	3	2	1	11	1	X.XX
Adam BLACKLEY	1.1	1	0	0	1	1	1	X.XX
Totals	9.0	8	3	2	2	12	1
PITCHING; Batters Faced: G. WILTSHIRE 32, A. BLACKLEY 6. Ground Outs-Fly Outs: G. WILTSHIRE 9–3, A. BLACKLEY 1–2.

Game Information

Stadium: Baseball Park, Thornlie, Perth, Australia
Date: 27 January 2007.
Attendance: 1,500 (37.5% Capacity)
Start Time: 7:00pm
Game Time: 2:45
Umpires: Home – Brett ROBSON, First Base – Paul HYHAM, Second Base – Travis HATCH, Third Base – Blake HALLIGAN

== Awards ==
Award	Person	Team
Most Valuable Player	Matthew KENT	Victoria Aces
Championship M.V.P.	Greg WILTSHIRE	Victoria Aces
Golden GLOVE	Paul RUTGERS	Victoria Aces
Batting Champion	Matthew KENT	Victoria Aces
Pitcher of the Year	Dushan RUSIC	South Australia
Rookie of the Year	David ROSSER	New South Wales Patriots
Manager of the Year		

== Top Stats ==
Defensive Stats
Name	Wins	Losses	Saves	ERA
Dushan RUZIC	2	0	0	0.00
Greg WILTSHIRE	1	0	0	1.84
David ROSSER	0	0	0	1.29
Taj MERRILL	0	0	0	3.46
John VEITCH	1	1	0	2.19

Offensive Stars
Name	Avg	HR	RBI
Marc TAINTY	.417	0	2
Mathew KENT	.379	1	6
Glenn WILLIAMS	.379	0	4
Gavin FINGLESON	.370	1	6
Ben UTTING	.364	1	6

== All-Star Team ==
Position	Name	Team
Catcher		
1st Base		
2nd Base		
3rd Base		
Short Stop		
Out Field		
Out Field		
Out Field		
Designated Hitter		
Starting Pitcher		
Relief Pitcher		
Manager		
