= Ryan Langerhans =

American baseball player (born 1980)

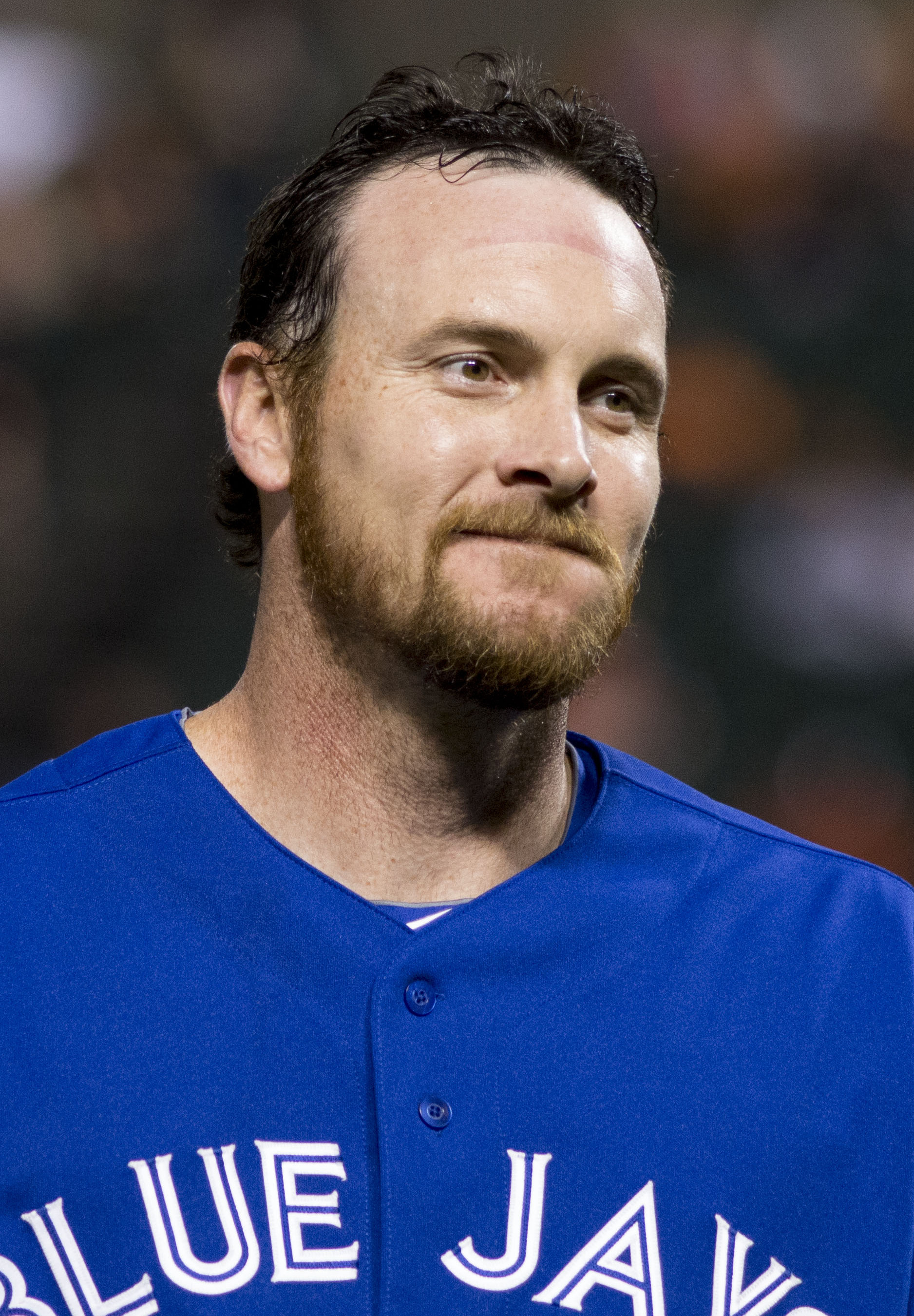
- Langerhans with the Toronto Blue Jays in 2013
- Outfielder
- Born: February 20, 1980 (age 46); San Antonio, Texas, U.S.
- Batted: Left Threw: Left

MLB debut
- April 28, 2002, for the Atlanta Braves

Last MLB appearance
- September 29, 2013, for the Toronto Blue Jays

MLB statistics
- Batting average: .226
- Home runs: 33
- Runs batted in: 125
- Stats at Baseball Reference

Teams
- Atlanta Braves (2002–2003, 2005–2007); Oakland Athletics (2007); Washington Nationals (2007–2008); Seattle Mariners (2009–2011); Los Angeles Angels of Anaheim (2012); Toronto Blue Jays (2013)

Ryan David Langerhans (born February 20, 1980) is an American former professional baseball outfielder. He was drafted in the third round of the 1998 MLB draft by the Atlanta Braves, and made his debut with them in 2002. Langerhans also played in Major League Baseball (MLB) for the Oakland Athletics, Washington Nationals, Seattle Mariners, Los Angeles Angels of Anaheim, and Toronto Blue Jays.

== Amateur career ==
Langerhans attended Round Rock High School in Round Rock, Texas. During the 1996 season, Langerhans batted .442 and was selected to the All-State team. His next season, 1997, Langerhans batted .427 and was again selected to the All-State team. That season, Langerhans also won 11 games as a pitcher for the state champion Dragons. During his senior season in 1998, Langerhans batted .512, was named to the All-State team, was selected as a Nike All-American, was selected to play in the 1998 Texas High School All-Star Game, and was named Texas Player of the Year. Langerhans is one of six players who attended Round Rock High School and have played in the major leagues. Langerhans's father, John, was his coach while playing for the Round Rock baseball team. During his senior year, Langerhans signed a letter of intent with the University of Texas, however, after being drafted by the Atlanta Braves, Langerhans went straight to professional baseball.

== Professional career ==
=== Atlanta Braves ===
==== Early minor league career ====
Langerhans made his professional debut in 1998 with the rookie-level GCL Braves of the Gulf Coast League. He batted .277 with 41 hits, 10 doubles, 4 triples, 2 home runs, and 19 RBIs. In 1999, Langerhans was promoted to the Class-A Macon Braves of the South Atlantic League. In 121 games, Langerhans batted .268 with 120 hits, 30 doubles, 1 triple, 9 home runs, 49 RBIs, and 19 stolen bases. In 2000, Langerhans was assigned to the Class-A Advanced Myrtle Beach Pelicans of the Carolina League. He appeared in 116 games with the Pelicans and batted .212 with 14 doubles, 7 triples, 6 home runs, 37 RBIs, and 25 stolen bases. Langerhans's 7 triples was tied for third most in the league with Choo Freeman (7), was and behind Damione Merriman (9), and Chone Figgins (14). Langerhans continued playing with the Class-A Advanced Myrtle Beach Pelicans in 2001. He batted .287 with 30 doubles, 3 triples, 7 home runs, 48 RBIs, and 22 stolen bases. In 2002, Langerhans was promoted to the Double-A Greenville Braves of the Southern League. He batted .251 with 23 doubles, 2 triples, 9 home runs, and 62 RBIs in 109 games.

==== Major league beginning ====
Langerhans was called up to the Atlanta Braves from the Double-A Greenville Braves in April 2002. He appeared in one game that season where he had one at-bat against the Houston Astros where he did not record a hit. He was sent back down to the minors to start the 2003 season where he batted a combined .261 with 33 doubles, 4 triples, 10 home runs, and 49 RBIs between the Double-A Greenville Braves and the Triple-A Richmond Braves. Langerhans was called up by the Braves in September. On September 5, in his second game of the season, Langerhans got his first major league hit coming against the Pittsburgh Pirates.

Despite making his major league debut in 2002, Langerhans did not become an everyday big-league player until 2005, getting playing time for the Braves in all three outfield positions. He is part of the group of 18 rookie players nicknamed the "Baby Braves" that Atlanta called up from its minor league system during the 2005 season.

Langerhans started 2006 as the Braves regular left fielder but a severe drop-off in his production from 2005 combined with the hot hitting of Matt Diaz resulted in a drop in Langerhans's playing time. By the end of the 2006 season, he was a platoon left-fielder, with Diaz as his right-handed partner. Scott Thorman often also took starts from Langerhans as the left-handed part of the left-field platoon.

=== Oakland Athletics ===
After a poor start to 2007 at the plate, he was traded on April 29 to the Oakland Athletics for a player to be named later. He played just two games for the A's, going a combined 0-for-4 with a walk and an error.

=== Washington Nationals ===
On May 2, 2007, he was traded to the Washington Nationals for Chris Snelling.

=== Seattle Mariners ===
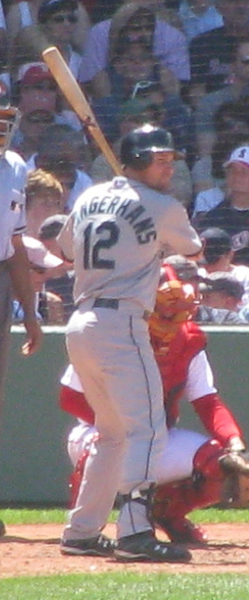
Langerhans batting for the Seattle Mariners in 2009

On June 28, 2009 he was traded to the Seattle Mariners for utility player Mike Morse. With the Mariners, Langerhans had better results hitting curve balls and sliders than fastballs and changeups, causing some speculation that this skill set could be responsible for his tendency to play in a part-time role.

He was non-tendered at the deadline to offer arbitration on December 12, 2009. On December 18, however, the Mariners re-signed Langerhans to a minor league contract.

On April 7, Langerhans was designated for assignment to make room for Jesús Colomé.

On December 14, 2010, the Mariners again re-signed Langerhans to a minor league contract.

On May 9, 2011, Langerhans was again designated for assignment to make room for Mike Wilson.

=== Arizona Diamondbacks ===
On July 29, 2011, Langerhans was traded to the Arizona Diamondbacks for cash considerations.

=== Los Angeles Angels of Anaheim ===
Langerhans signed a minor league contract with the Los Angeles Angels of Anaheim on December 23, 2011. Ryan was recalled by the Angels on May 14, 2012, when Torii Hunter was placed on the restricted list. On May 20, Langerhans was removed from a game against the Padres when he injured his right shoulder after crashing into the left-field wall at San Diego's Petco Park. After coming off the 15-day disabled list, Langerhans was outrighted by the Angels. On October 6, 2012, Langerhans elected free agency.

=== Toronto Blue Jays/Sugar Land Skeeters ===
On December 18, 2012, the Toronto Blue Jays announced that Langerhans had been signed to a minor league contract with an invitation to major league spring training. Langerhans played for the Triple-A Buffalo Bisons during the 2013 season until he was released on June 21. After leaving the Bisons, Langerhans played for the Sugar Land Skeeters of the independent Atlantic League. In 47 games he hit .287/.420/.500 with 5 home runs, 28 RBI, and 4 stolen bases. Langerhans was signed to a minor league contract and assigned to the Buffalo Bisons again on August 22, 2013. When the Bisons season ended, Langerhans asked for and received his release, and returned to the Skeeters for their playoff run. On September 26, Langerhans again signed with the Blue Jays, this time a major league contract, as the Blue Jays were short on position players. He became a free agent on October 8.

Langerhans returned to the Sugar Land Skeeters for the 2014 season. In 123 games he hit .279/.407/.449 with 13 home runs, 56 RBI, and six stolen bases.

== Notable moments ==
Langerhans hit a game-winning home run against J.P. Howell on August 7, 2009, with two outs in the bottom of the 11th inning. This was his first career game-winning homer.

On August 25, 2009, Langerhans hit another game-winning home run against the Oakland Athletics off Craig Breslow on a two-ball two-strike pitch with one out and one runner on with the score tied, 2–2, in the bottom of the tenth.

== Personal life ==
Langerhans and his wife, Shari, live in Round Rock, Texas, where he also graduated from high school. In high school Langerhans improved his baseball skills and participated in cross country. Langerhans won a Class 5A state championship with the Round Rock High School Dragons in 1997.

Langerhans' high school baseball team was coached by his father, John, a former standout baseball player for the University of Texas, where Ryan was signed to play before signing a professional contract. His father, who also won a state baseball tournament, was a minor league first baseman.

Ryan hit a high school tournament-record three triples in the state tournament semi-final against Moody High School before earning the win as the pitcher in the championship game against traditional Texas powerhouse Lubbock Monterey, who was coached by Bobby Moegle, the winningest coach in United States high school baseball history.

After leaving baseball, Langerhans earned a real estate license.
