= Chris Snelling =

American baseball player (born 1981)

- Outfielder
- Born: December 3, 1981 (age 44); North Miami, Florida, U.S.
- Batted: Left Threw: Left

MLB debut
- May 25, 2002, for the Seattle Mariners

Last MLB appearance
- June 6, 2008, for the Philadelphia Phillies

MLB statistics
- Batting average: .244
- Home runs: 7
- Runs batted in: 20
- Stats at Baseball Reference

Teams
- Seattle Mariners (2002, 2005–2006); Washington Nationals (2007); Oakland Athletics (2007); Philadelphia Phillies (2008)

Christopher Doyle Snelling (born December 3, 1981) is an American-born Australian former Major League Baseball outfielder.

== Career ==
=== Seattle Mariners ===
Snelling was signed as an amateur free agent out of Australia by the Seattle Mariners on March 2, 1999. He quickly established himself as the franchise's top position prospect in the system. He was often compared to Lenny Dykstra due to his aggressive play and ability to hit for average and draw walks. He made it to the major leagues in 2002, but during a baserunning mishap tore his ACL in his left knee. After that incident, his status as a top prospect began to decline, as Snelling suffered numerous serious injuries in subsequent years. At Seattle Mariners fan blog USS Mariner, Snelling was dubbed "Doyle" (his middle name) in hopes of driving off the injury curse that plagued him.

=== Washington Nationals ===
On the night of December 13, 2006, The Washington Post reported that Snelling and Mariners pitching prospect Emiliano Fruto would be traded to the Washington Nationals for veteran second baseman José Vidro. The trade was completed several days later.

Following the Virginia Tech massacre, players for the Nationals wore Virginia Tech baseball caps for their game against the Atlanta Braves on April 17, 2007. Snelling's cap was then sent to the Hall of Fame in Cooperstown, New York.

On the evening of May 2, 2007, during a game between the Nationals and San Diego Padres, Snelling was traded to the Oakland Athletics for outfielder Ryan Langerhans.

=== Tampa Bay Devil Rays ===
Snelling was claimed off waivers from the Athletics by the Tampa Bay Devil Rays on October 25, 2007.

=== Philadelphia Phillies ===
With a crowded outfield, the Rays traded Snelling to the Philadelphia Phillies for cash considerations on November 20, 2007. The Phillies sent him outright to the minors on March 28, 2008.

On April 12, 2008, Snelling was recalled from the minor leagues by the Phillies after an injury to Shane Victorino. Despite getting only 4 AB, he had two very key hits for the Phillies who won the division by just three games. On April 15, he hit a pinch hit, first pitch HR off Houston Astros closer José Valverde in the 9th inning with his team down three runs. The Phillies scored three more runs in the inning and won the game. On June 6, he hit a pinch hit double to lead off the top of the 10th inning against the Atlanta Braves. The Phillies scored two runs in the inning and won the game.

He was designated for assignment on June 7. He spent most of the season with the Phillies' Triple-A affiliate, the Lehigh Valley IronPigs.

=== San Diego Padres ===
Snelling signed a minor league deal with San Diego Padres on March 14, 2009.

=== Pittsburgh Pirates ===
On June 10, 2009, Snelling was traded to the Pittsburgh Pirates for future considerations, but was released after Ryan Doumit was activated.

=== Sultanes de Monterrey ===
On April 8, 2009, Snelling signed with the Sultanes de Monterrey of the Mexican League. He was released on June 9. In 49 games he hit .324/.435/.520 with 5 home runs and 29 RBIs.

== International career ==
Although he was born in the United States, Snelling grew up in Australia and has played for the Australian national team.

He selected at the 2009 World Baseball Classic, 2009 Baseball World Cup and 2013 World Baseball Classic.

At the 2009 World Baseball Classic, he hit two of Australia's four home runs in its victory over Mexico on March 8, 2009.

Preceded by Incumbent	International Baseball League of Australia MVP; 1999–2000	Succeeded by
