= Brad Voyles =

American baseball player (born 1976)

- Pitcher
- Born: December 30, 1976 (age 49); Green Bay, Wisconsin, U.S.
- Batted: Right Threw: Right

Professional debut
- MLB: September 8, 2001, for the Kansas City Royals
- NPB: July 3, 2004, for the Fukuoka Daiei Hawks

Last appearance
- MLB: September 27, 2003, for the Kansas City Royals
- NPB: August 31, 2004, for the Fukuoka Daiei Hawks

MLB statistics
- Win–loss record: 0–4
- Earned run average: 6.59
- Strikeouts: 56

NPB statistics
- Win–loss record: 0–1
- Earned run average: 24.30
- Strikeouts: 2
- Stats at Baseball Reference

Teams
- Kansas City Royals (2001–2003); Fukuoka Daiei Hawks (2004)

Bradley Roy Voyles (born December 30, 1976) is an American former professional baseball pitcher who played for three seasons. He pitched in 40 games for the Kansas City Royals from 2001 to 2003.

Voyles attended Luxemburg-Casco High School in Luxemburg, Wisconsin. He did not pitch for the school's baseball team after his sophomore year because, according to Voyles, he had too little command of his pitches. He entered the workforce after high school and did not plan to attend college until he received a scholarship offer from a Kishwaukee College coach who had only heard of Voyles' performance at a baseball camp. After two years at Kishwaukee, he continued his college baseball career at Lincoln Memorial University. Despite posting an earned run average of 5.06 in 1998, he was selected in that year's Major League Baseball draft in the 45th round by the Atlanta Braves.

Voyles remained in the Braves organization until 2001. In spring training of that year, he broke his ankle and was kept off the field until June. At the trade deadline, with the Braves having lost Rafael Furcal and in need of a shortstop for their playoff push, Voyles was traded along with Alejandro Machado to the Kansas City Royals in exchange for Rey Sanchez. Voyles made his Major League debut later that season, allowing only a base on balls in a ninth-inning relief appearance against the Texas Rangers.
