= Travis Wilson (softball) =

New Zealand softball player

Florida State Seminoles
- Second baseman / Coach
- Born: July 10, 1977 (age 49); Christchurch, New Zealand
- Bats: Right Throws: Right
- Stats at Baseball Reference

Travis David Wilson (born 10 July 1977) was a former member of the Black Sox, New Zealand's national softball team. He first played for the Black Sox in 1994 and was an integral part of their ISF Men's World Championship winning team in Midland, Michigan in 1996. Wilson was hited as a hitting coach for the Florida State Seminoles softball team in 2012. The Florida State softball team has won eight ACC titles and has made five trips to the Women's College World Series (2014, 2016, 2018, 2021, 2023) in his time. Florida State has played in three championship series in 2018, 2021, 2023. They were the 2018 National Champions.

Wilson was scouted by the Atlanta Braves where he played for seven seasons, most of which were spent at the Triple-A level. He was a multiple Minor League All-Star and was put on the Braves 40-man roster after leading the Arizona Fall League in hitting in 2001. Wilson finished his baseball career in 2004 with a season in the Cincinnati Reds farm system.

From 2002 through 2004, Wilson also played three seasons of winter ball for the Tiburones de La Guaira and Leones del Caracas clubs of the Venezuelan Professional Baseball League.

In 2005 Wilson returned to New Zealand where he worked for three years with the New Zealand national cricket team as their Specialist Fielding Coach and Video Analyst.

In 2022, Wilson was inducted into the International Softball Congress Hall of Fame.
