= 2006 Claxton Shield =

Australian baseball competition results

2006 Claxton Shield teams

Results and statistics for the 2006 Claxton Shield

== Results ==
=== Round 1: Saturday, 21 January 2006 ===
Round 1
Australian Provincial	8	def. by	Queensland	10
South Australia	3	def. by	Western Australia	6
New South Wales	8	def. by	Victoria	10

=== Round 2: Sunday, 22 January 2006 ===
Round 2
South Australia	5	def. by	Australian Provincial	6
Victoria	5	def. by	Queensland	8
Western Australia	6	def. by	New South Wales	8

=== Round 3: Monday, 23 January 2006 ===
Round 3
Victoria	3	def. by	South Australia	6
Australian Provincial	10	def. by	Western Australia	16
Queensland	5	def.	New South Wales	2

=== Round 4: Tuesday, 24 January 2006 ===
Round 4
Western Australia	5	def. by	Victoria	6
Queensland	9	def.	South Australia	5
Australian Provincial	6	def.	New South Wales	5

=== Round 5: Wednesday, 25 January 2006 ===
Round 5
Queensland	8	def.	Western Australia	7
Victoria	11	def.	Australian Provincials	6
New South Wales	9	def.	South Australia	0

== Final standings ==
Team	Played	Wins	Loss	Drawn	Win %	Runs For	Runs Against
Queensland Rams	5	5	0	0	100%	40	27
Victorian Aces	5	3	2	0	60%	35	33
New South Wales	5	2	3	0	40%	32	27
Western Australia	5	2	3	0	40%	40	35
Australian Provincial	5	2	3	0	40%	35	47
South Australia	5	1	4	0	20%	19	33

== Finals ==
=== Semi-finals ===
Semi-finals
Queensland	2	def.	Western Australia	0
Victoria	3	def.	New South Wales	2

=== Grand final ===
Grand Final
Queensland	8	def.	Victoria	7
