= Justin Huber =

Australian baseball player (born 1982)

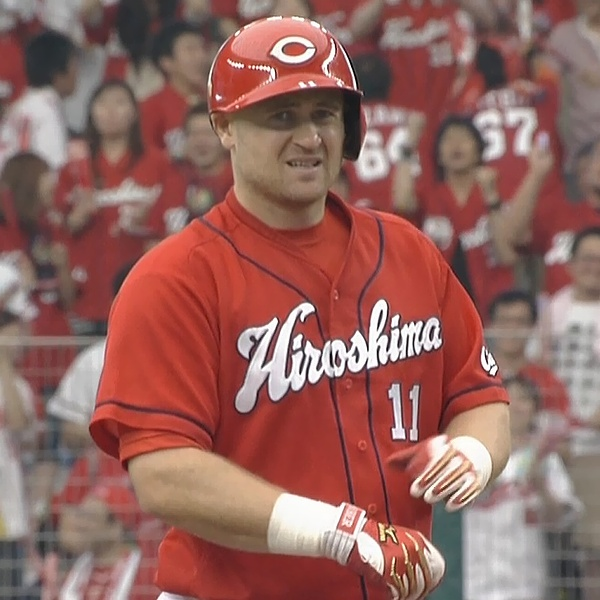
- Huber with the Hiroshima Toyo Carp in 2010
- First baseman
- Born: 1 July 1982 (age 43); Melbourne, Australia
- Batted: Right Threw: Right

Professional debut
- MLB: 21 June, 2005, for the Kansas City Royals
- NPB: March 26, 2010, for the Hiroshima Toyo Carp

Last appearance
- MLB: September 11, 2009, for the Minnesota Twins
- NPB: October 7, 2010, for the Hiroshima Toyo Carp

MLB statistics
- Batting average: .224
- Home runs: 2
- Runs batted in: 15

NPB statistics
- Batting average: .220
- Home runs: 7
- Runs batted in: 17
- Stats at Baseball Reference

Teams
- Kansas City Royals (2005–2007); San Diego Padres (2008); Minnesota Twins (2009); Hiroshima Toyo Carp (2010)

Member of the Australian

Baseball Hall of Fame
- Induction: 2021

Justin Patrick Huber (/ˈhjuːbər/; born 1 July 1982) is an Australian former professional baseball player. A first baseman and outfielder, Huber has played in Major League Baseball, Nippon Professional Baseball, and the Australian Baseball League. He has also played for the Australian national baseball team in international competitions.

== Career ==
=== New York Mets ===
Huber attended Beaconhills College and was signed as an international free agent as a catcher by the New York Mets in 2000.

=== Kansas City Royals ===
Huber was one of the top prospects within the Mets organisation when he was traded to the Kansas City Royals before the 2004 trade deadline for José Bautista. Huber underwent surgery to repair torn cartilage in his left knee in August, ending his season.

This injury ended Huber's catching career, and by the time he made his major league debut on 21 June 2005, he was a first baseman. He made his first career appearance in the outfield on 17 September 2007 against the Chicago White Sox.

=== San Diego Padres ===
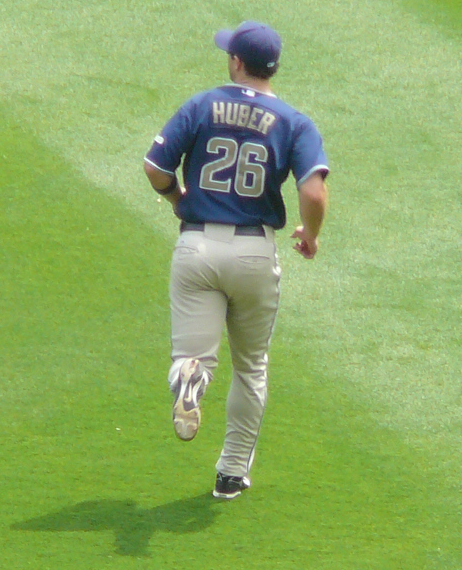
Huber with the Padres in 2008

On 26 March 2008, Huber was traded to the San Diego Padres for a player to be named later. He hit his first career home run on 20 April 2008, against Randy Johnson of the Arizona Diamondbacks. He became a free agent at the end of the season.

=== Minnesota Twins ===
Huber signed a minor league contract with the Minnesota Twins in February 2009, and he received a September callup when the rosters expanded.

He was released at the end of the season and signed with the Hiroshima Carp for 40 million yen with 5.5 million in bonuses.

On 19 November 2010, while playing for the Melbourne Aces in the Australian Baseball League, he was re-signed by the Twins to a minor league contract. After a poor spring, he was released by the Twins to make room for Scott Diamond.

He signed with the Somerset Patriots of the Atlantic League of Professional Baseball for the 2011 season.
