= Palm Meadows =

Baseball field in Gold Coast, Queensland

Palm Meadows International Baseball Facility
- Palm Meadows
- Interactive map of Palm Meadows International Baseball Facility
- Location: Palm Meadows Drive, Carrara, Queensland
- Coordinates: 28.028512°S 153.373384°E
- Owner: Hungtat Worldwide Pty Ltd
- Capacity: 2,500
- Surface: Grass
- Field size: Left Field - 335 feet (102 m); Center Field - 390 feet (120 m); Right Field - 328 feet (100 m)

Tenants
- Australia national baseball team MLBAAP

Palm Meadows International Baseball Facility is an Australian baseball field located on the Gold Coast, Queensland. It is owned by Hungtat Worldwide Pty Ltd (Trading as Palm Meadows Golf course) and is leased through Gold Coast city council. It is currently home to the Major League Baseball Australia Academy Program (MLBAAP).

The stadium is widely regarded as one of Australia's premium baseball facilities and was used by the gold medal United States national baseball team for their successful pre-Olympic Games training in 2000. It has also been home to the Gold Coast Clippers and Daikyo Dolphins when they played in the now defunct Australian Baseball League and International Baseball League of Australia. It has also been a training facility for the Australia national baseball team, Canada national baseball team, Queensland Rams and various Korean and Japanese teams as well as being the host of the 2008 Olympic Games Qualification, Senior and Junior Oceanic Championships, Australian Baseball Federation Diamond Awards and several goodwill series as part of the MLBAAP program.

== Features ==
The field features a premium major league standard clay infield with a laser levelled and lush Bermuda grass outfield. The diamond is complemented by television quality floodlighting, grandstand seating to fit 2,500.

Included as part of the facility is two JUGS pitching machines, a full batting cage and hitting screen facilities, a secondary practice diamond, full dressing room amenities and on-site team meeting rooms including a mess room.

== See also ==
- Sports on the Gold Coast, Queensland
