= International Baseball League of Australia =

The International Baseball League of Australia was a baseball league which existed from 1999 to 2002.

The league was created by David Nilsson after he purchased the rights to the Australian Baseball League in 1999 when it was near financial collapse. The International Baseball League lasted for 3 seasons before Nilsson handed the rights back over to the Australian Baseball Federation in 2002. Following the collapse there was no professional baseball league until it was announced in 2009 the formation of the new Australian Baseball League starting in 2010. The idea behind the International Baseball League of Australia was to be a winter league from November to January as a means to help gain off-season competition for players centered in Asia and the United States.

== Formation ==
- In January 1999 the Australian Baseball Federation announced the agreement to sell the league's license and rights to Nilcorp (David Nilsson's company).
- On 14 February 1999 the Sydney Storm lost the last game of the Australian Baseball League against the Gold Coast Cougars in the second of the championship series held at Homebush.
- In April 1999 Nilcorp officially signed the license of agreement to run a national baseball league in Australia for the next 100 years.
- In December 1999 Nilcorp began the Claxton Shield competition with teams from WA, SA, NSW, Queensland and Victoria.
- In November 2000 the International Baseball League of Australia was formed on the Gold Coast with four teams-the MLB Stars (a team that was made up of USA minor league players), an International team (players from South Korea, United States, Australia, and Japan), Taiwan, and Australia.

== Collapse ==
- On 5 December 2000 the Claxton Shield was canceled because due to the poor conditions at the Blacktown Olympic complex. Because of the short notice the International Baseball League was unable to find a replacement venue on such short notice.
- In January 2001 the International Baseball League All-Star game gets canceled.
- In September 2001 the International Baseball League is canceled because of "destabilizing" impact that terrorist attacks on America.
- In April 2002 the International Baseball League in Australia collapses and is no more.

== Teams ==
- Australia Provincial 2002
- IBLA Australia 2001
- IBLA Internationals 2001
- MLB All-Stars 2001
- New South Wales Country 2000
- New South Wales Patriots 2000, 2002
- Queensland Rams 2000, 2002
- South Australia Bite 2000, 2002
- Taiwan national team 2001
- Victoria Aces 2000, 2002
- Western Heelers 2000, 2002

== Seasons ==
=== 1999-2000 ===
The 1999–2000 season was conducted as a National League with a team based in each of the major Australian mainland cities and a second team based in Country New South Wales. The development league and All-Star game were not held in this season.

The Western Heelers defeated the Queensland Rams 2 games to 1 in the Championship series held at Palm Meadows.

The IBLA Most Valuable Player Award for this season was awarded to Chris Snelling, playing for Country NSW.

=== 2000-01 ===
The 2000–01 season saw the National League and All-Star game canceled with the Development League being held on the Gold Coast at Palm Meadows, The development league was held between 4 teams; IBLA Internationals, IBLA Australia, MLB All-Stars and the Taiwan National Team. The development league was won by IBLA Internationals who defeated IBLA Australia 2–1 in the Championship game.

=== 2001-02 ===
2002 was the final season of the IBLA, The league reverted to the traditional Claxton Shield format and held at a single venue, the Melbourne Ballpark. It was competed between all the major mainland states of Australia and a new Australian Provincial team. The 2002 league featured no Development League and no All-Star game.

The Victoria Aces defeated Western Heelers in the Championship Game 6–5.
