= List of baseball teams in Australia =

The following is a list of currently active amateur or professional open baseball teams in Australia. It includes the league(s) they play for.

== Australian Capital Territory ==
Team	Suburb	Notes
Ainslie Gungahlin Bears	Ainslie	
Bandits Baseball Club	Aranda	
Eagles Baseball Club	Kambah	
Weston Creek Indians	Stirling	
Tuggeranong Vikings	Wanniassa	
Rebels Baseball Club	Curtin	

== New South Wales ==
=== New South Wales Major League ===
Team	City	Notes
Auburn Orioles	Auburn, Sydney	Most 1st, 2nd & 3rd Grade Premierships of all active clubs. now merged with Macarthur Colts to become Macarthur Orioles
Baulkham Hills	Northmead, Sydney	Current & Most Club Championships.
Blacktown Workers	Huntingwood, Sydney	
Canterbury Bankstown Vikings	Riverwood, Sydney	
Central Coast Marlins	Gosford, Central Coast	
Cronulla Sharks	Cronulla, Sydney	Was Equal most U/18 Premierships
Macarthur Colts	Campbelltown, Sydney	now merged with Auburn Orioles to become Macarthur Orioles
Manly Warringah	Allambie Heights, Sydney	
North Shore Knights	Northbridge, Sydney	
Penrith Panthers	Cranebrook, Sydney	
Ryde Eastwood Hawks	North Ryde, Sydney	

=== Illawarra Baseball League ===
Team	City	Notes
Berkeley Eagles	Berkeley, Wollongong	
Northern Pirates	Bulli, Wollongong	2009 Third & fourth Grade Champions, Home field at Fairy Meadow
Dapto Chiefs	Dapto, Wollongong	2009 Fifth Grade Champion
Dapto Panthers	Koonawarra, Wollongong	Minor Leagues Only
Kiama Braves	Kiama Downs, Kiama	
Shellharbour City Warriors	Lake Illawarra, Shellharbour	Minor Leagues Only
Shoalhaven Mariners	Nowra/Bomaderry	South Nowra complex is completed in 2014.
Wests Illawarra Cardinals	Cringila, Wollongong	2009 First Grade, Second Grade & Overall Club Champions

=== New South Wales Women's Baseball League ===
Team	City	Notes
Blacktown Workers	Huntingwood, Sydney	A Grade
Baulkham Hills	Northmead, Sydney	A Grade and B Grade
Central Coast Marlins	Gosford, Central Coast	A Grade
Cronulla Sharks	Cronulla, Sydney	A Grade
Penrith Panthers	Cranebrook, Sydney	B Grade
Ryde Eastwood Hawks	North Ryde, Sydney	A Grade
Greenway Giants	Cherrybrook, Sydney	A Grade and B Grade
Canterbury Bankstown Vikings	Riverwood, Sydney	B Grade
Warringah Warriors	Sydney, Sydney	B Grade

=== Other Clubs ===
Team	City	Notes
Alstonville Baseball Club	Alstonville	Far North Coast Division 2 Minors
Ballina Sharks	Ballina	Far North Coast Division 1 & 2 Minors
Casino Baseball Club	Casino	Far North Coast Division 1, 2 & 3 Minors
Kyogle Baseball Club	Kyogle	Far North Coast Division 3 Minors
Marist Brothers Old Boys	Lismore	Far North Coast Division 3 Minors
Northern Rivers Baseball Club	Tweed Heads South	Far North Coast Division 3 Minors
Townsville Indians	Townsville	No current competition

== Northern Territory ==
=== Darwin Baseball League ===
Team	City	Notes
Nightcliff Tigers	Nightcliff, Darwin	13 Premierships
Palmerston Reds	Palmerston	5 Premierships (includes as Waratahs)
Pints Green Sox	Marrara, Darwin	6 Premierships & current champions
Tracy Village Rebels	Wanguri, Darwin	19 Premierships (includes as Northern Districts)

== Queensland ==
=== Greater Brisbane League ===
Team	City	Notes
All Stars	Hendra	
Beenleigh Hawks	Beenleigh	
Carina Redsox	Carina	
Ipswich Musketeers	Tivoli	
Mudgeeraba Redsox	Mudgeeraba	
Narangba Demons	Narangba	
Pine Hills Lightning	Bunya	
Pine Rivers Rapids	Bray Park	Current A-Grade Northside minor premiers
Redcliffe Padres	Redcliffe	Current Commissioners Shield champion
Redlands Rays	Sheldon	
Runcorn Indians	Runcorn	
Surfers Paradise	Benowa	
Toowoomba Rangers	Toowoomba	
Western Districts Bulldogs	Darra	
Windsor Royals	Newmarket	Current A Grade champions

=== Gold Coast Winter League ===
Team	City	Notes
Coomera Cubs	Coomera	
East Redbirds	Lismore	
Lismore Workers	East Lismore	
Mudgeeraba Redsox	Mudgeeraba	
Nerang Cardinals	Nerang	
North Bears	Lismore	
Redlands Rays	Sheldon	Invitational team
Robina Braves	Robina	Current champion
Runaway Bay Dolphins	Runaway Bay	
Tallebudgera Alleygators	Tallebudgera	
Surfers Paradise	Benowa	Most championships

=== Cairns Senior League ===
Team	City	Notes
Cairns City Reds	Cairns	
Cairns Heat	Trinity Beach	
Shogun Heat	Trinity Beach	Current champion
Smithfield Cubs	Smithfield	

=== Far North Coast Major League ===
Team	City	Notes
Coomera Cubs	Coomera, Gold Coast	
East Redbirds	Lismore, New South Wales	
Lismore Workers	East Lismore, New South Wales	
North Bears	Lismore, New South Wales	Current champion
Robina Braves	Robina, Gold Coast	
Surfers Paradise	Benowa, Gold Coast	

=== Other Clubs ===
Team	City	Notes
Alstonville Baseball Club	Alstonville	Far North Coast Division 2 Minors
Ballina Sharks	Ballina	Far North Coast Division 1 & 2 Minors
Casino Baseball Club	Casino	Far North Coast Division 1, 2 & 3 Minors
Kyogle Baseball Club	Kyogle	Far North Coast Division 3 Minors
Marist Brothers Old Boys	Lismore	Far North Coast Division 3 Minors
Townsville Indians	Townsville	No current competition

== South Australia ==
=== South Australian Baseball League ===
Team	City	Notes
Adelaide Angels	Plympton	
East Torrens Redsox	Payneham	
Glenelg Tigers	Glenelg	
Golden Grove Dodgers	Surrey Downs	
Goodwood Indians	Colonel Light Gardens	
Henley and Grange rams	West Lakes	
Kensington Cardinals	Erindale	
Northern Reds	Ingle Farm	
Port Adelaide Magpies	Port Adelaide	
Southern Hawks	Christie Downs	
Sturt Saints	Mitcham	Current state league division 1 premier
West Torrens Eagles	Lockleys	
Woodville Senators	Findon	

=== South Australia Women's Baseball League ===
Team	City	Notes
Flinders University	Bedford Park	
Goodwood/Northern Districts	Ingle Farm	
Woodville Senators	Findon	current women’s Div 1 premier

== Tasmania ==
=== Baseball Tasmania League ===
Team	City	Notes
Athletics	Tasmania	
Blue Jays	Tasmania	
Red Sox	Tasmania	
Whitesox	Tasmania	

== Victoria ==
=== Victorian Summer Baseball League (VSBL) ===
Team	City	Notes
Berwick City		
Blackburn		
Bonbeach		
Bundoora		
Chelsea		
Cheltenham		
Doncaster Dragons		
Essendon Bombers		
Fitzroy Lions		
Footscray		
Geelong Baycats		
Malvern		
Melbourne		
Melbourne University		
Moorabbin		
Mulgrave		
Newport		
North Coburg Rebels		
Ormond/Glenhuntly		
Port Melbourne		
Preston		
Sandringham		
Springvale		
St Kilda		
Sunshine		
Upwey Ferntree Gully		
Waverley		
Werribee		
Williamstown Wolves		

=== Melbourne Winter Baseball League ===
Team	City	Notes
Bundoora		
Croydon		
Diamond Creek		
Doncaster		
Footscray		
Forest Hill		
Glen Iris		
GMBC		
Greensborough		
Heathmont		
Knox		
Latrobe Uni		
Melbourne University		
Melton		
North Balwyn		
Northcote Lions		
North Coburg Rebels		
Panton Hill		
Research		
Ringwood		
RMIT		
Watsonia		
Waverley		
Westgarth		

=== Dandenong Baseball Association – Winter ===
Team	City	Notes
Boneo	Rosebud	
Berwick	Berwick	
Bonbeach StChads	Bonbeach	
Chelsea	Chelsea	
Cheltenham	Cheltenham	
Dandenong	Dandenong	
Dingley	Dingley	
Frankston	Frankston	
Moorabbin	Moorabbin	
Mordialloc	Mordialloc	Created in 2017. Plays at Cheltenham Baseball Club grounds. Member of the MWBL in 2018 and 19.
Mornington	Mornington	
Ormond Glenhuntly	Ormond	
Pakenham	Pakenham	
Sandringham	Sandringham	

=== Bendigo Baseball Association – Winter ===
Team	City	Notes
Bendigo East Baseball Club	Quarry Hill	
Falcons Baseball Club	Eaglehawk	
Malmsbury Rangers	Malmsbury	
Scots Baseball Club	Eaglehawk	
Strathfieldsaye Dodgers	Strathfieldsaye	

=== Geelong Baseball Association – Winter ===
Team	City	Notes
Alfredton Eagles	Ballarat	
Ballarat Royals	Ballarat	
Bellarine Bears	Wallington	
Colac Braves	Colac	
Corio Tigers	Corio	
Deakin Blues	Highton	
East Belmont Saints	Grovedale	15 Firsts Premierships, 2024 Premiers, 24 Club Championships, 2021, 2022, 2023, 2024 Club Champions
Guild Lions	Grovedale	
Lara Wildcats	Lara	
Werribee Giants	Werribee	
Williamstown Wolves	Williamstown	

=== Victorian Women's Baseball ===
==== Summer League (VSBL) ====
Team	City	Notes
Bundoora Brumbies	Coburg North	Division 3
Doncaster Dragons	Doncaster	Division 1, 2 & 3
[Essendon Baseball Club	Strathmore Heights	Division 1, 2
Footscray Baseball Club	Yarraville	Division 3
Malvern Baseball Club	Kooyong	Division 1 & 3
Melbourne Demons	Box Hill	Division 1 & 2
Moorabbin Panthers	Moorabbin	Division 3
Ormond Glenhuntly Hunter	Ormond	Division 3
Port Melbourne Mariners	Port Melbourne	Division 1 & 3
Sandringham Royals	Sandringham	Division 3
Springvale Lions	Springvale	Division 1 & 2
Upwey Ferntree Gully Tigers	Upper Ferntree Gully	Division 3
Waverley Wildcats	Glen Waverley	Division 2 & 3
Werribee Giants	Werribee	Division 1 & 2

== Western Australia ==
=== Western Australia State League ===
Team	Suburb	Homeground	Colours
Carine Cats	Carine	Carine Open Space	Black, light blue, white
Gosnells Hawks	Thornlie	Tom Bateman Reserve	Navy blue, white, grey
Braves	Willagee	Winnacott Reserve	Blue, yellow, white
Morley Eagles	Morley	LM Simms Field (Crimea Park)	Navy blue, red, white
Perth	Inglewood	Inglewood Oval	Blue, red, white
Rockingham Rams	Rockingham	Hourglass Reserve	Red, black, white
South Perth Cubs	Como	Grayden Reserve	Blue, white
Swan Districts Black Ducks	Middle Swan	Charlie Hodder Field (North Swan Park)	Black, white
Victoria Park Reds	Belmont	Forster Park	Black, red, white
Wanneroo Giants	Madeley	Mateljan Park	Black, orange, white
UWA Magpies	Mount Claremont	UWA Sports Park	Green, yellow, black, white

=== Provincial League ===
Team	City	Notes
Balcatta Bears	Balcatta	Current Provincial League Premiers
Carine Cats	Carine	
Curtin Ball Club	Bentley	
Eastern Hills Hornets	Chidlow	
Kalmunda Rangers	Maida Vale	
Kelmscott Bulldogs	Kelmscott	
West Stirling Indians	Karrinyup	
Yangebup Knights	Bibra Lake	

== See also ==
- List of Australian rules football clubs in Australia
- List of basketball clubs in Australia
- Cricket in Australia
- List of rowing clubs in Australia
- List of rugby league clubs in Australia
- List of rugby union clubs in Australia
- List of soccer clubs in Australia
- List of yacht clubs in Australia
- Australia national baseball team
- List of Major League Baseball players from Australia
- Claxton Shield
- Australian Baseball League (1989–1999)
