= List of Greater Brisbane League seasons =

This is a list of seasons of the Greater Brisbane League.

== Pre-War Fixtures ==
| Year | Champion |
|---|---|
| 1932 | Valleys^{[A]} |
| 1933 | Valleys |
| 1934 | Valleys |
| 1935 | Eastern Suburbs |
| 1936 | Valley |
| 1937 | Valley |
| 1938 | Valley |
| 1939 | Valley |

== Queensland Baseball Association Fixtures ==
| Year | Champion |
|---|---|
| 1946 | Brown and Broad |
| 1947 | Brown and Broad |
| 1948 | University |
| 1949 | Windsor Engineers |
| 1950 | University |
| 1951 | Windsor Engineers |
| 1952 | Windsor Engineers |
| 1953 | Windsor Engineers |

== Metropolitan Baseball Fixtures ==
| Year | Champion |
|---|---|
| 1954 | Truck and Tractor |
| 1955 | Vogue Green |
| 1956 | Vogue Green |
| 1957 | Souths |
| 1958 | Vogue |
| 1959 | Vogue |
| 1960 | All Stars |
| 1961 | Victory/Souths |
| 1962 | Victory/Souths |
| 1963 | Victory/Souths |
| 1964 | Victory/Souths |
| 1965 | All Stars |
| 1966 | Mount Gravatt Eagles |
| 1967 | Ipswich Musketeers |
| 1968 | University |
| 1969 | All Stars |
| 1970 | All Stars |
| 1971 | All Stars |
| 1972 | All Stars |
| 1973 | Mount Gravatt Eagles |
| 1974 | Athletics |
| 1975 | All Stars |
| 1976 | Windsor Royals |
| 1977 | All Stars |

== Brisbane Baseball Association Fixtures ==
| Year | Champion |
|---|---|
| 1978 | Windsor Royals |
| 1979 | Windsor Royals |
| 1980 | Windsor Royals |
| 1981 | Windsor Royals |
| 1982 | Wests Bulldogs |
| 1983 | Wests Bulldogs |
| 1984 | Wests Bulldogs |
| 1985 | Wests Bulldogs |
| 1986 | Ipswich Musketeers |
| 1987 | Ipswich Musketeers |
| 1988 | Ipswich Musketeers |
| 1989 | Ipswich Musketeers |
| 1990 | Wests Bulldogs |
| 1991 | Indians |
| 1992 | Indians |
| 1993 | Indians |
| 1994 | Indians |
| 1995 | Indians |
| 1996 | Indians |
| 1997 | All Stars |
| 1998 | Indians |
| 1999 | Pine Rivers Rapids |
| 2000 | Windsor Royals |
| 2001 | Ipswich Musketeers |
| 2002 | Indians |
| 2003 | Wests Bulldogs |

== Greater Brisbane League ==
| Year | Champion |
|---|---|
| 2004 | Surfers Paradise |
| 2005 | Redlands |
| 2006 | Surfers Paradise |
| 2007 | Surfers Paradise |
| 2008 | Indians |
| 2009 | Surfers Paradise |
| 2010 | Wests Bulldogs |
| 2011 | Pine Hills Lightning |
| 2012 | Surfers Paradise |
| 2013 | Windsor Royals |
| 2014 | Windsor Royals |
| 2015 | Windsor Royals |
| 2016 | Windsor Royals |
| 2017 | Windsor Royals |
| 2018 | Surfers Paradise |
| 2019 | Windsor Royals |
| 2020 | Pine Hills Lightning^{[B]} |
| 2021 | Windsor Royals |
| 2022 | Pine Rivers Rapids |
| 2023 | Windsor Royals |
| 2024 | Surfers Paradise |
| 2025 | Windsor Royals |

== Notes ==
- ^{A} It is written in Queensland Baseball History as Valleys dominated the season, but never directly mentioned they won the competition as the 1932 season was an informal set of fixtures between the four inaugural clubs, Western Suburbs, Eastern Suburbs, Valleys and Toombul.
- ^{B} The 2020 finals series was cancelled due to the COVID-19 pandemic. Pine Hills were declared the winners after leading the standings at the conclusion of the regular season
