= Baseball Australia Diamond Awards =

The Baseball Australia Diamond Awards — begun in 2006 — are given annually by the Australian Baseball Federation, to honor persons who have excelled in playing, managing, or serving the sport of baseball. The awards ceremony is usually held in or about February, soon after the conclusion of that year's season, which starts in or about November of the preceding year. Also at each ceremony, the Baseball Australia Hall of Fame inducts new members.

== Player of the Year - Open Male ==
- 2006 - Chris Oxspring (New South Wales)
- 2007 - Peter Moylan (Victoria)
- 2008 - Peter Moylan (Victoria)
- 2009 -
- 2010 - Trent Oeltjen (New South Wales)
- 2011 - Trent Oeltjen (New South Wales)
- 2012 - Luke Hughes (Western Australia)
- 2013 - Travis Blackley (Victoria)
- 2014 - Grant Balfour (New South Wales)
- 2015 - Liam Hendriks (Western Australia)

== Player of the Year - Open Female ==
- 2006 - Chelsea Forkin (Western Australia)
- 2007 - Amy McCann (Victoria)
- 2008 - Simone Wearne (Victoria)
- 2009 - Simone Wearne (Victoria)
- 2010 - Tahnee Lovering (New South Wales)
- 2011 - Katie Gaynor (New South Wales)
- 2012 - Laura Neads (New South Wales)
- 2013 - Christina Kreppold (Western Australia)
- 2014 - Shae Lillywhite (Victoria)
- 2015 - Stephanie Gaynor (New South Wales)

== Player of the Year - Youth (Under 18) ==
- 2006 - Allan de San Miguel (Western Australia)
- 2007 - Jason Smit (Western Australia)
- 2008 - Mitch Dening (New South Wales) and Steven Kent (Australian Capital Territory)
- 2009 - James Linger (Queensland)
- 2010 - Nathan Driessen (Western Australia)
- 2011 - Ryan Battaglia (Queensland)
- 2012 - Zach Shepherd (New South Wales)
- 2013 - Elliott Hargreaves (Western Australia)
- 2014 - Lewis Thorpe (Victoria)
- 2015 - Lachlan Wells (New South Wales)

== Coach of the Year ==
- 2006 - Jon Deeble (Victoria)
- 2007 - Peter Gahan (Queensland)
- 2008 - Damian Shanahan (Australian Capital Territory)
- 2009 - Tony Harris (South Australia)
- 2010 - Don Kyle (Western Australia)
- 2011 - Phil Dale (Victoria), John Gaynor (New South Wales) and Tony Harris (South Australia)
- 2012 - Shaun Smith (New South Wales)
- 2013 - Damian Shanahan (Victoria)
- 2014 - Graeme Lloyd (Western Australia - High Performance) and Glen Tovey (Western Australia - Club)
- 2015 - Steve Fish (Western Australia - High Performance) and Adrian Lamb (Queensland - Club)

== Official of the Year ==
- 2006 - Neil Poulton (South Australia)
- 2007 - Paula Kenning (Queensland)
- 2008 - Mark Gooding (Victoria)
- 2009 - Mal Mackay (Queensland)
- 2010 - Paul Hyham (New South Wales)
- 2011 - Lorraine Dunn (South Australia)
- 2012 - Brett Robson (Western Australia)
- 2013 - Jennie Moloney (Victoria)
- 2014 - Paul Hyham (New South Wales)
- 2015 - Jon Byrne (Western Australia)

== Administrator of the Year ==
- 2006 - Michael Carter (South Australia)
- 2007 - Steve Walker (Victoria)
- 2008 - David Hayes (Western Australia)
- 2009 - Shane Tonkin (Western Australia)
- 2010 - Geoff Hooker (Western Australia)
- 2011 - Colin Dick (Queensland)
- 2012 - Mark Beutler (Australian Capital Territory)
- 2013 - Theo Vassalakis (Australian Capital Territory)
- 2014 - Shayne Bennett (South Australia)
- 2015 - Di Mount-Bryson (Western Australia)

== Volunteer of the Year ==
- 2006 - Pat Milmlow (New South Wales - National) and Robyn Karlsen (Victoria - Club)
- 2007 - Lisa Hooley (Northern Territory)
- 2008 - Tony McPhail (Queensland)
- 2009 - Louise Paewai (Queensland)
- 2010 - Charles Conrad (Northern Territory)
- 2011 - Philip McConachie (New South Wales)
- 2012 - Kevin Rogers (Queensland), Rod & Julie Tuckwell (New South Wales)
- 2013 - Grantley Wienert (South Australia) and Ken Robson (New South Wales)
- 2014 - Kerry Tsui (New South Wales)
- 2015 - Kerry Jackson (New South Wales)

== Club of the Year ==
- 2006 - Ku-Ring-Gai Stealers (New South Wales)
- 2007 - Wanneroo Giants (Western Australia) and Quakers Hill Pirates (New South Wales)
- 2008 - Macleay Valley Cougars (New South Wales)
- 2009 - Doncaster Dragons (Victoria) and Peninsula Padres (Queensland)
- 2010 - Baulkham Hills (New South Wales)
- 2011 - Belmont (New South Wales) and Beenleigh Hawks (Queensland)
- 2012 - Pine Hills Lightning (Queensland) and MacArthur (New South Wales)
- 2013 - Carina Redsox (Queensland)
- 2014 - Windsor Royals (Queensland)
- 2015 - Essendon Bombers (Victoria)

== State Association of the Year ==
- 2006 - Baseball Victoria
- 2007 - Baseball Queensland
- 2008 - Baseball WA
- 2009 - Baseball WA
- 2010 - Baseball ACT
- 2011 - Baseball Queensland
- 2012 - Baseball NSW
- 2013 - Baseball ACT
- 2014 - Baseball WA
- 2015 - Baseball SA

== President's Award ==
- 2006 - Not Awarded
- 2007 - Norm Perry
- 2008 - Danny Maruyama
- 2009 - Ken Wesslink
- 2010 - Major League Baseball
- 2011 - Not Awarded
- 2012 - Neil Barrowcliff
- 2013 - David Balfour
- 2014 - Not Awarded
- 2015 - William Sinclair

== Award of Distinction ==
- 2010 - Peter Dihm (Victoria)

== See also ==
- Baseball awards#Australia
- Baseball in Australia
- Australian Sport Awards
- Sports Performer Awards
- Neil Page
