= Gary Nilsson =

Australian baseball player (born 1963)

Gary Nilsson (born 28 November 1963 in Brisbane, Australia) is an Australian former baseball player who played as a pitcher for the Lakeland Tigers in 1984 and in the Australian Baseball League from 1989 to 1996. He is the brother of former All-Star, Dave Nilsson as well as former minor leaguer Bob Nilsson. His son is Mitch Nilsson, currently contracted to the Cleveland Indians and nephew Jay Nilsson, former Gulf Coast Indians player. He is currently pitching coach for the Brisbane Bandits in the Australian Baseball League.

== Playing career ==
Gary was signed by the Detroit Tigers in 1983. The next year, he played in advanced A baseball with the Lakeland Tigers and was 1–4 with a 5.95 ERA. He was released at the end of the year.

In 1989, when the Australian Baseball League was founded, the right-hander was picked up by the Gold Coast Cougars. He batted at a .289/.352/.378 clip as a first baseman in the 1989–90 Australian Baseball League season, second on the team to brother Bob Nilsson. In the 1990–1991 season, he was 6–1 with one save and a 5.96 ERA for the Daikyo Dolphins. The following year, he had a 5–4, 4.62 record for Daikyo, threw a one-hitter and helped the team to an ABL title.

In 1992–1993, Nilsson was 3–0 with a 2.50 ERA with the Brisbane Bandits, despite spending a lot of the season injured. In 1993–1994, Gary had a 2–2, 2.42 record, helping Brisbane win the title, picking up the win in the final game of the season, pitching to his younger brother Dave.

The next year season was a bit of a low one for Nilsson as he was 0–4 with four saves and a 5.06 ERA, but did join with Kelly Wunsch and Cam Cairncross on a combined no-hitter. His career ended due to injuries in 1996, after a 1–3, 6.35 campaign in 1995–1996. His career in the Australian Baseball League totalled to a 17–14 record with 5 saves and a 4.57 ERA in 56 games.

Gary is now a coach with the Pine Rivers Rapids in the Greater Brisbane League.
