= Neil Page =

Australian baseball representative

Neil Philip Page (born 17 January 1944) is an Australian former baseball player. A left-hand starting pitcher, he regularly played for Australia from 1964 until 1977.

== Career ==
Page was born in Adelaide, the son of Roy Page, a well-known local baseball identity. As a junior, Page grew up playing for the Glenelg Tigers and Adelaide Angels baseball clubs, before transferring, in 1969, to the Goodwood Indians baseball club in the South Australian Baseball League (SABL). Page attended Adelaide Boys High School from February 1956 to 1960.

On 1 February 1966, Page became the first modern Australian player to sign a professional contract with a Major League Baseball organisation, the Cincinnati Reds. He remained with the organisation until 16 October 1967, but was released following an arm injury. Page won the Helms Award in 1969, regarded as Australian Baseball's most prestigious award; and is judged based on a players performance in National Claxton Shield competition. He also won the Capps Medal in 1974, for the "best and fairest" player during the regular SABL season (i.e. not including finals matches) as decided upon by umpires votes. Page played for South Australia at 8 Claxton Shields (1964, 1965, 1967, 1969, 1970, 1971, 1973 & 1974) and Western Australia at 3 Claxton Shields (1975, 1976 & 1977). In 1977, Page won the President's Medal, for the Most Valuable Player in the West Australian Baseball League.

On 16 March 1972, Page was involved in one of the greatest games in Australian baseball history. Under lights at Norwood Oval, in the 1971/72 SABL Grand final between the Goodwood Indians and Port Adelaide Magpies, Page pitched all 19 innings (21 strikeouts, 9 hits & 1 walk), only to lose the game 4 – 2.

In the book, A History of Australian Baseball: Time and Game, Page is described as "one of the greatest pitchers Australia has ever produced". At the 2000 Millennium Sports Award recognising achievements in Australian sport, Page won the Australian Sports Medal for "45 years involvement in Baseball as player and coach, many individual achievements". In 2005, Page was an inaugural inductee into the Baseball Australia Hall of Fame. At the 2009 Baseball Australia Diamond Awards, Page was named as a starting pitcher to the 75th Diamond Anniversary Claxton Shield All Stars team.
