= Mitch Nilsson =

Mitchell Nilsson

Heidenheim Heideköpfe
- Utility
- Born: 24 May 1991 (age 35); Brisbane, Australia
- Bats: Switch Throws: Right

ABL debut
- 13 November, 2010, for the Brisbane Bandits

ABL statistics (through 2018/19)
- Batting average: .270
- Home runs: 29
- Runs batted in: 111
- Stats at Baseball Reference
Medals
Men's baseball
Representing Australia
Haarlem Baseball Week
Bronze medal – third place	2016 Haarlem	National team

Mitchell Caine Nilsson (born 24 May 1991) is an Australian professional baseball third baseman for the Heidenheim Heideköpfe of the Baseball Bundesliga and the Brisbane Bandits of the Australian Baseball League (ABL).

Mitchell is the son of former professional player Gary Nilsson, cousin of Jay Nilsson, Jacob Nilsson, Daniel Nilsson and nephew of Bob Nilsson and former All-Star, Dave Nilsson.

He is a previous member of the MLB organization Cleveland Indians and has most recently spent time with Kotlarka Prague in the Czech Extraleague. He has played with the Australia schoolboy team,^{[3]} Australia AAA team, AA team twice^{[4]} and single A (Cal Ripken team).^{[5]} Nilsson made his debut for the Queensland Rams as a catcher in the 2010 Claxton Shield.

== Professional career ==
=== Brisbane Bandits ===
Nilsson is an originating member of the Brisbane Bandits from inaugural season of the Australian Baseball League (ABL) making his debut on 13 November 2010 and has played in all nine seasons, albeit only playing one game in each of the 2012–13 and 2013-14 seasons.

From 2010/11 - 2013/14 Nilsson struggled for playing time for the Bandits playing only 43 games over four seasons. This in part is due to a shoulder injury which set back his 2012/13 and 2013/14 season.

Nilsson's breakout year was well after his release from affiliated baseball. In the 2014-15 Australian Baseball League season, he started playing infield for the first time since his junior years. Nilsson's injury free streak rolled into 2015, when he signed with Kotlarka Praha in the Czech Extraliga and in 24 games, hit .408/.463/.980 with 14 homers.

This form would continue into the 2015-16 Australian Baseball League season, where he hit .284/.363/.480 as an everyday player and integral part of the Bandits first of four consecutive ABL championships. Over this span and through the 2018-19 season, Nilsson would hit .305 with 24 home runs in 122 games.

Nilsson improved on his versatility from the 2017-18 season, moving to left field full time.

=== Kotlarka Prague ===
Mitchell spent early 2015 playing for Kotlarka Prague in Czech Extraleague which culminated with Mitchell guiding Prague to their first Czech Baseball Championship, defeating reigning champions Draci Brno.

Nilsson was the recipient of the USAsports.cz award for best foreigner in the Czech Extraleague.

=== Cleveland Indians ===
Nilsson was a member of the Cleveland Indians organization from 2007 through to 2014. Nilsson spent most of the time playing in minor development leagues before an unfortunate shoulder injury ended this stint in late 2013.

=== Mannheim Tornados ===
Nilsson signed with the Mannheim Tornados of Germany's Baseball Bundesliga for the 2019 season.

=== Heidenheim Heideköpfe ===
Nilsson returned to Germany for the 2020 season, signing with the Heidenheim Heideköpfe of the Baseball Bundesliga.

== International career ==
He was selected Australia national baseball team at the 2017 World Baseball Classic, 2018 exhibition series against Japan and 2019 WBSC Premier12.
