= Redcliffe Showgrounds =

Showgrounds in Redcliffe, Queensland

- Interactive map of Redcliffe Showgrounds
- Location: Scarborough Road, Redcliffe, Queensland
- Coordinates: 27°13′32″S 153°6′29″E
- Owner: Moreton Bay Regional Council
- Capacity: 1,800
- Surface: Grass

The Redcliffe Showgrounds is a showground in Redcliffe, Queensland for the annual Redcliffe Show the June holidays. Whilst the show is not on, it is home to the Redcliffe Darts club, Redcliffe Bingo and PCYC Over 35 soccer club. It was the main field for the Redcliffe Dolphins until 1982, before the club moved to Dolphin Oval, but it still serves as a training ground.

Before 2004, the Redcliffe Padres Baseball Club had called the Redcliffe Showgrounds home for 12 years, taking advantage of the great floodlighting facilities. In 2004, the club moved to the recently built field at Talobilla Park in Kippa-Ring.
