= Mark Peters (sport administrator) =

Mark Peters is an Australian former baseball player, and sport administrator. From 2012 to 2018, Peters was the chief executive officer of the Gold Coast 2018 Commonwealth Games Corporation Organising Committee.

== Baseball ==
Peters was born in Adelaide, South Australia. He played in the South Australian Baseball League and won the Capps Medal for the 1977/78 season. Peters played in and captained the Australian baseball team for over 10 years. In 2012, he was still playing baseball at the masters competition level.

Peters has contributed significantly to the development of baseball in Australia as an administrator. Between 1998 and 2001, he was president of the Australian Baseball Federation. Prior to this appointment, he held other Federation board positions. In 2009, Peters was the inaugural chair of the Major League Baseball Australia Academy Program and chair of the Major League Baseball's Australian Baseball League. Peters has also served as president of the Oceania Baseball Confederation and board member of the International Baseball Federation.

== Sport administration ==
In 1983, Peters began his sport administration career as a manager at South Australian Department of Recreation, Sport and Racing. In 1987, he took up a managerial position with Tasmanian Department of Tourism, Sport and Recreation. From 1990 to 2001, Peters held senior managerial positions in Queensland departments managing tourism, sport and recreation. In 2001, he was appointed the executive director of the Australian Sports Commission. Peters was given the task taking Australian sport beyond the success of the 2000 Sydney Olympics. Peters resigned from the Australian Sports Commission in 2008. Major outcomes during Peters leadership were the redevelopment of Australian Institute of Sport facilities, the establishment of the Active After-school Communities program for children, improved sports governance and the overhaul of soccer (football) in Australia, in particular Football Federation Australia. In 2010, Peters was appointed the chief executive officer of the Gold Coast 2018 Commonwealth Games Bid Company. The bid was successful and in 2012 Peters was appointed chief executive officer of the Gold Coast 2018 Commonwealth Games Corporation Organising Committee. In being appointed to the position Gold Coast Mayor Ron Clarke stated that Mr Peters was "the key" to the successful bid.

== Education ==
Peters has completed a Business Degree and a Graduate Diploma in Recreation Planning. He attended Harvard University's six-week Advanced Management Program, and is a member of the Australian Institute of Company Directors. He is an adjunct professor at University of Canberra.

== Recognition ==
- 1977/78 – Capps Medal – Best Player in the South Australian Baseball League
- 2000 – Australian Sports Medal
- 2020 - OAM - for service to sports administration, and to baseball.
