= Jay Nilsson =

Australian baseball player (born 1987)

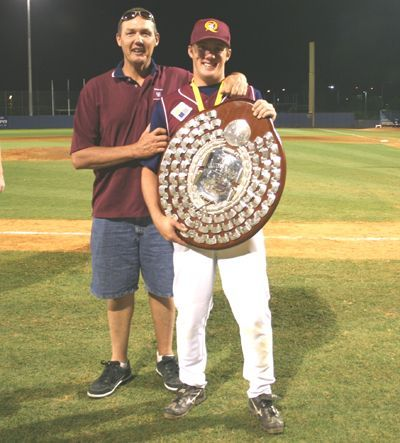
- Jay with Bob Nilsson and the 2006 Claxton Shield

Brisbane Bandits – No. 20
- Third base
- Born: 1 November 1987 (age 38); Redcliffe, Queensland, Australia
- Bats: Right Throws: Right

ABL debut
- 4 November, 2011

ABL statistics
- Batting average: .000
- On-base plus slugging: .105
- Runs batted in: 2
- Stats at Baseball Reference

Jay Nilsson (born 1 November 1987 in Redcliffe, Queensland) is a former minor league baseball player for the Gulf Coast Indians. He is the son of Bob Nilsson, a top Australian league reliever of the 1990s. Jay's uncle David Nilsson was the first Australian All-Star in the major leagues. His other uncles Gary Nilsson and Ron Nilsson also played in Australia; Gary spent one year in the minor leagues.

== Career ==
Jay signed with the Cleveland Indians in January 2006. In the 2006 Claxton Shield competition, he was 6 for 13 with two doubles for the Queensland Rams to win Rookie of the Year honours. He debuted well in the US that summer, hitting .276/.371/.474 for the GCL Indians. He was 6 for 20 with a walk and a double in the 2007 Claxton Shield. With the 2007 GCL Indians, Nilsson did not fare as well, batting .229/.340/.373 with 27 strikeouts in 26 games and was released in late 2007.

While playing for the Redcliffe Padres baseball club as the Major A catcher and he was selected to represent Queensland again for the Claxton Shield 2008 squad

In the Greater Brisbane League 2009–10, Jay lead the league in average, batting .443 helping Redcliffe finish 3rd overall.

In 2011, Jay changed clubs in the Greater Brisbane League to the Pine Hills Lightning, where his father currently manages. Nilsson was called up to the Brisbane Bandits after Xavier Paul experienced visa problems and debuted against the Canberra Cavalry on 4 November 2011.

Jay is currently taking time out from professional baseball to focus on his growing his own business and young family.
