= Capps Medal =

South Australian Baseball League award

The Capps Medal is the medal awarded to the "best and fairest" player in the South Australian Baseball League during the regular season as decided upon by umpires. It is regarded as the most prestigious award for individual players in the league. The medal was created and designed by Charles James Capps (best known as "Jim" Capps), who presented the medal up to the 1980/1981 season. He died in January 1985. Since the 1981/1982 season, the medal has been presented by his son, Dr. Roger Capps.

== Voting process ==
At the conclusion of each game the chief umpire awards 3 votes, 2 votes and 1 vote to the players they regard as the best, second best and third best in the match respectively.

On the awards night, the votes over the home and away (regular) season are tallied and the eligible player or players with the highest number of votes is awarded the medal.

== Recipients ==
The first recipient of the Capps Medal was Charlie Puckett in 1936.

Fourteen recipients have won the Capps Medal on more than one occasion. Both Don Rice and Greg Elkson are five-time Capps Medalists.

Capps Medal Recipients
Year	Player	Team
2025/26	Harry Deliyannis (i)	East Torrens
2024/25	Samuel Steigert (i)	Port Adelaide
2023/24	Drew Janssen	Woodville
2022/23	William "Billy" Damon (i)	Adelaide
2021/22	Jackson Brebner-Russ	Sturt
2020/21	Landon Hernandez	Henley & Grange
2019/20	Chase Cunningham	Kensington
2018/19	Wilson Lee	Sturt
2017/18	Dylan Brammer	Port Adelaide
2016/17	Dylan Brammer	Port Adelaide
2015/16	Wes Roemer (i)	Glenelg
2014/15	Nick Talbot	Kensington
2013/14	Andrew Davis (i)	Port Adelaide
2012/13	Nick Talbot	Kensington
2011/12	Nick Talbot	Kensington
2010/11	Todd Langman	Port Adelaide
2009/10	Daniel Wilson	Glenelg
2008/09	Tyler Levin (i)	East Torrens
2007/08	Michael Ewart	Kensington
2006/07	Andrew Scott	West Torrens
2005/06	Darren Fidge	Goodwood
2004/05	John Challinor	Goodwood
2003/04	Darren Fidge	Goodwood
2002/03	Darren Fidge	Goodwood
2001/02	Ryan Simunsen	Adelaide
2000/01	John Challinor	Goodwood
1999/2000	Craig Watts	Sturt
1998/99	Scott Marshall	Port Adelaide
1997/98	Scott Marshall	Port Adelaide
1996/97	Mark Born	Port Adelaide
1995/96	Ian Reval	Glenelg
1994/95	Russell Dart	Henley & Grange
1993/94	Phil Burgess	West Torrens
1992/93	Barry Lunnon	Sturt
1991/92	Barry Lunnon	Sturt
1990/91	Brian Cakebread	Port Adelaide
1989/90	Greg Elkson	Goodwood
1988/89	Brian Farley (i) Barry Lunnon	Central Districts Sturt
1987/88	Greg Elkson Brian Farley (i)	Goodwood Central Districts
1986/87	Tony Harris	Woodville
1985/86	John Feichtner (i)	Kensington
1984/85	John Feichtner (i)	Kensington
1983/84	Greg Elkson	Glenelg
1982/83	Greg Elkson	Glenelg
1981/82	Phil Alexander	Glenelg
1980/81	Gary Challen*	Henley & Grange
1979/80	John Galloway	Woodville
1978/79	Greg Elkson	Glenelg
1977/78	Mark Peters	Woodville
1976/77	Don Masters	Northern Districts
1975/76	Kevin Greatrex	Port Adelaide
1974/75	Colin Alexander	Glenelg
1973/74	Neil Page Les Behrendt	Goodwood Woodville
1972/73	Kevin Greatrex	Port Adelaide
1971/72	David Mundy	Port Adelaide
1970/71	Kevin Greatrex	Port Adelaide
1969/70	David McCloud	Goodwood
1968/69	Ron Chandler	Adelaide
1968	Don Rice* David Hutton	Glenelg Sturt
1967	Don Rice*	Glenelg
1966	Kevin Greatrex	Port Adelaide
1965	Neil Davey	Port Adelaide
1964	Ian Glover	Kensington
1963	Don Rice*	Glenelg
1962	Don Rice*	Glenelg
1961	Don Rice*	Glenelg
1960	Jim Cocks*	Sturt
1959	Jim Tamlin	West Torrens
1958	Peter Box	Goodwood
1957	Peter Box	Goodwood
1956	Doug Othams	University
1955	Phil Brideoake*	Glenelg
1954	Des Vaughton*	Adelaide
1953	Colin Watts	Glenelg
1952	Doug Othams	University
1951	Bill Fuller	Kensington
1950	Barry Wiles*	Adelaide
1949	Ian Leahy*	Prospect
1948	Phil Brideoake*	West Torrens
1947	Phil Brideoake*	West Torrens
1946	Jim Puckett*	Prospect
1941	Garth Burton*	Kensington
1940	Fred Catt*	Sturt
1939	Phil Brideoake*	West Torrens
1938	Geff Noblet*	Glenelg
1937	Clem Scott*	Goodwood
1936	Charlie Puckett*	Prospect

(i) = Import (Non-National)

(*) = Deceased player
