= Bob Nilsson =

Australian baseball player (born 1960)

- Born: 23 February 1960; Brisbane, Queensland
- Bats: Left Throws: Right

Member of the Australian

Baseball Hall of Fame
- Induction: 2005

Robert "Bob" Nilsson was the oldest of the four Nilsson brothers and one of the greatest relievers in the history of Australian baseball leagues. Bob's brother Dave Nilsson was the first Australian All-Star in MLB, his brother Gary Nilsson played in the minors and Ron Nilsson also played in Australia for one year. Bob's son Jay Nilsson began his minor league career in 2006.

Bob Nilsson was the first Australian of the modern era to sign a professional contract with an MLB team, inking a deal with the Cincinnati Reds in 1978. He never made it to the US minor leagues, though.

== Playing history ==
When the Australian Baseball League was founded in 1989–1990, Bob was one of the early stars. He hit .315/.351/.575 for the Gold Coast Dolphins while going 3–4 with 2 saves and a 1.11 ERA. He was named to the ABL All-Star team as the top relief pitcher.

In 1990–1991, Nilsson went 7–0 with 7 saves and a minuscule 0.27 ERA for the Daikyo Dolphins. He saved more than twice as many games as the runners-up, who included Tim Worrell. He again would have easily led the ABL in ERA had he qualified. He also tied for third in victories. He was named to his second straight All-Star team.

Nilsson fell to 2–3 with 10 saves and a 2.68 ERA in 1991–1992. He led the league with 23 appearances and was one save behind leader Mark Ettles. He was the second team All-Star reliever this time, trailing Ettles. He helped Daikyo to a title.

He had his worst year in 1992–1993, going 3–1 with 9 saves and a 5.08 ERA for the Brisbane Bandits and allowing a .327 average. He was second to Ross Jones in saves and led the league with 26 appearances.

With the East Coast Cougars in 1993–1994, Bob's record was 0–3 with 7 saves and a 3.51 ERA. He was second to Jones in saves and was again a second-team All-Star pick.

In 1994–1995, Nilsson went 6–4 with 8 saves and a 3.98 ERA for East Coast. He was third in the league with 24 games pitched and second in saves, one behind Jones. He was the first-team All-Star relief pitcher for the third time in his six seasons.

Nilsson was 4–4 with 4 saves and a 4.98 ERA in the 1995–1996 Australian Baseball League. He made 18 appearances, tied for second in the league, and was 4th in saves. In 1996–1997, Bob was 4–3 with 2 saves and a 5.01 ERA. He tied for fourth in the ABL with 21 appearances. In the 1997 Intercontinental Cup, he had a 4.76 ERA in four appearances for the national team. Only Ettles showed up more frequently on the mound for Australia in that competition.

Nilsson's record in 1997–1998 read 5–3, 4 Sv, 4.78. He led the ABL with 27 games pitched. Bob retired after that season.

Overall, Nilsson was 34–25 with 53 saves and a 3.51 ERA in 194 games pitched in eight ABL seasons. Through 2006–2007, he ranks 8th in the history of Australian leagues in ERA (right behind Shayne Bennett), 15th in innings pitched (328, despite only 8 starts), first in games pitched (194, 33 ahead of Grahame Cassel), 6th in wins, tied for 9th in losses and first in saves (10 ahead of Jones).

== Post-career ==
Bob's sons Jay and Ryan as well as nephew Daniel play for the Redcliffe Padres. Since his professional baseball career, Bob has become a Level 2 National Accredited Coach and has coached Australian junior baseball teams, the Queensland Rams as well as other Queensland junior baseball teams and is the current head coach for the Pine Hills Lightning.
