= Redcliffe Padres =

Redcliffe Leagues Padres
- Logo

Information
- League: Greater Brisbane League (Northside)
- Location: Kippa-Ring, Queensland
- Ballpark: Talobilla Park
- Founded: 1991
- League championships: Commissioners Cup 2007–2008 Commissioners Cup 2008–2009
- Former name: Peninsula Padres, Redcliffe & PCYC Baseball Clubs
- Former ballpark(s): Frawley Fields, Dalton Park, Dolphin Oval, Redcliffe Showgrounds
- Colors: Red, white and grey

Current uniforms
Current	Old

The Redcliffe Leagues Padres Baseball Club, also known as Peninsula Padres Baseball Club, is a baseball club located in Redcliffe, Queensland that participates in the Greater Brisbane League competition and Brisbane North Region competition. As of November 2011, it was the largest club in Queensland and second largest in Australia behind the Waverley Baseball Club in Victoria.

As of the 2011–12 season, the club fields a team in every age group of the Greater Brisbane League from Under 8 to Under 20, as well as seven senior teams including an Over 35 Master's team. On 9 December 2008 it was named by the Australian Baseball Federation as the Club of the Year.

== History ==
Redcliffe Baseball club was founded as a senior club in 1948 by an American ex-serviceman named Chuck Carroll and was later named the Redcliffe Whitesox. Younger kids played at Redcliffe Police Citizens Youth Club then went elsewhere if they wanted to go on. Redcliffe Baseball Club had no direct feeder clubs from junior PCYC. In 1991 the PCYC could not support baseball anymore and the seniors wanted feeder clubs to support them so they joined forces at the Silcock Street oval and named themselves the Peninsula Padres – based on the San Diego Padres.

In the first year there were 7 teams in total. They needed a home run fence which they did not have at Silcock Street and could not put up. Council therefore asked them to relocate to the Redcliffe Showgrounds in 1996. The club had to take the fences down at showtime and then adjust the grounds after the show to make it suitable for baseball again. However, a big plus was the great light facility on the grounds. With greater promotion and a new facility, the move paid off with a boom and a resurgence of interest in baseball. Within a year at the Showgrounds there were 16 teams.

In 2003–2004 the Council offered Talobilla Park as an option. Touch football had rejected Council's suggestion so baseball and softball worked together to establish these sports in a permanent setting. The council, Queensland Government and the club used money to put in irrigation, back nets, turf and ancillary fixtures etc. to make the move possible. Also shipped in, was the old Redcliffe golf-club pro shop which is used for a canteen and meeting house. The move caused yet another resurgence and the club has now grown to 22 teams with about 225 players not to mention countless volunteers, coaches and administrators involved with the club. Padres is now the biggest club in Queensland, as well as second largest in Australia.

=== 2000–2001: Modern Major A ===
In 2000, Baseball Queensland decided to make the Major A competition a wooden bat league and the Redcliffe Major A team led by Scott Brockie struggled to adjust to the change and finished mid-table. However, both Major B and C grade were finalists. The club fielded eleven junior teams and three senior teams and won its first ever Brisbane North premiership in the U12 age group.

=== 2001–2002: Triumphant Padres ===
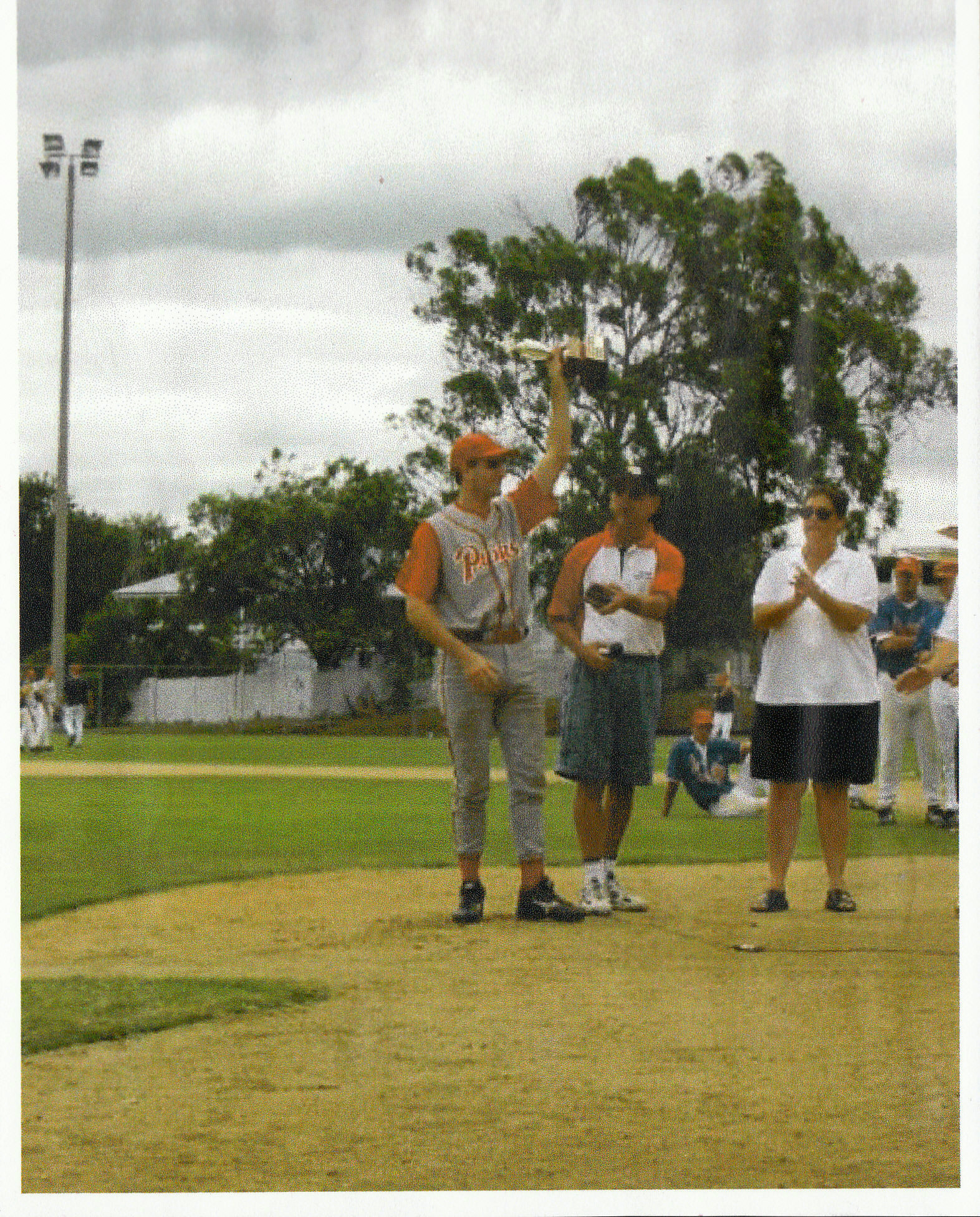
Geoff Sharpe holds the B-Grade trophy at Holloway Field

The 2001–2002 season was the most successful year since the club had been formed ten years ago, with President Terry King and A-Grade coaches Phil Schramm and Glen Brockie, two premierships were won in both Major B (second division) and Minor A (fourth division). The club fielded four senior and sixteen junior teams, making it the largest club in Queensland that year. Before the start of the season, the club's storage shed, a chicken shed used for the local Redcliffe Show, was set on fire by an arsonist with the club losing all but a single junior kitbag. That season the club also improved facilities at Redcliffe Showgrounds were the club was based by adding netting to the batting cages and having a PA system installed. The club was awarded four Greater Brisbane League semi-finals and the Northside junior grand finals.

=== 2002–2003: A Growing Club ===
By the start of the season, the club had increased their numbers to six senior teams and twenty junior teams on the back of a heavy push in recruiting and opening of a Redcliffe schools competition. With a change of hands of club presidents to Keith Land, the club reigned as the largest club in Queensland and was named as the "Redcliffe Leagues Club Leading Edge Club of the Year". The year also came with news of moving to a new grounds at Talobilla Park by the 2004–2005 season. The club was awarded six Greater Brisbane League semi-finals and three grand finals as well as the North preliminary finals. In addition the Queensland Academy of Sport used the fields for training as well as the Queensland Under 23 and regional teams. The season marked all Major league teams making the finals as well as the club's first official Canadian import, Cav Whitely. The club also set a Greater Brisbane League record in Major C, defeating Toowoomba Rangers 42–0.

=== 2003–2004: Last at Showgrounds ===
Much of the focus of the season was off the field as the club prepared for a move to their new grounds at Talobilla Park by securing government and council grants. The club had a small decrease in size as it went down to six senior teams and seventeen junior teams, yet only managed to secure an U12 premiership. The Major C team also came close to breaking its own Greater Brisbane League record when they defeated Narangba Demons 41–1 to become minor premiers.

=== 2007–2008: A-Grade Success ===
The 2007–2008 proved to be the most successful one in history for the Redcliffe Padres Major A team as they won the Commissioners Cup and finished 3rd overall in the regular season standings of the Greater Brisbane League with teams stats of a win percentage of .656, batting average of .256, ERA of 4.46 and fielding average of .936. Success in the 2007–2008 season was mostly on the back of Canadian import Brett Murray who finished the season with an ERA of 2.42 and 122 strikeouts over the course of 104.1 innings and an 11–3 pitching record, highest in the league. Brett also contributed with the bat collecting 38 hits, including 11 doubles in the season. Steven Greer was a surprise representative for the Queensland Rams team that year along with Jay Nilsson and coach Bob Nilsson, Steven led the team with runs scored (30) and bases stolen (18 from 19 attempts), this capped off a fine Claxton Shield performance from previously unknown Steven Greer with 3/6 in two games including 3 RBIs. Phil Schramm also had a high season with an OB% of .480 in 19 games including 4 saves. Schramm also led the league in hit by pitch balls, an astounding 16 times.

The team had some success after qualifying for the post season, winning their semi-final series 2–0. However, the grand final series against Runcorn Indians proved to be difficult as import and starting pitcher Brett Murray's visa expired before the series could commence. A defensively weak Padres team lost the series convincingly 2–0 to be the Greater Brisbane League runners up.

=== 2008–2009: Australian Club of the Year ===
The A-Grade team looked promising with two new Canadian imports, Devon Franklin and Brandon Hunter as well as a couple of new senior players, including the return of ex Queensland Rams pitcher Brian Debert. On top of the collection of new senior players, the A-Grade team would also see the emergence of eligible U18 players such as Queensland U18 pitcher, Lucas Bakker.

The team got off to a shaky start making 18 errors and only one win in their first four games, but managed to notch wins against all three Brisbane Metro teams in as many weeks following. However, the club's A-Grade success was dampened by announcement of Canadian Devon Franklin that he would be leaving Australia early to go home before Christmas.

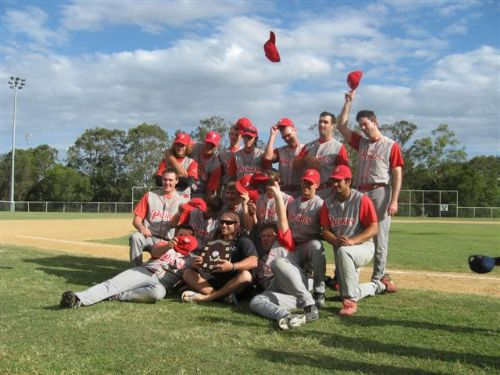
Padres with the Commissioner's Shield

At the Christmas break, Padres was awarded the opportunity to play in the second consecutive A-Grade Commissioners Cup, with coach Bob Nilsson and center fielder Stephen Greer away after being called up to the Queensland Rams squad. The team played Surfers Paradise on 21 December at Beenleigh Hawks baseball ground and retained the shield under coach and Nilsson brother, Ron Nilsson. The game was won 4–3 with Brian Debert pitching 8 innings.

The A-Grade team looked like they were going to cement a 2nd-place finish on the Northside until a horror run in March. Apart from the a two-game sweep against All-Stars, where A-Grade veteran Danny Dunsdon became the first player to play 400 games for the club, the team lost their four remaining games against Windsor and Pine Rivers meaning the team only scraped into the finals with the 2nd wildcard. They would face off against Pine Hills Lightning in the semi-finals but lost to an opposition with far more momentum going into the finals in the 3rd game of a best-of-three series.

The B-Grade team also had a horror run in the second half of the season, dropping them from equal 3rd at the end of the year to 8th by the end of the season. This horror run was not assisted by a mid-season injury to pitcher William Preinke who broke his arm while pitching.

Major C, Minor A and Minor C enjoyed finals baseball as well, but neither grades managed to qualify for the final. Indeed, the only premiership for the club would be the U16 Division 1 team, who also won the minor premiership that year.

On 9 December 2008, the club was named by the Australian Baseball Federation as the 2009 Baseball Club of the Year along with the Doncaster Baseball Club in Victoria, the largest club in Australia. In May, the club was also awarded Baseball Queensland junior club of the year as well as Sally West being awarded Volunteer of the Year.

=== 2009–10 season: Major A Minor Premiers ===
The Greater Brisbane League 2009-10 season commenced late September in 2009 and is an important one for the club as a new Greater Brisbane League format will be introduced with the Major A and Major B split into two divisions as well as a Masters competition being run by Baseball Queensland. The season saw the introduction of teams from Carina and Toowoomba back into the Majors.

On 2 July, the club announced its new A-Grade coach as Todd Fairbrother, an ex Daikyo Dolphins and Queensland Rams player and coach to replace retired Bob Nilsson. Bob, however, soon returned to coach the B-Grade team and helped manage the A's.

The club finished 5th overall after the qualifying rounds with a 9–5 record, placing them in the top eight and qualifying for the Queensland Major League. Although the team started strong in the qualifying round, the team dropped four straight games including one run losses to Wests and Beenleigh Hawks, but finished strong with the return of Rodney Wodson from overseas, winning six from their last seven.

After the preliminary rounds, the B-Grade team, by finishing 2nd, qualified for the Commissioners Shield and defeated Windsor 7–6 for the club's third successive Commissioners Shield trophy. With expanded rosters for the 2010 Claxton Shield, four players were named in the active 19-man roster; Carlos Prichard, Steven Greer, Rodney Wodson and Jay Nilsson.

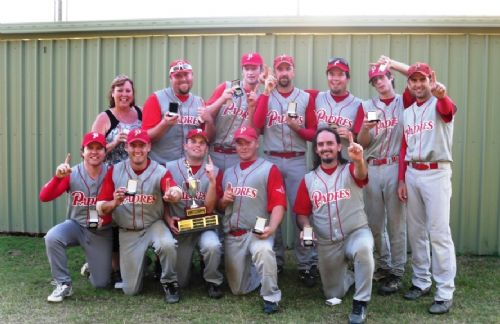
Inaugural SQBL A Premiers

The club's regular season was the best ever for a Redcliffe A-Grade team, finishing with a 14–4 record securing the minor premiership and top seed for the finals. The team included Jay Nilsson leading the league in batting average (.443) and Rodney Wodson leading the league in ERA (1.77). It was also the first season of Daniel Nilsson who represented Australia in the 2009 World Youth Baseball Championship before the season and managed to hit a home run in his debut at bat.

The finals run was less than ideal for A-Grade who went down to Windsor in three games (6–5, 5–6, 5–6) in the semi-final and Wests (9–0, 9–18, 2–8) in the preliminary final. Wests went on to beat Windsor for the premiership. The only successful team in the season being the SQBL A team who defeated Pine Hills 11–4.

=== 2010–11 season ===
With the departure of Bob Nilsson, Phil Overlack joined Todd Fairbrother at the helm of the A-Grade squad. The team qualified for Major League, but missed out on finals by 1 win. The 7–9 Pine Hills Lightning would go on to defeat the 16–2 Windsor Royals in A-Grade that year.

All other grades qualified for the finals, with Major B bowing out in the preliminary final, SQBL A losing their grand final by 1 run in the final inning, SQBL B winning the premiership and SQBL C scraping into the semi-finals, but getting thoroughly defeated.

== Uniform ==
As of the 2009–2010 season, there are two uniforms used, one for U8's to Little League (U12) and one for U14's up. The junior uniform is a singular grey T-shirt with red 3/4 sleeves and drawstring, belt-less grey pants. The senior uniform is a red undershirt with red piping around the neck and down either side of the front buttons and "Padres" in red letters outlined in white arched across the chest. Players also get to choose a personal number between 1–99 that is displayed on the back of their overshirt in large red block numbers with white outline. Pants are like juniors except they are button-up grey pants with red piping and a red belt. Both the juniors and seniors wear red socks and the Padres cap is red with a stylised 'P' for Padres, very similar to the Philadelphia Phillies cap insignia.

While the Redcliffe Baseball Club was known as the 'Whitesox' from 1951 till 1973. The uniform was a black undershirt and overshirt with white trim sleeves. On the right middle side of the shirt was the word "SOX" in an Old English font, diagonally arranged. The cap was white with black brim and the SOX logo printed diagonally across it. Pants were plain white with a black belt and socks.

The first Peninsula Padres uniform was worn between 1992 and 1995 uniforms were a red 3/4 length sleeved undershirt and a white bodied, red pin striped T-shirt styled overshirt with "Padres" arched across the chest. Pants were white, also with red pinstripe, instead of the current grey and socks were white with red trimmed sides. The cap was primary red with the insignia a red oblate 'P' cutting into an upside white oblate 'P' to form a square. The juniors wore a plain white uniform with a red collar trim and "Padres" in red arched across the chest. Pants were plain white with a red pipe down the outer leg sides. Plain white socks were also worn. Insignia was on the right sleeve of both uniforms.

In the 1995–1996 season the red undershirt was reduced to a T-shirt size and only visible above the overshirts collar. The hat insignia was changed to the stylised 'P' and sock colour was reversed so that socks were now primarily red with white foot and side trim. Juniors were changed to a red instead of white base to the uniform and the word "Padres" was changed to white.

The modern uniform was first issued at the start of the 1999 season. The overshirt was changed to the grey base with red piping and sleeves shortened so the undershirt was visible and pants were changed to grey with red piping. Also the socks changed to a plain red. The cap changed slight as the 'P' was thinned, giving a more stylistic look. In the 2002–2003 season, the Major A team wore a black undershirt and socks, as well as a black with red brimmed cap instead of the traditional red for night games played on a Friday night. The night uniform was scrapped by 2004 and the singular uniform for all senior teams returned.

== Current season ==
The current season has seen a major reshuffling in the A-Grade playing roster with longtime Padres players Jay Nilsson, Ryan Nilsson and Steve Greer all opting to join Bob Nilsson at Pine Hills Lightning. The club also lost pitcher Rodney Wodson to Pine Hills, Brian Debert to All-Stars, Shannon Mills to Windsor Royals as well as Lucas Bakker and Jake Pannunzio to college. To fill the player drain, the club added imports Jeff Tezak and Kevin Hoef from the United States. Also returning from college was Nathan Corscadden and Greg Johnston as well as the debuts of Australian junior representatives Sam Holland and Mike Young.

The club qualified in 5th position after the first half of the season for Major League.

== School competition ==
In 2002, members from the Redcliffe committee succeeded in creating a primary schools baseball competition on the Redcliffe Peninsula in Queensland to be created alongside other summer sports such as cricket and softball. This included teams from Humpybong, Scarborough, Kippa-Ring, Hercules Road, Southern Cross and Grace Lutheran primary schools who play during their Friday afternoon sport at Talobilla Park. In 2009, this competition had a total of 16 teams and is the backbone to recruiting juniors in Redcliffe, making baseball more popular than cricket in Redcliffe.

== Media coverage ==
The Redcliffe and Bayside Herald as well as many other regional and Quest Community Newspapers and the now defunct Peninsula Post, have been publishing articles and results about the Padres since its inception. Since the 2006–2007 season however, articles have become more in depth as the club has become recognised as one of Redcliffe's top sporting clubs. The club is also covered by online newspaper Redcliffe City News. Major League results are also covered by the television network 7 and more in depth results are covered by The Sunday Mail and The Courier Mail as of the 2008–2009 season.

== Records ==
Notable individual records set in one game, these include all games between the 1992–1993 season to present from grades Under 16 Division 2 to Major A. Where tied, the higher grade is awarded the record.

	Record	Holder	Grade	Year
Most Safe Hits	7	Darren Hartland	Major C	2002–2003
Most Home Runs	3	Steve Rixon	Under 16 Div 1	1995–1996
Most Stolen Bases	6	Geoff Wade	Major C	1995–1996
Most Put Outs	20	Craig Cox	Major A	2001–2002
Most Errors	5	Mitchell Hatfield; Phillip Schramm	Major A	1999–2000; 2008–2009
Most Strikeouts for	15	Brett Murray	Major A	2007–2008
Most Pitches	159	Keith Wright	Major A	1994–1995

== Notable players ==
The following players have either played for the Queensland Rams, Australia or professionally.

=== Ex-players ===
- David Nilsson – Milwaukee Brewers (1992–1999) & Chunichi Dragons (2000)
- Paul Gonzalez – Orix BlueWave (1999)
- Phil Stockman – Atlanta Braves (2006–2009)
- Bob Nilsson – Signed with Cincinnati Reds in 1978
- Alessandro Vaglio – Italian national baseball team (2010–)
- Rodney Wodson – Queensland Rams (2005–2010)
- Steven Greer – Queensland Rams (2007–2010)
- Jay Nilsson – Queensland Rams (2005–2009) & Brisbane Bandits (2011)

=== Current Representatives ===
- Todd Fairbrother – Queensland Rams (2005–2010)
- Carlos Prichard – Queensland Rams (2009)
- Jacob Reust – GCL Indians (2007–2009)
- Danny Dunsdon – Queensland Rams (2008)

== Division 1 Roster ==
Redcliffe Padres Division 1 roster – 2018–19 GBL
Active roster		Inactive Players
Pitchers Right-handed pitchers: Matthew Bates; Sam Holland; Jason Kilby; Daiki Miura; Karlin Palidwor; Kai-Noa Wynyard; Left-handed pitchers	Catchers: Jay Myers; Infielders: Jack Barrie; Drew Cusick; Josh Hobbs; Dylan Raines; Tim Shaw; Matt West; Outfielders: Carter Bell; Danny Dunsdon; Marcus Feagaiga; Jaiden Holly; Liam O'Hea; Luke Readdy; Kane Swanson	Infielders: Joel Johnson
8 February 2019

== See also ==
- Greater Brisbane League
- Baseball Queensland
