= Sports Performer Awards =

The Sports Performer Awards, supported by The Age and The Sydney Morning Herald and presented by Colonial First State, are one of the most prestigious and lucrative prizes in Australian sport, first awarded in 2007.

The major award, Sports Performer of the Year, is voted by the public from a shortlist of 6-7 nominees selected by a panel. The winner is awarded $50,000 from Colonial First State.

In addition to the major award, Sports Performer of the Year, three other awards are presented on the night — for team, coach and young performer of the year. By voting for any of the awards presented on the night you can win $5,000 from Colonial First State.

The 2007 Performer of the Year was Cadel Evans. The 2008 winner was Olympic diving goldmedalist Matthew Mitcham.

== Major Award ==
- Sports Performer of the Year

== Other awards ==
- Team of the Year
- Coach of the Year
- Young Performer of the Year

== See also ==
- Australian Sport Awards
