= Coomera Cubs Baseball Club =

Baseball club in Queensland, Australia

- Logo

Information
- League: GBL and GCBA
- Location: Oxenford, Australia
- Ballpark: Gambamora Park
- Founded: 2006; 20 years ago
- Nickname: Cubs
- 2025–26 Season Record: 22–9
- Former name: Coomera Cougars
- Colors: Purple and Teal
- Ownership: Nick Day
- President: Nick Day
- Manager: Case Bunting
- Website: www.coomera.baseball.com.au

Current uniforms
| Home | Away |

The Coomera Cubs Baseball Club is a baseball club located on the Gold Coast in Queensland, that participates in the Greater Brisbane League and the Gold Coast Baseball Association League. The club is also a host to the annual Summer Classic.

== History ==
The club has a history dating back to the 1990s and was originally known as the Coomera Cougars. The club shared playing fields on the eastern side of the M1 where the Coomera Soccer fields now reside. The club was moved in the early 2000s to the current site at Gambamora Park and was officially incorporated in 2006 as the Coomera Cubs Baseball Club Inc. That year the club entered multiple Junior and Senior teams in the Gold Coast Baseball Association competition.

== GBL ==
In 2017/18 the club entered into the Senior Div 1, Div 2, U16 Div 1 and U14 Div1 GBL competition for the first time. The following year saw the U16 team make the grand final and the U14 team win the championship. 2019/20 in the third year of the GBL senior competition the Senior Div 1 and Div 2 both made the playoffs. The Div 2 side sitting equal top of the table after the regular season on for and against and narrowly losing to Surfers on head to head results for the minor premiership.

In what can only be described as unprecedented times the season finals series were not played due to the COVID-19 pandemic. As a result, the competition was awarded based on placings during the regular season. Div 1 came 4th and Div 2 came 2nd.

== Junior Baseball Academy ==
In 2013 the club introduced the first club based junior elite academy on the Gold Coast. This academy is aimed at 10 to 14 year olds and in 2019 was run inhouse at the club by the team at South Coast Academy of Sport. The academy continues to support the club's training activities.

== Little League ==
In 2018 there was a large representation from the club that represented the Gold Coast at the Little League District State Titles. This Gold Coast team became the first team from Queensland to win National Little League Australian Championships in June 2018 and progress to the Little League World series.

== Notable players ==
Aaron Whitefield (Minnesota Twins, Los Angeles Angels) signed but did not play*

Josh Warner (Philadelphia Phillies)

Darren Trainor (Lewis-Clark State College)

Jack Waters (Arizona Western College)

Liam Sherer (Canberra Cavalry, Colby Trojans)

Shotaro Usui (Mid East Falcons)

== Records ==
Notable individual records set in one game, these include all games between the 2020–2021 season from Div 1 and 2

| | Record | Holder | Grade | Year |
|---|---|---|---|---|
| Most Strikeouts | 19 | Jack Waters | Div 1 | 2020–2021 |

=== Single Season Records ===
Notable individual records set in one season, these only include all games between the 2024–2025 season and now from Div 1.

=== Hitting Records ===
Current Hitting Records Set In A Season for the Coomera Cubs GBL Division 1 Team

| | Statistic | Holder | Season |
|---|---|---|---|
| AVG | .430 | Zackery Calicetto | 2024-2025 |
| OBP | .507 | Aaron Marsh | 2025-2026 |
| OPS | 1.226 | Aaron Marsh | 2025-2026 |
| Hits | 44 | Aaron Marsh | 2025-2026 |
| Doubles | 15 | Aaron Marsh | 2025-2026 |
| Triples | 3 | Shotaro Usui | 2024-2025 |
| Homeruns | 6 | Aaron Marsh | 2025-2026 |
| RBI | 40 | Aaron Marsh | 2025-2026 |
| Walks | 22 | Yusei Teraoka | 2025-2026 |
| Plate Appearance | 148 | Shotaro Usui | 2024-2025 |
| At Bats | 122 | Shotaro Usui | 2024-2025 |
| Stolen Base | 27 | Shotaro Usui | 2024-2025 |

=== Pitching Records ===
Current Pitching Records Set In A Season for the Coomera Cubs GBL Division 1 Team

| | Statistic | Holder | Season |
|---|---|---|---|
| Innings Pitched | 67.1 | Jake Muscat | 2024-2025 |
| ERA | 2.59 | Ryan Searle | 2025-2026 |
| Strikeouts | 94 | Ryan Searle | 2025-2026 |
| Wins | 9 | Ryan Searle | 2025-2026 |
| Losses | 5 | Patrick Day, Rui Narasaki | 2024-2025 |
| Saves | 3 | Noah Zenkewich | 2025-2026 |

== Current Statistical Leaders ==
=== Hitting Leaders ===
Current Statistical Hitting Leaders of the 2025-2026 GBL Season

| | Statistic | Holder | Grade | League Position |
|---|---|---|---|---|
| AVG | .400 | Aaron Marsh | Div 1 | 6th |
| OBP | .507 | Aaron Marsh | Div 1 | 7th |
| OPS | 1.226 | Aaron Marsh | Div 1 | 4th |
| Hits | 44 | Aaron Marsh | Div 1 | 3rd |
| Doubles | 15 | Aaron Marsh | Div 1 | 1st |
| Triples | 2 | JD Tibbs | Div 1 | T-3rd |
| Homeruns | 6 | Aaron Marsh | Div 1 | T-3rd |
| RBI | 40 | Aaron Marsh | Div 1 | 2nd |
| Walks | 22 | Yusei Teraoka | Div 1 | T-5th |
| Plate Appearance | 136 | Aaron Marsh | Div 1 | 4th |
| At Bats | 110 | Aaron Marsh | Div 1 | 4th |
| Stolen Base | 19 | Yusei Teraoka | Div 1 | 4th |

=== Pitching Leaders ===
Current Statistical Pitching Leaders of the 2025-2026 GBL Season

| | Statistic | Holder | Grade | League Position |
|---|---|---|---|---|
| Innings Pitched | 66.0 | Ryan Searle | Div 1 | 8th |
| ERA | 2.59 | Ryan Searle | Div 1 | 7th |
| Strikeouts | 94 | Ryan Searle | Div 1 | 3rd |
| Wins | 9 | Ryan Searle | Div 1 | N/a |
| Losses | 2 | Patrick Day, Ryan Searle, Noah Zenkewich | Div 1 | N/a |
| Saves | 3 | Noah Zenkewich | Div 1 | N/a |

== Top 5 Team Leaders 2024-Present ==
=== Top 5 Hitting Leaders ===
Current Statistical Hitting Leaders of the 2024-2025 GBL Season Players Must Have Minimum 15 Plate Appearances For the Cubs

*Denotes Leads the League

| | Statistic | Holder | Grade | Team Position |
|---|---|---|---|---|
| AVG | .571 | Riley Cooper | Div 1 | 1st |
| | .465 | Zackery Calicetto | Div 1 | 2nd |
| | .364 | Shotaro Usui | Div 1 | 3rd |
| | .318 | Takashi Mizuno | Div 1 | 4th |
| | .270 | Kokoro Aomatsu | Div 1 | 5th |

| | Statistic | Holder | Grade | Team Position |
|---|---|---|---|---|
| OBP | .700 | Riley Cooper | Div 1 | 1st |
| | .540 | Zackery Calicetto | Div 1 | 2nd |
| | .444 | Shotaro Usui | Div 1 | 3rd |
| | .400 | Jack Huawai | Div 1 | T-4th |
| | .400 | Thomas Ryan | Div 1 | T-4th |

| | Statistic | Holder | Grade | Team Position |
|---|---|---|---|---|
| OPS | 1.462 | Riley Cooper | Div 1 | 1st |
| | 1.098 | Zackery Calicetto | Div 1 | 2nd |
| | 1.081 | Shotaro Usui | Div 1 | 3rd |
| | .757 | Takashi Mizuno | Div 1 | 4th |
| | .746 | Kokoro Aomatsu | Div 1 | 5th |

| | Statistic | Holder | Grade | Team Position |
|---|---|---|---|---|
| Hits | 20 | Zackery Calicetto | Div 1 | T-1st |
| | 20 | Shotaro Usui | Div 1 | T-1st |
| | 12 | Riley Cooper | Div 1 | 2nd |
| | 11 | Rui Narasaki | Div 1 | 3rd |
| | 10 | Kokoro Aomatsu | Div 1 | 4th |

| | Statistic | Holder | Grade | Team Position |
|---|---|---|---|---|
| Doubles | 5 | Shotaro Usui | Div 1 | T-1st |
| | 5 | Kokoro Aomatsu | Div 1 | T-1st |
| | 4 | Riley Cooper | Div 1 | T-2nd |
| | 4 | Rui Narasaki | Div 1 | T-2nd |
| | 2 | Liam Kiddle | Div 1 | T-3rd |

| | Statistic | Holder | Grade | Team Position |
|---|---|---|---|---|
| Triples | 2 | Shotaro Usui* | Div 1 | 1st |
| | 1 | Zackery Calicetto | Div 1 | 2nd |

| | Statistic | Holder | Grade | Team Position |
|---|---|---|---|---|
| Homeruns | 2 | Shotaro Usui | Div 1 | 1st |
| | 1 | Kent Ward | Div 1 | T-2nd |
| | 1 | Liam Kiddle | Div 1 | T-2nd |
| | 1 | Nick Battese | Div 1 | T-2nd |

| | Statistic | Holder | Grade | Team Position |
|---|---|---|---|---|
| RBIs | 15 | Kokoro Aomatsu | Div 1 | 1st |
| | 10 | Rui Narasaki | Div 1 | 2nd |
| | 7 | Shotaro Usui | Div 1 | T-3rd |
| | 7 | Liam Kiddle | Div 1 | T-3rd |
| | 7 | Zackery Calicetto | Div 1 | T-3rd |

| | Statistic | Holder | Grade | Team Position |
|---|---|---|---|---|
| Walks | 9 | Nick Hawkins | Div 1 | 1st |
| | 8 | Jack Huawai | Div 1 | 2nd |
| | 7 | Zackery Calicetto | Div 1 | 3rd |
| | 6 | Rui Narasaki | Div 1 | T-4th |
| | 6 | Riley Cooper | Div 1 | T-4th |

| | Statistic | Holder | Grade | Team Position |
|---|---|---|---|---|
| Stolen bases | 13 | Shotaro Usui | Div 1 | 1st |
| | 9 | Zackery Calicetto | Div 1 | 2nd |
| | 7 | Riley Cooper | Div 1 | 3rd |
| | 5 | Kokoro Aomatsu | Div 1 | 4th |
| | 4 | Nick Battese | Div 1 | 5th |

=== Top 5 Pitching Leaders ===
Current Statistical Pitching Leaders of the 2024-2025 GBL Season Players Must Have Minimum 2.1 Innings Pitched For the Cubs

*Denotes Leads the League

| | Statistic | Holder | Grade | Team Position |
|---|---|---|---|---|
| IP | 36.0 | Patrick Day | Div 1 | 1st |
| | 35.0 | Jake Muscat | Div 1 | 2nd |
| | 28.0 | Rui Nakasaki | Div 1 | 3rd |
| | 7.0 | Dylan Sippel | Div 1 | 4th |
| | 4.2 | Lewis Day | Div 1 | 5th |

| | Statistic | Holder | Grade | Team Position |
|---|---|---|---|---|
| Wins | 2 | Patrick Day | Div 1 | 1st |
| | 1 | Kyle Watson | Div 1 | T-2nd |
| | 1 | Jake Muscat | Div 1 | T-2nd |
| | 1 | Rui Nakasaki | Div 1 | T-2nd |

| | Statistic | Holder | Grade | Team Position |
|---|---|---|---|---|
| Losses | 3 | Jake Muscat | Div 1 | T-1st |
| | 3 | Patrick Day | Div 1 | T-1st |
| | 3 | Rui Nakasaki | Div 1 | T-1st |
| | 1 | Dylan Sippel | Div 1 | T-2nd |
| | 1 | Jayden Battese | Div 1 | T-2nd |

| | Statistic | Holder | Grade | Team Position |
|---|---|---|---|---|
| K's | 43 | Patrick Day | Div 1 | 1st |
| | 28 | Rui Nakasaki | Div 1 | 2nd |
| | 27 | Jake Muscat | Div 1 | 3rd |
| | 7 | Dylan Sippel | Div 1 | T-4th |
| | 7 | Shotaro Usui | Div 1 | T-4th |

| | Statistic | Holder | Grade | Team Position |
|---|---|---|---|---|
| BB | 14 | Patrick Day | Div 1 | 1st |
| | 11 | Jayden Battese | Div 1 | T-2nd |
| | 10 | Rui Nakasaki | Div 1 | T-2nd |
| | 7 | Dylan Sippel | Div 1 | 4th |
| | 6 | Lewis Day | Div 1 | 5th |

| | Statistic | Holder | Grade | Team Position |
|---|---|---|---|---|
| ERA | 3.34 | Jake Muscat | Div 1 | 1st |
| | 4.82 | Rui Nakasaki | Div 1 | 2nd |
| | 5.75 | Patrick Day | Div 1 | 3rd |
| | 8.31 | Kyle Watson | Div 1 | 4th |
| | 10.29 | Dylan Sippel | Div 1 | 5th |

== Division 1 roster ==
Coomera Cubs Division 1 roster – 2025–26 GBL
| Players | | Coaches |
| Pitchers: 27 (Australia) Jayden Battese; 10 (Australia) Patrick Day; 18 (Australia) Luke Krkovski; 22 (Australia) Ryan Searle; 28 (Australia) Dylan Sippel; 8 (Canada) Noah Zenkewich | Catchers: 24 (Australia) Josh Fritsch; 26 (Australia) Jack Hauwai; 21 (New Zealand) Liam Hay; Infielders: 6 (Australia) Cooper Amiet; 14 (Australia) Nick Battese; 46 (Australia) Kynan Davis; 00 (Australia) Jet Grimmond; 1 (Canada) Aaron Marsh; 29 (Australia) Sam McNiece; 0 (Australia) Taliesin Tardrew-O'Meara; 30 (United States) JD Tibbs; 16 (Australia) Dallas Wakefield; 73 (Australia) Kent Ward; 7 (Australia) Kyle Watson; 98 (Australia) Matt Wyatt; Outfielders: 62 (Australia) Zakery Calicetto; 25 (Australia) George Cooper; 19 (Australia) Lewis Day; 45 (Australia) Aiden Maguire; 38 (Japan) Ryota Masuzawa; 23 (Australia) Connor McCarthy; 17 (Australia) Lachlan O'Sullivan; 81 (Australia) Adrian Perrin; 51 (Japan) Yusei Teraoka | Manager: 43 (Australia) Case Bunting |
Updated on 14 March 2026

== Division 2 roster ==
Coomera Cubs Division 2 roster – 2025–26 GBL
| Players | | Coaches |
| Pitchers: 27 (Australia) Jayden Battese; 19 (Australia) Lewis Day; 45 (Australia) Aiden Maguire; 23 (Australia) Connor McCarthy; 29 (Australia) Sam McNiece; 17 (Australia) Lachlan O'Sullivan; 28 (Australia) Dylan Sippel; 7 (Australia) Kyle Watson | Catchers: 43 (Australia) Case Bunting; 46 (Australia) Kynan Davis; 26 (Australia) Jack Hauwai; Infielders: 6 (Australia) Cooper Amiet; 14 (Australia) Nick Battese; 10 (Australia) Patrick Day; 00 (Australia) Jet Grimmond; 21 (New Zealand) Liam Hay; 11 (New Zealand) Jacob Reid; 73 (Australia) Kent Ward; Outfielders: 27 (Australia) Jayden Battese; 45 (Australia) Aiden Maguire; 38 (Japan) Ryota Masuzawa; 81 (Australia) Adrian Perrin; 8 (Canada) Noah Zenkewich | Manager: 43 (Australia) Case Bunting |
Updated on 14 March 2026

== GCBA D2 ==
Coomera Cubs Green roster – 2022–23 GCBA Seniors
Active roster
| Pitchers Right-handed pitchers: Paul Walberg; Lachlan Travis; Left-handed pitchers | Catchers: Garreth Constan; Infielders: Isiah Howard; Jasper King; Lincoln Thompson; Paul Walberg; Outfielders: Beau McKenzie; Cory Robinson; Dennis De Cicco |
12 October 2023

Coomera Cubs Purple roster – 2022–23 GCBA Seniors
Active roster
| Pitchers Right-handed pitchers: Lewis Day; Mitsuki Kudo; Left-handed pitchers | Catchers: Dallas Knapp; Infielders: Will Richardson; Jordan Salmon-Patrick; Lincoln Thompson; Outfielders: Noah Reynolds; Adrian Perrin; Joshua Patrick; Nathan McEwan |
16 November 2022

== Managers ==
Phil Stockman – (2018–2019)

Andrew Azzopardi – (2019–2020)

Case Bunting – (2020–2023), (2025-Present)

Michael Sharp – (2023–2025)

== Assistant Coach ==
Scott Nieass – (2019–2021)

Glen Hall – (2021–2025)

Dylan Sipple – (2023–2025) Pitching Coach

Brent Iddon – (2022–2024)

James Somerville – (2022–2024)

Dallas Knapp – (2023–2025) Hitting Coach

== Location ==
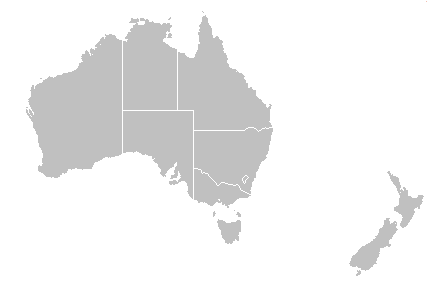
