= 1995–96 Australian Baseball League season =

The 1995–96 Australian Baseball League Championship was won by the Sydney Blues, who defeated the Melbourne Reds in 2 games (8-4 and 5–2) at the Sydney Showground.

== Ladder ==
Team	Played	Wins	Loss	Win %
Sydney Blues		28	19	
Melbourne Reds		27	21	
Perth Heat		26	20	
Brisbane Bandits		29	16	
Gold Coast Cougars		23	21	
Melbourne Monarchs		24	24	
Adelaide Giants		21	25	
Hunter Eagles		7	39	

== Championship series ==
=== Semi Final 1: Game 1: 1st Vs 4th at QE II Stadium ===
Team	1	2	3	4	5	6	7	8	9	10	11	R	H	E
Melbourne Reds	?	?	?	?	?	?	?	?	?	?	?	10	?	?
Brisbane Bandits	?	?	?	?	?	?	?	?	?	?	?	8	?	?
WP: ? (1-0) LP: ? (0-1) Sv: ? Home runs: Reds: ? Bandits: ?

=== Semi Final 1: Game 2: 1st Vs 4th at QE II Stadium ===
Team	1	2	3	4	5	6	7	8	9	10	R	H	E
Melbourne Reds	?	?	?	?	?	?	?	?	?	?	15	?	?
Brisbane Bandits	?	?	?	?	?	?	?	?	?	?	12	?	?
WP: ? (1-0) LP: ? (0-1) Sv: ? Home runs: Reds: ? Bandits: ?

=== Semi Final 2: Game 1: 2nd Vs 3rd at Sydney Showground ===
Team	1	2	3	4	5	6	7	8	9	R	H	E
Perth Heat	?	?	?	?	?	?	?	?	?	1	?	?
Sydney Blues	?	?	?	?	?	?	?	?	?	2	?	?
WP: ? (1-0) LP: ? (0-1) Sv: ? Home runs: Heat: ? Blues: ?

=== Semi Final 2: Game 2: 2nd Vs 3rd at Sydney Showground ===
Team	1	2	3	4	5	6	7	8	9	R	H	E
Perth Heat	?	?	?	?	?	?	?	?	?	?	?	?
Sydney Blues	?	?	?	?	?	?	?	?	?	?	?	?
WP: ? (1-0) LP: ? (0-1) Sv: ? Home runs: Heat: ? Blues: ?

=== Final Series: Game 1: Winner Semi Final 1 Vs Winner Semi Final 2 at Sydney Showground ===
Team	1	2	3	4	5	6	7	8	9	R	H	E
Melbourne Reds	?	?	?	?	?	?	?	?	?	4	?	?
Sydney Blues	?	?	?	?	?	?	?	?	?	8	?	?
WP: ? (1-0) LP: ? (0-1) Sv: ? Home runs: Reds: ? Blues: ?

=== Final Series: Game 2: Winner Semi Final 1 Vs Winner Semi Final 2 at Sydney Showground ===
Team	1	2	3	4	5	6	7	8	9	R	H	E
Melbourne Reds	?	?	?	?	?	?	?	?	?	2	?	?
Sydney Blues	?	?	?	?	?	?	?	?	?	5	?	?
WP: ? (1-0) LP: ? (0-1) Sv: ? Home runs: Reds: ? Blues: ?

== Awards ==
Award	Person	Team
Most Valuable Player	Gary WHITE	Sydney Blues
Championship M.V.P.	Gary WHITE	Sydney Blues
Golden Glove	Steve HINTON	Brisbane Bandits
Batting Champion	Adam BURTON	Brisbane Bandits
Pitcher of the Year	Frankie RODRIGUEZ	Brisbane Bandits
Rookie of the Year	Tom BECKER	Adelaide Giants
Manager of the Year		

== Top Stats ==
Defensive Stats
Name	Wins	Losses	Saves	ERA
Mark MARINO	5	1	2	3.40
Doug MEINERS	7	2	0	4.10
Brad THOMAS	2	0	0	2.45
Scott MITCHELL	2	0	1	3.06
Brent IDDON	2	2	0	3.61
Grahame CASSEL	2	2	7	5.12

Offensive Stars
Name	Avg	HR	RBI
Gary WHITE	.357	17	49
Matt EVERINGHAM	.344	4	18
Sharnol ADRIANA	.341	5	17
Scott TUNKIN	.328	11	30
Brendan KINGMAN	.292	9	40
Brian MURPHY	.289	7	37

== All-Star Team ==
Position	Name	Team
Catcher	Gary WHITE	Sydney Blues
1st Base	Craig WATTS	Adelaide Giants
2nd Base	Adam BURTON	Brisbane Bandits
3rd Base	Jason HEWITT	Perth Heat
Short Stop	Steve HINTON	Brisbane Bandits
Out Field	Michael DUNN	Adelaide Giants
Out Field	David HYNES	Brisbane Bandits
Out Field	Grant McDONALD	Brisbane Bandits
Designated Hitter	Scott METCALF	Perth Heat
Starting Pitcher	Frankie RODRIGUEZ	Brisbane Bandits
Relief Pitcher	Shayne BENNETT	Gold Coast Cougars
Manager	Darren BALSLEY	Sydney Blues
