= Dolphin Stadium (Brisbane) =

Stadium in Kippa-Ring, Queensland, Australia

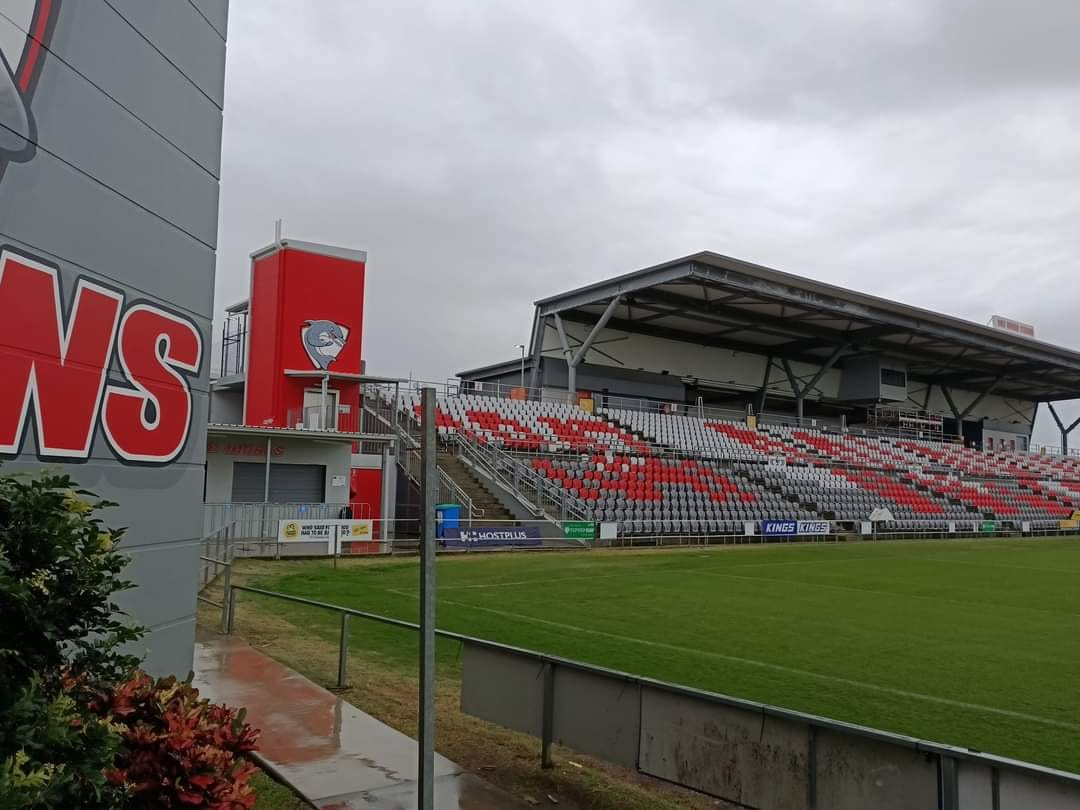
- Western side of the stadium in July 2022
- Interactive map of Dolphin Stadium
- Former names: Moreton Daily Stadium
- Location: Kippa-Ring, Queensland
- Coordinates: 27°13′8″S 153°5′50″E
- Owner: Redcliffe Dolphins
- Operator: Redcliffe Dolphins
- Capacity: 10,000 (9,420 seats)
- Surface: Grass
- Public transit: Kippa-Ring

Construction
- Groundbreaking: Late-1970s
- Opened: May 1979

Tenants
- Redcliffe Dolphins (Queensland Cup); Peninsula Power (FFA Cup); Brisbane Roar (A-League Men, 2020–2023, 2025–present); New Zealand Warriors (NRL, 2022); Dolphins, (NRL, 2023–present)

Website
- moretondailystadium.com.au

Dolphin Stadium (known under naming rights as Kayo Stadium), is a stadium located in the Moreton Bay suburb of Kippa-Ring. It is primarily used for rugby league as the secondary home ground and administrative facility of the Dolphins in the National Rugby League (NRL), as well as their reserves side the Redcliffe Dolphins in the Queensland Cup.

Built in 1979 as home stadium for the Redcliffe Dolphins, the stadium now hosts a capacity of total 10,000 spectators. Australian streaming service Kayo Sports own the naming rights to the stadium. The stadium is owned and operated by its primary tenants the Redcliffe Dolphins.

The ground regularly hosts NRL pre-season trials, some Dolphins home games in the NRL premiership season, and has been the home of the Queensland Cup grand final since 2019.

== History ==
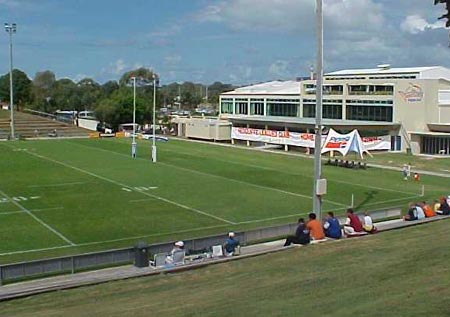
View of the Leagues Club end of the Stadium prior to redevelopment

The creation of field, formerly known as Dolphin Oval, began when the Redcliffe City Council made re-claimed land available for sporting fields in the 1970s. The Redcliffe Dolphins, who at the time were based at the Redcliffe Showgrounds, showed immediate interest and applied for the maximum area available. Redcliffe City Council engineer Kevin Tibbets took to the construction of the ground with the utmost enthusiasm, with the football club even hosting a trip interstate for him to study playing arenas in New South Wales.

The transition from the Redcliffe Showgrounds to Dolphin Oval presented some major problems. Due to the isolation of the area at the time of construction, normal services were not readily available and therefore had to be brought in. Due to the gravity flow to Klingner Road, expensive sewerage pumps had to be brought in, power for the floodlights had to go underground to the main oval and the run-through tunnel was transhipped from Western Australia at a cost of $9,000, which was still cheaper than buying one from the Eastern states.

The lighting at the showgrounds was far superior, but the Redcliffe Rugby League Old Boys, led by Neil Okamura, contributed a $5,000 loan, which was later turned into a grant, for suitable floodlighting. They also constructed a perimeter playing fence around the main oval at a cost of $2,780. In return, the football club provided the Old Boys with a solid can-booth at the northern end of the complex and were granted the rights to sell liquor on a commission basis.

The pressure to build a licensed club at Dolphin Oval was met with a great deal of caution, especially when the existing club at the Showgrounds was still profitable. But within 12 months after the sod-turning ceremony, the new clubhouse was opened by the Mayor of Redcliffe, Ald. Alf Charlish. With the help of the Federal Member for Petrie, Dean Wells, and his Government's contribution through their C.E.P. Funding, along with the football club's own financial arrangements with the Commonwealth Bank, the move was made possible.

However the heavily publicised and enforced "Don't Drink and Drive" policy by the Government struck the thriving bar trade, and, according to From Shellgrit to Dolphins, a book on the History of the Redcliffe Dolphins, says: "Suffice to say the club only barely kept its doors open and its creditors at bay until the advent of poker machines in 1992, but proudly was able to meet its financial commitments".

In January 1979, the committee proposed to name the complex the Don McLennan Oval after the club executive, but he requested that it be called Dolphin Oval.

Fittingly, the first game at Dolphin Oval was between Redcliffe and Norths, the club that originally proposed Redcliffe's admission into the BRL. The original lease was acquired to 1998 and later extended to 2008, before the Redcliffe Dolphins bought the land.

In June 2019, A-Leagues football club Brisbane Roar announced it would move three of its home matches in the 2019–20 season to the venue. The club's women's team has played high-profile home matches at the venue. In November 2019, Brisbane Roar played the first ever A-League Men game at the venue against Melbourne City, attracting a sell-out crowd of 9387. The Roar came from behind to win 4-3.

In October 2020, A-League Men side Brisbane Roar announced it would move its home matches for the 2020–21 season to the venue. For the 2023–24 season, Brisbane Roar moved back to Suncorp Stadium in Brisbane for men's games, with women's games held at Perry Park and Ballymore Stadium.

In June 2025 Brisbane Roar announced that they would play 2 Home games at Kayo Stadium during the 2025–26 Season, this ended up being increased to 3 games due to Brisbane Roar VS Perth Glory being moved to the venue due to a schedule conflict at Suncorp Stadium

During the 2021 NRL season, all teams moved temporarily to Queensland due to COVID-19 outbreaks in Sydney and Melbourne. A round 20 match between Cronulla Sharks and Manly-Warringah Sea Eagles and a round 21 match between Canterbury-Bankstown Bulldogs and Wests Tigers, played on consecutive Sundays, were scheduled to be played at the stadium. However due to a snap lockdown, these were once again relocated to Suncorp Stadium. Subsequently, the stadium hosted its first NRL matches in round 22, when it hosted a double-header with New Zealand Warriors vs Canterbury-Bankstown Bulldogs, followed by Cronulla Sharks vs Newcastle Knights, on 15 August 2021.

In September 2021, the New Zealand Warriors confirmed that they'll use the stadium as a temporary home base for at least the first half of the 2022 NRL season due to uncertainties regarding quarantine free travel between Australia and New Zealand as a result of the COVID-19 pandemic.

On 10 April 2022, the stadium hosted 2021 NRLW Grand Final between the St George Illawarra Dragons and the Sydney Roosters, the first NRLW Grand Final to be held outside of Sydney.

== Redevelopment and renaming ==
The ground was redeveloped between 2015 and 2018 following announcement of the programme in 2014. After securing funding from Moreton Bay Regional Council and the Federal Government funding phase 1 of the redeveloped ground, Moreton Daily Stadium was opened. The second phase of work completed in February 2018. The third stage was completed in September 2020 with a new Northern Grandstand being built. On 7 December 2022, it was announced that Moreton Daily Stadium will now be known as Kayo Stadium. Broadcast standard light towers were installed in 2023 and were first used in an NRL game between the Dolphins and St George Illawarra on May 25, 2023 at a cost of $3 million.

== Sources ==
- McLennan, Don, From Shellgrit to Dolphins: A History of the Redcliffe District Rugby League Football Club, 1995, Peninsula Printers.
