= Goodwood Baseball Club =

Information
- League: South Australian Baseball League

Goodwood is a Baseball club playing in the South Australian Baseball League. Known as the Indians, their home ground is Mortlock Park in Colonel Light Gardens. The Goodwood Baseball Club was founded in 1889 and is the oldest baseball club in existence in South Australia and the oldest continuous baseball club in Australia.

== See also ==
- South Australian Baseball League 2005–2006
- Neil Page
