= Surfers Paradise Baseball Club =

Surfers Paradise
- Logo

Information
- League: Greater Brisbane League (Southside)
- Location: Benowa, Queensland
- Ballpark: Sir Bruce Small Park "BenowaDome"
- Founded: 1987; 39 years ago
- Nickname: Bluewave
- League championships: 1987, 2004, 2006, 2007, 2009, 2012, 2018, 2024
- Colors: Blue and white
- President: Tony McPhail

Current uniforms
Current	Alternative

The Surfers Paradise Baseball Club is one of Australia’s leading baseball clubs, based on the Gold Coast in Queensland, Australia. Established in 1987, the club competes across the Greater Brisbane League, Gold Coast Baseball Association, and Far North Coast competitions, providing pathways for players from grassroots participation through to elite representative baseball.

Known for its strong community culture and commitment to player development, the Surfers Paradise Baseball Club has built a reputation as a premier destination for baseball in Queensland. The club operates from the Sir Bruce Small Park sporting precinct and regularly hosts regional, national, and international tournaments.

The club has been a host venue for the Pan Pacific Masters Games and continues to play a significant role in the growth of baseball across South East Queensland. Surfers Paradise Baseball Club is recognised for its investment in junior development, women’s baseball, facility improvements, live streaming initiatives, and partnerships that support the long-term growth of the sport.

== History ==
John Carpenter, Mitch Wikum and Steve Meeham founded Surfers Paradise Baseball Club in 1987. That year the club entered three teams in the Brisbane metropolitan competition, and in their first season won the A-Grade title. This was achieved through the assistance of ex-Claxton Shield players from other states including: Larry Montgomery (NSW), Gary Coward (SA), Lance Wegner (VIC), as well as other quality players from around the Gold Coast and Brisbane region.

The idea for a junior competition on the Gold Coast, or at least Surfers Paradise, was initiated by Steve Meeham who advertised in the local paper for junior players. With mixed responses from players of all age groups, the competition attracted 60 kids between the ages of 10 and 14 years plus one father - Gary Edwards. With Gary's help, Steve split up the children into 5 equal sides, and rolled out a competition on Saturday mornings.

The five junior sides - Giants, Dodgers, Dragons, Reds and Sharks – attracted great success in the '88 to '89 season, and by the '89 to '90 season the number of kids playing baseball at Surfers Paradise had doubled. By the start of the '90 to '91 season, there was an abundance of young players with not enough coaches to manage them so the competition was forced to expand and teams were created in the areas where the kids lived such as Runaway Bay, Nerang and Palm Beach.

The first junior representative players to come from Surfers Paradise were Brandon Pollard, Trent Durrington, Shane Edwards and Adam Wardrop. All four boys were selected in the QLD U/16's squad in 1990 with each of them progressing to more senior representative teams over the years including National and Junior selection, as well as Australian Senior team selection for Trent and Brandon. Trent now runs a Training With the Pro's program out of the club every year in December.

On 21 December 2008 the team played in the Commissioners Cup at the Beenleigh Hawks baseball club and lost to the shield's incumbent, the Redcliffe Padres 4–3.

Throughout the 2000s and 2010s, Surfers Paradise became one of the most successful clubs in the Greater Brisbane League (GBL), winning premierships in 2004, 2006, 2007, 2009, 2012, 2018 and 2024. The club has also produced several players who progressed to professional and international baseball, including Trent Durrington, Max Durrington, Wayne Ough, Andrew Utting and Matthew Gahan.

== Notable players ==
- Max Durrington (Oakland A's)
- Trent Durrington (California Angels)
- Wayne Ough (New York Mets)
- Andrew Utting (Baltimore Orioles)
- Matthew Gahan (New York Mets)

== Managers ==
- Kevin Fenn (2019–present)
- Matt Corbitt (2017–2019)
- Jake McMaster (2016-2017)
- Jon Deeble (2015-2016)
- Peter Yates (2010-2015)
- Adam Wardrop (2002-2010)

== Presidents ==
- Tony McPhail (2020–present)
- Justine White (2019–2020)
- Tony McPhail (1996-2019)
- TBC (1987-1999)

== Life Members ==
- John Carpenter
- Judy Carpenter
- Ken Hussey
- Cherie Bombell
- Ron Bombell
- Frits Weber*
- Garry Edwards
- Gordon Wallace
- Tony McPhail
- Leigh McPhail
- Col Carruthers*
- Lindsay "Butch" Graham
- Bette Holland
- Adam Wardrop
- David Counter
- Mikael Weber
- Connie Stoyakovich
- Matt Studeman
- Kevin Fenn
- Stephen Horrigan
