= Talobilla Park =

Sporting facility in Kippa-Ring, Queensland

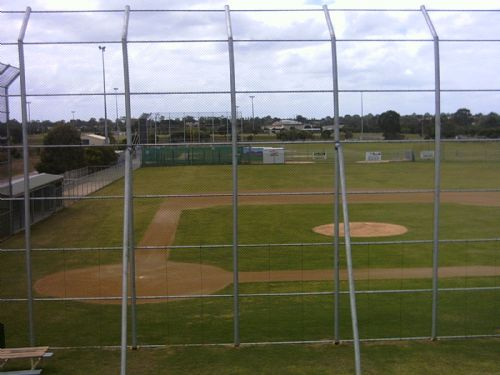
- Interactive map of Talobilla Park
- Location: Kligner Road, Redcliffe, Queensland
- Coordinates: 27°13′6″S 153°5′28″E
- Owner: Queensland Government
- Capacity: 100
- Surface: Grass
- Field size: Left field – 300 feet (91 m); Left-Center Field – 330 feet (101 m); Center field – 375 feet (114 m); Right-Center Field – 330 feet (101 m); Right field – 305 feet (93 m)

Construction
- Opened: 2004

Tenant
- Redcliffe Padres

Talobilla Park is a sporting facility located in the suburb of Kippa-Ring, Queensland in Australia. Sports include baseball, canoeing, dragon boating, Association football, rugby league and softball. Talobilla Park also contains an Automated Weather Observing System for the Australian Bureau of Meteorology. It is built on an old landfill reserve.

== Baseball ==
Talobilla has two regulation-size baseball diamonds built in 2004 including one regulation Little League field. The main diamond is a fully fenced and regulation-sized baseball field with field-level dugouts, two bullpens, two battery cages, a scorers box, canteen, bar and shaded seating for approx 100. Major A standard floodlighting and a second amenities block with an umpires change room and showers has also been proposed by the Moreton Bay Regional Council and will be completed before the 2010 season.

Diamond two is also a regulation-sized baseball diamond with training standard floodlighting. It is home to the Redcliffe Padres, the largest baseball club in Queensland and second largest in Australia. It has hosted a variety of events including Queensland schoolboys and club junior state titles.

== Ground Rules ==
- A baseball hit onto the left field batting cages that rolls or bounces back off into play, shall be ruled a home run.
