= Ipswich Musketeers =

Information
- League: Greater Brisbane League (Westside)
- Location: Tivoli, Queensland
- Ballpark: Church Street
- Founded: 1954
- League championships: 1967, 1985, 1986, 1987
- Colors: Red, White & Blue

Current uniforms
Current	Junior

The Ipswich Musketeers Baseball Club is a baseball club located in Tivoli, Queensland, that participates in the Greater Brisbane League competition and the Brisbane West competition. It is one of the oldest clubs in Queensland and the only club existing from the old Ipswich Baseball Association.

== History ==
Ipswich Musketeers was formed in 1954 originally to play in the Brisbane fixtures, but as the game developed in Ipswich, there were sufficient teams to run a local association. A sporting ground in Ipswich to be located at Church Street became available with Spring and Newtown streets, East Ipswich and Musketeers being successful tenderer from a large group of applicants.

After time the association waned and now Musketeers are the only team representing Ipswich in the Brisbane competition. Over years however, Ipswich has won the premiership in every grade, including club championship. A-Grade premierships include 1967, 1985, 1986, 1987, 1988, 1989, 2001.

The first Queensland representatives were Ken Hogan and Bill Castley and first Australian representative Max Cummins.

== Current season ==
In 2015, Ipswich finished Minor Premiers in Major A Grade but were beaten in the Championship series by Windsor Royals.
