= Greater Brisbane League =

Baseball league in Queensland, Australia

- Current season, competition or edition: Greater Brisbane League 2020–21
- Sport: Baseball
- Founded: 1946; 80 years ago
- Founder: Baseball Queensland
- No. of teams: 20 (9 Div 1&2 teams)
- Country: Australia
- Most recent champion: Windsor Royals
- Related competitions: Claxton Shield
- Website: http://www.qld.baseball.com.au

The Greater Brisbane League or formerly the Greater Brisbane Baseball Board league (GB3) is the largest baseball league in the Australian state of Queensland and covers all teams from Brisbane North, South, West, Metro as well as three Gold Coast teams. These are from age groups Little League (U12) through to seniors. It is run by the governing body of Baseball Queensland.

To participate in the Greater Brisbane Major League, clubs must meet certain criteria set by Baseball Queensland. Generally the hardest criteria for clubs to meet is to field a team in the junior age levels U14's, U16's and U20's. When this criterion is not met, senior teams may only compete in the South Queensland Baseball League or Pacific League competition.

The GBL consists of six senior division teams from Major/Pacific League A and B through to South Queensland League A-C and a separate Masters competition. Juniors consist of an U20 competition, division one and two U16 and a division one and two U14 competitions. U8, U10 and U12 competitions are run by their respective regions and are non-divisional.

== History ==
The Greater Brisbane League was originally known as the Queensland Baseball Association fixtures, which began in 1946 when six teams entered the competition playing primarily at New Farm Park, Kalinga Park, Langlands Park, Perry Park and the Brisbane Exhibition Ground. Uniforms were made out of surplus army uniforms and teams made up of many American ex-pat soldiers from World War II and A-Grade cricketers to keep game fit during the off-season.

== Format ==
The current format of the league consists of six divisions as well as a concurrently run 'masters' division for players aged over 35 and women's competition. The competition is scheduled to last 16–20 rounds played on Fridays and Sundays between the first week of October with the playoffs finishing prior to Easter.

Rounds played in Division 1 see teams match up twice in the round, usually on a Friday followed by Sunday. Rainouts are made up mid-week if possible. Division 2 is fixtured essentially as a reserve team for Division 1, playing the same club match ups prior to the Sunday game.

Clubs who do not field a Division 1 team may field individual teams in Division 3–6.

Playoffs are a top four McIntyre system, with Division 1 playing a best of three series to determine winners.

== Teams ==
Clubs currently in the Greater Brisbane League are:

Division	Team	Based	Field	
Gold Coast	Coomera Cubs Baseball Club	Coomera	Gambamora Park	
Gold Coast	Mudgeeraba Redsox	Mudgeeraba	Firth Park	
Gold Coast	Surfers Paradise	Benowa	Sir Bruce Small Park	
Brisbane South	Mt Gravatt Eagles	Mackenzie	Weedon Street	
Brisbane South	Beenleigh Hawks	Beenleigh	T E Costigan Field	
Brisbane South	Indians Baseball Club	Runcorn	Dew Street	
Brisbane South	Redlands Baseball Club	Sheldon	John Murray Field	
Brisbane West	Ipswich Musketeers	Tivoli	Church Street	
Brisbane West	Western Districts Bulldogs	Darra	Atthows Park	
Brisbane West	Toowoomba Rangers	Toowoomba	Commonwealth Oval	
Brisbane West	Southern Stars	Browns Plains	Regency Park	
Sunshine Coast	Sunshine Coast^{*}	Mudjimba	Mudjimba Multisports Complex	
Sunshine Coast	The Mackerels Baseball Club**	Maroochydore	Elizabeth Daniels Fields, Maroochydore Cricket club	
Brisbane North	Narangba Demons	Narangba	Narangba Sport & Recreation Complex	
Brisbane North	Redcliffe Padres	Redcliffe	Talobilla Park	
Brisbane North	Pine Rivers Rapids	Bray Park	Les Hughes Sporting Complex	-
Brisbane Metro	All Stars	Hendra	Bannister Park	
Brisbane Metro	Carina Redsox	Carina	Foley Field	
Brisbane Metro	Pine Hills Lightning	Bunya	James Drysdale Reserve	
Brisbane Metro	Windsor Royals	Newmarket	Holloway Field	

*Sunshine Coast only field junior (non GBL competitors) and women's teams (GBL competitors)

**The Mackerels Baseball Club currently fields players 11 years to 17 years of age in association with Narangba Demons as the club was established in July 2020 with support from Baseball Qld.

Below is a map indicating the locations of all eighteen teams competing in the Greater Brisbane League competition. The Brisbane CBD is represented by the black square. Also note Toowoomba is located off the map to the west:

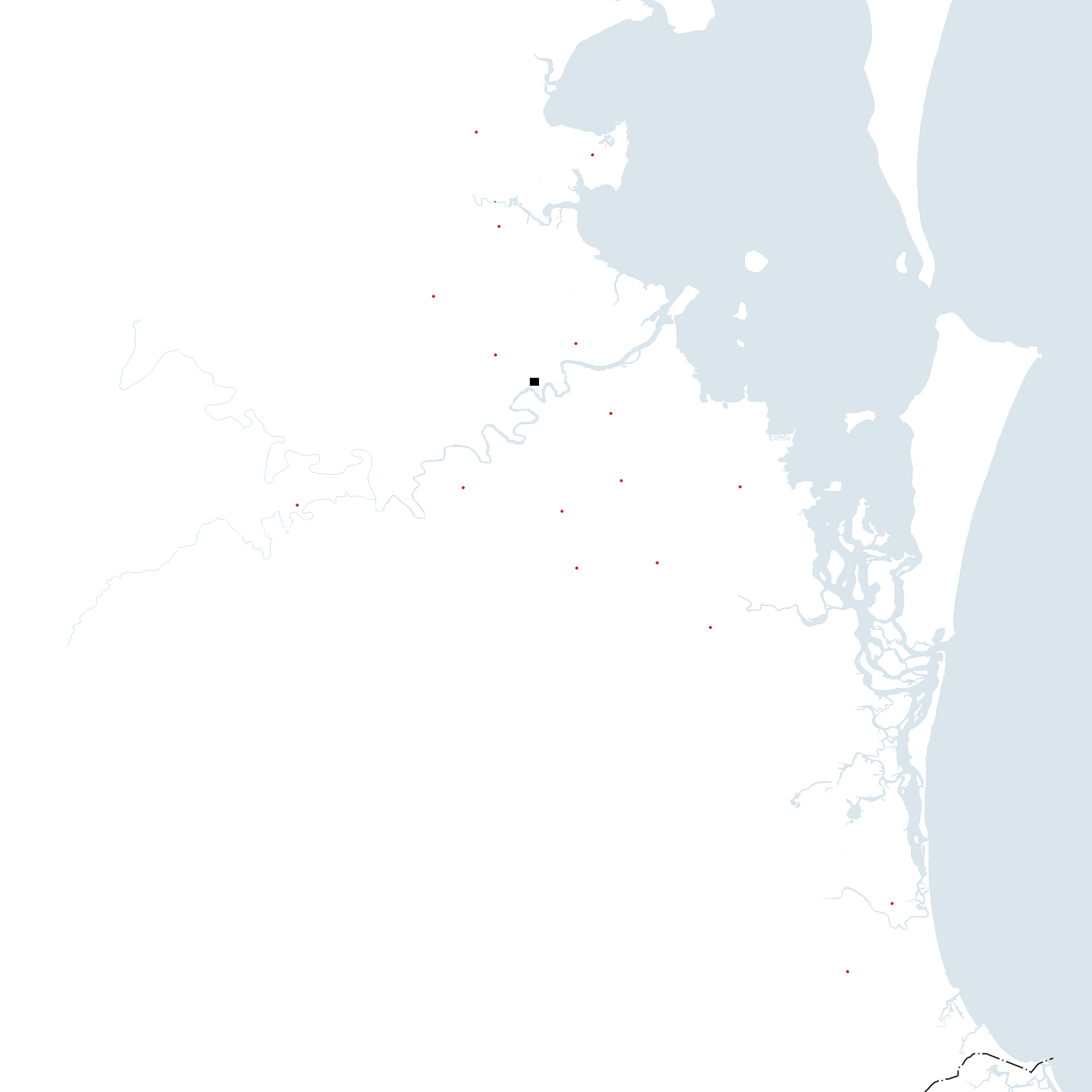

== Commissioners Cup ==
The Commissioners Cup or Commissioners Shield is an annual, end of year event that usually coincides with the Christmas break of the season. It is a one off game in Major A, B and C grades between the current Greater Brisbane League leaders of the Northside and the Southside.

Major A standings are on win percentage, whereas Major B and C-Grade standings are on points.

== Major League Criteria ==
The basics to qualifying for Major League criteria, clubs must have a minimum of:

- 27 senior registered players excluding U18's, in at least the Major A, B and C grades
- 60 junior registered players
- One team in each of the Baseball Queensland U14, U16 and U20 competitions; together with a minimum of one team in each of Little League, U8 and U10
- One level 1 accredited coach to each team: LL, U14, U16, U20 and all senior teams
- One accredited scorer and umpire for all junior and senior games

== Champions ==
See: List of Greater Brisbane League seasons#Greater Brisbane League

== Media coverage ==
The Greater Brisbane League is covered across many media sources from Quest Community Newspapers including the Redcliffe and Bayside Herald, Caboolture Shire Herald, Albert and Logan News, Pine Rivers Press, Northern Times, and the Logan West Leader, as well as many other regional newspapers such as the Hinterland Grapevine, The Sunshine Coast Daily, Gold Coast Bulletin, Benowa Garden News, and the Mudgee Guardian.

Major League results are also covered by the television network 7 and more in depth results are covered by The Sunday Mail and The Courier Mail.

== See also ==
- Baseball awards § Australia
