= Adelaide Baseball Club =

South Australian baseball club

Adelaide Angels Baseball Club
- Logo

Information
- League: South Australian Baseball League (Divisions 1, 2, 3, 4, 5, 6, 7 & 8)
- Location: Plympton, South Australia
- Ballpark: Weigall Oval
- Founded: 1908
- League championships: 1914, 1960, 2001/02
- Former name: Adelaide Baseball Club
- Former ballpark(s): Adelaide South Parklands, West Beach Reserve
- Colors: Yellow, White & Navy Blue

Current uniforms
Current	Alternate

Adelaide Angels Baseball Club is a Baseball Club in Adelaide, South Australia, The club plays in the South Australian Baseball League. The club is based at Weigall Oval in Plympton a suburb of Adelaide.
