= Baseball Queensland =

Australian baseball governing body

- Sport: Baseball
- Jurisdiction: Queensland
- Abbreviation: BQ
- Headquarters: Milton, Queensland
- (Queensland)

Baseball Queensland is the governing body of baseball within Queensland. Baseball Queensland is governed by the Australian Baseball Federation. It is located in Milton, Queensland and run by chief executive officer Col Dick.

It is also the governing bodies that picks the Queensland Rams team that competes in the Claxton Shield. It also picks U14, U16 and U18 state teams and Greater Brisbane League All-Star teams, the largest competition in Queensland. It runs all regional bodies in Queensland and the far north coast of New South Wales and also controls the Queensland Umpires, Scorers and Coaches associations.

== Controversy ==
In November 2008, the Pine Rivers Rapids announced their interest in a breakaway league from the Greater Brisbane League that Baseball Queensland runs. The controversy arose before the start of the 2008–2009 season when Pine Rivers amongst other high-profile clubs, were warned that they are in danger of not meeting GBL Major League criteria which enables them to have a team in the top three divisions of Queensland baseball. The 'mutiny' is led by club committee members, Derek Harvey and Peter Dutton, father of Australian baseballer Brad Dutton.

The push for a breakaway league as of December 2008 seems to have died off with all big Greater Brisbane League clubs declaring their support for Baseball Queensland including Redcliffe Padres, Narangba Demons, Redlands Baseball Club and Pine Hills Lightning. On 31 November 2008, Rapids forfeited their 3rd Major B game of the season which according to GBL breach of forfeit rules:

- 1st breach - notified more than 48 hours $50.00
- 1st breach - not notified $100.00
- 2nd breach $200.00
- 3rd breach Removed from competition

And without a team in Major A, B and C, a club cannot qualify for Major League criteria (see GBL Major League Criteria). This left Baseball Queensland in a compromising position whether to kick Major A leaders, Pine Rivers Rapids out of Major League or continue to be criticised by other clubs for not following through with GBL By-Laws.

== Regions ==
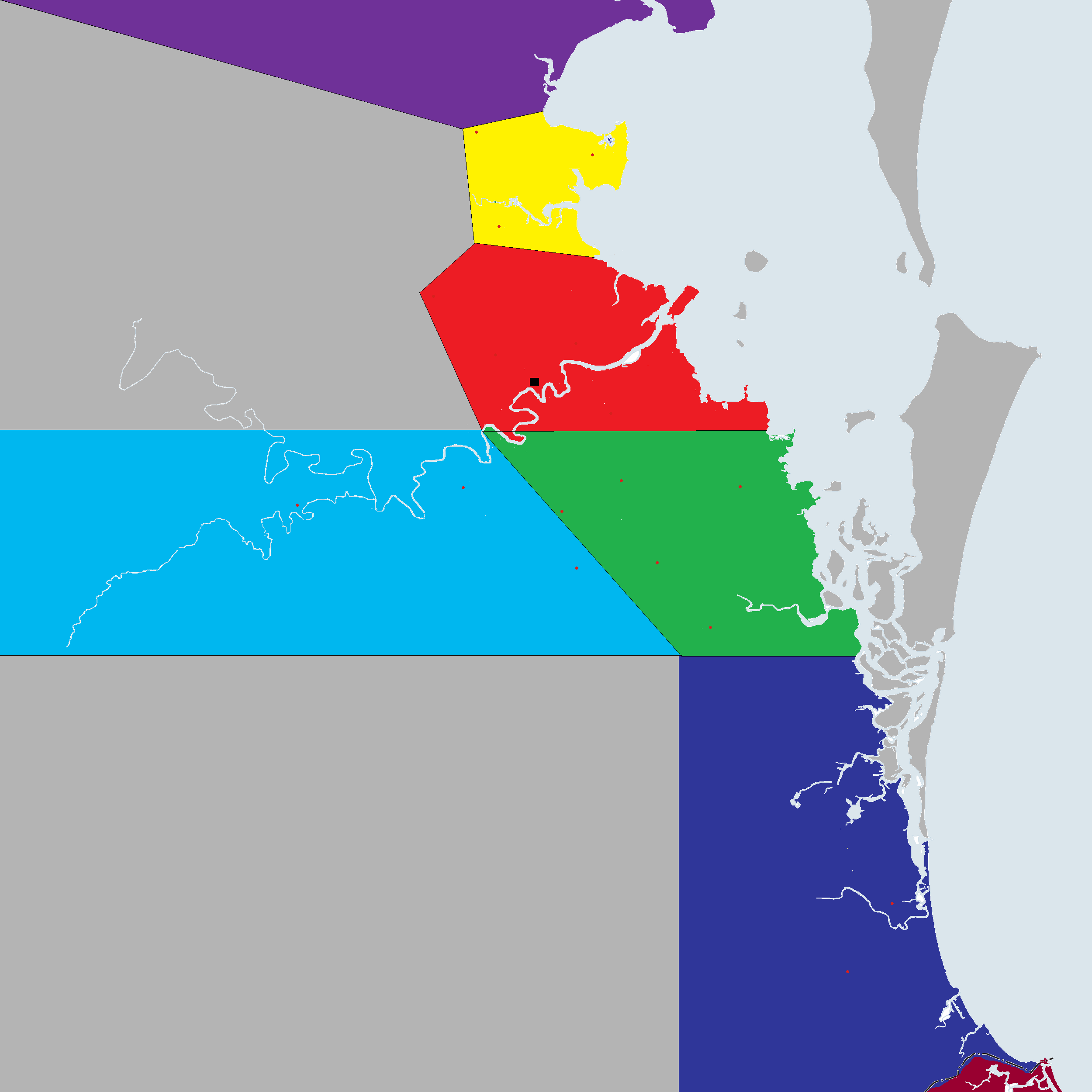
The regions in south-east Queensland

Baseball Queensland is split into eight regions, seven of which are active as April 2009. These regions are listed below:

- North Queensland
- Sunshine Coast
- Brisbane North
- Brisbane Metro
- Brisbane West
- Brisbane South
- Gold Coast

== Awards ==
On 9 December 2008, the Australian Baseball Federation announced the 2009 Baseball Australia Diamond Awards with Baseball Queensland picking up:

- Club of the Year: Redcliffe Padres
- Official of the Year: Mal MacKay - Umpire
- Volunteer of the Year: Louise Paewai - Pine Hills Lightning
- Player of the Year (Youth): James Linger - Windsor Royals

Awards will be presented 21 February 2009 in Melbourne, Victoria.
