= Pine Hills Lightning =

Information
- League: Greater Brisbane League (Northside)
- Location: Bunya, Queensland
- Ballpark: Jinker Track
- Founded: 1990
- League championships: 2011, 2020
- Former name: Mitchelton Unicorns, All Stars Lightning
- Former ballpark: Mitchelton, Queensland
- Colors: Black, yellow and white

Current uniforms
Current	Old

The Pine Hills Lightning Baseball Club is a baseball club that participates in the Greater Brisbane League competition and Brisbane Metropolitan Region competition. It is the 4th largest baseball club in Australia and second largest after the Redcliffe Padres in Queensland.

== History ==
In 1984 the club was formed, originally known as the Mitchelton Unicorns. The club shared playing fields at Mitchelton, Queensland with Wests Mitchelton Rugby League Club for a handful of Tee-ball teams. Whilst the fields were only ever used in the rugby league offseason, relations were often uneasy between the two parties. This coupled with a vision of baseball participation expanding rapidly started the search for bigger fields. The club moved and commenced using the new Bunya fields in 1990. Renamed the Pine Hills Unicorns, a division of the Pine Hills Sports Club, playing numbers continued to grow.

In their tenth year a name change to Pine Hills Lightning was passed. Over the years several dedicated families have worked hard to establish and further develop the club. Over time, player numbers grew to the point where teams could be added in more junior grades of the Brisbane competition, however the club was resigned to losing its best players as the club had no teams in Brisbane's elite Majors competition, and players would leave to play Majors elsewhere.

In 2004 a decision was made to merge with the All Stars Baseball Club, allowing Pine Hills juniors the chance to play Majors without leaving the club. All Stars at the time had the reverse issue, with strong senior numbers but flagging junior numbers making the merger mutually beneficial. This merger became known as the All Stars Lightning Baseball Club and fielded its first team at the start of the 2004/05 season. The merger was short-lived due to uneasy relations between the two parties and logistical difficulties of playing out of two centres; and was split after only two seasons.

Pine Hills decided they were in a position to field their own teams as of the 2006/07 season and chose to become a standalone club; as did All Stars who resumed their old branding. The first Pine Hills Major A team took the field in September 2006. That same month the Aspley Leagues Club opened a new entertainment complex at the Bunya reserve.

The standalone club's Major A side made its first finals series in 2007/08, in just its second year of existence. Since becoming a Major A club it has made the finals 5 times (2007/08, 2008/09, 2010/11, 2011/12 and 2012/13) and missed out on 3 occasions (2006/07, 2009/10 and 2013/14). It won its first Major A premiership in 2010/11, with a grand final clean sweep over Windsor.

Each year the club plays against Windsor Royals during a designated regular season game for the Paul Mutch Cup. Paul had played juniors at Pine Hills and seniors at Windsor and was a dedicated player for both clubs. Each year the contest in his memory is passionate; and as of Pine Hills' victory in the 2013/14 season the tally stands at 5-5. The game's MVP is awarded the John Macan Medal; the late John being former president of Windsor Royals and a greatly respected figure among both clubs. A significant number of players have played for both clubs and a rivalry has always existed between the two. In recent years however this has taken on renewed vigour, with the clubs meeting in each of the last 3 finals series.

== Facilities ==
The club has 4 playing fields with all dugouts and scorers huts have shade. Diamonds 1 and 2 have lights suitable for training. Diamond one has recently been upgraded with a top quality surface and AAA floodlighting. The club also utilises a fully automated Iron Mike pitching machine as well as an electronic scoreboard.

== Notable players ==
- Joel Naughton - Philadelphia Phillies

== See also ==
- Greater Brisbane League
- Baseball Queensland
