= Windsor Royals =

Windsor Royals Baseball Club

Information
- League: Greater Brisbane League
- Location: Newmarket, Queensland
- Ballpark: Holloway Field 1955
- Founded: 1948; 77 years ago
- League championships: 1949, 1951, 1952, 1953, 1976, 1978, 1979, 1980, 1981, 2000, 2013, 2014, 2015, 2016, 2017, 2019, 2021, 2023, 2025
- Former name: Windsor Engineers

Current uniforms
Home	Away

The Windsor Royals, originally known simply as Windsor baseball club and formerly the Windsor Engineers is a baseball club that participates in the Greater Brisbane League competition and Brisbane Metro Baseball competition.

== History ==
The 1948-1954 Windsor Engineers was the foundation of the Royals club, instituted by local Member of Parliament Bob Windsor. The club held its first official meeting on 5 May 1955 and first match two days later at Spencer Park. By 1958 the club had its first junior team and foundation members Stan Holloway and Eddie Tyler were made life members. In 1962 the club was renamed the Windsor Pepsi Pirates and it leased part of Spencer Park and named it Holloway Field, the ground was officially opened on 10 May 1964. It was also the first field to sell advertising space on its home run fence and brick dugouts The club was renamed the Windsor Royals in 1991.

The club had the honour in 1968 to host the second Claxton Shield year for Queensland, the first time a club side has hosted such team on their home ground. Holloway Field has been the venue for many more state games since.

The club's history has included the most Major League Championships in Queensland baseball which now stands at 19, winning in the following years: 1949, 1951, 1952, 1953, 1976, 1978, 1979, 1980, 1981, 2000, 2013, 2014, 2015, 2016, 2017, 2019, 2021, 2023 & 2025

Windsor has also been Runner-up another 16 times in Major League Grand Finals and has made the post season 49 times.

The club has in recent years endured frustration in its quest to win a Major A championship, losing grand finals in 2004, 2010, 2011 and 2012. This broke in 2013 when the Major A team took home the championship with a two-game sweep of Redlands Rays. The team were minor premiers and won a record 21 straight games to take out the championship on 24 March 2013.

The club has also won the Greater Brisbane Baseball Club Champions award 20 times.
