= John Banfill =

American politician

- Banfill c. 1858

Member of the Minnesota Senate from the 24th District
- In office December 2, 1857 – December 6, 1859

Bayfield County Probate Judge
- In office 1870–1878

Personal details
- Born: February 12, 1811 Topsham, Vermont, U.S.
- Died: May 13, 1887 (aged 76) Bayfield, Wisconsin, U.S.

Military service
- Allegiance: United States of America
- Battles/wars: Seminole Wars

John Banfill (February 12, 1811 – May 13, 1887), also spelled John Banfil, was an American businessman, politician, and judge who founded the city of Fridley, Minnesota. Banfill's Fridley residence, the Banfill Tavern, is listed on the National Register of Historic Places.

== Early life and career ==
Banfill was born on February 12, 1811 in Topsham, Vermont. Banfill worked as a mason in New Orleans, Louisiana, Albany, New York, and Lancaster, Wisconsin, where he assisted in the construction of various buildings. During the Seminole Wars Banfill served as a volunteer and was involved in the recovery of the bodies of members of Francis L. Dade's expedition who were killed in the Dade battle. Banfill later worked in Prairie du Chien, Wisconsin, as the proprietor of the Grant House.

By 1844 Banfill owned a hotel in Garnavillo, Iowa, called the "Banfill Hotel". He later assisted in the construction of the first Clayton County Courthouse in Clayton County, Iowa, where he was contracted for lathing and plaster work.^{50,69} In 1847, Banfill moved to Minnesota Territory and constructed the home of Henry M. Rice.

Banfill was the founder and first permanent citizen of Manomin, Minnesota, where he built a sawmill and a general store. Manomin was later renamed Fridley, after Abram M. Fridley. While in Manomin, Banfill constructed the Banfill Tavern, an inn and tavern for travelers and merchants along Minnesota's first territorial road and later the Red River Trails.

== Politics ==
Banfill was elected to the Minnesota Senate on October 13, 1857, to represent Minnesota's 24th Senate district. He served during the 1st Minnesota Legislature from December 2, 1857 to December 6, 1859, as a member of the Roads and Bridges Committee and the Federal Relations Committee.

== Later life ==
In 1861, Banfill moved to Bayfield County, Wisconsin, and served as the county's probate court judge. He also served as the treasurer of Bayfield schools and chairman of the county commission.

== Personal life and death ==
Banfill married Nancy Foster of New York City in 1838. He died on May 13, 1887, in Bayfield, Wisconsin.
