= Savelkoul =

Savelkoul is a surname. Notable people with the surname include:

- Donald Savelkoul (1917–2004), American lawyer, politician, and businessman
- Henry J. Savelkoul (born 1940), American politician
