= Banfill Tavern =

Building in Fridley, Minnesota, United States

- U.S. National Register of Historic Places
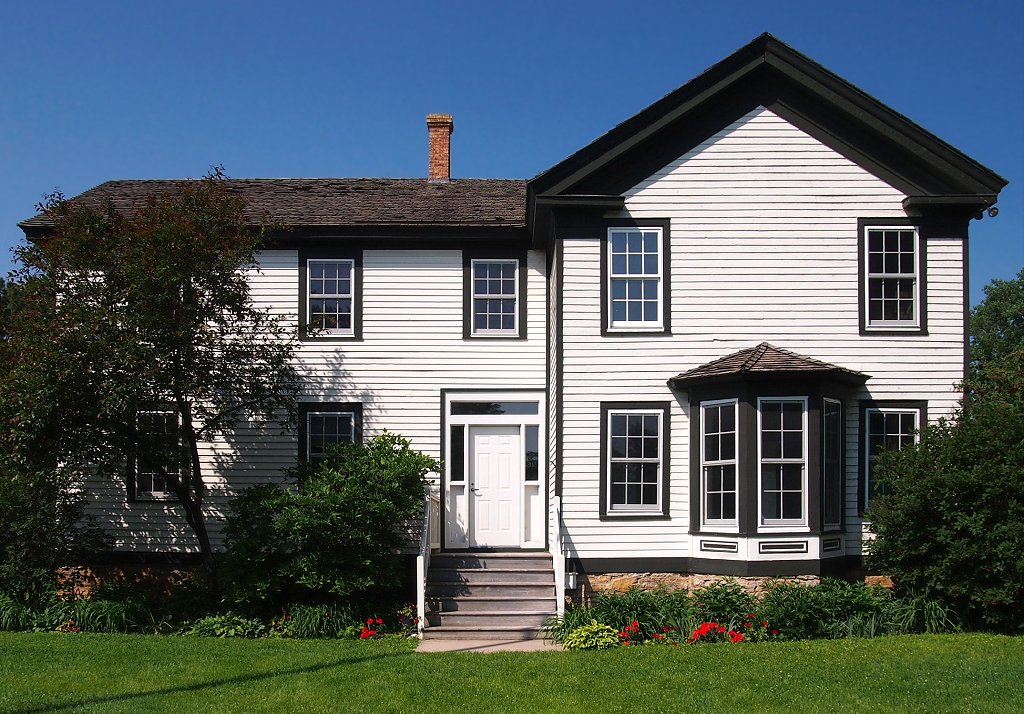
- Banfill Tavern viewed from the northeast

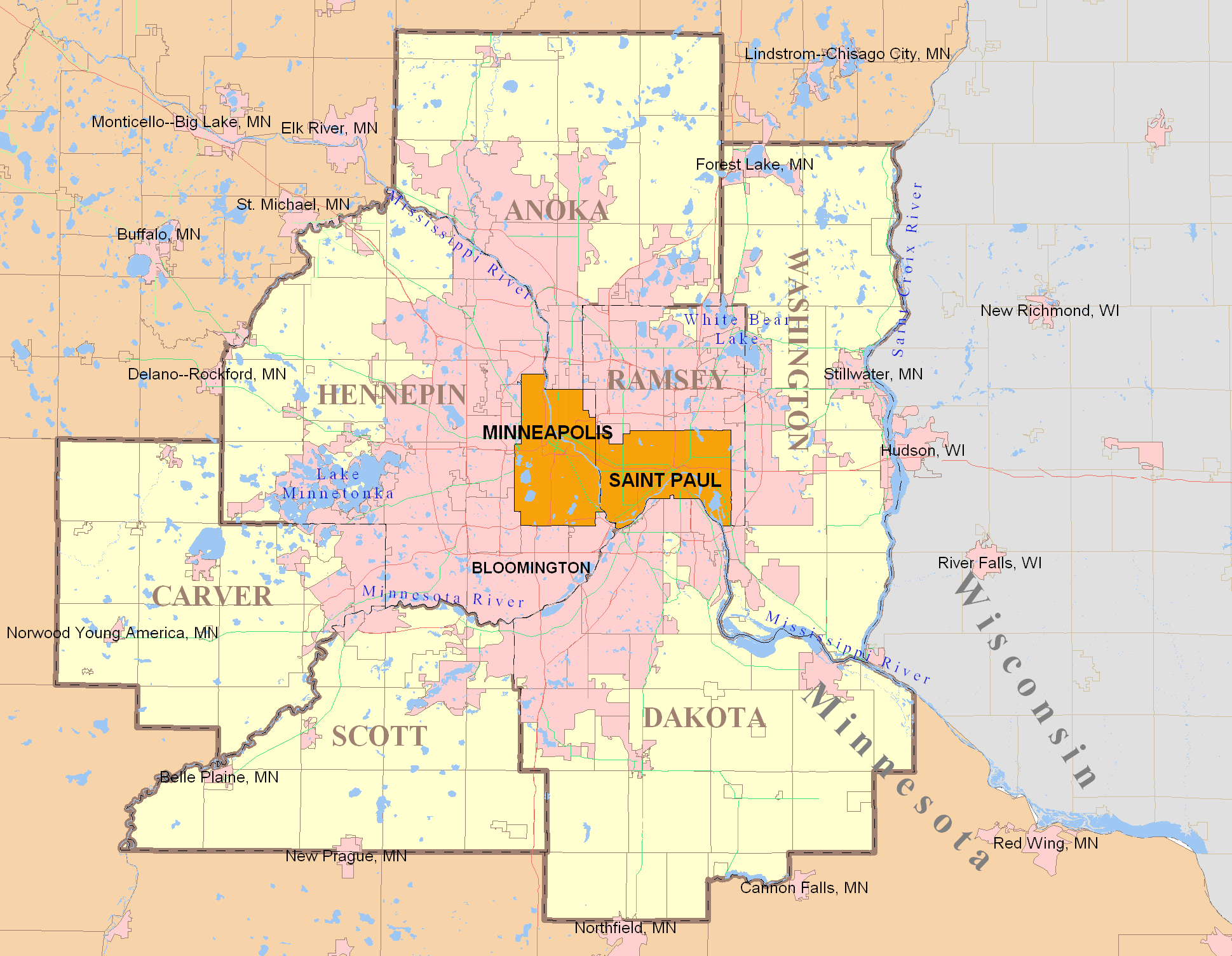
- Location within Minneapolis–Saint Paul Location within Minnesota Location within the United States
- Location: 6666 East River Road, Fridley, Minnesota
- Coordinates: 45°5′20.5″N 93°16′36.5″W
- Area: 1 acre (0.40 ha)
- Built: 1847
- Built by: Unknown
- Architectural style: Greek Revival
- NRHP reference No.: 76001044
- Added to NRHP: December 12, 1976

The Banfill Tavern, also known as the Locke House, is a historic building in Fridley, Minnesota, United States. It was built in 1847 on the east bank of the Mississippi River and has served variously as an inn, a logging camp office, a private home, a dairy farm, a post office, and a summer home. It is now owned by Anoka County and, until April 2022, housed the non-profit Banfill-Locke Center for the Arts (now the North Suburban Center for the Arts). The building stands within Manomin County Park, and the art center is a partner site of the Mississippi National River and Recreation Area.

The Banfill Tavern was listed on the National Register of Historic Places in 1976 for its local significance in the theme of architecture. It was nominated for being one of the earliest and best preserved frame Greek Revival houses in Anoka County.

== Description ==
The Banfill Tavern is located on a wooded site near the mouth of Rice Creek. Its floor plan follows an "L" shape. It exhibits Greek Revival style through such architectural features as the six-over-six pane double-hung windows, a tripartite formal entry consisting of a central door with sidelights and a transom, broken-pedimented gables, corner pilasters, and slender brick chimneys.

As of 2017, both the interior and exterior of the home remain essentially unaltered. The interior consists of a large communal room on the first floor that contains an entryway, dining room, living room, kitchen, and service room. Seven interconnected rooms make up the second floor. The entire structure lacks any form of modern central heating. Instead stoves feeding into three chimneys provide warmth.

== History ==
Built in 1847 by John Banfill, the building initially served as an inn and a base for logging operations northwest of Saint Anthony Falls. Due to its proximity to Minnesota's first Territorial Road and the Red River Trails, the inn became a popular rest stop for travelers. John Banfill was elected to the Minnesota State Senate for the 1st Minnesota Legislature in 1848.

An account provided by E. S. Seymour, a visitor to the tavern in 1849, reveals that in its first years of operation the popular stop lacked adequate stable space. Consequently, many travelers' horses and mules remained in the open during the winter of 1848–1849. By the time of Seymour's visit, Banfill had expanded his stall space to accommodate forty horses and mules. Another visitor complimented Banfill on his "good old sparkling Madeira". Travelers filled the Banfill house every night on their way to destinations along the road, including Fort Gaines (renamed Fort Ripley in 1850), the Chippewa Agency, and trading posts, in addition to private homes.

Between 1857 and 1875 it is uncertain who owned the property. In 1876, however, William F. Brown married Laura M. Locke and purchased it. The couple maintained a dairy herd and lived in the house while Brown also worked as postmaster until his death in 1887. His wife and children lived in the house until 1912, when Laura sold it to her brother, Cassius M. Locke.

Locke and his wife Roberta Pratt Locke raised registered Jersey cattle on the farm and used it as a summer home. They made a few additions to the house, including front and rear porches, kitchen and bathroom electrical service, a pump, a water closet, and a sewage disposal system. Most of these improvements took place in the 1930s.

Cassius Locke died in 1947 and Roberta in 1959. The property remained unoccupied until 1967, when Anoka County purchased it. In 1988 an art center founded in 1979 forged a public–private partnership with the county to move into Banfill Tavern after outgrowing its original site. The Banfill-Locke Center for the Arts uses the facility in support of established and developing artists by hosting speakers, classes, and residents in addition to gallery space.

== See also ==
- National Register of Historic Places listings in Anoka County, Minnesota
