= Minco =

Minco may refer to:

- Minco, Oklahoma, a city in the United States
- Minco Products, an American electronics manufacturer
