= Manomin County, Minnesota =

Coordinates: 45°4′N 93°15′W

Manomin County
- Former U.S. county in Minnesota

- Founded: May 23, 1857
- Dissolved: November 2, 1869
- Seat: Manomin

Area
  - Total: 16 sq mi (41 km^{2})

Population
  - Estimate (1860): 136

Manomin County was a county in Minnesota that existed separately for 13 years from 1857 to 1869. The land was originally split off from Ramsey County. When it was formed, it was the smallest county in the United States at roughly 16 square miles. It comprised the Fridley Township, named for Minnesota legislator Abram M. Fridley. Abram Fridley was the chairman of the county commissioners during the lifetime of the county. The population in 1860 was 136. It was merged into Anoka County in 1869. This land area currently makes up the unusual southward extension of Anoka County between Hennepin and Ramsey counties. The former county seat of Manomin is now within the boundaries of the city of Fridley, Minnesota. The Manomin County Park in Fridley, at the confluence of Rice Creek and the Mississippi River remains near the former Manomin town site.

Manomin is a variant spelling of manoomin, the Ojibwe word for wild rice, a staple of their diet. A current Minnesota county, Mahnomen, created in 1906, is similarly named.

== History ==
Manomin county was created when the Fridley township sections were split from Ramsey County, on May 23, 1857. The county seat was Manomin (present-day Fridley). Another former county, Buchanan County, was created in Minnesota on the same day. Manomin County was disbanded in 1858 and administratively attached to St. Louis County, Minnesota. In 1860, it was attached to Anoka County. At the time, the area's population was 136. In 1863, it was attached to Hennepin County. An amendment to Article 11 of the state constitution, to bring Manomin County into Anoka county passed in the November 2, 1869, election with 88.9 percent support. Henry C. Fridley, son of territorial legislator Abram M. Fridley, would later describe the situation in a letter dated April 18, 1899.

- "...Of course, a county of so small an area and sparsely populated was unable to maintain an organization without embarrassment and liability of being subject to exorbitant taxation, should its political management fall into incompetent hands. It was 'an elephant on our hands,' difficult to get rid of, because of the constitutional provision against reducing counties below four hundred square miles, hence the constitutional amendment was submitted and adopted as the only way out of the dilemma."

== Geography ==
Within the boundaries of what was Manomin county are today the cities of Fridley, Columbia Heights, Hilltop, part of Spring Lake Park, and a small part of Coon Rapids. It was technically described,

- "The county of Manomin is established and bounded as Beginning in the middle of the channel of the Mississippi river at its with the line between townships twenty nine and thirty north of twenty four west from the fourth meridian thence east on said town line to the south east corner of town thirty of range twenty four thence on the east line of said town to the north east corner thereof thence on the north line of said town to the centre of the channel of the river thence down the middle of said channel to the place of beginning ."

The county consisted of 18 sections, of which six were bounded by the Mississippi river, and measured less than the 640 acres of a full section.
