= Rice Creek (Mississippi River tributary) =

River in Minnesota, United States of America

Coordinates: 45.0888°N 93.279°W

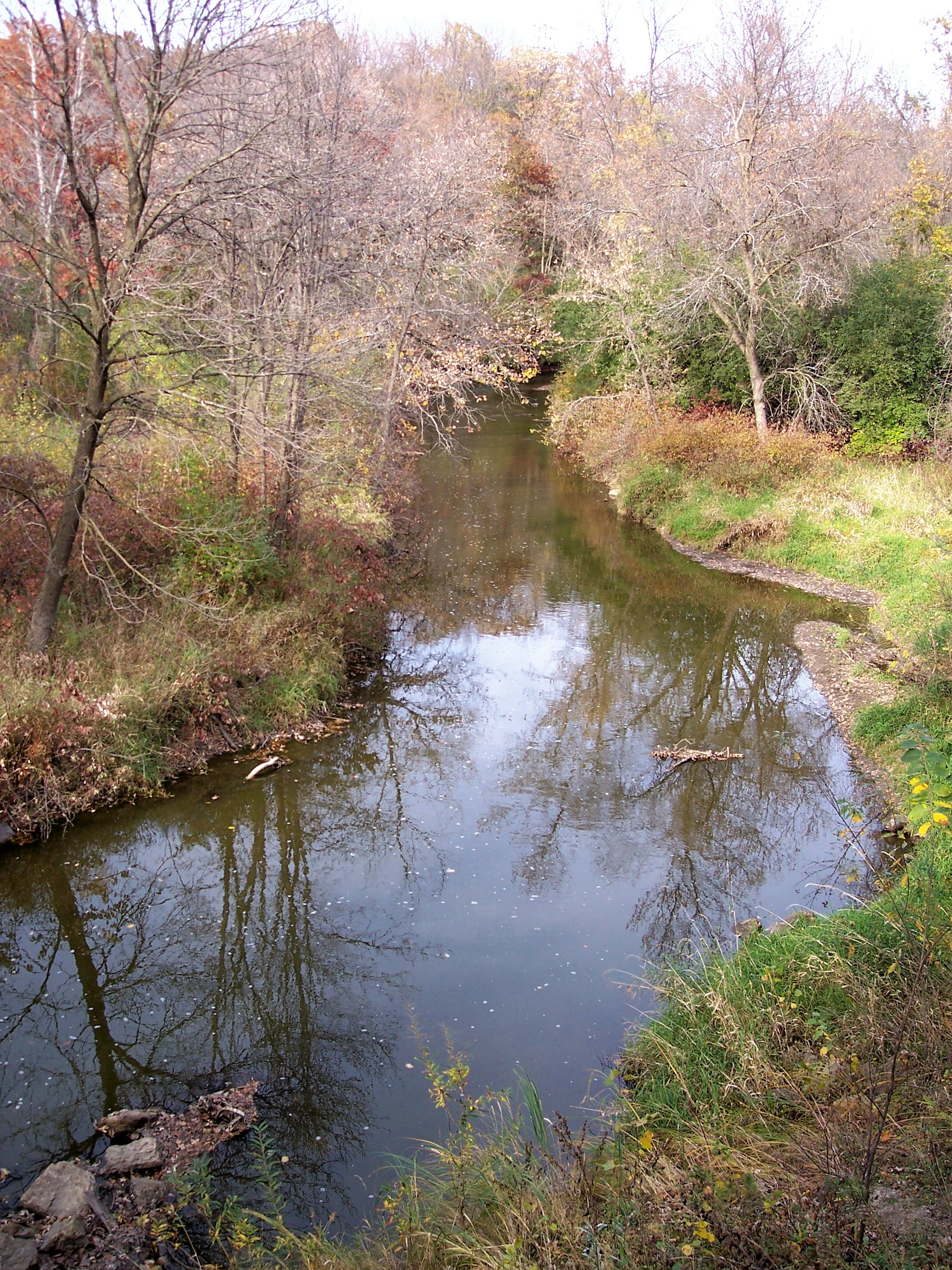
- Rice Creek in Fridley

- Location of mouth
- Native name: Oṭuƞwe Wakpadaƞ (Dakota); Manoominikan-ziibi (Ojibwe)

Location
- Country: United States

Physical characteristics
- Source
  - location: Clear Lake, Forest Lake, Minnesota
  - elevation: 890 ft (270 m)
- Mouth
  - location: Mississippi River, Fridley, Minnesota
  - elevation: 806 ft (246 m)
- Length: 28 mi (45 km)
- Basin size: 201 sq mi (520 km^{2})

Rice Creek, also known by the Dakota name Oṭuƞwe Wakpadaƞ and the Ojibwe Manoominikan-ziibi, is a tributary of the Mississippi River in the northern suburbs of the Minneapolis–St. Paul metropolitan area of Minnesota in the United States. It is approximately 28 miles (45 km) long and drains a watershed of 201 square miles (520 km^{2}).

== Course ==
Rice Creek has its source at Clear Lake in the city of Forest Lake in Washington County and flows generally southwestwardly through Anoka and Ramsey Counties, through the cities of Columbus, Lino Lakes, Circle Pines, Shoreview, Arden Hills, Mounds View, New Brighton and Fridley. It joins the Mississippi River at Manomin County Park in Fridley, about 1.5 miles (2.4 km) north of the I-694 Bridge. The creek drops about 84 feet (26 m) along its course, from its source elevation of 890 feet (270 m) to its mouth at 806 feet (246 m), with most of the drop (64 ft; 20 m) occurring in the 8 miles (13 km) upstream of its mouth; a lowland floodplain adjoins the stream in this reach.

In Anoka County, Rice Creek passes through an extensive network of lakes known as the Lino Lakes Chain of Lakes, a portion of which is preserved in the Rice Creek Chain of Lakes Regional Park Reserve, a regional park maintained by the government of Anoka County. In New Brighton, the creek passes through Long Lake, which is bordered by Long Lake Regional Park, maintained by Ramsey County. In Fridley, the lower course of creek is roughly paralleled by the Rice Creek West Regional Trail, a biking and hiking trail.

Rice Creek's principal tributaries are Hardwood Creek, which drains an area of 44 square miles (110 km^{2}) in the cities of Hugo, Forest Lake, and Lino Lakes; and Clearwater Creek, 8.33 miles (13.41 km) long, which drains an area of 62 square miles (160 km^{2}) in White Bear Lake, White Bear Township, Hugo, Lino Lakes, and Centerville. Both tributaries join Rice Creek in Anoka County as part of the chain of lakes.

== History ==
According to the Minnesota Historical Society, Rice Creek was named for Henry Mower Rice, one of the first pair of U.S. Senators sent to represent Minnesota upon its statehood, who acquired extensive lands near the lower course of the creek in 1849, though Edmund Rice describes Rice Brook in St. Paul as the "Rice Creek" named after his brother Henry Mower Rice.

Rice Creek was known in the Dakota language as Oṭuƞwe Wakpadaƞ which can be translated as "village on a small river"; its mouth was the site of a significant Bdewaḳaƞṭuƞwaƞ Dakota village for some time after the migration of the Mdewaḳaƞṭuƞwaƞ from Lake Mille Lacs around 1745 and the creek itself was a convenient route for Dakota trying to access the St. Croix River. At least one other account describes an alternate Dakota name Psiŋta Wakpadaŋ, which could be translated as "Creek Toward Wild Rice". Early surveys conducted by Joseph Nicollet record the name of Rice Creek as "Ottonwey River", likely a transcription of its Dakota name. Its Ojibwe language name has also been recorded as Manoominikan-ziibi, meaning "river full of wild rice".

Nicollet described the creek as: "At 2:45, as we left the islands behind, a rivulet about thirty feet wide entered the river from the left. Its shores are adorned with beautiful white lilies. Chagobay told me that it winds back to the vicinity of the Falls of the St. Croix River, being separated from the latter by only a short portage. Its course links several lakes, while irrigating a land abundant with wild rice where the Sioux gather their yearly provisions. The Sioux call it in their language Wild Rice River, and the Chippewa Manominikan Sibi, which means river where one reaps wild rice." which is known to have grown plentifully in the lakes of the watershed. "Manomin" (wild rice) was also the basis for the naming of the former Manomin County, which later was incorporated into Anoka County and ultimately became, in part, the city of Fridley, where the creek joins the Mississippi River.

Archaeological evidence exists that suggests ancestors of the Sioux hunted and fished in the vicinity of Bald Eagle Lake (approximately present-day White Bear Township) in the Rice Creek watershed, and had a summer village in the present-day city of Centerville as early as 2000 B.C.

A series of burial mounds (one linear and twelve conical) on the north side of Centerville Lake along the creek's course through Centerville are believed to have been built by people of the Mississippian culture who arrived in the area around the year 1400.

== Watershed ==
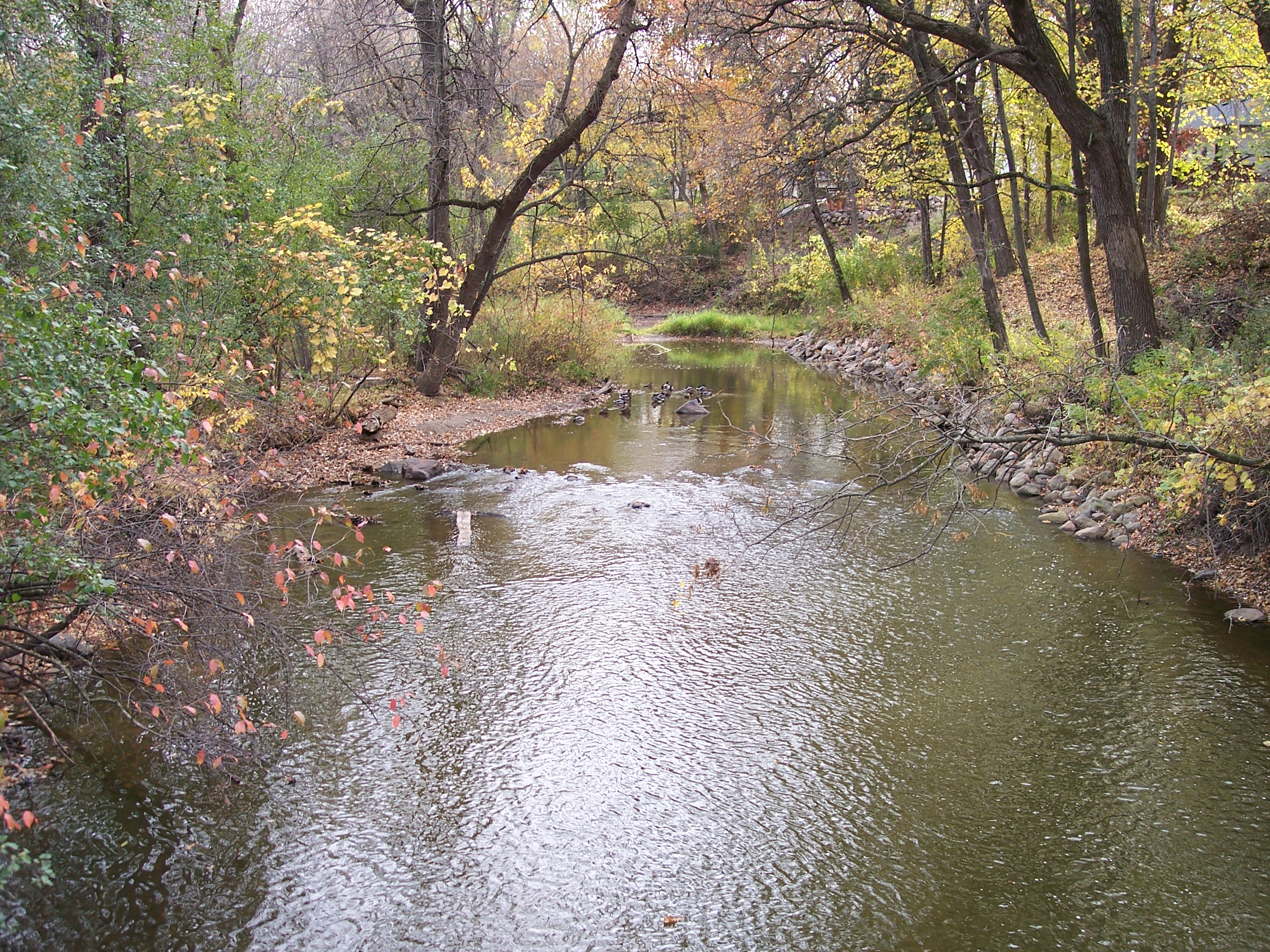
Rice Creek in Fridley

The Rice Creek watershed drains portions of Anoka, Hennepin, Ramsey, and Washington Counties:

- Anoka County - 76 mi^{2} (200 km^{2})
- Hennepin County - less than 0.1 mi^{2} (0.26 km^{2})
- Ramsey County - 48 mi^{2} (120 km^{2})
- Washington County - 77 mi^{2} (200 km^{2})

The watershed occupies portions of the following jurisdictions:

- Arden Hills
- Birchwood
- Blaine
- Centerville
- Circle Pines
- Columbia Heights
- Columbus
- Dellwood
- Falcon Heights
- Forest Lake
- Fridley
- Grant
- Hugo
- Lauderdale
- Lexington
- Lino Lakes
- Mahtomedi
- May Township
- Mounds View
- New Brighton
- Roseville
- St. Anthony
- Scandia
- Shoreview
- Spring Lake Park
- White Bear Lake
- White Bear Township
- Willernie

About 10 percent, or approximately 19 mi^{2} (49 km^{2}), of the watershed's surface area is occupied by lakes, the largest of which are White Bear Lake at 2,140 acres (8.7 km^{2}); and Bald Eagle Lake at 1,046 acres (4.23 km^{2}). Twenty-eight lakes in the watershed exceed 100 acres (0.40 km^{2}) in size. About 13 percent, or approximately 26 mi^{2} (67 km^{2}), of the watershed consists of wetlands.

The Rice Creek Watershed District was established in 1972 to "conserve and restore the water resources of the District for the beneficial use of current and future generations." It is a governmental organization managed by a Board of Managers appointed by the county commissions of Anoka, Ramsey, and Washington Counties.

== See also ==
- List of Minnesota rivers
