= Interstate 694 =

Highway in Minnesota

Interstate 694
- I-694 highlighted in red

Route information
- Auxiliary route of I-94
- Maintained by MnDOT
- Length: 30.767 mi (49.515 km)
- Existed: 1970–present
- NHS: Entire route

Major junctions
- West end: I-94 / I-494 / US 52 in Maple Grove
- US 169 in Brooklyn Park; MN 100 in Brooklyn Center; I-94 in Brooklyn Center; MN 252 in Brooklyn Center; I-35W on the New Brighton–Arden Hills line; US 10 in Arden Hills; I-35E / US 10 in Little Canada; US 61 in Maplewood; MN 120 at Mahtomedi–Oakdale; MN 36 in Oakdale–Pine Springs
- South end: I-94 / I-494 / US 12 at Woodbury–Oakdale

Location
- Country: United States
- State: Minnesota
- Counties: Hennepin, Anoka, Ramsey, Washington

Highway system
- Interstate Highway System; Main; Auxiliary; Suffixed; Business; Future; Minnesota Trunk Highway System; Interstate; US; State; Legislative; Scenic
← MN 610	→ MN 1

Interstate 694 (I-694) is an east–west auxiliary Interstate Highway located in the Minneapolis–Saint Paul metropolitan area in the US state of Minnesota. The western terminus of the route is at its junction with I-94, I-494, and US Highway 52 (US 52) in Maple Grove. The eastern terminus of I-694 is at its junction with I-94 and I-494 at the Woodbury–Oakdale city line. I-694 comprises the northern and northeastern portions of a beltway around the Twin Cities, with I-494 forming the remainder of the beltway. The speed limit is 60 mph (97 km/h). Interstate Highways outside of the loop in Minnesota may be signed as high as 70 mph (110 km/h) but can only reach 60 mph (97 km/h) inside the loop.

I-694 also interchanges with I-35W at New Brighton–Arden Hills and I-35E at Little Canada–Vadnais Heights. I-694 is also concurrent with I-94/US 52 for eight miles (13 km) from Maple Grove to Brooklyn Center. I-694 is 30.8 miles (49.6 km) in length.

== Route description ==
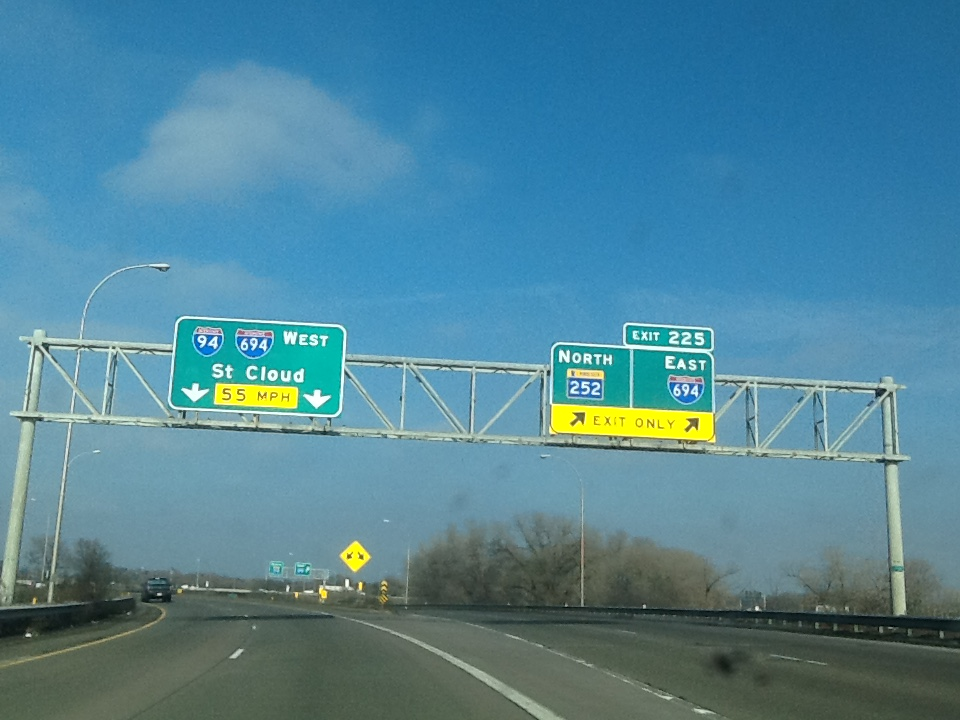
Interchange of eastbound I-94, MN 252 and eastbound I-694 in Brooklyn Center

I-694 begins on the counterclockwise end at the junction of I-94, I-494, US 52, and I-694 in the city of Maple Grove, often referred to as the Fish Lake Interchange. From the Fish Lake Interchange, I-694 travels eastbound (clockwise) and concurrently with I-94 and US 52 through the cities of Maple Grove, Brooklyn Park, and Brooklyn Center. In Brooklyn Center, I-94/US 52 splits from I-694 and then I-94/US 52 travels south toward downtown Minneapolis, while I-694 continues its beltway function, crossing the Mississippi River on the I-694 Bridge. The route then passes through the communities of Fridley and New Brighton, where it has an interchange with I-35W. I-694 turns slightly to the southeast as it passes through the communities of Arden Hills, Shoreview, and Little Canada. I-694 turns back to near due east at its western junction with I-35E. It continues east through the communities of Vadnais Heights, White Bear Lake, and Maplewood. In Pine Springs, I-694 has a cloverleaf interchange with Minnesota State Highway 36 (MN 36). The I-694/MN 36 interchange makes out a rough corner, in which I-694 switches direction from eastbound to southbound. I-694 continues south through the city of Oakdale and finally terminates on the clockwise end at the interchange of I-94, I-494, and I-694 at the Oakdale–Woodbury city boundary line. I-694 becomes I-494 after this interchange.

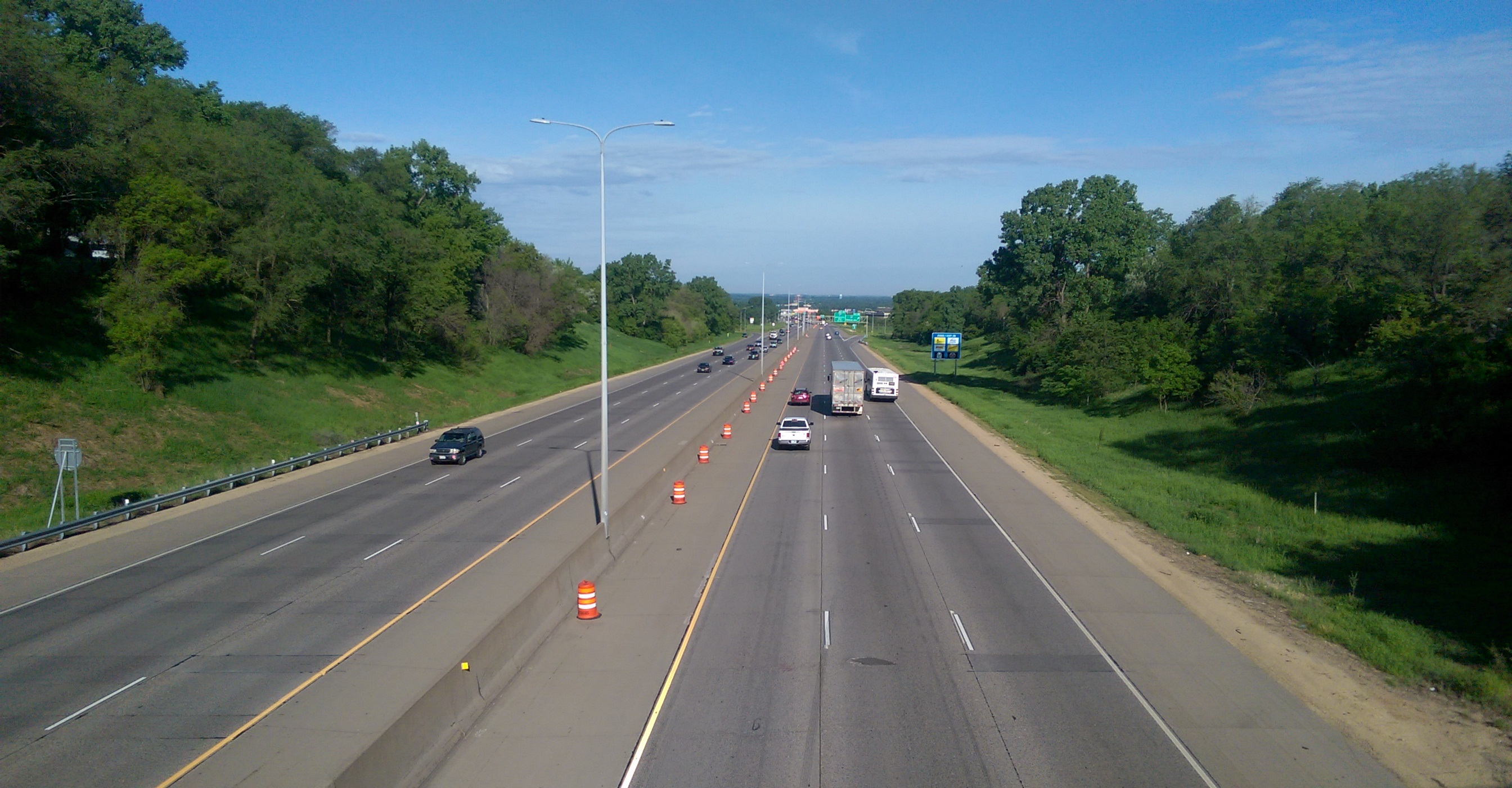
I-694 looking West through Fridley

Mileposts on I-694 are numbered to increase while traveling eastbound (clockwise). They are in sequence with the numbering of adjoining I-494, where the numbering begins and ends at the Minnesota River. Between Maple Grove and Brooklyn Center, the mileposts correspond to the beltway numbering, not I-94 mileage.

Legally, the route of I-694 is defined as part of unmarked legislative route 393 in the Minnesota Statutes §161.12(5). I-694 is not marked with this legislative number along the actual highway. The entire freeway, as part of the Interstate Highway System, has been included in the National Highway System, a system of roads important to the country's economy, defense, and mobility.

== History ==
The original beltway around the Twin Cities was MN 100. The portion of I-694 running east from the current MN 100 in Brooklyn Center through New Brighton and MN 100 was part of that original beltway. There was a two-lane bridge across the Mississippi river where the current I-694 bridge is today. That bridge was constructed as part of a defense initiative authorized in 1942 at the beginning of US involvement World War II.

The construction of I-694 to Interstate standards was authorized in 1956. The first section of I-694 completed was between US 10 at Arden Hills to I-35E at Little Canada in the early 1960s. The last section of I-694 completed was between I-35E at Little Canada to its junction with I-94 and I-494 at Oakdale–Woodbury, completed by the early 1970s.

I-694 was built as the main thoroughfare for the northern suburbs of Minneapolis–Saint Paul. These include the cities of Maple Grove, Brooklyn Park, Brooklyn Center, Fridley, New Brighton, Arden Hills, Shoreview, Little Canada, Vadnais Heights, White Bear Lake, Maplewood, Pine Springs, and Oakdale.

The original design of I-694 had problems with "weave" interchanges. The Unweave the Weave construction project, completed between 2004 and 2008, disentangled I-694 and I-35E at Little Canada–Vadnais Heights. The project was designed around several factors, a few of which included increasing freeway traffic capacity, increasing driver safety, and eliminating weaving and lane changes (eliminating "geometric deficiencies"), hence the name of the project, "Unweave the Weave". This weaving was the case for most drivers prior to 2005, before most of the road reconstruction work on the interchanges was done. As a result of lane changing and constant congestion, many accidents occurred on the interchange after its completion in the early 1970s. The current layout of the two Interstates now provides for safer exits and entrances, minimal congestion, and better road surface durability. The project also realigned the two interstates to improve the infrastructure of the highway from an asphalt surface to a complete concrete surface. Numerous bridges were rebuilt, including the residential streets of Edgerton Street and Labore Road in Vadnais Heights.

The Minnesota Department of Transportation (MnDOT) updated the overlapped section between I-694 and I-35E to increase the number of lanes from six (three in each direction) to 12 (six in each direction) and eliminated the requirement to change lanes through the area. The section was rebuilt in concrete instead of asphalt and noise walls were added.

Another construction project, the I-35W/US 10/I-694 North Central Corridor Reconstruction Project, also designed to reduce unnecessary traffic crossovers on the highway, began in September 2011. This project eliminated the weaving movements of I-694 at its interchange with US 10 and MN 51 in Arden Hills. This interchange often created one of the worst bottlenecks in the Twin Cities because drivers need to change at least one lane to continue either direction on I-694 between MN 51 (Snelling Avenue) and US 10. When the construction project was completed, the roadway of I-694 included two through lanes in each direction from I-35W at New Brighton to US 10 at Arden Hills, three through lanes in each direction from US 10 in Arden Hills to Rice Street at Shoreview–Little Canada, and five through lanes in each direction from Rice Street to the I-694/I-35E interchange, compared with the two to three lanes throughout the I-694 corridor. Construction on the North Central Corridor project began the week of September 19, 2011. Work was completed in November 2013, at an estimated cost of $185.5 million (equivalent to $246 million in 2024).

== Exit list ==
Exit numbers continue from I-494.

County	Location	mi	km	Exit	Destinations	Notes
Hennepin	Maple Grove	27.366– 27.969	44.041– 45.012		I-494 south	MNDOT signs this as counterclockwise terminus of I-694; clockwise terminus of I-494
Hennepin	Maple Grove	27.366– 27.969	44.041– 45.012	27	I-94 west / US 52 north – St. Cloud	West end of I-94/US 52 overlap; I-94 exit 216
Hennepin	Maple Grove	28.460– 28.493	45.802– 45.855	28	CSAH 61 (Hemlock Lane)	
Hennepin	Brooklyn Park	29.979	48.247	29	US 169	Signed as exits 29A (south) and 29B (north)
Hennepin	Brooklyn Park	30.529	49.132	30	Boone Avenue	
Hennepin	Brooklyn Park	31.454	50.620	31	CSAH 81 (Bottineau Boulevard)	
Hennepin	Brooklyn Center	33.479	53.879	33	CSAH 152 (Brooklyn Boulevard)	
Hennepin	Brooklyn Center	34.770	55.957	34	Shingle Creek Parkway	Eastbound exit spilt from I-94 east
Hennepin	Brooklyn Center	35.248– 35.272	56.726– 56.765	35B	I-94 east / US 52 south – Minneapolis	East end of I-94/US 52 overlap; eastbound exit and westbound entrance
Hennepin	Brooklyn Center	35.248– 35.272	56.726– 56.765	35A	MN 100 south	Eastbound exit and westbound entrance; northern terminus of MN 100
Hennepin	Brooklyn Center	35.248– 35.272	56.726– 56.765	35B	I-94 east / US 52 south	Westbound exit and eastbound entrance; I-94 exit 225
Hennepin	Brooklyn Center	35.815	57.639	35C	MN 252 / Great River Road (National Route)	Western end of Great River Road overlap
Mississippi River				I-694 Bridge		
Anoka	Fridley	36.219	58.289	36	CSAH 1 (East River Road) / Great River Road (National Route)	Eastern end of Great River Road overlap
Anoka	Fridley	36.938	59.446	37	MN 47 (University Avenue)	
Anoka	Fridley	37.712	60.692	38	MN 65 (Central Avenue)	
Ramsey	New Brighton	39.157	63.017	39	CSAH 44 (Silver Lake Road)	
Ramsey	New Brighton	39.956	64.303	40	CSAH 45 (10th Street)	
Ramsey	New Brighton	40.762	65.600	41	I-35W	Signed as exits 41A (south) and 41B (north); I-35W exits 26B-C (formerly signed as exits 27A-B); cloverleaf interchange
Ramsey	Arden Hills	41.874	67.390	42B	MN 51 south (Snelling Avenue)	Eastbound exit and westbound entrance; access via US 10
Ramsey	Arden Hills	42.333	68.128	42A	US 10 west – Anoka	West end of US 10 overlap; westbound exit and eastbound entrance
Ramsey	Arden Hills–Shoreview line	42.787	68.859	42C	CSAH 51 (Lexington Avenue)	
Ramsey	Shoreview	43.586	70.145	43	CSAH 52 (Victoria Street)	
Ramsey	Shoreview			45	CSAH 49 (Rice Street)	Diverging Diamond Interchange
Ramsey	Little Canada	46.417	74.701	46	I-35E south / US 10 east – St. Paul	East end of US 10 overlap; west end of I-35E overlap; I-35E exit 113 northbound
Ramsey	Vadnais Heights	47.067	75.747	47	I-35E north – Duluth	East end of I-35E overlap; I-35E exits 113-114 southbound
Ramsey	White Bear Lake–Maplewood line	48.483	78.026	48	US 61	
Ramsey	White Bear Lake–Maplewood line	49.665– 49.695	79.928– 79.976	50	CSAH 65 (White Bear Avenue)	
Ramsey–Washington county line	Mahtomedi	51.312	82.579	51	MN 120 (Century Avenue)	
Washington	Pine Springs	52.491	84.476	52	MN 36 – North St. Paul, Stillwater	Signed as exits 52A (west) and 52B (east)
Washington	Oakdale	54.743	88.100	55	CSAH 14 (34th Street North)	Former MN 5
Washington	Oakdale	57.123	91.931	57	CSAH 10 (10th Street North)	
Washington	Oakdale–Woodbury line	58.101– 58.133	93.504– 93.556	58	I-94 / US 12 – St. Paul, Eau Claire	Signed as exits 58A (west) and 58B (east); I-94 exit 249
Washington	Woodbury	58.101– 58.133	93.504– 93.556		I-494 south	Clockwise terminus of I-694; counterclockwise terminus of I-494
1.000 mi = 1.609 km; 1.000 km = 0.621 mi: Concurrency terminus; Incomplete access
