= Jon Melander =

American football player (born 1966)

No. 64, 62
- Position: Guard

Personal information
- Born: October 5, 1966 (age 60); Fridley, Minnesota, U.S.
- Listed height: 6 ft 7 in (2.01 m)
- Listed weight: 280 lb (127 kg)

Career information
- High school: Fridley
- College: Minnesota
- NFL draft: 1990: 5th round, 113th overall pick

Career history
- New England Patriots (1990–1991); Cincinnati Bengals (1992); Denver Broncos (1993–1994)

Career NFL statistics
- Games played: 54
- Games started: 32
- Stats at Pro Football Reference

Jon Melander (born October 5, 1966) is an American former professional football player who was an offensive guard for four seasons in the National Football League (NFL) with the New England Patriots, Cincinnati Bengals and Denver Broncos. He played college football for the Minnesota Golden Gophers and was selected in the fifth round of the 1990 NFL draft.

== College career ==
Melander played at the University of Minnesota from 1986 to 1989, starting as a defensive end before switching to guard just before his junior year. Melander earned a degree in business management with an emphasis in finance from the Carlson School of Management in 1989. From 2000 to 2004, Melander's nephew, Rian, was an All Big Ten offensive tackle for the Golden Gophers. His uncle, Raymond, also played football for the Gophers.

== Professional career ==
Melander was selected in the fifth round (113th overall) in the 1990 NFL draft by the New England Patriots. He played in ten games for the Patriots during the 1991 NFL season before signing with the Cincinnati Bengals before the 1992 NFL season. In 1992, Melander played in 15 games for the Bengals and started seven games. Melander signed with the Denver Broncos in the offseason and played in 29 games for the Broncos during the 1993 and 1994 NFL seasons. Melander started 22 games for the Broncos before retiring prior to the 1995 season.

== Personal life ==
Since retiring from football, Melander has worked as a financial consultant in the Twin Cities, specializing in asset management and retirement consulting for high-net-worth clients. In 2004, he was the President of the Minnetonka Rotary Club and is a past Rotary Assistant District Governor.

In addition to his career in finance, Jon volunteers his time coaching youth sports. He is also active in many church and community causes, and he remains an active Golden Gophers athletic booster.
