= L. Joseph Connors =

American politician, lawyer, and businessman (1930–2018)

Louis Joseph "Joe" Connors (March 4, 1930 – May 3, 2018) was an American politician, lawyer, and businessman.

== Biography ==
Connors was born in Brooklyn, New York City, New York. He graduated from University of Wisconsin in 1952 and from Columbia Law School in 1955. He served in the United States Air Force from 1955 to 1957. Connors worked as an attorney for the National Aeronautics and Space Administration. He also worked as a staff administrator for Honeywell. Connors lived in Fridley, Minnesota, with his wife and family. He served on the North Suburban Montessori School Board, Minnesota. Connors served in the Minnesota House of Representatives from 1971 to 1974 and was involved with the Democratic Party. Connors died at his home in Apex, North Carolina.
