= Little Canada, Minnesota =

City in Minnesota, United States

- City
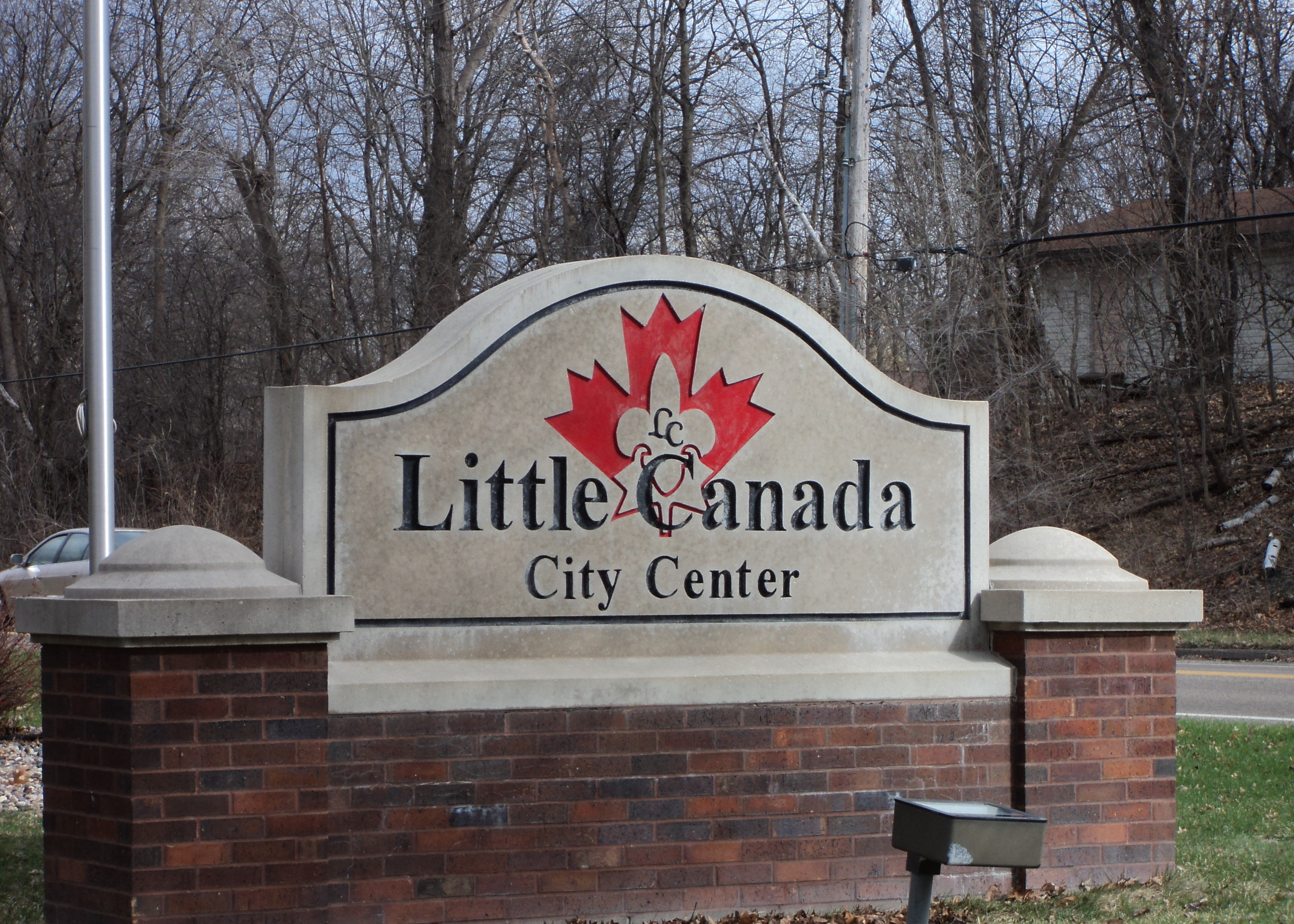

- Flag Icon

- Location of the city of Little Canada within Ramsey County, Minnesota

- Location of Little Canada in Minnesota Location of Little Canada in the United States
- Coordinates: 45°01′37″N 93°05′16″W
- Country: United States
- State: Minnesota
- County: Ramsey
- Founded: 1858
- Incorporated (village): 1953
- Incorporated (city): 1974

Government
  - Type: Minnesota Statutory City

Area
  - Total: 4.49 sq mi (11.62 km^{2})
  - Land: 3.90 sq mi (10.10 km^{2})
  - Water: 0.59 sq mi (1.52 km^{2})
- Elevation: 906 ft (276 m)

Population (2020)
  - Total: 10,819
  - Estimate (2021): 10,499
  - Density: 2,775.3/sq mi (1,071.56/km^{2})
- Time zone: UTC-6 (CST)
  - Summer (DST): UTC-5 (CDT)
- ZIP codes: 55109, 55117
- Area code: 651
- FIPS code: 27-37502
- GNIS feature ID: 2395733
- Website: www.littlecanadamn.org

Little Canada is a city in Ramsey County, Minnesota, United States. It is a second-ring suburb of Minneapolis-Saint Paul. The population was 10,819 at the 2020 census.

== History ==
In 1844, French Canadian settler Benjamin Gervais moved north from Saint Paul to claim land in order to build the first grist mill in Minnesota that was independent from the government. The large lake on the east side of Little Canada bears his name (Lake Gervais). The grist mill was converted into a park, which is recognized as the birthplace of the city. Little Canada began as the township of New Canada in 1858. In the 1950s, the township was threatened by the suburban sprawl of the ensuing larger communities that were formed, such as Maplewood. In 1953, the city leaders came together and established the village of Little Canada. It became a city in 1974.

=== Canadian ties ===
The city displays the Canadian influence in its history in several ways. Its official symbol is an initial LC on a white fleur-de-lis with a red maple leaf background, and the Canadian flag is displayed in council chambers.

In early August, the city hosts an annual celebration, Canadian Days, with its sister city Thunder Bay, Ontario, in Canada.

=== Sister city ===
- (Canada) Thunder Bay, Ontario since 1977

== Geography ==
According to the United States Census Bureau, the city has a total area of 4.48 square miles (11.60 km^{2}), of which 3.89 square miles (10.08 km^{2}) is land and 0.59 square miles (1.53 km^{2}) is water.

Interstate Highway 35E, Interstate Highway 694, and Minnesota Highway 36 are three of the main routes in the city. Nearby places include Maplewood, Roseville, Shoreview, Vadnais Heights, White Bear Lake, and Saint Paul.

Little Canada has a number of parks and trails, including Pioneer Park, Spooner Park, Gervais Mill Park, Nadeau Wildlife Park, and the upcoming Veterans Memorial Park.

== Demographics ==
Historical population
Census	Pop.	Note	%±
1960	3,512		—
1970	3,481		−0.9%
1980	7,102		104.0%
1990	8,971		26.3%
2000	9,771		8.9%
2010	9,773		0.0%
2020	10,819		10.7%
2021 (est.)	10,499		−3.0%
U.S. Decennial Census; 2020 Census

=== 2020 census ===
As of the 2020 census, Little Canada had a population of 10,819. The median age was 39.8 years. 20.6% of residents were under the age of 18 and 18.7% of residents were 65 years of age or older. For every 100 females there were 93.4 males, and for every 100 females age 18 and over there were 89.2 males age 18 and over.

100.0% of residents lived in urban areas, while 0.0% lived in rural areas.

There were 4,601 households in Little Canada, of which 26.6% had children under the age of 18 living in them. Of all households, 37.7% were married-couple households, 21.5% were households with a male householder and no spouse or partner present, and 32.6% were households with a female householder and no spouse or partner present. About 36.1% of all households were made up of individuals and 15.3% had someone living alone who was 65 years of age or older.

There were 4,814 housing units, of which 4.4% were vacant. The homeowner vacancy rate was 1.0% and the rental vacancy rate was 6.0%.

Racial composition as of the 2020 census
Race	Number	Percent
White	6,454	59.7%
Black or African American	1,126	10.4%
American Indian and Alaska Native	84	0.8%
Asian	1,735	16.0%
Native Hawaiian and Other Pacific Islander	3	0.0%
Some other race	628	5.8%
Two or more races	789	7.3%
Hispanic or Latino (of any race)	1,168	10.8%

=== 2010 census ===
As of the census of 2010, there were 9,773 people, 4,393 households, and 2,361 families living in the city. The population density was 2,512.3 inhabitants per square mile (970.0/km^{2}). There were 4,689 housing units at an average density of 1,205.4 per square mile (465.4/km^{2}). The racial makeup of the city was 74.6% White, 6.6% African American, 0.5% Native American, 13.1% Asian, 2.7% from other races, and 2.5% from two or more races. Hispanic or Latino of any race were 5.8% of the population.

There were 4,393 households, of which 24.4% had children under the age of 18 living with them, 38.7% were married couples living together, 10.7% had a female householder with no husband present, 4.3% had a male householder with no wife present, and 46.3% were non-families. 37.6% of all households were made up of individuals, and 13.6% had someone living alone who was 65 years of age or older. The average household size was 2.21 and the average family size was 2.96.

The median age in the city was 39.7 years. 19.5% of residents were under the age of 18; 10.9% were between the ages of 18 and 24; 25.4% were from 25 to 44; 29.3% were from 45 to 64; and 14.7% were 65 years of age or older. The gender makeup of the city was 47.8% male and 52.2% female.

=== 2000 census ===
As of the census of 2000, there were 9,771 people, 4,375 households, and 2,393 families living in the city. The population density was 2,445.8 inhabitants per square mile (944.3/km^{2}). There were 4,471 housing units at an average density of 1,119.1 per square mile (432.1/km^{2}). The racial makeup of the city was 85.38% White, 4.20% African American, 0.58% Native American, 6.68% Asian, 0.01% Pacific Islander, 0.90% from other races, and 2.25% from two or more races. Hispanic or Latino of any race were 2.29% of the population.

There were 4,375 households, out of which 26.0% had children under the age of 18 living with them, 41.6% were married couples living together, 10.1% had a female householder with no husband present, and 45.3% were non-families. 36.0% of all households were made up of individuals, and 11.1% had someone living alone who was 65 years of age or older. The average household size was 2.23 and the average family size was 2.96.

In the city, the population was spread out, with 22.1% under the age of 18, 11.0% from 18 to 24, 31.2% from 25 to 44, 22.8% from 45 to 64, and 12.9% who were 65 years of age or older. The median age was 36 years. For every 100 females, there were 91.3 males. For every 100 females age 18 and over, there were 90.2 males.

The median income for a household in the city was $46,609, and the median income for a family was $61,082. Males had a median income of $41,205 versus $31,689 for females. The per capita income for the city was $25,624. About 4.6% of families and 5.5% of the population were below the poverty line, including 5.2% of those under age 18 and 3.4% of those age 65 or over.

== Government ==
Little Canada is a Minnesota "Plan-A" (Council/Administrator) statutory city with a five-member council including the mayor. Little Canada elects its mayor every two years in each statewide general election. Council members are elected at-large in a staggered cycle, two every two years. Terms are four years and also occur during statewide general elections.

In 2026, Little Canada elected its first Asian Council Member, Mike Mui.

== Education ==
Little Canada is served mostly by the Roseville Area School District (ISD 623) with a small section of the city north of Interstate 694 served by the White Bear Lake School District. The two schools within city limits are Little Canada Elementary and Roseville Area Middle School.

Frank B. Kellogg High School, named for Frank B. Kellogg, was in Little Canada. The Kellogg High School Chargers competed in the North Suburban Conference before the school closed in 1986 when it merged with Ramsey High School to become Roseville Area High School at the Ramsey school site while the former Kellogg High School campus became Roseville Area Middle School.

Steve Ulseth was a star hockey player at Frank B. Kellogg High School before starring on a championship University of Minnesota Gophers team and playing professionally. Gymnast Sunisa Lee trained at a gym in Little Canada.

== See also ==
- Little Canada (term)
