= Fridley, Minnesota =

City in Anoka County, Minnesota, USA

Fridley
- City
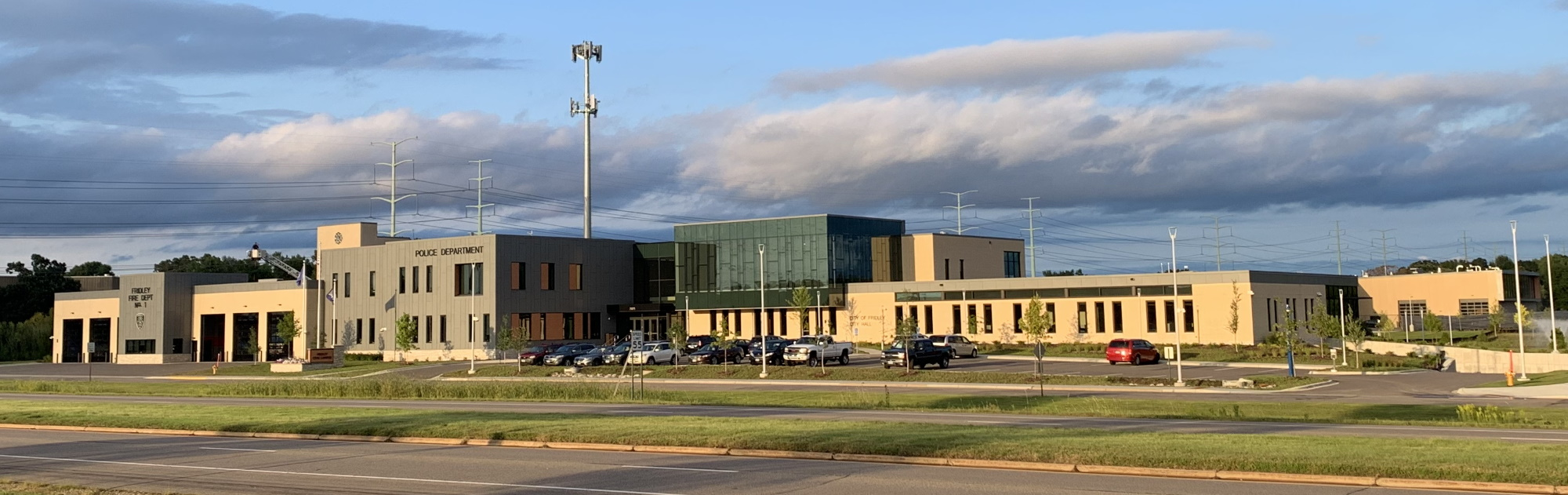
- Fridley Civic Campus
- Nickname: "Friendly Fridley"
- Interactive map of Fridley
- Coordinates: 45°05′03″N 93°15′24″W
- Country: United States
- State: Minnesota
- County: Anoka
- Incorporated (village): June 18, 1949
- Incorporated (city): May 23, 1957

Government
  - Type: Council–manager

Area
  - Total: 10.88 sq mi (28.18 km^{2})
  - Land: 10.16 sq mi (26.32 km^{2})
  - Water: 0.72 sq mi (1.86 km^{2})
- Elevation: 850 ft (260 m)

Population (2020)
  - Total: 29,590
  - Estimate (2022): 30,289
  - Density: 2,911.4/sq mi (1,124.08/km^{2})
- Time zone: UTC-6 (Central)
  - Summer (DST): UTC-5 (CDT)
- ZIP codes: 55421, 55432
- Area code: 763
- FIPS code: 27-22814
- GNIS feature ID: 2394826
- Website: www.fridleymn.gov

Fridley is a city in Anoka County, Minnesota, United States. Its population was 29,590 at the 2020 census. It was first settled as a place named Manomin where Rice Creek flows into the Mississippi river and the Red River Oxcart trail crosses the creek. Fridley was incorporated in 1949 as a village and became a city in 1957. It is part of the Minneapolis–Saint Paul metropolitan area as a northern "first-ring" or "inner-ring" suburb. Most of the growth in Fridley occurred between 1950 and 1970. Fridley borders Minneapolis to the southwest. Neighboring first-ring suburbs are Columbia Heights to the south and Brooklyn Center to the west, across the Mississippi River.

== Geography and climate ==
According to the United States Census Bureau, the city has an area of 10.89 square miles (28.20 km^{2}), of which 10.17 square miles (26.34 km^{2}) are land and 0.72 square miles (1.86 km^{2}) is covered by water.

The city lies within a narrow portion of the southernmost part of Anoka County. It is longer north–south along the path of the Mississippi River, and the highways that follow the river. It is narrower east/west in the portion between the Mississippi River and Spring Lake Park.

Fridley borders the cities of Coon Rapids and Blaine to the north; Spring Lake Park to the northeast; Mounds View and New Brighton to the east; Columbia Heights to the southeast; Minneapolis to the southwest; and Brooklyn Park and Brooklyn Center to the west.

Fridley is at the southern edge of the Anoka Sand Plain. Lakes in Fridley include East Moore Lake, West Moore Lake, and Locke Lake. Rice Creek flows through the central part of the city, Springbrook Creek through the northwest section, and the Mississippi River borders Fridley to the west. Parts of islands in the Mississippi River, including the Islands of Peace and Banfill Island, are within the city.

=== Climate ===
Fridley shares its climate with nearby Minneapolis. It has a hot-summer humid continental climate zone (Dfa in the Köppen climate classification), typical of southern parts of the Upper Midwest, and is situated in USDA plant hardiness zone 4b. As is typical in a continental climate, the difference between average temperatures in the coldest winter month and the warmest summer month is great: 60.1 °F (33.4 °C).

== History ==
=== 19th century ===
Fridley's post-European/American settlement history began with the construction of the Red River Trails Woods trail for the Red River ox carts in 1844. The trail traveled through Minnesota Territory from St. Paul to Pembina in present-day North Dakota. It was used to transport furs to the south and other supplies to Red River Valley settlers in the north. The East River Road (Anoka County Highway 1) follows this route today within Fridley, from the border with Minneapolis to the border with Coon Rapids.

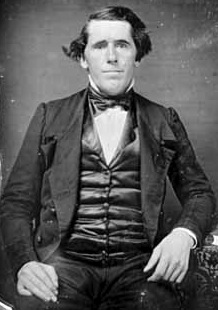
Abram M. Fridley, for whom the city is named.

In 1847, John Banfill became the first settler in the township area, which was known at the time as Manomin. Manomin is a variant spelling of manoomin, the Ojibwe word for wild rice, a staple of their diet. It comprised the modern-day municipalities of Columbia Heights, Fridley, Hilltop, and Spring Lake Park. The Banfill Tavern was built in 1847.

The area soon grew quickly in size. In 1851, Banfill platted the actual town of Manomin. There, a general store and sawmill were built next to Rice Creek, named after Henry Mower Rice, a settler who two years earlier had acquired land in the area. In 1853, the first town post office was in operation, and a year later, a ferry crossing the Mississippi River was established.

In 1855, Abram M. Fridley, for whom the city is named, was elected as the first territorial representative for the area.

In 1857, the area separated from Ramsey County; Manomin County was established, and it became the smallest county in the nation, with only 18 sections. This distinction was short-lived; it was annexed by Anoka County in 1870 and became a township with the same name.

The Saint Paul and Pacific Railroad, which joined St. Paul to St. Anthony across from Minneapolis in 1862, began extending rail to Anoka, reaching it through Fridley in 1864.

In 1879, the Minnesota Legislature, of which Abram Fridley was still a member, changed the township's name to bear his name.

=== 20th century ===
In 1949, Fridley Township voted to be incorporated as the Village of Fridley. The Fridley Free Press was also established. Northern Pump, whose factory was within the village's boundaries, sued to challenge the village's incorporation. This caused the village funds to be frozen. Minnesota state law allowed cities to operate municipal liquor stores after Prohibition ended. Fridley's liquor store proceeds were the primary funding for daily city operations until the lawsuit was resolved in 1950. Minnesota has both private liquor stores and city-owned municipal liquor stores. Fridley is the location of the headquarters of the Minnesota Municipal Beverage Association (MMBA), a lobbying coalition for municipalities with city-owned liquor stores. In conjunction with the Minnesota Licensed Beverage Association, it lobbied against Sunday liquor store sales in Minnesota until they were finally permitted in 2017.

The Totino's frozen pizza company opened a factory in Fridley in 1970 as it was growing to a national business. The business was sold to Pillsbury in 1975.

==== Growth ====
In 1957, the village became the City of Fridley, a "home rule charter city". City Hall, at 6431 University Avenue Northeast, has a fire station, city services and council meetings. A newer fire station was built in 1964. Fridley's population grew past 15,000 in the 1950s and peaked over 30,000 by the 1970s.

==== 1965 flood and tornadoes ====
Two of Fridley's worst disasters happened within weeks of each other. In April 1965, Minnesota was affected by a "500-year flood". The spring flood on the Upper Mississippi is still the flood of record for from about 100 miles north of Minneapolis to Hannibal, Missouri. The crests that April exceeded previous records by several feet at many river gauge sites. Those crests still exceed the second-highest crest by a foot or more at many of those sites. An ice jam rising 24 feet over the river broke up when it rammed a series of ice breakers above the Sartell Dam. The Riverview Heights area where Springbrook creek enters the river was severely flooded.

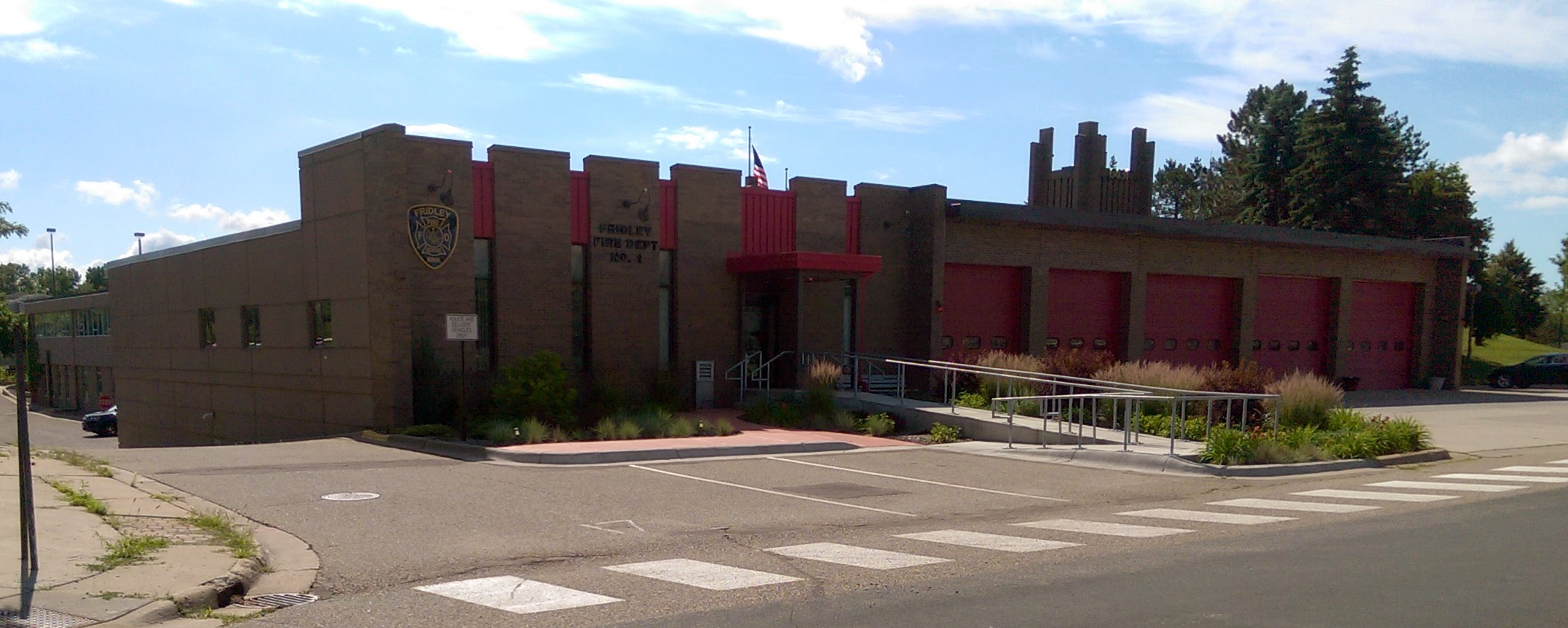
Former Fridley City Hall and Fire Station Number 1 in July 2017

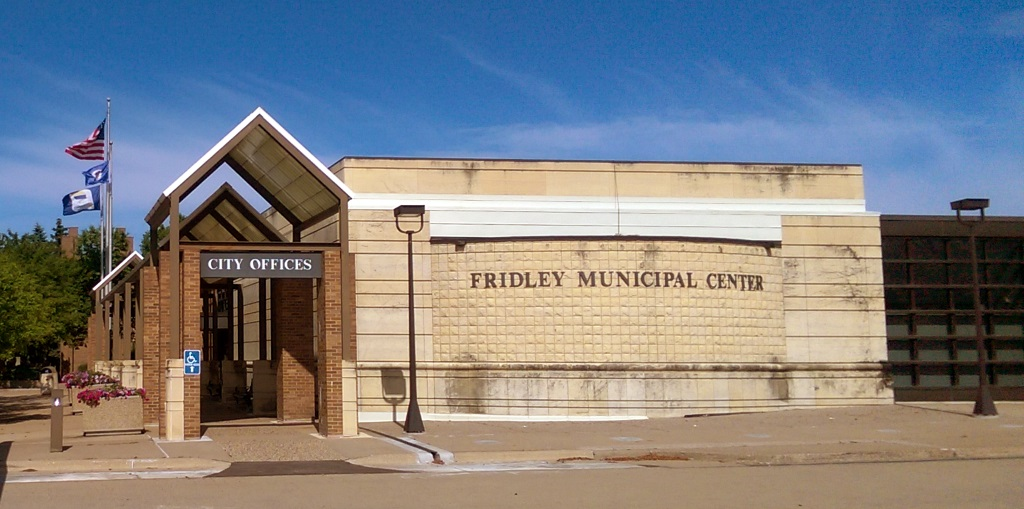
Former Fridley City hall in July 2017

On May 6, 1965, Fridley was hit by two F4 tornadoes. One of every four homes in the city was destroyed or damaged. The second twister to hit was the deadliest storm in Twin Cities history, killing 13 people. Parts of City Hall and the fire station were damaged.

==== Post disaster recovery ====
In 1967, a new Civic Center Building opened at the City Hall location, with a plaza to the south. This building was remodeled in 1989 and demolished in 2019. The acreage around 73rd and (old) Central was purchased by growing Minneapolis-originated companies, Medtronic, Inc. and Onan Corporation, for manufacturing facilities.

==== Springbrook Nature Center and tornado ====
In 1970, Fridley began purchasing land that became the Springbrook Nature Center. On July 18, 1986, a widely photographed tornado spent 16 minutes in Springbrook Nature Center, destroying thousands of century-old trees and extensive areas of mature forest habitat. Well-known aerial footage of the tornado was filmed by a KARE 11 television news helicopter passing through the area.

=== 21st century ===
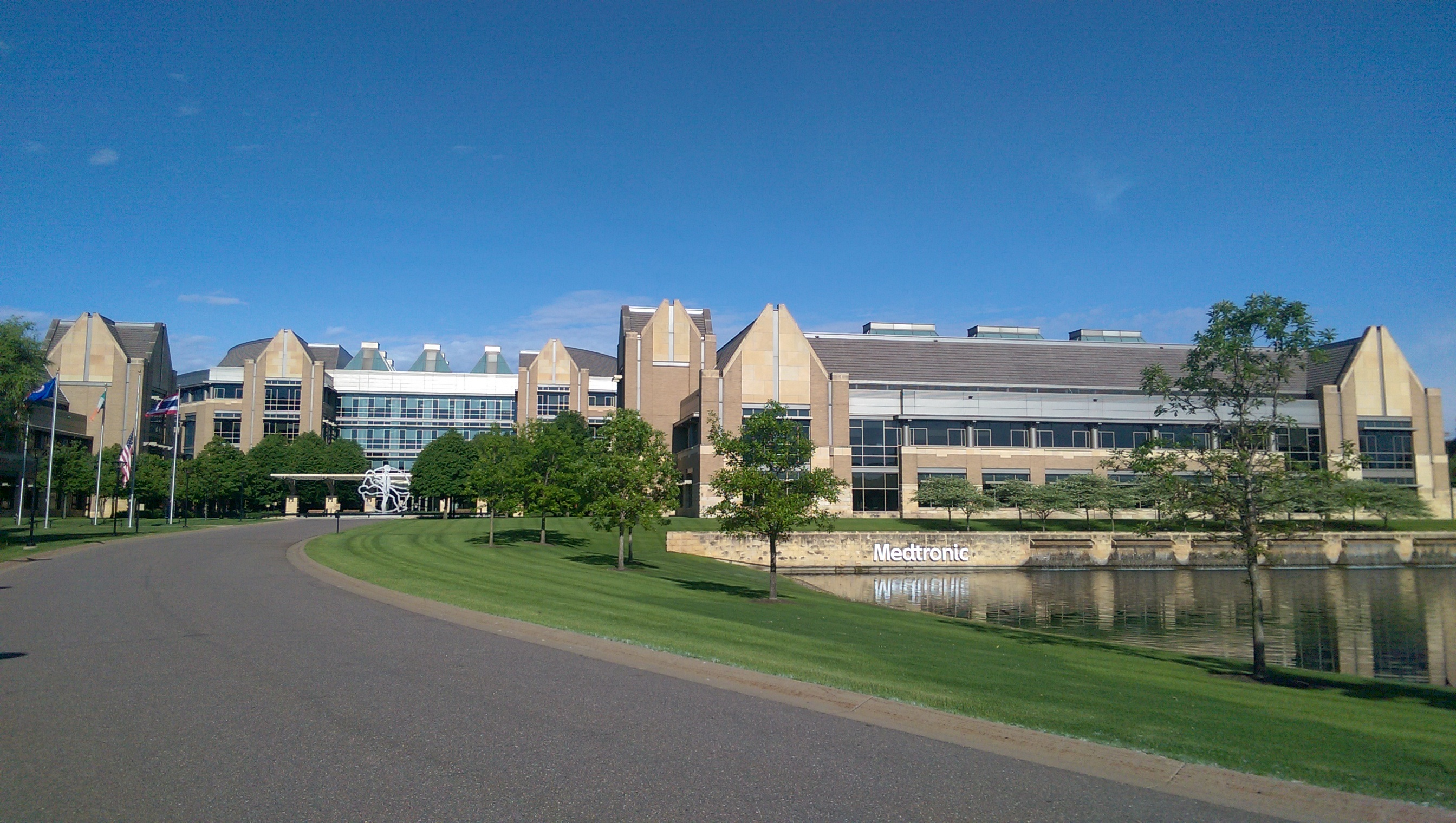
Medtronic Operational Headquarters is a major employer in Fridley.

In 2001, Medtronic opened its new World Headquarters on the site of the 100 Twin Drive-in at Interstate 694 and Minnesota Highway 65. As of 2019, it is still the Operational Headquarters for Medtronic, PLC, which reorganized as an Irish company in 2015.

On June 19, 2003, President George W. Bush visited the Micro Controls company in Fridley. He was promoting one of the tax relief changes made during his administration.

In the early 2000s, the Minnesota Sports Cafe was a notable venue for mixed martial arts competitions. Fighters who have claimed victories in Fridley include Sean Sherk, Nick Thompson, Brock Larson, Marcus LeVesseur, Brian Ebersole, and Harry Moskowitz.

On September 21, 2005, Fridley was struck by straight-line winds exceeding 80 mph (130 km/h), toppling many old growth trees as large as 2.5 feet (0.76 m) in diameter and destroying dozens of homes and several vehicles. Cleanup efforts took a week, leaving hundreds of residents stranded in their homes without power, unable to drive until streets were cleared of debris. The storm also affected Brooklyn Center, New Brighton, Brooklyn Park, Coon Rapids, Spring Lake Park, Blaine, and other communities in the surrounding North Metro area.

Fridley had one of the first six stations of the Northstar Commuter Rail line, which connected the northwest suburbs and downtown Minneapolis. The line opened in November 2009 and closed in January 2026. It was replaced by a bus service.

On July 17, 2011, heavy rains washed out the BNSF rail bridge over Rice Creek. A train derailed there and sent hopper cars containing corn into the creek. Traffic was rerouted for several days. In 2013, a jury awarded damages from BNSF to the train's engineer and conductor.

The Columbia Arena, filming location for the Disney Movie D3: The Mighty Ducks, was demolished in 2016 to make way for a new City Hall. This was controversial because it was expected to cost $50 million and increase homeowner taxes by 19%. The Fridley Civic Campus dedication at 7071 University Avenue NE was held on November 17, 2018. The staff had moved from the previous city hall over Veteran's Day weekend and began working there on November 12. The city council approved the project in December 2016 after nearly three years of studies, meetings and workshops. The council raised the levy to pay for the project, increasing city taxes about 16% for the average homeowner. A number of other Twin Cities suburbs updated their civic facilities during a 2018 "building boom of sorts", including Eagan, New Hope, Minnetonka, and Burnsville.

Fridley received an allocation of $1.52 million from the American Rescue Plan Act of 2021 (ARPA). The money was used to upgrade and repair its water distribution system and wastewater and storm water infrastructure. The city plans in 2022 to use the next allocation of $1.52 million to improve security at water treatment plants, rebuild its water distribution system, and on sanitary sewer and water quality projects.

President Joe Biden visited the Cummins plant in Fridley on April 3, 2022, as part of his "Investing in America" tour. Cummins had announced a $1 billion initiative to produce clean energy technology, including electrolyzers for hydrogen cells in Fridley.

== Economy ==
Fridley is home to the Operational (formerly World) Headquarters of Ireland-based Medtronic plc. Medtronic also has a substantial Rice Creek business campus. Other major employers in Fridley include BAE Systems (formerly United Defense), Cummins, Unity Medical Center, part of the Allina Healthcare system, part of the Mercy Hospitals, Minco Products, Inc, and Kurt Manufacturing Company. Fridley is also home to a Target Stores retail distribution center. Magnum Research, a company that produces the Desert Eagle firearm, had its headquarters in Fridley until 2010.

Minneapolis and Saint Paul draw their municipal water supplies from the Mississippi River at Fridley, which is upstream. The City of Minneapolis Waterworks plant and Fire Department training facility are in Fridley.

In the 2000 census data, there were 11,542 more jobs in Fridley than the number of workers age 16 and over. But most Fridley residents work outside Fridley, most commonly in other cities in Hennepin County and in Minneapolis. Only 21% of the 15,221 Fridley residents in the workforce in 2000 worked in Fridley. Fridley saw a decline in the number of jobs from 26,763 in 2000 to 23,845 in 2006, according to the city economic plan report.

=== Largest employers ===
According to the City's 2021 Comprehensive Annual Financial Report, the largest employers in the city are:

#	Employer	# of Employees
1	Medtronic	3,366
2	Target	1,301
3	Unity Medical Center	1,215
4	Cummins Power (Onan)	1,099
5	Minco Products	592
6	Fridley Public Schools ISD #14	564
7	BAE Systems	550
8	Kurt Manufacturing	275
9	Taylor Communications	250
10	Walmart	212

== Education ==
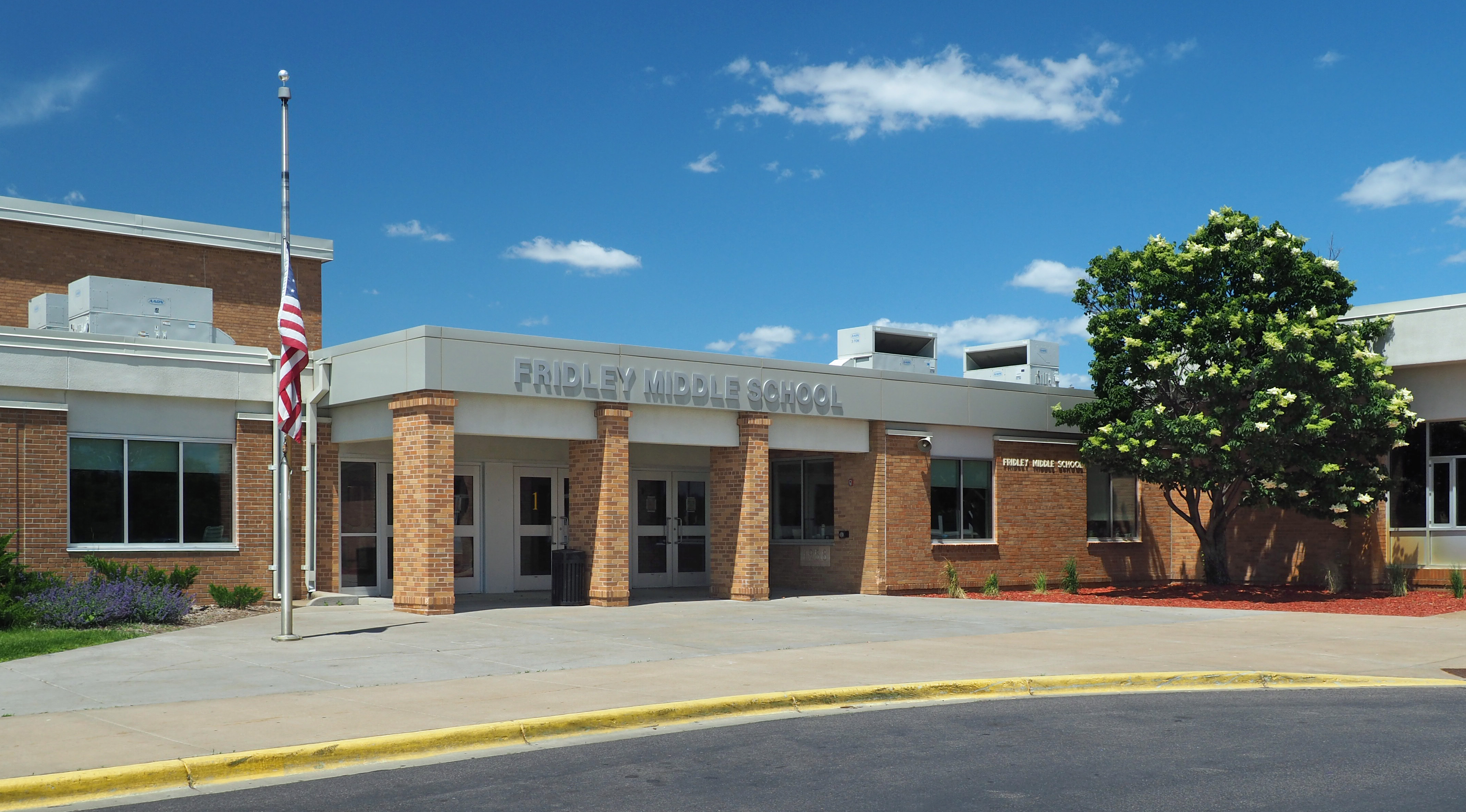
Fridley Middle School

Fridley's public schools are governed by Fridley Independent School District 14. Fridley High School, Fridley Middle School, Hayes Elementary School, and Stevenson Elementary School comprise the district. In 1978, Fridley closed three elementary schools due to declining enrollment: Gardena, Riverwood, and Parkview. Riverwood Elementary was demolished and single-family homes were developed. Parkview Elementary became the Fridley Community Center. Gardena Elementary became the Al-Amal School. Rice Creek Elementary closed later and was demolished, with single-family homes developed in its place. After the 1965 tornado, students at Parkview had to double up at the Riverwood school while it was being rebuilt.

Totino-Grace High School, a private Roman Catholic high school; Calvin Christian High School, a private Christian high school; and Al-Amal School, a private Islamic K-12 school, are also in Fridley.

A small part of northern Fridley is in Anoka-Hennepin School District 11. Students living in an area of eastern Fridley are in Columbia Heights School District 13. North Park Elementary is in Fridley. Most students living in north-northeastern Fridley are in Spring Lake Park School District 16. A District 16 elementary school, Woodcrest Spanish Immersion, is in Fridley.

== Parks and recreation ==
Fridley is home to the 127-acre (0.51 km^{2}) Springbrook Nature Center park and nature reserve on its northern border with Coon Rapids. The total Fridley city park space is 316 acres (1.28 km^{2}). There are baseball and softball diamonds, football and soccer fields, basketball courts, and tennis courts for sports. In the winter there are outdoor ice skating rinks with warming houses. The western border of Fridley comprises the Mississippi National River and Recreation Area. Parts of islands in the recreation area are within Fridley's city limits.

Fridley has the following Anoka County parks:

- Manomin County Park (Rice Creek where it enters the Mississippi River and Locke Lake)
- Rice Creek West/Locke Park and Regional Trail (Rice Creek)
- Islands of Peace County Park (Mississippi River)
- Anoka County Riverfront Regional Park (Mississippi River)

== Infrastructure and transportation ==
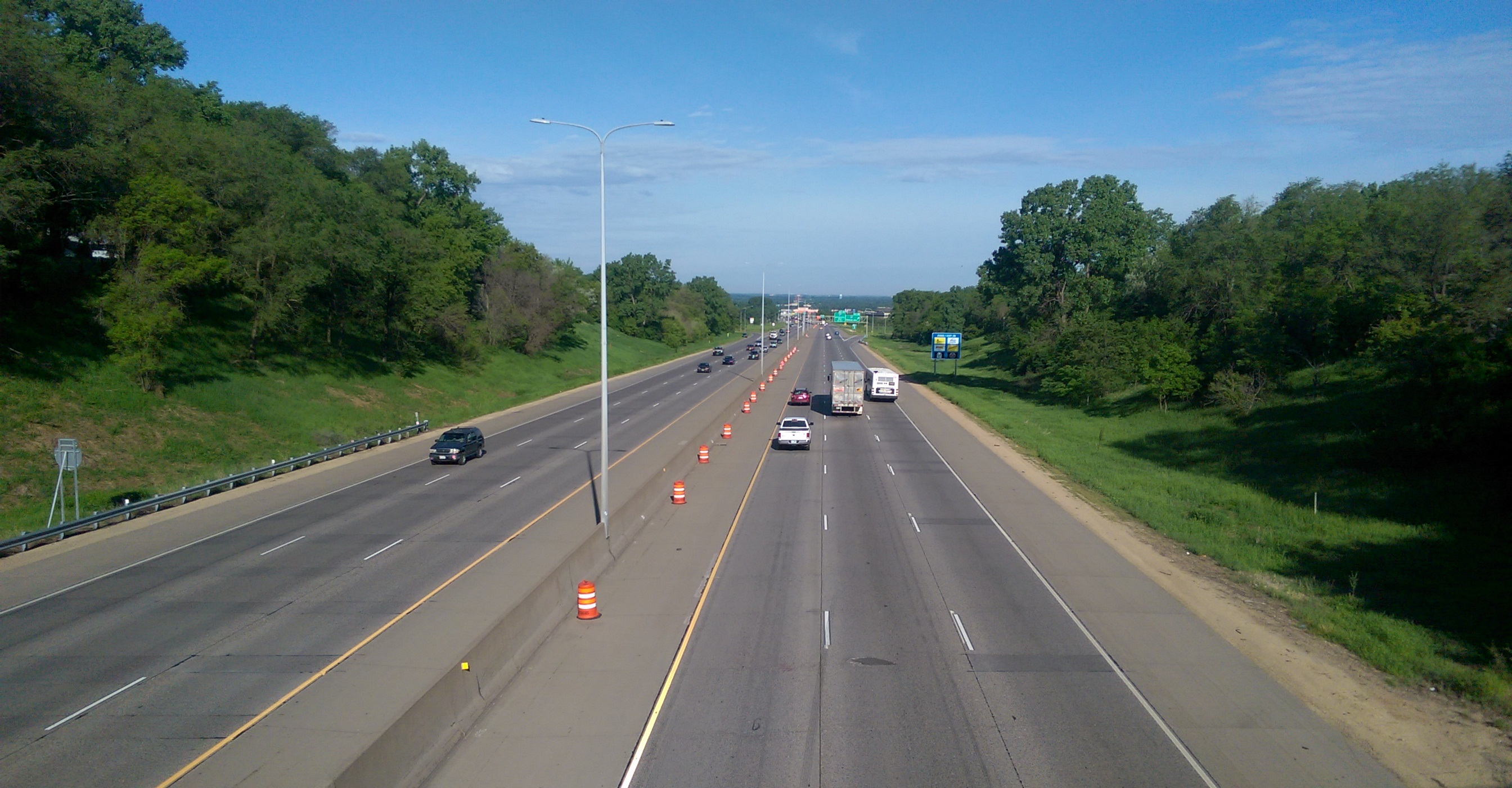
Interstate 694 looking West through Fridley

Interstate 694 and Minnesota State Highways 47 and 65 are three of the main automobile routes in the city. East River Road is one of the oldest roads in the state as a Minnesota Territorial road. It was part of the Red River Trails Woods trail. The I-694 Bridge, joining Fridley to Brooklyn Center, is the only crossing of the Mississippi River within the city.

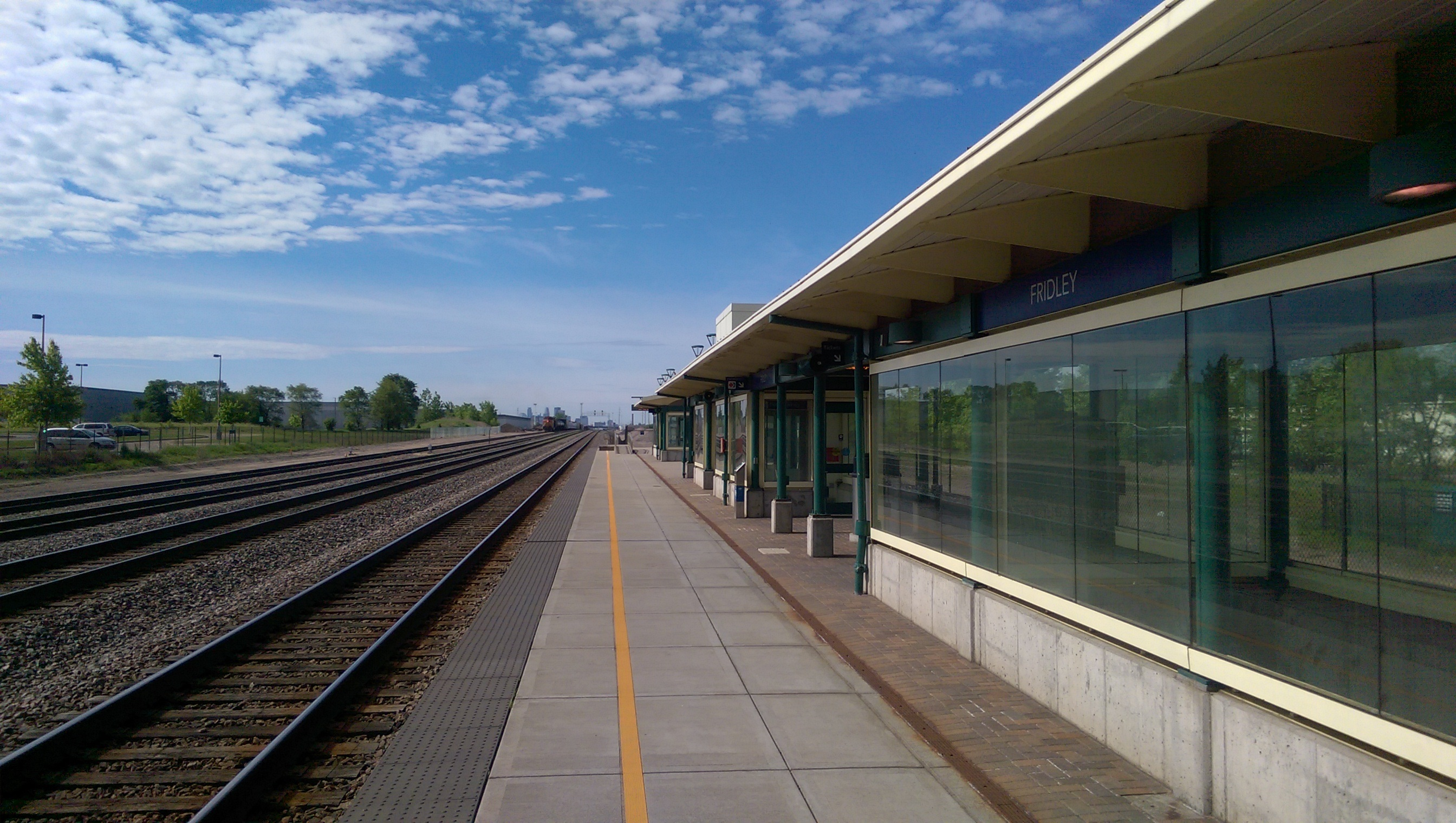
Platform of the Fridley Northstar station looking South towards Minneapolis

The BNSF Railway main Northern transcontinental Twin Cities to Portland/Seattle double track line passes through Fridley as part of the Staples Subdivision. The Fridley Station is served by the Northstar Commuter Rail line running on the BNSF tracks into Minneapolis. The Amtrak Empire Builder passes through Fridley twice daily on this line, but does not stop in the city. The massive BNSF Northtown Classification Yards are in the city. The Minnesota Commercial Railway also serves Fridley, with a terminal warehouse there.

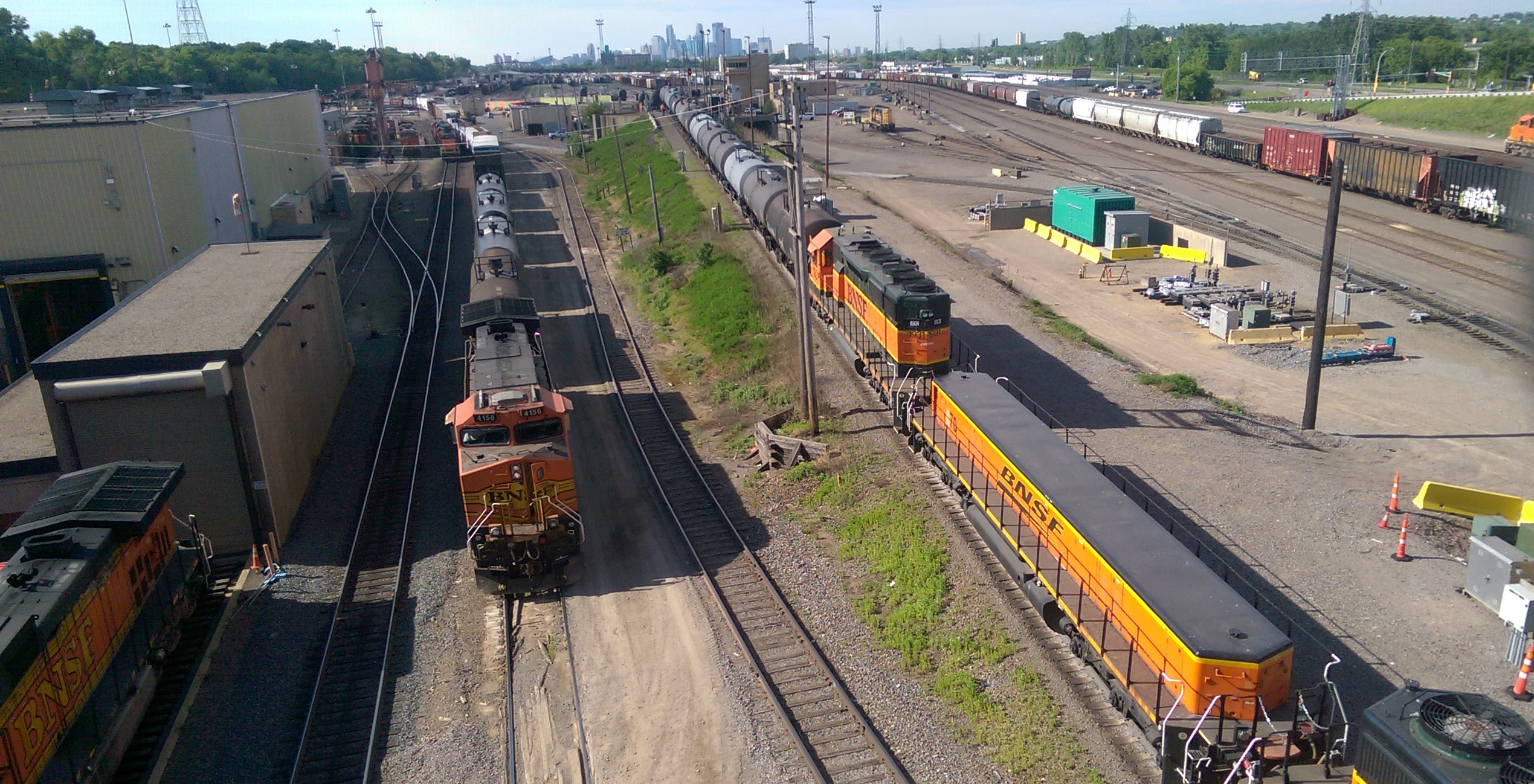
BNSF Northtown Classification Yard

The Mississippi River is non-navigable for barge traffic north of the Canadian Pacific Camden Place Rail Bridge, but small boats can travel upstream to the Coon Rapids Dam without a portage. There is a landing for small boats in the river near Interstate 694 at the Anoka County Riverfront Regional Park.

The Anoka County–Blaine Airport serves the area and is in neighboring Blaine.

== Nickname ==
Fridley has the nickname "Friendly Fridley". The nickname was spread further by a long-running series of advertisements on various radio stations for a local car dealer. The announcer directed people to "Friendly Chevrolet up in Friendly Fridley".

The city festival is named "49'er" days, which commemorates the 1949 incorporation. It is usually held in mid-June.

== Sister city ==
- Fourmies, Nord (France) - Medtronic plc has an assembly plant in Fourmies.

== Demographics ==
Historical population
Census	Pop.	Note	%±
1950	3,796		—
1960	15,173		299.7%
1970	29,233		92.7%
1980	30,228		3.4%
1990	28,335		−6.3%
2000	27,449		−3.1%
2010	27,208		−0.9%
2020	29,590		8.8%
2022 (est.)	30,289		2.4%
U.S. Decennial Census; 2020 Census

Historical population
Census	Pop.	Note	%±
1860	136		—
1870	103		−24.3%
1880	257		149.5%
1890	476		85.2%
1900	443		−6.9%
1910	523		18.1%
1920	533		1.9%
1930	693		30.0%
1940	1,392		100.9%
1950	2,279		63.7%
2020	29,590		—
U.S. Census for Fridley Township

=== 2020 census ===
As of the 2020 census, Fridley had a population of 29,590. The median age was 36.0 years. 23.2% of residents were under the age of 18 and 14.9% of residents were 65 years of age or older. For every 100 females there were 97.8 males, and for every 100 females age 18 and over there were 97.2 males age 18 and over.

100.0% of residents lived in urban areas, while 0.0% lived in rural areas.

There were 11,695 households in Fridley, of which 29.1% had children under the age of 18 living in them. Of all households, 40.6% were married-couple households, 22.4% were households with a male householder and no spouse or partner present, and 28.0% were households with a female householder and no spouse or partner present. About 29.9% of all households were made up of individuals and 10.8% had someone living alone who was 65 years of age or older.

There were 12,155 housing units, of which 3.8% were vacant. The homeowner vacancy rate was 0.8% and the rental vacancy rate was 5.0%.

Racial composition as of the 2020 census
Race	Number	Percent
White	17,387	58.8%
Black or African American	5,396	18.2%
American Indian and Alaska Native	309	1.0%
Asian	2,069	7.0%
Native Hawaiian and Other Pacific Islander	11	0.0%
Some other race	1,859	6.3%
Two or more races	2,559	8.6%
Hispanic or Latino (of any race)	3,282	11.1%

=== 2010 census ===
As of the census of 2010, there were 27,208 people, 11,110 households, and 7,057 families residing in the city. The population density was 2,675.3 inhabitants per square mile (1,032.9/km^{2}). There were 11,760 housing units at an average density of 1,156.3 per square mile (446.4/km^{2}). The racial makeup of the city was 75.2% White, 11.1% African American, 1.2% Native American, 4.9% Asian, 0.1% Pacific Islander, 3.4% from other races, and 4.2% from two or more races. Hispanic or Latino of any race were 7.3% of the population.

There were 11,110 households, of which 30.2% had children under the age of 18 living with them, 43.4% were married couples living together, 14.1% had a female householder with no husband present, 6.1% had a male householder with no wife present, and 36.5% were non-families. 28.8% of all households were made up of individuals, and 8.6% had someone living alone who was 65 years of age or older. The average household size was 2.44 and the average family size was 2.99.

The median age in the city was 37.1 years. 23.5% of residents were under the age of 18; 8.8% were between the ages of 18 and 24; 27.9% were from 25 to 44; 25.6% were from 45 to 64; and 14.2% were 65 years of age or older. The gender makeup of the city was 49.5% male and 50.5% female.

=== 2000 census ===
As of the census of 2000, there were 27,449 people, 11,328 households, and 7,317 families residing in the city. The population density was 2,701.3 inhabitants per square mile (1,043.0/km^{2}). There were 11,504 housing units at an average density of 1,132.1 per square mile (437.1/km^{2}). The racial makeup of the city was 88.65% White, 3.42% African American, 0.82% Native American, 2.89% Asian, 0.07% Pacific Islander, 1.23% from other races, and 2.93% from two or more races. Hispanic or Latino of any race were 2.56% of the population.

There were 11,328 households, out of which 28.2% had children under the age of 18 living with them, 48.6% were married couples living together, 11.6% had a female householder with no husband present, and 35.4% were non-families. 26.8% of all households were made up of individuals, and 6.3% had someone living alone who was 65 years of age or older. The average household size was 2.40 and the average family size was 2.91.

In the city, the population was spread out, with 22.5% under the age of 18, 10.2% from 18 to 24, 31.0% from 25 to 44, 24.4% from 45 to 64, and 12.0% who were 65 years of age or older. The median age was 36 years. For every 100 females, there were 97.8 males. For every 100 females age 18 and over, there were 96.7 males.

The median income for a household in the city was $48,372, and the median income for a family was $55,381. Males had a median income of $38,100 versus $29,997 for females. The per capita income for the city was $23,022. About 5.3% of families and 7.3% of the population were below the poverty line, including 11.9% of those under age 18 and 3.3% of those age 65 or over.

== Politics ==
Fridley has a council-manager government. David Ostwald is the mayor, first elected in 2024.

Fridley is in Minnesota's 5th congressional district, represented by Ilhan Omar, a Democrat.

== Notable people ==
- Joe Alt, National Football League offensive lineman
- Mikey Anderson, National Hockey League player
- Bill Antonello, Major League Baseball player
- Gordon Backlund, politician
- Connie Bernardy, politician
- Don Betzold, politician
- Satveer Chaudhary, politician
- L. Joseph Connors, politician
- Chris Dahlquist, National Hockey League player
- Ducky DooLittle, sex educator
- Brooke Elliott, actress
- Mike Erlandson, businessman
- Abram M. Fridley, politician and namesake of the city
- Thomas E. Greig, politician
- Sean Hjelle, Major League Baseball pitcher
- Melissa Hortman, politician
- Larry Hosch, politician
- Warren Johnson, NHRA drag racer
- Jon Melander, NFL player
- Donald Savelkoul, politician and lawyer
- Don Simensen, NFL player
- Wayne Simoneau, politician
- Tom Tillberry, politician
- Rose Totino, businesswoman
- Cory Wong, guitarist
