= Muldoon's =

Music venue and nightclub in Mounds View, Minnesota

Coordinates: 45.1225°N 93.2080°W

Muldoon's, sometimes called Muldoon's Off 10, was a music venue and nightclub located in Mounds View, Minnesota. It was particularly popular in the mid-1980s hosting bands such as UFO, Uriah Heep, Victory and Blue Öyster Cult.
