= Mounds View, Minnesota =

City in Minnesota, United States

- City
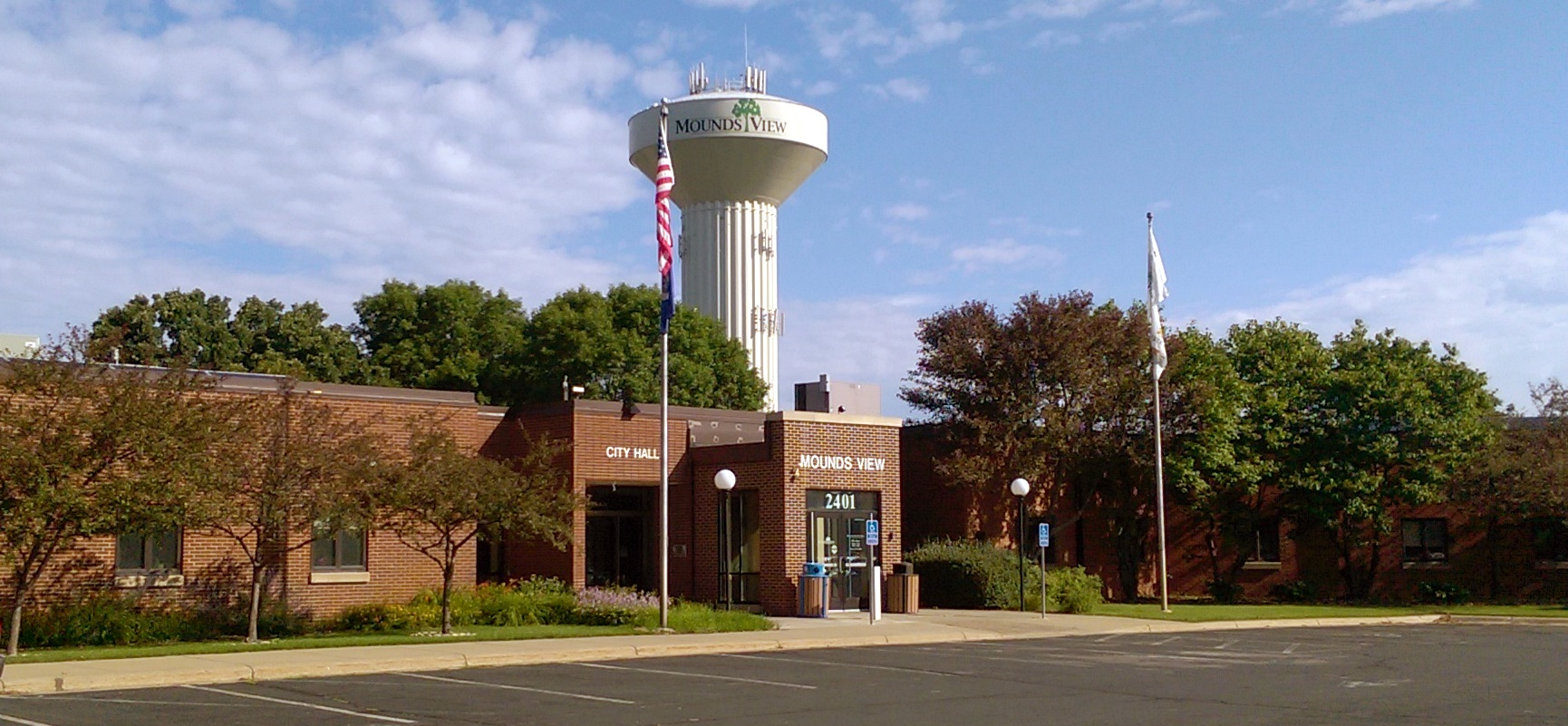
- Mounds View City Hall and water tower

- Logo
- Interactive map of Mounds View, Minnesota
- Location within Minnesota
- Coordinates: 45.1067°N 93.2068°W
- Country: United States
- State: Minnesota
- County: Ramsey
- Organized: May 11, 1858
- Incorporated: April 24, 1958

Government
  - Type: Mayor–Council
  - Mayor: Zach Lindstrom
  - Councilmembers: Gary Meehlhause; Julie Clark; Kathryn Smith; Sherry Gunn

Area
  - Total: 4.152 sq mi (10.754 km^{2})
  - Land: 4.057 sq mi (10.507 km^{2})
  - Water: 0.095 sq mi (0.247 km^{2}) 2.29%
- Elevation: 912 ft (278 m)

Population (2020)
  - Total: 13,249
  - Estimate (2025): 12,786
  - Density: 3,265.9/sq mi (1,261.0/km^{2})
- Time zone: UTC–6 (Central (CST))
  - Summer (DST): UTC–5 (CDT)
- ZIP Code: 55112
- Area code: 763
- FIPS code: 27-44530
- GNIS feature ID: 2395118
- Highways: US 10, CR 10, I-35W
- Website: moundsviewmn.gov

Mounds View is a city in Ramsey County, Minnesota, United States. The population was 13,249 as of the 2020 census, and was estimated at 12,786 in 2025. It is part of the Twin Cities Metropolitan Area.

U.S. Highway 10, County Road 10, and Interstate Highway 35W are three of the main routes in the city.

== History ==
The city of Mounds View is in the former Mounds View Township, which was organized in 1858. In 1958, 100 years after Minnesota became a state, the village of Mounds View was incorporated. Post-World War II growth was fueled by the proximity of the Twin Cities Army Ammunition Plant in Arden Hills on the city's eastern border.

While the city's residential areas started to develop north and south of County Road 10 after World War II, businesses emerged along the corridor starting in the 1950s. Former notable businesses along the corridor include the 1980s nightclub Muldoon's Off 10 and Totino's restaurant. Current notable businesses in Mounds View include Sysco Distributing and Mermaid Entertainment & Event.

On May 6, 1965, a tornado passed through Mounds View, killing six people and destroying 46 homes.

On July 8, 1986, a petroleum pipeline exploded in Mounds View. Two hundred people had to evacuate their homes and two people, a mother and daughter, were killed. The Minnesota Office of Pipeline Safety was created in 1987 in response to the tragedy.

In 1987, Mounds View became a Tree City USA-recognized Tree City.

In 2005, the Mounds View City Council voted to sell the city-owned golf course, "The Bridges of Mounds View", to Medtronic, to become its new campus. The campus opened in 2007 in the northeast corner of the city.

In 2016, the Mounds View City Council voted to change the name of County Road 10 to Mounds View Boulevard for the city’s portion of the road.

Before the Fair Housing Act of 1968, racial covenants excluded African Americans and other people of color from Mounds View. The unenforceable covenants remain in the deeds for over 500 houses. In 2024, Mayor Zach Lindstrom announced a draft ordinance that would require property owners to discharge these covenants before sale.

== Geography ==
According to the United States Census Bureau, the city has an area of 4.152 square miles (10.75 km^{2}), of which 4.057 square miles (10.51 km^{2}) is land and 0.095 square miles (0.25 km^{2}) (2.29%) is water.

Rice Creek flows through southeastern Mounds View.

Mounds View borders Shoreview, Arden Hills, New Brighton, Fridley, Spring Lake Park, and Blaine. The boundary between Ramsey and Anoka Counties makes up the city's northern and western boundaries.

== Demographics ==
Historical population
| Census | Pop. | Note | %± |
|---|---|---|---|
| 1960 | 6,416 | | — |
| 1970 | 10,599 | | 65.2% |
| 1980 | 12,593 | | 18.8% |
| 1990 | 12,541 | | −0.4% |
| 2000 | 12,738 | | 1.6% |
| 2010 | 12,155 | | −4.6% |
| 2020 | 13,249 | | 9.0% |
| 2025 (est.) | 12,786 | | −3.5% |
U.S. Decennial Census; 2020 Census

According to realtor website Zillow, the average price of a Mounds View home as of August 31, 2026, was $343,011.

As of the 2024 American Community Survey, there were 5,379 estimated households in Mounds View with an average of 2.39 persons per household. The city has a median household income of $90,009. Approximately 12.0% of the city's population lives at or below the poverty line. Mounds View has an estimated 69.7% employment rate, with 36.6% of the population holding a bachelor's degree or higher and 94.3% holding a high school diploma. There were 5,698 housing units at an average density of 1,404.49 per square mile (542.28/km^{2}).

The top five reported languages (people were allowed to report up to two languages, thus the figures will generally add to more than 100%) were English (80.3%), Spanish (5.5%), Indo-European (4.1%), Asian and Pacific Islander (8.4%), and Other (1.7%).

The median age in the city was 40.2 years.

Mounds View, Minnesota – racial and ethnic composition Note: the US Census treats Hispanic/Latino as an ethnic category. This table excludes Latinos from the racial categories and assigns them to a separate category. Hispanics/Latinos may be of any race.
| Race / ethnicity (NH = non-Hispanic) | Pop. 1980 | Pop. 1990 | Pop. 2000 | Pop. 2010 | Pop. 2020 |
|---|---|---|---|---|---|
| White alone (NH) | 9,144 (72.61%) | 12,036 (95.97%) | 11,390 (89.42%) | 9,634 (79.26%) | 8,758 (66.10%) |
| Black or African American alone (NH) | 12 (0.10%) | 71 (0.57%) | 300 (2.36%) | 648 (5.33%) | 1,248 (9.42%) |
| Native American or Alaska Native alone (NH) | 26 (0.21%) | 83 (0.66%) | 81 (0.64%) | 85 (0.70%) | 58 (0.44%) |
| Asian alone (NH) | 44 (0.35%) | 249 (1.99%) | 397 (3.12%) | 840 (6.91%) | 1,205 (9.10%) |
| Pacific Islander alone (NH) | — | — | 7 (0.05%) | 9 (0.07%) | 19 (0.14%) |
| Other race alone (NH) | 0 (0.00%) | 5 (0.04%) | 9 (0.07%) | 27 (0.22%) | 43 (0.32%) |
| Mixed race or multiracial (NH) | — | — | 220 (1.73%) | 301 (2.48%) | 660 (4.98%) |
| Hispanic or Latino (any race) | 54 (0.43%) | 97 (0.77%) | 334 (2.62%) | 611 (5.03%) | 1,258 (9.50%) |
| Total | 12,593 (100.00%) | 12,541 (100.00%) | 12,738 (100.00%) | 12,155 (100.00%) | 13,249 (100.00%) |

=== 2020 census ===
As of the 2020 census, there were 13,249 people, 5,207 households, and 3,400 families residing in the city. The population density was 3,265.71 inhabitants per square mile (1,260.90/km^{2}). There were 5,375 housing units at an average density of 1,324.87 per square mile (511.54/km^{2}). The racial makeup of the city was 67.63% White, 9.52% African American, 0.79% Native American, 9.16% Asian, 0.14% Pacific Islander, 5.46% from some other races and 7.30% from two or more races. Hispanic or Latino people of any race were 9.50% of the population.

=== 2010 census ===
As of the 2010 census, there were 12,155 people, 4,954 households, and 3,236 families residing in the city. The population density was 3,019.13 inhabitants per square mile (1,165.69/km^{2}). There were 5,221 housing units at an average density of 1,296.82 per square mile (500.71/km^{2}). The racial makeup of the city was 81.35% White, 5.46% African American, 0.76% Native American, 6.99% Asian, 0.07% Pacific Islander, 2.30% from some other races and 3.06% from two or more races. Hispanic or Latino people of any race were 5.03% of the population.

There were 4,954 households, of which 31.6% had children under the age of 18 living with them, 47.5% were married couples living together, 12.8% had a female householder with no husband present, 5.0% had a male householder with no wife present, and 34.7% were non-families. 27.8% of all households were made up of individuals, and 8.4% had someone living alone who was 65 years of age or older. The average household size was 2.45 and the average family size was 2.98.

The median age in the city was 37.8 years. 23.1% of residents were under the age of 18; 8.8% were between the ages of 18 and 24; 27.9% were from 25 to 44; 27.6% were from 45 to 64; and 12.6% were 65 years of age or older. The gender makeup of the city was 50.1% male and 49.9% female.

=== 2000 census ===
As of the 2000 census, there were 12,738 people, 5,018 households, and 3,387 families residing in the city. The population density was 3,096.56 inhabitants per square mile (1,195.59/km^{2}). There were 5,130 housing units at an average density of 1,247.08 per square mile (481.50/km^{2}). The racial makeup of the city was 90.65% White, 2.40% African American, 0.66% Native American, 3.12% Asian, 0.05% Pacific Islander, 1.02% from some other races and 2.09% from two or more races. Hispanic or Latino people of any race were 2.62% of the population.

There were 5,018 households, out of which 33.5% had children under the age of 18 living with them, 50.8% were married couples living together, 12.2% had a female householder with no husband present, and 32.5% were non-families. 23.9% of all households were made up of individuals, and 6.6% had someone living alone who was 65 years of age or older. The average household size was 2.53 and the average family size was 3.02.

In the city, the population was spread out, with 25.8% under the age of 18, 10.5% from 18 to 24, 32.4% from 25 to 44, 22.4% from 45 to 64, and 8.9% who were 65 years of age or older. The median age was 34 years. For every 100 females, there were 99.7 males. For every 100 females age 18 and over, there were 97.5 males.

The median income for a household in the city was $51,974, and the median income for a family was $60,685. Males had a median income of $37,418 versus $29,196 for females. The per capita income for the city was $24,271. About 4.4% of families and 5.9% of the population were below the poverty line, including 9.4% of those under age 18 and 5.2% of those age 65 or over.

== Schools ==
Calvin Academy, a private school for children with behavioral disabilities, relocated to the area in 1999. By 2005, it was no longer in operation. Since the 2014-2015 school year, the Mounds View Public Schools Area Learning Center has operated from Calvin Academy's former location.

Other Mounds View schools include public schools Edgewood Middle School and Pinewood Elementary School, both operated by Mounds View Public Schools.

== Notable people ==
- Micah Burton, soccer player
- Amanda Lee, naval aviator in the United States Navy
- Meghan Lorence, forward for the Minnesota Whitecaps
- Oliver Moore, hockey player.
