= Springbrook Nature Center =

Park and nature reserve located in Fridley, Minnesota

Coordinates: 45.12377°N 93.27458°W

Springbrook Nature Center is a 127-acre (0.51 km^{2}) park and nature reserve located in Fridley, Minnesota. Springbrook features an interpretive building, over three miles (5 km) of hiking trails through wooded and wetland areas, and various public shelters. The mission of Springbrook Nature Center is to preserve the integrity of and enable access to the natural resource base.

Throughout the year, Springbrook hosts various educational programs and community events. It receives approximately 150,000 visitors per year.

== History ==
In 1970, Fridley began purchasing land which would become the Springbrook Nature Center.

On July 18, 1986, a widely photographed tornado spent 16 minutes in Springbrook Nature Center, destroying thousands of century old trees and extensive areas of mature forest habitat. Well-known aerial footage of the tornado was filmed by a KARE 11 television news helicopter passing through the area.

A new interpretive center was dedicated on July 30, 2016. The Springbrook Nature Center Foundation raised (US)$5.5million towards the expansion.

Long-time (35 years) director, Siah St. Clair, provided many photos for a book, A Field Guide to the Natural World of the Twin Cities, published in 2018.

There was a monthly bird-banding conducted at the Nature Center from 1988 through 2023, when the program ended.

== Bibliography ==
- Moriarty, John J.; St. Clair, Siah L (2018). A Field Guide to the Natural World of the Twin Cities. Minnesota USA: University of Minnesota Press. ISBN 978-1-5179-0549-1. "Siah L. St. Clair was director of Springbrook Nature Center in Fridley, Minnesota, for thirty-five years. He serves on the board of directors of the Audubon Chapter of Minneapolis and has been involved in state and national environmental education and interpretation programs."
