= Thomas E. Greig =

American politician

Thomas Edgar Greig (September 12, 1921 – May 5, 2000) was an American businessman and politician.

Greig was born in Pine County, Minnesota and went to vocational school. He served in the United States Coast Guard during World War II. Greig lived in Fridley, Anoka County, Minnesota with his wife and family and was involved with the insurance business. He served as Mayor of Fridley, Minnesota. Greig then served in the Minnesota Senate from 1967 to 1970 and was a Republican. He then moved to Chisago City, Chisago County, Minnesota. Greig served on the Chisago County Commission from 1982 to 1990. He died from cancer at his home in Chisago City, Minnesota.
