= I-694 Bridge =

- Coordinates: 45°04′09″N 93°16′54″W
- Carries: Four lanes of I-694 westbound Four lanes of Interstate 694 eastbound
- Crosses: Mississippi River
- Locale: Brooklyn Center, Minnesota, Fridley, Minnesota
- Maintained by: Minnesota Department of Transportation
- ID number: 9321 (westbound); 27801 (eastbound)

Characteristics
- Design: Girder bridge
- Total length: 776 feet
- Width: 74 feet
- Longest span: 200 feet
- Clearance below: 43 feet

History
- Opened: 1963 (westbound); 1988 (eastbound)

The I-694 Bridge is a pair of girder bridges that spans the Mississippi River between the cities of Brooklyn Center and Fridley in Minnesota. The westbound bridge was built in 1963 by the Minnesota Department of Transportation, and widened in 1987 with a new structure above the piers. The eastbound bridge was built in 1988, also by the Minnesota Department of Transportation.

The former eastbound bridge was authorized in April 1942 at the beginning of World War II as a wartime construction link of Minnesota State Highway 100 to New Brighton, Minnesota. When Interstate 694 was built, the Highway 100 bridge was widened and used for the eastbound lanes, while a new bridge was built for the westbound lanes. The eastbound bridge, showing its age, was demolished in 1988 and a new bridge was built.

This bridge is Minnesota's second-busiest, carrying 150,000 cars per day. There is a sidewalk on the north side of the bridge allowing pedestrians and bicyclists to cross.

== See also ==
- List of crossings of the Upper Mississippi River
