= Minco Products =

Company

Minco
- Type: Private
- Industry: Electronic
- Founded: 1956
- Headquarters: Fridley, Minnesota, USA
- Key people: Dana Schurr, CEO
- Products: Flexible heaters, Thermal management, Flexible circuits, Temperature sensors and Temperature monitoring and control instrumentation
- Number of employees: 650
- Website: www.minco.com

Minco is a privately owned company with over 650 employees worldwide. Based in Fridley, Minnesota, the company designs and manufactures flexible printed circuit boards and interconnects, RTD based temperature sensors and assemblies, and thermal services for medical, defense, aerospace, industrial, and food service applications.

== Company history ==
Minco Products, Inc was founded by Karl Schurr on October 2, 1956, as an engineering firm, designing and building precision electromechanical devices on a subcontract basis. In 1958, the company decided to concentrate on the development of proprietary products. One of the first efforts was flexible wire-wound temperature sensors for aerospace guidance systems, which led to the development of flexible heaters, introduced by Minco in 1960.

Also during the 1960s & 1970s, the temperature sensor line was expanded to include industrial RTD probes, bearing sensors, and RTD stator sensors to which the company supplied to large rotating apparatus (generators) manufacturers (GE, Westinghouse, Reliance Electric, Brown Boveri) and energy management system contractors. The company’s heater product line also expanded into commercial, aerospace and medical applications. Minco's combination etched foil heater-platinum wire sensors were used on many NASA projects including the 1976 Viking Lander (heated soil samples) and Skylab (Inertial Guidance System). Of note, NASA investigated Minco due to the erratic gyros on Skylab causing spacewalks to replace the IGS. The heater-sensor was found not to be the problem. Minco also manufactured one of the first etched foil heaters for early "wet" copy machines made by 3M. They opened their second manufacturing facility for this production.

In 1974, the company adapted its precision etching and laminating expertise to the manufacture of flexible printed circuits. These first circuits served as interconnects in cardiac pacemakers. Temperature instruments (transmitters, meters, controllers, and alarms) were also added in the 1970s.

Recent products include optically-clear heaters, HDI and rigid-flex circuits, isolated temperature transmitters, and high temperature RTD elements.

Karl Schurr remained as company president until his death in 1999 at which time his son, Dana Schurr, assumed the role of president.

== Corporate business units ==
Minco's Thermofoil Heater Business Unit is the world's largest manufacturer of polyimide (Kapton) insulated etched foil heaters. They are generally used in applications where low weight, low profile and high energy efficiency, as well as precision conductive heat input are more critical than cost. One example of this would be Medical diagnostic equipment. They also sell transparent heaters, silicone rubber insulated heaters, high temperature mica insulated heaters and a unique thick film on aluminum heaters.

Minco's Flex Circuits Business Unit designs and manufactures custom flexible circuits for high-end applications for use in critical medical and defense products.

The Temperature Sensors & Instruments Business Unit manufactures custom temperature elements and assemblies for the rotating equipment industry (large generators, turbines and motors). It also sells customized temperature and relative humidity sensors, temperature transmitters and signal processing, transmitting, temperature monitoring, control and alarm services.
