= Donald Savelkoul =

American lawyer, politician, and businessman

Donald Charles Savelkoul (July 29, 1917 – May 24, 2004) was an American lawyer, politician, and businessman.

== Biography ==
Savelkoul was born in Minneapolis, Minnesota. He graduated from the University of Minnesota in 1939 and then worked in the United States Department of Labor, Wage and Hour Division until 1943. Savelkoul served in the United States Army Signal Corps from 1943 to 1946 and was stationed in the Pacific; he was commissioned a first lieutenant. In 1951, Savelkoul received his law degree from William Mitchell College of Law. Savelkoul lived in Fridley, Minnesota with his wife and family. He served as general counsel for the Minnesota AFL–CIO unit. Savelkoul served in the Minnesota House of Representatives in 1967 and 1968. Savelkoul died from cancer at his home in Fridley, Minnesota.
