= New Brighton, Minnesota =

City in Minnesota, United States

- City
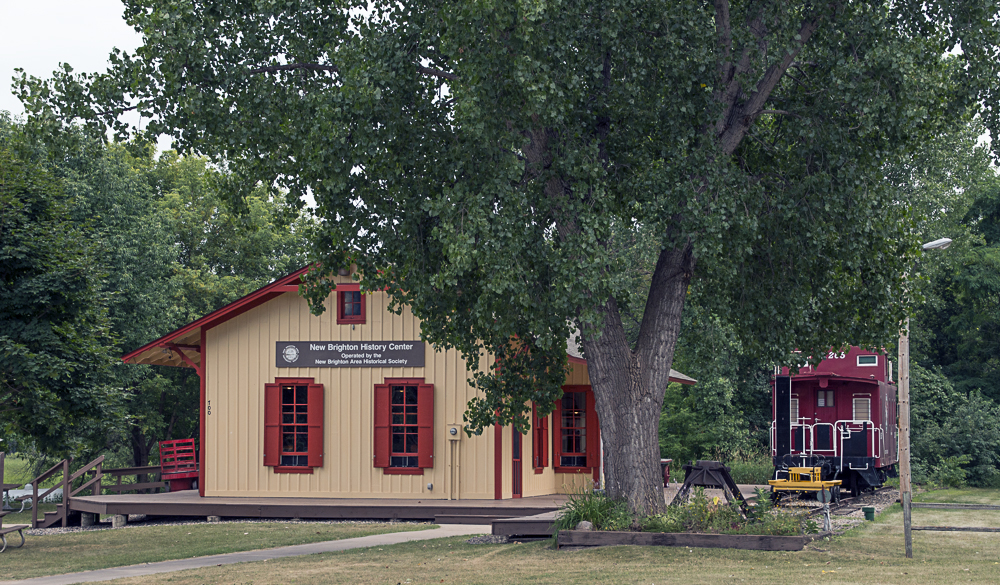
- New Brighton Area History Center

- Logo
- Motto: "building tomorrow today"
- Location of the city of New Brighton within Ramsey County, Minnesota
- Coordinates: 45°03′57″N 93°12′22″W
- Country: United States
- State: Minnesota
- County: Ramsey
- Incorporated: January 20, 1891

Government
  - Mayor: Kari Niedfeldt-Thomas

Area
  - Total: 7.08 sq mi (18.35 km^{2})
  - Land: 6.49 sq mi (16.82 km^{2})
  - Water: 0.59 sq mi (1.53 km^{2})
- Elevation: 866 ft (264 m)

Population (2020)
  - Total: 23,454
  - Estimate (2022): 22,413
  - Density: 3,611.3/sq mi (1,394.35/km^{2})
- Time zone: UTC-6 (Central (CST))
  - Summer (DST): UTC-5 (CDT)
- ZIP code: 55112
- Area code: 651
- FIPS code: 27-45430
- GNIS feature ID: 2395187
- Website: newbrightonmn.gov

New Brighton (/ˈbraɪtən/ BRY-tən) is a city in Ramsey County, Minnesota, United States. It is a suburb of the Twin Cities. The population was 23,454 at the 2020 census.

== History ==
In the mid 18th century, Mdewakanton Dakota tribes lived in the vicinity of New Brighton's marshy lakes, harvesting wild rice. The Dakota eventually settled a village near Long Lake at Rice Creek and a smaller encampment just east of Silver Lake Road on 3rd Street NW. Immigrants from Britain and France settled a small village in 1858 that included a general store, a school, and a mission church. As railroads were established in the area, millers in Minneapolis formed the Minneapolis Stockyards and Packing Company in 1888. The company supplied home, agriculture, and business needs. The venture included Minneapolis figures such as streetcar magnate Thomas Lowry, flour millers John Sargent Pillsbury, Senator William D. Washburn, ex-Minneapolis Mayor W.H. Eustis, and industrialist W.H. Dunwoody. As the village grew in prominence, it was incorporated on January 20, 1891. The city was given the name New Brighton after Brighton, Massachusetts. Each August, a city festival, Stockyard Days, celebrates this heritage at Long Lake Park.

As the streetcar system expanded in the early 20th century, immigrant and first-generation groups from Eastern Europe and Germany began moving outward from Northeast Minneapolis. New Brighton and St. Anthony residents also continue to celebrate this ethnic heritage with an annual Polka Dance Party which began in 1892.

In the 1920s, a local farmer said he heard a rumor that bootleggers had buried gold bars along Long Lake's eastern shore. The rumor spread and launched a mini "gold rush" along Long Lake to find the treasure.

== Geography ==
According to the United States Census Bureau, the city has an area of 7.06 square miles (18.29 km^{2}), of which 6.46 square miles (16.73 km^{2}) is land and 0.60 square miles (1.55 km^{2}) is water. Rice Creek flows through the northern part of the city.

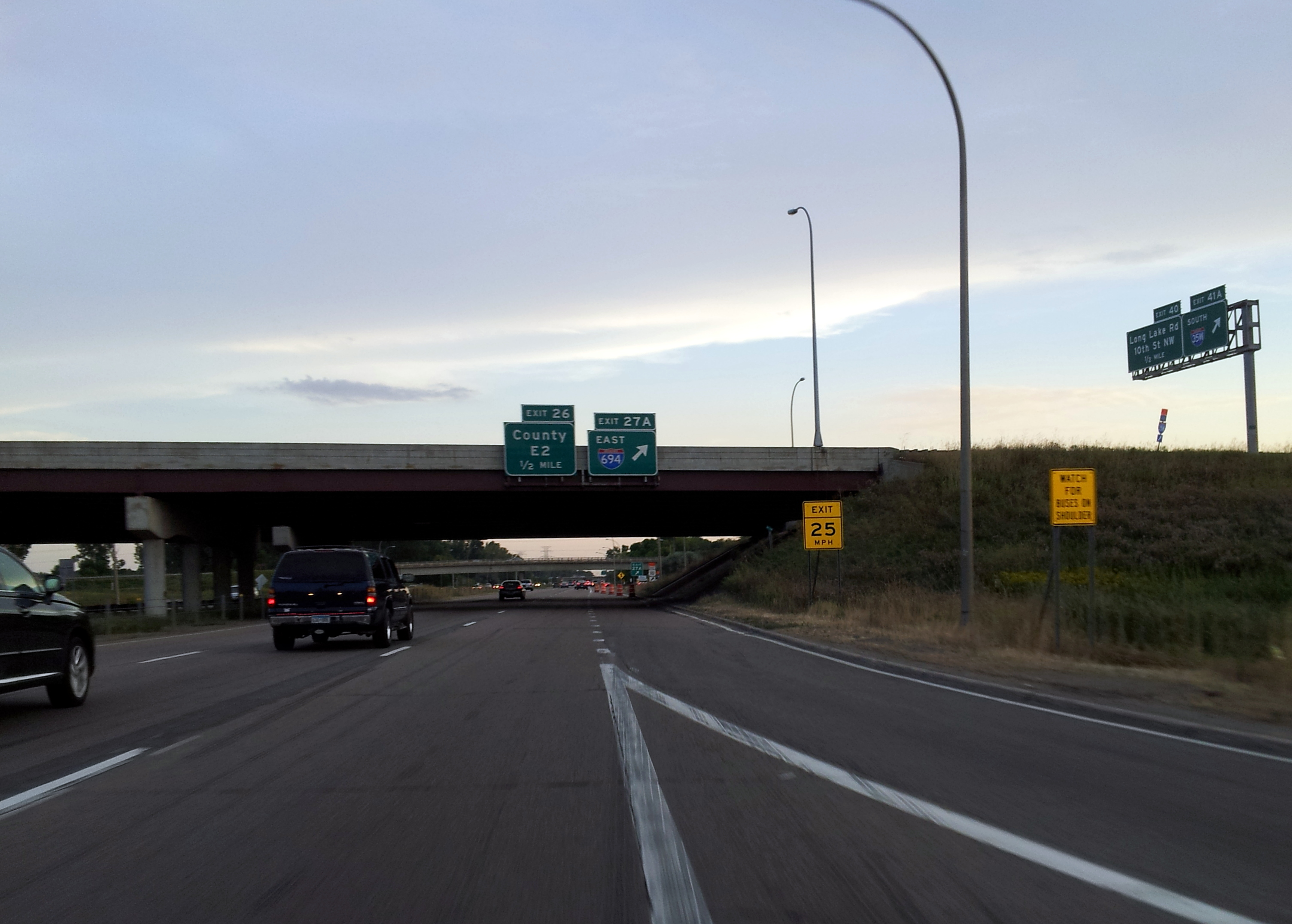
Interstate 35W

New Brighton is at the intersection of Interstate Highways 35W and 694. It is geographically incongruent. From north to south it is not even, and east to west it is even in only a few places. A piece of the city sits on the east side of Interstate 35W isolated from the rest of the city.

Nearby places include Arden Hills, Shoreview, Roseville, Saint Anthony Village, Columbia Heights, Fridley, Mounds View, and Minneapolis.

New Brighton is part of east–central Minnesota's glacial plain sandpile, which was flattened by glaciers during the most recent glacial advance. During the last glacial period, massive ice sheets at least 0.62 miles (1 km) thick ravaged the landscape of the town and sculpted its current terrain, which can be easily seen in Long Lake Regional Park. The Wisconsin glaciation left 12,000 years ago. These glaciers covered all of Minnesota except the far southeast, an area characterized by steep hills and streams that cut into the bedrock. Since New Brighton's landscape is still recovering from the weight of the glaciers and going through post-glacial rebound and the turmoil this created, the landscape is poorly drained, which has created the numerous lakes and rivers in the city. Long Lake itself is the remnants of the glaciers, as it was a chunk of ice that was left behind, melted, and created the lake in the hole it occupied.

== Demographics ==
Historical population
Census	Pop.	Note	%±
1890	355		—
1900	350		−1.4%
1910	375		7.1%
1920	368		−1.9%
1930	500		35.9%
1940	658		31.6%
1950	2,218		237.1%
1960	6,448		190.7%
1970	19,507		202.5%
1980	23,269		19.3%
1990	22,207		−4.6%
2000	22,206		0.0%
2010	21,456		−3.4%
2020	23,454		9.3%
2022 (est.)	22,413		−4.4%
U.S. Decennial Census; 2020 Census

=== 2020 census ===
As of the 2020 census, New Brighton had a population of 23,454. The median age was 38.3 years. 22.6% of residents were under the age of 18 and 18.9% of residents were 65 years of age or older. For every 100 females there were 94.3 males, and for every 100 females age 18 and over there were 91.7 males age 18 and over.

100.0% of residents lived in urban areas, while 0.0% lived in rural areas.

There were 9,548 households in New Brighton, of which 30.3% had children under the age of 18 living in them. Of all households, 47.9% were married-couple households, 18.2% were households with a male householder and no spouse or partner present, and 27.6% were households with a female householder and no spouse or partner present. About 28.8% of all households were made up of individuals and 12.7% had someone living alone who was 65 years of age or older.

There were 9,879 housing units, of which 3.4% were vacant. The homeowner vacancy rate was 0.5% and the rental vacancy rate was 3.6%.

Racial composition as of the 2020 census
Race	Number	Percent
White	16,356	69.7%
Black or African American	2,772	11.8%
American Indian and Alaska Native	109	0.5%
Asian	1,779	7.6%
Native Hawaiian and Other Pacific Islander	10	0.0%
Some other race	718	3.1%
Two or more races	1,710	7.3%
Hispanic or Latino (of any race)	1,448	6.2%

=== 2010 census ===
As of the census of 2010, there were 21,456 people, 8,915 households, and 5,731 families residing in the city. The population density was 3,321.4 inhabitants per square mile (1,282.4/km^{2}). There were 9,479 housing units at an average density of 1,467.3 per square mile (566.5/km^{2}). The racial makeup of the city was 84.2% White, 4.1% African American, 1.4% Native American, 4.8% Asian, 2.2% from other races, and 2.1% from two or more races. Hispanic or Latino of any race were 4.2% of the population.

There were 8,915 households, of which 28.4% had children under the age of 18 living with them, 49.3% were married couples living together, 10.8% had a female householder with no husband present, 4.2% had a male householder with no wife present, and 35.7% were non-families. 28.8% of all households were made up of individuals, and 10.8% had someone living alone who was 65 years of age or older. The average household size was 2.35 and the average family size was 2.89.

The median age in the city was 40.7 years. 21.1% of residents were under the age of 18; 9.4% were between the ages of 18 and 24; 24.5% were from 25 to 44; 27.2% were from 45 to 64; and 17.7% were 65 years of age or older. The gender makeup of the city was 48.3% male and 51.7% female.

=== 2000 census ===
As of the census of 2000, there were 22,206 people, 9,013 households, and 5,903 families residing in the city. The population density was 3,343.9 inhabitants per square mile (1,291.1/km^{2}). There were 9,121 housing units at an average density of 1,373.5 per square mile (530.3/km^{2}). The racial makeup of the city was 88.19% White, 3.02% African American, 2.62% Native American, 3.38% Asian, 0.06% Pacific Islander, 0.84% from other races, and 2.20% from two or more races. Hispanic or Latino of any race were 1.77% of the population.

There were 9,013 households, out of which 28.7% had children under the age of 18 living with them, 52.4% were married couples living together, 10.0% had a female householder with no husband present, and 34.5% were non-families. 26.1% of all households were made up of individuals, and 7.8% had someone living alone who was 65 years of age or older. The average household size was 2.40 and the average family size was 2.91.

In the city the population was spread out, with 22.2% under the age of 18, 11.3% from 18 to 24, 28.7% from 25 to 44, 25.6% from 45 to 64, and 12.6% who were 65 years of age or older. The median age was 37 years. For every 100 females there were 94.8 males. For every 100 females age 18 and over, there were 91.4 males.

The median income for a household in the city was $52,856, and the median income for a family was $68,724. Males had a median income of $45,291 versus $32,021 for females. The per capita income for the city was $27,574. About 3.3% of families and 4.7% of the population were below the poverty line, including 5.5% of those under age 18 and 3.9% of those age 65 or over.

== Economy ==
APi Group is located in New Brighton; it became a Fortune 500 company in 2026. In 2026, Andersen Corporation bought an office building in New Brighton for $9 million.

=== Twin Cities Ordinance Plant ===
In the 1940s, New Brighton housed the Twin Cities Ordinance Plant (TCOP) which manufactured .30 and .50 caliber ammunition during World War II. This factory employed 24,000 employees at the height of World War II-era weapons production, over half of whom were women. The plant was operated by the Federal Cartridge Corporation (FCC), which called itself the "employer of the greatest number of Negro workers" in Minnesota, and provided Black women with opportunities in machine operation, product inspection, plant security, and nursing.

Workers frequently operated in unsafe environments at the TCOP, causing injuries and forcing many to create mutual aid societies and establish businesses in order to support one another and themselves. The FCC publicly stated its opposition to racial discrimination in hiring, but limited its acceptance of new applicants in 1943, in light of factory race riots in other cities including Detroit. The company also initially hired Black women in jobs like custodial and cafeteria work, reflecting stereotypical ideas of their abilities as workers. The TCOP also organized the Negro Personnel Department around this time, in order to stress its non-discrimination policy. Many women employees formed strong social networks in the Women’s Army and Navy Department (WANDs) and other groups.

== Government ==
New Brighton has a council/manager form of government. The City Council meets the second and fourth Tuesdays of the month at New Brighton City Hall. Meetings are open to the public and are televised live on New Brighton's Government-access television (GATV) cable TV channel 16.

== Education ==
Four public schools are in New Brighton: Bel Air Elementary School, Sunnyside Elementary, Highview Middle School, and Irondale High School; additionally, until 2005, when it was converted into a community education center, there was a fifth public school in New Brighton: Pike Lake Kindergarten Center, now known as Pike Lake Education Center. All these schools are part of the Mounds View Public Schools (District 621).

Nearby private high schools attended by residents include Totino-Grace in Fridley, Minnehaha Academy in Minneapolis, and Breck School in Golden Valley. High school students in a portion of eastern New Brighton attend nearby Mounds View High School. A small fraction of New Brighton students attend Wilshire Park Elementary and Saint Anthony Village Middle and High Schools in nearby Saint Anthony Village, as part of New Brighton is served by ISD 282.
