= Abram M. Fridley =

American politician (1817–1888)

Abram McCormick Fridley
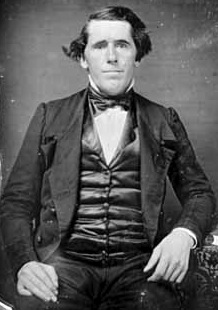

Member of the Minnesota House of Representatives from Minnesota

Personal details
- Born: May 1, 1817 Painted Post, New York, U.S.
- Died: March 26, 1888 (aged 70) Fridley Township, Minnesota, U.S.
- Resting place: Lakewood Cemetery
- Party: unknown
- Spouse: Betsey Ann
- Children: Fannie, Mary Jane, Henry C., Benjamin Franklin, David Horace
- Profession: Politician

Abram McCormick Fridley (1817 in Painted Post, New York – March 26, 1888 in Fridley, Minnesota) was a Minnesota politician and member of the Minnesota House of Representatives, and was the namesake of Fridley Township, Minnesota, which later became the city of Fridley, Minnesota.

Fridley was a Winnebago Indian agent, a lawyer, farmer, and merchant. He and his family were pioneers of the Fridley Township in Anoka County. Fridley was a land agent of the St. Paul and Pacific Railroad Company (SPPR) and its successor, the St. Paul, Minneapolis and Manitoba Railway Company. This railroad would build north from Minneapolis into Fridley Township.

== Early life ==
He was born in Painted Post, New York. Fridley read law and became a lawyer in Corning, New York. At age 21 he became a Deputy Sheriff of Steuben County, New York, and a Federal Government Customs Collector. In 1850, he was nominated by President Millard Fillmore on December 16, 1850, to the post of Winnebago Indian Agent. He came to Long Prairie, Minnesota in 1851.

== Minnesota Legislator ==
He served in the Territorial House 1855 (District 3); House 1869-71 (District 4); House 1879-80 (District 30).

== Death ==
He died on March 26, 1888, at his residence in Fridley, of "dropsy of the heart."

He was buried in Minneapolis in Lakewood Cemetery. His grave is marked with a large memorial.
