= List of nature centers in Minnesota =

This is a list of nature centers and environmental education centers in the state of Minnesota.

== Current nature centers ==
Name	Location	County	Region	Summary
Agassiz Environmental Learning Center	Fertile	Polk	Northwest	website, 640 acres with environmental learning center, wildlife preserve, and endangered sand dune ecosystem
Osprey Wilds Environmental Learning Center (formerly Audubon Center of the North Woods)	Sandstone	Pine	East Central	website, Two campuses (Main/Sandstone: 535-acres; Blacklock/Moose Lake: 562 acres) residential environmental learning center and day use nature center
Boulder Lake Environmental Learning Center	Duluth	St. Louis	Arrowhead	website, education and research about the Boulder Lake Management Area, over 18,000 acres
Camp Foley	Pine River	Cass	Central	website, includes Foley Environmental Education Center for school groups
Carpenter St. Croix Valley Nature Center	Hastings	Washington	Minneapolis–Saint Paul	website, 425-acre main property in MN, additional 300-acre Wisconsin nature preserve
Cascade Meadow Wetlands & Environmental Science Center	Rochester	Olmsted	Southeast	website, 90 acres, regional resource for environmental education with a focus on energy, water, and wetlands
Chik-Wauk Museum and Nature Center	Grand Marais	Cook	Arrowhead	website, area's cultural and natural history, 50 acres with trails, partnership of the Gunflint Trail Historical Society and Superior National Forest, Gunflint Ranger District, open seasonally
Coon Rapids Dam Visitor Center	Coon Rapids	Anoka	Minneapolis–Saint Paul	website, visitor center for Coon Rapids Dam Regional Park.
Deep Portage Learning Center	Hackensack	Cass	Central	website, residential environmental learning center
Dodge Nature Center	West Saint Paul	Dakota	Minneapolis–Saint Paul	website, 462 acres across four pieces of land, founded by Olivia Irvine Dodge
Eagle Bluff Environmental Learning Center	Lanesboro	Fillmore	Southeast	website, 80 acres, private residential environmental learning center
Eastman Nature Center at Elm Creek Park Reserve	Dayton	Hennepin	Minneapolis–Saint Paul	5,315 acres, operated by the Three Rivers Park District
Eden Prairie Outdoor Center	Eden Prairie	Hennepin	Minneapolis–Saint Paul	website, operated by the city for outdoor recreation and environmental education
Elk's Nature Center	Mankato	Blue Earth	South Central	website, operated by the City in 150-acre Rasmussen Woods
Harriet Alexander Nature Center	Roseville	Ramsey	Minneapolis–Saint Paul	website, operated by the City in 52-acre Roseville Park
Hartley Nature Center	Duluth	Saint Louis	Arrowhead	website, independent organization adjacent to 660-acre municipal Hartley Park
Hawk Ridge Bird Observatory	Duluth	Saint Louis	Arrowhead	website, 315-acre municipal nature reserve, major site for observation of raptor migration, fall education programs
Houston Nature Center	Houston	Houston	Southeast	website, located in Trailhead Park for the Root River Trail, operated by the City
International Owl Center	Houston	Houston	Southeast	website, Home to biological and cultural programs and displays, the World Owl Hall of Fame, the International Festival of Owls
International Wolf Center	Ely	Saint Louis	Arrowhead	Wolf conservation and education center, museum, resident wolves
Jay C. Hormel Nature Center	Austin	Mower	Southeast	500 acres, operated by the City
Laurentian Environmental Center	Britt	Saint Louis	Arrowhead	Located in Superior National Forest, public residential environmental educational facility, operated by Mounds View Public Schools
Long Lake Conservation Center	Palisade	Aitkin	East Central	website, 760 acres, operated by the county as a residential environmental education center, grounds open to the public
Lowry Nature Center at Carver Park Reserve	Victoria	Carver	Minneapolis–Saint Paul	3,719 acres, operated by the Three Rivers Park District
Maplewood Nature Center	Maplewood	Ramsey	Minneapolis–Saint Paul	website, 40 acres, operated by the City
Minnesota Valley National Wildlife Refuge	Bloomington	Hennepin	Minneapolis–Saint Paul	2,400-acre Long Meadow Lake Unit, Bloomington Education and Visitor Center
Minnesota Valley National Wildlife Refuge	Carver	Carver	Minneapolis–Saint Paul	1,480-acre Rapids Lakes Unit, Rapids Lake Education and Visitor Center
MSU Regional Science Center	Glyndon	Clay		website, program of Minnesota State University Moorhead, interpretive center and observatory, nature and environmental education programs, adjacent to the 1,068-acre Buffalo River State Park
National Eagle Center	Wabasha	Wabasha	Southeast	Conservation, research and educational efforts relating to eagles
Ney Nature Center	Henderson	Le Sueur	South Central	Facebook site, information, 446-acre environmental learning center and county park
North American Bear Center	Ely	Saint Louis	Arrowhead	website, museum with exhibits about bears, three bear ambassadors living in a 2.5 acre naturally forested enclosure with a pond and waterfalls
Oakdale Discovery Center	Oakdale	Washington	Minneapolis–Saint Paul	website, operated by the City in the 220-acre Oakdale Nature Preserve
Oxbow Park and Zollman Zoo	Byron	Olmsted	Southeast	620-acre county park with zoo featuring rehabilitated native wildlife, a nature center and campsites
Prairie Wetlands Learning Center at Fergus Falls Wetland Management District	Fergus Falls	Otter Tail	Central	Operated by the U.S. Fish and Wildlife Service, 4 miles of trails
Prairie Woods Environmental Learning Center	Spicer	Kandiyohi	Central	website, 500 acres, includes a Native American history village and a shooting sports range
Quarry Hill Nature Center	Rochester	Olmsted	Southeast	website, located in 320-acre Quarry Hill Park
The Raptor Center	St. Paul	Ramsey	Minneapolis–Saint Paul	website, raptor education and rehabilitation center, live raptor programs, operated by the College of Veterinary Medicine, University of Minnesota
Richardson Nature Center at Hyland Lake Park Reserve	Bloomington	Hennepin	Minneapolis–Saint Paul	Operated by the Three Rivers Park District
River Bend Nature Center	Faribault	Rice	South central	734 acres with 10 miles of trails
Saint John's Outdoor University	Collegeville	Stearns	Central	website, 2,830 acres, environmental education programs and events
Springbrook Nature Center	Fridley	Anoka	Minneapolis–Saint Paul	webpage, 127 acres, operated by the City
Sugarloaf Cove Interpretive Center	Schroeder	Cook	Arrowhead	website, operated by the North Shore Stewardship Association, education, preservation and restoration of North Shore of Lake Superior
Tamarack Nature Center	White Bear	Ramsey	Minneapolis–Saint Paul	website, operated by the county, 320-acre preserve within Bald Eagle-Otter Lakes Regional Park
Vince Shute Wildlife Sanctuary	Between Orr and Nett Lake	St. Louis	Arrowhead	Website Operated by American Bear Association
Voyageur Environmental Center	Mound	Hennepin	Minneapolis–Saint Paul	website, 110 acres, year-round environmental education center, operated by the Boys & Girls Clubs of the Twin Cities
Wargo Nature Center	Lino Lakes	Anoka	Minneapolis–Saint Paul	website, outdoor learning center operated by the county, part of the 5,000-acre Rice Creek Chain of Lakes Regional Park Reserve
Westwood Hills Nature Center	St. Louis Park	Hennepin	Minneapolis–Saint Paul	website, 160 acres, operated by the City
Wildlife Science Center	Stacy	Chisago	Minneapolis–Saint Paul	website, wolf research and education center, weekend public tours
Wolf Ridge Environmental Learning Center	Finland	Lake	Arrowhead	2000-acre K-12 school and residential learning center
Wood Lake Nature Center	Richfield	Hennepin	Minneapolis–Saint Paul	150 acres, operated by the City

== Former nature centers ==
- Agassiz Audubon Society Center, Warren
- Maltby Nature Preserve Science Center, Randolph, Goodhue County, filed Chapter 11 bankruptcy on May 12, 2009, due to a decrease in donations
- Lee and Warner Rose Nature Center, Marine on St. Croix

== Resources ==
- Minnesota Association for Environmental Education
