= Mark Landsberger =

American basketball player

Personal information
- Born: May 21, 1955 (age 71) Minot, North Dakota, U.S.
- Listed height: 6 ft 8 in (2.03 m)
- Listed weight: 215 lb (98 kg)

Career information
- High school: Mounds View (Arden Hills, Minnesota)
- College: Allan Hancock College (1973–1974); Minnesota (1974–1975); Arizona State (1976–1977)
- NBA draft: 1977: 2nd round, 35th overall pick
- Drafted by: Chicago Bulls
- Playing career: 1977–1993
- Position: Power forward / center
- Number: 54

Career history
- 1977–1980: Chicago Bulls
- 1980–1983: Los Angeles Lakers
- 1983–1984: Atlanta Hawks
- 1987–1989: Panionios
- 1989–1991: Montecatini Sporting Club
- 1991–1992: CB Collado Villalba
- 1992–1993: Gimnasia y Esgrima (CR)

Career highlights
- 2× NBA champion (1980, 1982); First-team All-WAC (1977)

Career NBA statistics
- Points: 2,468 (5.6 ppg)
- Rebounds: 2,681 (6.1 rpg)
- Assists: 236 (0.5 apg)
- Stats at NBA.com
- Stats at Basketball Reference

Mark Walter Landsberger (born May 21, 1955) is an American former professional basketball player. At 6'8" and 215 pounds, he played power forward and center for the Los Angeles Lakers from 1980 to 1983.

== Career ==
Landsberger attended Mounds View High School, in Arden Hills, Minnesota, where he graduated in 1973 after leading the Mustangs to the 1972 AA State Championship as a junior. In his senior campaign, he averaged 26.1 points per game, and led the Mustangs back to the state tournament and the consolation championship. Over his high school varsity career, he scored 1,290 points and grabbed 910 rebounds.

Landsberger then attended Allan Hancock College, where he was the California junior college player of the year, the University of Minnesota, and Arizona State University.

At ASU, he set school records for most rebounds in a game (27) and highest rebounds-per game average in a season (14.4) for the Sun Devils.

After college, he was selected by the Chicago Bulls in the second round of the 1977 NBA draft. He appeared in 196 games for the Bulls from 1977 to 1980, averaging 7.4 points per game and 7.6 rebounds per game. On January 28, 1979, Landsberger grabbed 29 rebounds in a game against the Denver Nuggets. At the time, this was the third-highest single-game rebounding total in Chicago Bulls history. That season, Landsberger ranked seventh in the league in total offensive rebounds, with 292.

On February 13, 1980, the Bulls traded Landsberger to the Los Angeles Lakers in exchange for Oliver Mack and two second round draft choices. Landsberger remained in Los Angeles until 1983. Playing behind future hall-of-famers like Kareem Abdul-Jabbar, James Worthy, and Magic Johnson, he averaged 4.7 points per game and 5.2 rebounds per game with the Lakers. He won NBA Championship rings as a reserve in 1980 and 1982.

Landsberger started the 1983-84 NBA season with the Lakers but was waived later that year before being given any playing time. He signed with the Atlanta Hawks on December 29, 1983, where he averaged 1.5 points and 3.4 rebounds in 35 games to finish the season. This was his last season in the NBA, and he ended his NBA career with 2,468 total points and 2,681 total rebounds.

He played professionally in Europe until the 1990s. Among the highlights of his European career was a 34 rebound game while playing for Lotus Montecatini Terme in Lucca, Italy on November 11, 1990. That performance set a record for most rebounds in an Italian league game. Landsberger also set Greek league records for most rebounds in a game (31) and highest rebounds per game average for a season (17.9).

On June 21, 2021, it was announced by Deadline that Landsberger would be portrayed by actor Austin Aaron in the upcoming HBO series Winning Time. The series premiered in March 2022.

== Career statistics ==
Legend
GP	Games played	GS	Games started	MPG	Minutes per game
FG%	Field goal percentage	3P%	3-point field goal percentage	FT%	Free throw percentage
RPG	Rebounds per game	APG	Assists per game	SPG	Steals per game
BPG	Blocks per game	PPG	Points per game	**Bold**	Career high
†	Won an NBA championship

=== NBA ===
==== Regular season ====
Year	Team	GP	GS	MPG	FG%	3P%	FT%	RPG	APG	SPG	BPG	PPG
1977–78	Chicago	62		14.9	.506		**.580**	4.9	.7	.3	.1	5.6
1978–79	Chicago	**80**		**24.5**	.475		.469	**9.3**	**.9**	.3	**.3**	8.1
1979–80	Chicago	54		21.0	**.529**	–	.524	8.3	.6	**.4**	**.3**	**8.4**
1979–80†	L.A. Lakers	23		16.3	.482		.518	7.1	.6	**.4**	.2	7.0
1980–81	L.A. Lakers	69		15.7	.502	.000	.534	5.5	.4	.3	.1	5.7
1981–82†	L.A. Lakers	75	1	15.1	.438	.000	.508	5.3	.4	.1	.1	4.3
1982–83	L.A. Lakers	39	**4**	9.1	.422	–	.480	3.3	.3	.2	.1	2.5
1983–84	Atlanta	35	0	9.6	.373	–	.577	3.4	.3	.2	.1	1.5
Career		437	5	16.7	.481	.000	.522	6.1	.5	.3	.2	5.6

==== Playoffs ====
Year	Team	GP	MPG	FG%	3P%	FT%	RPG	APG	SPG	BPG	PPG
1980†	L.A. Lakers	**16**	12.2	.362	.000	.833	4.3	.1	.2	.1	**3.4**
1981	L.A. Lakers	3	10.7	.286	–	**1.000**	**5.0**	.0	**.3**	.0	1.7
1982†	L.A. Lakers	9	6.7	.333	–	.444	2.4	.2	.0	.0	1.1
1983	L.A. Lakers	11	**12.8**	**.429**	.000	.500	4.0	**.3**	.0	**.2**	2.4
1984	Atlanta	2	2.5	.000	–	–	.5	.0	.0	.0	.0
Career		41	10.6	.368	.000	.600	3.7	.2	.1	.1	2.3
