= 2017–18 Australian Baseball League season =

- League: Australian Baseball League
- Sport: Baseball
- Duration: 16 November 2017 – 11 February 2018
- Games: 119
- Teams: 6
- Total attendance: 98,397

Regular season
- Season MVP: Jake Fraley

Championship Series
- Venue: Melbourne Ballpark
- Champions: Brisbane Bandits (3rd title)
- Runners-up: Canberra Cavalry

Seasons
- ← 2016–17 2018–19 →

The 2017–18 Australian Baseball League season was the eighth Australian Baseball League (ABL) season, and was held from 16 November 2017 to 11 February 2018. It was the last season of the ABL that was played with 6 teams, as the league expanded to eight teams for the 2018–19 season.

The league also saw a large spike in offensive production with the single season home-run, run, AVG, SLG & OPS records all broken and home runs doubled, leading to a juiced ball theory.

== Teams ==
Teams in the ABL
Team	State / Territory	Stadium
Adelaide Bite	South Australia	Diamond Sports Stadium
Brisbane Bandits	Queensland	Holloway Field
Canberra Cavalry	Australian Capital Territory	Narrabundah Ballpark
Melbourne Aces	Victoria	Melbourne Ballpark
Perth Heat	Western Australia	Baseball Park
Sydney Blue Sox	New South Wales	Blue Sox Stadium

== Regular season ==
Key
Clinched postseason berth

2017–18 regular season standings
Pos	Team	W	L	Pct.	GB	Home	Away
1	Brisbane Bandits	28	11	.718	–	15–4	13–7
2	Perth Heat	26	14	.650	2.5	12–8	14–6
3	Canberra Cavalry	21	18	.538	4.0	14–6	10–9
4	Melbourne Aces	17	23	.425	11.5	9–11	8–12
5	Sydney Blue Sox	13	27	.325	15.5	7–13	6–14
6	Adelaide Bite	11	29	.275	17.5	7–13	4–16

== Postseason ==
Semifinal Series
1	Brisbane Bandits	1
4	Melbourne Aces	0
2	Perth Heat	1
3	Canberra Cavalry	2

Championship Series
1	Brisbane Bandits	2
3	Canberra Cavalry	1

=== Statistical leaders ===
Batting leaders
Stat	Player (Note: Minimum 2.7 PAs per team game.)	Team	Total
AVG	Jay Baum	Canberra Cavalry	.439
HR	T.J. Bennett Donald Lutz	Brisbane Bandits Brisbane Bandits	16
RBI	David Kandilas Chiang Chih-hsien	Canberra Cavalry Sydney Blue Sox	44
R	Jake Fraley	Perth Heat	50
H	Jay Baum Jake Fraley	Canberra Cavalry Perth Heat	61
SB	Jake Fraley	Perth Heat	39

Pitching leaders
Stat	Player (Note: Minimum 0.8 IP per team game.)	Team	Total
W	6 tied at	4 teams	5
L	Mark Hamburger Greg Mosel	Melbourne Aces Adelaide Bite	7
ERA	Frank Gailey	Canberra Cavalry	2.34
K	Ryan Bollinger Josh Tols	Brisbane Bandits Melbourne Aces	75
IP	Mark Hamburger	Melbourne Aces	67 1/3
SV	Cameron Lamb	Perth Heat	6

=== Championship Series ===
09 February 2018; 18:00 (UTC+11:00); Game 1	Canberra Cavalry	5–1	Brisbane Bandits	(Australian Capital Territory) Narrabundah Ballpark, Canberra; Attendance: 2,275; Umpires: HP: Takahito Matsuda 1B: Trent Thomas 2B: Matthew Pearson 3B: Ben Nash
09 February 2018; 18:00 (UTC+11:00); Game 1	WP: Brian Grening (1–0); Sv: Tyler Herr (1)	Boxscore	LP: Ryan Bollinger (0–1)	(Australian Capital Territory) Narrabundah Ballpark, Canberra; Attendance: 2,275; Umpires: HP: Takahito Matsuda 1B: Trent Thomas 2B: Matthew Pearson 3B: Ben Nash
09 February 2018; 18:00 (UTC+11:00); Game 1	HR: David Kandilas (1), Robbie Perkins (1)	Boxscore	HR: TJ Bennett (1)	(Australian Capital Territory) Narrabundah Ballpark, Canberra; Attendance: 2,275; Umpires: HP: Takahito Matsuda 1B: Trent Thomas 2B: Matthew Pearson 3B: Ben Nash

10 February 2018; 18:00 (UTC+10:00); Game 2	Brisbane Bandits	12–2	Canberra Cavalry	(Victoria (state)) Holloway Field, Brisbane; Attendance: 2,202; Umpires: HP: Tom West 1B: Mal Mackay 2B: Paul Latta 3B: Takahito Matsuda
10 February 2018; 18:00 (UTC+10:00); Game 2	WP: Tim Atherton (1–0)	Boxscore	LP: Lake Bachar (0–1)	(Victoria (state)) Holloway Field, Brisbane; Attendance: 2,202; Umpires: HP: Tom West 1B: Mal Mackay 2B: Paul Latta 3B: Takahito Matsuda
10 February 2018; 18:00 (UTC+10:00); Game 2	HR: 2 Chih-Sheng Lin (2), Mitch Nilsson (1), 2 Andrew Campbell (2), David Sutherland (1), Donald Lutz (1)	Boxscore	HR: Travis Witherspoon (1)	(Victoria (state)) Holloway Field, Brisbane; Attendance: 2,202; Umpires: HP: Tom West 1B: Mal Mackay 2B: Paul Latta 3B: Takahito Matsuda

11 February 2018; 16:00 (UTC+10:00); Game 3	Brisbane Bandits	4–2	Canberra Cavalry	(Victoria (state)) Holloway Field, Brisbane; Attendance: 1,333; Umpires: HP: Mal Mackay 1B: Paul Latta 2B: Takahito Matsuda 3B: Tom West
11 February 2018; 16:00 (UTC+10:00); Game 3	WP: Travis Blackley (1–0); Sv: Ryan Searle (1)	Boxscore	LP: Frank Gailey (0–1)	(Victoria (state)) Holloway Field, Brisbane; Attendance: 1,333; Umpires: HP: Mal Mackay 1B: Paul Latta 2B: Takahito Matsuda 3B: Tom West
11 February 2018; 16:00 (UTC+10:00); Game 3	HR: Mitch Nilsson (2), Adam Weisenberger (1)	Boxscore		(Victoria (state)) Holloway Field, Brisbane; Attendance: 1,333; Umpires: HP: Mal Mackay 1B: Paul Latta 2B: Takahito Matsuda 3B: Tom West
