= 2015–16 Australian Baseball League season =

- League: Australian Baseball League
- Sport: Baseball
- Duration: 23 October 2015 – 6 February 2016
- Games: 159
- Teams: 6
- Total attendance: 150,213

Regular season
- Season MVP: Justin Williams

Championship Series
- Venue: Holloway Field
- Champions: Brisbane Bandits (1st title)
- Runners-up: Adelaide Bite

Seasons
- ← 2014–15 2016–17 →

The 2015–16 Australian Baseball League season was the sixth Australian Baseball League (ABL) season, held from 23 October 2015 to 6 February 2016.

== Teams ==

Teams in the ABL
Team	City	State	Stadium	Ref
Adelaide Bite	Adelaide	South Australia	Norwood Oval	
Brisbane Bandits	Brisbane	Queensland	Brisbane Exhibition Ground	
Canberra Cavalry	Canberra	Australian Capital Territory	Narrabundah Ballpark	
Melbourne Aces	Melbourne	Victoria	Melbourne Ballpark	
Perth Heat	Perth	Western Australia	Baseball Park	
Sydney Blue Sox	Sydney	New South Wales	Blue Sox Stadium	

== Regular season ==
=== Standings ===
Team	Pld	W	L	GB	PCT	Home	Away	Qualification
Brisbane Bandits	56	37	19	—	.661	23–5	14–14	Championship Series
Canberra Cavalry	56	31	25	6	.554	18–10	13–15	Preliminary final
Adelaide Bite	56	30	26	7	.536	18–10	12–16	Preliminary final
Sydney Blue Sox	55	26	29	10.5	.473	18–9	8–20	
Perth Heat	56	23	33	14	.411	12–16	11–17	
Melbourne Aces	55	20	35	16.5	.364	10–18	10–17	

=== Statistical leaders ===
Batting leaders
Stat	Player (Note: Minimum 2.7 PAs per team game.)	Team	Total
AVG	David Harris	Canberra Cavalry	.346
HR	Kyle Petty	Adelaide Bite	14
RBI	Kyle Petty Jason Leblebijian	Adelaide Bite Canberra Cavalry	44
R	Riley Unroe	Brisbane Bandits	42
H	Riley Unroe	Brisbane Bandits	67
SB	Riley Unroe	Brisbane Bandits	14

Pitching leaders
Stat	Player (Note: Minimum 0.8 IP per team game.)	Team	Total
W	Steven Chambers Jason Jarvis	Adelaide Bite Brisbane Bandits	8
L	Wayne Lundgren Daniel Schmidt	Sydney Blue Sox Perth Heat	7
ERA	Ryan Searle	Brisbane Bandits	0.40
K	Edwin Carl	Perth Heat	85
IP	Matt Larkins	Melbourne Aces	97
SV	Ryan Searle	Brisbane Bandits	17

== Postseason ==
=== Bracket ===
Preliminary Final Series			Championship Series
			1	Brisbane Bandits	2
2	Canberra Cavalry	1	3	Adelaide Bite	0
3	Adelaide Bite	2

=== Preliminary Final Series ===
==== Game 1 ====
January 29, 2016 19:00 (UTC+10:30) at Norwood Oval
Team	1	2	3	4	5	6	7	8	9	R	H	E
Canberra Cavalry	0	2	0	0	1	0	1	0	0	4	5	0
Adelaide Bite	0	2	2	0	0	1	0	1	X	6	11	0
WP: Josh Tols (1–0) LP: Brian Grening (0–1) Sv: Loek van Mil (1); Home runs: CAN: Ryan Miller (1); ADE: Travis Demeritte 2 (2); Boxscore

==== Game 2 ====
The second game of the series was scheduled to be played on 30 January, but was postponed due to wet weather. It was rescheduled to be the first game of a doubleheader the following day.

January 31, 2016 12:00 (UTC+11:00) at Narrabundah Ballpark
Team	1	2	3	4	5	6	7	8	9	R	H	E
Adelaide Bite	2	0	0	0	0	0	0	0	0	2	11	0
Canberra Cavalry	0	0	0	0	2	1	0	0	X	3	7	0
WP: Steven Kent (1–0) LP: Takuro Ito (0–1) Sv: Michael Click (1); Home runs: ADE: Kyle Petty (1); CAN: Bryan Pounds (1); Boxscore

==== Game 3 ====
January 31, 2016 15:30 (UTC+11:00) at Narrabundah Ballpark
Team	1	2	3	4	5	6	7	8	9	R	H	E
Adelaide Bite	1	0	4	1	0	0	2	0	1	9	12	1
Canberra Cavalry	1	1	0	0	0	0	0	0	0	2	12	1
WP: Nick Talbot (1–0) LP: Scott Cone (0–1); Home runs: ADE: Travis Demeritte 2 (4), Kyle Petty (2); CAN: None; Boxscore

==== Composite Line Score ====
2016 ABL Preliminary Final Series (2–1): Adelaide Bite over Canberra Cavalry

Team	1	2	3	4	5	6	7	8	9	R	H	E
Adelaide Bite	3	2	6	1	0	1	2	1	1	17	34	1
Canberra Cavalry	1	3	0	0	3	1	1	0	0	9	24	1

=== Championship Series ===
==== Game 1 ====
February 5, 2016 18:00 (UTC+10:00) at AFA Sdadium at Holloway Field
Team	1	2	3	4	5	6	7	8	9	R	H	E
Adelaide Bite	0	0	1	0	3	0	0	0	0	4	10	1
Brisbane Bandits	1	0	4	0	0	1	0	1	X	7	10	0
WP: Jason Jarvis (1–0) LP: Josh Tols (0–1) Sv: Ryan Searle (1); Home runs: ADE: Angus Roeger (1); BRI: Bralin Jackson (1), TJ Bennett (1); Boxscore

==== Game 2 ====
February 6, 2016 18:00 (UTC+10:00) at AFA Sdadium at Holloway Field
Team	1	2	3	4	5	6	7	8	9	R	H	E
Adelaide Bite	0	0	0	0	0	1	0	0	0	1	6	3
Brisbane Bandits	0	0	3	1	1	2	0	0	X	7	8	2
WP: Travis Blackley (1–0) LP: Steven Chambers (0–1); Home runs: ADE: Kyle Petty (1); BRI: Donald Lutz (1); Boxscore

==== Composite Line Score ====
2016 ABL Championship Series (2–0): Brisbane Bandits over Adelaide Bite

Team	1	2	3	4	5	6	7	8	9	R	H	E
Brisbane Bandits	1	0	7	1	1	3	0	1	0	14	18	2
Adelaide Bite	0	0	1	0	3	1	0	0	0	5	16	4
