= Donald Lutz =

American baseball player (born 1989)

- First baseman / Outfielder
- Born: February 6, 1989 (age 37); Watertown, New York, U.S.
- Batted: Left Threw: Right

MLB debut
- April 29, 2013, for the Cincinnati Reds

Last MLB appearance
- September 24, 2014, for the Cincinnati Reds

MLB statistics
- Batting average: .211
- Home runs: 1
- Runs batted in: 9
- Stats at Baseball Reference

Teams
- Cincinnati Reds (2013–2014)

Donald Thomas Lutz III (born February 6, 1989) is an American-German former professional baseball first baseman / leftfielder. He played in Major League Baseball (MLB) for the Cincinnati Reds.

Lutz signed with the Reds as a non-drafted amateur free agent in 2007. Despite starting his baseball career in his teenage years, and in Germany, Lutz first visited Cincinnati's spring training camp, reached Double–A and was placed on the Reds' 40-man roster in 2012.

Lutz was the first German-developed player to play in the modern Major Leagues. He played for Team Germany in the 2019 European Baseball Championship, in which they came in 6th.

== Playing career ==
Lutz was a baby when his family moved to Germany. He had his first experience with the sport at 14, when his older brother (Sascha Lutz, who became a baseball player in the German leagues) took him to a training session of the Friedberg Braves, a team located in Friedberg (Hessen). Since then, Lutz increased his skills, especially his hitting. After two years with the local team, he went to the Bad Homburg Hornets and played there for two seasons before he went to a baseball boarding school in Regensburg for one more season.

=== Cincinnati Reds ===
Within another few years, he became a member of the Germany national baseball team and traveled to Europe-wide training camps, which finally led to his signing with the Cincinnati Reds on July 15, 2007.

Lutz played his first two seasons for the former Gulf Coast League affiliate of the Reds. In those seasons he played 50 games and achieved a .250 BA with one home run and 19 RBI in the first season, while only scoring a .169 BA, 10 RBI and no home runs the following year. In his third season, Lutz remained at the Rookie level but was transferred to the Billings Mustangs from the Pioneer League, where he had a .286 BA as well as 7 home runs and 28 RBI.

After an impressive 2011 season for the single-A Dayton Dragons with a .301 BA and 20 home runs and the team's first cycle, Lutz was promoted to the Reds' 40-man roster in 2012 and participated in 15 Spring training games. A few days before Opening Day, he was dropped from the active roster and sent to the High–A Bakersfield Blaze. Through mid-July, Lutz made 63 appearances and logged 17 home runs and 51 RBI. After being promoted to Double–A Pensacola Blue Wahoos Lutz continued with nearly the same statistics. After playing in the Arizona Fall League and a second spring training with the Reds, Lutz started the 2013 season in Pensacola but remained on the 40-man roster.

The Reds promoted Lutz to the major leagues for the first time on April 29, 2013. On May 5, against Shawn Camp of the Chicago Cubs, Lutz got his first MLB hit when he lined a ball into center field. Lutz went on to score that inning and registered an RBI and a stolen base later in the same game. Lutz hit his first career home run on May 12, a three-run homer off Brewers pitcher Wily Peralta. He was sent back down to Pensacola on June 25. In 34 games during his rookie campaign, Lutz batted .241/.254/.310 with one home run, eight RBI, and two stolen bases.

On April 21, 2014, he hit for the first cycle in Blue Wahoos franchise history in a 17–1 win against the Jacksonville Suns. In 28 games for the Reds in 2014, Lutz hit .176/.222/.255 with one RBI.

On May 1, 2015, it was announced Lutz would undergo Tommy John surgery and would be out for the season. He was released on June 3. On January 12, 2016, Lutz re-signed with the Reds organization on a minor league contract. He played in 66 games split between Pensacola and the Triple-A Louisville Bats, hitting a combined .199/.252/.261 with two home runs and 18 RBI. Lutz elected free agency following the season on November 7.

=== Bravos de León ===
On March 30, 2017, Lutz signed with the Bravos de León of the Mexican League. In 10 games with León, he batted .290/.378/.316 with five RBI and two stolen bases. Lutz was released by the Bravos on April 12.

On May 4, 2017, Lutz signed with the Kansas City T-Bones of the American Association of Independent Professional Baseball. He was released without making an appearance for the team on May 17.

=== Brisbane Bandits ===
Lutz commenced his comeback from injury with the Brisbane Bandits in the ABL for the 2015-16 season, where his 3/7 in the 2016 Australian Baseball League postseason led to him being named Championship Series MVP and helping the Bandits to their first league championship.

The following season, he played in a more limited capacity trying to break back into affiliated baseball from injuries, but still hit .323/.405/.600 across 19 games through the middle of the 2016-17 season.

Lutz rejoined the Bandits full-time for the 2017-18 Australian Baseball League season where he broke the single season homerun record with teammate T. J. Bennett with 16. The Bandits went on to win their third consecutive ABL title.

Following the conclusion of the 2017–18 season, he announced his retirement as a player, and later signed on as the new hitting coach of the Arizona League Reds for the 2018 season.

On September 6, 2018, Lutz came out of retirement to play again for Brisbane in the 2018-19 Australian Baseball League season. He had a relatively lean season, slashing .186/.312/.310, but was key in Brisbane's postseason run, going 4/10 with three home runs to help the Bandits to their fourth successive championship.

== Coaching career ==
As of 2019, Lutz was the hitting coach for the Arizona League Reds.

Lutz is now the hitting coach for the Brisbane Bandits.
