= Aaron Whitefield =

Australian baseball player (born 1996)

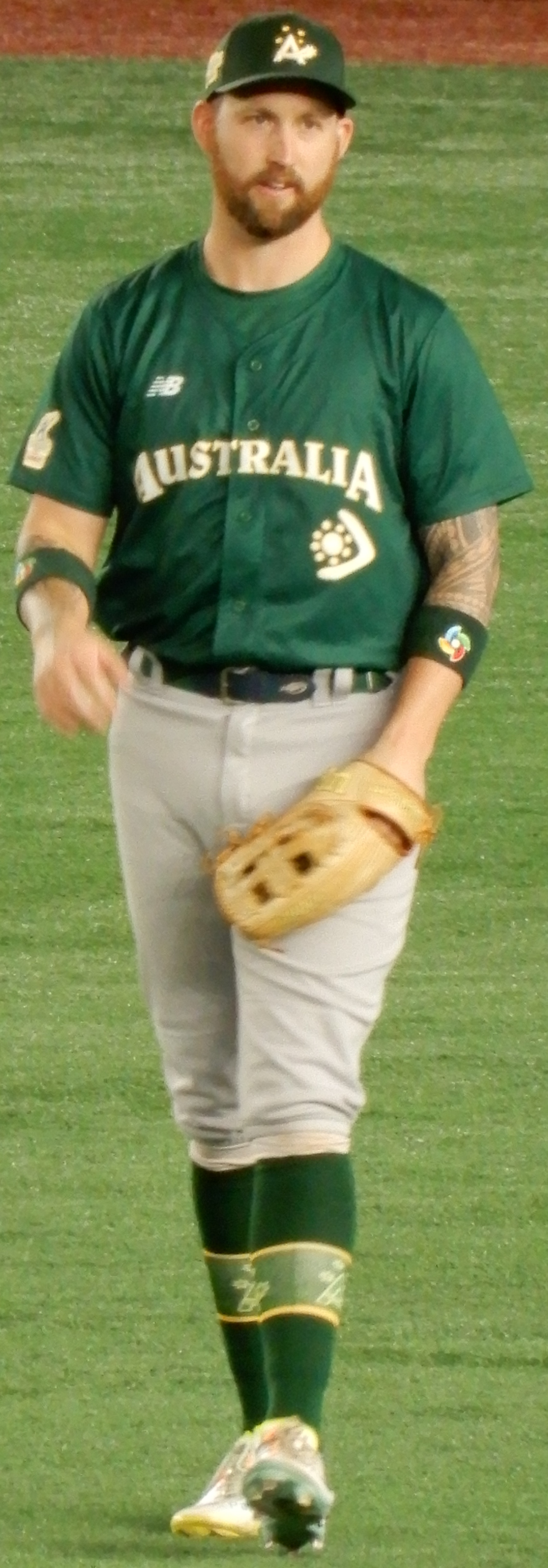
- Whitefield with the Australia national baseball team in 2023
- Centerfielder
- Born: 2 September 1996 (age 30); Brisbane, Queensland
- Batted: Right Threw: Right

MLB debut
- July 25, 2020, for the Minnesota Twins

Last MLB appearance
- May 14, 2022, for the Los Angeles Angels

MLB statistics
- Batting average: .000
- Home runs: 0
- Runs batted in: 0
- Hits: 0
- Stolen Bases: 0
- Stats at Baseball Reference

Teams
- Minnesota Twins (2020); Los Angeles Angels (2022)

Aaron James Whitefield (born 2 September 1996) is an Australian former professional baseball outfielder. He played in Major League Baseball (MLB) for the Minnesota Twins and Los Angeles Angels.

== Career ==
Whitefield began his career playing fastpitch softball. Whitefield won the bronze medal at the 2012 U-18 Men's Softball World Cup as a member of Australia's national softball team.

=== Minnesota Twins ===
After signing with the Minnesota Twins of Major League Baseball in 2015, Whitefield was assigned to the Gulf Coast Twins of the Rookie-level Gulf Coast League. He played in only seven games for the Twins due to visa issues. After the season, he played for the Brisbane Bandits of the Australian Baseball League (ABL) for 2015–16 ABL season. In 2016, Whitefield returned to the Gulf Coast League and played in 51 games, posting a .298 batting average with two home runs, 17 RBIs and 31 stolen bases. After the season, he played for the Brisbane Bandits of the ABL for 2016–17 ABL season and winning three consecutive championships with the club and the league MVP award.

In 2017, Whitefield played for the Cedar Rapids Kernels of the Single–A Midwest League, where he batted .262 with 11 home runs, 57 RBIs, and 33 stolen bases. After the season, he played for the Brisbane Bandits of the ABL for 2017–18 ABL season. Whitfield spent the 2018 season with the Fort Myers Miracle of the High–A Florida State League. He hit .211 with two home runs, 25 stolen bases, and ten RBIs in 65 games. After the season, he joined to the Adelaide Bite of the ABL for the 2018–19 ABL season.

After the 2019 season, he joined to the Adelaide Bite of the ABL for the 2019–20 ABL season. On 29 June, Whitefield made the Twins 60-man summer camp roster for the 2020 season, ending up on the Opening Day roster. On 25 July, he made his MLB debut in the ninth inning against the Chicago White Sox as a pinch runner for Eddie Rosario. On 10 August, Whitefield was outrighted off of the 40-man roster. Whitefield spent the 2021 season with Double-A Wichita Wind Surge, slashing .257/.327/.353 with 6 home runs and 58 RBI in 111 games. On 7 November 2021, he elected free agency.

=== Los Angeles Angels ===
On 10 November 2021, Whitefield signed a minor league contract with the Los Angeles Angels organization. On 8 May 2022, he was promoted to the Angels' main roster after playing for the Double-A Rocket City Trash Pandas of the Southern League, where he batted .301 with 5 home runs, 17 RBIs, and 13 stolen bases. Whitefield was designated for assignment on 14 May 2022. He cleared waivers 4 days later, and was outrighted to Double-A Rocket City Trash Pandas. On 14 October, Whitefield re–signed with the Angels organization on a minor league contract.

Whitefield began the 2023 season back with Double–A Rocket City. In 37 games, he hit just .191/.280/.324 with 3 home runs, 13 RBI, and 12 stolen bases. On 19 June 2023, Whitefield was released by the Angels organization.

=== Kansas City Monarchs ===
On 27 June 2023, Whitefield signed with the Kansas City Monarchs of the American Association of Professional Baseball. In 29 games, he batted .234/.317/.262 with no home runs, 5 RBI, and 11 stolen bases.

=== Sioux Falls Canaries ===
On 20 August 2023, Whitefield was traded to the Sioux Falls Canaries in exchange for cash and future considerations. In 12 appearances for Sioux Falls, he hit .250/.346/.455 with two home runs, nine RBI, and seven stolen bases.

On 19 January 2024, Whitefield re-signed with the Canaries. He did not appear in a game during the 2024 season. He became a free agent following the season.

== International career ==
Whitefield has played for the Australian national baseball team in the 2017 World Baseball Classic Qualification in 2016, 2017 World Baseball Classic 2019 WBSC Premier12, 2023 World Baseball Classic, and 2026 World Baseball Classic.

== Personal life ==
Whitefield's father, John, played fastpitch softball for New Zealand's national team, and his mother, Nicole Molander, played softball in Queensland and for the Australian national team.
