= Mitch Dening =

Australian baseball player (born 1988)

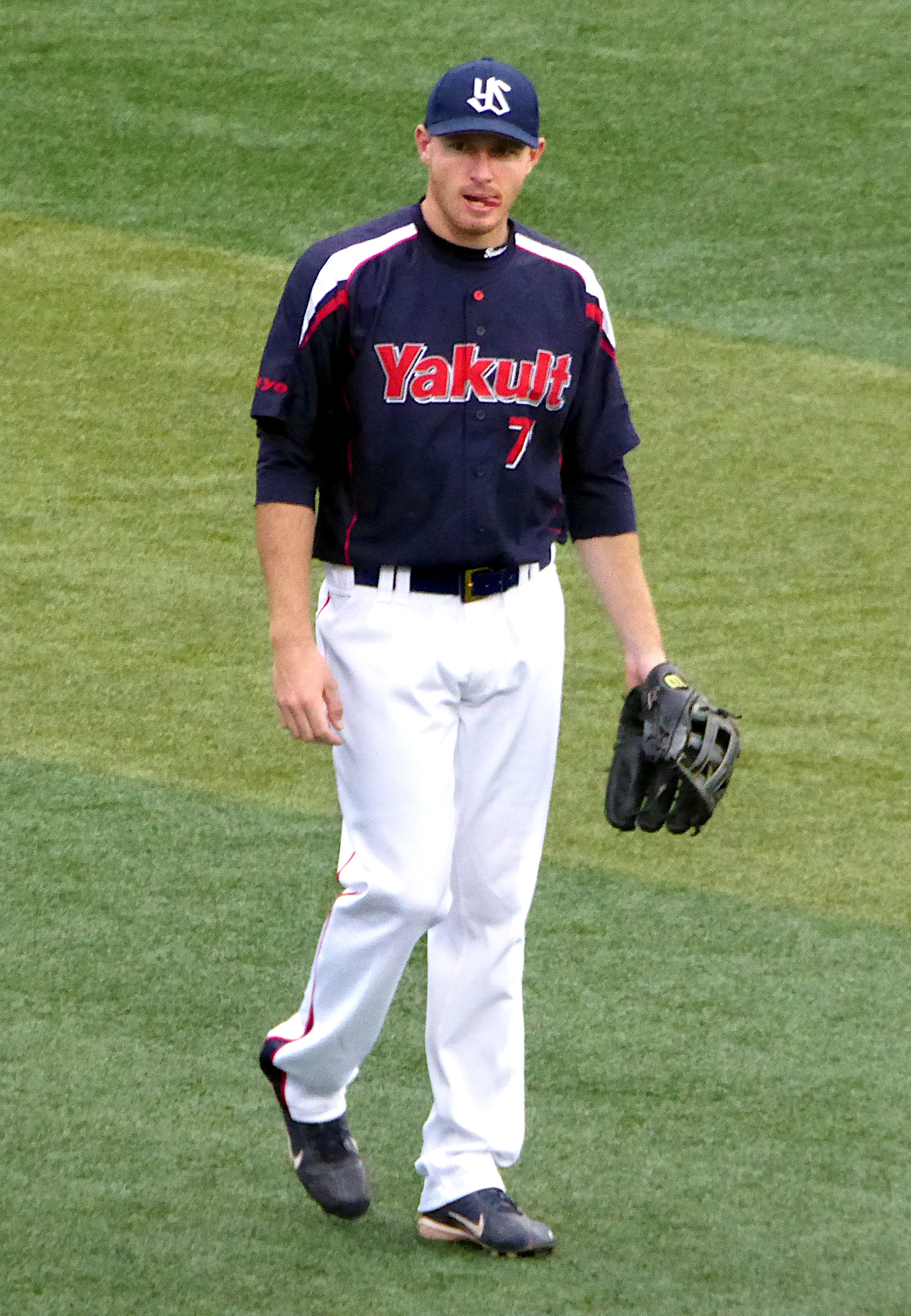
- Outfielder
- Born: 17 August 1988 (age 38); Toowoon Bay, New South Wales, Australia
- Batted: Left Threw: Right

NPB debut
- 27 May, 2015, for the Tokyo Yakult Swallows

Last NPB appearance
- 15 September, 2015, for the Tokyo Yakult Swallows

NPB statistics
- Batting average: .222
- Home runs: 4
- Run batted in: 22
- Stats at Baseball Reference

Teams
- Tokyo Yakult Swallows (2015)
Medals
Men's baseball
Representing Australia
Haarlem Baseball Week
Bronze medal – third place	2016 Haarlem	National team

Mitchell John Dening (born 17 August 1988) is an Australian former professional baseball outfielder. He played in Nippon Professional Baseball (NPB) for the Tokyo Yakult Swallows.

== Career ==
=== Early career in Australia ===
In Australia, he played for the Auburn Orioles and Belmont Baseball Club in the New South Wales Major League and Newcastle Baseball League respectively. He won MVP whilst at the New South Wales Institute of Sport in 2005.

Dening started his overseas baseball career by touring South Africa with the Australian Schoolboys team in 2005. He then signed with the Red Sox in 2005 after being scouted by Jon Deeble at the MLB Academy on the Gold Coast, Australia. In the 2007 Claxton Shield, he averaged .316 for Australian Provincial in a fine debut.

=== Boston Red Sox Organisation ===
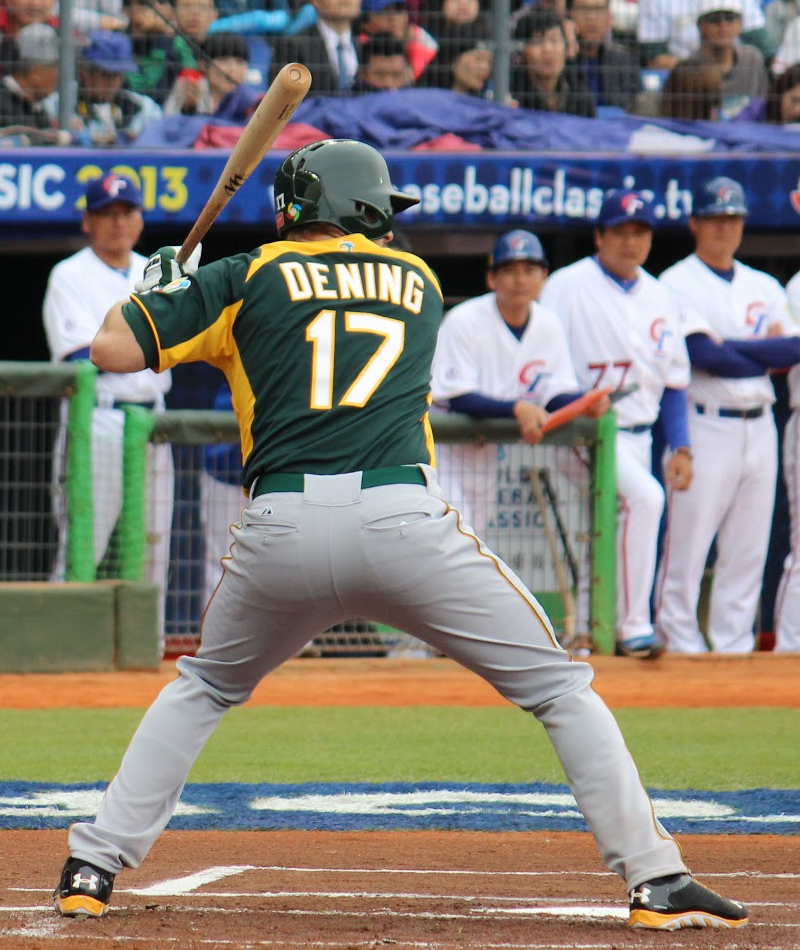
Dening batting for the Australia national team in 2013 World Baseball Classic

In 2007 in his first season in the United States he had some success, hitting a .301/.372/.375 clip as an OF/1B for the GCL Red Sox.

In 2008, he hit .321/.375/.471 with the Lowell Spinners, coached by Australia national baseball team coach Jon Deeble. Dening was fifth in the New York–Penn League in batting average. Returning to Australian in the off season of 2008, Dening hit.409/.458/.545 in the 2008 Claxton Shield. He then made the Australia roster for the 2009 World Baseball Classic. He went 0–1 in the Classic.

In 2009, he playing for Greenville Drive in the South Atlantic League and hit .261/.333/.361/.693 playing mostly in the outfield.

In 2010, he moved to A+ with the Salem Red Sox in the Carolina League showing signs of steady growth as he hit .274/.345/.363/.709. Dening would then return to Australia to play for the Sydney Blue Sox in the winter break.

Dening's last season in the Red Sox organisation would come in AA with the Portland Sea Dogs in the Eastern League where he hit a paltry .220/.303/ .352/.656.

He was released by the Red Sox on 31 March 2012.

=== Washington Wild Things ===
In 2012, after a season batting .280 back in his home country, Dening signed for the Washington Wild Things of the independent Frontier League. However it was not to be a successful season with club as he hit only .191

Dening would spend the 2012 seasons playing in the Australian Baseball League with the Sydney Blue Sox hitting .347

=== Niigata Albirex Baseball Club ===
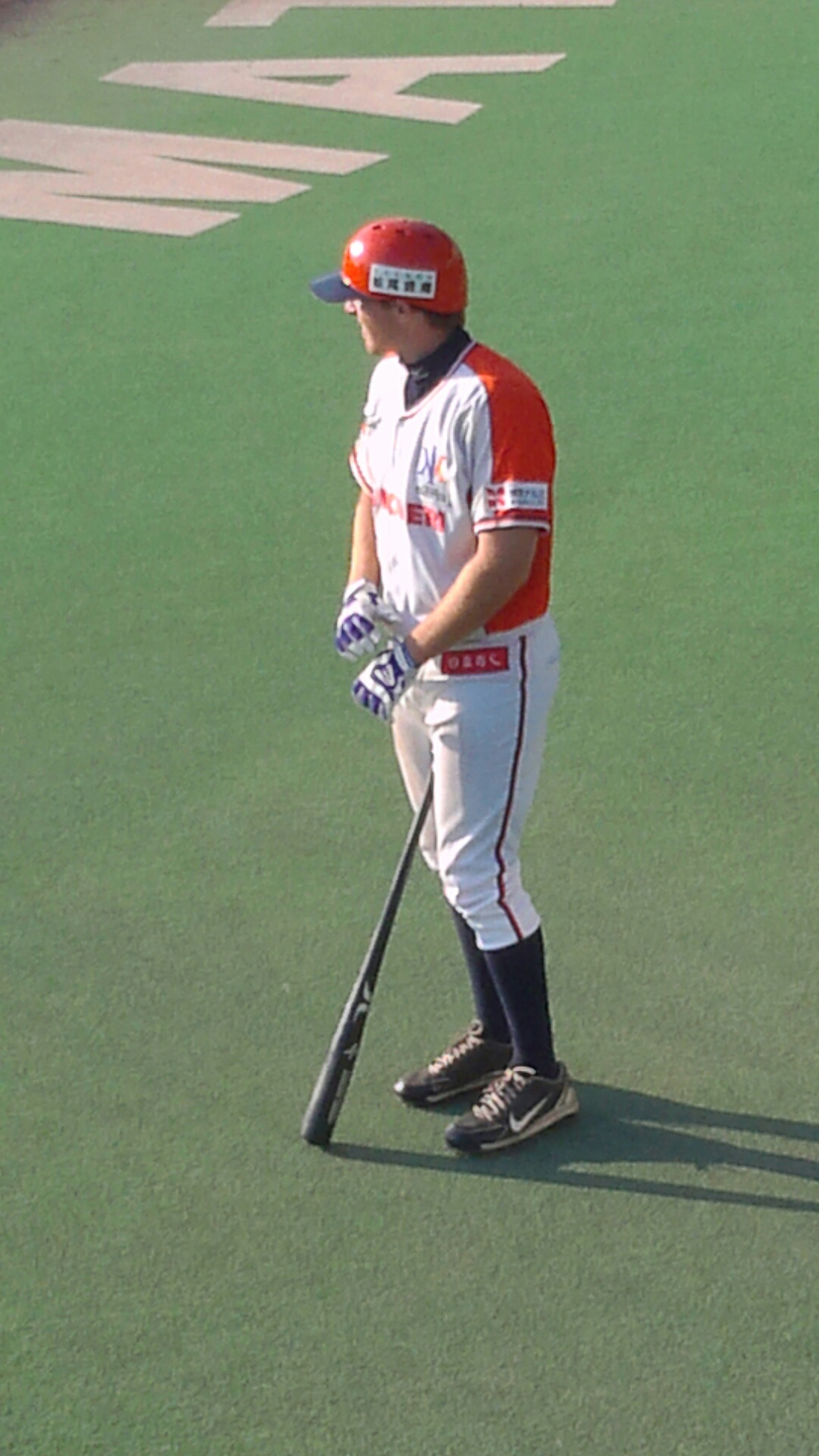
Dening with Niigata Albirex (23 September 2013)

On 27 May 2013, it was announced that Dening had signed for Niigata Albirex Baseball Club in the Japanese independent Baseball Challenge League.

During the regular season, Dening played in 44 matches hitting .370 and winning batting champion honours. In November at the end of the year, Dening played with the Canberra Cavalry in the 2013 Asia Series hitting 5 in the final to lead the team to the title.

In the 2014 Baseball Challenge league season, Dening played in 72 matches averaging .312 and hitting 12 home runs where at the season's end he returned to Australia to play for the Adelaide Bite.

In 2015 up to the middle of May, he was averaging .270 with one home run and 14 RBIs.

=== Tokyo Yakult Swallows ===
On 22 May 2016, it was announced that Dening had signed with the Tokyo Yakult Swallows of Nippon Professional Baseball. He became the first Australian playing in the Baseball Challenge League to sign for an NPB team.

Due to long-term injuries to Wladimir Balentien and Lastings Milledge it was hoped that Dening could fill a hole in the line-up based on his independent league form.

Dening made his debut on the same day as his presentation to the media playing as a pinch hitter against the Hokkaido Nippon Ham Fighters at Meiji Jingu Stadium. On 29 May, Dening hit his first NPB homerun in a game against the Fukuoka SoftBank Hawks. He would then go on to hit his first grand slam on 7 June against the Chiba Lotte Marines. However, with the return of Milledge to the team, Dening was dropped from the side where he found himself out of favour. He finished the season having played 64 games registering 4 homeruns and 22 RBIs. While he was listed for possible action in the 2015 Japan Series he did not see any further action during the season.

Dening was released by the Swallows on 22 December 2015.

=== Ehime Mandarin Pirates ===
On 11 March 2016, it was announced that Dening would be returning to Japanese independent league baseball with the Ehime Mandarin Pirates of the Shikoku Island League Plus. In the opening season, Dening helped the Pirates to victory pulling the team along with an impressive .389 batting average with 2 homeruns and 23 RBIs. On 28 July, Dening was released by the team.

On 5 October 2016, it was announced that Dening would be returning to the Australian Baseball League and the Adelaide Bite for the 2016-2017 season after missing the previous season. He finished the season with a league high .340 batting average, and tied with Aaron Whitefield for total bases with 77.

He represented Australia in the 2017 World Baseball Classic, but has not played professional baseball since the tournament.
