= Billy Turner (American football) =

American football player (born 1991)

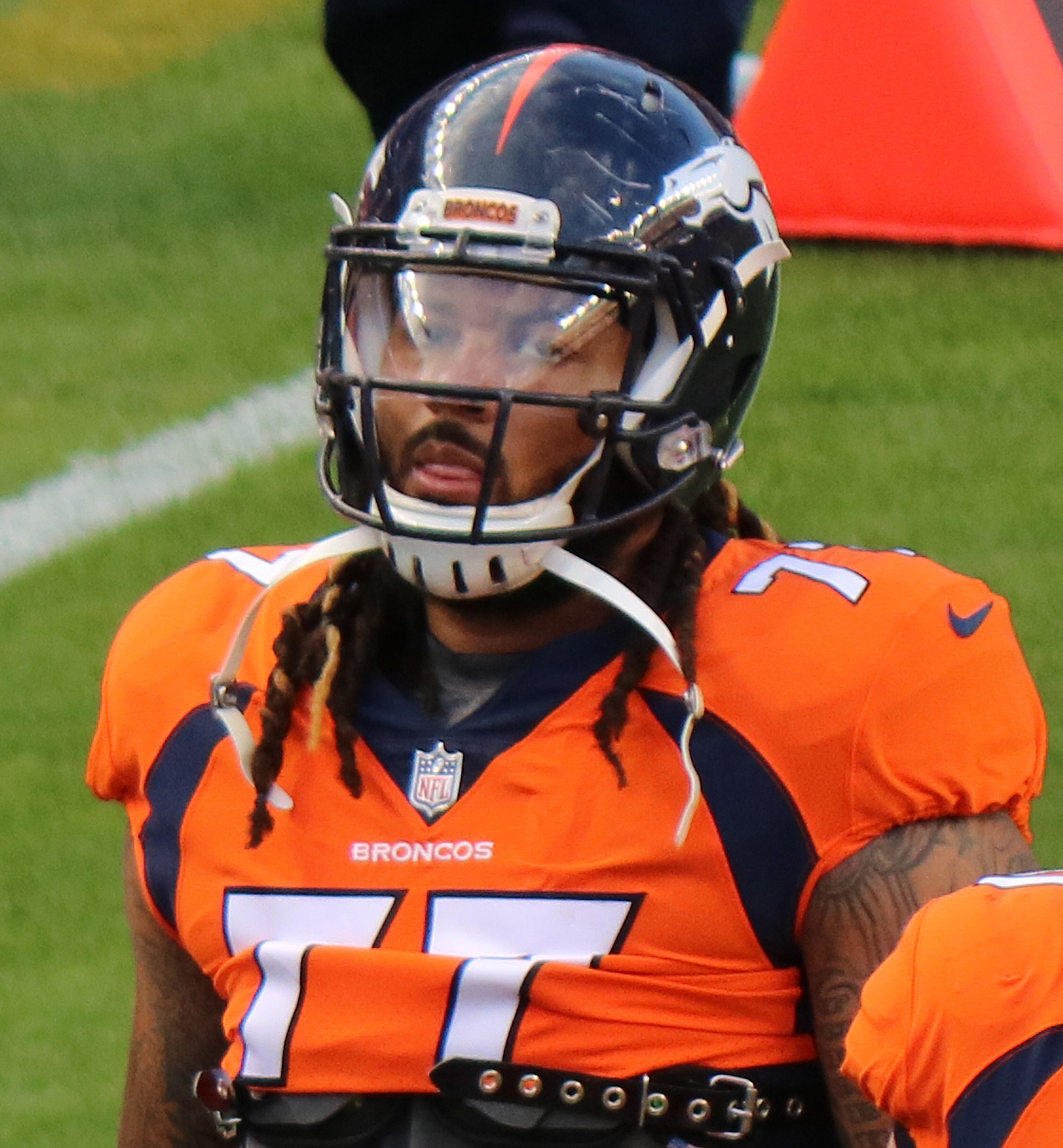
- Turner with the Denver Broncos in 2017

No. 54, 57, 70, 77
- Position: Offensive tackle

Personal information
- Born: October 17, 1991 (age 35); Shoreview, Minnesota, U.S.
- Listed height: 6 ft 5 in (1.96 m)
- Listed weight: 313 lb (142 kg)

Career information
- High school: Mounds View (Arden Hills, Minnesota)
- College: North Dakota State (2010–2013)
- NFL draft: 2014: 3rd round, 67th overall pick

Career history
- Miami Dolphins (2014–2016); Baltimore Ravens (2016); Denver Broncos (2016–2018); Green Bay Packers (2019–2021); Denver Broncos (2022); New York Jets (2023)

Awards and highlights
- 3× FCS national champion (2011–2013); 2× FCS All-American (2012, 2013); 2× First-team All-MVFC (2012, 2013)

Career NFL statistics
- Games played: 105
- Games started: 77
- Stats at Pro Football Reference

William Mason Turner (born October 17, 1991) is an American former professional football player who was an offensive tackle in the National Football League (NFL). He was selected by the Miami Dolphins in the third round of the 2014 NFL draft. He played college football for the North Dakota State Bison.

== Early life ==
Turner attended Mounds View High School in Arden Hills, Minnesota. He was an all-state lineman for the Mustangs football team, helping compile a 26–8 record, winning section titles, and advancing to state playoffs all three years during his career.

== College career ==
Turner attended North Dakota State University from 2010 to 2013. In 2010, Turner started in 12 games. In 2011, he started 14 games. In 2012, Turner started in 15 games and was named to the all-Missouri Valley Football Conference (MVFC) first-team. In 2013, he made all 15 starts at left tackle and was responsible for zero quarterback sacks. He was named All-MVFC first-team and two-time Offensive Lineman of the Week. He was a consensus Football Championship Subdivision (FCS) All-American in 2012 and 2013 and was part of three FCS national championship teams. He participated in the 2014 Senior Bowl. He was one of the top small-school prospects of the 2014 NFL draft.

== Professional career ==
=== Pre-draft ===
Pre-draft measurables
Height	Weight	Arm length	Hand span	40-yard dash	10-yard split	20-yard split	20-yard shuttle	Three-cone drill	Vertical jump	Broad jump	Bench press
6 ft 4 7/8 in (1.95 m)	315 lb (143 kg)	34 in (0.86 m)	10 in (0.25 m)	5.16 s	1.82 s	3.04 s	4.71 s	7.92 s	28.0 in (0.71 m)	9 ft 0 in (2.74 m)	25 reps
All values from NFL Combine

Projected as a second-to-third round selection by CBS Sports, Turner was the highest selected North Dakota State player since Lamar Gordon in 2002.

=== Miami Dolphins ===
Turner was selected in the third round (67th overall) by the Miami Dolphins.

On October 9, 2016, Turner was forced into the starting lineup with starting left tackle, Branden Albert, out with an illness, and backup left tackle, Laremy Tunsil, out with an injured ankle. After giving up 3 sacks and 2 quarterback pressures in a game against the Tennessee Titans, Turner was released by the Dolphins, alongside Dallas Thomas.

=== Baltimore Ravens ===
On October 12, 2016, Turner was claimed off waivers by the Baltimore Ravens, but was released three days later.

=== Denver Broncos (first stint) ===
On October 17, 2016, Turner was claimed off waivers by the Denver Broncos.

On October 17, 2017, Turner was placed on injured reserve after suffering a broken hand in Week 6 against the New York Giants.

On March 17, 2018, Turner re-signed with the Broncos. He started 11 games, four at right tackle in place of an injured Jared Veldheer, and the final seven games of the year at left guard in place of an injured Max Garcia.

=== Green Bay Packers ===
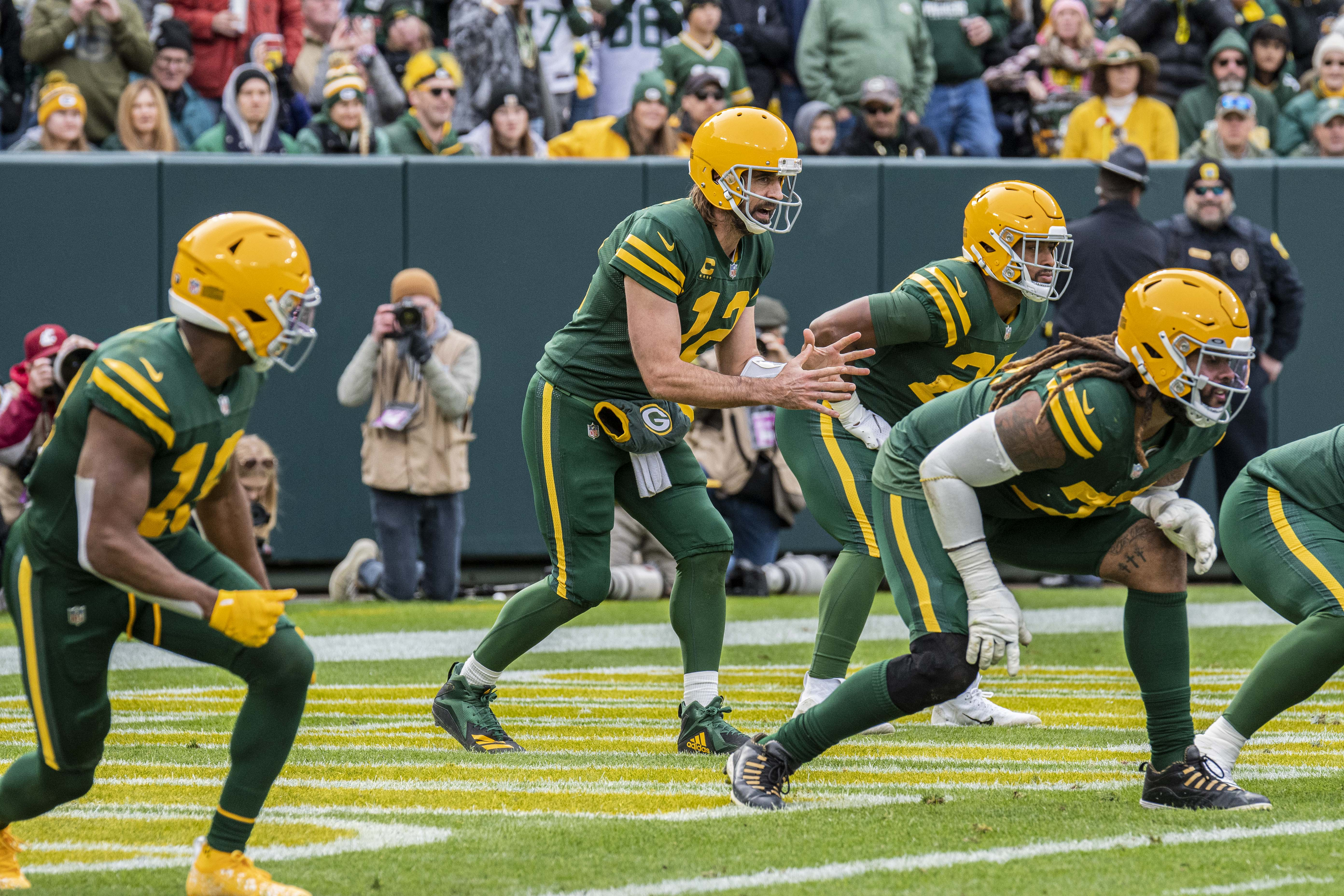
Turner (right) playing for the Green Bay Packers in 2021

On March 14, 2019, Turner signed a four-year, $28 million contract with the Green Bay Packers. Turner started the first thirteen games of the 2021 season at right tackle before sustaining a knee injury during the Packers' week 14 game against the Chicago Bears and missing the rest of the regular season. Dennis Kelly started at right tackle for the remainder of the regular season. The Packers finished the season with the No. 1 seed in the National Football Conference (NFC) with a 13–4 record. Upon his return from injury, he started at left tackle during the Packers' divisional round playoff loss to the San Francisco 49ers in place of the injured David Bakhtiari, while Kelly started at right tackle.

On March 14, 2022, the Packers released Turner.

=== Denver Broncos (second stint) ===
On March 28, 2022, Turner signed a one-year contract with the Broncos. He was placed on injured reserve on November 15, 2022. He was activated on December 17. During the off-season, he became a free agent and reported that he doubted he would be re-signed by the Broncos.

=== New York Jets ===
On May 1, 2023, the New York Jets signed Turner to a one-year deal with a max of $3.15M, reuniting him with former Packers teammate, Aaron Rodgers, and former Packers offensive coordinator & former Broncos head coach, Nathaniel Hackett.

== Personal life ==
Turner's father, Maurice Turner, was a former NFL running back. His half-brother, Bryan Kehl, played in the NFL as a linebacker.
