= Grindstone Lake (disambiguation) =

Grindstone Lake may refer to:

- Grindstone Lake (Kenora District), a lake in Kenora District, Ontario
- Grindstone Lake (Frontenac County) a lake in Frontenac County, Ontario
- Grindstone Lake (Muskoka District), a lake in Muskoka District, Ontario
- Grindstone Lake (Algoma District), a lake in Algoma District, Ontario
- Grindstone Lake in Montezuma County, Colorado
- Grindstone Lake in Pine County, Minnesota
- Grindstone Lake in Sawyer County, Wisconsin
- Grindstone Pond, a small lake in Franklin County, Maine
- Grindstone Pond, a small lake in Piscataquis County, Maine
- Grindstone Reservoir in Crook County, Oregon
- Grindstone Tank, a small lake in Coconino County, Arizona
- Grindstone Tank, a small lake in Yavapai County, Arizona
- Grindstone Tank, a small lake in La Salle County, Texas
