= Ryan Searle =

Ryan Searle may refer to:

- Ryan Searle (darts player) (born 1987), English darts player
- Ryan Searle (baseball) (born 1989), Australian baseball pitcher
