= Ney Nature Center =

- Location within Minnesota
- Location: Le Sueur County, Minnesota - near Henderson.
- Coordinates: 44°32′24″N 93°53′09″W
- Area: 446 acres (1.80 km^{2})
- Established: 1990
- Governing body: Le Sueur County
- Website: Ney Center Website

The Ney Nature Center is a 446-acre (180 ha) nature center and county park in Le Sueur County in the U.S. state of Minnesota. The park is named after the Ney family, who originally lived where the park is. The park is located on a bluff overlooking the Minnesota River Valley near Henderson Station.

The park is located along MN State Highway 19, just west of U.S. 169.

== Activities ==
Activities at the Ney Nature Center include hiking, mountain biking, cross-country skiing, snowshoeing, geocaching, maple-syrup making, and educational programs.

== See also ==
- List of nature centers in Minnesota
