= 2016–17 Australian Baseball League season =

- League: Australian Baseball League
- Sport: Baseball
- Duration: 17 November 2016 – 11 February 2017
- Games: 119
- Teams: 6
- Total attendance: 87,475

Regular season
- Season MVP: Aaron Whitefield

Championship Series
- Venue: Melbourne Ballpark
- Champions: Brisbane Bandits (2nd title)
- Runners-up: Melbourne Aces

Seasons
- ← 2015–16 2017–18 →

The 2016–17 Australian Baseball League season was the seventh Australian Baseball League (ABL) season, and was held from 17 November 2016 to 11 February 2017.

== Teams ==

Teams in the ABL
Team	State / Territory	Stadium
Adelaide Bite	South Australia	Diamond Sports Stadium
Brisbane Bandits	Queensland	Brisbane Exhibition Ground
Canberra Cavalry	Australian Capital Territory	Narrabundah Ballpark
Melbourne Aces	Victoria	Melbourne Ballpark
Perth Heat	Western Australia	Baseball Park
Sydney Blue Sox	New South Wales	Blue Sox Stadium

== Regular season ==
=== Standings ===
Team	Pld	W	L	GB	PCT	Home	Away	Qualification
Melbourne Aces	40	26	14	—	.650	13–7	13–7	Championship Series
Adelaide Bite	40	23	17	3	.575	12–8	11–9	Preliminary final
Brisbane Bandits	39	21	18	4.5	.538	11–8	10–10	Preliminary final
Canberra Cavalry	40	20	20	6	.500	11–9	9–11	
Sydney Blue Sox	39	15	24	10.5	.385	11–9	4–15	
Perth Heat	40	14	26	12	.350	10–10	4–16	

=== Statistical leaders ===
Batting leaders
Stat	Player (Note: Minimum 2.7 PAs per team game.)	Team	Total
AVG	Mitch Dening	Adelaide Bite	.340
HR	Mitch Nilsson Mike Walker Stone Garrett	Brisbane Bandits Melbourne Aces Sydney Blue Sox	7
RBI	Mitch Dening	Adelaide Bite	27
R	Aaron Whitefield	Brisbane Bandits	34
H	Aaron Whitefield	Brisbane Bandits	53
SB	Aaron Whitefield	Brisbane Bandits	20

Pitching leaders
Stat	Player (Note: Minimum 0.8 IP per team game.)	Team	Total
W	Mark Hamburger	Melbourne Aces	5
L	Mike Lee Tom Bailey	Perth Heat Perth Heat	6
ERA	Mark Hamburger	Melbourne Aces	1.90
K	Mark Hamburger	Melbourne Aces	86
IP	Mark Hamburger	Melbourne Aces	75 2/3
SV	Ryan Searle	Brisbane Bandits	9

== Postseason ==
=== Bracket ===
Preliminary Final Series			Championship Series
			1	Melbourne Aces	0
2	Adelaide Bite	1	3	Brisbane Bandits	2
3	Brisbane Bandits	2

=== Preliminary Final Series ===
==== Game 1 ====
3 February 2017 19:00 (UTC+10:30) at Diamond Sports Stadium in Adelaide
Team	1	2	3	4	5	6	7	8	9	R	H	E
Brisbane Bandits	0	0	0	0	0	0	0	3	0	3	8	0
Adelaide Bite	0	0	0	0	0	1	0	0	0	1	4	1
WP: Zac Treece (1–0) LP: Matthew Williams (0–1) Sv: Ryan Searle (1); Boxscore

==== Game 2 ====
4 February 2017 18:00 (UTC+10:00) at AFA Stadium at Holloway Field in Brisbane (F/12)
Team	1	2	3	4	5	6	7	8	9	10	11	12	R	H	E
Adelaide Bite	3	0	0	0	0	0	1	0	0	0	0	4	8	15	2
Brisbane Bandits	1	2	0	0	1	0	0	0	0	0	0	0	4	8	1
WP: Zach Cooper (1–0) LP: Ryan Searle (0–1); Home runs: ADE: Marcus Greene Jr (1), Mitch Dening (1); BRI: Aaron Whitefield (1), Wade Dutton (1); Boxscore

==== Game 3 ====
5 February 2017 13:00 (UTC+10:00) at AFA Stadium at Holloway Field in Brisbane
Team	1	2	3	4	5	6	7	8	9	R	H	E
Adelaide Bite	0	0	0	0	1	0	0	1	0	2	6	0
Brisbane Bandits	0	0	0	1	1	2	6	8	X	18	23	3
WP: Rick Teasley (1–0) LP: Hei Chun Lee (0–1); Home runs: ADE: Stefan Welch (1), Jordan McArdle (1); BRI: Trent Oeltjen (1), Ryan Battaglia 2 (2), Logan Wade (1), Mitch Nilsson 2 (2), David Rodriguez (1); Boxscore

==== Composite Line Score ====
2017 ABL Preliminary Final Series (2–1): Brisbane Bandits over Adelaide Bite

Team	1	2	3	4	5	6	7	8	9	10	11	12	R	H	E
Brisbane Bandits	1	2	0	1	2	2	6	11	0	0	0	0	25	41	4
Adelaide Bite	3	0	0	0	1	1	1	1	0	0	0	4	11	25	2

=== Championship Series ===
==== Game 1 ====
10 February 2017 19:30 (UTC+11:00) at Melbourne Ballpark in Melbourne
Team	1	2	3	4	5	6	7	8	9	R	H	E
Brisbane Bandits	2	1	1	0	0	0	0	2	0	6	10	0
Melbourne Aces	0	2	0	0	0	0	0	0	0	2	8	0
WP: Rick Teasley (1–0) LP: Mark Hamburger (0–1); Home runs: BRI: Trent Oeltjen (1), David Rodriguez (1), Logan Wade (1), Kevin Padlo (1); MEL: None; Boxscore

==== Game 2 ====
11 February 2017 18:30 (UTC+11:00) at Melbourne Ballpark in Melbourne
Team	1	2	3	4	5	6	7	8	9	R	H	E
Brisbane Bandits	0	1	0	0	0	2	0	0	0	3	8	0
Melbourne Aces	0	0	0	1	0	0	0	0	0	1	4	0
WP: Kramer Champlin (1–0) LP: Jon Kennedy (0–1) Sv: Ryan Searle (1); Home runs: BRI: None; MEL: Cody Jones (1); Boxscore

==== Composite Line Score ====
2017 ABL Championship Series (2–0): Brisbane Bandits over Melbourne Aces

Team	1	2	3	4	5	6	7	8	9	R	H	E
Brisbane Bandits	2	2	1	0	0	2	0	2	0	9	18	0
Melbourne Aces	0	2	0	1	0	0	0	0	0	3	12	0
