= Mounds View High School =

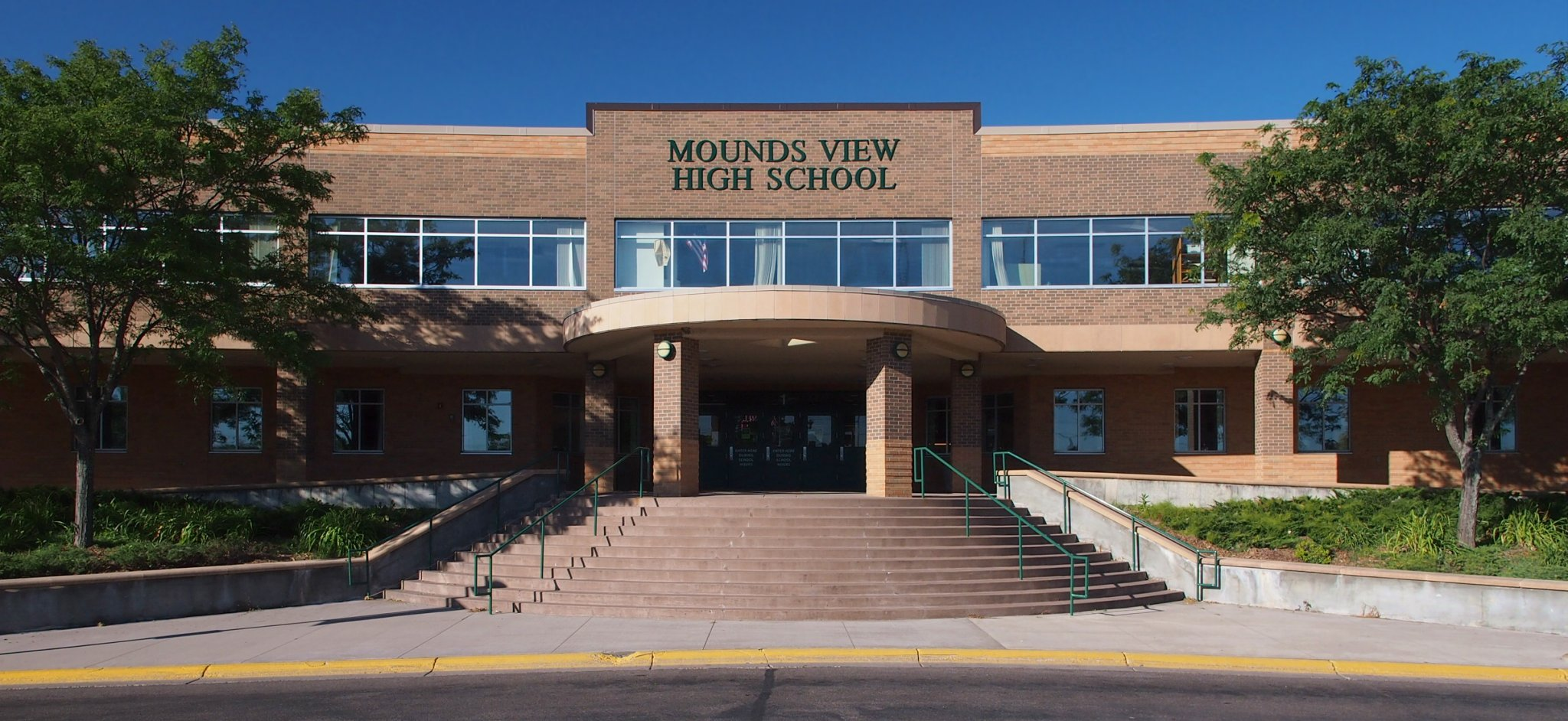
- Mounds View High School in 2015

Location
- 1900 Lake Valentine Road, Arden Hills, Minnesota 55112; United States; 45°3′50″N 93°10′51″W

Information
- Type: Public
- Established: 1955
- School district: Mounds View Public Schools
- CEEB code: 241-805
- Principal: Rob Reetz
- Teaching staff: 69.36 (FTE)
- Grades: 9 to 12
- Enrollment: 1,836 (2025–2026)
- Student to teacher ratio: 27.41
- Colors: Green and White
- Athletics conference: Suburban East Conference
- Mascot: Mustang
- Nickname: Mustangs
- Team name: Mounds View Mustangs
- Rivals: Irondale Knights
- Accreditation: North Central Association of Colleges and Schools
- Newspaper: The Viewer
- Yearbook: The Vista
- Athletic Director: Jim Galvin
- Website: moundsview.mvpschools.org

Mounds View High School is a public high school in Arden Hills, Minnesota, enrolling approximately 1,800 students in grades 9-12. Along with Irondale High School, it is one of two high schools operated by Mounds View Public Schools (District 621). Located in a suburban area of the Twin Cities about nine miles north of downtown Minneapolis and St. Paul, its attendance area includes parts of Arden Hills, Shoreview, North Oaks, Roseville, and Vadnais Heights. Since 2014, it has been a member of the Suburban East Conference of the Minnesota State High School League.

== Academics and recognition ==
U.S. News & World Report ranks Mounds View High School among Minnesota's top 10 high schools according to performance on state-required tests, graduation, and college preparation. Through the Post Secondary Enrollment Options (PSEO) program, students may take classes at institutions in the Minnesota State Colleges and Universities system. The average ACT score at Mounds View High School is 25.4 (2016), compared to the state average of 21.1, with 99% of the senior class taking the ACT.

The school's Science Olympiad team frequently ranks first in the state and in the top ten nationwide, finishing as high as second place at the 2014 Science Olympiad national tournament and fifth at the 2015 and 2018 tournaments.

== Notable alumni ==
- Brett Bateman, professional baseball player
- Sydney Brodt, ice hockey player for the PWHPA and the American national team
- Kate Brown, 38th governor of Oregon
- Kelly Catlin, cyclist and Olympian at the 2016 Summer Olympics
- Kyra Condie, rock climber and Olympian at the 2020 Summer Olympics
- Mark Hamburger, professional baseball player
- Sam Hentges, professional baseball player
- Nick Horvath, professional basketball player
- Natalie Hudson, chief justice of the Minnesota Supreme Court
- Mark Landsberger, professional basketball player
- Alice Lee, chess International Master
- Brandon H. Lee, actor and stunt performer known for his roles in Shang Chi and Cobra Kai
- Rob McClanahan, professional hockey player
- Seth Rosin, professional baseball player
- Chris Stedman, author
- Billy Turner, professional football player
- Adam Weber, professional football player
- Yishan Wong, former CEO of Reddit and member of the PayPal Mafia

== See also ==
- List of high schools in Minnesota
