= Grindstone Lake (Minnesota) =

Lake in the state of Minnesota, United States

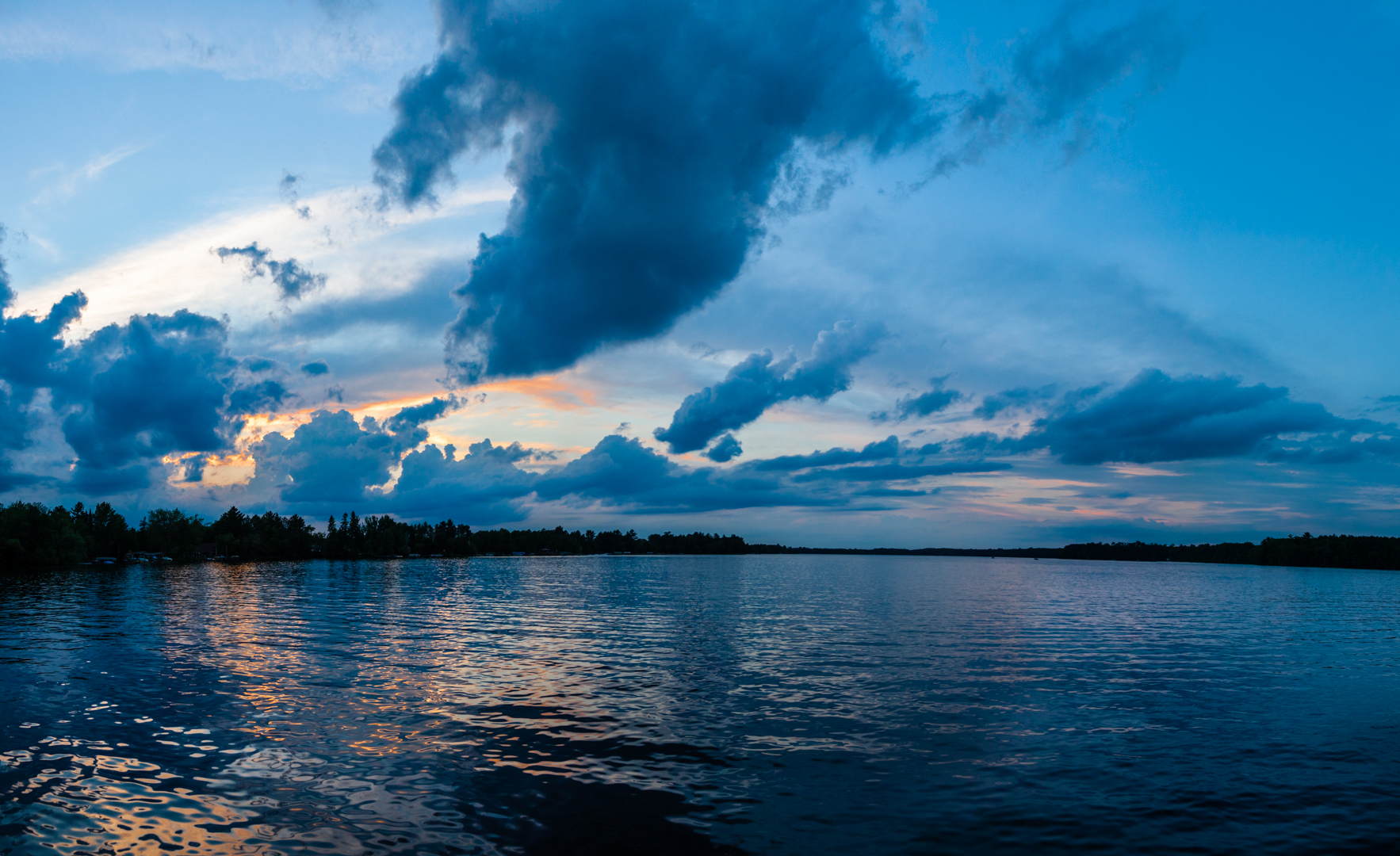

- Location within Minnesota
- Location: Pine County, Minnesota
- Coordinates: 46°07′19″N 093°00′27″W
- Lake type: freshwater
- Basin countries: United States
- Max. length: approx. 2 mi (3.2 km)
- Max. width: approx. 0.5 mi (0.80 km)
- Surface area: 528.18 acres (213.75 ha)
- Max. depth: 153 ft (47 m)
- Surface elevation: 1,094.5 ft (333.6 m)

Grindstone Lake is a large freshwater lake located in Dell Grove Township, Pine County, in east-central Minnesota approximately 6.5 miles (10.5 km) west of Sandstone, Minnesota. The lake is roughly oval shaped being approximately 2 miles (3.2 km) in length north to south and 0.5 miles (0.80 km) east to west, and a maximum depth of 153 feet (47 m). The lake has several small streams that drain the area wetlands and is considered the headwater for the Grindstone River. The lake's name is a translation from the Ojibwe zhiigwanaabikokaa-zaaga'igan (Lake abundant with grind stones). Sandstone taken from near the lake was used to make sharpening stones. The lake, North Fork Grindstone River and the lower course of the Grindstone River are depicted on the 1757 Mitchell Map.

Grindstone Lake is a popular resort area drawing cabin owners and visitors from the Minneapolis-St. Paul metropolitan area. It also features a sea plane base, a religious summer camp, and a nature education center.

== See also ==
- Audubon Center of the North Woods
