= Mark Hamburger =

American baseball player (born 1987)

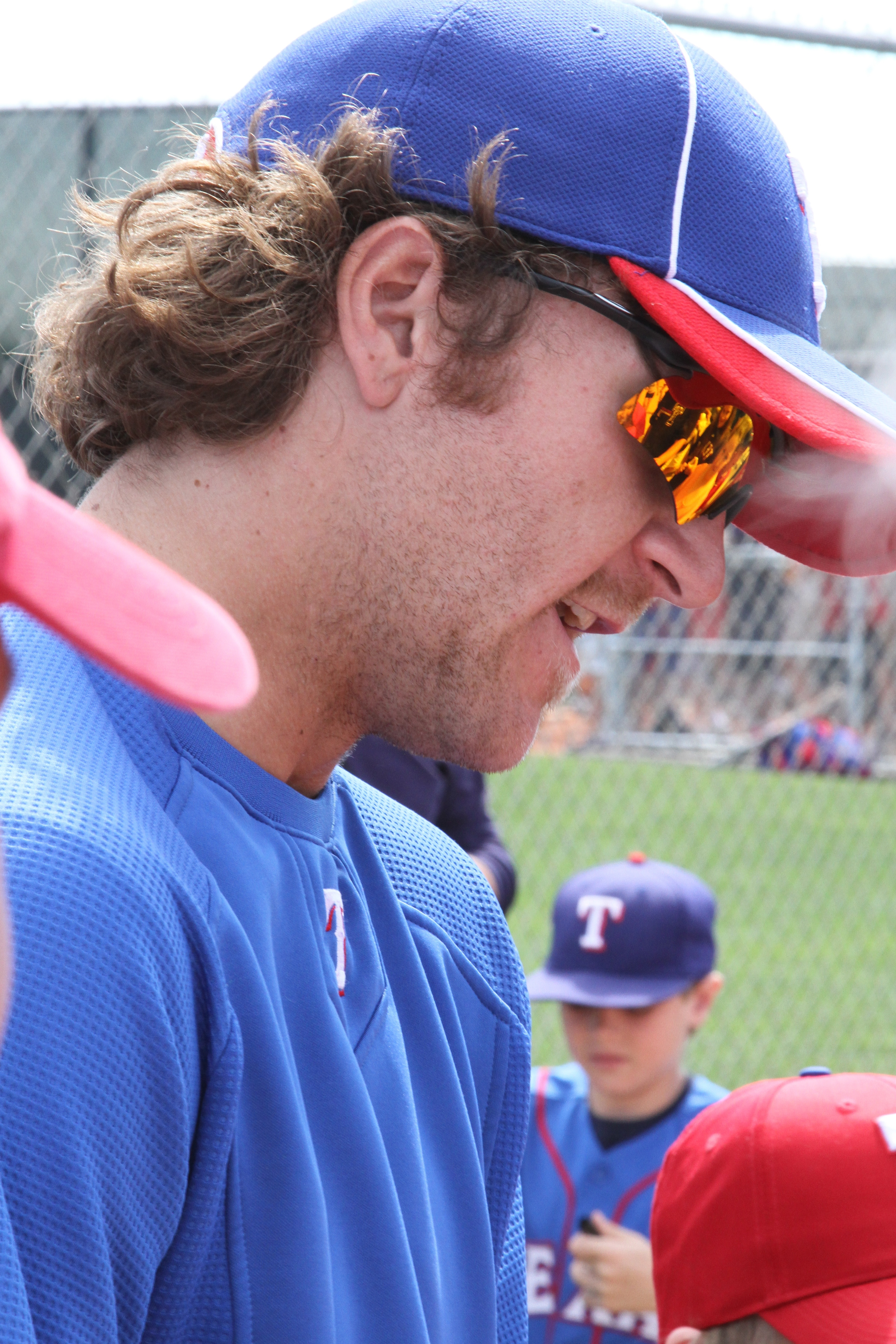
- Hamburger at spring training in 2012
- Pitcher
- Born: February 5, 1987 (age 39); St. Paul, Minnesota, U.S.
- Batted: Right Threw: Right

MLB debut
- August 31, 2011, for the Texas Rangers

Last MLB appearance
- September 26, 2011, for the Texas Rangers

MLB statistics
- Win–loss record: 1–0
- Earned run average: 4.50
- Strikeouts: 6
- Stats at Baseball Reference

Teams
- Texas Rangers (2011)

Mark John Hamburger (born February 5, 1987) is an American former professional baseball pitcher who played in Major League Baseball (MLB) for the Texas Rangers in 2011.

== Early life ==
Hamburger attended Mounds View High School in Arden Hills, Minnesota and was a multi-sport athlete playing basketball, rugby, tennis, football, and baseball. After graduating from high school in 2005, Hamburger attended and played baseball at Mesabi Range College where he posted an 11–0 record and a 0.65 ERA.

== Professional career ==
=== Minnesota Twins ===
The summer following Hamburger's season of collegiate baseball, he attended a try-out for the Minnesota Twins that was held at the Metrodome in 2007. Hamburger was signed by the Twins after the try-out, received a $2,000 signing bonus, and was assigned to the Gulf Coast League Twins.

During the 2008 season, Hamburger was assigned to the Elizabethton Twins where he won closer of the year.

=== Texas Rangers ===
After two years in the Twins' minor league system, Hamburger was traded to the Texas Rangers in exchange for Eddie Guardado on August 25, 2008.

Hamburger was called up to the majors for the first time on August 30, 2011. He made five appearances for Texas during his rookie campaign, posting a 1–0 record and 4.50 ERA with six strikeouts over eight innings of work.

Hamburger began the 2012 campaign with the Triple-A Round Rock Express, where he logged an 0–2 record and 6.55 ERA with 37 strikeouts and two saves across 21 appearances (three starts). On June 22, 2012, Hamburger was designated for assignment following the promotion of Roy Oswalt.

=== San Diego Padres ===
Hamburger was claimed off of waivers by the San Diego Padres on June 25, 2012, and was subsequently assigned to the Triple-A Tucson Padres. In five appearances for Tucson, he struggled to an 0–2 record and 7.50 ERA with 11 strikeouts across 12 innings pitched. Hamburger was designated for assignment by San Diego following Jeremy Hermida's activation from the disabled list on July 19.

=== Houston Astros ===
On July 21, 2012, Hamburger was claimed off of waivers by the Houston Astros. He made 17 appearances for the Triple-A Oklahoma City RedHawks, compiling a 1–1 record and 4.71 ERA with 15 strikeouts over 21 innings of work. On September 3, Hamburger was removed from the 40-man roster and sent outright back to Oklahoma City.

On February 13, 2013, Hamburger was released by the Astros organization. On February 25, Hamburger received a 50-game suspension without pay after a second violation of the Minor League Drug Prevention and Treatment Program for a drug of abuse.

=== St. Paul Saints ===
On April 12, 2013, Hamburger signed with the St. Paul Saints of the American Association of Independent Professional Baseball. Hamburger made 21 starts for the Saints, compiling a 6–8 record and 3.26 ERA with 120 strikeouts over 149 innings of work.

=== Minnesota Twins (second stint) ===
On September 4, 2013, the Minnesota Twins signed Hamburger to a minor league contract. In 2014, he made 22 appearances (including seven starts) split between the Double-A New Britain Rock Cats and Triple-A Rochester Red Wings, accumulating a 4–5 record and 3.69 ERA with 54 strikeouts and two saves across 70 2/3 innings pitched.

On October 23, 2014, Hamburger re-signed with the Twins organization on a new minor league contract. He made 45 appearances (including four starts) for Triple-A Rochester during the 2015 season, posting a 4–2 record and 3.31 ERA with 63 strikeouts and one save over 68 innings of work. Hamburger elected free agency following the season on November 6, 2015.

=== St. Paul Saints (second stint) ===
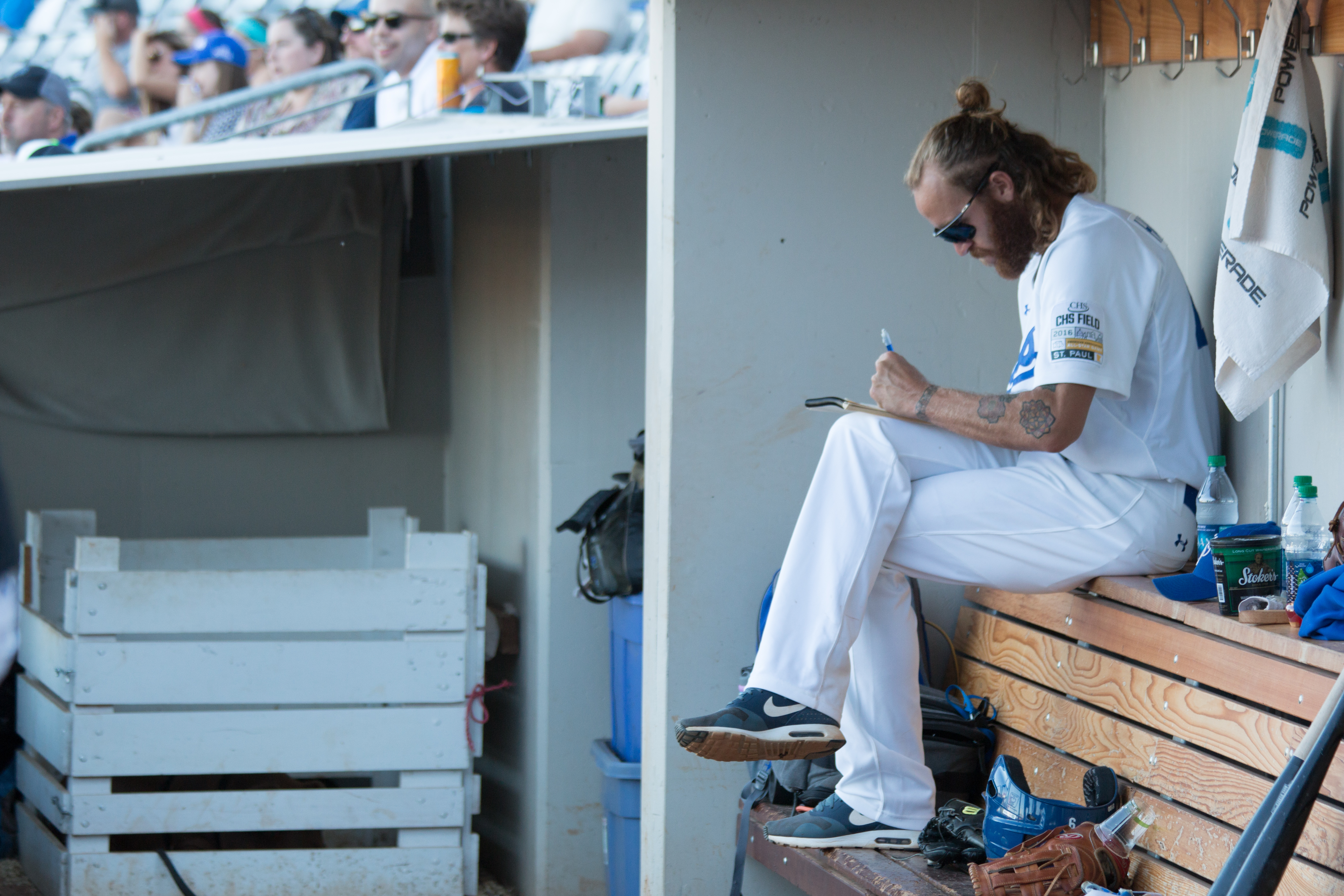
Hamburger with the St. Paul Saints in 2016

On April 12, 2016, Hamburger signed with the St. Paul Saints. In 21 appearances (20 starts) for the Saints, compiling a 12–6 record and 3.29 ERA with 100 strikeouts across 158 2/3 innings pitched.

Hamburger played the Australian Baseball League 2016–17 season with the Melbourne Aces that won the regular season but lost the final to the Brisbane Bandits. He was the league leader for ERA (1.90).

On April 20, 2017, Hamburger re-signed with the Saints. He made 23 appearances (22 starts) for St. Paul, registering a 13–6 record and 3.56 ERA with 115 strikeouts over 172 innings of work.

=== Somerset Patriots ===
On September 11, 2017, Hamburger was traded to the Somerset Patriots of the Atlantic League of Professional Baseball. Hamburger started one game for Somerset, allowing two runs on five hits with three strikeouts across seven innings pitched.

=== New Britain Bees ===
On September 29, 2017, Hamburger was traded back to the Saints. Hamburger returned to the Melbourne Aces of the Australian Baseball League for the 2017/18 season.

On March 23, 2018, Hamburger was traded by the Saints to the New Britain Bees of the Atlantic League of Professional Baseball. He made 21 starts for New Britain during the regular season, compiling a 10–8 record and 4.39 ERA with 86 strikeouts over 127 innings of work. Hamburger became a free agent following the season.
