= Jason Jarvis =

Scottish footballer

Personal information
- Date of birth: 2 October 2000 (age 26)
- Position: Midfielder

Team information
- Current team: Edinburgh City
- Number: 10

Youth career
- Falkirk

Senior career*
Years	Team	Apps	(Gls)
2018–2019	Falkirk	1	(0)
2019–2023	University of Stirling		
2023–2024	Bonnyrigg Rose	8	(1)
2023–2024	→ Broxburn Athletic (loan)		
2024–	Edinburgh City	49	(3)
- * Club domestic league appearances and goals as of 4 May 2026

Jason Jarvis (born 2 October 2000) is a Scottish professional footballer who plays for Scottish League Two club Edinburgh City. He previously played for Falkirk, the University of Stirling, Bonnyrigg Rose and Broxburn Athletic.

== Career ==
Jarvis made his senior debut for Falkirk on 29 December 2018, in a 2–4 league defeat against Dunfermline Athletic.
