= Laurentian Environmental Center =

Coordinates: 47°40′50″N 92°38′0″W

Laurentian Environmental Learning Center (LEC) is an educational outdoors camp area located at Arrowhead Lake in Britt, Minnesota, in the Superior National Forest.

Schools and other organizations go to LEC to learn about the outdoors. It is equipped with activities that enhance recreation skills. The activities provided are also hands on and discovery oriented. The center is well known for their wind energy curriculum. This curriculum is the created by the teamwork of Laurentian Environmental Staff, Minnesota Department of Commerce, Great River Energy and Minnesota Power. It is owned and operated by Mounds View Public Schools. It is accredited by The Commission on International and Trans-Regional Accreditation (CITA).

== Facilities ==
At LEC there are 160 beds for large and small groups. There are also five large classroom halls, a main lodge, and a dining center.

== Attractions ==
- 32 foot climbing wall
- Archery range
- Hiking and skiing trails
- Canoes and rowboats
- Outdoor sauna
- A large playing field
- Outdoor campfire theater area
- "Meteorite Site"

== Programs ==
There are many programs that are available for school groups to attend. There are 18 educational classes that can be taken at the camp to further knowledge on the outdoors and other activities. There are also programs for groups, companies, families, and individuals.
