= Mounds View Public Schools =

School district in Minnesota, United States

Mounds View Schools
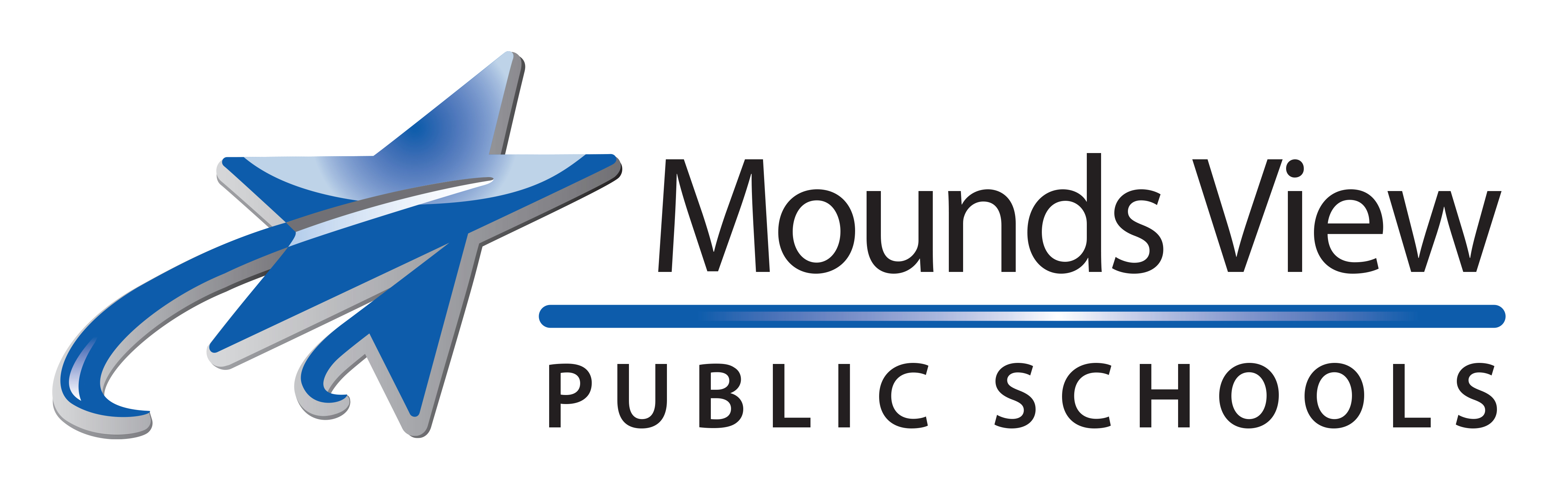

Location
- Arden Hills, Mounds View, New Brighton, North Oaks, Roseville, Shoreview, and Vadnais Heights, Minnesota United States

District information
- Grades: Pre-K-12
- Superintendent: Chris Lennox

Students and staff
- Students: Over 11,000
- Staff: Over 1,400

Other information
- Website: http://www.mvpschools.org/

Mounds View Public School District 621 is a school district serving the cities of Arden Hills, Mounds View, New Brighton, North Oaks, Roseville, Shoreview, Vadnais Heights and parts of Spring Lake Park and White Bear Township in Minnesota. The district operates 14 schools, five education programs, and Laurentian Environmental Center.

== Schools ==
=== High schools ===
According to the U.S. News & World Report, Mounds View High School is in the top ten Minnesota high schools for exceeding expectations with regard to student performance in reading and math and for preparing students for college.

- Irondale High School

Located in New Brighton, Irondale High School was founded in 1967, and serves over 1,700 students.

- Mounds View High School

Located in Arden Hills, Mounds View High School has been an active school in District 621 since 1955, and serves over 1,800 students.

=== Middle schools ===
- Chippewa Middle School

Located in North Oaks, Chippewa serves over 1,100 students.

- Edgewood Middle School

Located in Mounds View, Edgewood serves over 600 students.

- Highview Middle School

Located in New Brighton, Highview serves over than 800 students.

=== Elementary schools ===
Since 2018, elementary schools in the Mounds View School District have served grades 1–5, with kindergartners attending designated kindergarten centers.

- Bel Air Elementary

Located in New Brighton, Bel Air serves over 700 students.

- Island Lake Elementary

Located in Shoreview, Island Lake serves over 700 students in the surrounding area of Shoreview, Vadnais Heights, and Arden Hills.

- Pinewood Elementary School

Located in Mounds View, Pinewood serves over 500 students in grades 1 through 5 from Mounds View and Shoreview.

- Sunnyside Elementary

Located in New Brighton, Sunnyside serves over 500 students from Mounds View and New Brighton.

- Turtle Lake Elementary

Located in Shoreview, Turtle Lake is Mounds View Public School District's largest elementary school, serving over 1,000 students from northern Shoreview.

- Valentine Hills Elementary

Located in Arden Hills, Valentine Hills serves over 600 students from Arden Hills and parts of New Brighton and Roseville.

==== Defunct elementary schools ====
- Red Oak School

Located in Mounds View, Red Oak served students in kindergarten through sixth grade from Mounds View until 1982.

=== Kindergarten centers ===
Since 2018, kindergartners have attended one of two centers dedicated to serving kindergartners only. Both centers are former elementary schools that served K–5. Both also host pre-K programs.

- Pike Lake Education Center

Located in New Brighton, Pike Lake serves over 500 students who go on to attend Bel Air, Pinewood, Sunnyside, or Valentine Hills.

- Snail Lake Education Center

Located in Shoreview, Snail Lake serves over 300 students who go on to attend Island Lake or Turtle Lake.

=== Other programs ===
Other programs offered by Mounds View Public Schools include early childhood education, adult education, and special education.

- Area Learning Center (ALC)

Located in Mounds View, the Area Learning Center is a non-traditional program designed to help students meet their high school graduation requirements.

- Bridges

Located in Shoreview, Bridges provides "rigorous academic instruction, while also focusing on meeting students' behavioral and social skills needs."

- Career & Life Transition Program (CLT)

Career and Life Transition Program is a community-based initiative between the Mounds View Public Schools district and Roseville Area Schools. The CLT program is for students who are 18–21 years old, have transition needs identified in their Individual Education Plan (IEP), and have not received a high school diploma.

- Early Childhood Education Program

The Early Childhood Education Center in New Brighton, Pike Lake Education Center, and Snail Lake Education Center serve families and their children from before birth through kindergarten entry.

- REACH Academy (formerly Oak Grove)

Located in Roseville, REACH Academy offers a special education program for students in grades 8–11.

== Laurentian Environmental Center ==
Fifth- and seventh-grade students in the district may attend a four-day camp at Laurentian Environmental Center in Britt, Minnesota, at which they learn about the wilderness and outdoor survival.
