= Vince Shute Wildlife Sanctuary =

Coordinates: 48.099°N 93.007°W

The Vince Shute Wildlife Sanctuary, located approximately two hours northwest of Duluth, and approximately thirty minutes from Orr, is operated and managed by The American Bear Association (ABA). The mission of the ABA is to promote a better understanding of black bears and all wildlife through education, observation and experience.

The Vince Shute Wildlife Sanctuary consists of 360 acres of forested land home to a large number of bears who visit frequently, thereby providing a unique opportunity to observe them.
