= Audubon Center of the North Woods =

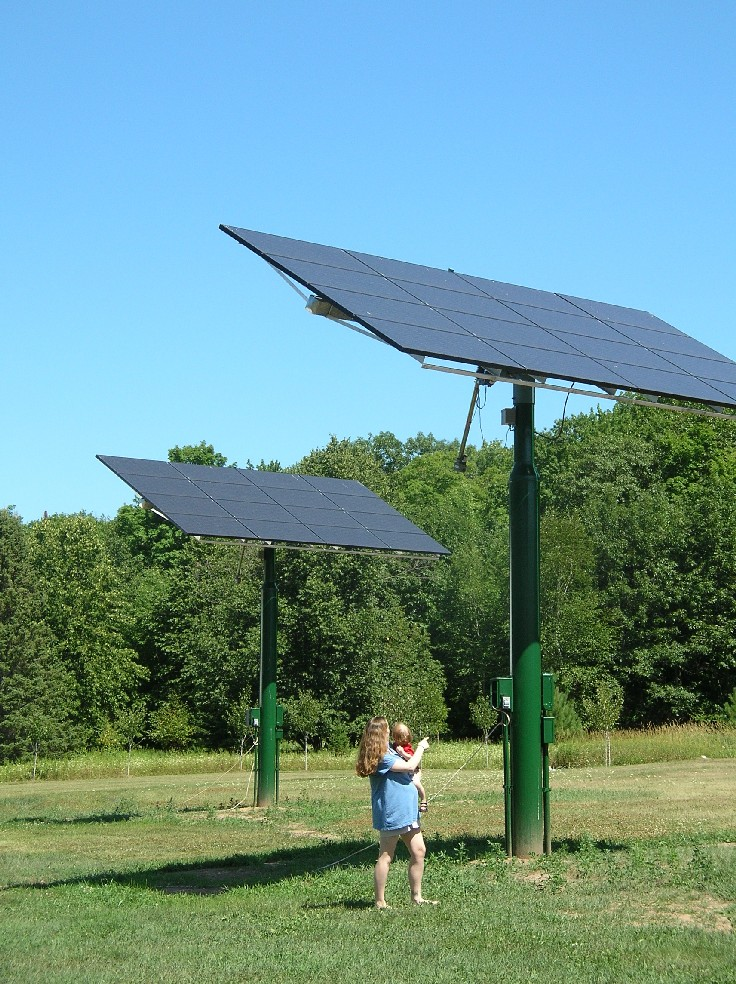
Grid-connected solar arrays at ACNW

Osprey Wilds Environmental Learning Center (ELC), formerly Audubon Center of the North Woods (ACNW), on Grindstone Lake near Sandstone, Minnesota, is a non-profit residential environmental learning center and conference & retreat center.

== About Osprey Wilds ==
Osprey Wilds is a 501(c)(3) public charity, residential environmental learning center and conference & retreat center nestled on the shores of Grindstone Lake in east-central Minnesota.

We are committed to developing an understanding, ethics and responsibility regarding the environment and stewardship through formal and informal teaching that links nature and humans.

It is our goal that every visitor feels connected to the natural environment and feels that the protection of nature is also the protection of humankind.

A healthy environment starts with and is perpetuated by a personal connection to it. We have been providing environmental and outdoor education programs since 1971 and are committed to providing lifelong learning experiences to people of all ages, including programming in natural history and science, team-building, adventure/challenge, wildlife, energy, outdoor skills and human history.

== Outdoor School Programming ==
Osprey Wilds is an accredited K-12 Outdoor School that offers a wide range of educational opportunities for students of all ages through experiential learning. Our staff are ready to support you in planning an amazing overnight field trip, day visit, or on-site programming at your school!

We offer scholarships for schools to help cover the costs of our overnight K-12 programs!

== Food ==
Our kitchen staff provides delicious scratch-cooked meals for visiting groups as well as customized banquet menus, prepared fresh to satisfy every palate. Each meal is served cafeteria style and offers a variety of exceptional cuisine options with a focus on locally grown or organic items. We also grow produce and raise animal on our very own Trapp Farm using organic, no-till practices. We are proud to serve these local products to visitors year-round.

== Lodging ==
Our unique center features a mixture of historic as well as newly constructed facilities that can provide lodging for 162+ and meal service for 200+. We have a variety of comfortable, modern lodging facilities including rooms with private baths, dormitory with shared bath and a 5-BR, 3 bath historic lodge. There are also rustic accommodations in our log cabin, yurt and campground.

== Conferences & Meetings ==
Open year-round, the natural setting and range of facilities and offerings you’ll find here makes us the perfect spot for a variety of conferences or meetings.

An assortment of meeting spaces are available to reserve. Depending on the season, we have indoor and outdoor classrooms available. Our modern facilities can accommodate groups of any size – from large meetings of 200+ to small groups and breakout sessions.

== Weddings ==
Location Our site is nestled on the shore of Grindstone Lake in east-central Minnesota. Only 90 minutes from the Twin Cities, our property offers the beauty of up north—pine forests, quiet shorelines, blooming native prairies, and wildlife—without the intense travel and odious planning, scheduling, and overall headache that comes with a “destination” wedding.

Whether you are watching the sunset by the water, breathing the fresh pine air or celebrating around a campfire—your time can be spent with loved ones, peacefully, and without the distraction of everyday bustle.

Venue Our property is 780-acres and has several different options that can suit your party’s needs. From the groom’s dinner to reception, wedding, and time together, we have space.

Outdoor ceremony area There is something magical about an outdoor wedding. Host your wedding, reception, or both in the great outdoors. Depending on the size of your event, we have several options. We are flexible and happy to help you find your special spot on our property.

Indoor ceremony area If you decide to host your ceremony indoors, we have a beautiful dining hall that has a stunning view of the lake, plenty of natural light and windows so you can enjoy the allure of outdoors with the comforts of the indoors. Enjoy the majestic, floor-to-ceiling stone fireplace—a romantic focal point that is the perfect place to toast a new couple.

Our dining hall has outdoor patio seating along the outside of the building. We also have an outdoor space in front of the hall that is perfect for cocktail hour.

If you want to have an indoor reception and outdoor wedding, we can do that! Our team can walk you through the options and recommendations.

Parking There will be plenty of accessible parking in our private parking lot located onsite. All parking is free for guests.

== Grindstone Lake ==
Osprey Wilds is located on the eastern shore of pristine Grindstone Lake in Pine County (about 5 miles west of Sandstone, MN). One of the more unusual lakes in Minnesota, it is a long, narrow, incredibly deep, spring-fed lake, one of the few in the lower half of the state. It has several deep holes that exceed 100 feet; the deepest is 153 feet. At 528 acres, this large freshwater lake is roughly oval shaped, being approximately 2 miles in length north to south and 0.5 miles east to west.

Grindstone Lake is considered the headwater for the Grindstone River. The lake’s name is a translation from the Ojibwe zhiigwanaabikokaa-zaaga’igan (lake abundant with grind stones). Sandstone taken from near the lake was used to make sharpening stones.

Considered an oligotrophic lake, Grindstone has enough oxygen in its deep cold waters to support coldwater species such as trout as well as cool and warmwater species such as bass, panfish, and northern pike. There is a public access is located on an inlet on the north side of the lake.

== More Info ==
Located about 5 miles (8.0 km) west of Sandstone, the Osprey Wilds ELC provides environmental education about the various renewable energy systems that it uses, including geothermal heating and cooling (ground source heat pumps), wind generators, and grid-connected solar arrays. The 535-acre (2.17 km^{2}) ELC includes over 7 miles (11 km) of hiking and cross-country ski trails through a variety of habitats, such as old-growth red and white pines, hardwood forests, restored wetlands and prairies.

On December 30, 2021, Osprey Wilds completed the acquisition of the Blacklock Nature Sanctuary in Moose Lake, MN, located 30 miles north of the main Sandstone campus. The Blacklock property was a gift of 414 acres by Craig and Honey Blacklock. The purchase of additional property adjoining the sanctuary east of Moose Lake added another 148 acres to the acquisition. Both the Sandstone and Moose Lake (Blacklock) campuses include property that is protected by conservation easements through the Minnesota Land Trust.
