= Arden Hills, Minnesota =

City in Minnesota, United States

- City
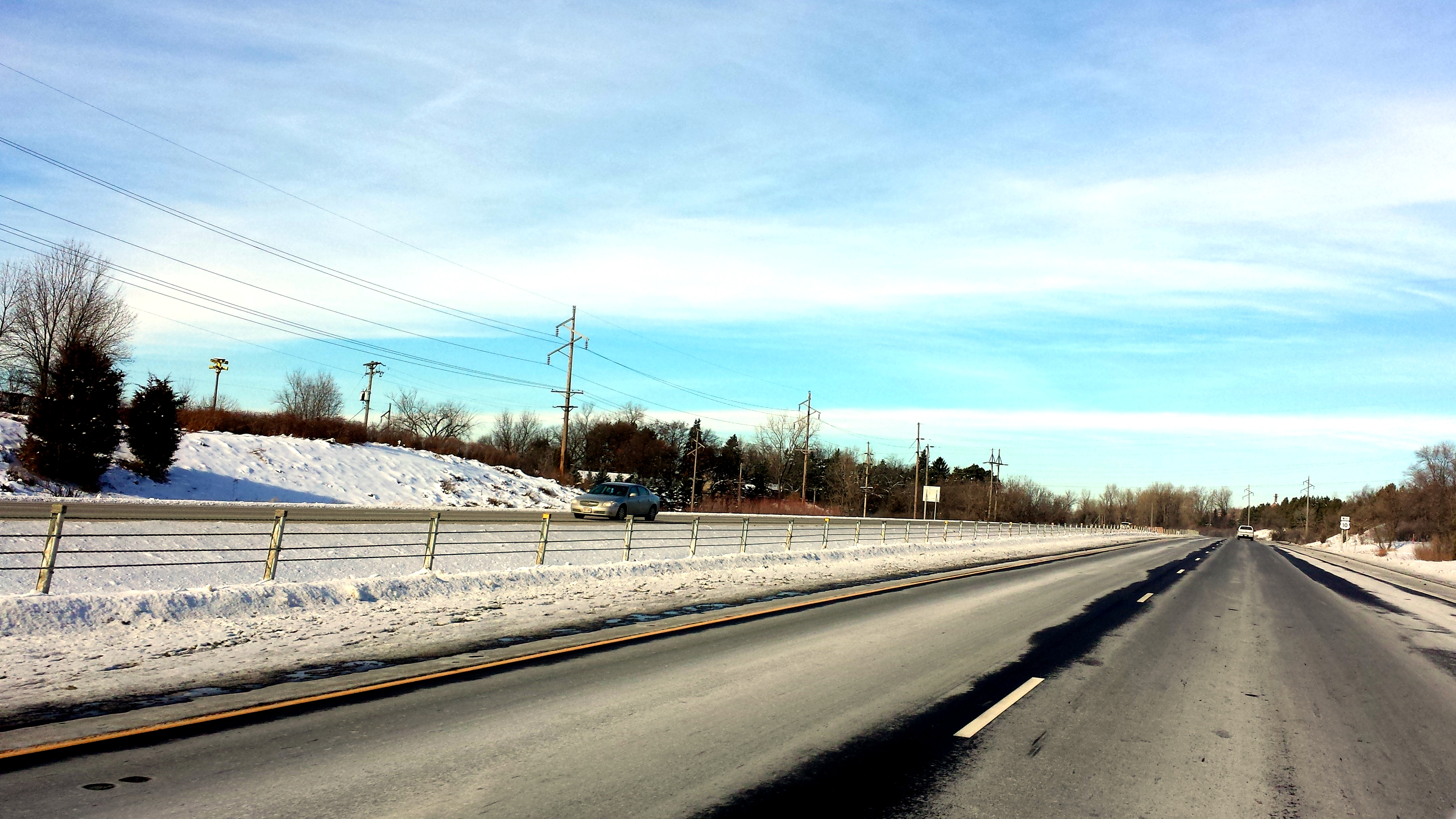
- U.S. Route 10 in Arden Hills

- Logo
- Interactive map of Arden Hills, Minnesota
- Location within Minnesota Location within the United States
- Coordinates: 45.071159°N 93.165472°W
- Country: United States
- State: Minnesota
- County: Ramsey
- Incorporated: February 14, 1951

Government
  - Type: Mayor–Council
  - Mayor: David Grant
  - Councilmembers: Brenda Holden; Kurt Weber; Tena Monson; Emily Rousseau

Area
  - Total: 9.600 sq mi (24.864 km^{2})
  - Land: 8.465 sq mi (21.924 km^{2})
  - Water: 1.135 sq mi (2.939 km^{2}) 11.82%
- Elevation: 915 ft (279 m)

Population (2020)
  - Total: 9,939
  - Estimate (2024): 9,490
  - Density: 1,174/sq mi (453.3/km^{2})
- Time zone: UTC–6 (Central)
  - Summer (DST): UTC–5 (CDT)
- ZIP Code: 55112
- Area code: 651
- FIPS code: 27-02026
- GNIS feature ID: 2393979
- Website: www.cityofardenhills.org

Arden Hills (/ˈɑːrdən/ AR-dən) is a city in Ramsey County, Minnesota, United States. The population was 9,939 at the 2020 census, and was estimated at 9,490 in 2024. Bethel University and its seminary are in the city, and the campus of University of Northwestern – St. Paul straddles the Arden Hills–Roseville border. The city contains the headquarters of Land O'Lakes and Catholic United Financial, a fraternal benefit society. Boston Scientific also has a campus in Arden Hills.

== Geography ==
According to the United States Census Bureau, the city has an area of 9.600 square miles (24.86 km^{2}), of which 8.465 square miles (21.92 km^{2}) is land and 1.135 square miles (2.94 km^{2}) (11.82%) is water.

Interstate Highway 35W, Interstate Highway 694, U.S. Highway 10, Minnesota Highway 51/Snelling Avenue, and County Highway 96 are some of the main routes in the city.

== Demographics ==
Historical population
Census	Pop.	Note	%±
1960	3,930		—
1970	5,149		31.0%
1980	8,012		55.6%
1990	9,199		14.8%
2000	9,652		4.9%
2010	9,552		−1.0%
2020	9,939		4.1%
2024 (est.)	9,490		−4.5%
U.S. Decennial Census; 2020 Census

According to realtor website Zillow, the average price of an Arden Hills home as of December 31, 2025, is $459,559.

As of the 2024 American Community Survey, there are 2,856 estimated households in Arden Hills with an average of 2.75 persons per household. The city has a median household income of $134,118. About 4.7% of the city's population lives at or below the poverty line. Arden Hills has an estimated 58.9% employment rate, with 62.4% of the population holding a bachelor's degree or higher and 96.8% holding a high school diploma. There were 2,962 housing units at an average density of 349.91 per square mile (135.1/km^{2}).

The top five reported languages (people were allowed to report up to two languages, thus the figures will generally add to more than 100%) were English (89.3%), Spanish (4.9%), Indo-European (0.9%), Asian and Pacific Islander (3.9%), and Other (1.0%).

The median age in the city was 35.3 years.

=== Racial and ethnic composition ===
Arden Hills, Minnesota – racial and ethnic composition Note: the US Census treats Hispanic/Latino as an ethnic category. This table excludes Latinos from the racial categories and assigns them to a separate category. Hispanics/Latinos may be of any race.
Race / ethnicity (NH = non-Hispanic)
Race / ethnicity (NH = non-Hispanic)	Population 1990		Population 2000		Population 2010		Population 2020	
Race / ethnicity (NH = non-Hispanic)	Number	Percent	Number	Percent	Number	Percent	Number	Percent
White alone (NH)	8,708	94.66%	8,892	92.13%	8,475	88.72%	7,926	79.75%
Black or African American alone (NH)	102	1.11%	124	1.28%	154	1.61%	219	2.20%
Native American or Alaska Native alone (NH)	9	0.10%	19	0.20%	21	0.22%	11	0.11%
Asian alone (NH)	306	3.33%	351	3.64%	464	4.86%	621	6.25%
Pacific Islander alone (NH)	—	—	1	0.01%	0	0.00%	4	0.04%
Other race alone (NH)	0	0.00%	10	0.10%	11	0.12%	38	0.38%
Mixed race or multiracial (NH)	—	—	124	1.28%	164	1.72%	431	4.34%
Hispanic or Latino (any race)	74	0.80%	131	1.36%	263	2.75%	689	6.93%
Total	9,199	100.00%	9,652	100.00%	9,552	100.00%	9,939	100.00%

=== 2020 census ===
As of the 2020 census, there were 9,939 people, 3,114 households, and 2,283 families residing in the city. The population density was 1,174.27 inhabitants per square mile (453.4/km^{2}). There were 3,235 housing units at an average density of 382.21 per square mile (147.6/km^{2}).

The median age was 35.7 years. 20.3% of residents were under the age of 18 and 19.5% of residents were 65 years of age or older. For every 100 females, there were 90.3 males, and for every 100 females age 18 and over there were 84.6 males age 18 and over.

100.0% of residents lived in urban areas, while 0.0% lived in rural areas.

There were 3,114 households, of which 33.1% had children under the age of 18 living in them. Of all households, 61.0% were married-couple households, 12.6% were households with a male householder and no spouse or partner present, and 22.0% were households with a female householder and no spouse or partner present. About 21.7% of all households were made up of individuals, and 14.0% had someone living alone who was 65 years of age or older.

There were 3,235 housing units, of which 3.7% were vacant. The homeowner vacancy rate was 0.8% and the rental vacancy rate was 4.9%.

=== 2010 census ===
As of the 2010 census, there were 9,552 people, 2,957 households, and 2,019 families residing in the city. The population density was 1,111.73 inhabitants per square mile (429.2/km^{2}). There were 3,053 housing units at an average density of 355.33 per square mile (137.2/km^{2}). The racial makeup of the city was 90.35% White, 1.66% African American, 0.24% Native American, 4.90% Asian, 0.00% Pacific Islander, 0.95% from some other races and 1.89% from two or more races. Hispanic or Latino people of any race were 2.75% of the population.

There were 2,957 households, of which 26.7% had children under the age of 18 living with them, 57.6% were married couples living together, 7.4% had a female householder with no husband present, 3.2% had a male householder with no wife present, and 31.7% were non-families. 26.5% of all households were made up of individuals, and 13.7% had someone living alone who was 65 years of age or older. The average household size was 2.45 and the average family size was 2.95.

The median age in the city was 34.8 years. 16.1% of residents were under the age of 18; 26.1% were between the ages of 18 and 24; 16.1% were from 25 to 44; 26.2% were from 45 to 64; and 15.6% were 65 years of age or older. The gender makeup of the city was 46.9% male and 53.1% female.

=== 2000 census ===
As of the 2000 census, there were 9,652 people, 2,959 households, and 2,228 families residing in the city. The population density was 1,087.3 inhabitants per square mile (419.8/km^{2}). There were 3,017 housing units at an average density of 339.9 per square mile (131.2/km^{2}). The racial makeup of the city was 92.81% White, 1.32% African American, 0.20% Native American, 3.64% Asian, 0.04% Pacific Islander, 0.54% from some other races and 1.46% from two or more races. Hispanic or Latino people of any race were 1.36% of the population.

There were 2,959 households, out of which 33.6% had children under the age of 18 living with them, 63.6% were married couples living together, 8.9% had a female householder with no husband present, and 24.7% were non-families. 19.9% of all households were made up of individuals, and 8.1% had someone living alone who was 65 years of age or older. The average household size was 2.59 and the average family size was 2.98.

In the city, the population was spread out, with 20.0% under the age of 18, 20.3% from 18 to 24, 20.6% from 25 to 44, 25.2% from 45 to 64, and 13.9% who were 65 years of age or older. The median age was 36 years. For every 100 females, there were 85.3 males. For every 100 females age 18 and over, there were 81.6 males.

The median income for a household in the city was $64,773, and the median income for a family was $72,236. Males had a median income of $52,464 versus $38,906 for females. The per capita income for the city was $29,609. About 1.8% of families and 3.9% of the population were below the poverty line, including 4.4% of those under age 18 and 0.8% of those age 65 or over.

== Education ==
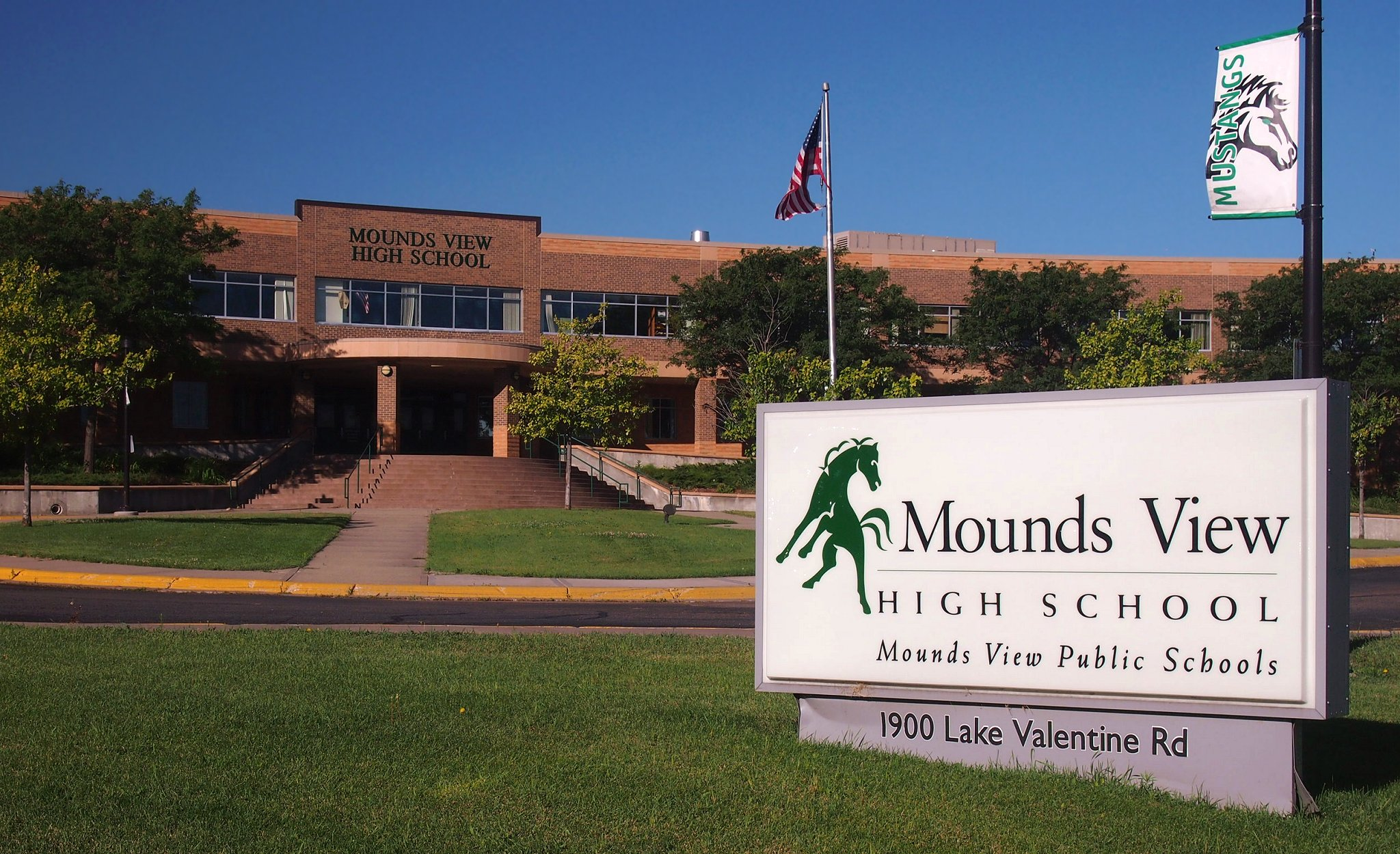
Mounds View High School

The following institutions are in Arden Hills:

- Bethel University
- University of Northwestern – St. Paul (The northern part of the campus is in Arden Hills and the southern part in Roseville.)

Mounds View High School is a public Grade 9–12 school; it is one of two high schools in Mounds View Public Schools ISD 621; the other is Irondale High School in New Brighton.

Valentine Hills is the only elementary school in Arden Hills; it is one of six in ISD 621.

== Government ==
Arden Hills has a city council consisting of four councilmembers and a mayor. As of June 2025, the mayor is David Grant, who was reelected with 51.71% of the vote in 2022. Grant has served as mayor since 2011 and his term ends in December 2026.

Leaders	Names	Assumed office	Current term ends
Mayor	David Grant	2011	December 2026
Councilmember	Brenda Holden	—	December 2028
Councilmember	Kurt Weber	—	December 2028
Councilmember	Tena Monson	—	December 2026
Councilmember	Emily Rousseau	—	December 2026

== Economy ==
The headquarters of Land O'Lakes is in the city.

=== Top employers ===
According to the city's 2024 Annual Comprehensive Financial Report, the largest employers in the city are:

#	Employer	Employees
1	Boston Scientific	3,000 to 3,500
2	Land O'Lakes Inc.	1,250 to 1,750
3	University of Northwestern	1,000 to 1,500
4	Bethel University	750 to 1,250
5	Presbyterian Homes of Arden Hills	450 to 550
6	Delkor	300 to 350
7	Intricon	250 to 300
8	Venture Solutions, Inc.	175 to 225
9	Gradient Financial	150 to 200
10	National Recoveries	150 to 200
11	Ulteig Engineers, Inc.	150 to 200
12	Health Partners Arden Hills Clinic	150 to 200

== Politics ==
Presidential election results

2024 Precinct Results Spreadsheet2020 Precinct Results Spreadsheet2016 Precinct Results Spreadsheet2012 Precinct Results Spreadsheet2008 Precinct Results Spreadsheet2004 Precinct Results Spreadsheet2000 Precinct Results Spreadsheet1996 Precinct Results1992 Precinct Results1988 Precinct Results1984 Precinct Results1980 Precinct Results1976 Precinct Results1972 Precinct Results1968 Precinct Results1964 Precinct Results1960 Precinct Results
Year	Republican	Democratic	Third parties
2024	_% _	_% _	_% _
2020	32.9% 1,828	64.3% 3,577	2.8% 158
2016	36.9% 2,090	51.5% 2,916	11.6% 655
2012	49.2% 2,841	48.2% 2,784	2.6% 150
2008	52.6% 2,154	45.6% 1,866	1.8% 75
2004	53.1% 3,128	45.6% 2,683	1.3% 75
2000	55.8% 3,210	38.3% 2,204	5.9% 343
1996	50.0% 2,565	41.8% 2,143	8.2% 419
1992	44.0% 2,396	34.8% 1,894	21.2% 1,160
1988	60.2% 3,163	39.8% 2,087	0.0% 0
1984	61.9% 2,642	38.1% 1,627	0.0% 0
1980	49.6% 2,128	36.5% 1,566	13.9% 600
1976	56.5% 1,977	41.3% 1,445	2.2% 76
1972	_% _	_% _	_% _
1968	52.4% 1,120	45.0% 963	2.6% 56
1964	49.0% 882	50.9% 916	0.1% 3
1960	58.1% 1,009	41.9% 729	0.0% 0

== Sports ==
The Twins Cities Titans of the NEFL, a semi-pro football team, play in Arden Hills.

== New Minnesota Stadium ==
Ramsey County officials announced in May 2011 that they had reached an agreement with the Minnesota Vikings to be the team's local partner for a new stadium. The site of the stadium would be the former Twins Cities Army Ammunitions Plant in Arden Hills, about 10 miles from the Metrodome in Minneapolis. The agreement called for an $884 million stadium and an additional $173 million for on-site infrastructure, parking and environmental costs.

Ramsey County said the Vikings would commit $407 million to the project, which was about 44% of the stadium cost and 39% of the overall cost. The county's cost would have been $350 million, financed by a half-cent sales tax increase. The remaining $300 million would be paid by Minnesota taxpayers.

Governor Mark Dayton said fixing the roads near the location would likely cost between $175 and 240 million.

This plan fell through on March 1, 2012, when Governor Dayton announced the stadium would be built on the site of their former home, the Metrodome.
