= Ryan Searle (baseball) =

Australian baseball player (born 1989)

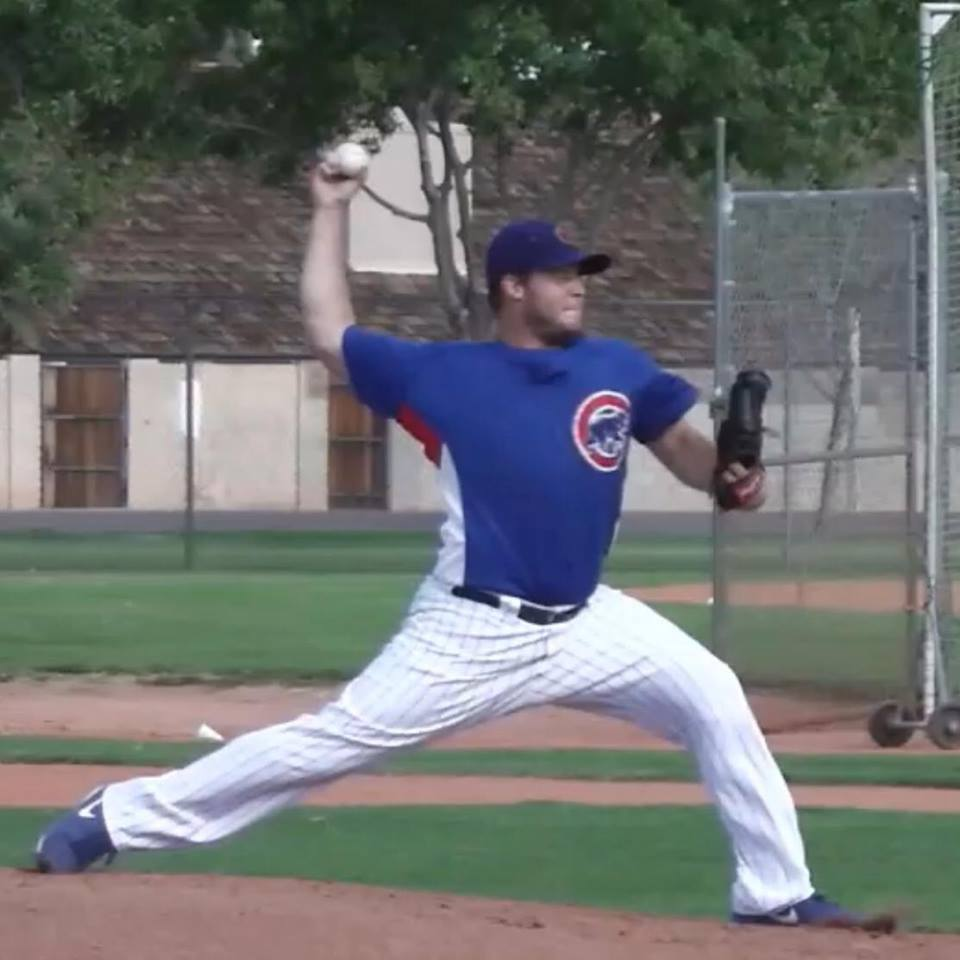
- Ryan Searle pitching in 2013
- Pitcher
- Born: 22 June 1989 (age 37); Brisbane, Queensland, Australia
- Bats: Right Throws: Right

CPBL debut
- March 19, 2016, for the Lamigo Monkeys

CPBL statistics (through 2016 season)
- Win–loss record: 4–5
- Earned run average: 6.38
- Strikeouts: 55
- Stats at Baseball Reference

Teams
- Lamigo Monkeys (2016)

Ryan Searle (born 22 June 1989) is an Australian former professional baseball pitcher. He has previously played in the Chinese Professional Baseball League (CPBL) for the Lamigo Monkeys.

Searle is a regular on the Australia national baseball team, the "Southern Thunder". He has been both a starter and a relief pitcher throughout his career which reached its highest level at Triple-A Iowa Cubs in 2012. Most notably recently, Searle broke the saves (17) and ERA (0.40) record in the newly formed ABL while pitching as the closer for the eventual 2015/2016 ABL Champion Brisbane Bandits.

== Early life ==
Born in Brisbane, he started playing baseball at the age of 5. Continuing to play throughout his schooling years, he graduated from Northpine Christian College at the end of 2006 while playing for the Narangba Demons baseball team. When he grew older he joined Windsor Royals baseball club.

== Professional career ==
=== Chicago Cubs ===
He was signed to a professional baseball contract at the age of 17 with the Chicago Cubs in 2007.

In 2007. Searle spent the first three months of his pro career in spring training and extended spring in Mesa Arizona, then going back to the Australian Academy on the Gold Coast in Australia. In 2008, Searle went to spring training and extended spring to return to the Australian Academy (MLBAAP) again. There he led the starting pitchers in ERA, WHIP, strike outs, wins and innings pitched. He then returned to Mesa, Arizona after the MLBAAP to pitch two games before being promoted to the Boise Hawks, Chicago' Single-A affiliate. There he was 2–2 with a 1.05 ERA in 35+ innings, holding batters to a minuscule .171 against.

In 2009, Searle pitched the entire season with the Daytona Cubs, and was selected as a 2009 Florida State League Mid-Season All-Star at the young age of 19. After a hot start he had a slow second half and his lack of experience started to show.

In 2010, Searle started the year in the FSL but was soon after demoted to Single-A Peoria Chiefs, he was 7–8 with a 4.38 ERA fanning 101 in 124 2/3 innings of work.

In 2011, Searle started out the season pitching out of Daytona's bullpen. After posting a 1.59 ERA in 16 games, he was promoted to the Cubs's Double-A affiliate, the Tennessee Smokies. For the Smokies, Searle logged a 5–3 record with a 3.51 ERA and 66 strikeouts in 23 games. He finished with a combined 3.03 ERA, which lead all Chicago Cubs qualified pitchers.

In 2012 Searle again spent time in the FSL with the Daytona Cubs, but also split time between Double-A Tennessee and also reaching his career/high mark for the first time when he was promoted to the Triple-A Iowa Cubs. He recorded his first and only Triple-A win on 19 August. Searle finished the season with career best mark of eight wins, five losses and a 3.87 ERA over 90+ innings.

2013 was an injury plagued season for Searle, missing almost four months after a forearm sprain. He recovered and went on to make rehabilitation appearances for the rookie-level Arizona League Cubs before being sent to Daytona to finish out the season. There, alongside Cubs first-round draft pick Kris Bryant, Searle and CJ Edwards combined for two two-hit shutouts in the Semi Final clinching game against Dunedin Blue Jays and then in the Championship clinching game against the Charlotte Stone Crabs, where they were crowned the FSL champions for the second time in three years.

In the off season of 2013, Searle was offered a free agent contract to sign back with the Chicago Cubs for the 2014 season. In May 2014, Searle was released from the Cubs organisation following a poor 6.63 ERA season in 19 innings for the Double-A Tennessee Smokies.

=== Grand Prairie AirHogs ===
Searle signed with the Grand Prairie AirHogs following his release from the Cubs and went 5–9 with a 4.39 ERA.

=== Ishikawa Million Stars ===
On 11 March 2015, Searle signed with the Ishikawa Million Stars of Baseball Challenge League. His manager was the age defying player coach, Julio Franco. He was the league's strikeout leader with 113 in 135 innings pitched ending his time with the team with an 8–7 record and a 1.99 ERA.

=== Lamigo Monkeys ===
On 5 February 2016, he signed with the Lamigo Monkeys of Chinese Professional Baseball League. Despite early success Searle, after sustaining a bad knee injury he never regained form and was released from the team on 10 June. After a series of switches between starting and relief roles to become the 3rd foreign player released by the team that year.

=== Unipol Bologna ===
In June 2016, it was announced that Searle would be replacing outgoing Scott Patterson on the Unipol Bologna team playing in the Italian Baseball League. Searle went on to pitch 33 2/3 innings with a 0.53 ERA over the course of the regular season and playoffs, leading his new team to the Italian Baseball League championship.

=== Québec Capitales ===
On 13 March 2018, Searle signed with the Québec Capitales of the Can-Am League. He was released on 26 July.

== Winter League ==
=== Brisbane Bandits ===
In 2010 the newly formed Australian Baseball League kick started its campaign to win over the Australian public. Searle was named to the Brisbane Bandits inaugural roster under head coach MLB All-Star Dave Nilsson. Searle has played an important role for the Brisbane Bandits, pitching in all 6 seasons to date. Leading the team in all time pitching statistical categories such as innings, strike outs, wins.

In the 2015/2016 season, Searle had the most successful campaign of any ABL pitcher to date. Searle led the Bandits to the Claxton Shield, breaking several records along the way. He compiled a career best 5–2 win–loss ratio with an ABL saves record of 17 and ERA record of 0.40 winning the MVP honors for the Brisbane Bandits.

=== Tiburones de La Guaira ===
After the conclusion of his successful finish to his 2016 summer campaign, Searle was offered a contract to play winterball in the Venezuelan Professional Baseball League for the Tiburones de La Guaira club under manager World Series winning manager Ozzie Guillén.

== Australian National Team ==
Searle was first named to the WBC provisional roster in 2009.

In 2011, His efforts were rewarded with selection in the Australian national baseball team for the 2011 Baseball World Cup where he got his first start against Nicaragua, throwing five innings for one earned run and being the pitcher of record in a 4–3 win. In his second start, Searle dominated Canada with an impressive 7 1/3 innings of work for only 3 hits in a 7–0 win for Australia, bringing his record in the cup to 2–0 with a 0.74 ERA.

In 2013, Searle was named to the WBC roster making only 1 start in an eventual loss to Korea. Searle gave up 3 runs in 3 innings.

In 2014, Searle was brought back from Spring Training with the Chicago Cubs to play in an Exhibition game as a precursor to the MLB Opening Series in Sydney. Searle was tabbed as the game 1 starter against the Los Angeles Dodgers. Searle pitched 3 innings only giving up 1 hit 0 runs while striking out 5. Australia went on to lose the game after a Yasiel Puig home run. Australia then won the game against the Arizona Diamondbacks where fellow Australian Ryan Rowland-Smith was playing.

In 2016, Searle was again named to the WBC roster for the Qualifying event based in Sydney. Australia were the eventual winners of the tournament, securing their place in the 2017 WBC. Searle was used as the Closer for team Australia during this tournament.

Searle has also been named to several of the ABL All-Star sides, representing team Australia. He has started the All-Star game but most recently got the win in a walk off thriller against the World All-Stars after pitching a scoreless 9th inning.

In 2018, he was selected exhibition series against Japan.

On 8 October 2019, he was selected at the 2019 WBSC Premier12.

== Awards and highlights ==
- All time ABL saves leader (40)
- FSL Mid Season All-Star
- FSL Pitcher of the week
- FSL 2011 and 2013 Champion
- 2012–2016 ABL All-Star
- Starting Pitcher against LA Dodgers (3IP, 1H, 5K)
- ABL Strike Out Leader 2014/2015
- BCL Strike Out Leader 2015 (111 with a 1.99 ERA)
- Single Season ABL Saves record holder ABL (17)
- Single Season ABL ERA record holder ABL (0.40)
- Single Season ABL WHIP record holder ABL (0.78)
- Single Season ABL Strike out record by a relief pitcher (54)
- Single Season ABL Games pitched record (31)
- Single Season ABL games finished record (30)
- Brisbane Bandits all-time leader in games, innings, wins, strike outs
- 3rd all time in ABL innings (341 1/3)
- 2nd all time in ABL Strike outs (375)
- 4th all time ABL wins (Tied with 24)
- 4x Australian Baseball league Champion (2015/2019 Brisbane Bandits)
- Brisbane Bandits MVP 2015/2016
- Italian Baseball League Champion (2016)
