= List of people from Duluth, Minnesota =

The following list includes notable people, past and present, who were born or have lived in Duluth, Minnesota, the second-largest city (and largest U.S. city) on the shores of Lake Superior.

== Business and industry ==
- W. T. Bailey (1842–1914), 19th- and 20th-century lumber tycoon who kept his headquarters in Duluth
- Bob Chinn (1923–2022), owner of Bob Chinn's Crab House, highest-grossing restaurant in America in 2012
- Thomas F. Cole (1862–1939), mining executive; president of Oliver Iron Mining after its merger with U.S. Steel
- Chester Adgate Congdon (1853–1916), attorney and investor
- Andy Goldfine, founder of Aerostich; creator of the Roadcrafter motorcycle protective suit
- Klapmeier brothers, founders of Cirrus; pioneered the use of composites, glass cockpits and ballistic parachutes for production aircraft; inducted into National Aviation Hall of Fame (2014), kept their headquarters in Duluth
- Merritt brothers, also known as the Seven Iron Brothers of Duluth; discovered iron ore in 1890 on the Mesabi Iron Range
- David Oreck (1923–2023), entrepreneur and lecturer
- Jeno Paulucci (1918–2011), entrepreneur, philanthropist and food industry magnate; founder of Chun King, Jeno's Inc., and Bellisio Foods; creator of the pizza roll, born and raised on the Iron Range though resided in Duluth

== Entertainment ==
- Dale Arnold, sportscaster for WEEI-FM and NESN
- Dorothy Arnold, actress; first wife of baseball player Joe DiMaggio
- Maria Bamford, comedian and television actress; American Comedy Award for Best Club Comic (2014)
- Odin Biron, actor
- Mitch Clem, cartoonist
- Marguerite De La Motte, silent movie actress
- Carol Dempster, silent movie actress
- Otis Dozovic, professional wrestler for World Wrestling Entertainment
- Daniel Durant, stage and film actor
- Jane Frazee, actress
- Peggy Knudsen, actress
- Don LaFontaine (1940–2008), prolific voice-over actor of film and video-game trailers, television advertisements, and network promotions; born and raised in Duluth
- Jessica Lange, photographer and Academy, Emmy, Tony, SAG and Golden Globe Award-winning actress; tied as the sixth most Oscar-nominated actress in history, born in Cloquet and resided in Duluth
- Verne Lundquist, CBS sportscaster
- Chris Monroe, cartoonist and children's book illustrator
- Edna Munsey, stage and silent film actress
- Lorenzo Music, voice actor, raised in Duluth
- Gena Lee Nolin, actress
- Charles Nolte (1923–2010), actor and director, born in Duluth
- Jim Ojala, special effects and makeup artist, screenwriter and director
- Dennis Shryack, screenwriter

== Music ==
- Jordan Schmidt, Grammy nominated Songwriter and Producer
- Bill Berry, drummer for the band R.E.M.
- Haley Bonar, folk music singer and songwriter
- David Dondero, indie-folk musician
- Bob Dylan, iconic Grammy- and Academy Award–winning folk singer and songwriter; spearheaded the American folk music revival in mid-1960s; inducted into Rock and Roll Hall of Fame (1988); Nobel Prize in Literature (2016), born in Duluth
- Sadik Hakim, jazz pianist, played on Charlie Parker's famous "Ko-Ko" session
- Dan Murphy, Soul Asylum band member and founder
- Charlie Parr, folk musician
- Rivulets, slowcore band, founder Nathan Amundson originates from Duluth
- Alice Sjoselius (1888–1982), concert singer, voice teacher
- Phil Solem, musician
- Alan Sparhawk and Mimi Parker (Parker, 1967–2022), spouses and founding members of the indie rock and slowcore band Low
- Trampled by Turtles, bluegrass band, hails from Duluth and refers to the city in several songs

== Politics and law ==
- Salisbury Adams (1925–2004), Minnesota state legislator and lawyer
- John Antila (1902–1969), Minnesota state legislator and businessman
- Melvin Baldwin, U.S. representative
- William W. Billson, Minnesota state senator and lawyer
- Gordon H. Butler, Minnesota state senator
- Chester Adgate Congdon (1853–1916), lawyer and capitalist
- Albert J. Connors, Wisconsin state senator
- Harold J. Dahl (1930–1989), Minnesota state legislator and judge
- Richard E. Ferrario (1931–1985), Minnesota state senator and educator
- Alfred E. France, Minnesota state representative and businessman
- Ben E. Gustafson, Minnesota state legislator and businessman
- Earl B. Gustafson, Minnesota state legislator, judge, and lawyer
- James Gustafson, Minnesota state senator and businessman
- Richard H. Hanson (1931–2023), Minnesota state legislator
- Gerald Heaney (1918–2010), United States circuit judge
- Liish Kozlowski (born 1988), member of the Minnesota House of Representatives
- Arlene Ione Lehto, Minnesota state legislator and businesswoman
- Charles Lundy Lewis, Minnesota Supreme Court justice
- Edwin L. MacLean (1890–1968), Minnesota state legislator
- Robert Mahoney, Michigan state legislator
- Sidney Redding Mason, Minnesota state legislator and businessman
- Henry Louis Morin, Minnesota state senator, farmer, and laborunion activist
- Page Morris (1853–1924), United States representative (1897–1903) and United States district judge (1903–1924)
- Thomas Francis O'Malley (1889–1954), Minnesota state legislator and railroad conductor
- Richard F. Palmer, Minnesota state legislator and newspaper editor
- Samuel F. Snively, mayor of Duluth 1921–1937; pushed for the creation of numerous parks and boulevards throughout the city; longest running Mayor in Duluth's history
- Pete Stauber, U.S. representative (2019–present)
- Ozora P. Stearns, lawyer and U.S. senator from Minnesota (1871)
- Pat Sullivan, majority leader of the Washington House of Representatives
- Dwight A. Swanstrom, Minnesota state legislator and businessman
- Gordon Voss, Minnesota state legislator
- Shubael F. White (1841–1914), Michigan state senator and judge
- Gerald Willet, Minnesota state legislator and businessman

== Sports ==
- Mason Aguirre, professional snowboarder, competed in 2006 Winter Olympics
- Jim Ahern, professional golfer, played on PGA Tour and Champions Tour
- Greg Anderson, drag racer, Pro Stock NHRA champion
- Herbert Clow, National Football League, 1920s
- Jack Connolly, hockey player, captain of 2011 Minnesota-Duluth men's NCAA championship team; Hobey Baker Award winner (2012), born and raised in Duluth
- Gary DeGrio, professional ice hockey forward
- Dan Devine, captain of UMD football team, later coached the Missouri Tigers, Notre Dame Fighting Irish, and Green Bay Packers; inducted into College Football Hall of Fame (1985)
- Ethan Finlay, soccer player
- Derek Forbort, hockey player for the Vancouver Canucks
- Dates Fryberger, hockey player in 1964 Winter Olympics
- Kara Goucher, distance runner, world championships silver medalist, 2008 and 2012 Olympian
- C. J. Ham, fullback for Minnesota Vikings
- Phil Hoene, hockey player, native Duluthian, played for UMD and Los Angeles Kings
- Bill Irwin, professional wrestler, known in WWE as "The Goon"
- Gianna Kneepkens, WNBA basketball player
- Lenny Lane, professional wrestler
- Drew LeBlanc, hockey player; Hobey Baker Award winner (2013)
- Jim McNally, Olympic sport shooter
- Russ Method, football player
- Bill O'Toole, football player
- Neal Pionk, hockey player for the Winnipeg Jets
- Chris Plys, curler, 2010 Winter Olympic team
- Joe Polo, curler, 2006 Winter Olympic team
- Rick Rickert, basketball player, University of Minnesota and New Zealand Breakers
- Barbara Rotvig, AAGPBL player
- John Shuster, Olympic curling medalist
- Whitey Skoog, basketball player, University of Minnesota and Minneapolis Lakers
- Gordy Soltau, NFL player for San Francisco 49ers
- Jamie Trachsel, head softball coach at Ole Miss; former head coach at Minnesota, Iowa State and North Dakota State
- Katie Vesterstein, skier
- Darren Ward, Olympic swimmer
- Butch Williams, NHL player
- Tom Williams (1940–1992), NHL player, 1960 Winter Olympics gold medalist
- David Krmpotich, silver medalist in the 1988 Olympics in rowing (men's coxless fours)

== Writers and journalists ==
- Margaret Culkin Banning, best-selling author of 36 novels; early women's rights advocate
- Carol Bly, author
- Irving Copi, philosopher, logician and textbook author
- Marty Essen, author, photographer, professional speaker
- Roger Grimsby, journalist, television news anchor and actor
- David Hagberg, author of international thrillers
- Steve Hagen, Zen author and priest
- Dean Hoff, Scottish historian, folklorist, writer, and director
- Louis Jenkins, author and poet
- Sinclair Lewis (1885–1951), author and Nobel laureate, wrote the novel Cass Timberlane while a resident of Duluth
- John L. Morrison, newspaper publisher
- Lauran Paine (1916–2001), author
- John R. Reed, academic and writer
- Rick Shefchik, author, historian and journalist

== Others ==
- Scott D. Anderson (1965–1999), author and pilot; successfully flew all in-flight test-deployments of the Cirrus Airframe Parachute System; inducted into Minnesota Aviation Hall of Fame (2010), raised in Duluth
- Mike Colalillo (1925–2011), Medal of Honor recipient (US Army, World War II)
- Henry A. Courtney Jr. (1916–1945), posthumous Medal of Honor recipient (US Marine Corps, World War II)
- John H. Darling, engineer and astronomer
- Robert R. Gilruth (1913–2000), first director of NASA's Manned Spacecraft Center; served during programs Mercury, Gemini and Apollo; inducted into National Aviation Hall of Fame (1994), raised in Duluth
- Robert Isabell (1952–2009), event planner
- Kay Kurt, painter
- John R. Lampe (1935–2024), historian
- Tony LeVier (1913–1999), air racer and test pilot for the Lockheed Corporation; inducted into National Aviation Hall of Fame (1978), born in Duluth
- Nika Nesgoda, conceptual artist and photographer
- William P. Levine, U.S. Army major general and Holocaust speaker
- Janet McCarter Woolley (1906–1996), tuberculosis researcher
- Ellen Pence, scholar and social activist, created Duluth Model of intervention in domestic violence
- Frederick Emil Resche (1866–1946), U.S. Army brigadier general
- Erik Sommer, artist
- Sarah Burger Stearns, first president of the Minnesota Woman Suffrage Association
- Gloria Tew (1923–2022), abstract sculptor
- Oliver G. Traphagen (1854–1932), architect
- Albert Woolson (1850–1956), last Union civil war soldier to die

== See also ==
- History of Minnesota
- List of people from Minnesota
