= Gustafson =

Scandinavian surname

A derivative of the name Gustav, Gustafson, Gustafsson, Gustavson, or Gustavsson, is a group of surnames of Scandinavian origin, and may refer to the following people:

== Gustafson ==
- Andy Gustafson (1903–1979), American collegiate football coach
- Axel Carl Johan Gustafson (1849–?), Swedish author
- Ben E. Gustafson (born 1954), American politician
- Barry Gustafson (born 1938), New Zealand political scientist and historian
- Björn Gustafson (born 1934), Swedish actor
- Bob Gustafson (1920–2001), American cartoonist
- Cliff Gustafson (1931–2023), American baseball coach
- Derek Gustafson (born 1979), American hockey goaltender
- Dwight Gustafson (1930–2014), American composer and conductor
- Earl B. Gustafson (1927–2018), American politician, judge, and lawyer
- Fredrik Gustafson (born 1976), Swedish football player
- Gabriel Gustafson (1853–1915), Swedish archaeologist
- Gerald Gustafson (1928–2024), U.S. Air Force pilot
- James Gustafson (1925–2021), American theological ethicist
- James Gustafson (politician) (1938–2014), American politician
- John Gustafson (1942–2014), English rock bassist
- John L. Gustafson (born 1955), American computer scientist
- Kathryn Gustafson (born 1951), American architect
- Lenard Gustafson (1933–2022), Canadian Senator
- Megan Gustafson (born 1996), American basketball player
- Nancy Gustafson (born 1956), American opera singer
- Ralph Barker Gustafson (1909–1995), Canadian poet
- Ruth Gustafson (1881–1960), Swedish social democrat
- Sophie Gustafson (born 1973), Swedish professional golfer
- Stan Gustafson (born 1942), American politician
- Steve Gustafson (born 1957), bass guitarist, member of 10,000 Maniacs
- Thane Gustafson (born 1944), American author and political scientist
- Tomas Gustafson (born 1959), aka Sven Thomas Gustafson, Swedish speed-skater
- Wallace Gustafson (1925–2018), American lawyer and politician
- Wylie Gustafson (born 1961), American country music artist

== Gustafsson ==
- Alexander Gustafsson (born 1987), Swedish mixed martial arts fighter
- Anders Gustafsson (1978–1995), Swedish murder victim
- Anders Gustafsson (born 1979), Swedish sprint canoeist
- Andreas Gustafsson (born 1981), Swedish race walker
- Anton Gustafsson (born 1990), Swedish professional ice hockey player
- August Gustafsson (born 1993), Thai footballer
- Billy Gustafsson (1948–2018), Swedish politician and member of Riksdag
- Bo Gustafsson (born 1954), Swedish Olympian
- Bengt Gustafsson (astronomer) (born 1943), Swedish astronomer
- Bengt Gustafsson (general) (1933–2019), Supreme Commander of the Swedish Armed Forces
- Bengt-Åke Gustafsson (born 1958), Swedish hockey player and coach
- Count Axel Gustafsson Oxenstierna (1583–1654), historical Swedish statesman
- David Gustafsson (born 2000), professional ice hockey player
- Dennis Gustafsson (born 1972), professional bandy player
- Eddie Gustafsson (born 1977), Swedish football player
- Einar Gustafsson (1914–1995), Swedish farmer and politician
- Elina Gustafsson (born 1992), Finnish boxer
- Elin Gustafsson (born 1989), Swedish politician
- Erik Gustafsson (musician), bass guitarist, formerly of Therion
- Erik Gustafsson (ice hockey, born 1988), Swedish ice hockey player
- Erik Gustafsson (ice hockey, born 1992), Swedish ice hockey player
- Hans Gustafsson (1923–1998), Swedish politician
- Jan Gustafsson (born 1979), German chess grandmaster
- Jan-Eric Gustafsson (born 1949), Swedish educational psychologist
- Lars Gustafsson (1936–2016), Swedish poet
- Lars-Eric Gustafsson (born 1935), Swedish rower
- Magnus Gustafsson (born 1967), former Swedish professional tennis player
- Mats Gustafsson (born 1964), Swedish saxophonist
- Nils Gustafsson, acquitted Finnish murder suspect
- Pär Gustafsson (born 1983), Swedish politician
- Per Gustafsson (born 1970), professional Swedish hockey player
- Peter Gustafsson (born 1976), Swedish golfer
- Poppy Gustafsson, Baroness Gustafsson (born 1982), British businesswoman and government minister
- Robert Gustafsson (born 1964), Swedish comedian
- Roger Gustafsson (born 1952), Swedish football player
- Simon Gustafsson (born 1990), Swedish speedway rider
- Sofia Gustafsson (born 1990), Swedish curler
- Toini Gustafsson (born 1938), Swedish skier
- Tore Gustafsson (born 1962), Swedish hammer thrower
- Veikka Gustafsson (born 1968), Finnish mountaineer
- Åke Gustafsson (1908–1988), Swedish scientist and poet
- Tomas Antonelius (born 1973), né Gustafsson, former Swedish football player (footballer)
- Ulf Gustafsson (born 1937), Swedish rower
- Greta Garbo (1905–1990), née Gustafsson, legendary Swedish actress

== Gustavson ==
- Don Gustavson (born 1943), American politician and member of the Nevada Senate
- Erik Gustavson (born 1955), Norwegian film director and producer
- Eva Gustavson (1917–2009), aka Eva Gustafson, a Norwegian-American contralto singer
- John Gustavson (1886–1958), Swedish politician
- Linda Gustavson (born 1949), American swimmer and Olympic champion
- Mark Gustavson (born 1959), American composer of contemporary classical music
- Paul Gustavson (1916–1977), American comic-book writer and artist
- Penry Gustavson (born 1970), American politician
- Tamara Gustavson (born 1961), American billionaire heir and horse breeder

== Gustavsson ==
- Arvid Gustavsson, Lord of Vik, medieval Swedish justiciar
- Eva-Lena Gustavsson (born 1956), Swedish politician
- Filip Gustavsson (born 1998), Swedish ice hockey player
- Frida Gustavsson (born 1993), Swedish model
- Gustav Gustavsson, 17th-century count
- Jonas Gustavsson (born 1984), Swedish ice hockey goaltender
- Karl Nicklas Gustavsson, Swedish composer
- Martin Gustavsson (born 1980), Swedish swimmer
- Patrik Gustavsson (born 2001), Thai footballer
- Paul Gustavson (1916–1977), Finnish-American comic book writer
- Tony Gustavsson (born 1973), Swedish football manager

== See also ==
- Gustav IV Adolf, king of Sweden who after his deposition travelled incognito under the name Colonel Gustafsson.
- Gustafson's law, a law of computer engineering
- Gustafsen Lake Standoff, an indigenous land dispute from 1995 in Canada
- A type of disease known as X-linked mental retardation type Gustavson
- Peter B. Gustavson School of Business
- Gustav (disambiguation)
- Gustavsen
- Fargo (film)
