= Swanstrom =

Swanstrom or Swanström is a surname. Notable people with the surname include:

- Arthur Swanstrom (1888-1940), American lyricist
- Dwight A. Swanstrom (1905–1978), American businessman and politician
- Edward Ernest Swanstrom (1903–1985), American Roman Catholic Titular Bishop of Arba, Auxiliary Bishop of New York
- J. Edward Swanstrom (1853–1911), American lawyer and politician from New York
- Jack Swanstrom (born 1961), American educator and film director
- Karin Swanström (1873–1942), Swedish actress, producer and director
