= Gutheim =

Gutheim is a surname. Notable people with the surname include:

- Allan Gutheim (born 1962), Swedish film composer
- Armand Gutheim, Swedish composer
- Frederick Gutheim (1908–1993), American urban planner, historian and architect
- James Koppel Gutheim (1817–1886), Prussian-born American rabbi
- Jeff Gutheim (born 1971), American screenwriter
