= Senator Gustafson =

Senator Gustafson may refer to:

- Earl B. Gustafson (1927–2018), Minnesota State Senate
- Heather Gustafson (fl. 2020s), Minnesota State Senate
- James Gustafson (politician) (1938–2014), Minnesota State Senate
