= Edward Swanstrom =

Edward Swanstrom may refer to:

- Edward Ernest Swanstrom, American Roman Catholic bishop
- J. Edward Swanstrom, American lawyer and politician from New York
