= New Richland, Minnesota =

City in Minnesota, United States

New Richland
- City
- Motto: "History is ours, Future is yours."
- Location of New Richland, Minnesota

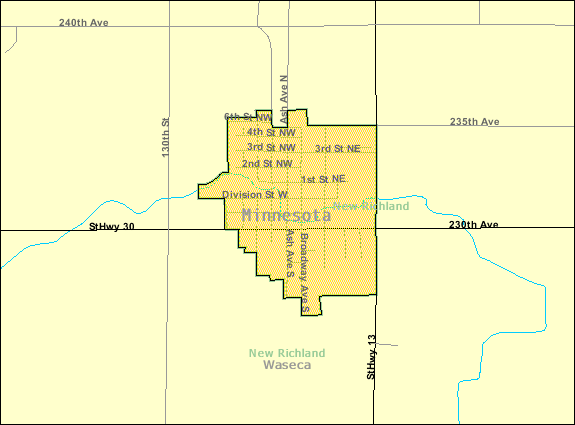
- Detailed map of New Richland, Minnesota
- Coordinates: 43°53′40″N 93°29′40″W
- Country: United States
- State: Minnesota
- County: Waseca

Government
  - Type: Mayor - Council
  - Mayor: Janda Ferguson

Area
  - Total: 0.59 sq mi (1.53 km^{2})
  - Land: 0.59 sq mi (1.53 km^{2})
  - Water: 0 sq mi (0.00 km^{2})
- Elevation: 1,188 ft (362 m)

Population (2020)
  - Total: 1,229
  - Density: 2,079.6/sq mi (802.92/km^{2})
- Time zone: UTC-6 (Central (CST))
  - Summer (DST): UTC-5 (CDT)
- ZIP code: 56072
- Area code: 507
- FIPS code: 27-45862
- GNIS feature ID: 2395213
- Website: City website

New Richland is a city in Waseca County, Minnesota, United States. The city was founded in 1877. As of the 2020 census, New Richland had a population of 1,229.

== History ==
New Richland was platted in 1877, taking its name from New Richland Township, which was named after Richland County, Wisconsin. The city contains one property listed on the National Register of Historic Places, the 1902 New Richland Odd Fellows Hall.

== Geography ==
According to the United States Census Bureau, the city has an area of 0.61 square miles (1.58 km^{2}), all land. Minnesota Highways 13 and 30 are two of the main routes in the city.

== Demographics ==
Historical population
Census	Pop.	Note	%±
1880	304		—
1890	423		39.1%
1900	750		77.3%
1910	685		−8.7%
1920	754		10.1%
1930	777		3.1%
1940	863		11.1%
1950	908		5.2%
1960	1,046		15.2%
1970	1,113		6.4%
1980	1,263		13.5%
1990	1,237		−2.1%
2000	1,197		−3.2%
2010	1,203		0.5%
2020	1,229		2.2%
U.S. Decennial Census

=== 2010 census ===
As of the census of 2010, there were 1,203 people, 487 households, and 297 families living in the city. The population density was 1,972.1 inhabitants per square mile (761.4/km^{2}). There were 531 housing units at an average density of 870.5 per square mile (336.1/km^{2}). The racial makeup of the city was 97.1% White, 1.0% African American, 0.1% Native American, 0.2% Asian, 1.1% from other races, and 0.5% from two or more races. Hispanic or Latino of any race were 3.4% of the population.

There were 487 households, of which 29.0% had children under 18 living with them, 46.8% were married couples living together, 9.2% had a female householder with no husband present, 4.9% had a male householder with no wife present, and 39.0% were non-families. 33.3% of all households were made up of individuals, and 17.9% had someone living alone who was 65 or older. The average household size was 2.35 and the average family size was 3.01.

The median age in the city was 40.9 years. 24.3% of residents were under 18; 7% were between 18 and 24; 22.8% were from 25 to 44; 24.2% were from 45 to 64; and 21.8% were 65 or older. The gender makeup of the city was 49.0% male and 51.0% female.

=== 2000 census ===
As of the census of 2000, there were 1,197 people, 483 households, and 308 families living in the city. The population density was 2,002.8 inhabitants per square mile (773.3/km^{2}). There were 503 housing units at an average density of 841.6 per square mile (324.9/km^{2}). The racial makeup of the city was 99.08% White, 0.08% Asian, 0.33% from other races, and 0.50% from two or more races. Hispanic or Latino of any race were 1.17% of the population.

There were 483 households, of which 28.8% had children under 18 living with them, 50.9% were married couples living together, 9.1% had a female householder with no husband present, and 36.2% were non-families. 33.1% of all households were made up of individuals, and 20.5% had someone living alone who was 65 or older. The average household size was 2.34 and the average family size was 3.01.

In the city, the population was spread out, with 24.6% under 18, 5.8% from 18 to 24, 25.0% from 25 to 44, 18.8% from 45 to 64, and 25.7% who were 65 or older. The median age was 42. For every 100 females, there were 86.2 males. For every 100 females 18 and over, there were 79.0 males.

The median income for a household in the city was $36,406, and the median income for a family was $46,339. Males had a median income of $31,081 versus $22,500 for females. The per capita income was $18,106. About 2.3% of families and 4.7% of the population were below the poverty line, including 5.2% of those under 18 and 6.4% of those 65 or over.

== Notable person ==
- Gerald Gustafson, Air Force Cross awardee

== See also ==
- List of cities in Minnesota
