= Karl Nicklas Gustavsson =

Swedish composer (born 1972)

- Born: 20 April 1972
- Died: 4 March 2021 (aged 48)

Karl Nicklas Gustavsson was a Swedish composer, producer and choir conductor. He was born on April 20, 1972, and studied music theory and composition with Maurice Karkoff, Johan Jeverud, Fredrik Glans and Armand Gutheim before moving to London in 2001 to study composition at the Guildhall School of Music and Drama with Matthew King. He died on 4th March 2021 after a short illness.

His compositions include three symphonies, orchestral works, chamber music, songs, choral works and music for the stage.

== Principal works ==
- Poem no.1 for two pianos
- Duo for two horns
- The Lost Item, miniature opera in one act
- Birdsongs for wind quintet
- Sonatina for violin and piano
- Concertino for guitar, oboe and string orchestra
- Sonatina for horn and piano
