= Takhli Royal Thai Air Force Base =

Takhli Royal Thai Air Force Base
- Part of Royal Thai Air Force (RTAF)
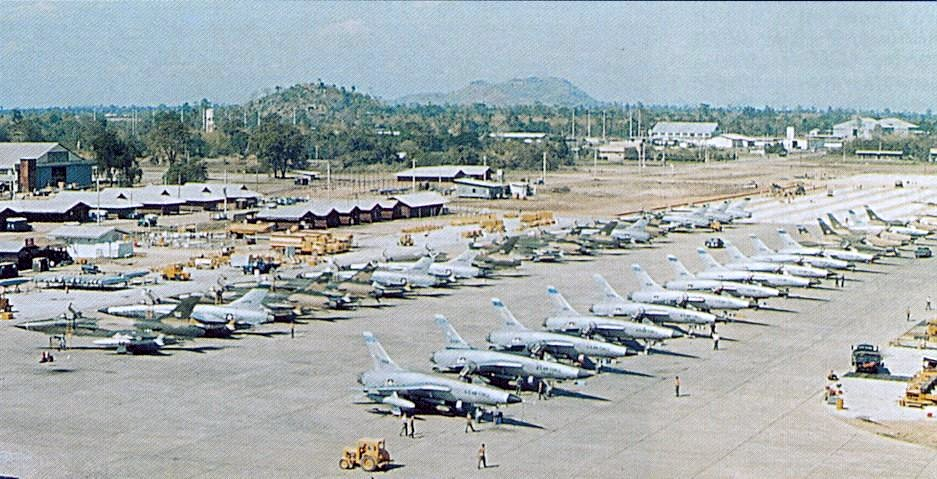
- Takhli Royal Thai Air Force Base in 1965

Site information
- Type: Air Force base
- Owner: Royal Thai Air Force
- Operator: Royal Thai Air Force
- Controlled by: Royal Thai Air Force

Location
- Coordinates: 15°16′05″N 100°17′32″E

Site history
- Built: 1955
- In use: 1955–present
- Battles/wars: Vietnam War

Airfield information
- IATA: TKH; ICAO: VTPI

Summary
- Coordinates: 15°16′05″N 100°17′32″E

Map
- Location of Takhli Royal Thai Air Force Base

Runways
Direction	Length		Surface
Direction	ft	m	Surface
18/36	9,850	3,000	Concrete

Takhli Royal Thai Air Force Base (IATA: TKH, ICAO: VTPI) is a Royal Thai Air Force (RTAF) facility in central Thailand, approximately 144 miles (240 km) northwest of Bangkok in Takhli District, Nakhon Sawan Province.

== Units ==
Takhli is the home of the Royal Thai Air Force Wing 4, 3d Air Division. Squadrons assigned are:

- 401 Light Attack Squadron, flying T-50 TH Golden Eagle
- 402 Reconnaissance Squadron, flying DA 42 MPP
- 403 Fighter Squadron, flying F-16A/B MLU Fighting Falcon
- 302 Unmanned Aerial Vehicle Squadron, flying Aerostar and Dominator UAVs

== History ==
Takhli RTAFB was established in the 1950s. In the late 1950s, the United States Central Intelligence Agency (CIA) used Takhli as operating base for CIA resupply of Tibetan freedom fighters. CIA-operated C-130A Hercules transports flew men and supplies over Indian airspace, with the consent of Prime Minister Nehru, for parachute drops into Communist Chinese-occupied Tibet.

Political considerations with regards to Communist forces engaging in a civil war inside Laos and fears of the civil war spreading into Thailand led the Thai government to allow the United States to covertly use five Thai bases beginning in 1961 for the air defense of Thailand and to fly reconnaissance flights over Laos.

Under Thailand's "gentleman's agreement" with the United States, RTAF bases used by the USAF were commanded by Thai officers. Thai air police controlled access to the bases, along with USAF Security Police, who assisted them in base defense using sentry dogs, observation towers, and machine gun bunkers. All USAF personnel were fully armed after 1965.

The USAF airmen at Takhli were under the command of the United States Pacific Air Forces (PACAF). Takhli was the location for TACAN station Channel 43, and was referenced by that identifier in voice communications during air missions.

The APO for Takhli was APO San Francisco, 96273.

=== United States Advisory Forces ===
The initial squadrons and units deployed to Takhli were placed under the command and control of the Thirteenth Air Force, headquartered at Clark Air Base in the Philippines. Thailand-based aircraft flew missions mostly into Laos until the 1964 Gulf of Tonkin Resolution which expanded the air war into North Vietnam.

In 1962, the U.S. Military Assistance Group in South Vietnam was upgraded to Military Assistance Command, Vietnam (MACV), a promotion which gave it authority to command combat troops. Shortly thereafter, the Military Assistance Command, Thailand (MACT) was set up with a similar level of authority in order to aid Thailand in resisting communist aggression and subversion.

The USAF component of the U.S. Pacific Command was PACAF. Seventh Air Force, another Numbered Air Force of PACAF was headquartered at Tan Son Nhut Air Base, South Vietnam, although the Seventh controlled many units based in Thailand. Thai sensitivities about units based in Thailand reporting to a headquarters in South Vietnam caused a shift whereby the Seventh Air Force was ostensibly subordinate to Thirteenth Air Force for administrative matters (and therefore referred to as Seventh/Thirteenth Air Force). The commander, Seventh Air Force, played a dual role as MACV's deputy for air operations.

In July 1962, the 6011th Air Base Squadron was organized, the first "host" unit at Takhli RTAFB.

==== F-100 Super Sabre deployments ====
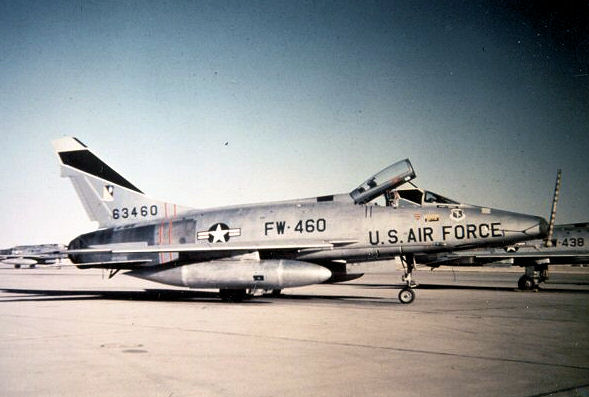
F-100D of the 523d Tactical Fighter Squadron

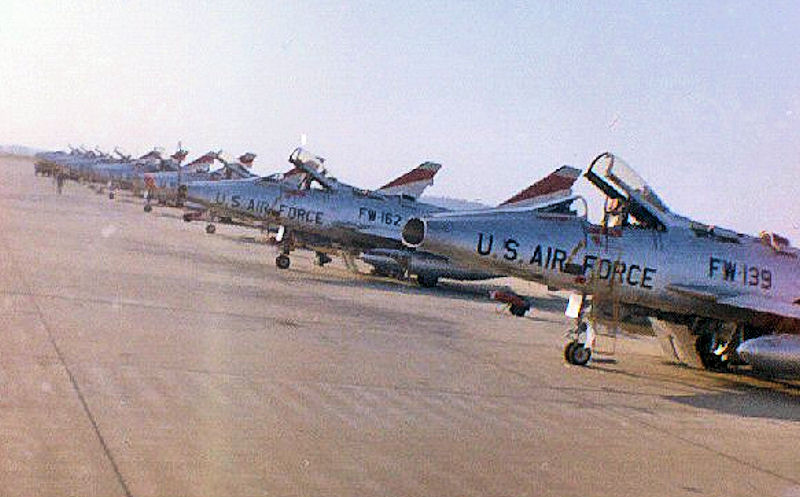
522d Tactical Fighter Squadron F-100DS at Takhli, 1963

The first USAF personnel began arriving at Takhli RTAFB on 10 February 1961 when the 27th Tactical Fighter Wing (TFW) from Cannon AFB, New Mexico began deploying F-100D Super Sabres to the base to attack the Pathet Lao who were overrunning most of northwestern Laos. At Takhli, base support for the rotating Tactical Air Command (TAC) F-100 squadrons was provided by the 6011th ABS. In an organizational change, the 331st Air Base Squadron replaced the 6011th ABS at Takhli in July 1963 as the host unit at Takhli. The 331st ABS came under the command and control of 35th Tactical Group at Don Muang Royal Thai Air Force Base, near Bangkok.

The 27th TFW kept a rotational Temporary duty assignment (TDY) of three squadrons of F-100s in Takhli until November 1965 when F-105 Thunderchiefs began to arrive on a permanent basis. During February 1963, the rotational squadrons of F-100s from Cannon was reduced to six aircraft, with the deployments from Cannon ending in March 1964 and the squadrons deploying instead to Da Nang Air Base in South Vietnam.

In response to the Gulf of Tonkin Incident 10 F-100s from the 510th Tactical Fighter Squadron of the 405th Fighter Wing at Clark Air Base were deployed to Takhli. The first recorded combat loss was an F-100D (56–3085), shot down on 18 August 1964 over Laos. The Clark F-100s remained at Takhli until 20 August 1965 on a rotating basis.

F-100 Super Sabre squadrons deployed to Takhli were:

- 522d Tactical Fighter Squadron (27th TFW)

Deployed: 13 February-c. 7 March 1961; 5 February-15 June 1962; 12 December 1962-c. 15 February 1963; 16 March-6 May 1964; 8 August-15 November 1964; 15 August-25 November 1965

- 523d Tactical Fighter Squadron (27th TFW)

Deployed: 5 September-20 November 1961; 12 October 1962-c. 15 January 1963; 17 September-20 November 1963; 12 June-4 September 1964; 22 March-30 June 1965

- 524th Tactical Fighter Squadron (27th TFW)

Deployed: 10 February-16 June 1961; 30 October-14 November 1961; 9 June-c. 27 June 1963; 21 January-19 March 1964; 1 December 1964 – 28 March 1965

- 510th Tactical Fighter Squadron (405th TFW)

Deployed: 11 May – 8 June 1962

In November 1965 the last rotating F-100 squadron departed Takhli, to be replaced by the F-105D Thunderchief.

==== F-105 Thunderchief deployments ====
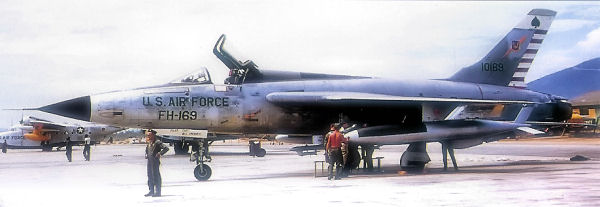
F-105D of the 563d TFS, 1965

In May 1964 Takhli became a forward deployment base for rotational F-105 Thunderchief squadrons. The 35th Tactical Fighter Squadron was deployed to Takhli from Yokota AB, between May 1964 – June 1964 and between 26 August–28 October 1965. The 80th Tactical Fighter Squadron, deployed to Takhli between 26 June–26 August 1965 from the 6441st TFW, at Yokota AB, Japan.

Tactical Air Command began deploying F-105 squadrons in March 1965 as follows:

- 563d Tactical Fighter Squadron 7 April 1965 – August 1965
- 562d Tactical Fighter Squadron August 1965 – Dec 1965
- 334th Tactical Fighter Squadron August 1965 – February 1966
- 335th Tactical Fighter Squadron November 1965 – December 1966

On 2 March 1965 Takhli-based F-105s participated in the first airstrike of Operation Rolling Thunder.

In May 1965 the 6441st TFW (Provisional) became the host unit at Takhli. On 8 May the 6235th Combat Support Group was organized at Takhli. On 8 July 1965 the 6235th Tactical Fighter Wing was activated to join the 6441st TFW at Takhli.

The F-105 was destined to become a major participant in the war in Vietnam, and the primary aircraft flown from Takhli during the Vietnam War. The permanent assignment of the 355th Tactical Fighter Wing to Takhli in December 1965 ended the temporary squadron rotations from continental US bases.

On 31 October 1965 Takhli-based F-105s conducted a joint operation with the US Navy to attack North Vietnamese surface-to-air missile (SAM) sites. A specially equipped Navy A-4E Skyhawk accompanied a group of F-105s on an airstrike near Kép. The A-4 detected the Fan Song radar and then observed the launch of SA-2 SAMs nearby. The F-105s attacked the launch site, while the A-4 attacked the radar site, being shot down in the process. More Navy jets attacked both sites and a third launch site.

==== Air refueling mission ====
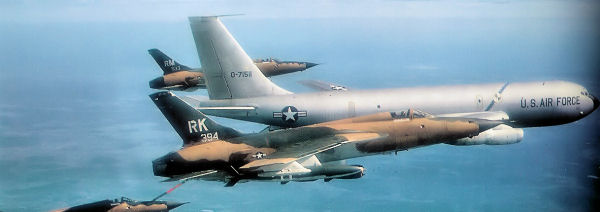
F-105s from the 354th and 333d TFS refueling from a Takhli KC-135

In order to support the buildup of US airpower in Southeast Asia as a result of the Gulf of Tonkin Incident, in early August 1964, 8 KB-50Js of Detachment 1, 421st Air Refueling Squadron, was deployed at Takhli from Yokota AB, Japan. The 421st stayed at Takhli until 15 January 1965 when it was inactivated. The aerial refueling mission was taken over by a detachment of the 4252d Strategic Wing from Misawa Air Base with KC-135s replacing the KB-50s.

In September 1965, increasing demands for aerial refueling in Southeast Asia led to the deployment of Strategic Air Command (SAC) KC-135 tankers to Takhli under the designation of King Cobra to supplement those at Don Muang RTAFB in refuelling the Thai-based fighters.

In January 1967, the SAC 4258th Strategic Wing assumed full responsibility for the Takhli KC-135 tankers formerly belonging to the 4252d SW at Kadena AB, Okinawa. At years end, the tanker force numbered 5 at Takhli. In February 1968, the KC-135s were transferred to Ching Chuan Kang Air Base Taiwan.

==== Air rescue ====
In early August Detachment 4, 36th Air Rescue Squadron equipped with HH-43Bs deployed to Korat on TDY from Osan Air Base, South Korea to provide base search and rescue. In November the Detachment returned to Osan AB and was replaced with HH-43Bs transferred from Bien Hoa Air Base, South Vietnam.

In mid-1965 the rescue detachment was redesignated Detachment 2, 38th Air Rescue Squadron.

==== Airlift ====
In June 1965 a TDY unit of 2 C-130s from E Flight, 21st Troop Carrier Squadron began airlift operations from Takhli into Long Tieng, Laos in support of the CIA and the army of Major General Vang Pao. The demand for flights increased with daily flights into various locations in Laos by 1967.

=== 355th Tactical Fighter Wing ===
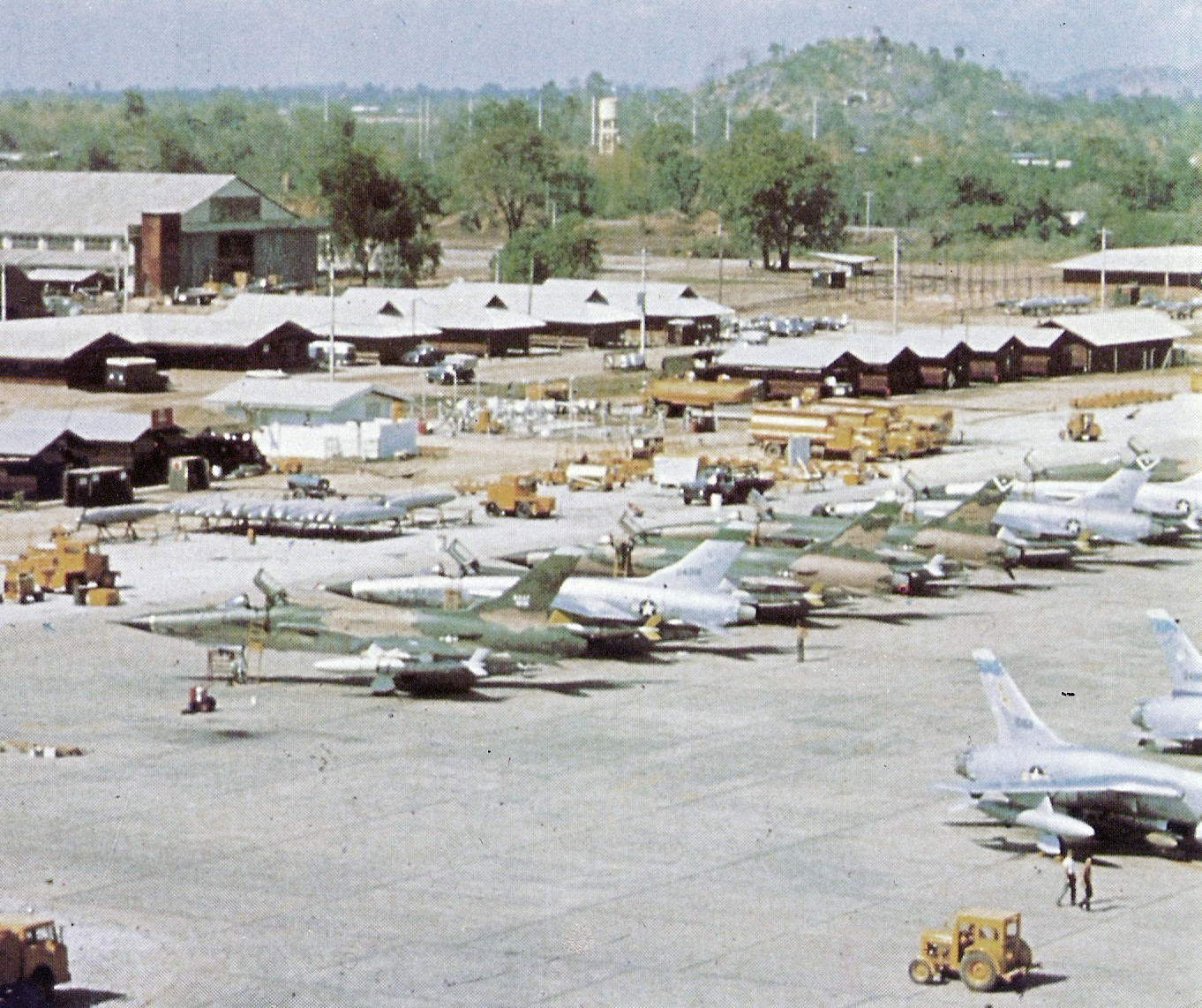
4th TFW F-105Ds at Takhli in 1965

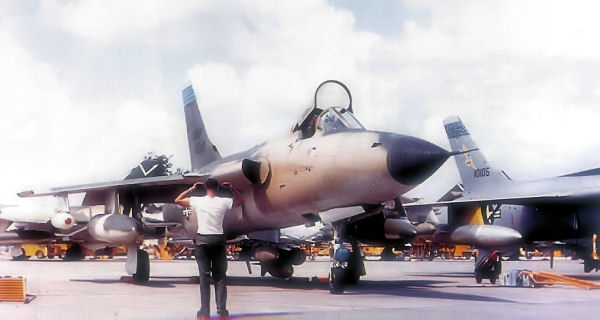
F-105Ds from the 334th TFS at Takhli, 1966

On 8 November 1965 the 355th Tactical Fighter Wing made a permanent change of station from McConnell AFB to Takhli without personnel or equipment as the host unit at the base. The provisional 6235th TFW was inactivated and the equipment and personnel at Takhli were absorbed into the new wing structure. Previously, all of the 355th's squadrons at McConnell had been deployed to various bases in Southeast Asia, two of which were reassigned to Takhli (357th, 354th TFS) and brought back under its control.

Squadrons of the 355th were:

- 333d Tactical Fighter Squadron: 8 December 1965 – 15 October 1970 F-105D/F (RK; reassigned from 4485th Composite Wing, Eglin AFB, Florida)
- 354th Tactical Fighter Squadron: 28 November 1965 – 10 December 1970 F-105D/F (RM; reassigned from 8th TFW, Kadena AB, Okinawa)
- 357th Tactical Fighter Squadron: 29 January 1966 – 10 December 1970 F-105D/F/G (RU; reassigned from 6234th TFW, Korat RTAFB)

The rotational TDY 334th TFS and 335th TFS squadrons transferred their aircraft to the newly assigned permanent squadrons at Takhli.

==== Operation Rolling Thunder ====
Under Operation Rolling Thunder the 355th TFW participated in major strikes against North Vietnamese logistics. During this time, the wing flew 11,892 sorties, downed 2 MiGs, and damaged 8 more. Although the F-105 was not designed to be primarily a dogfighter, the aircraft was successful in downing at least 27.5 confirmed North Vietnamese MiGs in aerial combat. On 10 March 1967 Air Force Captain Max C. Brestel, flying from Takhli, became the only F-105 pilot to shoot down two MiGs during the Vietnam War.

On 10 March 1967 355th TFW F-105s took part in the first attacks on the Thái Nguyên ironworks, Captain Merlyn H. Dethlefsen won the Medal of Honor for actions including destroying two SAM sites during a mission from Takhli. His back-seater, Captain Kevin A. Gilroy was awarded the Air Force Cross for this mission. 4 355th TFW F-105s were shot down in attacks on the ironworks on 10 and 11 March.

On 19 April 1967, Major Leo K. Thorsness earned the Congressional Medal of Honor on another F-105 mission from Takhli. Thorsness destroyed one SAM site with a missile, bombed another, shot down a MiG, damaged another, and repeatedly chased or lured other MiGs away from an ongoing rescue mission for his wingman, who had been shot down by AAA fire. Thorsness' back-seater, Captain Harold E. Johnson, was awarded the Air Force Cross for the mission. Less than two weeks after this mission, the two were shot down and became prisoners of war.

In May 1967, the 355th TFW received its first Presidential Unit Citation for actions from 1 January 1966 to 10 October 1966.

On 2 June 1967 355th TFW F-105s attacked a AAA site on the coast near Haiphong, during this attack the Soviet ship Turkestan was damaged and the Soviets protested the attack. The deputy commander of the 355th TFW Colonel Jacksel M. Broughton destroyed the F-105 gun-camera film and was court-martialed but ultimately acquitted.

On 11 August 1967, the 355th and 388th Tactical Fighter Wing conducted a raid on the Paul Doumer railroad and highway bridge in Hanoi. Thirty-six strike aircraft led by the 355th dropped 94 tons of bombs and destroyed one span of the bridge and part of the highway.

On 8 October 1967, F-105s from the 355th TFW attacked and destroyed, on the ground, 2 Mil Mi-6 and 4 Mil Mi-4 Soviet-built helicopters. On 24 October, the 355th led the first strike against the Phúc Yên Air Base north of Hanoi leaving it unserviceable. On 14 & 15 December the wing again attacked the Paul Doumer Bridge destroying 7 spans of the bridge.

In November 1967, Gerald Gustafson received the Air Force Cross after he refused to leave his comrade until other escort aircraft could be vectored in to give the wounded pilot assistance in reaching his home base safely.

In January 1970, the 355th TFW received its 2nd Presidential Unit Citation for actions from 11 to 12 August 1967 and 24–28 October 1967.

In July, the 355th TFW received its record 3rd Presidential Unit Citation for actions from 12 April 1968 through 30 April 1969. During this time frame, the wing dropped 32,000 tons of ordnance on 2,100 targets while flying 17,000 combat sorties.

==== Wild Weasels ====
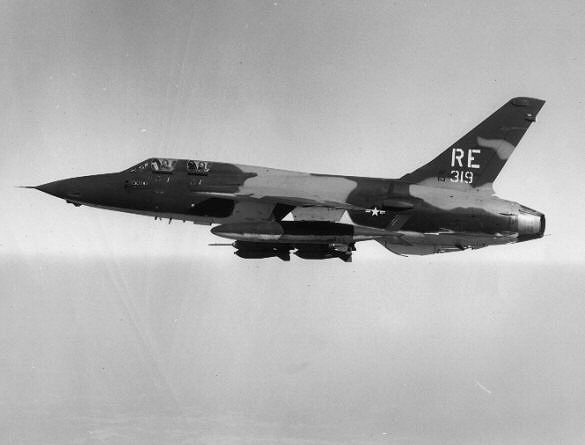
Republic F-105F-1-RE Thunderchief Serial 63-8319 from the 44th TFS. Later, this aircraft was reconfigured to the F-105G "Wild Weasel" configuration.

The first "Wild Weasel" aircraft came to Takhli in 1966. The Wild Weasel concept was originally proposed in 1965 as a method of countering the increasing North Vietnamese SAM threat, using volunteer crews. The mission of the Wild Weasels was to eliminate surface-to-air missile sites in North Vietnam.

This nickname refers to a mission which was carried out by a number of different aircraft types over the years. The first at Takhli were F-100 Super Sabres, which like all Wild Weasels had the job of baiting SAM sites to fire at them. Then all they had to do was evade the missile and lead an attack on the radar facility that guided the SAMs. Sometimes they, or the strike aircraft with them, would fire a radar-seeking AGM-45 Shrike missile which followed the SAM site's radar beam right back down to the transmitting antenna. When these relatively early-technology missiles missed, as often happened, or when the aircraft ran out of missiles, Wild Weasels would attack SAM sites with bombs or their M61 Vulcan 20mm cannon.

The F-105G was the designation given to Wild Weasel F-105Fs which were fitted with greatly improved avionics. The designation EF-105F was temporarily applied to these aircraft, but their designation was eventually changed to F-105G. The first F-105Gs went to the 357th TFS at Tahkli RTAFB during the second half of 1967. The electronic warfare officer (EWO) in an F-105G ran all the new electronic equipment for locating SAM or anti-aircraft artillery (AAA) radars, warning of SAM launches, and sending Shrike missiles down the radar beams.

The 12th Tactical Fighter Squadron of the 18th Tactical Fighter Wing, which had been detached to Korat RTAFB from Okinawa, was also equipped with the F-105G and was temporarily reassigned to Takhli in June 1967. A third Wild Weasel squadron, the 44th Tactical Fighter Squadron was assigned to Takhli from 10 October 1969 to 15 March 1971.

The detachment from the 12th TFS returned to its main unit at Korat and the 44th TFS moved to Korat when the decision was made to consolidate the units of the Wild Weasel mission.

==== B-66 Destroyer Operations ====
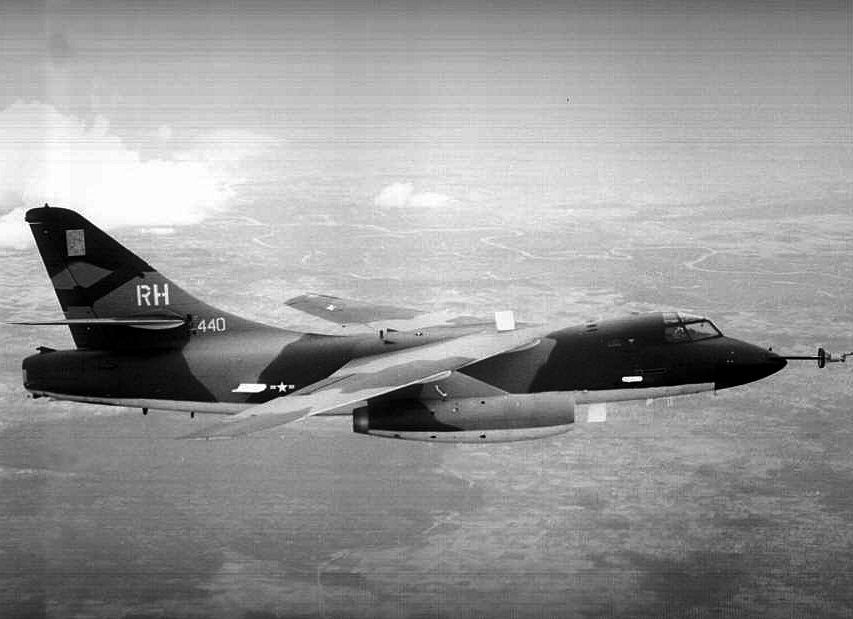
Douglas E/RB-66B-DL Destroyer Serial 54–440 from the 42d Tactical Electronic Warfare Squadron

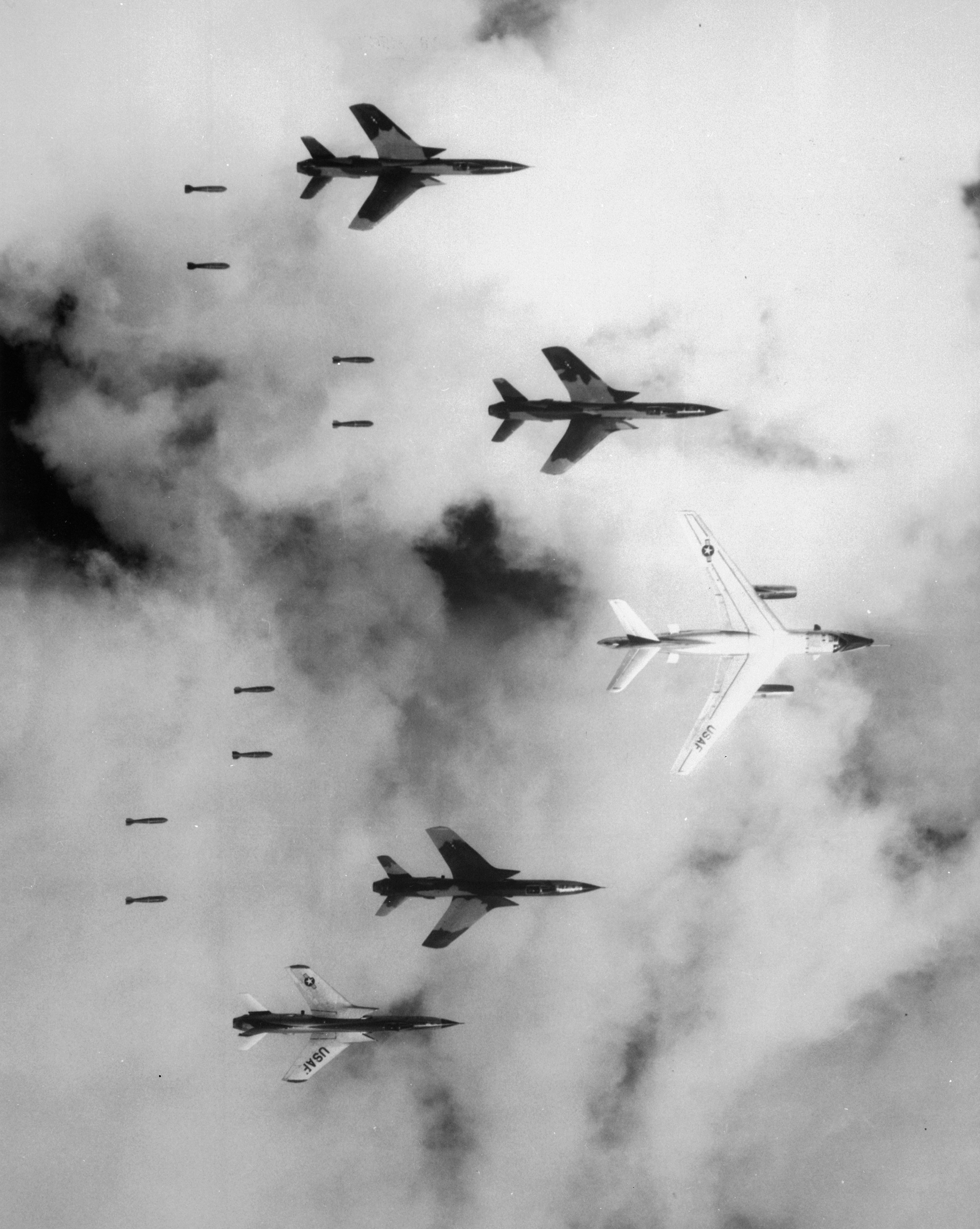
F-105s with an EB-66 from the 355th TFW on a bomb run over enemy territory

As part of the electronic countermeasure (ECM) weaponry that the USAF employed against North Vietnamese air defenses, variants of the Douglas B-66 were adapted to serve in the electronic countermeasures role as radar jamming aircraft. All of the bombing equipment was removed and replaced by electronic jamming equipment and chaff dispensing pods were carried. They would join strike aircraft during their missions over North Vietnam to jam enemy radar installations.

By June 1965 4 RB-66Bs and 4 EB-66Cs were based at Takhli as part of the 9th Tactical Reconnaissance Squadron. On 8 September 1965 3 more EB-66Cs were deployed to Takhli from Shaw Air Force Base South Carolina. On 21 October 5 EB-66Cs of the 25th Tactical Reconnaissance Squadron formerly at Chambley-Bussieres Air Base, France arrived at Takhli. In late November 1965, the 41st Tactical Reconnaissance Squadron moved to Takhli taking over from the 9th TRS which was discontinued.

During January 1966 the 42d Electronic Countermeasures Squadron arrived from flying RB-66C and WB-66s variants of the B-66 on photo reconnaissance and electronic warfare missions.

==== Operation Ranch Hand ====
The herbicide spraying missions began in Vietnam in 1961, and it has recently been revealed that some took place from Thai bases, including Takhli, as early as 1966. This pre-dates the USAF receiving permission to use herbicides for clearing areas on and around Thai bases for area and perimeter defense, which was given in 1969. The missions in 1966 defoliated areas surrounding parts of the Ho Chi Minh Trail in Laos, near the Vietnam border and north of the Vietnamese Demilitarized Zone and had the approval of both the Thai and Laotian governments.

C-123 aircraft were used on the missions. The missions were extensive enough to have required pre-positioning or maintaining stocks of the herbicides.

==== F-111A Combat Lancer ====
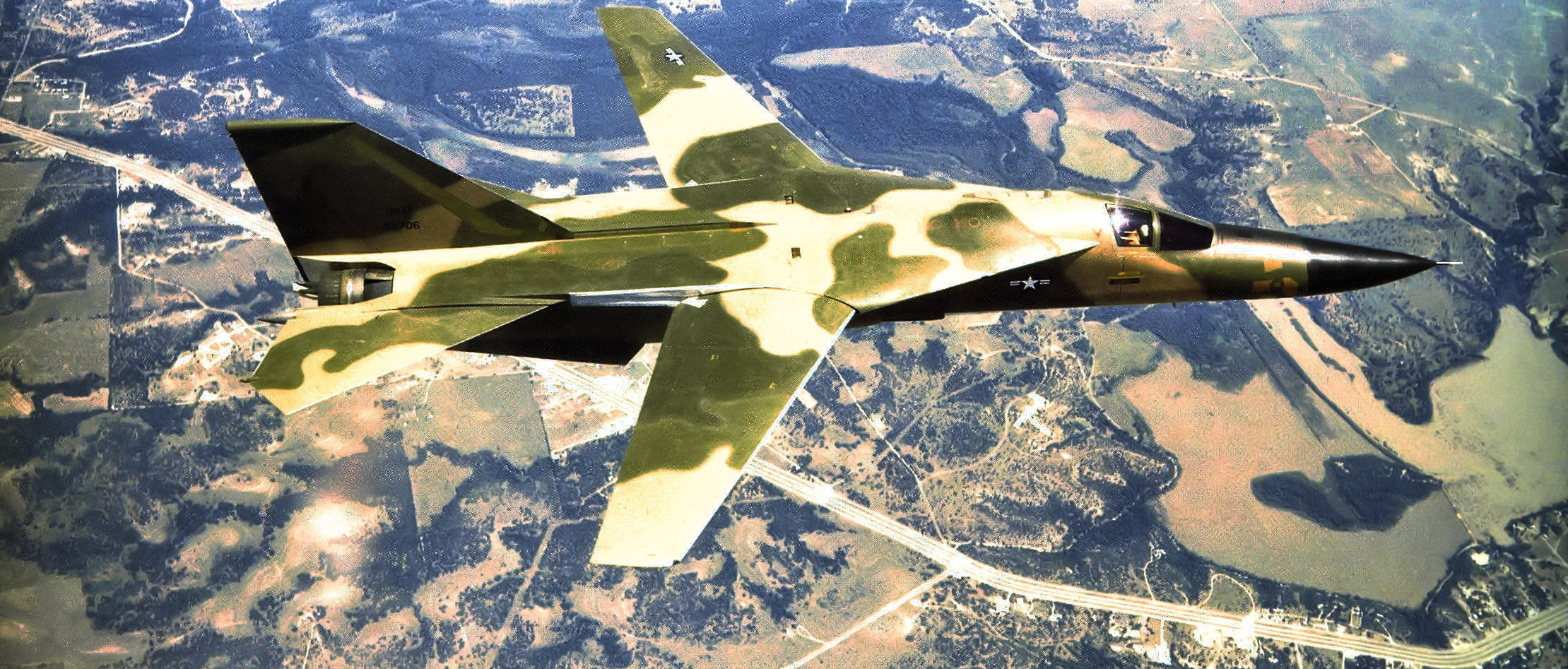
428th TFS Combat Lancer F-111A over Southeast Asia, 1968

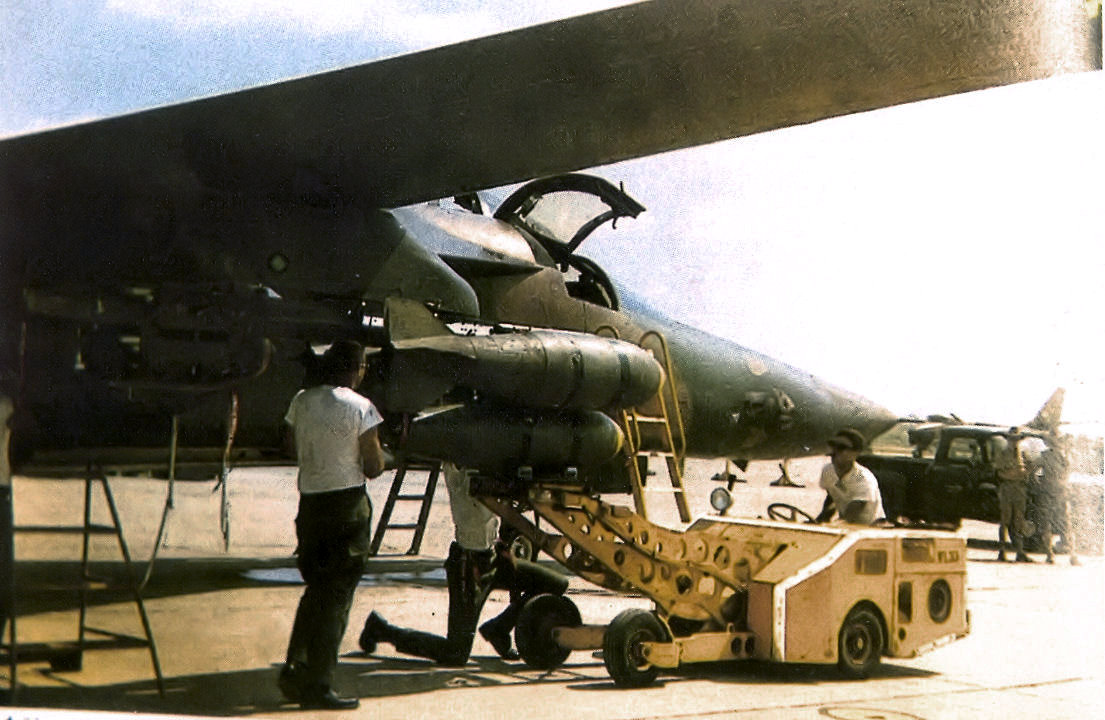
Combat Lancer F-111A being loaded with bombs, March 1968

In early 1968, the USAF decided to rush a small detachment of F-111As to Southeast Asia for combat test and evaluation under a program known as Combat Lancer. Six F-111As of the 428th Tactical Fighter Squadron, 474th Tactical Fighter Wing were allocated to the Combat Lancer program, and departed Nellis AFB for Takhli on 15 March 1968.

By the end of that month, 55 night missions had been flown against targets in North Vietnam, but two aircraft had been lost. 66–0022 had been lost on 28 March, and 66-0017 on 30 March. Replacement aircraft had left Nellis, but the loss of a third F-111A (66-0024) on 22 April halted F-111A combat operations. However, the aircraft remained poised for combat, but they saw little action before their return to the United States in November.

The cause of the first two losses continues to be unknown as the wreckages have never been recovered. It turned out that the third loss on 22 April was not due to enemy action, but was traced to a failure of a hydraulic control-valve rod for the horizontal stabilizer which caused the aircraft to pitch up uncontrollably. Further inspection of the remaining fleet of F-111As revealed 42 aircraft with the same potential failures. It is speculated that this failure could also have contributed to the two earlier losses had the failure caused a pitch down while at low altitude.

==== Son Tay Raid ====
From 10 November 1970, Special Forces and Air Force Special Operations personnel of the Joint Contingency Task Group and two MC-130 Combat Talon aircraft staged at Takhli in preparation for Operation Ivory Coast, the attempt to rescue US prisoners of war (POWs) from the Son Tay prison camp in North Vietnam.

The raiders arrived at Takhli on 18 November and on 20 November, they took off in a C-130 bound for Udorn RTAFB. There they boarded helicopters for the mission. Everything about this mission went to plan, except that when they hit the prison camp the prisoners had already been moved elsewhere.

==== 1971 closure ====
Takhli began closing down in late 1969, as a part of a general withdrawal of American forces from Southeast Asia.

- The 41st TRS was inactivated on 31 October 1969.
- The 42d ECS squadron was transferred to Korat in August 1970.

On 6 October 1970 the wing's last F-105 combat mission of the war, an airstrike in Laos, was flown.

The 357th and 333d TFSs (F-105) were reassigned to the 23d Tactical Fighter Wing at McConnell Air Force Base, Kansas. The 44th TFS was reassigned to the 18th Tactical Fighter Wing at Kadena AB, Okinawa. The 354th TFS was inactivated in place, then reactivated without equipment or personnel at Davis-Monthan Air Force Base, Arizona.

The 355 TFW ceased combat operations at Takhli on 7 October 1970, and on the 12th, the wing retired its colors with a 12-aircraft flyover of F-105s. With the ending of F-105 operations, Detachment 2, 38th Air Rescue Squadron inactivated on 15 November 1970. The last USAF personnel left Takhli RTAFB by April 1971.

=== 1972 reopening ===
On 30 March 1972, the North Vietnamese launched their Easter Offensive, a conventional invasion of South Vietnam. In response, the USAF launched Operation Freedom Train, later redesignated Operation Linebacker, the first sustained bombing of North Vietnam by the US since November 1968. On 6 May the U.S. began reopening the base to support operations. Upon re-opening the base for Linebacker, most of the barracks had been stripped of all plumbing and electrical fixtures after the 1970 closing. Most SAC enlisted personnel were housed in the recovered dorms with one shower and one toilet set up by the "Red Horse" civil engineer teams and a few operating light bulbs in the large open-bay dorms. TAC enlisted personnel lived in a large "tent city" made up of line after line of General Purpose medium and large canvas tents.

==== 49th Tactical Fighter Wing ====
The USAF reacted to the invasion quickly and with many resources. One of these was Operation Constant Guard III, the largest movement that TAC had ever performed. In nine days, they deployed 72 F-4D Phantom IIs of the 49th Tactical Fighter Wing from Holloman AFB, New Mexico, to Takhli. The move included more than 4,000 personnel and 1,600 tons of cargo.

On 5 May about 35 members of an PACAF advance party returned to Takhli to prepare the facility for re-opening and activation. The advance party found that it was a 4-day national holiday in Thailand and that the RTAF base commander was unaware of the US redeployment, nevertheless they were able to ready the base facilities for the arrival of the first fighter units on 10 May.

On 10 May the first personnel from Holloman began to arrive and conducted their first strikes the following day. Squadrons deployed to Takhli were:

- 7th Tactical Fighter Squadron
- 8th Tactical Fighter Squadron
- 9th Tactical Fighter Squadron
- 417th Tactical Fighter Squadron

Along with the F-4s, other units that were deployed to Takhli were:

- 11th Air Refueling Squadron (KC-135) from Altus AFB, Oklahoma
- 4th Tactical Fighter Squadron (F-4E) from Da Nang AB, South Vietnam
- 8th Tactical Fighter Wing's AC-130 Spectre gunships from Ubon RTAFB, which became the Det 1, 16th Special Operations Squadron.
- 92d Air Refueling Squadron (KC-135) from Fairchild AFB, Washington

During this deployment the 49th flew more than 21,000 combat hours over just about every battle zone from An Loc to Hanoi. During five months of combat, the wing did not lose any aircraft or personnel. The unit received an Air Force Outstanding Unit Award with Combat "V" Device for its participation.

==== 366th Tactical Fighter Wing ====
On 30 June the 366th Tactical Fighter Wing was reassigned to Takhli from Da Nang AB, South Vietnam, taking over host unit responsibilities from the 49th TFW. Its operational squadrons were:

- 4th Tactical Fighter Squadron (F-4E)
- 421st Tactical Fighter Squadron (F-4E)

From Takhli 366th TFW aircrews flew air superiority missions over Vietnam. In late October the squadrons of the Holloman-based 49th TFW returned home. The Da Nang-based 4th and 421st TFSs were transferred to the 432 Tactical Reconnaissance Wing at Udon RTAFB on 31 October 1972.

The 366th TFW was inactivated in place on 31 October 1972, being reactivated the same day without personnel or equipment at Mountain Home Air Force Base, Idaho.

==== 474th Tactical Fighter Wing ====
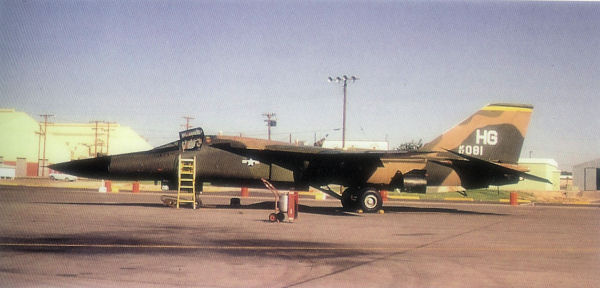
General Dynamics F-111A of the 429th TFS/347th TFW taken at Nellis AFB, Nevada in 1975 still showing its 347th TFW tail code

With the departure of the 366th, the 474th Tactical Fighter Wing (Deployed) equipped with F-111s arrived at Takhli on TDY from Nellis AFB on 27 September 1972.

The 474th TFW flew F-111As. Operational fighter squadrons of the 474th were:

- 428th Tactical Fighter Squadron
- 429th Tactical Fighter Squadron
- 430th Tactical Fighter Squadron

Their first combat mission, started only hours after their arrival at Takhli, resulted in the disappearance of one of the aircraft and a week-long cancellation of F-111 missions. The F-111s returned to action, losing a further three aircraft in the next six weeks of airstrikes.

The 474th's F-111s also participated in Operation Linebacker II in December 1972 flying 154 night/single-ship sorties into the high-threat area of North Vietnam with the loss of 2 aircraft.

In early 1973, with the suspension of bombing in North Vietnam and the resumption of peace negotiations, inflight refueling requirements decreased markedly. As a result, in late January 1973 many of the augmented tankers of the 11th Air Refueling Squadron and the 92nd Air Refueling Squadron returned to the US. The 430th TFS returned with the 474th TFW to Nellis AFB on 22 March 1973.

==== 347th Tactical Fighter Wing ====
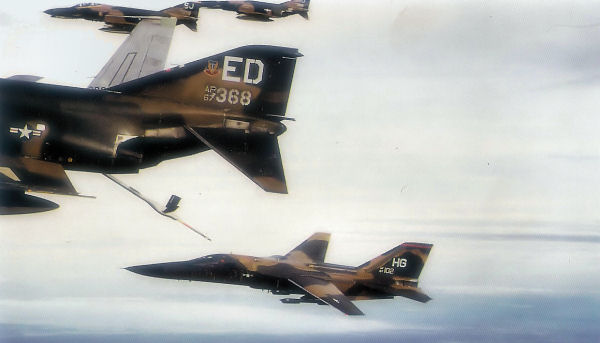
F-111A from the 428th TFS refueling from a KC-135 tanker, 1974

On 30 July 1973 the TDY of the 474th TFW ended. The 428th and 429th TFS were assigned to the newly transferred 347th Tactical Fighter Wing from Mountain Home AFB which arrived on 30 July 1973.

For a brief two-week period the 347th flew combat operations into Cambodia until 15 August, when the final mission of Constant Guard IV was flown. After the cease-fire, the wing was maintained in a combat-ready status for possible contingency actions. The F-111s engaged in more than 4,000 sorties with a loss of only six aircraft.

During January 1974 the Secretary of Defense announced a realignment of Thailand resources, with the final pullout of air resources by the end of 1976.

On 12 July the 347 TFW's F-111s and the AC-130 gunships from the 16th SOS were transferred to Korat Royal Thai Air Force Base.

Detachment 10, 3d Aerospace Rescue and Recovery Group which had deployed to Takhli on reopening of the base was inactivated in July.

On 31 July 1974 phase down of operations at Takhli RTAFB was completed ahead of schedule, and the base was officially returned to the Thai Government on 12 September. All remaining US personnel departed on 14 September.

=== Thai Air Force use after 1975 ===
After the US withdrawal from Thailand in 1976, the RTAF consolidated the equipment left by the departing USAF units in accordance with government-to-government agreements, and the RTAF assumed use of the base at Takhli. The American withdrawal had quickly revealed to the Thai government the inadequacy of its air force in the event of a conventional war in Southeast Asia. Accordingly, in the 1980s the government allotted large amounts of money for the purchase of modern aircraft and spare parts.

Thirty-eight F-5E and F-5F Tiger II fighter-bombers formed the nucleus of the RTAF's defense and tactical firepower. The F-5Es were accompanied by training teams of American civilian and military technicians, who worked with members of the RTAF.

From 13 to 17 December 1982 Commando West V was held. This marked the first visit of a PACAF tactical unit to Thailand since the early 1970s.

== See also ==
- United States Air Force in Thailand
- United States Pacific Air Forces
- Seventh Air Force
- Thirteenth Air Force

== Bibliography ==
- Endicott, Judy G. (1999) Active Air Force wings as of 1 October 1995; USAF active flying, space, and missile squadrons as of 1 October 1995. Maxwell AFB, Alabama: Office of Air Force History. CD-ROM.
- Davies, Peter E.; Thornborough, Anthony M. (1997). F-111 Aardvark. Ramsbury, Marlborough Wiltshire. UK: The Crowood Press Ltd. ISBN 1-86126-079-2.
- Glasser, Jeffrey D. (1998). The Secret Vietnam War: The United States Air Force in Thailand, 1961–1975. McFarland & Company. ISBN 0-7864-0084-6.
- Martin, Patrick (1994). Tail Code: The Complete History of USAF Tactical Aircraft Tail Code Markings. Schiffer Military Aviation History. ISBN 0-88740-513-4.
- USAAS-USAAC-USAAF-USAF Aircraft Serial Numbers—1908 to present
- The Royal Thai Air Force (English pages)
- Royal Thai Air Force – Overview
