= Gustavsen =

Gustavsen is a common family name in Scandinavian countries. Notable people with the surname include:

== Music ==
- Tord Gustavsen (born 1970), Norwegian jazz pianist
- Tord Gustavsen Trio, Norwegian jazz trio
- Troels Gustavsen (born 1991), Danish singer and also part of duo Noah

== Politics ==
- Øyvind Gustavsen (born 1937), Norwegian civil servant
- Finn Gustavsen (1926–2005), Norwegian politician
- Laila Gustavsen, (born 1973), Norwegian politician
- Terje Moe Gustavsen (1954–2019), Norwegian politician

== Sports ==
- Henrik Gustavsen (born 1992), Norwegian football (soccer) player

== Others ==
- Bjørn Gustavsen (born 1938), Norwegian academic and researcher

== See also ==
- Gustafson, includes Gustafson, Gustafsson, Gustavson, or Gustavsson
