= New Richland Odd Fellows Hall =

- Strangers Refuge Lodge Number 74, IOOF
- U.S. National Register of Historic Places
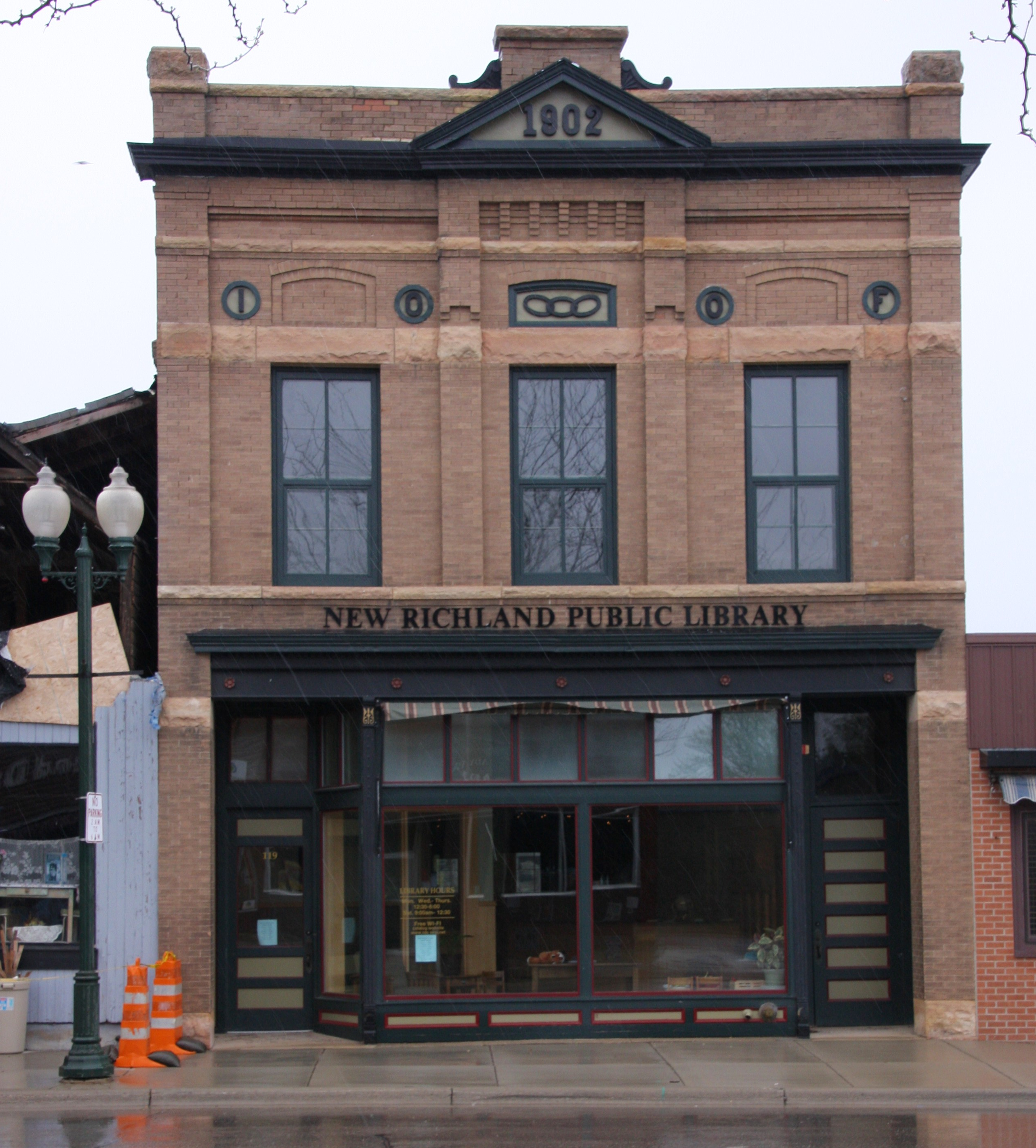
- The building on a rainy day in 2016

- Location within Minnesota Location within the United States
- Location: 119 South Broadway Avenue, New Richland, Minnesota
- Coordinates: 43°53′36.4″N 93°29′37″W
- Area: Less than one acre
- Built: 1902
- Architect: Henry A. Paine
- NRHP reference No.: 06000601
- Designated: July 12, 2006

The New Richland Odd Fellows Hall is a historic Independent Order of Odd Fellows (IOOF) clubhouse in New Richland, Minnesota, United States, built in 1902. It was listed on the National Register of Historic Places in 2006 under the name Strangers Refuge Lodge Number 74, IOOF for its local significance in the themes of entertainment/recreation and social history. It was nominated for being the home of a large and important local fraternal organization, and for serving as a venue for a wide range of other groups and events. The building now houses the New Richland Public Library.

== History ==
The New Richland IOOF chapter organized as Strangers Refuge Lodge Number 74 in 1880, two years before any other fraternal organization or church was established in the community. It met in a wood-frame building that had been constructed in 1878 before commissioning the existing hall shortly after the turn of the 20th century.

Membership in fraternal societies like the Odd Fellows was the primary source for insurance and welfare benefits in the United States before the 1930s. Many, including Lodge Number 74, provided money and support to sick members and death benefits to their widows or orphans. They were an important social outlet in small communities. By 1925 membership in Lodge Number 74 had grown from 18 men to 75.

Money for these benefits came from membership dues and rental fees. The New Richland Odd Fellows Hall was built as an event venue, and was often called the New Richland Opera House. Balls, dances, plays, music performances, high school graduations, and many other events were held there. Church groups and other fraternal organizations rented the hall for meetings.

The hall's days as a major event venue ended in 1918 when part of the building was rented out as a storefront. In 1924 the entire first floor was converted to a general store run by Lebanese immigrant Attalla Abraham. Groups continued to use the second floor for meetings. Strangers Refuge Lodge Number 74 continued to meet there until it folded in 1979. The ground-floor business stayed in the Abraham family until 1986. The building came under city ownership and shortly after 2006 was renovated into New Richland's public library.

== See also ==
- National Register of Historic Places listings in Waseca County, Minnesota
