= Allan Gutheim =

Swedish film composer (born 1962)

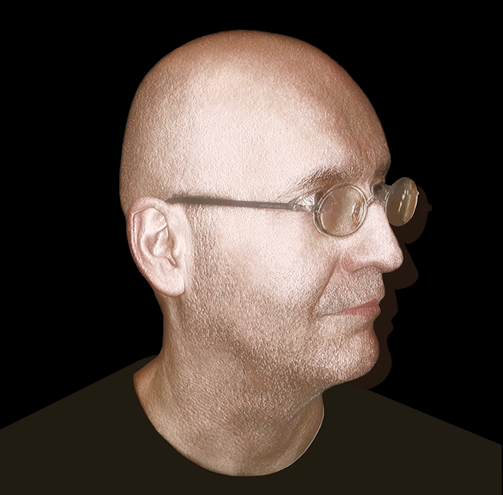
- Allan Gutheim

Background information
- Born: 13 November 1962 (age 63); Vantör borough, Stockholm
- Origin: Sweden
- Label: The Sublunar Society
- Website: allangutheim.com

Allan Philip Henri Gutheim (born 13 November 1962) is a Swedish film composer. He was born in the Vantör borough of Stockholm. He composed music for the film Hägring in 1984. With his wife he runs Leksaksland, a toy museum, thought to be the largest private toy collection in Sweden.
