= Catholic Relief Services, Pakistan =

Charity

Catholic Relief Services (CRS) first began its work in 1943. It is the official international humanitarian agency of the Catholic Church in the United States. The agency provides assistance to people in 99 countries and territories based on need, regardless of race, nationality or creed. Catholic Relief Services is a member of Caritas Internationalis, a confederation of 162 Catholic relief, development and social service organizations operating in over 200 countries and territories worldwide. Caritas Internationalis is the official humanitarian agency of the global Catholic Church.

CRS has worked in Pakistan since 1954. CRS Pakistan has enhanced its emergency activities to respond to the drought, the Afghan refugee crisis and earthquake emergency response and rebuilding process. The CRS office is located in Islamabad and has 227 staff.

In 2023 Gul Wali Khan was CRS program manager for Pakistan.

== Work in Pakistan ==
CRS promotes peace, justice and reconciliation by improving access to food and credit, and by increasing the capacity of community-based organizations. CRS fosters harmony and collaboration between people of different faiths, supports education and human capacity development, and assists those unable to provide for themselves.

Pakistan has issues regarding poverty, poor access to health care and education, and inadequate hygiene facilities. Working with local partner organizations and Caritas, CRS has implemented four strategic objectives to achieve their goal to serve the communities affected by the 2005 earthquake:

- Earthquake-affected families live in a secure environment in their community of origin
- Earthquake-affected communities have improved access to water and sanitation facilities
- Earthquake-affected children have resumed their primary education in their communities of origin
- Earthquake-affected communities have resumed their livelihoods

In addition, CRS has strengthened its focus on nonformal education, care and support to people living with HIV and AIDS, and teaching people how to support themselves in the long term in drought-prone areas. Some specific examples of the other work include:

== Drought Mitigation Program ==
The U.S. Department of Agriculture funds this program, which is serving over 21,000 individuals in the provinces of Sindh and Balochistan. The program improves people's access to water for consumption and production, with a particular emphasis on the role of women.

== Nonformal Education ==
This program improves education opportunities for out-of-school children and adolescents in four provinces by developing stronger parent-teacher associations; creating nonformal schools to serve older and otherwise marginalized children, and training teachers in modern, participatory education methods.

== Recognition ==
On 21 September 2006, Pakistan President General Pervez Musharraf presented Catholic Relief Services with the prestigious Sitara-i-Eisaar (Star of Sacrifice) award honoring the agency's response to the devastating 2005 earthquake.

The 7.6 magnitude earthquake that struck on 8 October 2005, killed an estimated 73,000 people in Pakistan and left nearly 3 million homeless. In the past year, CRS has provided more than 166,000 people with emergency supplies, shelter, education, water and sanitation materials, and livelihood support.

The CRS President Ken Hackett, personally accepted the award during a ceremony at the Pakistan Embassy in Washington, D.C..

With more than 50 years experience working in Pakistan, CRS was among the first agencies to respond. To date, CRS has repaired or opened 130 schools, provided support for semi-permanent shelters for 130,000 people, built latrines and washrooms for 89,000 people, restored water sources for more than 18,000 people and helped tens of thousands restart their economic livelihoods.

With private and public funds totaling more than $32 million, CRS assistance in Pakistan is one of the largest disaster response efforts in the agency's history.

== Temporary setback ==
The agency lost its license in 2018 when thousands of non-governmental organisations' licenses were revoked allegedly to prevent terrorist organisations from receiving funding.

== Flood relief ==
In 2023 CRS is working in the Sindh province affected by the rains during 2022. They have sponsored sanitation and clean-water projects, cash disbursements and micro-economic projects to help women embroider garments and other useful items.
