= Sidney Redding Mason =

American politician (1925–2009)

Sidney Redding Mason (April 25, 1925 – January 29, 2009) was an American businessman and politician.

Mason was born in Flint, Michigan and served in the United States Navy and was commissioned a lieutenant. He was an aviator. In 1957, Mason moved to Duluth, Minnesota and was involved with the insurance and banking businesses. He served in the Minnesota House of Representatives in 1971 and 1972 and was a Republican. Mason died at his home in Duluth, Minnesota.
