= Mark Gustavson =

American composer

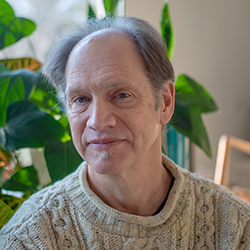
- Born: September 19, 1959 (age 66); Brooklyn, New York, U.S.
- Education: Columbia University
- Occupations: composer, clarinetist, educator, and record producer
- Years active: 1979–present
- Notable work: In-Between
- Style: avant garde
- Children: Marina Gustavson
- Awards: American Academy of Arts and Letters, Fulbright Fellowship
- Website: markgustavson.com

Mark Gustavson (born September 19, 1959 in Brooklyn, New York) is an American composer of contemporary classical music.

== Biography ==
Gustavson lives on eastern Long Island and teaches at various universities in the New York City area, including Adelphi University and Nassau Community College. He graduated from the University of Illinois in 1981 and received the D.M.A. from Columbia University in 1990. Gustavson also studied at the Sweelinck Conservatory with Ton De Leeuw on a Fulbright Fellowship in 1985–86 and was a composition fellow at Tanglewood in 1979. His primary composition teachers were Chinary Ung, Ben Johnston and Fred Lerdahl.

== Music ==
Western classical music, folk music from around the world, and jazz blended with Eastern and Western philosophy have all influenced Gustavson's style. He mostly favors notated music that often sounds improvised. Form is often based on different approaches to variations influenced by naturally occurring cycles. Rhythm can be complex or deceptively simple; for example, the third movement of Quintet for clarinet, two violins, viola, and cello is a four-voice canon of continuous eighth notes that creates a background for the solo clarinet.

An improvisatory quality is suggested by the unpredictable entrances of each voice. In A Fool's Journey, it is the complex textures that create the illusion of improvisation. The complex layering of lines or polyphony in this example from "A Fool's Journey" purposely avoids the coming together of the independent voices. The Prelude to "Lament" for piano solo demonstrates another way to create the sense of improvisation by using a basso ostinato in the left hand and a rhythmically free right hand. One more example from a recent work "Turning" for bass clarinet, percussion, piano, and double bass explores many ways of creating the illusion of improvisation. This example demonstrates metrical independence of the four instruments, and at times, simultaneously in four different meters.

Quintet
clip from the 3rd movement

A Fool's Journey
clip from 2nd movement

His music has been recognized with various grants, awards, and prizes, including grants from the, Alice M. Ditson Fund, the American Academy of Arts and Letters Walter Hinrichsen Award (1987), the Joseph H. Bearns Prize, the BMI Student Composer Award (1979, 1982, 1983), and the ASCAP Foundation Morton Gould Young Composer Award.

Recently his collaborative audio-visual work with media artist Chris Myhr In-Between was a “Semi-Finalist” in the Blowup Film Fest, an international film festival in Chicago; shown at the Psychedelic Music and Film Festival 2022 in New York City; and presented at the Convergence Leicester 2022 in Leicester, UK, "Immersions and Resonances" at in South River, ON, Canada; and the.

In the first decade of the 21st century, Gustavson's attention turned to texts and vocal music. Two works of note are The Fisherman Songs for bass/baritone and piano and Lament, a monodrama for bass/baritone, bass clarinet, percussion, piano, female chorus, and contrabass, using a poem "Lament" by Dylan Thomas and the Welsh hymn “Llef”.

Prelude from Lament for bass clarinet, percussion, piano, and double bass is performed by the pianist Jacob Rhodebeck and Turning was performed by the Stony Brook Contemporary Chamber Players. A recording with Quintet performed by Contempo and Dissolving Images for solo piano performed by Lisa Moore are available on Albany Records, and "Dissolving Images" and "Quintet" are published by Edition Peters.

=== Select list of compositions ===
Orchestra

- Dust Dance (2010)
- Hymn to the Vanished (2001) for string orchestra
- Silent Moon (1998)
- Waves (1988)

Band and wind ensemble

- Hymn to the Vanished (2017) arranged for concert band
- The Emperor's Music (2000) for twelve antiphonal solo brass

Chamber

- Wheel (2014) for violin and piano
- Hymn to the Vanished (2013) for clarinet and piano
- Turning (2012) for bass clarinet, percussion, piano and double bass
- Chiftetelli (2010) for clarinet, 2 violins, viola and cello
- A Fool's Journey (1999) for flute (pic, alto), clarinet (bcl), percussion, violin and cello
- Two of Cups (1999) for clarinet and viola
- Albion (1997) for wind quintet
- Quintet (1993) for clarinet, 2 violins, viola and cello
- Bag o'Tales (1992) for saxophone quartet
- Plexus (1991) for flute(pic), harp, viola and cello
- Jag (1990) for flute, clarinet, trombone, violin and cello
- Twenty Variations (1982) for flute and piano

Vocal

- Lament (2021) text: Dylan Thomas and Welsh hymn “Llef” monodrama for bass/baritone, bass clarinet, percussion, piano, female chorus, and contrabass
- I Heard an Angel Singing (2016) text: Mark Gustavson for soprano and fixed media
- Fisherman Songs (2010) text: collection for bass/baritone and piano
- The Four Love Songs (1984) for soprano, 2 clarinets, 2 percussion, viola and cello
- The Three Mirrors (1979) text: Edwin Muir for soprano, flute(alto), clarinet, trombone, piano(hammond organ), 3 percussion (tuned water glasses)

Solo instrumental

- The Lounge Pianist (2010) for vocalizing pianist
- Trickster (1997) for clarinet solo
- Dissolving Images (1986) for piano solo

Electroacoustic

- Wingbeat (2021) for harp & 2-channel fixed audio
- I Heard an Angel Singing (2016) for soprano & 2-channel fixed audio
- Footfalls (2015) for fixed media
- Air (2014) for fixed media

Multimedia

- In-between (2020) for 2-channel fixed audio & video (Chris Myhr, artist)

== Discography ==
- Dissolving Images, Lisa Moore, Edward Gilmore, Either/Or, Parnassus, Albany Records, Release date: July 1, 2013.
- Chiftetelli, Contemporary Chamber Players of the University of Chicago, CD Baby, Release date: September 10, 2010.
- Air: Music for Yoga and Meditation, Electroacoustic, Gustavson Sounds Records, Release date: September 2, 2016.
- In-Between, Soundtrack, CD Baby, Release date: September 30, 2021.

== Bibliography ==
- Gustavson, Mark (1994) "Conversation in New York", Contemporary Music Review, Volume 10, American Composers: The Emerging Generation, pp. 121 – 132. ISBN 3-7186-5529-2

== Sources ==
- Maurice Hinson and Wesley Roberts, "Guide to the Pianist's Repertoire, Fourth Edition", Indiana University Press, 2013, p. 459
- Patrick Hanudel, Album Review: "Gustavson: Chamber Music", "American Record Guide", January/February 2014, p. 114
- Buell, Richard (February 7, 2001). "The Smart, Persuasive Sounds of Young Dinosaurs". Boston Globe. Boston, MA. Archived from the original on November 3, 2012 – via HighBeam Research.
- Dyer, Richard (August 6, 2006). "Tanglewood Festival Celebrates Diversity of Contemporary Music". Boston Globe. Boston, MA. Archived from the original on November 3, 2012 – via HighBeam Research.
- Gowan, Bradford, "Review: Dissolving Images by Mark Gustavson", The Piano quarterly, Issue 148, Winter 1988/89, p. 16
- Griffiths, "Looking Eastward for Patterns and a Quiet Sensuality", New York Times, 10 October 1997. Accessed 2 March 2010.
- Kozinn, Allan, "The Classical and the Vernacular, a Cohesive Choice of the Contemporary", New York Times, 2 August 2006. Accessed 2 March 2010.
- Symphony Magazine, "BMI's 28th annual Student Composer Awards", Volume 31, Issues 3-5
