= Jan-Eric Gustafsson =

Swedish psychologist

- Born: 1949 (age 76–77); Falköping, Sweden
- Education: University of Gothenburg
- Scientific career
- Fields: Educational psychology
- Institutions: University of Gothenburg
- Thesis: Verbal and figural aptitudes in relation to instructional methods (1976)
- Doctoral advisor: Kjell Härnqvist

Jan-Eric Gustafsson (born 1949) is a Swedish educational psychologist. He is professor of education at the University of Gothenburg and professor II at the University of Oslo's Faculty of Educational Sciences. He was named a member of the Royal Swedish Academy of Sciences in 1993 and received an honorary doctorate from the University of Oslo in 2017.
