= Bob Chinn (restaurateur) =

American restaurateur (1923–2022)

Bob Chinn (March 2, 1923 – April 15, 2022) was an American restaurateur. His most well-known creation is Bob Chinn's Crab House, in Wheeling, Illinois, which opened in 1982 and was ranked by Forbes magazine in August 2012 as the top grossing restaurant in America with an estimated $24 million in revenue.

In a Chicago Tribune profile he is described as a "brassy, gregarious, outsize personality, operating with the subtlety of a punch to the solar plexus".

Chinn was born in Duluth, Minnesota, in 1923 to Chinese immigrant parents from Taishan, Guangdong. He would move with his family during the Great Depression to Chicago where the family owned the New Wilson Village, an Uptown restaurant. Chinn would later serve in the US Army as part of an artillery unit during World War II. After the war he started a number of his own restaurants. Bob Chinn's Crab House is his 14th and most successful establishment and was opened in 1982.

He died in April 2022, at the age of 99.
