= Darling's Observatory =

Observatory in Minnesota, US

- Organization: Private
- Location: Duluth, Minnesota (United States)
- Coordinates: 46°46′47″N 92°06′47″W
- Altitude: 283 meters (928 feet)
- Established: 1917
- Closed: 1972

Telescopes
- Unnamed Telescope: 9-inch Brashear refractor

Darling's Observatory, built from 1916 to 1917, was a private observatory built by J. H. Darling in Duluth, Minnesota. The site of the observatory was on West 3rd Street between 9th and 10th avenues in Duluth and sat about 325 feet above Lake Superior (927 feet above sea level). Plans for the building were drawn by Richard E. Schmidt of Garden & Martin of Chicago. The blueprints for the steel dome were prepared by Darling himself after inspecting domes from various other observatories. The wooden building had a stucco exterior finish.

In 1965, the University of Minnesota Duluth (UMD) took possession of the observatory's Telescope, where it remains on display. In 1972, the building, which had been repeatedly vandalized, was demolished.

== Telescopes ==
The observatory contained a 9-inch refracting telescope made by William Gaertner & Company of Chicago, Illinois. Soon after Darling placed the order, Gaertner & Co. replied that they were unable to obtain glass for the lens because of limited supplies during World War I. However, John A. Brashear Pittsburgh, Pennsylvania manufacturer of some of the World's finest optical instruments, had on-hand a nine-inch objective, which Darling was able to obtain. The telescope was completed and set up in April 1917 at a cost at about $3,500.

The Marshall W. Alworth Planetarium, located at the UMD, is now the home of Darling's Telescope.

== See also ==
- List of astronomical observatories
