= W. T. Bailey =

American logger

William Thomas Bailey (September 22, 1842 - March 31, 1914) was a 19th and 20th century lumberman from Duluth, Minnesota.

== Early life ==
W. T. Bailey was born in Baylysboro, Ontario on September 22, 1842 to James Joseph and Catherine C. Bailey of England (James) and Canada (Catherine). After gold was discovered in California, James Joseph set out in search of gold and was never heard from again. It is believed he met a violent end.

By the age of 10, William Thomas was an orphan. Bailey took a job in the railroad industry to support himself, which he became the purchasing agent for Northwestern Railroad which was headquartered in Chicago, Illinois.

== Personal life ==
On June 25, 1873, William Bailey married Rebecca Roberts of Michigan (daughter of Richard and Rebecca Roberts of Ottawa, Michigan). Richard Roberts was a prominent lumberman himself. Together, William T. Bailey and Rebecca Bailey had three children: William Thomas Jr., Richard Robert, and Rebecca Bailey. All the family members were involved with the lumber mill, and they all held stock within the company.

In 1955, Rebecca (Bailey) Raley (daughter of W. T. Bailey) sued for liquidation of the company claiming that Richard Robert and other officials had fraudulently failed to inform her that the company was being reorganized. She stated the corporation failed; therefore the corporation should have been dissolved and the assets distributed.

Bailey considered himself a Republican that belonged to the Presbyterian Church. He was affiliated with the Masonic Order & local lodge and was a member of the Independent Order of the Odd Fellows. He was a man deeply devoted to home and family.

=== Death ===
William T. Bailey died on Tuesday, March 31, 1914, at 10 a.m. CST in Rochester, Minnesota the age of 72. The Virginia Enterprise (now known as The Mesabi Daily News) reported on that day that W.T. had died due to surgical complication after undergoing kidney surgery for acute kidney problems.

W. T. had gone to meet with Dr. William James Mayo and Dr. Charles Horace Mayo of the Mayo Clinic in Rochester, Minnesota a few weeks prior to the operation. After the operation, William's health declined quickly and was declared dead the following morning.

The funeral was set to be held at the family home at 1317 East 1st Street, Duluth, Minnesota on Thursday, April 2, 1914, at 2:00 p.m. CST. Dr. Yost, pastor of the First Presbyterian Church of Duluth presided the event. Honorary pallbearers were Charles d'Autremont, B.F. Smith, A.B. Wolvin, and John Williams. Active pallbearers were Robert Whitesides, Daniel Healy, Frank Smith, Richard M. Sellwood, William Orr, and W. I. Prince. The interment was set for Forest Hill Cemetery in Duluth.
