= Gerald Gustafson =

American fighter pilot (1928–2024)

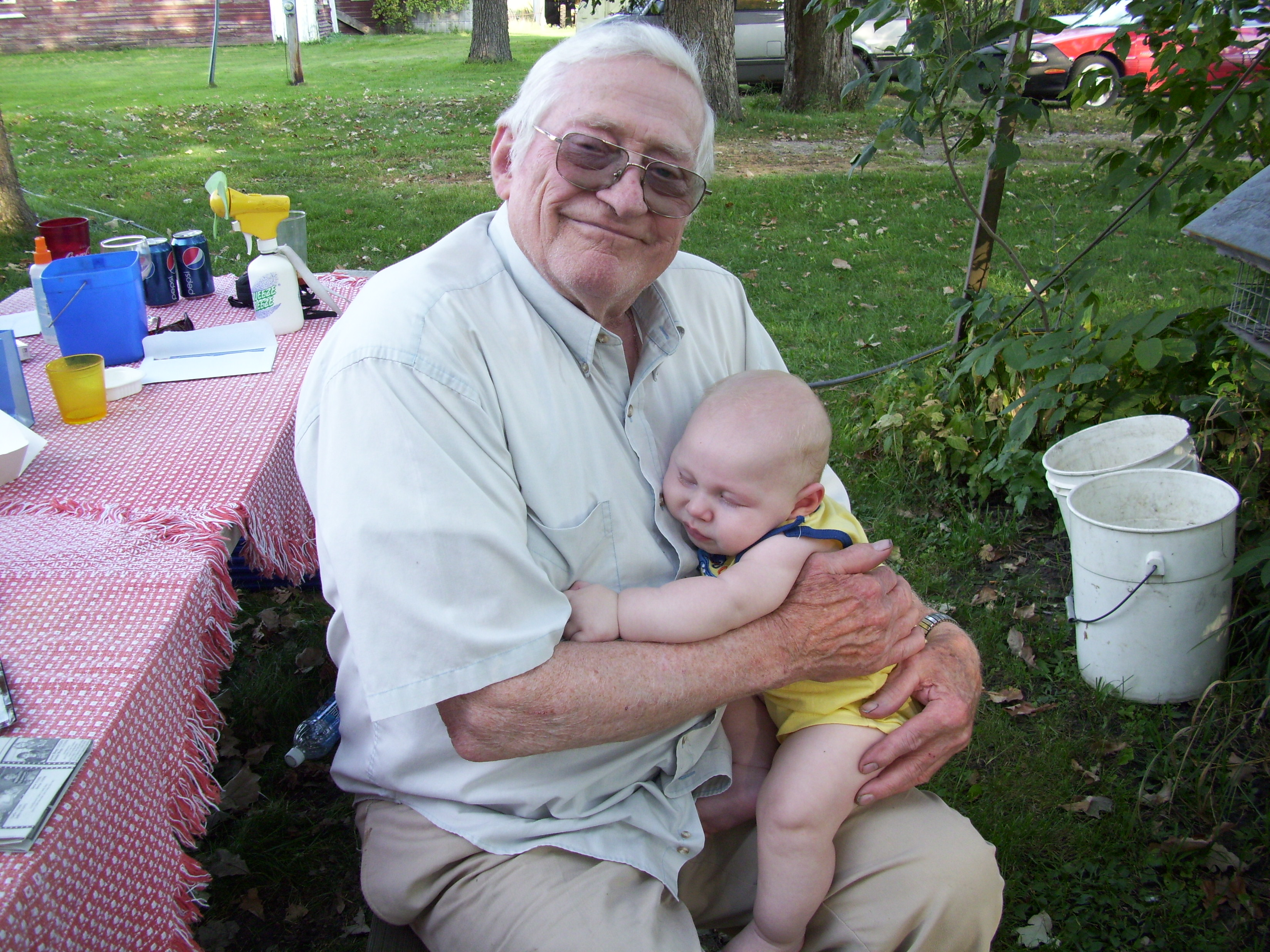
- Gustafson in 2009
- Born: September 14, 1928; New Ulm, Minnesota, U.S.
- Died: March 1, 2024 (aged 95); Mankato, Minnesota, U.S.
- Burial place: Fort Snelling National Cemetery, Minneapolis, U.S.
- Military career
- Allegiance: United States of America
- Branch: United States Air Force
- Service years: 1950–1978
- Rank: Colonel
- Nickname: Gus
- Unit: 333rd Tactical Fighter Squadron
- Commands: Air Force ROTC detachment (University of Maryland)
- Conflicts: Vietnam War
- Awards: Air Force Cross; Distinguished Flying Cross (3); Purple Heart; Meritorious Service Medal; Air Medal (11)

Gerald Clayton Gustafson (September 14, 1928 – March 1, 2024) was an American fighter pilot during the period after World War II. His most notable achievements came during the Vietnam War, where he was awarded the Air Force Cross.

== Early life ==
Gustafson was born in New Ulm, Minnesota, in 1928. His grandparents were Swedish immigrants and his father, Herbert C. Gustafson was an artilleryman in France during World War I. Both parents were offspring of Swedish immigrants. In the early part of his life he lost the tip of his right index finger in a farming accident. Later on his flying career was almost ended because the Air Force considered it a "missing digit" but later changed its classification to a "terminal digit."

== Air Force service ==
Gustafson initially joined the Air Force in 1950 and after completing basic training in Texas was trained in the use of bombardier equipment on the B-26. After completing his training and missing service in the Korean War, he was approved for a new pilot program and trained in Piper Cub and T-6 Texan. He received advanced fighter training in the P-80 Shooting Star.

After his officer and flight training, Gustafson was stationed in Wisconsin; Thule Air Base, Greenland; Texas; and California. During this time he flew F-86D Sabre, F-102, and F-106 Delta Dart.

Immediately before his Vietnam service, he was cross-trained in the F-105 Thunderchief out of Nellis AFB. After his service in Vietnam, he flew F-105 out of Okinawa Japan.

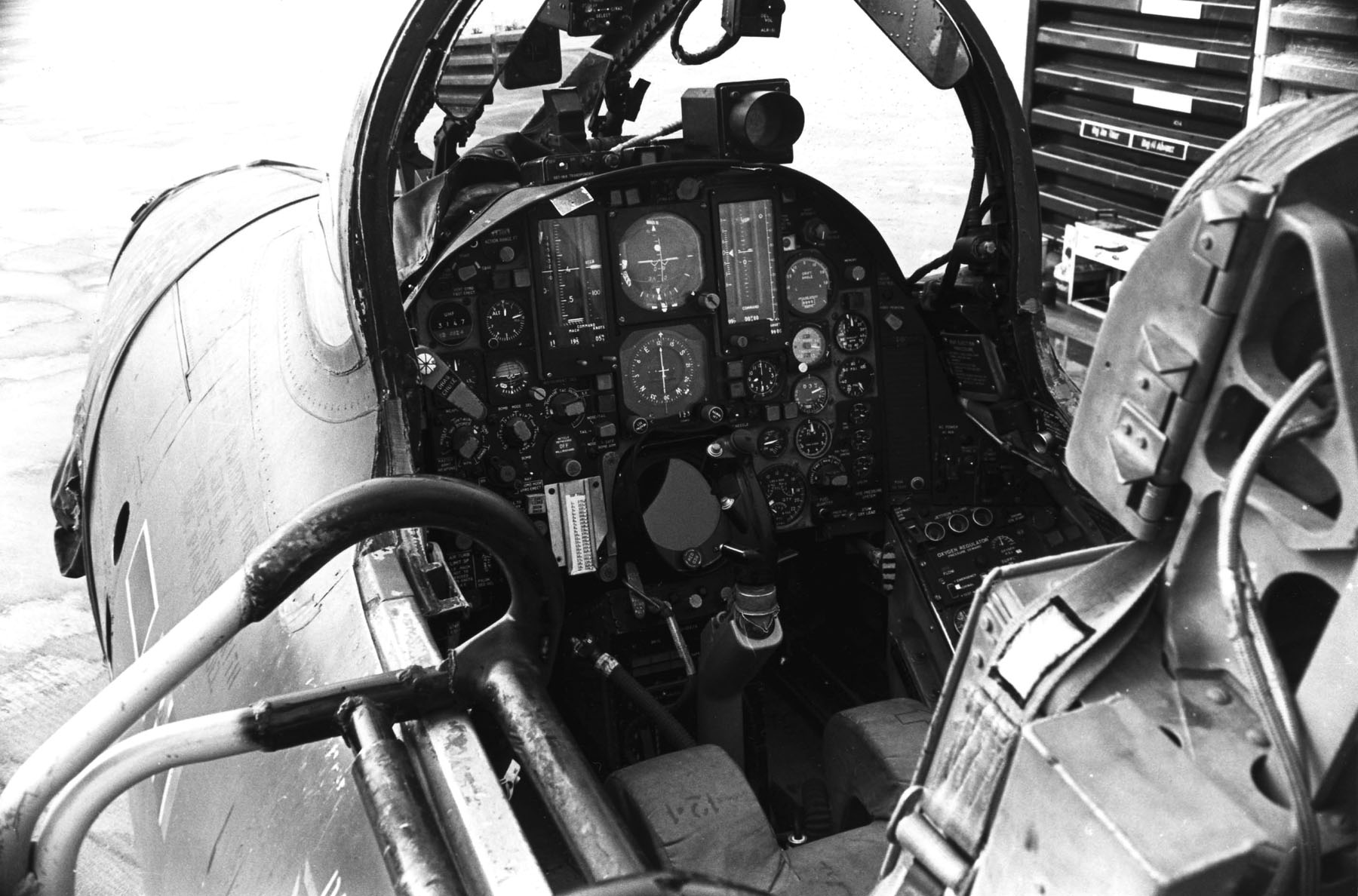
The cockpit of a F-105D Thunderchief

== Air Force Cross ==
Gerald Gustafson won the Air Force Cross, the second highest award for gallantry in the United States Air Force, during the Vietnam War. He flew F-105 Thunderchiefs from Takhli Royal Thai Air Force Base in Thailand and was shot down on two occasions.

Gustafson was awarded the medal in November, 1967. His citation noted that "The President of the United States of America, authorized by Title 10, Section 8742, United States Code, awards the Air Force Cross to Major Gerald C. Gustafson for extraordinary heroism in military operations against an opposing armed force as an F-105 Aircraft Commander over North Vietnam on November 19, 1967. On that date, Major Gustafson's aircraft was severely damaged by a surface-to-air missile while he was assisting another pilot who had received battle damage and had been wounded. Major Gustafson refused to leave his comrade until other escort aircraft could be vectored in to give the wounded pilot assistance in reaching his home base safely. Only then, did Major Gustafson egress to a safer area where he was forced to eject from his own stricken aircraft. Through his extraordinary heroism, superb airmanship, and aggressiveness, Major Gustafson reflected the highest credit upon himself and the United States Air Force."

Gustafson along with Lieutenant Colonel Robert W. Smith and Major Bruce Stocks all received Air Force Crosses for the same mission on November 19, 1967.

== Post-Air Force ==
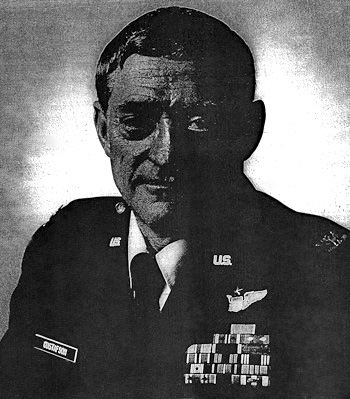
Col. Gustafson during Pentagon Service

After Vietnam, Gustafson was put off of flying duty due to an injury which left his eye unable to dilate properly. He was transferred first to attend at the National War College, then worked at the Pentagon. He retired with the rank of Colonel in 1979 to New Richland. Gustafson was actively involved in the VFW, the Red River Valley Fighter Pilots Association, and the Air Force Association. He often spoke to students and classes about his experiences.

Gustafson died of old age in Mankato, Minnesota, on March 1, 2024, at the age of 95.

== Awards and decorations ==

Command Pilot
Air Force Cross		Distinguished Flying Cross with Valor device and two bronze oak leaf clusters
Purple Heart	Meritorious Service Medal	Air Medal with two silver oak leaf clusters
Air Force Commendation Medal	Air Force Presidential Unit Citation with two bronze oak leaf clusters	Air Force Outstanding Unit Award with Valor device
Combat Readiness Medal	Army Good Conduct Medal	National Defense Service Medal with service star
Armed Forces Expeditionary Medal	Vietnam Service Medal with three bronze campaign stars	Air Force Longevity Service Award with silver oak leaf cluster
Small Arms Expert Marksmanship Ribbon	Vietnam Gallantry Cross Unit Citation	Republic of Vietnam Campaign Medal
