= John Gustavson =

Swedish politician (1890–1949)

John Gustavson (1890–1949) was a Swedish politician. He was a member of the Centre Party.
