= Henry Louis Morin =

American politician (1899–1949)

Henry Louis Morin (July 11, 1899 – September 19, 1949) was an American farmer, labor union activist and politician.

Morin was born in Duluth, Minnesota and was involved with the local labor union movement and the National Federation of Postal Clerks. He also owned a truck farm. Morin served in the Minnesota Senate from 1923 to 1924. He died suddenly in Duluth, Minnesota from a heart attack while attending the Minnesota Convention of Labor convention in Duluth Minnesota.
