= Edward Ernest Swanstrom =

American prelate

His Excellency, The Most Reverend Edward Ernest Swanstrom
- Auxiliary Bishop of New York; Titular Bishop of Arba
- Church: Roman Catholic Church
- See: Archdiocese of New York
- Other posts: Titular Bishop of Arba

Orders
- Ordination: June 2, 1928 by Thomas Edmund Molloy
- Consecration: October 28, 1960 by Pope John XXIII, Diego Venini and Benigno Carrara

Personal details
- Born: March 20, 1903 New York City, US
- Died: August 10, 1985 (aged 82) New York City
- Education: Fordham University; New York School of Social Work

Edward E. Swanstrom (March 20, 1903 – August 10, 1985) was an American prelate of the Roman Catholic Church. He served as an auxiliary bishop of the Archdiocese of New York from 1960 to 1978.

Swanstrom served as the national director of Catholic Relief Services from 1947 to 1976.

== Biography ==
=== Early life ===
Edward Swanstrom was born on March 20, 1903, in New York City to Gustave and Mary (Cronin) Swanstrom. Edward Swanstrom graduated from Fordham University in the Bronx with a Bachelor of Arts degree in 1924. While at Fordham he was a member of the varsity track team, captaining it his senior year. He studied for the priesthood at St. John's Seminary in Brooklyn.

=== Priesthood ===
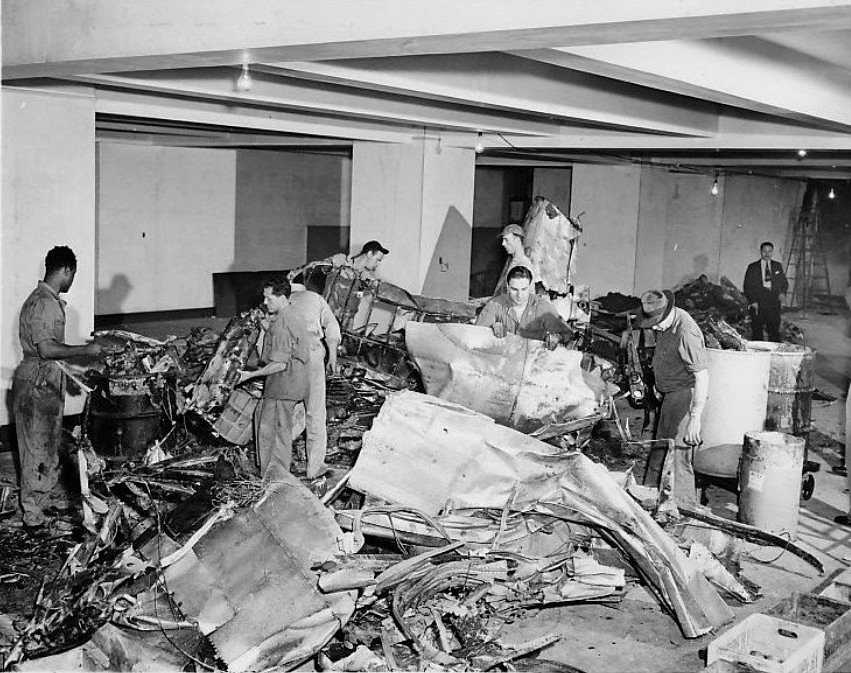
CRS office destroyed in 1945 crash of bomber into the Empire State Building in Manhattan

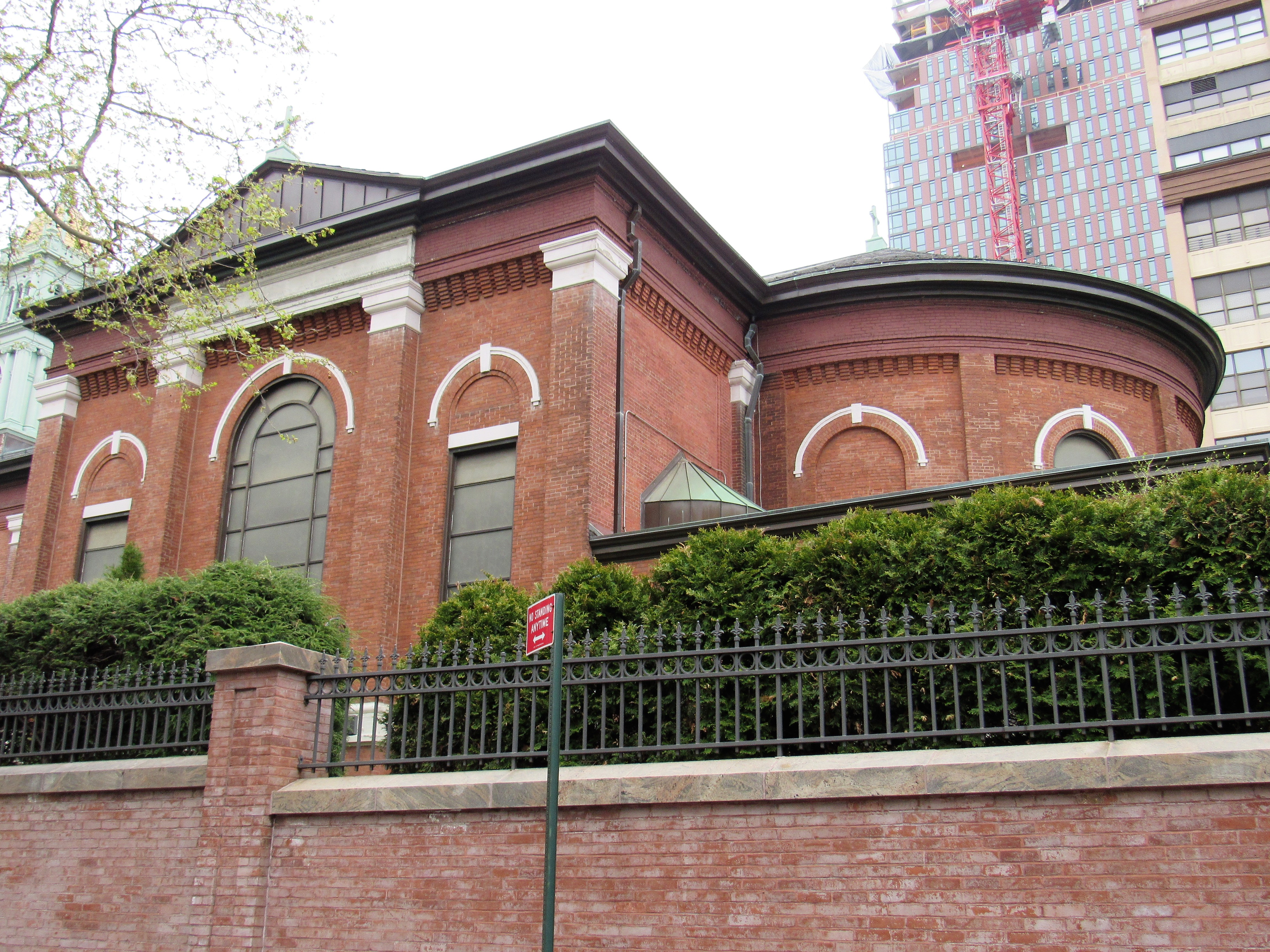
Cathedral Basilica of St. James, Brooklyn, New York (2017)

Swanstrom was ordained a priest of the Diocese of Brooklyn by Bishop Thomas Edmund Molloy on June 2, 1928 in Brooklyn. Swanstrom earned a Master of Arts degree in social work from the New York School of Social Work in Manhattan in 1933 and a Doctor of Political Philosophy degree from Fordham in 1938. His doctoral dissertation concerned the problems of waterfront laborers in Brooklyn.

Swanstrom was curate at St. James Pro-Cathedral in Brooklyn from 1934 to 1960. He took on additional responsibilities as assistant diocesan director of Catholic Charities from 1933 to 1943, assistant executive director of Catholic Relief Services (CRS) from 1943 to 1947, and finally as executive director of CRS from 1947 to 1976.

In 1945, a B-25 Mitchell bomber of the US Army Air Corps accidentally crashed into the Empire State Building in Manhattan, destroying the CRS office there. Swanstrom's secretary was killed. Swanstrom was in the building lobby when the plane hit; he went upstairs to deliver sacraments to the dying.

=== Auxiliary Bishop of New York ===
In 1960, Swanstrom was appointed auxiliary bishop of New York by Pope John XXIII. He was consecrated by the pope at St. Peter's Basilica in Rome on October 28, 1960. He also served as pastor of St. Andrew's Church in New York City from 1965 to 1973 while remaining executive director of Catholic Relief Services.

With American involvement in the Vietnam War, CRS began substantial operations in Southeast Asia. Swanstrom and CRS were heavily criticized by the Catholic Peace Fellowship (CPF) for concentrating their efforts in what was then South Vietnam. In 1967, CPF alleged that CRS' single largest food distribution program was being used by the U.S. and South Vietnamese governments as a pay program for South Vietnamese militiamen and their families. If so, said the CPF, Catholic Relief Services was merely an agent of American governmental policy rather than an impartial provider of needed services to the Vietnamese people.

In November 1967, Swanstrom stated that CRS was providing funding for humanitarian supplies to North Vietnam. Swanstrom in 1976 set up a special CRS fund to aid earthquake victims around Udine, Italy. The Vatican named him an assistant to the papal throne in 1977.

=== Death and legacy ===
Swanstrom retired on March 20, 1978 and lived in New York City. He died at Lennox Hill Hospital in Manhattan on August 10, 1985, at age 82. He held honorary degrees from Catholic University, Iona College in New Rochelle, New York, and St. John's University in Queens.

== Publications ==
- The Waterfront Labor Problem: A Study in Decasualization and Unemployment Insurance (1938) Fordham University Press, New York
- Pilgrims of the Night: A Study of Expelled Peoples (1950) Sheed and Ward, New York
