= Armand Gutheim =

Swedish composer

- Origin: Sweden
- Website: armandgutheim.com

Armand Gutheim is a Swedish composer. Until 2011, he was director of the Dansfestival Västmanland, a dance festival in Västmanland.
