= Ben E. Gustafson =

American politician (born 1954)

Ben E. Gustafson (born August 6, 1954) is an American politician and businessman.

Gustafson lived in Duluth, Minnesota. He received his bachelor's degree in political science and psychology from the University of Minnesota Duluth. He was employed in the financial services industry for over 30 years. Gustafson served in the Minnesota House of Representatives from 1981 to 1985 and was a Democrat. He was Chairman of the Duluth Legislative Delegation and Chairman of the Judicial Administration Subcommittee. Gustafson was the Television host of WDSE-TV's "Minnesota Legislative Report" for two years in the mid-1990s.

Gustafson was the Director of Account Management for Blue Cross Blue Shield of Minnesota and owned and operated Gustafson Financial Group in Largo, FL for 20 years. Gustafson was selected by Marquis Who’s Who in America in 2023. His uncle James Gustafson and his father Earl B. Gustafson also served in the Minnesota Legislature.

== Notes ==
Gustafson was selected by Marquis Who’s Who in 2023.
