= Dwight A. Swanstrom =

American politician (1905–1978)

Dwight A. Swanstrom (April 28, 1905 – August 26, 1978) was an American businessman and politician.

Swanstrom was born in Duluth, Minnesota and graduated from Denfeld High School, Duluth, in 1923. He served in the Minnesota National Guard. Swanstrom went to the Hibbing Community College, in Hibbing, Minnesota and then his bachelor's degree in economics and political science from the University of Minnesota. He lived with his wife and family in Duluth and was involved in the insurance and real estate businesses. Swanstrom served in the Minnesota House of Representatives from 1945 to 1954 and from 1965 to 1972. He died at a hospital in Duluth, Minnesota.
