= Earl B. Gustafson =

American judge, lawyer, and politician (1927–2018)

Earl B. Gustafson (September 27, 1927 – April 16, 2018) was an American judge, lawyer, and politician.

Gustafson was born in Duluth, Minnesota and graduated from Central High School in Duluth, Minnesota, in 1945. he served in the United States Navy during World War II. Gustafson received his bachelor's degree in business and economics from Gustavus Adolphus College in 1950 and his law degree from the University of Minnesota Law School in 1954. He practiced law in Duluth, Minnesota. Gustafson served in the Minnesota House of Representatives from 1963 to 1967 and from 1969 to 1971. He was a Democrat. Gustafson then served in the Minnesota Senate in 1971 and 1972. Gustafson served on the Minnesota Tax Court from 1973 to 1995 and was chief judge of the tax court in 1993 and 1994. Gustafson died in Minneapolis, Minnesota from dementia. His brother James Gustafson and his son Ben E. Gustafson also served in the Minnesota Legislature.
