= James Gustafson (politician) =

American politician (1938–2014)

James "Jim" Gustafson
- Born: September 8, 1938
- Died: July 23, 2014 (aged 75); Duluth, Minnesota
- Occupations: Politician, Businessman
- Known for: Serving in the Minnesota Senate

James "Jim" Gustafson (September 8, 1938 – July 23, 2014) was an American politician and businessman.

From Duluth, Minnesota, Gustafson received his bachelor's degree in history and economics from Ohio Wesleyan University. He served in the United States Marine Corps Reserves. He worked in the family business A&E Supply Company in Duluth. Gustafson served on the Duluth City Council and planning commission. From 1982 to 1995, Gustafson served in the Minnesota Senate as a Republican. His brother Earl B. Gustafson and his nephew Ben E. Gustafson also served in the Minnesota State Legislature. He died in Duluth, Minnesota.
