= Aurora, Minnesota =

City in Minnesota, United States

- City
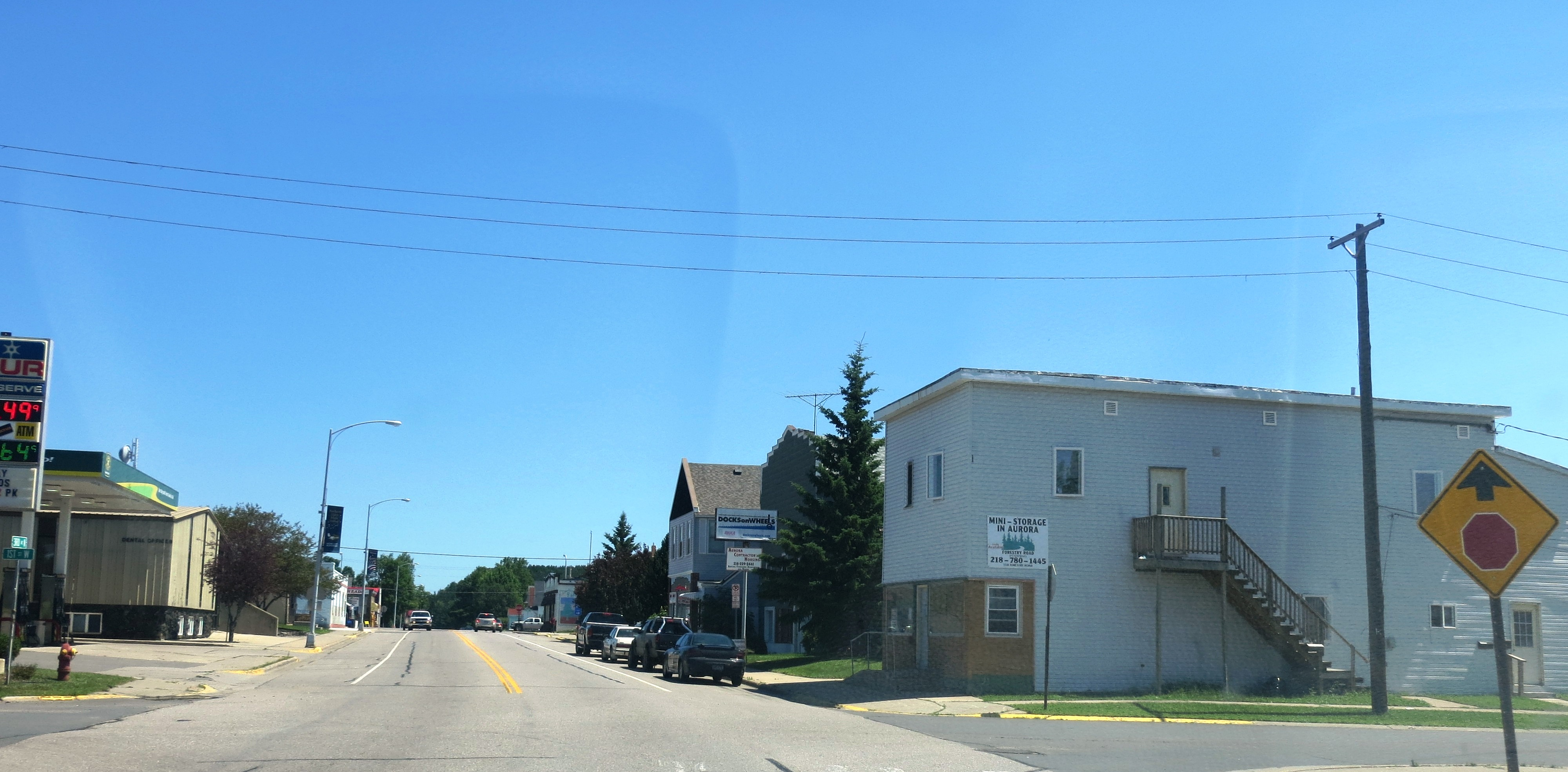
- Photo: Erlend Bjørtvedt

- Logo
- Motto: "Minnesota's Star of the North"
- Location of the city of Aurora within St. Louis County, Minnesota
- Coordinates: 47°32′N 92°14′W
- Country: United States
- State: Minnesota
- County: Saint Louis

Government
  - Mayor: Doug Gregor

Area
  - Total: 3.91 sq mi (10.13 km^{2})
  - Land: 3.69 sq mi (9.57 km^{2})
  - Water: 0.22 sq mi (0.56 km^{2})
- Elevation: 1,470 ft (450 m)

Population (2020)
  - Total: 1,678
  - Density: 453.9/sq mi (175.27/km^{2})
- Time zone: UTC−6 (Central (CST))
  - Summer (DST): UTC−5 (CDT)
- ZIP Code: 55705
- Area code: 218
- FIPS code: 27-02872
- GNIS feature ID: 0660700
- Website: www.aurora-mn.com

Aurora is a city in St. Louis County, Minnesota, United States. The population was 1,678 at the 2020 census.

Saint Louis County Highways 100 and 110 and Minnesota State Highway 135 are three of the main routes in Aurora.

== History ==
Aurora was laid out in 1898. A post office has been in operation at Aurora since 1903. The city was incorporated in 1903.

== Geography ==
According to the United States Census Bureau, the city has a total area of 3.86 square miles (10.00 km^{2}); 3.74 square miles (9.69 km^{2}) is land and 0.12 square miles (0.31 km^{2}) is water. Aurora is surrounded by mixed coniferous/deciduous forest and is near many lakes.

== Economy ==
Aurora is on northeastern Minnesota's Mesabi Range. This area produced a large quantity of the nation's iron and taconite ore.

== Arts and culture ==
=== Annual cultural events ===
The Northern Lights Music Festival, based in Aurora, is one of Minnesota's largest summer festivals, presenting professional opera, chamber music, symphonic music and lectures to Iron Range audiences, including Ely, Aurora, Tower, Gilbert, Virginia, Buhl, Chisholm and Hibbing, utilizing historic venues across the Range. The historic B'nai Abraham Synagogue is owned by NLMF, and chamber music events are presented there, in the city of Virginia. The festival begins on July 1 each year, and also includes the NLMF Young Artists Program and the NLMF Opera Apprentice program.

== Parks and recreation ==
Aurora is on the edge of the Superior National Forest, two miles (3 km) from Giants Ridge Golf and Ski Resort. Popular recreational activities include hunting, fishing, boating, four-wheeling, skiing, and snowboarding. There are many ATV and snowmobile trails on Aurora's outskirts, some of which extend all the way to Lake Superior.

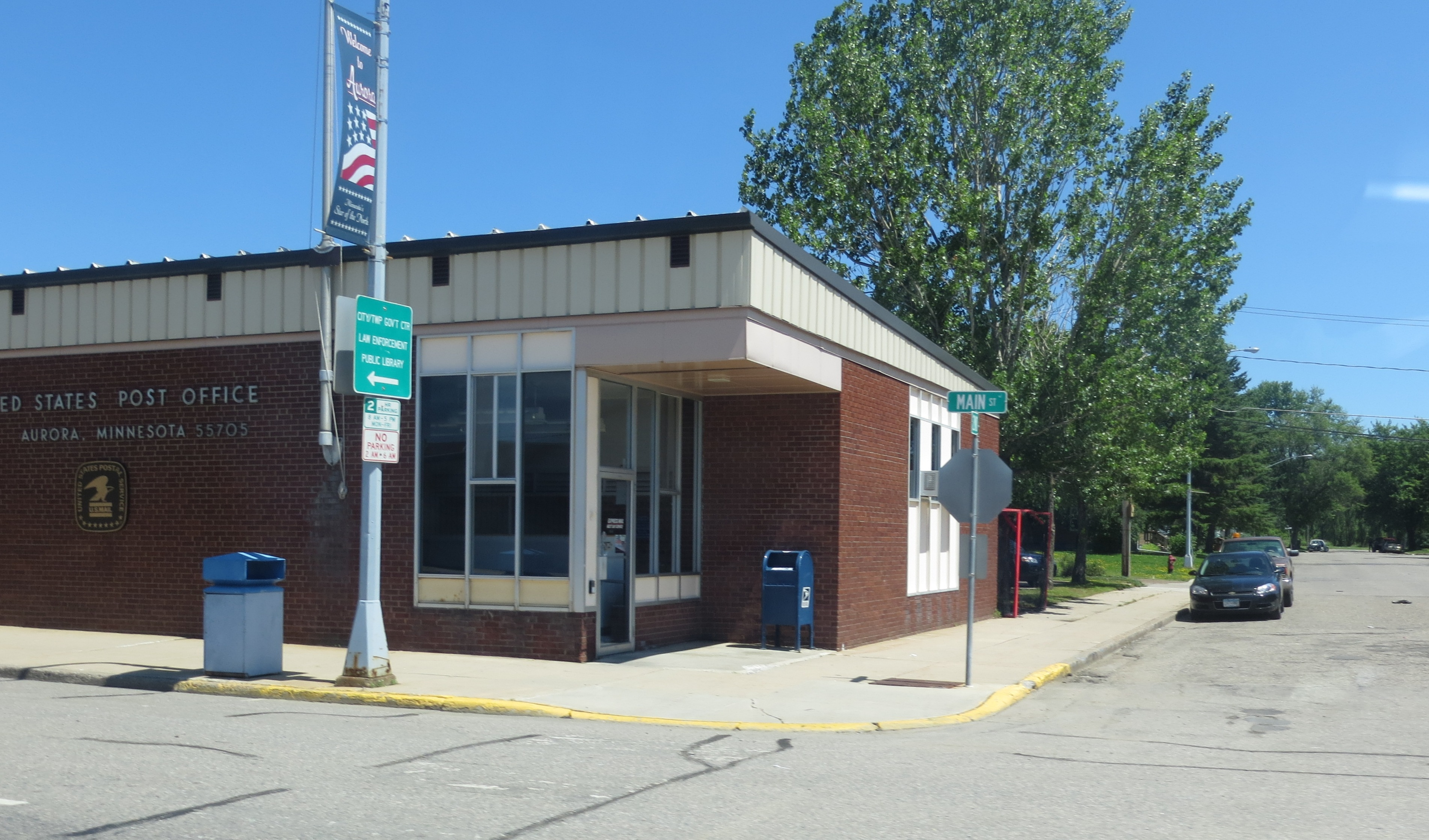
Aurora Post Office

== Demographics ==
Historical population
Census	Pop.	Note	%±
1910	1,919		—
1920	2,809		46.4%
1930	1,463		−47.9%
1940	1,528		4.4%
1950	1,371		−10.3%
1960	2,799		104.2%
1970	2,531		−9.6%
1980	2,670		5.5%
1990	1,965		−26.4%
2000	1,850		−5.9%
2010	1,682		−9.1%
2020	1,678		−0.2%
U.S. Decennial Census; 2013 Estimate

=== 2020 census ===
As of the 2020 census, Aurora had a population of 1,678. The median age was 48.4 years. 18.1% of residents were under the age of 18 and 27.8% of residents were 65 years of age or older. For every 100 females there were 94.4 males, and for every 100 females age 18 and over there were 92.0 males age 18 and over.

0.0% of residents lived in urban areas, while 100.0% lived in rural areas.

There were 763 households in Aurora, of which 20.7% had children under the age of 18 living in them. Of all households, 35.6% were married-couple households, 24.6% were households with a male householder and no spouse or partner present, and 30.9% were households with a female householder and no spouse or partner present. About 39.2% of all households were made up of individuals and 19.3% had someone living alone who was 65 years of age or older.

There were 863 housing units, of which 11.6% were vacant. The homeowner vacancy rate was 2.7% and the rental vacancy rate was 8.6%.

Racial composition as of the 2020 census
Race	Number	Percent
White	1,577	94.0%
Black or African American	9	0.5%
American Indian and Alaska Native	13	0.8%
Asian	3	0.2%
Native Hawaiian and Other Pacific Islander	0	0.0%
Some other race	4	0.2%
Two or more races	72	4.3%
Hispanic or Latino (of any race)	17	1.0%

=== 2010 census ===
As of the census of 2010, there were 1,682 people, 777 households, and 438 families living in the city. The population density was 449.7 inhabitants per square mile (173.6/km^{2}). There were 887 housing units at an average density of 237.2 per square mile (91.6/km^{2}). The racial makeup of the city was 98.2% White, 0.2% African American, 0.5% Native American, 0.1% Asian, and 1.0% from two or more races. Hispanic or Latino of any race were 0.5% of the population.

There were 777 households, of which 24.1% had children under the age of 18 living with them, 41.3% were married couples living together, 11.2% had a female householder with no husband present, 3.9% had a male householder with no wife present, and 43.6% were non-families. 37.8% of all households were made up of individuals, and 18.1% had someone living alone who was 65 years of age or older. The average household size was 2.09 and the average family size was 2.70.

The median age in the city was 48.4 years. 19.3% of residents were under the age of 18; 6.7% were between the ages of 18 and 24; 20.2% were from 25 to 44; 29.5% were from 45 to 64; and 24.4% were 65 years of age or older. The gender makeup of the city was 48.9% male and 51.1% female.

=== 2000 census ===
As of the census of 2000, there were 1,850 people, 812 households, and 495 families living in the city. The population density was 487.4 inhabitants per square mile (188.2/km^{2}). There were 893 housing units at an average density of 235.3 per square mile (90.8/km^{2}). The racial makeup of the city was 98.38% White, 0.05% African American, 0.43% Native American, 0.38% Asian, 0.05% from other races, and 0.70% from two or more races. Hispanic or Latino of any race were 0.32% of the population. 17.4% were of Finnish, 13.2% German, 10.5% Norwegian, 9.1% Slovene, 7.3% Swedish, 6.6% Italian and 5.4% English ancestry according to Census 2000.

There were 812 households, out of which 22.2% had children under the age of 18 living with them, 48.6% were married couples living together, 8.4% had a female householder with no husband present, and 39.0% were non-families. 34.6% of all households were made up of individuals, and 17.4% had someone living alone who was 65 years of age or older. The average household size was 2.19 and the average family size was 2.79.

In the city, the population was spread out, with 19.8% under the age of 18, 7.2% from 18 to 24, 22.6% from 25 to 44, 26.4% from 45 to 64, and 23.9% who were 65 years of age or older. The median age was 45 years. For every 100 females, there were 95.6 males. For every 100 females age 18 and over, there were 93.4 males.

The median income for a household in the city was $32,094, and the median income for a family was $43,095. Males had a median income of $41,413 versus $20,625 for females. The per capita income for the city was $17,442. About 8.5% of families and 11.9% of the population were below the poverty line, including 26.0% of those under age 18 and 4.7% of those age 65 or over.

== Infrastructure ==
=== Transportation ===
State Highway 135 (MN 135), County Highway 100, and County Highway 110 are three of the main routes in Aurora.

== Notable people ==
- Frederick A. Cina was born in Aurora in 1908. He was a lawyer and served as a Minnesota state representative.
- Frozen food magnate Jeno Paulucci was born in Aurora in 1918. Paulucci is famous for inventing the brands Chun King, Jeno's Pizza, Jeno's Pizza Rolls, Michelina's, Bundino's and many others.
- Actress Francine York was born in Aurora to Sophie and Frank Yerich and moved to Hollywood, California to star in productions such as The Doll Squad, Curse of the Swamp Creature, plus several films with Jerry Lewis and Elvis Presley and countless TV shows including Perry Mason, Burke's Law and Lost in Space.
