= Takis =

Mexican brand of flavored rolled tortilla chips

- Product type: Tortilla chip
- Current owner: Barcel (subsidiary of Grupo Bimbo)
- Country: Mexico
- Introduced: 1999
- Markets: Mexico; Argentina; Brazil; Canada; United States; United Kingdom; European Union and the rest of European countries; Japan; Middle East and Africa; Australia; New Zealand Morocco
- Tagline: Face The Intensity; Are you Takis enough? Throw some Takis in it Takis are seriously Intense
- Website: https://takis.us/ (USA)

Takis is a Mexican brand of flavored rolled tortilla chips produced by Barcel, a subsidiary of Grupo Bimbo. First sold in Mexico in 1999 as Taquis, the brand was renamed to Takis in 2004. Barcel originally intended to aim Takis toward the Hispanic demographic, but its popularity quickly spread. The snack was introduced to the United States in 2001 and Canada in 2015.

Takis chips come in numerous flavors, the best selling of which is the chili-lime "Fuego" flavor, sold in distinctive purple bags, introduced in 2006. The shape of Takis is fashioned after the taquito. Besides the rolled corn chips, Takis produces other snacks with the same flavor lines, including different potato chip varieties, corn "stix", and big peanuts.

== Flavors ==
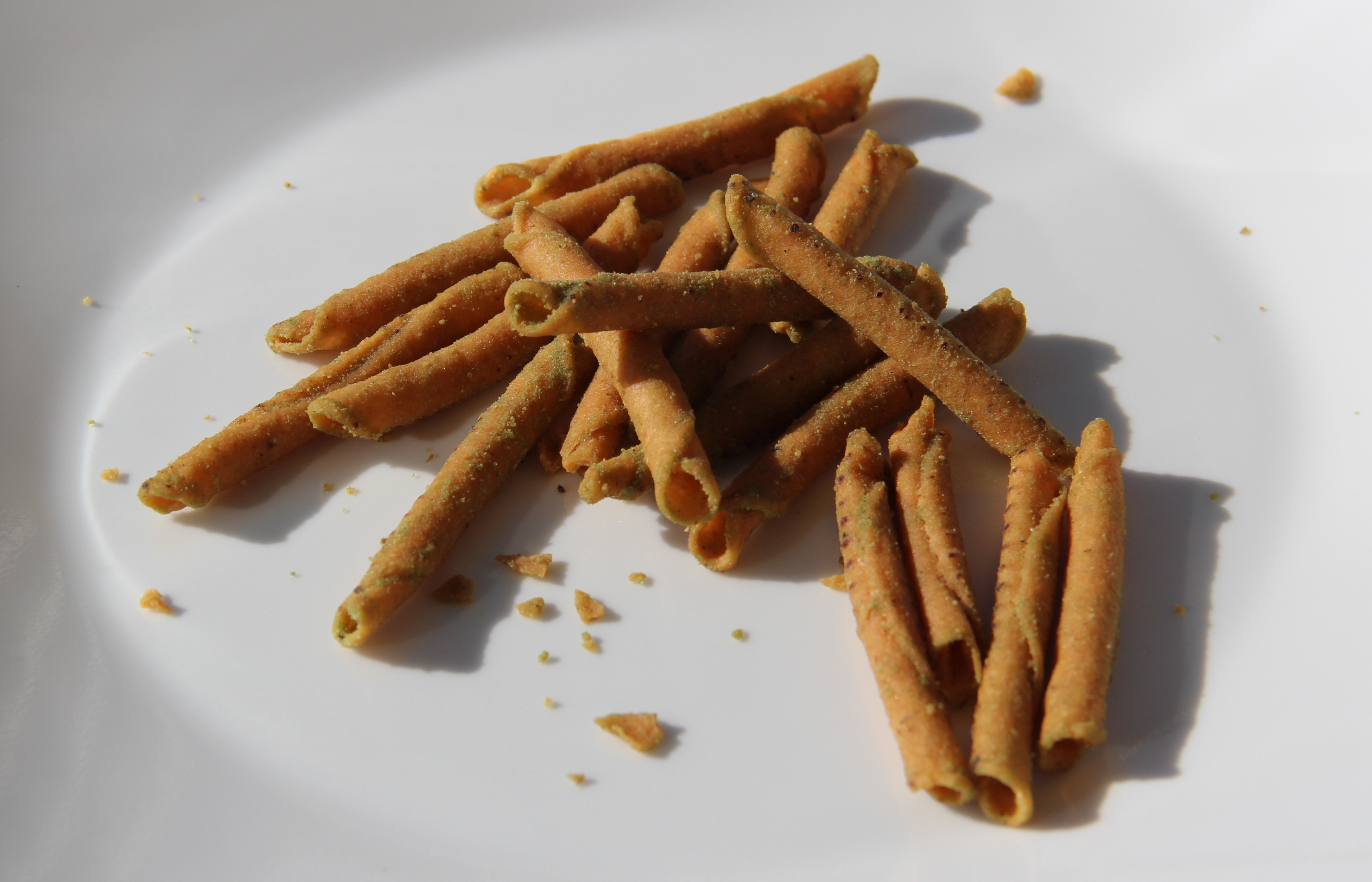
Fuego (left) and Guacamole-flavored (right) Takis.

Takis are prepared in a variety of flavors, which includes:

- Angry Burger, a spicy hamburger and dill pickle flavor (green packaging)
- Authentic Taco, introduced as early as 2001 under the "Taquis" name, a hot taco flavor (green packaging)
- BBQ Blast, a savory barbecue flavor, non-spicy. (brown packaging)
- BBQ Picante, a spicy barbecue flavor (brown packaging)
- Blue Flame, an extreme barbecue flavor (blue packaging)
- Blue Heat, a hot chili pepper flavor (blue packaging)
- Buckin' Ranch, a non-spicy ranch sauce flavor (light blue packaging)
- Crazy Buffalo, a medium-heat, tangy buffalo sauce flavor (orange/black packaging)
- Chile Limón, a medium-heat tangy chili lime flavor (yellow/green packaging)
- Churro Charge, a limited edition cinnamon sugar flavor released for the 2024 holiday season (pink/magenta packaging)
- Cobra, a Worcestershire sauce flavor (red packaging)
- Crunchy Fajitas, introduced in 2007, a chicken fajita flavor with a yellowish appearance (green packaging)
- Dragon Sweet Chili, a sweet and spicy flavor with a dull red-orange appearance (purple and black packaging)
- Fuego, a hot chili pepper and lime (fruit) flavor. Introduced in 2006, it is the spiciest of all varieties, as well as the most popular flavor (purple packaging).
- Fuego azul, a spicy snack topped with a blue mystery spice powder, with a similar taste to Fuego. This flavor was released in the U.S. in 2019 as Blue Heat (blue packaging).
- "Fuego Duos", a mixed-snack chili-lime and sweet watermelon flavor (split purple-pink packaging)
- Guacamole, introduced in 2007, a spicy snack topped with a style of salsa guacamole (white packaging)
- "Hot Honey", a sweet and spicy honey chili flavor (golden yellow packaging)
- Intense Nacho, a non-spicy cheese flavor and the first ever non-spicy flavor of Takis (orange packaging)
- Kaboom, a ketchup and sriracha flavor (purple, red and white packaging)
- Lava, a cheese and chipotle flavor (orange packaging)
- Mexican Mingle, a tingly chili and tomato flavor. Introduced in 2007 and discontinued in 2008
- Nacho Xplosion, a spicy nacho-cheese flavor (purple and orange packaging)
- Ninja Teriyaki, a spicy teriyaki flavor
- Nitro, introduced in 2010, a habanero chili flavor (black-red packaging)
- Original, a slightly spicy snack (green packaging)
- Outlaw, a spicy barbecue flavor (dark red packaging)
- Party, A mildly spicy flavor of cheese and chili, known in Europe and the UK as "Volcano" (purple & orange packaging)
- Rock, a presentation with flavor of chorizo
- Sal De Mar (formerly "Classic"), a mild snack topped with sea salt
- Salsa Brava, a slightly spicier snack than the original (yellow packaging)
- Scorpion BBQ, a barbecue flavor (brown and purple packaging)
- Titan, a chipotle and lime flavor (dark red packaging)
- Volcano Queso, a habanero cheese flavor (yellow-green and orange packaging)
- Wild, a hot buffalo flavor (sky blue packaging)
- Xplosion, introduced in 2015, a spicy cheese-flavored and chili pepper variety (orange packaging)
- Xtra Hot, introduced in 2013, a hot flavor similar to Fuego, but less spicy (black-purple packaging)
- Zombie, habanero and cucumber flavor (black-green packaging)

== Other products ==
In July 2020, Razor released their scooter designed with the Takis brand. Also in that month, Totino's released Totino's Takis Fuego Mini Snack Bites, consisting of pizza rolls covered in Takis Fuego seasoning. In October 2020, Takis introduced Takis Hot Nuts, featuring peanuts in a crunchy shell coated with Takis seasoning. Its flavors include Fuego, Flare and Smokin' Lime. In 2021, Grupo Bimbo expanded the Takis snack portfolio to include:

- Takis Waves, ridged potato chip
- Takis Watz, cheese snack
- Takis POP!, ready-to-eat popcorn (distinguishable from Popcornopolis branded Takis popcorn, Grupo Bimbo owns both)
- Takis Stix, corn snack stick
- Takis Crisps, potato chip shaped like Pringles
- Takis Kettlez, kettle-cooked potato chip snack
- Takis Hot Nuts, peanuts coated in crunchy corn snack
- Takis Chippz, thin-cut potato chips
- Takis Mix, a variety containing several types of other Takis snacks, such as Takis rolls, stix, popcorn, and wheat snacks similar to chicharrones
- Takis Duos, a variety meant to combine two distinct flavors into one bag, such as Fuego rolls and chili watermelon popcorn
- Takis Fuego Lollipops, strawberry hard candy coated in chili powder
- Takis Sunflower Seeds, roasted shell-on sunflower kernels
- Takis Meat Sticks, jerky-styled meat rods

== Promotion ==
In 2021 Takis ran a promotion with Fortnite Youtuber and Streamer Ninja

In 2026 Takis collabarated with Marvel Studios on the newest installation of the Spider Man series "Brand New Day." The movie featured multiple moments of Peter Parker (played by Tom Holland) holding various taki bags and/or taki variants displayed in the background. the Fuego and Blue heat Taki flavors also had advertisements for the movie displayed on the bags.
