= Totino =

Totino is an Italian surname. Notable people with the surname include:

- Rose Totino (1915–1994), American frozen pizza company co-founder
- Jim Totino (1911–1981), American frozen pizza company co-founder and husband of Rose Totino
  - Totino-Grace High School, an American Catholic high school named in their honor
  - Totino's, an American brand of frozen pizza products currently owned by General Mills
- Salvatore Totino (born 1964), American cinematographer
