= Demaco extruder =

Pasta extruder

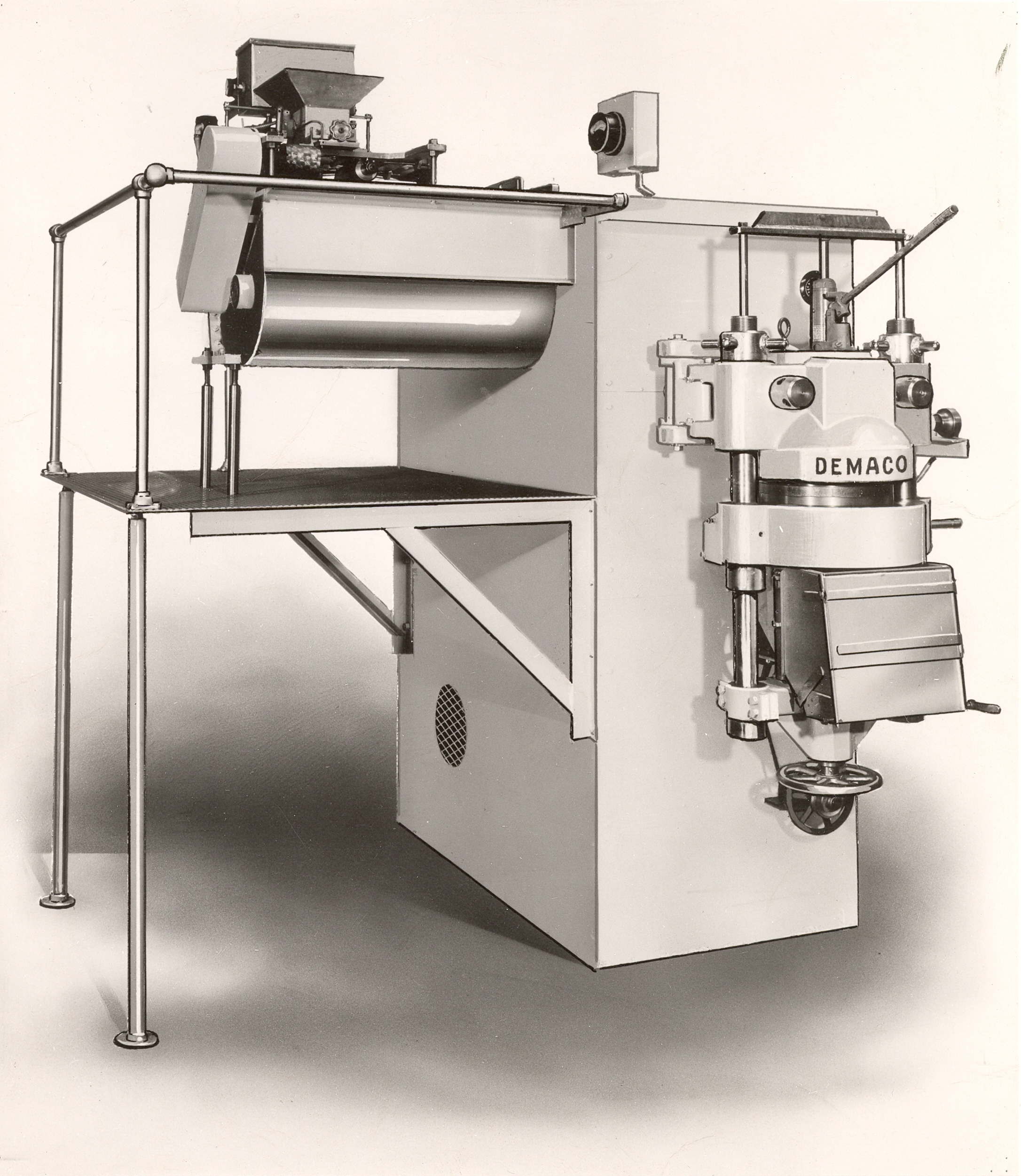
Demaco extruder from 1958

The Demaco extruder is a pasta extruder built by Demaco in West Melbourne, Florida, United States. It is the first pasta extruder ever built for USDA sanitary food plants. Its design allowed food producers to use an extruder directly in fresh, frozen and canning factories.

== History ==
The extruder evolved from a mechanical pasta press first built in 1914. The mechanical version was replaced by a hydraulic version shortly thereafter.

Containing an auger screw and mixer, the extruder combined the functions of mixing, kneading and extruding in one machine, operations that formerly required three machines.

In the 1960s, the extruder underwent a series of changes that made it easy to sanitize and suitable for USDA food plants. These included a streamlined design with quick disassembly, and stainless steel construction with completely sealed welds. Demaco engineers also designed a premixer for the extruder, which received a U.S. patent in 1975. In the 1980s, the Demaco extruder became automated with PLC controls.

The DEMACO extruder is used to make a wide range of products, including pasta and cereal. Additionally, DEMACO extruders are used to make some snacks, such as crisps and pizza rolls.

== Canned goods ==
An innovative use of the extruder was feeding a can-filling machine for canned products. Demaco extruders also feed ravioli machines to make canned ravioli products. The U.S. Chinese-food company Chun King used one for the production of egg rolls.
