= Totino's =

American brand of frozen pizza

Totinos
- Product type: Frozen pizza and pizza products
- Current owner: General Mills
- Country: United States
- Introduced: 1951; 75 years ago (Totino's); 1968; 58 years ago (Jeno's)
- Markets: Worldwide
- Previous owners: Rose and Jim Totino (Totino's); Jeno's Inc. (Jeno's); Pillsbury Company
- Website: www.totinos.com

Totino's is an American brand of frozen pizza products owned by General Mills, best known for their pizza rolls. Totino's was founded as a restaurant in the 1950s in Minneapolis, Minnesota, which expanded to frozen foods in the 1960s. They also operate the Jeno's brand.

== History ==
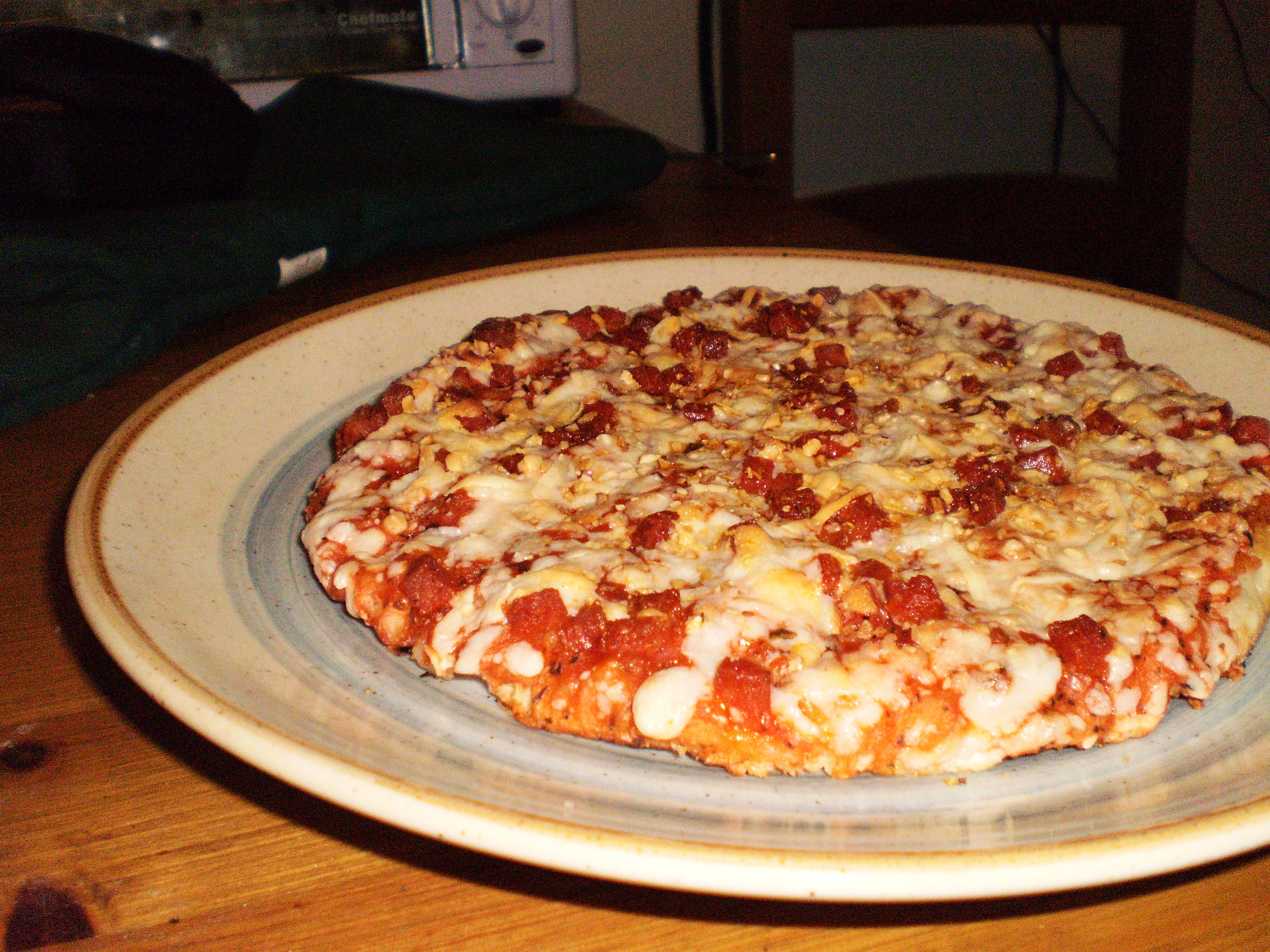
Totino's pepperoni pizza

Rose and Jim Totino founded Totino's Italian Kitchen, a take-out pizzeria in Minneapolis, Minnesota, on February 7, 1951. After customers regularly tried to eat in the store, they expanded to a full-service restaurant, which relocated to Mound's View in 2008, before closing in 2011.

Totino's expanded into frozen-pizza manufacturing during the 1960s, initially selling frozen pastas from their restaurant before transitioning to pizza production. This shift began in 1961 with the purchase of a plant in St. Louis Park, Minnesota. Following the plant purchase and the start of production in January 1962, the company initially faced losses. However, in the fall of 1962, they transitioned to purchasing pre-made frozen pizza crusts and shifted their focus to the tomato sauce, meats, and cheeses. This change successfully turned the company profitable by 1963.

In 1970, they built a larger-capacity plant in Fridley. The Totinos sold their frozen pizza business to the Pillsbury Company in 1975, where Rose Totino was named as vice-president. After the acquisition, Rose Totino helped develop a new in-house crust and the brand grew nationwide. By the 1970s, they were the top-selling frozen pizza in the United States. Totino-Grace High School in Fridley was renamed after the brand's founders in 1980.

Separately, Jeno Paulucci developed a series of food businesses starting in the late 1940s, including the Chun King line of Chinese foods. After selling Chun King in 1966, he founded Jeno's Inc. in 1968, where cook and product developer Beatrice Ojakangas developed pizza rolls, a type of egg roll filled with pizza ingredients. The first pizza roll flavor was cheese. In 1985, Paulucci sold his Jeno's Pizza Rolls brand to Pillsbury for $135 million.

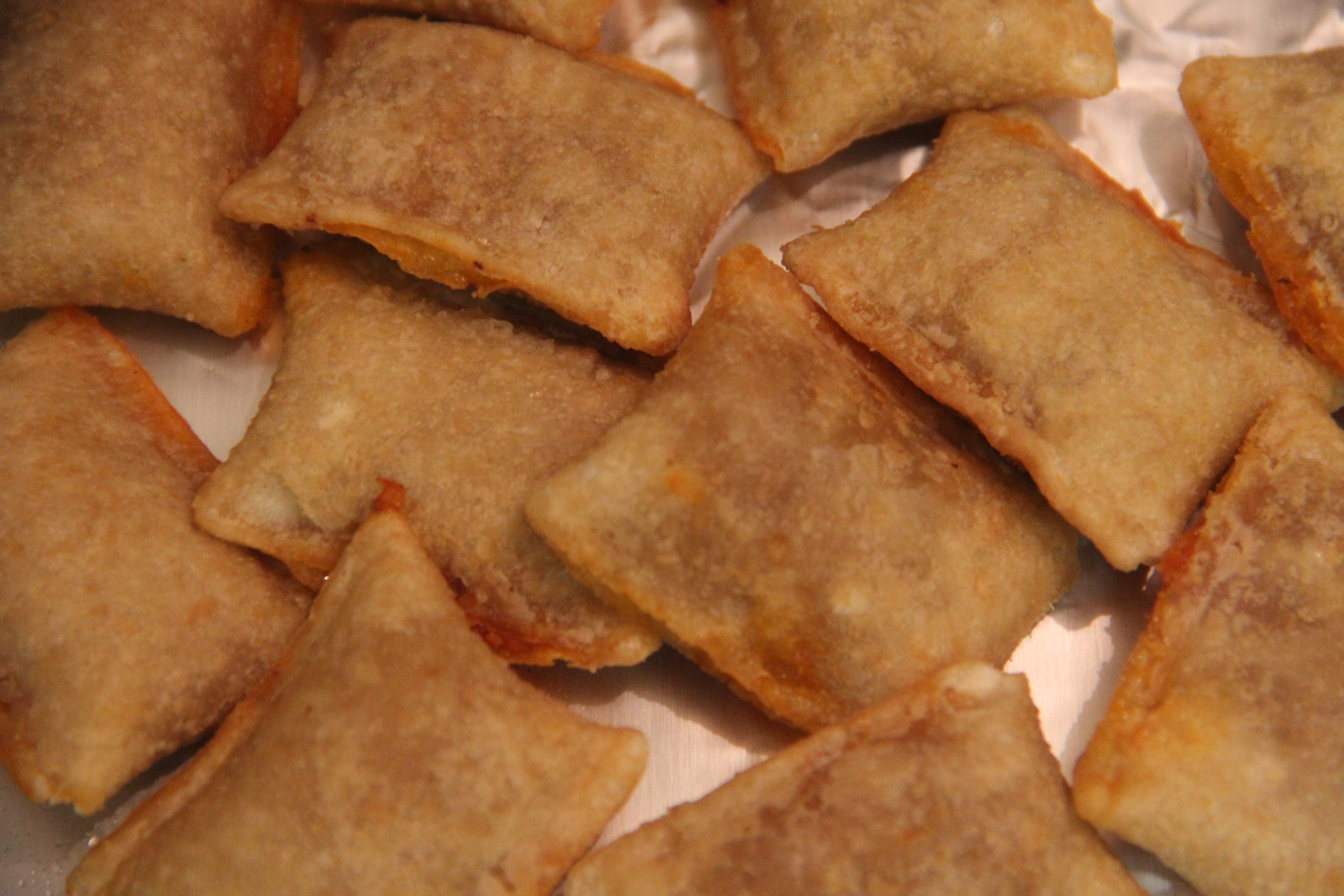
Totino's pizza rolls

The Jeno's line of pizza rolls was rebranded as Totino's in 1993. Totino's was acquired by General Mills with its purchase of Pillsbury in 2001.

== Health and nutrition issues ==
On November 1, 2007, Totino's and Jeno's brand pizza were recalled for E. coli contamination.

Totino's products historically contained cheese substitutes made with hydrogenated oil. Totino's products have been criticized for their high amount of trans fat and sodium. In 2011, Consumer Reports rated Totino's as "only fair for nutrition" because of "high total fat and trans fat and low fiber." Packaging on Totino's brand pizza now indicates 0 trans fats per serving.

== In pop culture ==
Saturday Night Live featured a popular series of ad parodies for Totino's Pizza Rolls in the 2010s, starring Vanessa Bayer.

== See also ==
- List of frozen food brands
