= Beatrice Ojakangas =

American cookbook author (born 1934

- Born: Beatrice Luoma; 1934 (age 91–92); Cedar Valley Township, St. Louis County, Minnesota, United States
- Education: University of Minnesota Duluth
- Occupations: Cook, cookbook author, writer, television cook
- Known for: Writing a number of cookbooks on Scandinavian cooking, inventing pizza rolls
- Spouse: Richard Ojakangas
- Honors: James Beard Foundation's Cookbook Hall of Fame; Knight of the Order of the White Rose of Finland

Beatrice Ojakangas (née Luoma; born 1934) is an American cookbook author, writer, television cook, and inventor of pizza rolls, from Floodwood, Minnesota. Of Finnish heritage, Ojakangas has focused on Nordic and Scandinavian cooking, and particularly preserving its culinary traditions in the United States. She has been referred to as the "Scandinavian Julia Child". As of 2016, she has written 30 cookbooks. In 2005 she was inducted into the James Beard Foundation's Cookbook Hall of Fame for The Great Scandinavian Baking Book. She also received the Knight of the Order of the White Rose honor from the Finnish government at the 2026 FinnFest USA.

== Biography ==
Beatrice Luoma grew up in a Finnish American family in Cedar Valley Township, Minnesota, near Floodwood. The oldest of ten children, she learned Finnish at church and home. She grew up on a farm and found an interest in cooking at a young age. She was encouraged to experiment in the kitchen – as long as she cleaned up afterward. Her interest in food led her to refine her baking skills over the course of several years in order to win the 4-H contest at the county fair. While attending the University of Minnesota Duluth, she met her husband Richard Ojakangas; she studied home economics, graduating in 1956. The following year, she won second grand prize in the Grand National Bake-Off. The family lived in Finland for a year, where she taught American cooking to Finnish women for the U.S. Information Service. While giving demonstrations, she also learned more about Finnish recipes from the women she taught. The family then moved to California; her writing career began there at Sunset magazine, where she was a food editor. While working for Sunset, Ojakangas wrote her first book, The Finnish Cookbook, which was published in 1964 and was later described by the University of Minnesota as "the absolute source on Finnish cooking in the United States". The book remains in print.

Returning to Minnesota, in the mid-1960s Ojakangas worked as a product developer and home economist for Minnesota food industry magnate Jeno Paulucci's Chun King, which sold American Chinese food. Her younger brother also worked there as an engineer and had developed a machine for producing egg rolls. When Paulucci wanted to find new uses for the egg roll wrapping machine, Ojakangas was given the responsibility. She started with a list of over 50 possibilities, many of them sandwich flavors such as peanut butter and jelly, cheeseburger, or Reuben. Some of her other ideas were various pizza flavors like Italian sausage or pepperoni. Her taste test of the pizza rolls for Paulucci and Chun King executives was well received, and Jeno's Pizza Rolls soon became popular.

In the 1960s and 1970s, Beatrice and Richard Ojakangas founded and ran a restaurant in Duluth, Minnesota, called Somebody's House. It featured 36 types of "Scandinavian-style open-face ground beef patty with a variety of toppings." The Minneapolis Star first covered her in its Taste column in 1978 and would go on to publish a number of profiles on her over the following decades.

Ojakangas has written at least 30 cookbooks, and also published her memoirs, Homemade, in 2016.

=== Media ===
Ojakangas has written for a number of nationwide American magazines such as Ladies' Home Journal, Southern Living, and Bon Appétit as well as worked as a columnist for the Minneapolis Star Tribune. She has also worked in the food industry as a consultant for companies such as Pillsbury and Louis Kemp Foods.

Ojakangas hosted the Food Network's 1997 program The Baker's Dozen. In addition, she has been a regular guest on Martha Stewart Living, a featured guest on Julia Child's Baking with Julia, and has been on Finnish cooking shows.

== Awards and honors ==
Her book Scandinavian Feasts received the Minnesota Book Award in the Cuisine category in 1993. In 2005 Ojakangas was inducted into the James Beard Foundation's Cookbook Hall of Fame. She was awarded an honorary doctorate degree by the University of Minnesota Duluth in 2007 and received the Distinguished Alumni Award. In 2016 Ojakangas was inducted into the Scandinavian-American Hall of Fame and received the Northeastern Minnesota Book Award in the Memoir category the same year. Ojakangas was made a Knight of the Order of the White Rose of Finland in 2026.

Cooking Light listed her book The Best Casserole Cookbook Ever among its Top 100 Cookbooks.

== Works ==
- The Finnish Cookbook (1964)
- Gourmet Cooking for Two (1970)
- Introducing Mehu-Maija (meh-hoo-my-yah) from Finland (1976)
- Food Processor Bread Book (1980)
- Convection Oven Cookbook (1980)
- The Best of the Liberated Cook (1981)
- Sourdough (1981)
- Scandinavian Cooking (1983)
- Great Whole Grain Breads (1984)
- Fantastically Finnish: Recipes and Traditions (1985)
- New Ideas for Casseroles (1985)
- Great Old-Fashioned American Desserts (1987)
- Great Old-Fashioned American Recipes (1988)
- Country Tastes: Best Recipes from America's Kitchens (1988)
- The Great Scandinavian Baking Book (1988)
- The Best of Wild Rice Recipes (1989)
- Light Desserts (1989)
- The Best of Pancake & Waffle Recipes (1990)
- The Best of Honey Recipes (1991)
- Quick Breads: 65 Recipes for Bakers in a Hurry (1991)
- Scandinavian Feasts: Celebrating Traditions Throughout the Year (1992)
- Pot Pies (1993)
- The Book of Regional American Cooking: Heartland (1993)
- Beatrice Ojakangas' Great Holiday Baking Book (1994)
- Light Muffins: Over 60 Recipes for Sweet and Savory Low-Fat Muffins and Spreads (1995)
- Beatrice Ojakangas' Light and Easy Baking (1996)
- Whole Grain Breads by Machine or Hand (1998)
- Cooking with Convection (2005)
- The Best Casserole Cookbook Ever (2008)
- Petite Sweets: Bite-Sized Desserts to Satisfy Every Sweet Tooth (2009)
- Weeknight Desserts: Quick & Easy Sweet Treats (2010)
- The Soup & Bread Cookbook (2013)
- Homemade: Finnish Rye, Feed Sack Fashion, and Other Simple Ingredients from My Life in Food (2016)
- Breakfast with Beatrice: 250 Recipes from Sweet Cream Waffles to Swedish Farmer's Omelets (2018)
