= Jeno Paulucci =

American businessman (1918–2011)

- Born: July 5, 1918; Aurora, Minnesota
- Died: November 24, 2011 (aged 93)
- Occupation: Businessperson

Luigino "Jeno" Francesco Paulucci (July 5, 1918 – November 24, 2011) was an American food industry magnate, investor, and philanthropist. Paulucci started over 70 companies; his most well-known ventures included the frozen food company Bellisio Foods as well as food products such as pizza rolls and the Chun King line of Chinese foods.

== Early life ==
A self-described "peddler from the Iron Range", Paulucci was born in the mining town Aurora, Minnesota. Paulucci's parents, Ettore and Michelina, had recently moved from Bellisio Solfare, a hamlet of Pergola (Marche) Italy and his father was a miner in one of the region's iron mines. Paulucci graduated from Hibbing High School and attended Hibbing Junior College. He began his long career in the grocery industry while working for his family's small grocery store during the Great Depression. On February 8, 1947, Paulucci married Lois Mae Trepanier. They had three children together.

== Career ==
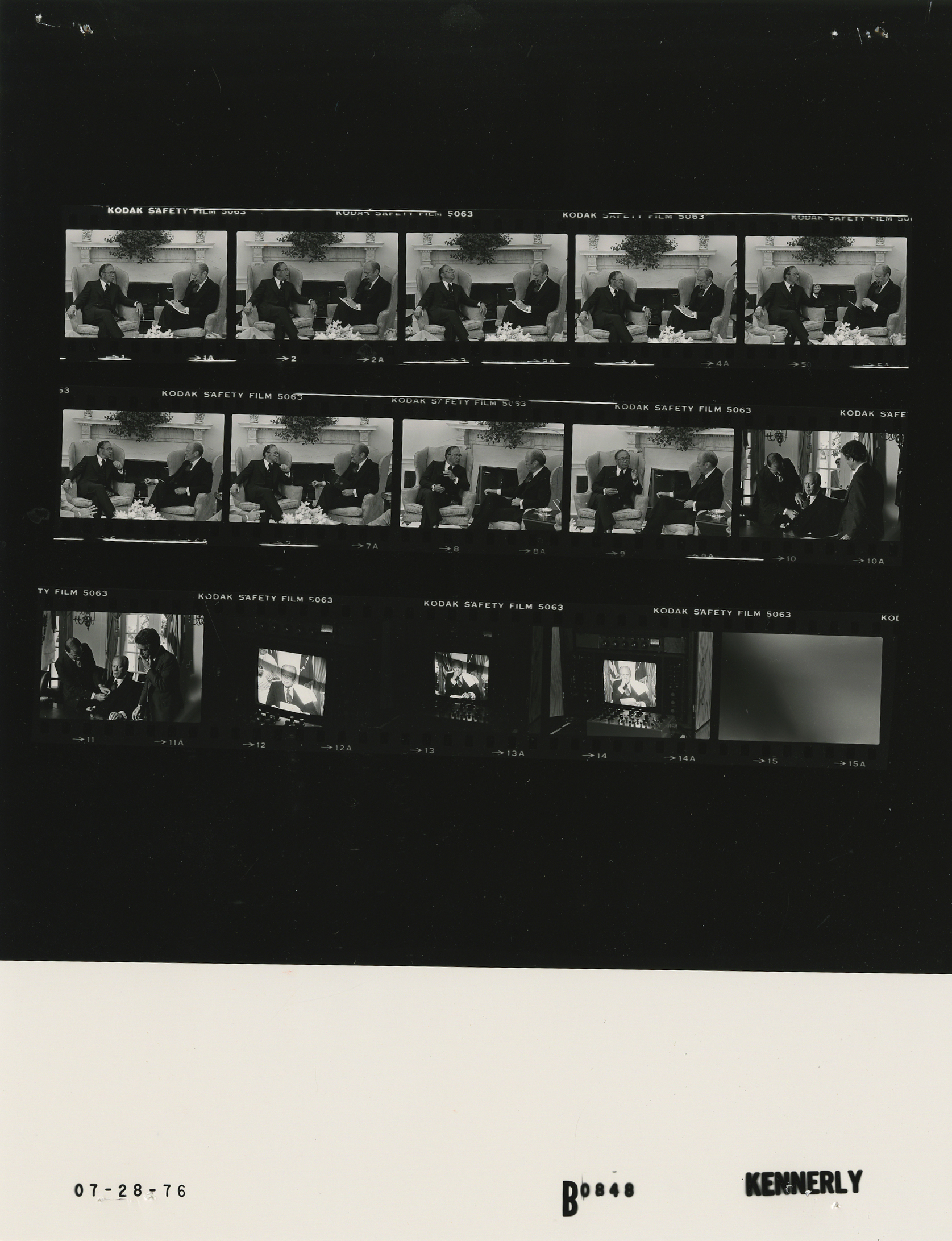
Contact sheet of photographs showing Paulucci seated with President Gerald Ford in 1976

During the 1940s, Paulucci developed the Chun King line of canned Chinese food products. In the 1972 book The Very, Very Rich and How They Got That Way, by Max Gunther, Paulucci was quoted as stating his motivation that, while he loved Chinese food, he found it too bland and thought it would benefit from a little Italian spicing. After making a batch and canning it, he took some samples to a supermarket executive to convince him to try it out, and to persuade him to stock it. On opening the can, Paulucci found, to his horror, that the top of the can's contents included a whole, cooked grasshopper. Fortunately, the can had been opened in such a way that the lid was facing the executive, so that only Paulucci could see the contents. Thinking quickly, Paulucci told the executive, "This looks so good, I'm going to taste it myself". He then took one of two spoons that were lying on the table, reached into the can, quickly dug out a heaping spoonful (which included the grasshopper) and ate it. (According to Paulucci, "It didn't taste bad." Roasted or deep-fried grasshoppers are a popular street snack in Mexico City.) He then offered the can to the executive, who sampled a separate spoonful, liked it, and placed a large order.

His version of Chinese food was heavily modified to better cater to the food preferences of European immigrants and Americans of similar ethnic origins with the addition of Italian spices. Paulucci's company became so successful selling canned chow mein and chop suey that President Gerald Ford quipped, "What could be more American than a business built on a good Italian recipe for chop suey?" when praising Paulucci's accomplishments with Chun King.

By 1962, Chun King was bringing in $30 million in annual revenue and accounted for half of all U.S. sales of prepared Chinese food. Looking for new uses for his egg roll wrapping machine, product developer and cook Beatrice Ojakangas created the pizza roll in the mid-1960s. Chun King was sold to R. J. Reynolds tobacco company, in 1966 for $63 million. In 1985, Paulucci sold his Jeno's Pizza Rolls brand to Pillsbury. He later regretted selling the pizza rolls, saying, "I should’ve kept the pizza roll. It's something that’ll damn near live forever." In the early 1990s, Paulucci returned to northeast Minnesota to launch Luigino's, Inc., a frozen food company specializing in Italian food such as pasta marketed under the Michelina's brand named after Paulucci's mother. Paulucci was a game show contestant on CBS's What's My Line in 1963. He was also featured on the television show Lifestyles of the Rich and Famous with Robin Leach.

Paulucci started Paulucci Publications in 1979 with the launch of his magazine for Italian Americans, Attenzione. In January 1981, The New York Times reported that Paulucci's magazine "had survived 19 issues in an area where others could not make it to six". Leda Sanford, the magazine's editor-in-chief and publisher, said "patience and a lot of money" was required to make the magazine succeed. Paulucci sold Attenzione to Adam Publications in January 1982. Sanford reported that Paulucci had put $6 million into the publication.

Describing himself as an "incurable entrepreneur," Paulucci advocated several innovative strategies for building small businesses. From the 1940s to the 1960s, his Chun King company attempted to "cut out the middle man" and "take advantage of waste". Paulucci preferred not to use personal money for his businesses and instead relied on public financing provided in exchange for job creation. Paulucci was also credited with building one of the first national brands of frozen pizzas and taking advantage of the growing acceptance of frozen food as a meal. Paulucci told a reporter, "Wherever there's a microwave, I believe we should have our product."

In the 1980s, Paulucci planned and developed the master-planned community of Heathrow, Florida. Since the 1980s, Paulucci owned numerous land holdings in Seminole County, Florida, and was an active philanthropist in the community.

== Charity and philanthropy ==
Paulucci was involved with numerous charitable causes. He was a prominent advocate for Italian-American issues. He founded the National Italian American Foundation in the 1970s and served as a presidential emissary to Italy. The Paulucci Space Theater, a planetarium in Hibbing, Minnesota, is named in honor of Paulucci. The exhibition hall in the Duluth Entertainment Convention Center was dedicated to Jeno on April 24, 1967.

== Controversy ==
In 1982, Paulucci moved 1,200 jobs from Jeno's Pizza plant in Duluth, Minnesota, to Jackson, Ohio. The state of Ohio had offered Paulucci publicly financed low-interest loans. Many accused Paulucci of violating his professed commitment to northeast Minnesota during a time of economic hardships. In response to these criticisms, Paulucci told Minnesota Public Radio, "I'm a businessman, I'm not going to say, 'Oh gee, I'm a nice guy.'"

Paulucci and his daughter began a legal battle in 2006 over guardianship of his daughter's substantial trust fund.

After his death, a significant court battle erupted over his $100M estate.
