= Tutino =

Tutino is an Italian surname. Notable people with the surname include:

- Gennaro Tutino (born 1996), Italian footballer
- Kayla Tutino (born 1992), Canadian women's ice hockey player
- Marco Tutino (born 1954), Italian classical composer

== See also ==
- Totino
