= Demaco =

American pasta equipment manufacturer

Coordinates: 28°8′7.93″N 80°39′59.83″W

DEMACO
- Industry: Manufacturing
- Predecessor: Consolidated Macaroni Machine Corporation
- Founded: 1914; 112 years ago
- Headquarters: Melbourne, Florida, United States
- Area served: Worldwide
- Products: Pasta machinery
- Website: Demaco website

Demaco was founded in 1914 making it the oldest pasta equipment manufacturer in the United States and the only one that makes industrial capacity machines in America. In the 1960s, Demaco pioneered the sanitary extruder for washdown food plants.

== History ==
Originally located in Brooklyn, New York, the company moved its headquarters to Melbourne, Florida in 1998, which is where it is today. The company became Consolidated Macaroni Machine Corporation in 1926 and changed the name to Demaco in 1952.

In World War II, Consolidated made tooling for the Norden bombsight, Grumman aircraft fighter wings and Worthington pumps as part of the war effort. In the late 1930s, DEMACO introduced and patented an automated spaghetti spreader with a continuous drive and trim handling system. This innovation permitted the first continuous production of long pasta on a manufacturing line instead of making product in batches. DEMACO machines permitted all aspects of production in one machine, the first of its kind. It also permitted production of spaghetti without contact by human hands for a more sanitary process. Paramount Macaroni Company of Brooklyn, New York installed the first spaghetti spreader. Also in the 1940s and early 1950s, DEMACO made significant improvements to pasta dryer automation and control as well as sanitary design of equipment. In 1993, the company started a dryer manufacturing facility in Melbourne, Florida, and the remainder of the company moved there soon afterwards.

In 1983, the company received the New York Governors Award for Export Achievement.

== Products ==
The company makes the Demaco extruder and dry, fresh and frozen pasta lines. The company exports its machines worldwide.
