= Henry Low (chef) =

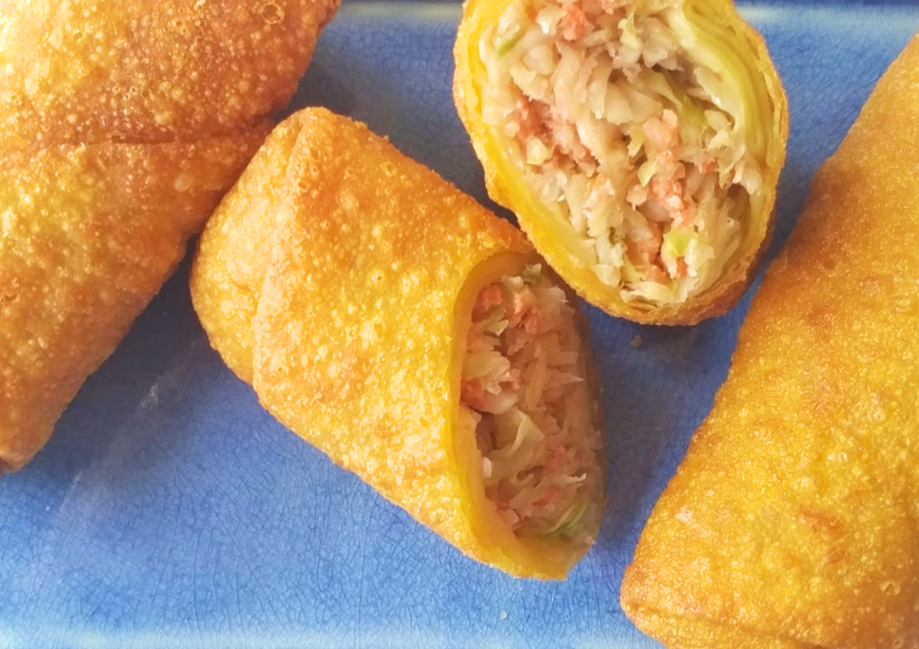
A cross-section of an egg roll.

Henry Low was a Chinese American chef at the Port Arthur Restaurant in New York City during the 1920s and 1930s, and has been credited as a possible inventor of the egg roll.

== Biography ==
Low was the head chef at Port Arthur, a popular Chinese restaurant on Mott Street in Manhattan. The restaurant primarily catered to white American patrons. He is thought to have been Cantonese because of the pronunciations used in his restaurant menus. In 1938, he published the cookbook Cook at Home in Chinese through Macmillan Publishers, which includes a recipe for egg rolls which he called "Tchun Guen". The book is credited with popularizing American Chinese recipes. He is one of two chefs in New York who may have invented the egg roll during the 1920s, the other being Lum Fong.
