= Rose Totino =

American entrepreneur (1915–1994)

- Born: Rosenella Winifred Cruciani; January 16 1915
- Died: June 21 1994 (aged 79); St. Louis Park, Minnesota, United States
- Occupations: Pizzeria entrepreneur, corporate executive
- Awards: Minnesota Inventors Hall of Fame

Rosenella Winifred Cruciani "Rose" Totino (January 16, 1915 – June 21, 1994) was an American entrepreneur and pizzeria owner whose frozen pizza business co-founded with her husband became the foundation for the Totino's brand. Rose became the first female vice president of a Fortune 500 company upon selling the Totinos brand to Pillsbury Company.

== Biography ==
Born on January 16, 1915, Rose was one of seven children to Italian immigrant parents. Her family settled in Minneapolis where she attended school until she dropped out at the age of 16 to help out with her family’s household expenses by cleaning houses. Rose would later attribute her work ethic to this work experience. In 1934, Rose met her soon to be husband, James (Jim) Totino, at a dance party. The pair married the same year and have two daughters.

Rose was a stay at home mother in the early years of her marriage. Despite having no sons, she became a den mother for a troop of boy scouts. As den mother, she became known for cooking delicious italian pies, later to be known as Pizza. After encouragement from friends, the Totinos began to consider opening a restaurant to serve Italian pies. Jim's job at a bakery was the only source of income for the Totino family, so the Totinos needed to apply for a loan. Using her bike as collateral and offering pizza slices as proof of concept to creditors, Rose and Jim secured a $1,500 loan to open a take-out pizza restaurant. In 1951, Rose and Jim used the loan to establish Totino’s Italian Kitchen in Northeast Minneapolis. The restaurant grew quickly, and was soon transitioned to a sit down restaurant. By this time, both Rose and Jim had gone full time at the restaurant, later recounting that they were so tired at the end of their days, they would go to sleep without tallying up the money that they had made. Instead, they opted to throw their earnings in a bag to count up later. After a decade of hard work at Totinos Italian Kitchen, Rose and Jim were overworked. Demand had grown enormously for their food, and the couple had no way to keep up. However, Rose recognized an opportunity to exploit this demand: frozen food. Rose and Jim bought a production facility at first specializing in frozen pasta. Despite the couple's experience in food, the production facility was plagued with issues in its first year. As costs mounted, Rose and Jim even considered filing bankruptcy. But their fortunes soon changed for the better, after the SBA approved a loan that allowed the Totinos to buy a machine capable of making pizza dough extremely quickly. Frozen pizza at the time was low quality and tasteless. The dough used by frozen pizza sellers would lose its crispness and become soggy the moment the pizza thawed. Seeing a way to outcompete their competition, Rose and Jim used their extensive skill in pizza making as well as their new machine to produce frozen pizzas. The product was an instant hit. The Totinos pizza hit shelves all over Minneapolis and slowly started to expand outwards. By the 1970s, Totino's frozen pizza was the top-selling frozen pizza in the United States.

As Totino's sales reached their peak, other companies began to take notice. In 1975, Pillsbury recognized the pizza’s popularity and offered to buy the Totino business. Pillsbury offered to buy Totino’s Pizza for $16 million, an offer which was turned down by Rose. The two companies eventually settled on a price of $22 million. After the aqcusition, Rose was appointed Pillsbury’s first female Vice President. While in this position, Rose perfected her fried freezer-to-oven crust recipe, which she patented in 1979.

With her success, Rose became a philanthropist. Rose donated millions of dollars to charities and schools across Minnesota. Due to her generosity, a high school adopted the Totino name, renaming from Grace High School to Totino-Grace High School in 1980. Rose also received notable awards regarding her innovation: she was inducted into the Minnesota Business Hall of Fame and the Frozen Food Hall of Fame, becoming the first woman to obtain such an honor. On top of this recognition, Rose was awarded the National Food Brokers Award for Outstanding Service and the Outstanding Business Leadership Award.

In 1994, at the age of 79, Rose died of cancer at Methodist Hospital in St. Louis Park, Minnesota. Rose was inducted postmortem into the Minnesota Inventors Hall of Fame in 2008, becoming the third woman to receive this honor. The Totinos had two daughters, Joanne Elwell and Bonnie Brenny, and nine grandchildren. Rose’s grandson Steve Elwell bought Totino’s Restaurant in 1987 and still owns it today.
