= Totino-Grace High School =

Private Catholic high school in Fridley, Minnesota, USA

Location
- 1350 Gardena Avenue NE; Fridley, (Anoka County), Minnesota 55432; United States; 45°4′26″N 93°14′3″W

Information
- Type: Private, coeducational
- Religious affiliation: Roman Catholic
- Established: 1966
- President: Craig Junker
- Principal: Cheri Broadhead
- Faculty: 1
- Grades: 9–12
- Gender: Co-ed
- Enrollment: 769 (2013)
- Colors: Navy blue and gold
- Athletics conference: Northwest Suburban
- Mascot: Eagle
- Team name: Eagles
- Rival: DeLaSalle Islanders
- Accreditation: North Central Association of Colleges and Schools
- Newspaper: Eagle News Network
- Yearbook: The Talon
- Website: www.totinograce.org

Totino-Grace High School is a private Catholic high school in Fridley, Minnesota. It is an archdiocesan co-educational Catholic high school in the Lasallian tradition.

== History ==
=== Founding ===
In the late 1950s, the Archdiocese of Saint Paul and Minneapolis in Minnesota sought to expand the number of Catholic high schools in the Twin Cities area. At the same time, Monsignor Joseph Lapinski, pastor of Immaculate Conception Parish in Columbia Heights, purchased some land in nearby Fridley in the hope that the archdiocese would build one of these new high schools there. Approval for a new high school in Fridley was soon given, and in 1965, the Christian Brothers accepted responsibility for administration of the school. The School Sisters of Notre Dame joined the Brothers in this task, and opened Archbishop Grace High School in September 1966, with 175 freshmen. The first graduating class was the Class of 1970.

=== Early years ===
From its very beginning, the Brothers and Sisters worked alongside laymen and laywomen as their counterparts in the school's operation. To this day, the staff have provided the tradition that is one of the school's values. The school grew throughout the late 1960s and early 1970s. In 1970, the Christian Brothers informed the Archdiocese that they could no longer be personally responsible for the financial operation of the school, and a lay Corporate Board was begun to formulate policy for the school.

The school was originally named to honor Archbishop Thomas Langdon Grace, an early Minnesota bishop who was a pioneer in education. In 1980, the name of the school was augmented to Totino-Grace to honor the generous benefaction of Jim and Rose Totino, entrepreneurs in the frozen pizza business. Today Totino-Grace is one of the largest (with a student population of approximately 800) of the thirteen Catholic high schools in the Archdiocese of St. Paul and Minneapolis.

=== 21st century ===
The school's long association with the Christian Brothers and its support of the Lasallian educational mission led Totino-Grace to declare itself to be a Lasallian School in 1997. Totino-Grace is now part of a worldwide network of Lasallian Schools with approximately 5000 Brothers and 70,000 lay colleagues teaching nearly one million students in eighty-two countries.

== Staff controversies ==
On July 2, 2013, the school president, Dr. William Hudson, resigned and disclosed that he had been in an 18-year-long same-sex relationship. The school hired Craig Junker as his replacement.

Totino-Grace also terminated the employment of English and religion teacher Kristen Ostendorf in August 2013 two days after her coming-out as a lesbian. Ostendorf taught at Totino-Grace High School without issue for 18 years but was summarily dismissed when she refused to resign willingly from her position. When asked why she came out as a lesbian despite the obvious threat to her job, Ostendorf stated that she found herself unwilling to remain "part of a community where I was required to hide and compromise and deny who I am".

== Athletics ==
Totino-Grace offers 18 different sport activities, including baseball, basketball, bowling, cheerleading, cross country, dance, football, golf, ice hockey, lacrosse, soccer, softball, swimming, tennis, track and field, volleyball, weight lifting and wrestling. There are also a number of extracurricular organizations.

=== Bowling ===
In recent years, bowling has become the most popular athletic activity at Totino-Grace. A varsity team and 6 JV teams compete in the Minnesota High School Bowling Metro Central Conference. In 2015, the varsity team made their first state tournament appearance and finished 2nd overall, losing in the championship match.

=== Football ===
The football team was Minnesota State Champions in 1977, 1978, 2003, 2004, 2006, 2007, 2009, and 2010 in the Class AAAA division. In 1977, 1978, 2006 2009 and 2012, the Eagles had perfect records. The team also had a second-place finish in 1989, along with 24 total state tournament appearances. In 2011, the team moved up to Class AAAAA, and in 2012, the team won the Class AAAAA state championship. In 2013, the team moved up to Class AAAAAA. In 2016, the team won their first Class AAAAAA championship, defeating Eden Prairie, 28–20, in the Prep Bowl.

=== Hockey ===
The men's hockey team won the Class A state tournament in 2002 vs Red Wing 3-2 and finished the season 27–2–1. The men's team also finished 2nd in the state during the 1995 and 2005 seasons. In the 1995 Championship game, International Falls scored with only 17.3 seconds left in the game, to beat Grace, 3–2. In 2005, Totino-Grace fell to Warroad in the second overtime, 4–3.

=== Basketball ===
Girls' basketball won the state tournament in 2008 and 2022.

Boys' basketball won the Minnesota Class 3A state championship in 2022, 2023, 2024, and 2026.

=== Baseball ===
Totino-Grace Baseball won their first Class AAA state championship in 2024, beating Mahtomedi 2–1.

=== Soccer ===
Girls' soccer won the state tournament in 2001, 2002 and 2007. Boys' soccer won the state tournament in 2002, 2004. and 2017.

In 2009, Paul Yonga was named Class A Mr. Soccer. Yonga owns the career scoring record at T-G, the single season and career assists record, and was named the best player in the North Suburban Conference as both a junior and a senior. He was First-Team All-State three consecutive seasons, and was chosen as the Minnesota High School Gatorade Boys Soccer Player of the Year as a junior.

=== Dance team ===
The E'gals Dance Team has won many state championships and has placed in at least the top 4 every year.

=== Track and field ===
Track and field has had many true team state appearances, including a boys' first-place finish in 2006 and girls in 2008. The track and field team won the True Team State Championship in both the boys and girls division in 2009. This is the first time in school history that both boys and girls have won in the same season.

=== Cross country ===
The boys' cross country team had their first state appearance in 2009 and back-to-back appearances in 2022 and 2023. The girls' cross country team won the MN State Championship in their first appearance in 1970. This was the first state championship for the then-recently established T.L. Grace High School, now Totino Grace. Four members of the team competed in 1970 Nationals in St. Louis.

=== Lacrosse ===
In addition to many conference and state championships by numerous teams, the 2010 Totino-Grace Boys Varsity Lacrosse team won its first section 4 title.

=== Girls' tennis ===
Totino-Grace High School's girls' tennis is a fall season sport as well as a no-cut program, allowing players of any ability level (beginner or experienced) to join. This sport is split into a team of eleven to twelve varsity players with the remaining joining junior varsity.

== Performing arts ==
Totino-Grace is widely known throughout the country for the choir and band programs. Under the direction of Terrence Voss (choir) and Tim Hoffman (band), the performing arts at Totino-Grace have grown immensely in popularity and esteem or the past few years. They have performed in many ceremonies, such as their performances with the Minnesota National Guard Band in 2012 or most recently at The 50th Anniversary of the Assassination of John F. Kennedy Ceremony in Washington D.C. in January 2013.

=== Show choir ===
Much like the Totino-Grace academic choir, the school's varsity show choir, Company of Singers, has had great success since its beginning. Under the direction of Terry Voss and Tim Hoffman, along with assistant directors Heather Douglas and Bryce Mahlstedt, the group is an all student ensemble, with accompanying crew and band. Over the past decade they have grown into one of the most recognizable show choirs in the country. After their perfect season in 2010 where the group swept at all of their competitions, the groups has gone on to compete both the FAME Nationals and the National Competition in Nashville, Tennessee.

== Notable alumni ==
- Joe Alt, NFL offensive lineman for the Los Angeles Chargers
- John Crockett, NFL running back
- Herbert Endeley, MLS soccer player
- Ben Meyer, MLB pitcher for the Miami Marlins
- Oliver Moore, 19th overall pick by Chicago Blackhawks in the 2023 NHL entry draft
- Kimberly Potter, police officer
- Sam Hentges, Hockey Player
