= Bellisio Foods =

American frozen food manufacturer

Bellisio Foods Incorporated
- Formerly: Michelina's
- Type: Private
- Industry: Frozen food
- Founded: July 7, 1918; 108 years ago 1990 (as Bellisio Foods); Duluth, Minnesota, U.S.
- Founder: Jeno Paulucci
- Headquarters: Minneapolis, Minnesota, U.S.
- Parent: Charoen Pokphand Foods
- Website: bellisiofoods.com

Bellisio Foods Incorporated (formerly Michelina's) is an American frozen food manufacturer based in Minneapolis, Minnesota. The company was founded by Jeno Paulucci in Duluth, Minnesota, and is now owned by Charoen Pokphand Foods Public Company Limited of Thailand. Its products are primarily sold in the United States and are also distributed in more than 12 countries, including Canada, Australia, Russia and China. As the third-largest producer of frozen entrees in the United States the company has a daily production capacity of over two million meals.

The company produces over 400 products in multiple categories, including single-serve and multi-serve entrees, snacks, side dishes and specialty sauces. Bellisio brands include Michelina's, Michelina's Lean Gourmet, Michelina's Budget Gourmet, Fusion Culinary, Arden Kitchens, Chariton and Howlin' Coyote.

The company also offers contract manufacturing via private label and co-pack partnerships for retail products. Co-pack brands include Chili's, Boston Market and Zatarain's.

Bellisio operates Fusion Culinary Center, a wholly owned subsidiary based in Lakeville, Minnesota. Fusion conducts research and development for many national restaurant chains. Originally produced in Duluth, Bellisio's products now ship from its facility in Jackson, Ohio. Duluth still handles portions of the packaging and financial departments. The executive offices of Bellisio are in Minneapolis.

== Acquisitions ==
On June 16, 2013, Bellisio purchased APC Foods, located in Austin, Minnesota, for $6.1 million. APC was for sale after its owners filed for receivership to avoid bankruptcy.

Also in 2013, Overhill Farms Inc., a frozen foods manufacturer based in Vernon, California, was acquired by the company for approximately $80 million.

Bellisio was purchased by Thai food conglomerate Charoen Pokphand Foods in 2016 for $1.08 billion.
