= Chun King =

U.S. marketed Chinese food products

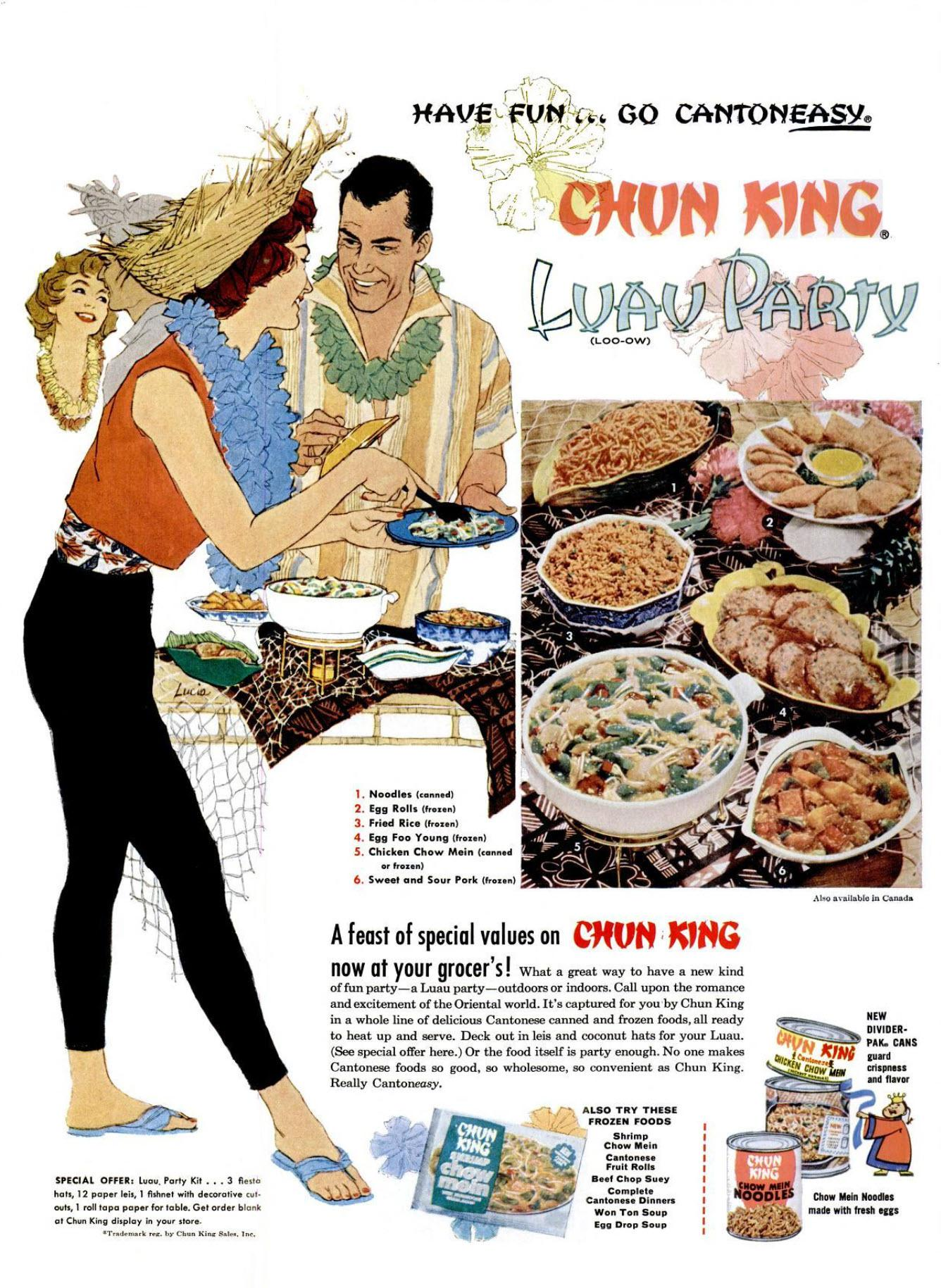
- 1959 magazine ad for the product.
- Trade name: Chun King

Chun King was an American brand of canned Chinese food products founded in the 1940s by Jeno Paulucci, whose company also developed Jeno's Pizza Rolls and frozen pizza, and the Michelina's brand of frozen food products, among many others. By 1962, Chun King was bringing in $30 million in annual revenue and accounted for half of all U.S. sales of prepared Chinese food. In 1966, it was sold to the R. J. Reynolds Tobacco Company for $63 million.

R. J. Reynolds merged with Nabisco Brands in 1985 and the new company changed its name to RJR Nabisco the following year. In 1989, Chun King was sold to Yeo Hiap Seng of Singapore to help pay for Kohlberg Kravis Roberts' leveraged buyout of RJR Nabisco. RJR Nabisco had previously sold the Chun King line of frozen foods to ConAgra Foods in 1986. After losing market share, Yeo Hiap Seng sold Chun King in 1995 to Hunt-Wesson, owner of rival La Choy. Hunt-Wesson's parent, ConAgra, eventually closed Chun King's manufacturing facilities in 1995 and discontinued the brand.

== See also ==
- Chongqing
- La Choy
- American Chinese cuisine
