= Frozen pizza =

Pizza stored at a low temperature

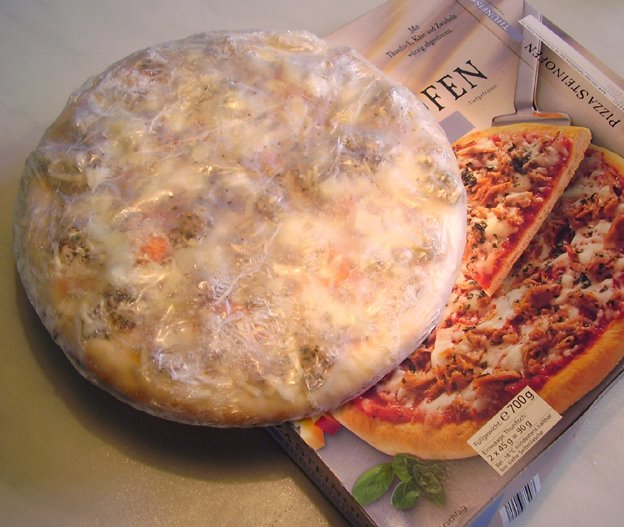
A wrapped frozen pizza

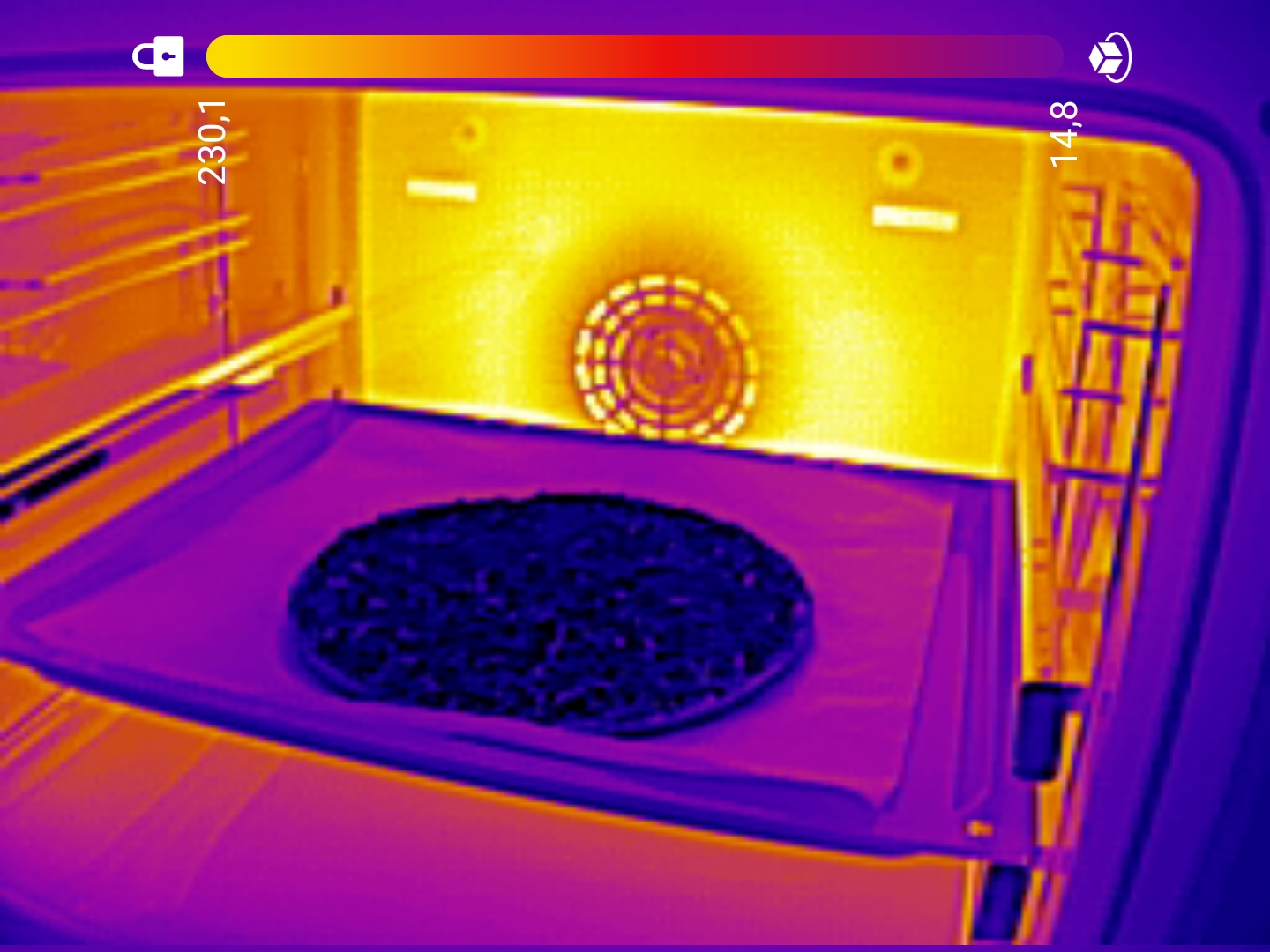
Thermal camera image of a frozen pizza in an oven

A frozen pizza is a mass-manufactured pizza which is frozen before distribution to consumers, with the intention of being cooked in an oven before consumption.

== Ingredients and toppings ==
=== Crust ===
Frozen pizza crusts may be thick or thin; popular sub-variations of the thick-crust frozen pizza concept include hand-tossed crusts and self-rising crusts. In particular, self-rising frozen pizza crusts are designed to provide a similar experience to that of a pizzeria; these crusts contain leavening agents to allow them to rise as they bake, and were initially introduced to the public by the DiGiorno brand of frozen pizza.

Another important consideration relating to frozen pizza crusts is the prevention of excess moisture during the oven-baking process caused by the pizza sauce leaking into the crust during baking; an "edible sealing agent" is required to ensure that the crust remains the proper texture. Vacuum sealing is also used to prevent excess moisture from the air getting into the crust, and additives such as oils, yeast, and baking soda are used to help leaven and strengthen the dough.

=== Cheese and cheese analogues ===
"Cheese analogues" (as they are known in the United Kingdom) are cheese-like products for pizza which are both quicker and cheaper to produce than real cheese. They are designed to melt well and remain chewy. These are a fairly common frozen pizza topping in North America and the United Kingdom.

=== Other toppings ===
The most popular varieties of frozen pizza typically have both meat and vegetable toppings. Popular meat toppings may include pepperoni, sausage, ground beef, and back bacon. Specialty toppings incorporating foods from other cuisines, such as Mexican or East Asian cuisines, are also widely available.

== History ==
The development of frozen pizza stemmed from two simultaneous processes: the popularisation of pizza in the United States following World War II, and the widespread adoption of home freezers in American homes around the same time. Take and bake pizza parlors, where refrigerated pizzas were available for consumption at home, were developed by 1950. That same year, Joseph Bucci filed U.S. patent US2668117A, "Method for Making Frozen Pizza": the first recorded patent for frozen pizza. By the time of the granting of the patent in 1954, frozen pizzas were already being sold in grocery stores under various brand names. Through the 1950s, pizza was largely considered a snack food rather than a full meal; however, with the rise in avaiability of frozen pizzas, it began to be seen as a meal unto itself over the course of the following decade.

The first national-scale frozen pizza business in the United States was Totino's, which began mass-manufacturing frozen pizzas beginning in 1962. It was initially unsuccessful, but achieved more success in 1963 following a decision to purchase frozen pizza crusts and focus instead on sauces and toppings. The business became the market leader over the next decade, and was purchased by Pillsbury in 1975 for US$22,000,000 (equivalent to US$131,632,653 in 2025). Over this same period, other major frozen pizza brands proliferated; these included Mama Celeste (founded in the early 1960s, sold to Quaker Oats Company in 1969), Tombstone Pizza (founded in 1966, sold to Kraft Foods in 1984), and Red Baron (founded in 1976 as an imprint of Schwan's Company).

Through the 1970s, high competition between manufacturers of frozen pizza brands resulted in significant cost-cutting measures; for instance, the use of cheese analogues instead of real cheese and extended tomato sauce instead of pure tomato sauce. Some consumers reacted to this decline in quality by purchasing cheap frozen pizzas and then adding their own toppings. The frozen pizza industry also struggled due to this quality decline and competition with pizzerias specializing in high-quality ingredients. Some companies in the frozen pizza industry responded to this new competition by introducing product lines with higher-quality ingredients at different price points.

Growth in the frozen pizza industry was fairly steady from the late 1970s to the mid-1990s. In 1996, Kraft introduced the DiGiorno line of frozen pizzas, which were the first brand to feature a self-rising crust. This was followed by Schwan's introducing the Freschetta brand with similar technology. Self-rising crusts helped frozen pizzas seem more like pizzas from a pizzeria, making them popular with consumers. For this reason, these product lines were highly successful, and DiGiorno became the top-selling brand of frozen pizzas by 1997.

Frozen pizza was a US$1 billion dollar industry by 1980, and it had risen to be worth over US$10 billion worldwide by 2020. In 2010, Kraft Foods sold its frozen pizza businesses to Nestlé for US$3.7 billion.

== See also ==
- Pizza rolls
