= Pizza rolls =

Frozen pizza snack

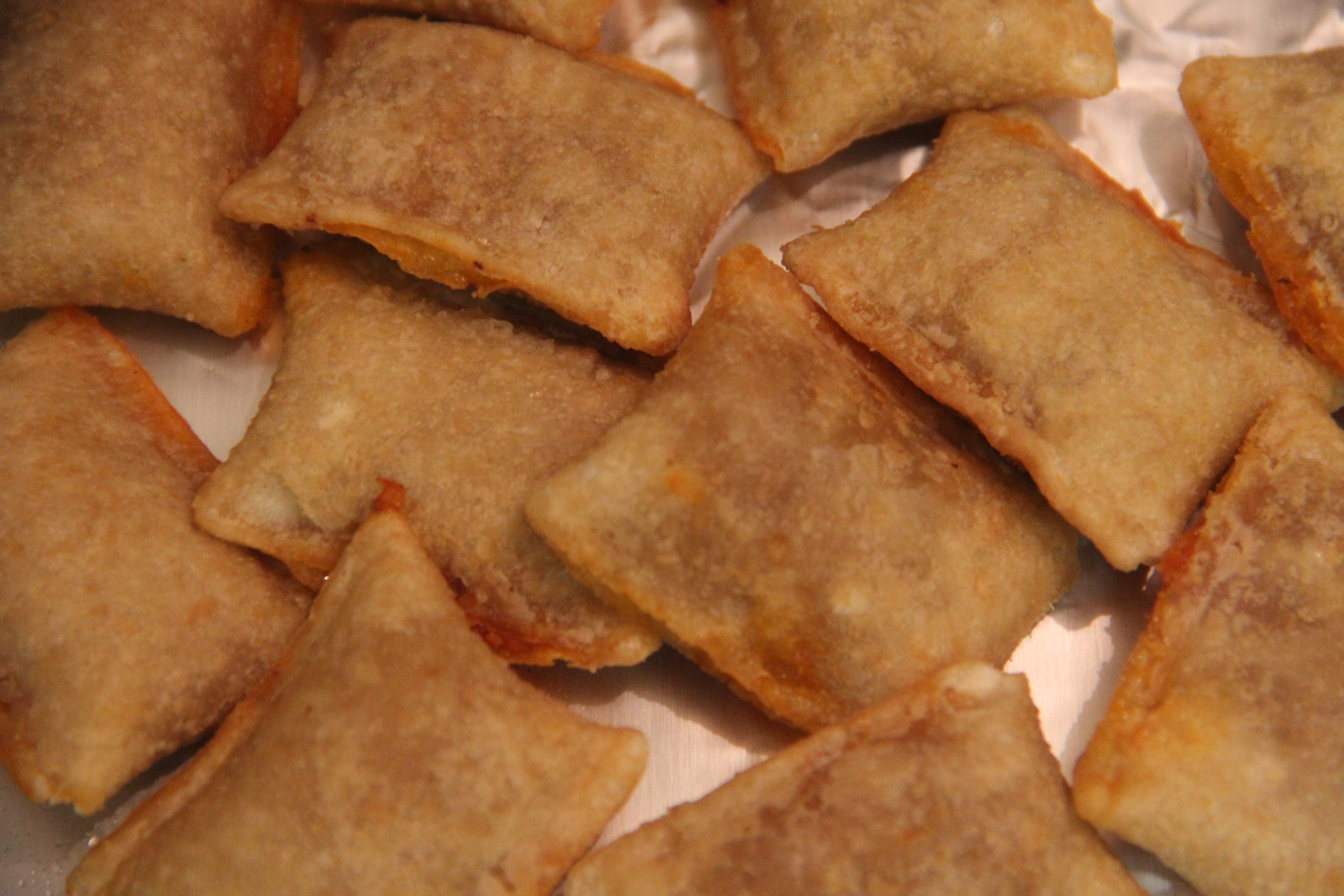
Cooked Totino's Pizza Rolls

Pizza rolls are a frozen food product consisting of bite-sized breaded pizza pockets with an interior of tomato sauce, cheese or cheese analogue, and various pizza toppings. They are sold in a variety of flavors including cheese, pepperoni, sausage, supreme, multiple imitation cheeses, and mixed meats. Other flavors include hamburger, cheeseburger, ham and cheese, and combination (pepperoni and sausage). Pizza snack rolls are designed to be quickly cooked in the oven or microwave. The name "pizza rolls" is a trademark of General Mills, current owner of the original product, currently sold under the Totino's brand.

Similar products are made by other brands and private labels. Since the original name is trademark protected, different names are used such as pizza bites, pizza snacks, or pizza poppers.

== History ==
Pizza rolls were created in the mid-1960s in Duluth, Minnesota, United States, by product developer and cook Beatrice Ojakangas. She worked for food industry entrepreneur Jeno Paulucci, who specialized in canned and frozen Chinese food under the Chun King brand and was looking for new uses for his egg roll wrapping machine. According to Ojakangas, she started with over 50 filling ideas, including a number of sandwich flavors such as peanut butter and jelly. Several of her pizza-flavored concepts performed well on taste tests. Paulucci stated, "pizza rolls are nothing but egg rolls with pizza crust and filling." For the commercial production, Paulucci adopted a co-extrusion process using a Demaco extruder. Jeno's, Paulucci's frozen pizza brand, began using the Pizza Rolls trademark in 1967.

In 1985, Paulucci sold Jeno's to Pillsbury, which owned Totino's pizza. Jeno's Pizza Rolls were rebranded as Totino's Pizza Rolls in 1993. Pillsbury was sold to General Mills in 2001. After a series of commercial spoofs on Saturday Night Live, Totino's pizza rolls saw a boost in popularity and sales in 2016.

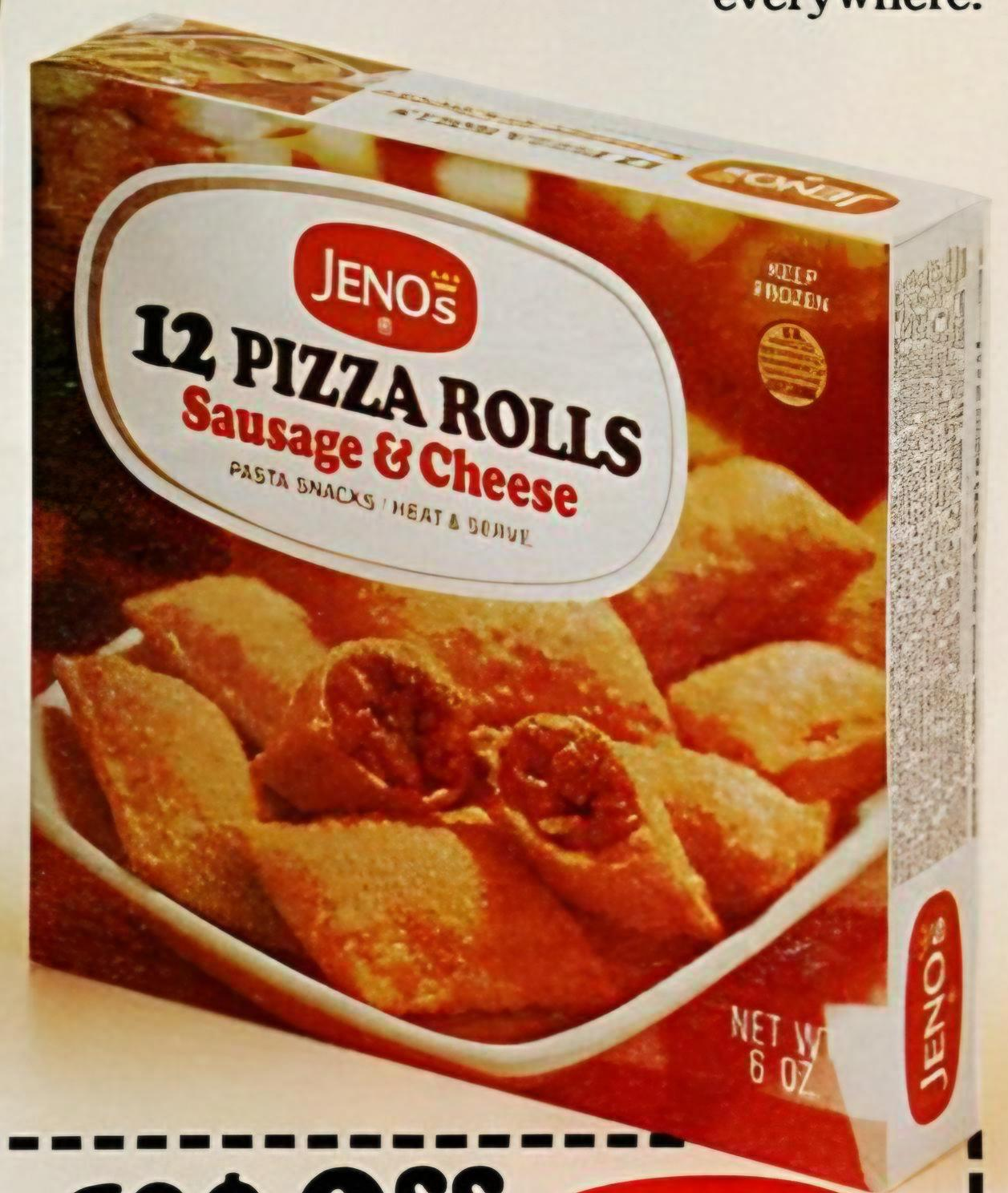
Jeno's Pizza Rolls (1977)

Pepperoni Pizza Rolls packaging

== See also ==
- Calzone
- List of stuffed dishes
- Pizza bagel
- Pocket sandwich
- Samosa
- Stromboli
