= Egg roll =

American Chinese appetizer

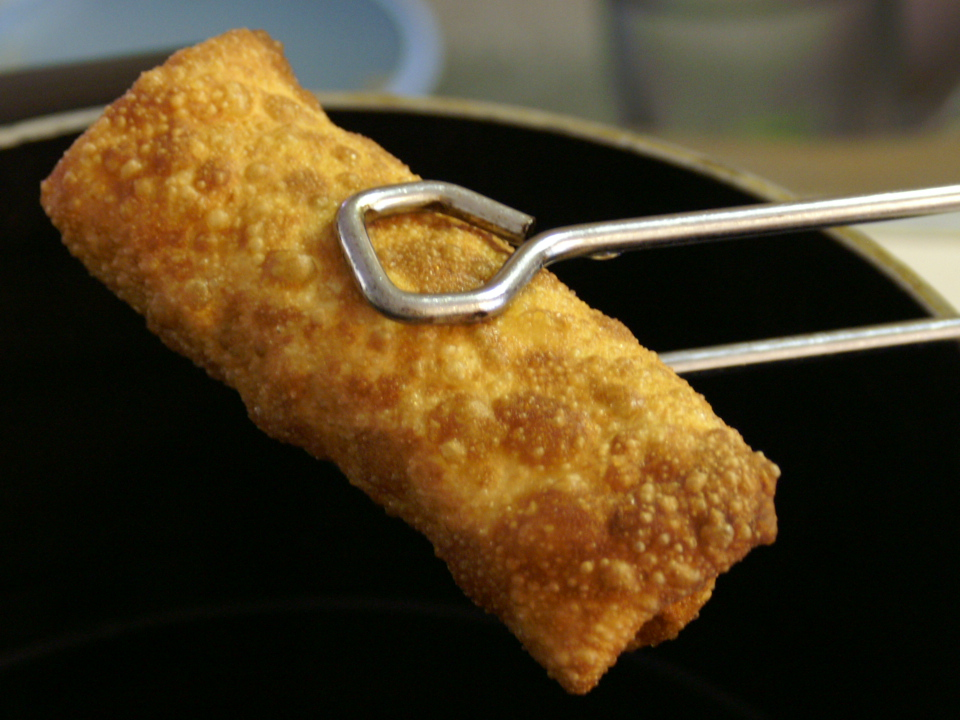
- Fried egg roll with rough, bubbly outer skin
- Type: American Chinese cuisine
- Course: Hors d'oeuvre or side dish
- Place of origin: United States
- Region or state: New York City
- Created by: Undetermined. Generally attributed to Henry Low in New York City in the 1930s
- Main ingredients: Wheat pastry skin, cabbage, pork (or other meat)

Egg roll
- Chinese: 蛋卷
- Literal meaning: "egg roll"
Transcriptions
Standard Mandarin
- Hanyu Pinyin: dàn juǎn
- IPA: [tân.tɕɥɛ̀n]
Yue: Cantonese
- Jyutping: daan6-gyun2
Southern Min
- Hokkien POJ: tàn-kòan

The egg roll is a variety of a deep-fried appetizer served in American Chinese restaurants. It is a cylindrical, savory roll with shredded cabbage, chopped meat, or other fillings inside a thickly wrapped wheat flour skin, which is fried in hot oil. Despite its name, egg rolls generally do not contain egg. However, it is sometimes brushed with egg white to seal the edges.

The dish is served warm, and is usually eaten with the fingers, dipped in duck sauce, soy sauce, plum sauce, or hot mustard, often from a cellophane packet. Egg rolls are a ubiquitous feature of American Chinese cuisine.

== Origins ==
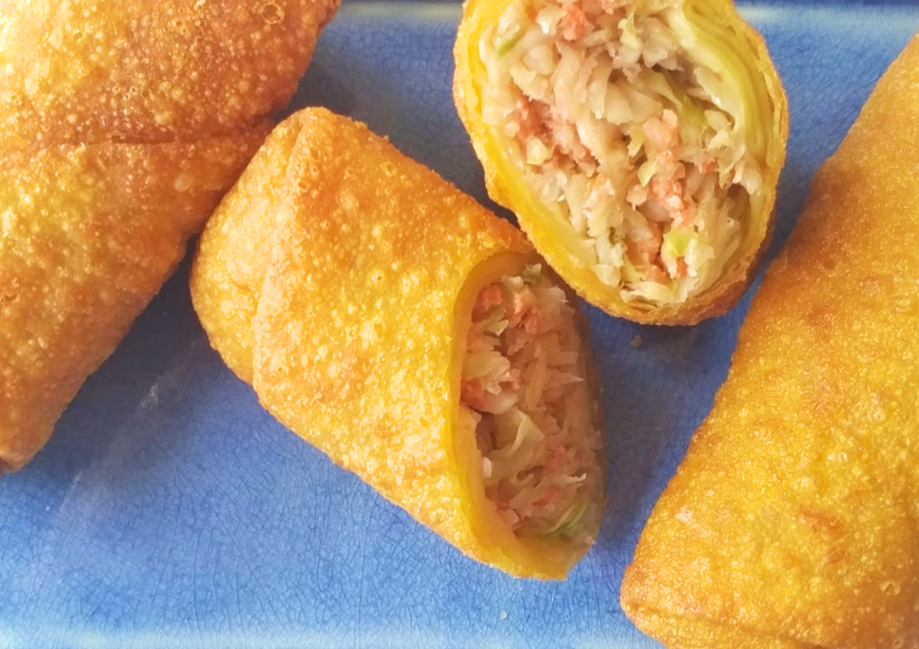
Egg roll filling is mostly cabbage with a small amount of chopped meat and other ingredients

The origins of the egg roll are unclear and remain disputed. Egg rolls are very similar to, but distinct from, the spring rolls served in mainland China; they were first seen in the early 20th century in the United States.

Andrew Coe, author of Chop Suey: A Cultural History of Chinese Food in the United States, has stated that the modern American egg roll was probably invented at a Chinese restaurant in New York City in the early 1930s, by one of two chefs who both later claimed credit for the creation: Lung Fong of Lung Fong's, or Henry Low of Port Arthur. According to Coe, Low's recipe, printed in a 1938 cookbook, Cook at Home in Chinese, included "bamboo shoots, roast pork, shrimp, scallions, water chestnuts, salt, MSG, sugar, palm oil, and pepper"; they did not include cabbage, which is the main filling ingredient in modern egg rolls.

== Ingredients ==
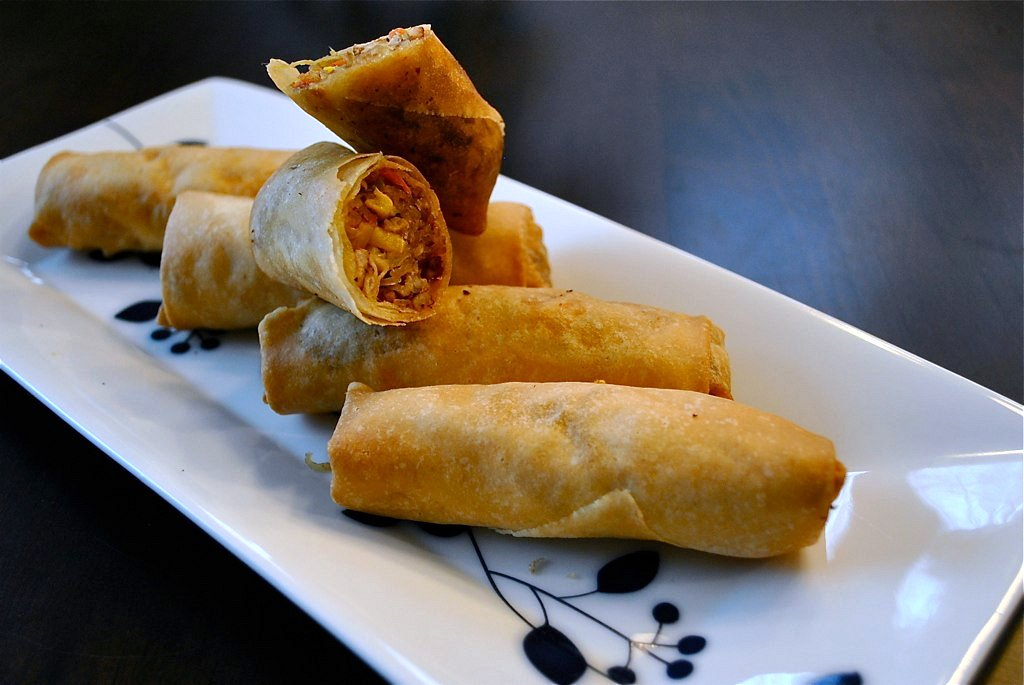
Egg rolls cut open

It is unclear how the word "egg" appeared in the name, since the predominant flavor in American egg rolls is cabbage, not eggs. A 1979 article in The Washington Post offered two theories: 1) that the word for "egg" in Chinese, (蛋, Mandarin:dàn, Cantonese:daan6), sounded similar to the word for "spring", (春, Mandarin:chūn, Cantonese:ceon1), and 2) that southern Chinese chefs used eggs in the thin wrapper skin. Another possible origin of the name is from a recipe for "egg roll" (also labeled as "dan gun") in the 1917 cookbook The Chinese Cook Book by Shiu Wong Chan. This recipe called for meat and vegetables rolled inside a layer of fried egg rather than a flour-based wrapper.

Nom Wah Tea Parlor in New York City claims the oldest or original egg roll. The restaurant has been in operation since 1920 and states they have been making their very large egg rolls using a thin omelette or 'egg crêpe' wrapper since 1929 (unlike modern variations which use a wheat dough wrapper).

== Other varieties ==
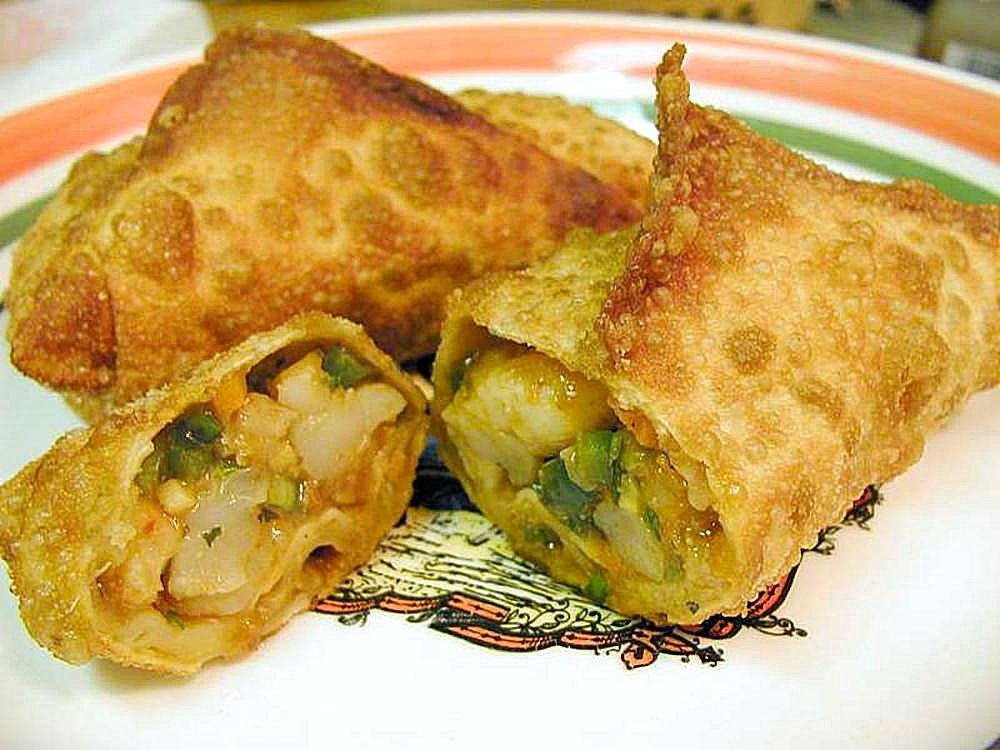
Egg rolls with shrimp filling

While there are many types of spring rolls native to East Asia and available in authentic Chinese, Thai, and Vietnamese restaurants in the United States, American egg rolls are distinctive. A typical "New York–style" egg roll measures two inches in diameter by six inches in length, with a thick, chewy, crispy, bumpy exterior skin. Egg rolls, like other Americanized Chinese food specialties, may contain ingredients and flavors that are not common in China, including broccoli. A particularly American variety of egg roll is the pizza log, also known as a pizza roll, which is not associated with American Chinese cuisine, instead being filled with pepperoni pizza ingredients and served as a deep-fried tavern appetizer.

Restaurants that serve egg rolls occasionally also offer spring rolls as a separate menu option, and these spring rolls may be served with a cold filling wrapped in banh trang rice paper wrappers (particularly at Vietnamese restaurants that serve both egg rolls and spring rolls as appetizers), or fried, as seen in some Thai and Chinese restaurants. When fried, spring rolls served in Asian restaurants in the United States usually have a smaller diameter and a lighter, crispier skin made out of thinner sheets of wheat or rice dough.

== Gallery ==
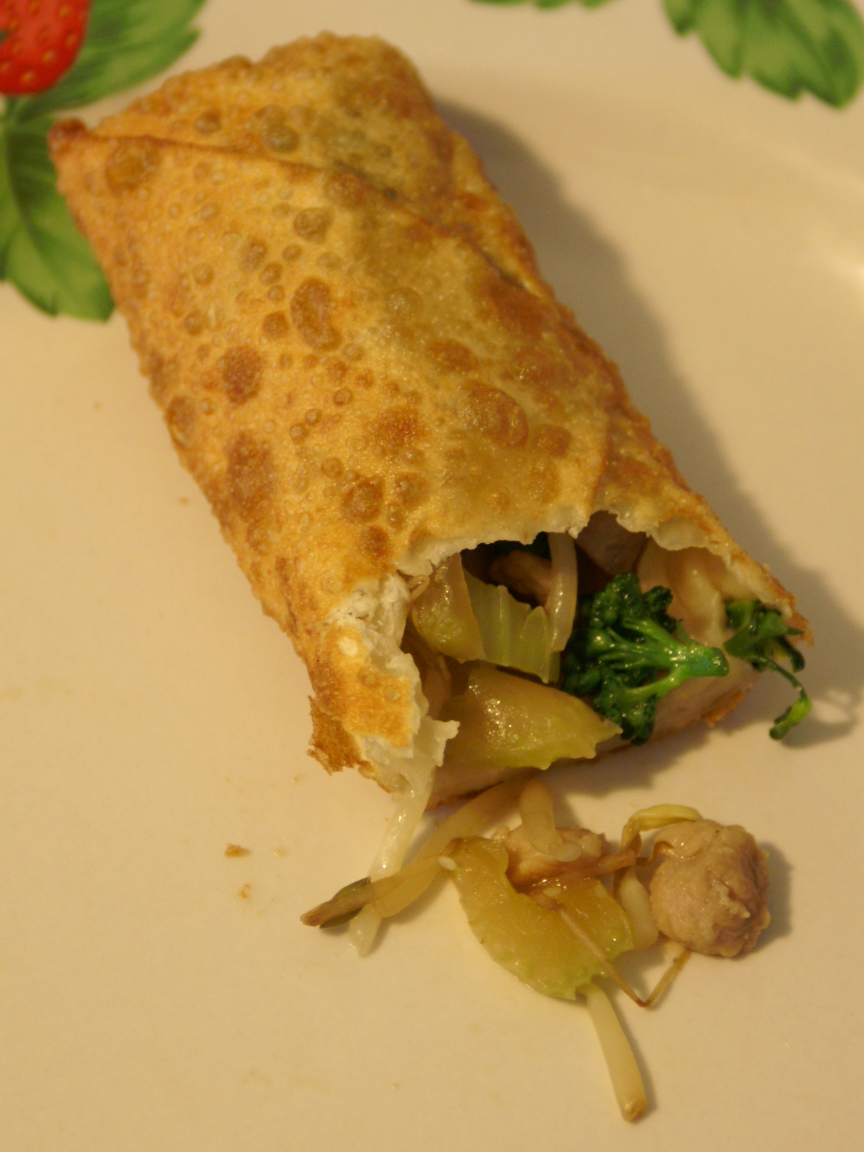

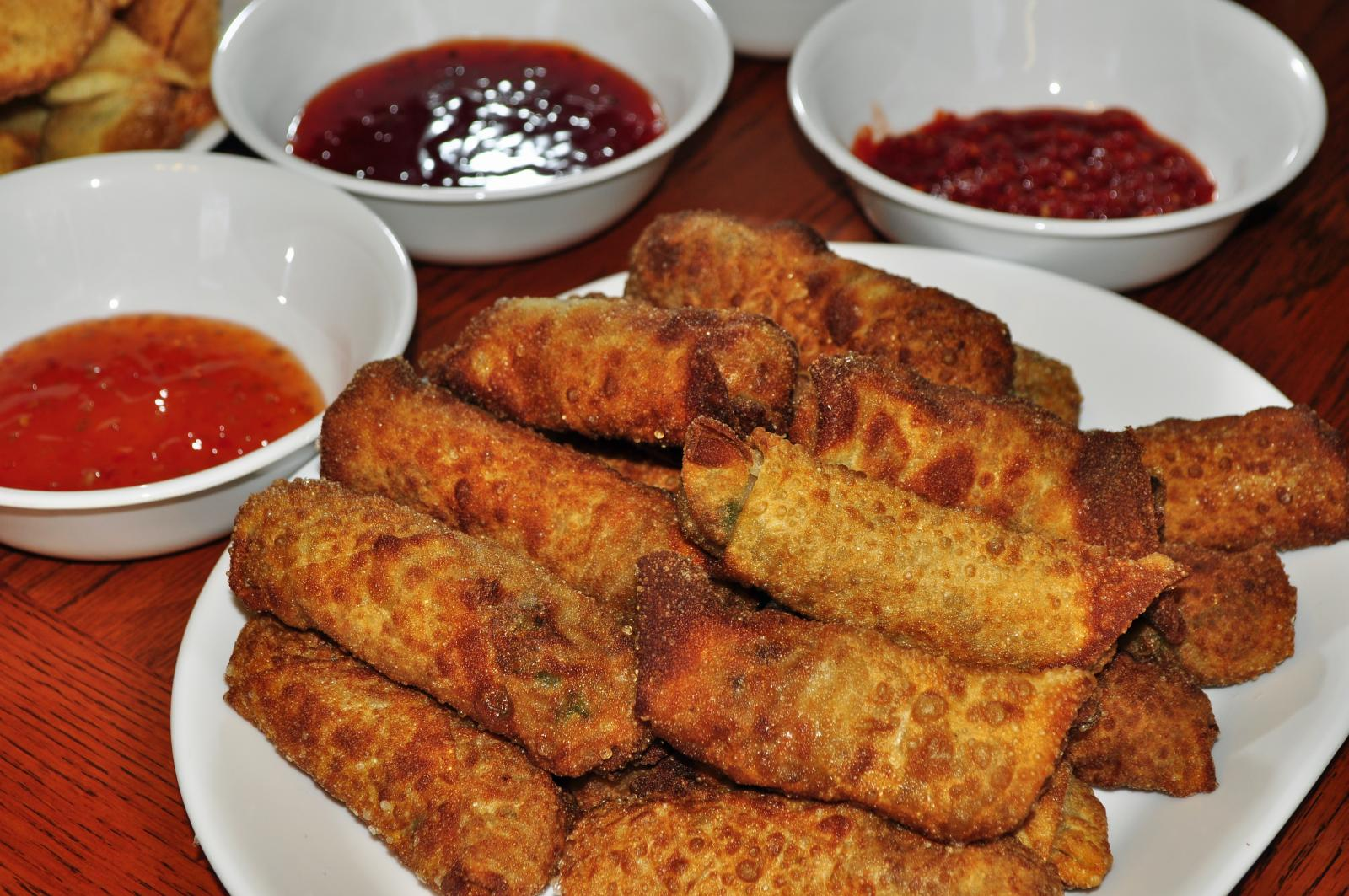

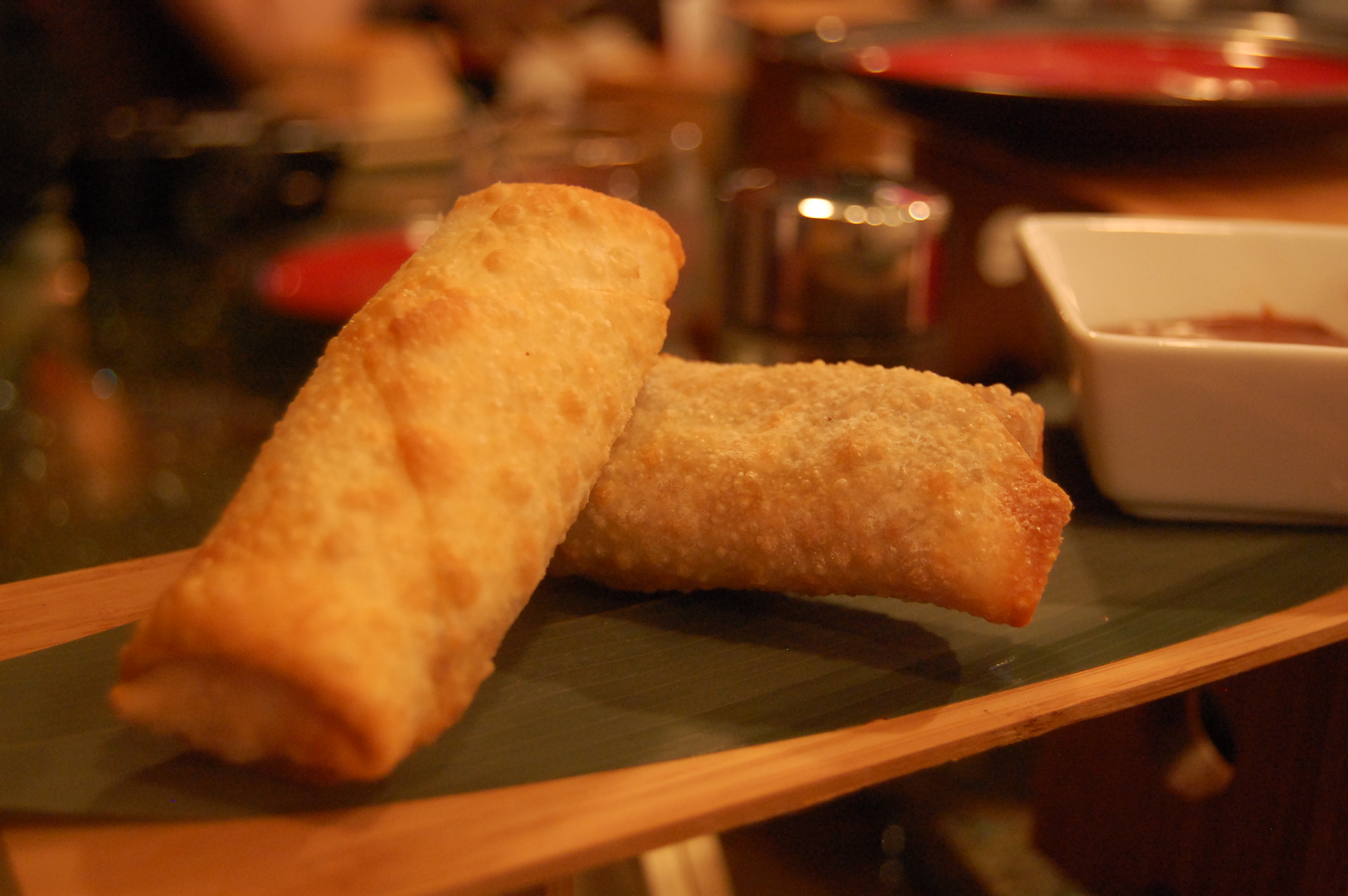

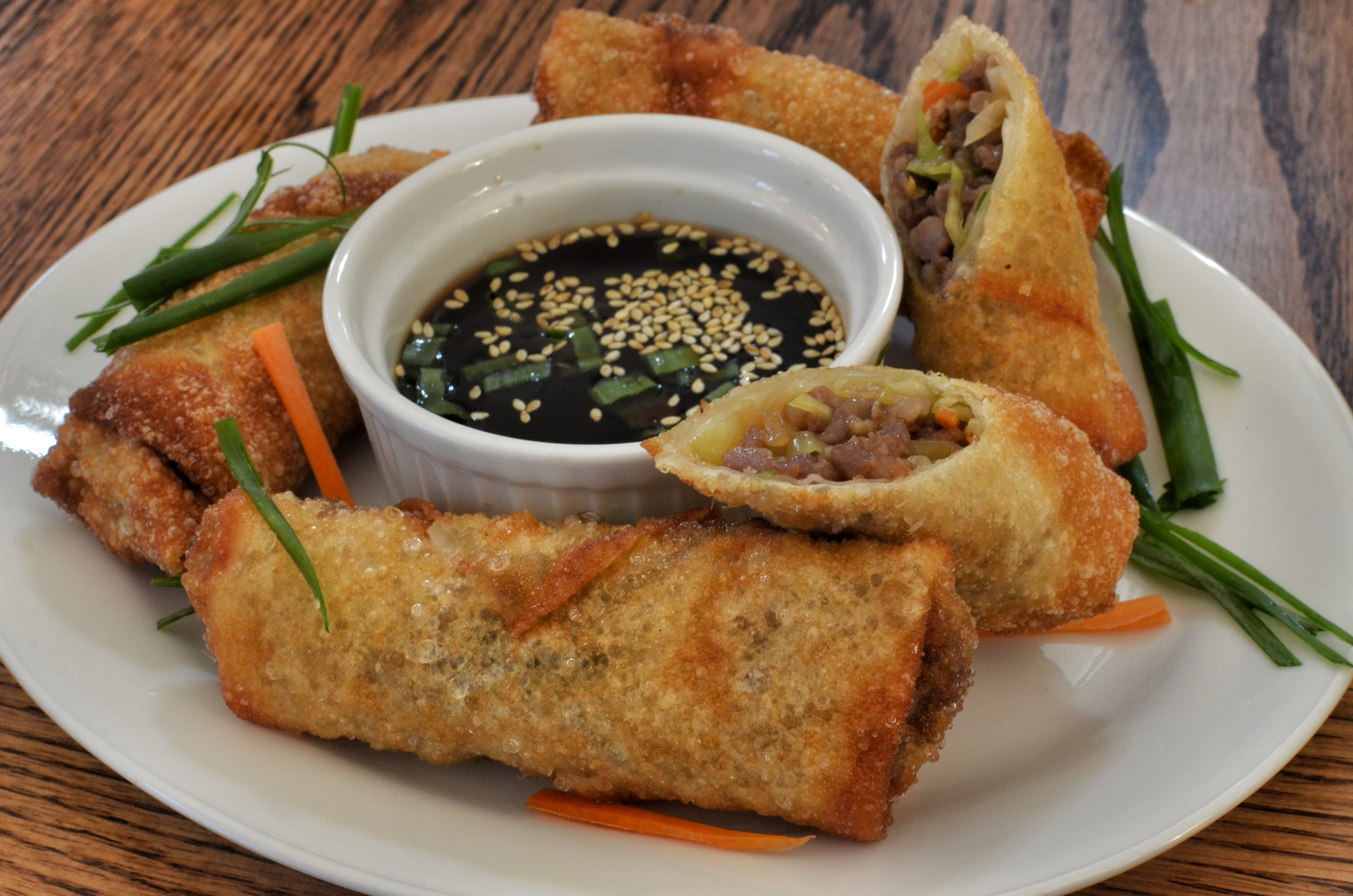

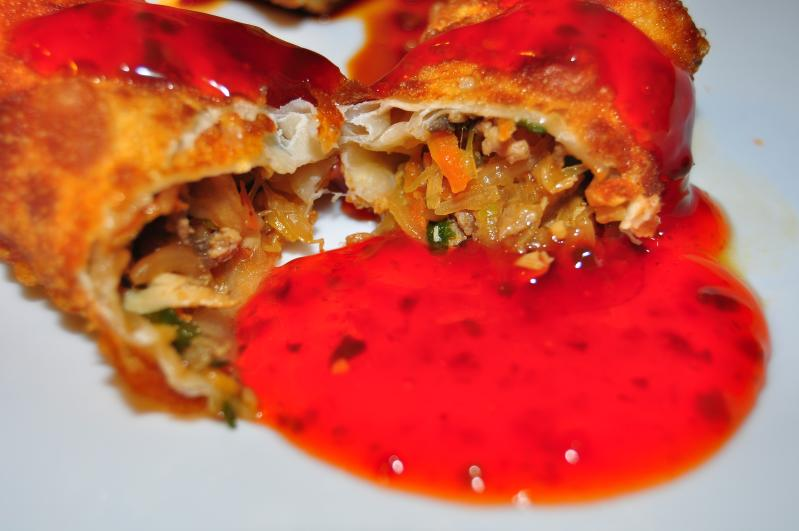
With sweet sauce

== See also ==
- Brik
- Chả giò
- Chiko Roll
- Crab Rangoon
- Gyeran-mari
- Kati roll
- List of deep fried foods
- List of stuffed dishes
- Lumpia
- Pastel
- Popiah
- Sambousa
- Spring roll
- Summer roll
- Yaka mein
