= Kent (surname) =

Kent is a surname. Notable people with the name include:

== A–D ==
- A. Atwater Kent (1873–1949), American engineer and inventor
- St. Æthelberht of Kent (560–616), King of Kent
- Æthelbert II of Kent (died 762), King of Kent
- St. Æthelburh of Kent (died c. 647), Queen of Northumbria
- St. Æthelred of Kent (died c. 699), Kentish prince and martyr
- Adaline Kent (1900–1957), American sculptor
- Alan M. Kent (1967–2022) Cornish poet
- Alexander Kent (disambiguation)
- Princess Alexandra of Kent (born 1936), British princess
- Allegra Kent (born 1937), American ballet dancer
- Alric of Kent, King of Kent
- Andy Kent (born 1969), Australian musician
- Arthur Kent (born 1953), Canadian television journalist
- St Augustine of Kent (died 604), 1st Archbishop of Canterbury
- Baldred of Kent, King of Kent
- Barbara Kent (1907–2011), Canadian actress
- Barrett Kent (born 2004), American baseball player
- Becky Kent, Canadian politician
- Beorhtnoð æthling of Kent, English ruler
- Beorhtweald Ealdorman of Kent, English ruler
- St Bertha of Kent (539 – c. 612), Queen of Kent
- Bob Kent, American football coach
- Bobby Kent (1973–1993), American murder victim
- Brian Kent, American musical artist
- Bruce Kent (1929–2022), British activist
- Carlton W. Kent (born 1957), 16th Sergeant Major of the United States Marine Corps
- Carol Kent (born 1953), American politician
- Carolyn Kent (1935–2009), American activist
- Charles Kent (actor) (1852–1923), British-American actor
- Charles Kent (English writer) (1823–1902), British author
- Charles Kent (Norwegian writer) (1880–1938), Norwegian writer
- Charles Kent (rugby union) (1953–2005), English rugby union player
- Charles Foster Kent (1867–1925), American historian
- Charles W. Kent (1860–1917), scholar of English literature
- Christopher Kent (born 1991), Papua New Guinean cricketer
- Clark Kent (producer) (born c. 1966), Panamanian record producer
- Clint Kent (born 1983), American football player
- Constance Kent (1844–1944), British murderer
- Copper Kent (1891 – c. 1966), Australian rugby player
- Corita Kent (1918–1986), American artist and nun
- Crauford Kent (1881–1953), Anglo-American actor
- Cuthred of Kent (died 807), King of Kent
- Danny Kent (born 1993), English motorcycle racer
- David Kent (historian), Australian historian
- David Kent (politician) (died 1930), Irish politician
- Dean Kent (footballer) (born 1994), Australian footballer
- Dean Kent (swimmer) (born 1978), New Zealand swimmer
- Don Kent (music historian), American music producer
- Don Kent (meteorologist) (1917–2010), American meteorologist
- Don Kent (wrestler) (1933–1993), American wrestler
- Donte Kent (born 2001), American football player
- Dora Kent (c. 1904–1987), American cryonics patient
- Dorothea Kent (1916–1990), American actress
- Doug Kent (born 1967), American bowler

== E–H ==
- Eadbald of Kent (died 640), King of Kent
- Eadbert I of Kent (died 748), King of Kent
- Eadbert II of Kent, King of Kent
- Eadbert Praen of Kent, King of Kent
- Eadgifu of Kent (died 968), Queen of England
- Eadric of Kent (died c. 687), King of Kent
- Ealhmund of Kent (745–827), King of Kent
- Edward Thomas Kent, changed his name to Éamonn Ceannt (1881–1916), Irish revolutionary
- Eanmund of Kent, King of Kent
- Eardwulf of Kent, King of Kent
- Ecgberht of Kent (died 673), King of Kent
- Ed Kent (1859–1943), American baseball player
- Edith Kent (1908–2012), English welder
- Edward Kent (1802–1877), governor of Maine
- Edward Kent, Jr. (1862–1916), Chief Justice of the Arizona Territorial Supreme Court (1902–12)
- Edward Austin Kent (1854–1912), American architect
- Egbert II of Kent, King of Kent
- Ellen Kent (born 1949 or 1950), British theatre director
- Enid Kent (born 1945), American actress
- Eorcenberht of Kent (died 664), King of Kent
- Eormenred of Kent (6??-6??), King of Kent
- Eormenric of Kent, King of Kent
- Eric Kent (1919–2019), Australian politician
- Ernie Kent (born 1955), American basketball coach
- Everett Kent (1888–1963), US congressman from Pennsylvania
- Frank Kent (1877–1958), American journalist
- Fred Kent, American urban planner
- Gary Kent (1933–2023), American film director, actor, and stuntman
- George E. Kent (1920–1982), American academic
- Gerald Kent (1904–1944), Canadian actor and soldier
- Grace Helen Kent (1875–1973), American clinical psychologist
- Greg Kent (born 1943), American football player
- Grenville Kent (born 1965), Australian academic, film producer, and Christian author
- Guy Kent (born 1988), American actor
- Harry Kent (architect) (1852–1938), Anglo-Australian architect
- Harry Kent (cyclist) (1947–2021), New Zealand cyclist
- Harry Kent (footballer) (1879–1948), English footballer
- Heaberht of Kent, King of Kent
- Heather Paige Kent (born 1969), American actress
- Henri Koch-Kent (1905–1999), Luxembourgish publicist, author
- Herman O. Kent (1884–?), American politician
- Hillary Pugh Kent, American politician
- Hlothhere of Kent (died 685), King of Kent
- Homer Kent (born 1926), American theologian
- Honorius of Kent (died c. 1210), English priest

== I–J ==
- Jack Kent (illustrator) (1920–1985), American illustrator
- Jack Kent (politician) (1870–1946), British politician
- Jacob Ford Kent (1835–1918), American general
- James Kent (chef), American chef
- James Kent (composer) (1700–1776), English organist and composer
- James Kent (jurist) (1763–1847), American legal scholar for whose family Kent, New York, is named
- James C. Kent (born 1941), Canadian judge
- James Tyler Kent (1849–1916), American physician
- Jane Kent (born 1952), American artist and professor of printmaking
- Jason Kent (born 1980), Australian rugby player
- Jasper Kent (born 1968), English author and composer
- Jean Kent (1921–2013), British actress
- Jeff Kent (born 1968), LA Dodgers baseball player
- Jennifer Kent (born 1969), Australian filmmaker
- Jim Kent (born 1960), American scientist
- Jim Kent (politician) (1885–1970), New Zealand politician
- Joan of Kent (1328–1385), Princess of Wales
- Joey Kent (born 1974), American football player
- John Kent (died 1413) (died 1413), English politician
- John Kent (died 1630) (1559–1630), English politician
- John Kent (cartoonist) (1937–2003), New Zealand cartoonist
- John Kent (Newfoundland politician) (1805–1872), Premier of Newfoundland
- John Kent (numismatist) (1928–2000), British numismatist
- John A. Kent (1914–1985), Canadian fighter ace
- John Rodolphus Kent (died 1837), British naval officer and trader
- Jon Kent (cricketer) (born 1979), South African cricketer
- Jonathan Kent (director) (born 1946), English theatre director
- Jonathan Kent (cricketer) (born 1979), English cricketer
- Jordan Kent (born 1984), American football player
- Joseph Kent (1779–1837), governor, US senator, and congressman from Maryland
- Judith Kent (born 1956), American business executive and philanthropist
- Julia Kent, Canadian musician
- Julie Kent (diver) (born 1965), Australian diver
- Julie Kent (dancer) (born 1969), American ballerina

== K–M ==
- Kelvin Kent, pseudonym of Henry Kuttner
- Kelvin Kent (mountaineer), British mountaineer
- Kenneth Kent (1892–1963), British actor
- Kenneth Kent (cricketer) (1901–1974), English cricketer
- Kevin Kent (born 1965), English footballer
- Klark Kent (graffiti artist) (born 1973), German graffiti artist and music producer
- Larry Kent (actor) (1900–1967), American actor
- Larry Kent (filmmaker) (born 1937), Canadian filmmaker
- Lewis Kent (1927–2014), Australian politician
- Louis Kent, American poet
- Louise Andrews Kent (1886–1969), American author
- Luther Kent (1948–2024), American musician
- Marion Kent (died 1500), English businessperson and property manager
- Marshall Kent (actor) (1908–1985), American actor
- Marshall Kent (bowler) (born 1992), American ten-pin bowler
- Martin Kent (born 1953), Australian cricketer
- Marvin Kent (1816–1908), American businessman and namesake of Kent, Ohio
- Mary Kent, English actress
- Mary Lou Kent (1921–1981), American politician
- Matt Kent (born 1977), American writer
- Matthew Kent (born 1980), American baseball player
- Maury Kent (1885–1966), American athlete and coach
- Melanie Taylor Kent, American artist
- Michael Kent (businessman) (1941–2018), Australian politician and businessman
- Michael Kent (comedian and magician) (b. 1979), American comedian and magician
- Michael Kent (computer specialist), American statistician
- Prince Michael of Kent (born 1942), British prince
- Princess Michael of Kent (born 1945), British princess
- Mona Kent (1909–1990), American writer
- Moss Kent (1766–1838), US congressman from New York
- Muhtar Kent (born 1952), Turkish businessman
- Mul of Kent (died 687), King of Kent

== N–R ==
- Nathaniel Kent (1737–1810), English writer
- Necdet Kent (1911–2002), Turkish diplomat
- Nick Kent (born 1951), British musician
- Norm Kent (1949–2023), American lawyer and activist
- Norman A. Kent (born 1956), American cinematographer
- Nun of Kent (1506–1534), English nun
- Octa of Kent (c. 500–543), King of Kent
- Oisc of Kent, King of Kent
- Oswine of Kent, King of Kent
- Paul Kent (actor) (1930–2011), American actor
- Paul Kent (journalist) (born 1969), Australian journalist and former rugby player
- Paul Kent (swimmer) (born 1972), New Zealand swimmer
- Paula Kent (1931–2014), American businesswoman
- Percy Edward Kent (1913–1986), British geologist
- Peter Kent (born 1943), Canadian journalist
- Peter Kent (singer) (born 1948), German singer and producer
- Philip A. Kent, American political consultant
- Philip I. Kent, American media executive
- Ralph S. Kent (1878–1949), American football coach
- Rashod Kent (born 1980), American athlete
- Reg Kent (born 1944), Canadian ice hockey player
- Regina Kent (1969–1999), Hong Kong actress
- Richard Kent (disambiguation)
- Robert Kent (actor) (1908–1955), American actor
- Robert Craig Kent (1828–1905), American attorney and political figure
- Robert E. Kent (1911–1984), American film producer
- Robert John Kent (1835–1893), Newfoundland and Labrador politician
- Ralph S. Kent, American football coach
- Robert F. Kent (1911–1982), American politician
- Robert Thurston Kent (1880–1947), American mechanical engineer
- Rockwell Kent (1882–1971), American artist
- Roger Kent (1906–1980), American lawyer
- Roland Grubb Kent (1877–1952), American linguist
- Rolfe Kent (born 1963), British composer
- Ron Kent (1931–2018), American woodturner
- Ronald Kent Jr. (born 1999), American football player
- Ryan Kent (born 1996), English footballer

== S–T ==
- Samuel Kent (MP) (1683–1759), British politician
- Samuel B. Kent (born 1949), American judge
- Sarah Kent (born 1947), British journalist
- Saul Kent, American activist
- Scott Kent, Canadian politician
- Sean Kent (born 1974), American comedian
- Sherman Kent (1903–1986), American historian
- Sigered of Kent, King of Kent
- Simon Gipps-Kent (1958–1987), British actor
- Simon Kent (born 1970), British sculptor
- Stacey Kent (born 1968), American musician
- Stephen Kent (musician), Australian musician
- Stephen A. Kent, Canadian sociologist
- Stephen Kent (chemist) (born 1945), American chemist
- Steve Kent (politician) (born 1978), Canadian politician
- Steve Kent (baseball) (born 1978), German-born baseball player
- Steven Kent (baseball) (born 1989), Australian professional baseball player
- Steven Kent (swimmer) (born 1988), New Zealand swimmer
- Steven Kent (television producer), American television producer
- Steven L. Kent, American writer
- Susan Kent (actress) (born 1974), Canadian actress
- Ted J. Kent (1901–1986), American film editor
- Terry Kent (footballer) (born 1939), English footballer
- Terry Kent (canoeist) (born 1962), American canoeist
- Thelma Rene Kent (1899–1946), New Zealand photographer
- Thomas Kent (priest), English priest
- Thomas Kent (1865–1916), Irish nationalist
- Thomas Worrall Kent (1922–2011), Canadian journalist
- Tim Kent, American painter
- Tom Kent (rugby) (1864–1928), English rugby player
- Tom Kent, American radio personality
- Trevor Kent (1940–1989), Australian actor
- Tyler Kent (1911–1988), American diplomat

== U–Z ==
- Victoria Kent (1898–1987), Spanish politician and lawyer
- Walter Kent (1911–1994), American composer
- Walter George Kent (1858–1938), British businessman
- Wihtred of Kent (c. 670–725), King of Kent
- Wilfred Kent (1924–2010), English rugby player
- William Kent (c. 1685–1748), English architect
- William Kent (Irish politician), Irish politician
- William Kent (jurist) (c. 1881–1941), Norwegian jurist
- William Kent (Royal Navy officer) (1760–1812), British naval officer
- William Kent (U.S. Congressman) (1864–1928), US congressman from California
- William H. Kent (1823–1889), American politician
- William Richard Kent (1905–1964), Canadian politician
- William T. Kent (1886–1945), American actor
- Willie Kent (1936–2006), American musician
- Willis Kent (1878–1966), American film producer
- W.J. Kent (1860–1943), Canadian politician
- W. Wallace Kent (1916–1973), American judge

== Fictional characters ==
- Ariella Kent, DC Comics character and Superman's daughter
- Bethlehem Kent, a recurring character in Crabtree Mystery
- Brian Kent, a medieval hero known as the Silent Knight
- Clark Kent, the secret identity of Superman
- Chris Kent, Superman's adopted son
- Conner Kent, a clone of Superman and Lex Luthor
- Gabriel Kent, a character in The Bill
- Jonathan and Martha Kent, Superman's adoptive parents
- Jon Lane Kent, the son of Superman and Lois Lane from an alternate future
- Jonathan Samuel Kent, the present-day son of Superman and Lois Lane
- The Kents, fictional characters from The Kent Family Chronicles
- Gilbert Kent, fictional characters from Hayate the Combat Butler

== See also ==
- Kent (given name)
- Kant (surname)
- Cant (surname)
- Kante (surname)
- Kantor (surname)
- Cantor (surname)
