= James Kent =

James Kent may refer to:

- James Kent (jurist) (1763–1847), American jurist and legal scholar
- James Kent (composer) (1700–1776), English composer
- James Kent, better known as Perturbator, French electronic/synthwave musician
- James Tyler Kent (1849–1916), American physician and pioneer of homeopathy
- Jim Kent (born 1960), American research scientist and computer programmer
- James Kent (chef) (1978/79–2024), American chef and winner of Bocuse d'Or USA 2010
- Jim Kent (politician) (1885–1970), New Zealand politician of the Labour Party
- James C. Kent (born 1941), judge in the Canadian province of Ontario
- James M. Kent (1872–1939), Newfoundland lawyer, judge and politician
- Jim Kent, fictional character on the TV series The Strain played by Sean Astin
- James Kent (consultant), British management consultant
- James Kent (director), TV and film director
