= Kenty =

Kenty is an American surname. Notable people with the name include:

- Clayton Kenty, Northern Mariana Islander sprinter
- Hilmer Kenty, American former WBA lightweight champion

== See also ==
- Kent (surname)
- McKenty
- Kenty Creek (disambiguation)
