= Matthew Kent (disambiguation) =

Matthew Kent or Matt Kent may refer to:

- Matt Kent (born 1992), American baseball pitcher
- Matthew Kent (born 1980), Australian baseball player
- Wheeler Antabanez (born 1977), alter-ego and pen name for American writer Matt Kent

== See also ==
- Kent (surname)
