= Charles Kent =

Charles Kent may refer to:

- Charles Kent (actor) (1852–1923), silent film actor and director
- Charles Kent (English writer) (1823–1902), English poet, biographer, and journalist
- Charles Kent (Norwegian writer) (1880–1938), Norwegian writer and literary critic
- Charles Kent (rugby union) (1953–2005), English rugby player
- Charles Foster Kent (1867–1925), American Old Testament scholar
- Sir Charles Kent, 1st Baronet (1743?–1811), British landowner and MP
- Charles W. Kent (1860–1917), American scholar
- Charles Kent, a character in the play Alibi

== See also ==
- Charlie Kent, a character in the 2015 film Infini
