= Kent (given name) =

Kent is a male given name. It is also often a surname (see Kent (surname).) Notable people with the name include:

== People ==
- Kent Benson (born 1954), American former collegiate and professional basketball player
- Kent C. Berridge (born 1957), American academic
- Kent Broadhurst (born 1940), American actor, playwright, screenwriter and painter
- Kent Brown (disambiguation)
- Kent Cheng (born 1951), Hong Kong actor and director
- Kent Emanuel (born 1992), American professional baseball pitcher
- Kent Haruf (1943–2014), American novelist
- Kent Henry (1948–2009), American guitarist and songwriter
- Kent Hrbek (born 1960), former American Major League Baseball player
- Kent Hughes (disambiguation)
- Kent Jones (disambiguation)
- Kent Kirk (born 1948), Danish businessman and politician
- Kent Lee (admiral) (1923–2017), Vice Admiral of the United States Navy
- Kent T. Lundgren (1914–1986), American pharmacist and politician
- Kent Marmon, American politician
- Kent McCord (born 1942), American actor
- Kent Nagano (born 1951), American conductor
- Kent Roe, American politician
- Kent Rogers (1923–1944), American actor
- Kent Smith (1907–1985), American actor
- Kent Tong (born 1958), Hong Kong actor
- Kent Washington (born 1956), American basketball player
- Kent Williams (disambiguation)

== Characters ==
- Kent, a character in the animated series Adventure Time
- Kent, a fictional character from the tactical role-playing game Fire Emblem: The Blazing Blade
- Kent Brockman, a fictional character from the animated television series The Simpsons
- Kent Mansley, a main antagonist from the animated science fiction film The Iron Giant
- Kent Nelson, a fictional superhero from DC Comics
