= Kento =

- Gender: Male
- Language: Japanese

Origin
- Origin: Kento
- Meaning: Smart person, cure for depression, happiness, rising up etc. Other meanings may depend on the kanji used

Kento (written: 健人, 賢人, 建人, 顕人, 健斗, 賢斗, 憲斗, 絢斗 or 遣都) is a masculine Japanese given name. It is also the Japanese pronunciation of the English name Kent (ケント). Notable people with the name include:

- Kento Fukuda (福田 健人; born 1990), Japanese footballer
- Kento Handa (半田 健人; born 1984), Japanese actor
- Kento Hayashi (林 遣都; born 1990), Japanese actor
- Kento Hori (堀 健人; born 1982), Japanese footballer
- Kento Kaku (賀来 賢人; born 1989), Japanese actor
- Kento Kato (加藤 健人; born 1995), Japanese footballer
- Kento Masaki (正木 健人; born 1987), Japanese Paralympic judoka
- Kento Miyahara (宮原 健斗; born 1989), Japanese professional wrestler
- Kento Miyaura (宮浦 健人; born 1999), Japanese volleyball player
- Kento Momota (桃田 賢斗; born 1994), Japanese badminton player
- Kento Nagayama (永山 絢斗; born 1989), Japanese actor
- Kento Nakajima (中島 健人; born 1994), Japanese idol
- Kento Nakamura (中村 健人; born 1991), Japanese figure skater
- Kento Ono (小野 健斗; born 1989), Japanese actor
- Kento Sakuyama (作山 憲斗; born 1990), Japanese ski jumper
- Kento Shiratani (白谷 建人; born 1989), Japanese footballer
- Kento Sugiyama (杉山 賢人; born 1968), Japanese baseball player
- Kento Tsurumaki (弦巻 健人; born 1987), Japanese footballer
- Kento Yachi (矢地 健人; born 1988), Japanese baseball player
- Kento Yamazaki (山﨑 賢人; born 1994), Japanese actor
