= List of Waverley/Melbourne Reds players =

This is a list of all players that played for the Waverley Reds and later the Melbourne Reds between 1989 and 1999 in the Australian Baseball League.

- – A native born Australian, who played for the Waverley Baseball Club.
- (Australia) – A native-born Australian.
- (United States) – Played with the Reds as a US import.

== Pitchers ==
Origin	Name	Games	ERA	Wins	Saves	Innings Pitched	Starts	Complete Games	K2s
(United States)	Pat Ahearne	9	3.36	3	0	56.1	9	0	43
(United States)	Mike Anderson	11	2.58	6	0	66.1	11	1	48
(United States)	Jason Beverlin	14	6.22	2	0	72.1	14	3	67
(United States)	Dirk Blair	19	3.73	14	0	113.1	19	6	74
(Australia)	Jason Blewjas	5	18.0	0	0	5.0	0	0	2
(United States)	Jeff Bock	3	13.50	1	0	4.0	0	0	0
(United States)	John Box	15	6.93	1	0	50.2	11	0	29
(United States)	Charles Brown	8	4.85	1	0	42.2	7	2	27
(Australia)	Rohan Chapman	1	18.00	0	0	2.0	0	0	1
(United States)	Barry Chiles	15	4.08	7	1	57.1	7	3	53
(Australia)	Michael Crooks	6	3.00	0	0	6.0	0	0	0
Waverley Baseball Club	Phil Dale	104	2.71	46	17	529.00	67	38	351
(Australia)	Jon Deeble	10	5.56	4	0	56.2	10	2	34
(Australia)	Ben Donald	12	6.35	0	0	17.0	0	0	8
(United States)	Darrell Einertson	9	6.20	1	0	40.2	9	1	25
(Australia)	Matthew Ellis	7	3.77	0	1	14.1	2	1	7
(United States)	Ben Ford	8	4.50	2	0	42.0	8	3	31
(Australia)	Matthew Gourlay	37	8.01	5	4	73.0	9	3	48
(United States)	Carl Grovom	13	2.73	7	0	82.1	13	2	70
(Australia)	Stuart Harben	6	3.91	1	0	23.0	3	0	20
(United States)	Tommy Harrison	5	5.89	2	0	18.1	4	0	9
(Australia)	Gavin Hockey	15	4.24	3	0	40.1	3	2	25
Waverley Baseball Club	Lee Hogan	46	5.91	2	1	77.2	5	2	40
(Australia)	Robert Hogan	65	4.66	12	4	172.0	21	7	103
Waverley Baseball Club	Shane Hogan	1	9.00	0	0	1.0	0	0	0
(Australia)	Brad Hubbard	7	3.00	0	0	9.0	0	0	3
(Australia)	Cameron Hubbard	3	16.20	0	0	1.2	0	0	1
(Australia)	Rikki Johnston	15	8.28	2	0	25.0	2	0	14
(Australia)	Peter Jose	7	7.50	0	0	6.0	0	0	8
(Australia)	Richard King	19	2.95	2	1	60.0	7	1	26
(Australia)	Ben Mann	7	7.29	1	0	21.0	5	0	12
(United States)	Quinn Marsh	5	16.71	2	0	7.0	2	0	2
Waverley Baseball Club	Heath Martin	21	7.42	0	0	26.2	1	0	13
(Australia)	Warren May	77	4.93	17	1	217.1	20	6	128
(United States)	Dave McAuliffe	14	5.76	2	3	25.0	2	0	23
(Australia)	Danny McGrath	14	5.35	2	0	33.2	3	2	15
Waverley Baseball Club	David McWatters	13	5.71	1	0	52.0	7	2	22
(Australia)	Damian Moss	13	3.72	4	0	67.2	12	2	58
(Australia)	Micheal Nakamura	29	4.47	4	4	46.1	3	1	35
(Australia)	Tim O'Meara	7	6.00	1	0	12.0	1	0	6
(United States)	Michael Place	4	4.30	2	0	23.0	4	1	13
(United States)	Denis Pujals	8	4.12	3	0	39.1	8	0	25
(Australia)	Brendan Ratcliffe	26	2.56	3	2	31.2	0	0	23
Waverley Baseball Club	Mark Respondek	63	3.69	11	7	165.2	16	5	125
(United States)	Greg Resz	8	2.27	4	0	43.2	8	1	31
(United States)	Carlos Reyes	14	2.02	9	0	98.0	14	6	74
(United States)	Darren Ritter	13	3.52	4	0	76.2	13	2	46
(United States)	Matt Ryan	4	3.60	1	0	20.0	4	1	15
(United States)	Scott Ryder	15	3.80	8	0	92.1	15	4	71
(Australia)	Troy Scoble	1	13.50	0	0	2.0	0	0	1
Waverley Baseball Club	Simon Sheldon-Collins	82	4.07	32	1	380.2	66	16	239
(Australia)	David Simpson	31	6.43	7	2	70.0	3	1	33
Waverley Baseball Club	Andrew Smith	1	9.00	0	0	1.0	0	0	0
(Australia)	Ben Smith	16	6.23	2	1	52.0	6	3	27
(United States)	Sloan Smith	1	9.00	0	0	2.0	1	0	1
(United States)	Aaron Turnier	15	4.24	6	0	74.1	15	1	48
(Australia)	Lucas Van Raalte	13	5.15	4	0	50.2	6	1	41
(United States)	Joey Viera	7	0.00	3	1	13.2	0	0	10
(Australia)	David White	32	5.42	9	5	116.1	9	4	76
(United States)	John Wilder	6	8.68	0	0	18.2	4	0	11
(Australia)	Flynn Wilkinson	7	8.25	0	0	12.0	0	0	3
(Australia)	Greg Wiltshire	4	9.45	0	0	6.2	0	0	4
Origin	Name	Games	ERA	Wins	Saves	Innings pitched	Starts	Complete games	K2s

== Hitters ==
Origin	Name	Games	Batting average	At Bats	Hits	RBIs	Home Runs	Stolen Bases	Walks
(United States)	Chris Ashby	18	.314	51	16	18	6	1	18
(Australia)	Myles Barnden	315	.266	961	256	134	29	8	117
(United States)	Brian Becker	43	.241	158	38	28	7	0	8
(United States)	Pete Beeler	79	.345	293	101	60	10	9	21
Waverley Baseball Club	David Buckthorpe	161	.283	502	142	80	20	24	74
Waverley Baseball Club	Adam Burton	226	.305	669	204	149	51	64	118
Waverley Baseball Club	Ron Carothers	177	.297	644	191	118	24	19	47
(Australia)	Mark Cater	16	.125	24	3	2	0	0	3
(Australia)	Haydn Chinn	40	.260	123	32	10	1	8	11
Waverley Baseball Club	David Clarkson	342	.300	1061	318	197	33	13	142
Waverley Baseball Club	Phil Dale	1	.500	2	1	0	0	0	0
(Australia)	Scott Dawes	304	.268	857	230	129	22	7	117
(Australia)	Jon Deeble	63	.333	186	62	30	3	5	34
Waverley Baseball Club	Geoff Dunn	64	.255	188	48	31	4	1	17
(Australia)	Brendan Edwards	31	.293	58	17	4	0	4	9
Waverley Baseball Club	Andrew Ferguson	6	.333	12	4	1	0	0	2
(Australia)	Tim Fisher	5	.111	9	1	1	0	0	1
(Australia)	Aaron Harvey	184	.294	520	153	52	5	47	38
(United States)	Lee Heath	48	.238	168	40	15	1	8	10
(Australia)	Michael Herman	4	.286	7	2	1	0	0	3
(Australia)	Robert Hogan	1	1.000	1	1	0	0	0	0
Waverley Baseball Club	Shane Hogan	163	.289	488	141	100	30	10	53
(Australia)	Cameron Hubbard	15	.258	31	8	2	0	0	4
(Australia)	Ian Hubble	124	.287	314	90	31	1	7	78
(United States)	Greg Jelks	15	.364	55	20	13	2	1	2
(Australia)	Matthew Kent	11	.087	23	2	1	0	0	1
(Australia)	Craig Kernick	45	.318	148	47	23	1	0	12
(Australia)	David Kim	31	.292	48	14	5	0	3	7
(Australia)	Glynn Kimberley	7	.071	14	1	0	0	0	1
(United States)	John Knott	58	.220	164	36	22	7	16	28
(United States)	Brian Kowitz	40	.302	139	42	20	2	26	32
(Australia)	Mark Linger	50	.253	186	47	24	0	15	30
Waverley Baseball Club	Travis Loft	6	.214	14	3	2	0	0	0
Waverley Baseball Club	Steven McGrady	13	.118	17	2	0	0	0	1
(Australia)	David Nilsson	65	.365	192	70	63	18	7	32
(United States)	Kevin O'Connor	103	.283	332	94	55	6	32	40
(United States)	Aldo Pecorilli	24	.264	91	24	15	4	1	3
(United States)	Matt Quatraro	42	.292	154	45	20	4	6	14
(Australia)	Simon Ratcliffe	14	.107	28	3	2	0	1	3
Waverley Baseball Club	Glenn Reeves	300	.249	839	209	84	12	37	128
(United States)	Raul Rodarte	20	.288	66	19	13	5	1 7	
(United States)	Cody Samuel	29	.231	91	21	8	1	0	8
Waverley Baseball Club	M. Sheldon-Collins	327	.275	1110	305	157	19	46	89
(United States)	Derek Shumpert	40	.295	129	38	32	3	6	22
(Australia)	David Simpson	1	.000	0	0	0	0	0	0
Waverley Baseball Club	Richard Sisson	53	.293	140	41	29	3	4	15
(United States)	Marshall Skinner	6	.267	15	4	4	0	0	1
Waverley Baseball Club	Andrew Smith	35	.297	74	22	21	2	7	10
(Australia)	Ben Smith	7	.000	1	0	0	0	0	0
(United States)	Sloan Smith	27	.167	84	14	4	1	1	10
Waverley Baseball Club	Andrew Spencer	123	.268	325	87	54	12	9	27
Waverley Baseball Club	Jeff Spencer	133	.252	413	104	73	14	19	32
(United States)	Pedro Swann	53	.236	178	42	24	5	8	7
Waverley Baseball Club	David Thiele	3	.167	6	1	1	0	0	0
(Australia)	Andrew Utting	65	.189	164	31	20	1	1	17
(Australia)	Ben Utting	251	.236	751	177	86	10	33	64
(United States)	Mike Warner	41	.235	136	32	10	0	10	17
Waverley Baseball Club	Paul Weichard	50	.213	94	20	7	1	3	12
(Australia)	Michael Wells	5	.143	7	1	0	0	0	0
(Australia)	Darren White	83	.266	256	68	50	18	7	37
Waverley Baseball Club	Justin Whitford	102	.214	224	48	30	10	6	20
(United States)	Luke Wilcox	25	.244	78	19	10	2	5	11
(United States)	Juan Williams	44	.231	143	33	13	2	6	12
(United States)	Carlos Yedo	28	.262	84	22	14	0	1	8
Origin	Name	Games	Batting average	At bats	Hits	RBIs	Home runs	Stolen bases	Walks

== See also ==
- Melbourne Reds
- Australian Baseball League (1989–99)
