= Simon Kent (disambiguation) =

Simon Kent is a sculptor.

Simon Kent may also refer to:

- Simon Kent (MP) (fl. 1421), alias Simon Porter, MP and mayor
- Simon Kent (playwright) (1907–1992), pseudonym of British playwright and novelist Max Catto

== See also ==
- Simon Gipps-Kent (1958–1987), English theatre and film actor
