= Self-report sexual risk behaviors =

Factors affecting the validity and accuracy of self-reported sexual health behaviors

Self-report sexual risk behaviors are a cornerstone of reproductive health–related research, particularly when related to assessing risk-related outcomes such as pregnancy or acquisition of sexually transmitted diseases (STDs) such as HIV. Despite their frequency of use, the utility of self-report measures to provide an accurate account of actual behavior is questioned, and methods of enhancing their accuracy should be a critical focus when administering such measures. Self-reported assessments of sexual behavior are prone to a number of measurement concerns which may affect the reliability and validity of a measure, ranging from a participant's literacy level and comprehension of behavioral terminology to recall biases and self-presentation (or confidentiality concerns resulting from stigmatization of the behavior in question).

Therefore, the decision to incorporate a self-report measure of sexual risk behaviors is often one of practicality. Self-report measures are both inexpensive and more feasible than behavioral observation given the private nature of most sexual risk behaviors. To this end, the validity of self-reported sexual risk measures can be strengthened by the level of concordant answers obtained from sexual partners or through more objective measures of risk (such as the incidence of pregnancy, HIV or other STDs).

It is important to consider the way in which measures of self-reported sexual risk behaviors will be collected during the research development phase. Frequently self-report measures are self-administered but may also be elicited from an interviewer, either face-to-face or by telephone; such modalities help address literacy and comprehension confounds but may increase the potential for self-presentation bias. The delivery of risk behavior assessments via the internet or computer can increase a sense of privacy, and may reduce self-presentation biases.

In addition, a study was conducted by Durant, Carey and Schroder in which 358 college students were examined to see effects of anonymity and confidentiality on responses. The confidentiality group, the members were asked to provide their personal information however were assured that they would be kept confidential. Whereas, in the anonymity group the members were simply not asked to provide their personal information. The results indicated that members of the confidentiality group answered much lower frequencies for questions about their health risk behaviors, and also had many more non-responses. In conclusion, this study demonstrated the vital value of collecting sexual behavior self-reports through a process of anonymity.

Similarly, it is important to select a self-report sexual risk measure which meets the study's assessment needs. Dichotomous (yes/no) evaluation of engagement in risk behaviors (risk screening), assessing the level of risk via frequency of engagement in risk behaviors (risk assessments) and detailed event-level data related to the co-occurrence of other factors (e.g., alcohol use or primary versus secondary partners) that may facilitate engaging in risk behaviors (risk-event data) are unequivocal, serving very distinct functions in evaluating self-reported risk behavior.

Attention should also be paid to the period of time over which self-reported risk measures ask individuals to recall the occurrence and frequency of engaging in risk behavior; generally, recalling frequency of risk behaviors over a period of approximately three months supports recall accuracy.

== The interrelationship of self-reported sexual risk behavior and STI status ==
The self-reported STI-like symptoms and unsafe sexual behavior taken together as a predictor of confirmed STIs improve the sensitivity to a significantly greater degree (χ 2 = 2.83, p < 0.05) as compared to the sensitivity of self-reported STI-like symptoms or unsafe sexual behavior alone as a predictor of confirmed STIs. In addition, the consistency of self-report was found to vary among socio-demographic and behaviorally defined sub-groups. These results provide preliminary support for the importance of population-based surveys, which collect all the three types of data such as reported behavior, symptoms and laboratory confirmed STIs for a full understanding of sexual risk and STIs and for identification of sub-groups within communities that vary in their ability to identify STI symptoms.

== See also ==
- Safe sex
