= Thine, O Lord, is the greatness =

Anthem by James Kent

- Anthem by James Kent
- Genre: Sacred choral music
- Text: 1 Chronicles 29:11
- Language: English
- Published: 1905
- Scoring: SATB choir; organ

"Thine, O Lord, is the greatness" is an anthem for four-part choir and organ by the English composer James Kent, a setting of a verse from the First Book of Chronicles.

The text is a verse from the First Book of Chronicles:

Thine, O Lord, is the greatness,
and the pow'r, and the glory,
and the victory, and the majesty,
for all that is in the heav'n
and the earth is thine.
Thine is the Kingdom, O Lord,
and thou art exalted as head over all.

— 1 Chronicles 29:11

Kent set "Thine, O Lord, is the greatness" for a choir of four voice parts and organ. The anthem was included in The Anthem Book, a collection of the United Free Church of Scotland, in 1905, as No. 4.
