= Kenty Creek =

Kenty Creek may refer to:

- Kenty Creek (Alaska), a stream in Alaska
- Kenty Creek (Mississippi), a stream in Mississippi
