= List of Yu-Gi-Oh! 5D's chapters =

First volume cover

This article is a list of chapters in the Yu-Gi-Oh! 5D's manga series, written by Masahiro Hikokubo and illustrated by Masashi Sato. It was published by Shueisha and was serialized by V-Jump starting on August 21, 2009. The first volume, collecting the initial eight chapters, was released on April 30, 2010. Eight further volumes followed before the series concluded. It is one of several Yu-Gi-Oh! spin-off titles to have been serialised in V-Jump magazine and is based on the anime of the same name.

Much like the preceding Yu-Gi-Oh! GX manga, the narrative of Hikokubo's series differs from the Yu-Gi-Oh 5D's anime and features new characters alongside characters from the anime.

== Volumes list ==
No.	Title	Original release date	English release date
1	Riding Duelist, Yusei!! / Yusei, Turbo Duelist!! Kettō Shissō-sha, Yūsei!! (決闘疾走者、遊星！！)	April 30, 2010; 978-4-08-870063-2	July 5, 2011; 978-1-4215-3963-8
Ride 1: "Riding Duelist, Yusei!!" (決闘疾走者、遊星！！, Kettō Shissō-sha, Yūsei!!) / "Yusei, Turbo Duelist!!"; Ride 2: "Dark Feel!!" (闇のフィール！！, Yami no Fīru!!) / "Shadow Sense!!"; Ride 3: "Lord of the Underworld" (冥界の主！！, Meikai no Omo!!); Ride 4: "Settlement with Darkness" (闇との決着, Yami to no Ketchaku) / "A Showdown with Darkness"; Ride 5: "Absolute King!!" (絶対王者！！, Zettai Ōja!!) / "The King!!"; Ride 6: ""Shackle"...!" (「枷」。。。！, "Kase"...!) / ""Shackle"...!!"; Ride 7: "Queen of Queen" (クイーン・オブ・クイーン, Kuīn obu Kuīn) / "Queen of Queens"; Ride 8: "One-Shot Run" (一撃疾走, Ichigeki Shissō)
Best Turbo Duelist of Satellite, Yusei Fudo duels Sect Ijuin; impressed with almost losing, Yusei calls Sect his rival. Sect performs the Sunset Salute, hoping the legendary Skeleton Knight will appear and grant him a rare card. Unfortunately, Skeleton Knight is less than impressed with who has called him; Yusei Duels the Skeleton Knight, suffering his powerful "Dark Sense". Though successful, Yusei's Duel Runner and Sect are in bad shape. Tryting to take Sect to a hospital, Yusei is forced into a Turbo Duel by cruel egomaniac Jack Atlas, the King of Turbo of Duels. Yusei loses due his Duel Runner breaking, feeling frustrated that he lost. He is offered the chance to participate in the D1 Grand Prix by the mysterious Lazar, which is a tournament to see who faces Jack. Yusei later faces off against Akiza Izinski, the best Duelsit of Queen's Academy and fellow Duelist beaten by Jack, in a one shot run; the end result shows Yusei that he needs to develop a new Sense to beat Jack. At the same time, Sect awakens from a nightmare about the Skeleton Knight to discover a card in his hand that doesn't belong to him.
2	Start!! D1 GP!! / The D1 Grand Prix Begins!! Kaimaku!! Dī Wan Jī Pī!! (開幕！！ D1GP！！)	December 29, 2010; 978-4-08-870172-1	February 7, 2012; 978-1-4215-4088-7
Ride 9: "Start!! D1 GP!!" (開幕！！ D1GP！！, Kaimaku!! Dī Wan Jī Pī!!) / The D1 Grand Prix Begins!!; Ride 10: "Clashing Pride!!" (激突する誇り！！, Gekitotsu suru Hokori!!); Ride 11: "Feel VS Feel!!" (フィールVSフィール！！, Fīru Bāsasu Fīru!!) / "Sense VS Sense!!"; Ride 12: "Psychic Duelists!!" (聖魂決闘者！！, Seikon Kettō-sha!!); Ride 13: "Psychic VS Psychic" (聖魂VS聖魂, Seikon Tai Seikon); Ride 14: "Rivals!!" (好敵手たち！！, Kōtekishu-tachi!!); Ride 15: "Secret Maneuvers...!!" (暗躍。。。！！, Anyaku...!!) / "Dark Maneuvers...!!"; Ride 16: "Flight!!" (飛翔！！, Hishō!!)
The D1 Grand Prix has started! Yusei takes on Greiger in a battle of Sense, and wins with his new Cross Sense. Akiza takes on fellow psychic duelist, Sherry LeBlanc, who can cheat by using her powers to see Akiza's cards through her eyes. Akiza makes the desperate choice of keeping her eyes closed and relying on her prediction abilities, winning the match. Rex Goodwin, Chairman of the city and Jack's foster father, has secret plans for Akiza. Crow "The Black Whirlwind" Hogan faces off against Bolt Tanner, who summons a powerful machine monster on his first turn; however, Crow turns the tables with a double Synchro Summon and wiping out Bolt's LP in one turn. Kalin Kessler and Officer Trudge, also move on to the next round.
3	Duel Dragons!! Kettō Ryū!! (決闘竜！！)	September 2, 2011; 978-4-08-870323-7	October 2, 2012; 978-1-4215-4264-5
Ride 17: "Quickening...!!" (胎動。。。！！, Taidō...!!) / "Omens!!"; Ride 18: "The Handless Combo!!" (無手札必殺！！, Mu Tefuda Hissatsu!!); Ride 19: "Triumph Card..." (切り札。。。, Kirifuda...) / "Trump Card...!!"; Ride 20: "Shadow Card!!" (闇のカード！！, Yami no Kādo!!); Ride 21: "Separation...!!" (別離。。。！！, Betsuri...!!); Ride 22: "Duel Dragons!!" (決闘竜！！, Kettō Ryū!!); Ride 23: "Twin Duelists!!" (双子の決闘者！！, Futago no Kettō-sha!!); Ride 24: "Equip vs Equip" (装備vs装備, Sōbi tai Sōbi) / "Equip VS Equip!!"
Sect is attacked by some thugs who want to change the outcome of the tournament, but he beats them back thanks to the darkness of the card he received from Skeleton Knight; Lazar sees this on the monitors, realizing that he made the mistake of thinking it was Yusei that the Skeleton Knight gave the card to. The next phase of the D1 Grand Prix will take place on an island. Yusei and Crow meet the mysterious twins Leo and Luna, who possess two powerful dragon Synchro monsters; unfortunately, these caused also cause any damage from their attacks to materialize.
4	Synchro VS Synchro!! Shinkuro Bāsasu Shinkuro!! (シンクロVSシンクロ!!)	June 4, 2012; 978-4-08-870438-8	April 2, 2013; 978-1-4215-5241-5
Ride 25: ""Overlapping Heart...!!"" (「重なる心…!!」, "Kasa naru Kokoro…!!") / "Sense Upon Sense...!!"; Ride 26: "Premonition of a Fierce Fight...!!" (激戦の予感。。。！！, Gekisen no Yokan...!!); Ride 27: "Synchro VS Synchro!!" (シンクロVSシンクロ！！, Shinkuro Bāsasu Shinkuro!!) / "Synchro VS. Synchro!!"; Ride 28: "Resonance...!!" (共鳴。。。！！, Kyōmei...!!); Ride 29: "Super-Fast Showdown!!" (超速決着！！, Chōsoku Ketchaku!!); Ride 30: "Ancient Duel!!" (古の決闘！！, Inishie no Kettō!!) / "The Ancient Duel Arena!!"; Ride 31: "Jewel Flare Dragon Stardust!!" (閃珖竜スターダスト！！, Senkō Ryū Sutādasuto!!); Ride 32: "Zero Battle!!" (零の攻防！！, Zero no Kōbō!!)
The next part of the D1 Grand Prix has begun. The remaining duelists must acquire Star Tickets that total 12; a "?" ticket has been placed and will be worth as many as the recipient wants to be. At the four star duel ticket, Crow and Yusei are sucked into another plane of reality, where Yusei faces a Duel Priest for Stardust Spark Dragon; Yusei overcomes the miasma coming from the dragon by accepting its feelings. Crow takes off for the "?" ticket, where another Duel Dragon card had been placed and an doppelganger of himself appears to duel him for it.
5	Those We Protect!! Mamoru Beki Mono!! (守るべきモノ！！)	January 4, 2013; 978-4-08-870564-4	November 5, 2013; 978-1-4215-5888-2
Ride 33: "Duel Dragon VS Duel Dragon!!" (決闘竜VS決闘竜！！, Kettō Ryū Tai Kettō Ryū); Ride 34: "Resolution...!!" (決意･･･！！, Ketsui...!!) / "Determination!!"; Ride 35: "Fierce Fight!! Duel Zodiac!!" (激闘！！決闘星宿！！, Gekitō!! Kettō Seishuku!!) / The Battle for the Duel Zodiacs!!; Ride 36: "Rematch!!" (再戦！！, Saisen!!); Ride 37: "Those We Protect!!" (守るべきモノ！！, Mamoru Beki Mono!!); Ride 38: "The Final Chapter Battle!!" (最終章の攻防！！, Sai Shūshō no Kōbō!!); Ride 39: "To The Duel Gate!!" (決闘門へ！！, Kettō-mon e!!)
Yusei duels Leo and Luna, succeeding in destroying Leo's Power Tool Mecha Dragon and freeing him of its miasma. Unfortunately, Luna has embraced a delusion that they are characters in her favorite book and uses Ancient Pixie Dragon's miasma to manipulate Leo into continuing the duel.
6	Escape from the Supreme King of Heaven's Lock!! / The Way to the King of Sky's Lock!! Tenjō Haō e no Michi!! (天錠覇王への血路！！)	August 2, 2013; 978-4-08-870793-8	September 2, 2014; 978-1-4215-6919-2
Ride 40: "Ritual of the Sun and Moon!!" (陰陽祭！！, Onmyō-sai!!) / The Festival of Duality!!; Ride 41: "Duel Sister!!" (決闘巫女！！, Kettō Miko!!) / Duel Priestess!!; Ride 42: "Insect King Sect!!" (蠅王セクト！！, Hae-Ō Sekuto!!) / Fly-Lord Sect!!; Ride 43: "Existing as a Shadow!!" (影の存在！！, Kage no Sonzai!!) / Goodwin's Shadow!!; Ride 44: "Synchro Killer!!" (シンクロキラー！！, Shinkuro Kirā!!); Ride 45: "Escape from the Supreme King of Heaven's Lock!!" (天錠覇王への血路！！, Tenjō Ha-Ō e no Michi!!) / The Way to the King of Sky's Lock!!; Ride 46: "Father and Son Clash!!" (父子激突！！, Fushi Gekitotsu!!) / Father Against Son!!
In the Duel Gate Rex Goodwin and The Skeleton Knight begin the festival of duality using Sect Injuin and Akiza Izinski as their representatives. The two face off in a Turbo Duel in order to determine whether the Ultimate God would be revivied. Although Akiza puts up a good fight Sect proves himself to be stronger and defeats her. Yusei and Jack both enter the Aerial Fortress Seibel but the former is stopped by Lazar who forces him into a duel to save the innocent people he sealed into cards. However Crow appears and challenges Lazar in his place allowing Yusei to go on ahead. Confronting the Skeleton Knight, Yusei learns that he must defeat him and become the King of Sky's Lock in order to battle Sect. The two begin a duel while Jack and Rex have a duel of their own.
7	Last Draw of Destiny!! Unmei no Rasuto Dorō!! (運命のラストドロー！！)	March 4, 2014; 978-4-08-880039-4	March 3, 2015; 978-1-4215-7684-8
Ride 47: "Sprint! The Southern-Sky Corridor!!" (疾走！南天回廊！！, Shissō! Nanten Kairō!!) / "Southern Corridor Sprint!!"; Ride 48: "Fierce Fight of Vicissitudes!!" (激闘流転！！, Gekitō Ruten!!) / "The Tides of Battle!!"; Ride 49: "Raging Stream! The Northern-Sky Corridor!!" (激流！北天回廊！！, Gekiryū! Hokuten Kairō!!) / "Northern Corridor Fury!!"; Ride 50: "Last Draw of Destiny!!" (運命のラストドロー！！, Unmei no Rasuto Dorō!!); Ride 51: "Recollection...!!" (追憶･･･！！, Tsuioku...!!) / Memory...!!; Ride 52: "The Ultimate God Roars!!" (究極神！咆哮！！, Kyūkyoku-shin! Hōkō!!); Ride 53: "Pitch-Black Wings!!" (漆黒の翼！！, Shikkoku no Tsubasa!!) / "Jet Black Wings!!"
The Duels in the Aerial Fortress Seibal continue as Jack is able to triumph over Goodwin while Yusei faces off against the Skeleton Knight. After a long and grueling duel Yusei is able to defeat his opponent who reveals himself to be Roman Goodwin, the older brother of Rex Goodwin. Roman explains his past to Yusei and pleads with him to save his brother before succumbing to his injuries and dying. Afterwards Yusei makes his way to the center of the fortress and confronts Sect.
8	The Feel of Light!! / Light Sense!! Hikari no Fīru!! (光のフィール！！)	October 3, 2014; 978-4-08-880205-3	October 6, 2015; 978-1-4215-8085-2
Ride 54: "Feelings for a Friend...!!" (友への想い･･･！！, Tomo e no Omoi!!) / "Thoughts for a Friend...!!"; Ride 55: "The Crystal of Bonds!!" (絆の結晶！！, Kizuna no Kesshō!!) / "Bond's Reward!!"; Ride 56: "After the Flash...!!" (閃光の先に･･･！！, Senkō no Saki ni...!!) / "Beyond the Flash...!!"; Ride 57: "The Feel of Light!!" (光のフィール！！, Hikari no Fīru!!) / "Light Sense!!"; Ride 58: "Awakening!!" (覚醒！！, Kakusei!!); Ride 59: "The Last Battle!!" (最終決戦！！, Saishū Kessen!!) / "The Final Showdown!!"; Ride 60: "God's Servants!!" (神の僕！！, Kami no Boku!!) / "Deck of a God!!"
As the Duel between Yusei and Sect continues, Yusei is able to reach Sect and destroy his Shadow Miasma by evolving his Sense to a new level. Afterwards the two work together to seal away the Ultimate God. However Rex Goodwin appears and explains that he absorbed the Ultimate God's miasma into himself and proceeds to absorb the energy of the duelists across the world rendering their cards blank. Yusei is unaffected by this and challenges Goodwin to one final duel to decide the fate of the world.
9	Eternal Riding Duelist!! / Eternal Turbo Duelist!! Etānaru Raidingu Dyuerisuto!! (エターナルライディング・デュエリスト！！)	June 4, 2015; 978-4-08-880343-2	April 5, 2016; 978-1-4215-8520-8
Ride 61: "God's Duel!!" (神の決闘！！, Kami no Kettō!!) / "Divine Duel!!"; Ride 62: "Prayer...!!" (祈り･･･！！, Inori...!!) / "Prayers!!"; Ride 63: "The Origin of the Revenge!!" (復讐の原点！！, Fukushū no Genten!!) / "Origin of Revenge!!"; Ride 64: "Transcendence!!" (超越！！, Chōetsu!!) / "Rise Above!!"; Ride 65: "Gathering Light!!" (つどいし光ひかり！！, Tsudoishi Hikari!!); Ride 66: "He Who Wins the Ritual!!" (儀式を制し者！！, Gishiki o Seishi Mono!!) / "Ruler of the Ritual!!"; Bonus: "The Emperor Playoff!!" (統一皇帝決定戦！！, Enperā Ketteisen!!) / "The Duel Emperor Finals!!"; Bonus 2: "Eternal Riding Duelist!!" (エターナルライディング・デュエリスト！！, Etānaru Raidingu Dyuerisuto!!) / "Eternal Turbo Duelist!!"
Yusei finds himself overwhelmed by Goodwin's dueling techniques as he uses the power of the Ultimate God to take control of the Duel Dragons. Just as he is about to lose hope Yusei sees a vision of the past and awakens Stardust's true form as a Synchro Tuner. Uniting all the Duel Dragons together Yusei tunes them all to create Stardust Sifr Divine Dragon and destroys the Ultimate God while dealing a devastating blow to Goodwin. Suddenly Yusei sees another vision and learns it was the Ultimate God who possessed Goodwin and after being released tries to convince Goodwin that he is being manipulated by it. But this proves useless as the Ultimate God takes over Goodwin's body completely. Continuing the Duel the Ultimate God summons forth its true form, Phantasmal Lord Ultimitl Bishbaalkin putting Yusei in a tight situation. However by using the spell card Gathering Light Yusei gathers all the Duel Dragons and the Sense of their holders to severely injure the Ultimate God. By merging his Sense with Stardust Spark Dragon Yusei is able to destroy the Ultimate God, freeing Goodwin and restoring the cards of all the duelists back to normal. One year later Yusei is about face off against Jack in a rematch to settle the scores between them.
