= Kenneth Morgan =

Kenneth Morgan may refer to:

- Kenneth Morgan (Shi'a), American religious leader, academic & author on Islam, see Shi'a Islam (book)
- Kenneth O. Morgan (born 1934), Welsh historian and author
- Kenneth W. Morgan (1908–2011), American scholar of religion
- Dakta Green, born Kenneth Morgan, New Zealand cannabis reform activist
