= Yachi =

Yachi is a surname. Notable people with the surname include:

- Kento Yachi (born 1988), Japanese baseball player
- Shotaro Yachi (born 1944), Japanese diplomat
- Yusuke Yachi (born 1980), Japanese race walker

== Fictional ==
- Hitoka Yachi, the second manager of the Karasuno High School Volleyball Club in Haikyu!!
- Madoka Yachi, a mother of Hitoka Yachi in Haikyū!!
