= Sports betting systems =

Sports betting systems are sets of events that when combined for a particular game for a particular sport represent a profitable betting scenario. Since sports betting involves humans, there is no deterministic edge to the house or the gambler. Systems supposedly allow the gambler to have an edge or an advantage.

Sportsbooks use systems in their analysis to set more accurate odds. Therefore, the novice gambler may believe that using a system will always work, but it is the general consensus that at some point the oddsmakers will have adjusted for the system to make it no longer profitable. Very short-lived systems are called trends. Any single event that estimates a selection to have a higher likelihood of winning is called an angle as they are meant to be used in conjunction with other angles and trends to produce systems.

== Overview ==
Systems can be deceiving. Any sample space can be constrained enough with meaningless criteria to create the illusion of a profitable betting system. For example, a coin can be flipped with heads being home teams and tails being road teams. Heads and tails each have a 50% probability of landing but if the amount of flips is limited to a small number, it is conceivable to create the illusion of predicting heads will come up 75% of the time.

That, and that sportsbooks adjust their odds according to the systems, makes it difficult to follow systems indefinitely. The sportsbooks are slower to adjust the odds in some sports versus other sports depending on the number of games played and the amount of money they take in from bettors.

Betting systems based on statistical analysis have been around for a while, however they have not always been well known. One group that was known for their accurate predictions was called The Computer Group. They formed in Las Vegas in 1980 and successfully wagered on college football and basketball games for years making millions. Michael Kent, co-founder and one of the lesser-known individuals of the group, would use his computer software to run through massive amounts of data, which then provided the group's network of bettors with useful information. The network of bettors would then bet on games in which they had a statistical advantage (as determined by the software). Billy Walters, who was profiled on 60 Minutes, was the most famous member of the group.

Sports betting systems have not always been well trusted or liked by bettors. The stigma is that a sporting event has too many intangibles that a machine can't predict. However, things have begun to change recently as owners of teams have begun to take notice of the value in statistics. Front offices have hired noted statistical analysts such as Jeff Sagarin.

Books like Sabermetrics by Bill James, and Basketball on Paper by Dean Oliver, have begun to bring detailed statistical analysis to the forefront of sports betting systems. Blogs are now being written more frequently about the topic and sports handicapping services have made claims of great success using sports betting systems from advanced statistical research.

== Determining systems ==
Determining systems is a matter of using computer analysis tools and extracting all the possible games that meet a bettor's criteria. Then the bettor analyzes the results of those games to make a determination if one team is favored over the other.

== Types ==
=== Regression analysis ===
Regression analysis is a type of statistical technique used to determine the important factors that affect the outcome of the event. In the case of sports betting this is usually done with multivariate linear regression. Because sports events are very complicated and there are many factors it is extremely difficult, if not impossible, to be able to accurately identify each variable that affects the outcome of the game. Also, regression analysis assigns a "weight" to each factors that identifies how much it affects the outcome of the event. Regression analysis has become so sophisticated that some gamblers actually perform it as a full-time job. For example, Advanced Football Analytics ran a multivariate linear regression on the outcomes of American football games. The results determined that the most important aspect to winning the game was passing efficiency.

One of the problems that results from using linear regression is determining causation vs. correlation. Simply put, it is being able to identify the difference between something causing an event and something happening because of an event. Regression analysis is able to identify that events tend to occur together (or the opposite), but not if one causes the other.

Regression analysis also falls short in certain cases which are more difficult to model. For instance, in football, 3 or 7 points are typically scored at a time, so bets involving a final score frequently include combinations of these two numbers. However, a simple linear regression will not accurately model this.

=== Statistical anomalies ===
These are deviations from the common rule and give you a competitive advantage. In gridiron (American football), the most common margin of difference in the final score is 7 points (equal to one touchdown plus extra point) or 3 points (one field goal.) There can be missed extra points, safeties and conversions. But, they only come into play in a fractional percentage of game outcomes. This point statistical distribution factor opens up the possibility of statistical anomalies.

To find anomalies one needs to cautiously review players and team statistics. One should also know significant factors such as: injuries, does the team tend to win more in indoor or outdoor sports stadiums, weather (for outdoor games), what atmospheric conditions is the team used to playing in, etc. You can also look for anomalies based on public opinion and team psyche.

Factors that are used into determining betting systems are a mix of psychological, motivational, biological, situational factors that, based on past performances, support one team over another. It is generally believed that more than one factor pointing towards a team is needed to have a successful betting system.

== See also ==
- Statistical association football predictions
- Sports betting
- Virtual sports
- Arbitrage betting
