= Scatter plot =

Plot using the dispersal of scattered dots to show the relationship between variables

An example scatter diagram plotting a quality characteristic against a given input

A scatter plot, also called a scatterplot, scatter graph, scatter chart, scattergram, or scatter diagram, is a type of plot or mathematical diagram using Cartesian coordinates to display values for typically two variables for a set of data. If the points are coded (color/shape/size), one additional variable can be displayed. The data are displayed as a collection of points, each having the value of one variable determining the position on the horizontal axis and the value of the other variable determining the position on the vertical axis. The scatter diagram is one of the seven basic tools of quality control.

== History ==
According to Michael Friendly and Daniel Denis, the defining characteristic distinguishing scatter plots from line charts is the representation of specific observations of bivariate data where one variable is plotted on the horizontal axis and the other on the vertical axis. The two variables are often abstracted from a physical representation like the spread of bullets on a target or a geographic or celestial projection.

While Edmund Halley created a bivariate plot of temperature and pressure in 1686, he omitted the specific data points used to demonstrate the relationship. Friendly and Denis claim his visualization was different from an actual scatter plot. Friendly and Denis attribute the first scatter plot to John Herschel. In 1833, Herschel plotted the angle between the central star in the constellation Virgo and Gamma Virginis over time to find how the angle changes over time, not through calculation but with freehand drawing and human judgment.

Sir Francis Galton extended and popularized the scatter plot and many other statistical tools to pursue a scientific basis for eugenics. When, in 1886, Galton published a scatter plot and correlation ellipse of the height of parents and children, he extended Herschel's mere plotting of data points by binning and averaging adjacent cells to create a smoother visualization. Karl Pearson, R. A. Fischer, and other statisticians and eugenicists built on Galton's work and formalized correlations and significance testing.

== Overview ==
Waiting time between eruptions and the duration of the eruption for the Old Faithful Geyser in Yellowstone National Park, Wyoming, USA. This chart suggests there are generally two types of eruptions: short-wait-short-duration, and long-wait-long-duration.

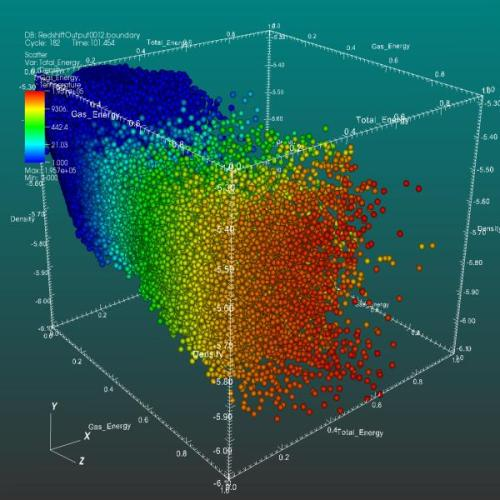
A 3D scatter plot allows the visualization of multivariate data. This scatter plot takes multiple scalar variables and uses them for different axes in phase space. The different variables are combined to form coordinates in the phase space and they are displayed using glyphs and coloured using another scalar variable.

A scatter plot can be used either when one continuous variable is under the control of the experimenter and the other depends on it or when both continuous variables are independent. If a parameter exists that is systematically incremented and/or decremented by the other, it is called the control parameter or independent variable and is customarily plotted along the horizontal axis. The measured or dependent variable is customarily plotted along the vertical axis. If no dependent variable exists, either type of variable can be plotted on either axis and a scatter plot will illustrate only the degree of correlation (not causation) between two variables.

A scatter plot can suggest various kinds of correlations between variables with a certain confidence interval. For example, weight and height would be on the y-axis, and height would be on the x-axis. Correlations may be positive (rising), negative (falling), or null (uncorrelated). If the dots' pattern slopes from lower left to upper right, it indicates a positive correlation between the variables being studied. If the pattern of dots slopes from upper left to lower right, it indicates a negative correlation. A line of best fit (alternatively called 'trendline') can be drawn to study the relationship between the variables. An equation for the correlation between the variables can be determined by established best-fit procedures. For a linear correlation, the best-fit procedure is known as linear regression and is guaranteed to generate a correct solution in a finite time. No universal best-fit procedure is guaranteed to generate a correct solution for arbitrary relationships. A scatter plot is also very useful when we wish to see how two comparable data sets agree to show nonlinear relationships between variables. The ability to do this can be enhanced by adding a smooth line such as LOESS. Furthermore, if the data are represented by a mixture model of simple relationships, these relationships will be visually evident as superimposed patterns.

The scatter diagram is one of the seven basic tools of quality control.

Scatter charts can be built in the form of bubble, marker, or/and line charts.

== Example ==
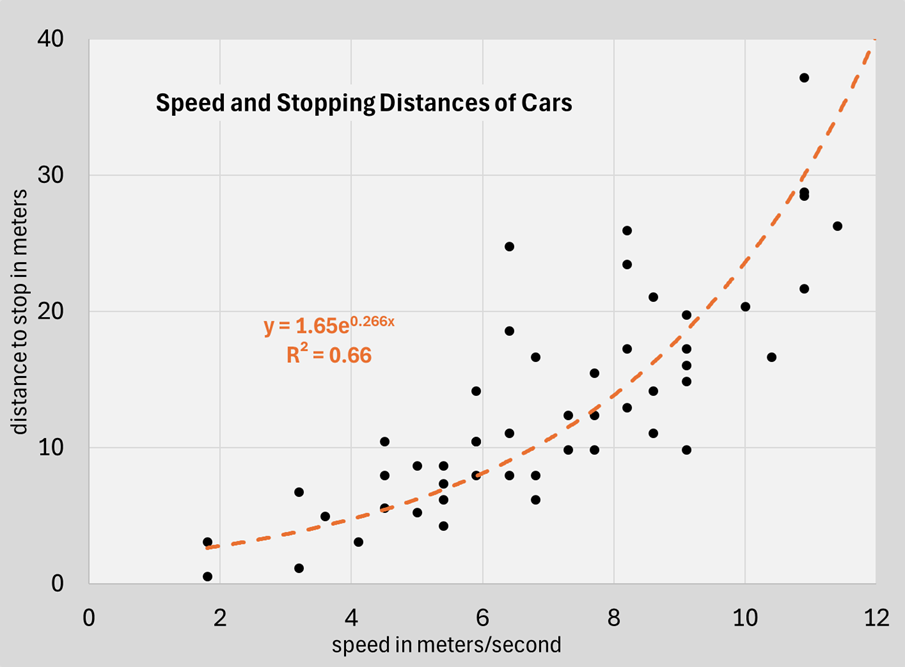
Scatter plot showing the relationship between distance to stop for cars driven at various speeds (n = 50).

For example, to display a link between a person's lung capacity, and how long that person could hold their breath, a researcher would choose a group of people to study, then measure each one's lung capacity (first variable) and how long that person could hold their breath (second variable). The researcher would then plot the data in a scatter plot, assigning "lung capacity" to the horizontal axis, and "time holding breath" to the vertical axis.

A person with a lung capacity of 400 cl who held their breath for 21.7 s would be represented by a single dot on the scatter plot at the point (400, 21.7) in the Cartesian coordinates. The scatter plot of all the people in the study would enable the researcher to obtain a visual comparison of the two variables in the data set and will help to determine what kind of relationship there might be between the two variables.

== Scatter plot matrices ==
For a set of data variables (dimensions) X_{1}, X_{2}, ... , X_{k}, the scatter plot matrix shows all the pairwise scatter plots of the variables on a single view with multiple scatter plots in a matrix format. For k variables, the scatter plot matrix will contain k rows and k columns. A plot located on the intersection of ith row and jth column is a plot of variables X_{i} versus X_{j}. This means that each row and column is one dimension, and each cell plots a scatter plot of two dimensions.

A generalized scatter plot matrix offers a range of displays of paired combinations of categorical and quantitative variables. A mosaic plot, fluctuation diagram, or faceted bar chart may be used to display two categorical variables. Other plots are used for one categorical and one quantitative variables.

Visualization of 3D data along with the correspondent scatter plot matrix

== See also ==
- Data and information visualization
- Rug plot
- Bar graph
- Line chart
- List of mathematical art software
- Scagnostics
- Dot plot (statistics)
- Parity plot
