= Kenneth W. Morgan =

American academic

- Born: October 15, 1908; Great Falls, MT
- Died: December 23, 2011 (aged 103); Winchester, NH

Academic work
- Main interests: Asian Religions
- Notable works: The Religion of the Hindus, The Path of the Buddha, Islam The Straight Path

Kenneth William Morgan (October 15, 1908 – December 23, 2011) was an American educator in the field of religion and a proponent of teaching other religions from the perspective of that religion's scholars. After completing Harvard Divinity School in 1935, he spent a year in India living in ashrams, visiting religious sites and meeting scholars. In the 1950s, while teaching Asian religions, he developed and edited books on Hinduism, Buddhism and Islam written by leading religious scholars of those faiths. He was instrumental in establishing academic centers for the study of world religions, several national professional associations, and numerous educational careers. For 25 years at Colgate University he served as chaplain, Professor of Religion, Director of Chapel House, and Director of Fund for the Study of World Religions.

== Life ==
Morgan was born on October 15, 1908, in Great Falls, Montana, into the "devout Methodist home" of Rev. Walter A. Morgan and Della Moore Morgan. The family returned to Iowa in 1910 where Walter served as pastor in several churches. Morgan graduated from Des Moines High School in 1925 and enrolled in Des Moines University. Planning to become a Methodist minister, he transferred to Ohio Wesleyan University, where he earned his BA in 1929. His interest in philosophy took him to graduate school at Harvard University, where by 1933 he had completed the necessary coursework for a Ph.D. when he transferred to Harvard Divinity School. Morgan found his spiritual development was enhanced by understanding the commonality of all religious quests for truth. He attended a variety of worship services in his personal search for religious understanding, and took advantage of opportunities to meet Asian religious scholars. An introduction to Swami Nikhilananda at the Ramakrishna Mission Center in New York City led to an invitation for residency at ashrams in India to live as swamis did, without special accommodations. In 1935, shortly after completing Divinity School with an S.T.B. degree, he was on a boat to India for a year of residence and study in Hindu ashrams. He spent several months living at Belur Math temple on the banks of the Ganges River in Calcutta and several more at Mayawati Ashram in the Himalayas. Traveling between ashrams, he visited universities and holy sites where he met Mohandas Gandhi, Rabindranath Tagore and many other scholars and educators. More doors opened for him after it became known that British Criminal Investigation Department agents brought him in for questioning because he talked with people known to advocate independence. When he returned to New York in 1936 he served as Director of the National Council on Religion in Higher Education. Two weeks later, Morgan married his Cambridge sweetheart Amy Cowing Scott. In 1937 he became Director of the Student Religious Association at the University of Michigan. When World War II began, his well-known pacifism and religious conviction enabled him to receive Conscientious Objector (CO) status. In 1942 he served as Director of a work camp for COs in northern New Hampshire and later served as Director of Education in the Civilian Public Service Program for Conscientious Objectors at the Philadelphia offices of the American Friends Service Committee. After the war he made the formal step of becoming a Quaker. Colgate University hired Morgan as chaplain in 1946, and by the following year he was also teaching philosophy. Student interest in his experience with Asian religions led to a Hinduism course in 1948, and the following year to courses in Buddhism and Islam. The lack of teaching materials about Asian religions prompted him to develop and edit three books by Asian scholars in the 1950s, one each on Hinduism, Buddhism and Islam. Also in the 1950s, he helped establish Harvard Divinity School’s Center for the Study of World Religions, and at Colgate established both Chapel House and the Fund for the Study of World Religions. He became Professor Emeritus at Colgate in 1974 and moved to Princeton, New Jersey, with his wife Amy. At 75 he learned to use a word processor and wrote Reaching for the Moon: on Asian Religious Paths about his experiences with sharing religious insights among friends of different beliefs. Amy died in 2003. Morgan died in 2011 at age 103.

== Activities ==
=== Books ===
After World War II, American college students showed increased interest in non-Western religions, but only a handful of universities in the United States or Europe offered undergraduate courses or opportunities for graduate research. The field of non-Christian religious studies had few trained scholars, and most teaching materials reflected the bias or perspective of its Western author.

Morgan proposed to the National Council on Religion in Higher Education a book about Hinduism written by Hindus. With the support of the Edward W. Hazen Foundation, he spent most of the academic year 1951–52 traveling in India seeking recommendations from religious and academic leaders about Hindu scholars who were best able to explain each major aspect of their religion to westerners. Seven authors were selected from around India. Published in 1953, The Religion of the Hindus also included Selections from Hindu Sacred Writings. Supplementary materials published as a result of Morgan's 1951 trip were a Folkways recording Religious Music of India recorded by Alain Daniélou, and a set of color slides published by Yale University showing Hindu temples and ceremonies. Morgan then edited two companion books by scholars of Buddhism and Islam. The Path of the Buddha was published in 1956. Islam – The Straight Path was published in 1958. The three books were initially published by The Ronald Press. Since the 1980s all three have been reprinted several times in India by Motilal Banarsidass and remain available worldwide.

=== Institutions ===
In early 1954, Morgan was approached by an anonymous donor who wanted to endow a university center for the study of the world's great religions. Morgan suggested Harvard Divinity School for the location, and with Godfrey Dewey mediated between the donor and Harvard University until they reached agreement. "We said that we were interested in helping to establish at Harvard a center where graduate work would be offered in great religious traditions, where people could study a religion other than their own. We said we would like to see those religions first presented as they are seen by the people who follow them." The Center for the Study of World Religions (CSWR) was inaugurated in late 1960. In 1956, Morgan returned to the donor with an idea of his own that dated back to his ashram experiences in India: a non-denominational center for personal meditation and study of religion. With facilities for short-term visitors, it would offer a chapel, library, music room, and religious art. The donor immediately supported the idea, and Chapel House opened in the hills above Colgate University in 1958.

The Fund for the Study of World Religions (FSWR) was established at Colgate University by the anonymous donor at the same time as Chapel House. As the original administrator of the Fund, Morgan used it to send many young academics to study in Asia, to bring Asian religious educators to teach in American universities and to produce educational materials.

None of these institutions bear the donor's name. "I am an old woman," the donor said, "and soon I shall be going over to the other side where I'll see all my friends. If I had done something for the Lord and added my name to it, I'd be ashamed to see them."

The American Society for the Study of Religion (ASSR) was organized in 1959 by Edmund Perry, Morgan and Joseph Kitagawa.

== Academic reception ==
Western scholars generally appreciated the "broadminded, sympathetic approach" that presented other religions through the perspective of each religion's own scholars. "Over the centuries, Hinduism has been subjected to being 'understood' by the Westerners who generally describe and judge Hindus and Hinduism by the Western standards... This is a perfect book for those who are curious about or want to study Hinduism from the Hindu point of view."

Other academics found Morgan's approach too limiting because it rejects descriptions and analyses of a religion by scholars who are not practitioners of that religion. Morgan's own religious background is blamed for his position that a scholar's own religious background distorts his perspective on other religions.

[Morgan] is convinced that only the word of scholars who are also insiders of a particular religious tradition is authoritative. In other words, the standard for valuing the accuracy of statements about any religion should be the experience and testimony of adherents. In this passionate plea for giving the word to the believers – and, consequently, refusing it to the non-believers – Morgan anticipates the celebrated (albeit highly disputed and disputable) argument raised by Wilfred Cantwell Smith (1916–2000) in an epoch-making article dated some years later: "No statement about a religion is valid unless it can be acknowledged by that religion's believers" (Smith 1959: 42 = 1976, 46). Definitely, it is no coincidence that both Morgan and Smith were adherent to a broadly ecumenical Protestant vision – the former having been brought up in a Methodist, Wesleyan milieu, the latter in a Presbyterianism converging into the United Church of Canada.

== Bibliography ==
Materials that Kenneth W. Morgan wrote, edited, photographed or arranged to be published:

- The Religion of the Hindus Edited by Kenneth W. Morgan ©1953 Ronald Press, New York (1953); LCC: 53-10466 ISBN 978-0-8260-6260-4; reprinted by Motilal Banarsidass Publishers, Delhi (1987, 1996); ISBN (Hardbound): 81-2080387-6, ISBN (Paperback): 81-2081383-9, Google Books
- Religious Music of India recorded by Alain Daniélou for the National Council for Religion in Higher Education, ©1952 Folkways Records and Service Corp.; Ethnic Folkways Library, Folkways Records FW04431 (original 1950s vinyl release: FE4431; LCC R59-629)
- Hinduism: A Collection of Colored Slides illustrating the Holy Places, Images and Practices of the Hindus photography and notes by Kenneth W. Morgan; ©1952 Visual Education Service, Divinity School, Yale University; 50 slides and taken during 1951-52 "duplicated by, and may be purchased from, Professor Paul Veith of The Divinity School, Yale University [32]." No copies of these slides are known to exist. Open Library OL18272132M
- The Basic Beliefs of Hinduism Edited by Kenneth W. Morgan ©1953 The Ronald Press Company; 1955 Indian Edition by The Y.M.C.A. Publishing House, 5 Russell Street, Calcutta 16; This abbreviated reprint of The Religion of the Hindus includes only 5 of the 6 chapters and no scriptures; paperback
- The Path of the Buddha - Buddhism Interpreted by Buddhists Edited by Kenneth W. Morgan ©1956 Ronald Press, New York (1956); LCC: 56-9981 ISBN 978-0-8260-6245-1; reprinted by Motilal Banarsidass Publishers, Delhi (1986, 1993, 1997); ISBN 8120800303 (Hardbound), Google Books
- "A similar collection of slides illustrating contemporary Buddhism is available as a supplement to this book and may be rented or purchased from Professor Veith [33]." No copies of these slides are known to exist.
- Islam The Straight Path - Islam Interpreted by Muslims Edited by Kenneth W. Morgan ©1958 Ronald Press, New York (1958); LCC: 58-9807 ISBN 978-0-8260-6230-7; reprinted by Motilal Banarsidass Publishers, Delhi (1987, 1998); ISBN 81-2080403-1 (Hardbound), LCC: 58-9807, Google Books
- Islam: A Collection of Colored Slides photography and notes by Kenneth W. Morgan; ©1959 Visual Education Service, Divinity School, Yale University; 50 slides. No copies of these slides are known to exist. Open Library OL18272166M
- Asian Religions – An Introduction to the Study of Hinduism, Buddhism, Islam, Confucianism, and Taoism by Kenneth W. Morgan, ©1964 The American Historical Association; The MacMillan Company, New York; Library of Congress 63-22733 (pamphlet 34pgs.), Google Books
- Zen Comments on the Mumonkan by Zenkei Shibayama edited by Kenneth W. Morgan; ©1974 Zenkei Shibayama; Harper & Row, NY, NY; ISBN 0-06-067279-X [uncredited by publisher but attributed by author in Introduction]
- Reaching for the Moon: on Asian Religious Paths by Kenneth W. Morgan; ©1990; Publisher: Anima, Chambersburg, PA; ISBN 0-89012-059-5 DDC: 291.095 LCC: BL624.M665 1990
