= 1994–95 Australian Baseball League season =

The 1994–95 Australian Baseball League Championship was won by the Waverley Reds, who finished the season with a 17-game winning streak. The Reds faced the 4th place Sydney Blues in the semi-final and won 2–0, while the 2nd placed Perth Heat defeated the East Coast Cougars 2–1 to win a spot in the Championship Series. The Reds won the first two games of the championship series 5-1 and 4–2, with the third game not being required.

== Ladder ==
Team	Played	Wins	Loss	Win %
Waverley Reds	58	44	14	.750
Perth Heat		45	18	
East Coast Cougars				
Sydney Blues				
Adelaide Giants		32	30	
Brisbane Bandits		26	32	
Melbourne Monarchs		27	36	
Canberra Bushrangers		18	42	
Hunter Eagles		17	47	

== Championship series ==
=== Semi-final 1: Game 1: 1st Vs 4th at Moorabin Oval ===
Team	1	2	3	4	5	6	7	8	9	R	H	E
Sydney Blues	?	?	?	?	?	?	?	?	?	?	?	?
Waverley Reds	?	?	?	?	?	?	?	?	?	?	?	?
WP: ? (1-0) LP: ? (0-1) Sv: ? Home runs: Blues: ? Reds: ?

=== Semi-final 1: Game 2: 1st Vs 4th at Moorabin Oval ===
Team	1	2	3	4	5	6	7	8	9	R	H	E
Sydney Blues	?	?	?	?	?	?	?	?	?	?	?	?
Waverley Reds	?	?	?	?	?	?	?	?	?	?	?	?
WP: ? (1-0) LP: ? (0-1) Sv: ? Home runs: Blues: ? Reds: ?

=== Semi-final 2: Game 1: 2nd Vs 3rd at Perth ===
Team	1	2	3	4	5	6	7	8	9	R	H	E
East Coast Cougars	?	?	?	?	?	?	?	?	?	?	?	?
Perth Heat	?	?	?	?	?	?	?	?	?	?	?	?
WP: ? (1-0) LP: ? (0-1) Sv: ? Home runs: Cougars: ? Heat: ?

=== Semi-final 2: Game 2: 2nd Vs 3rd at Perth ===
Team	1	2	3	4	5	6	7	8	9	R	H	E
East Coast Cougars	?	?	?	?	?	?	?	?	?	?	?	?
Perth Heat	?	?	?	?	?	?	?	?	?	?	?	?
WP: ? (1-0) LP: ? (0-1) Sv: ? Home runs: Cougars: ? Heat: ?

=== Semi-final 2: Game 3: 2nd Vs 3rd at Perth ===
Team	1	2	3	4	5	6	7	8	9	R	H	E
East Coast Cougars	?	?	?	?	?	?	?	?	?	?	?	?
Perth Heat	?	?	?	?	?	?	?	?	?	?	?	?
WP: ? (1-0) LP: ? (0-1) Sv: ? Home runs: Cougars: ? Heat: ?

=== Final Series: Game 1: Winner Semi-final 1 Vs Winner Semi-final 2 at Moorabin Oval ===
Team	1	2	3	4	5	6	7	8	9	R	H	E
Perth Heat	?	?	?	?	?	?	?	?	?	1	?	?
Waverley Reds	?	?	?	?	?	?	?	?	?	5	?	?
WP: ? (1-0) LP: ? (0-1) Sv: ? Home runs: Heat: ? Reds: ?

=== Final Series: Game 2: Winner Semi-final 1 Vs Winner Semi-final 2 at Moorabin Oval ===
Team	1	2	3	4	5	6	7	8	9	R	H	E
Perth Heat	?	?	?	?	?	?	?	?	?	2	?	?
Waverley Reds	?	?	?	?	?	?	?	?	?	4	?	?
WP: ? (1-0) LP: ? (0-1) Sv: ? Home runs: Heat: ? Reds: ?

== Awards ==
Award	Person	Team
Most Valuable Player	Scott Metcalf	Perth Heat
Championship M.V.P.	Phil Dale	Waverley Reds
Golden Glove	Geoff Blum	Hunter Eagles
Batting Champion	David Nilsson	Waverley Reds
Pitcher of the Year	Phil Dale	Waverley Reds
Rookie of the Year	Todd Le Grand	Hunter Eagles
Manager of the Year		

== Top Stats ==
Defensive Stats
Name	Wins	Losses	Saves	ERA
Phil Dale	12	2	2	2.76
Dirk Blair	12	3	0	3.93
Simon Sheldon-Collins	6	1	0	4.90
Brendan Ratcliffe	3	2	2	2.56
Warren May	4	3	0	3.21
Aaron Turnier	6	3	0	4.24

Offensive Stars
Name	Avg	HR	RBI
David Nilsson	.388	16	56
Matthew Sheldon-Collins	.319	4	27
Aaron Harvey	.314	0	4
David Clarkson	.302	10	45
Brendan Edwards	.293	0	4
Adam Burton	.272	12	37

== All-Star Team ==
Position	Name	Team
Catcher	David Nilsson	Waverley Reds
1st Base	Ron Johnson	East Coast Cougars
2nd Base	Scott Tunkin	Sydney Blues
3rd Base	Scott Metcalf	Perth Heat
Short Stop	Steve Hinton	Brisbane Bandits
Out Field	Kimera Bartee	Perth Heat
Out Field	Lonell Roberts	Sydney Blues
Out Field	Ron Carothers	Melbourne Monarchs
Designated Hitter	Stuart Thompson	East Coast Cougars
Starting Pitcher	Phil Dale	Waverley Reds
Relief Pitcher	Bob Nilsson	East Coast Cougars
Manager	Paul Runge	Waverley Reds
