= Scagnostics =

Scatterplot diagnostics measures

Scatterplot matrix of the scagnostics measures for the 91 scatterplots of the variables of the Boston Housing data set

Scagnostics (scatterplot diagnostics) is a series of measures that characterize certain properties of a point cloud in a scatter plot. The term and idea was coined by John Tukey and Paul Tukey, though they didn't publish it; later it was elaborated by Wilkinson, Anand, and Grossman. The following nine dimensions are considered:

1. For the outliers in the data:
  1. outlying
2. For the density of data points:
  1. skewed
  2. clumpy
  3. sparse
  4. striated
3. For the shape of the point cloud:
  1. convex
  2. skinny
  3. stringy
4. For trends in the data:
  1. monotony
