= Prediction =

Statement about a future event

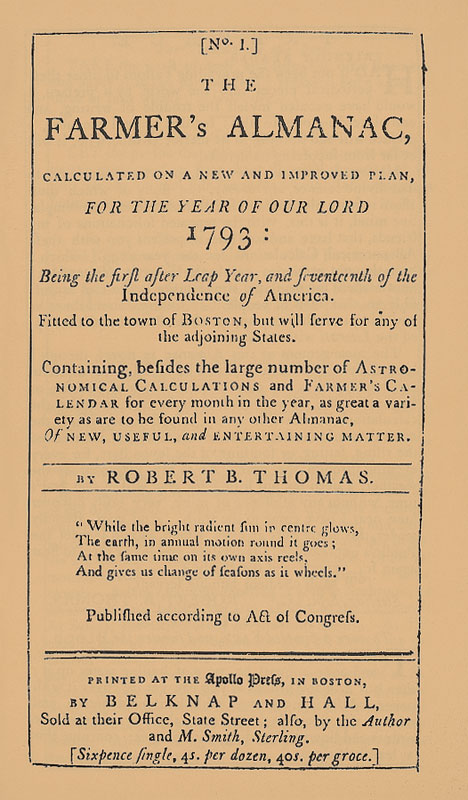
The Old Farmer's Almanac is famous in the U.S. for its not necessarily accurate long-range weather predictions.

A prediction (from Latin prae- 'before' and dictum 'something said') or forecast is a statement about a future event or about future data. Predictions are often, but not always, based upon experience or knowledge of forecasters. There is no universal agreement about the exact difference between "prediction" and "estimation"; different authors and disciplines ascribe different connotations.

Future events are necessarily uncertain, so guaranteed accurate information about the future is impossible. Prediction can be useful to assist in making plans about possible developments.

== Opinion ==
In a non-statistical sense, the term "prediction" is often used to refer to an informed guess or opinion.

A prediction of this kind might be informed by a predicting person's abductive reasoning, inductive reasoning, deductive reasoning, and experience; and may be useful—if the predicting person is a knowledgeable person in the field.

The Delphi method is a technique for eliciting such expert-judgement-based predictions in a controlled way. This type of prediction might be perceived as consistent with statistical techniques in the sense that, at minimum, the "data" being used is the predicting expert's cognitive experiences forming an intuitive "probability curve."

== Statistics ==
In statistics, prediction is a part of statistical inference. One particular approach to such inference is known as predictive inference, but the prediction can be undertaken within any of the several approaches to statistical inference. Indeed, one possible description of statistics is that it provides a means of transferring knowledge about a sample of a population to the whole population, and to other related populations, which is not necessarily the same as prediction over time. Forecasting usually requires time series methods, while prediction is often performed on cross-sectional data.

Statistical techniques used for prediction include regression and its various sub-categories such as linear regression, generalized linear models (logistic regression, Poisson regression, Probit regression), etc. In case of forecasting, autoregressive moving average models and vector autoregression models can be utilized. When these and/or related, generalized set of regression or machine learning methods are deployed in commercial usage, the field is known as predictive analytics.

In many applications, such as time series analysis, it is possible to estimate the models that generate the observations. If models can be expressed as transfer functions or in terms of state-space parameters then smoothed, filtered and predicted data estimates can be calculated. If the underlying generating models are linear then a minimum-variance Kalman filter and a minimum-variance smoother may be used to recover data of interest from noisy measurements. These techniques rely on one-step-ahead predictors (which minimise the variance of the prediction error). When the generating models are nonlinear then stepwise linearizations may be applied within Extended Kalman Filter and smoother recursions. However, in nonlinear cases, optimum minimum-variance performance guarantees no longer apply.

To use regression analysis for prediction, data are collected on the variable that is to be predicted, called the dependent variable or response variable, and on one or more variables whose values are hypothesized to influence it, called independent variables or explanatory variables. A functional form, often linear, is hypothesized for the postulated causal relationship, and the parameters of the function are estimated from the data—that is, are chosen so as to optimize is some way the fit of the function, thus parameterized, to the data. That is the estimation step. For the prediction step, explanatory variable values that are deemed relevant to future (or current but not yet observed) values of the dependent variable are input to the parameterized function to generate predictions for the dependent variable.

=== Machine learning and artificial intelligence ===
In recent decades, prediction has become a central task in machine learning and artificial intelligence research. Supervised learning algorithms, such as support vector machines, decision trees, and neural networks, are trained on historical datasets to predict outcomes on new, unseen data. These models are widely applied in domains such as natural language processing, computer vision, health informatics, and financial technology. Recent studies have emphasized the importance of model interpretability and fairness, since predictions can influence critical decisions in healthcare, criminal justice, and public policy.

An unbiased performance estimate of a model can be obtained on hold-out test sets. The predictions can visually be compared to the ground truth in a parity plot.

== Science ==
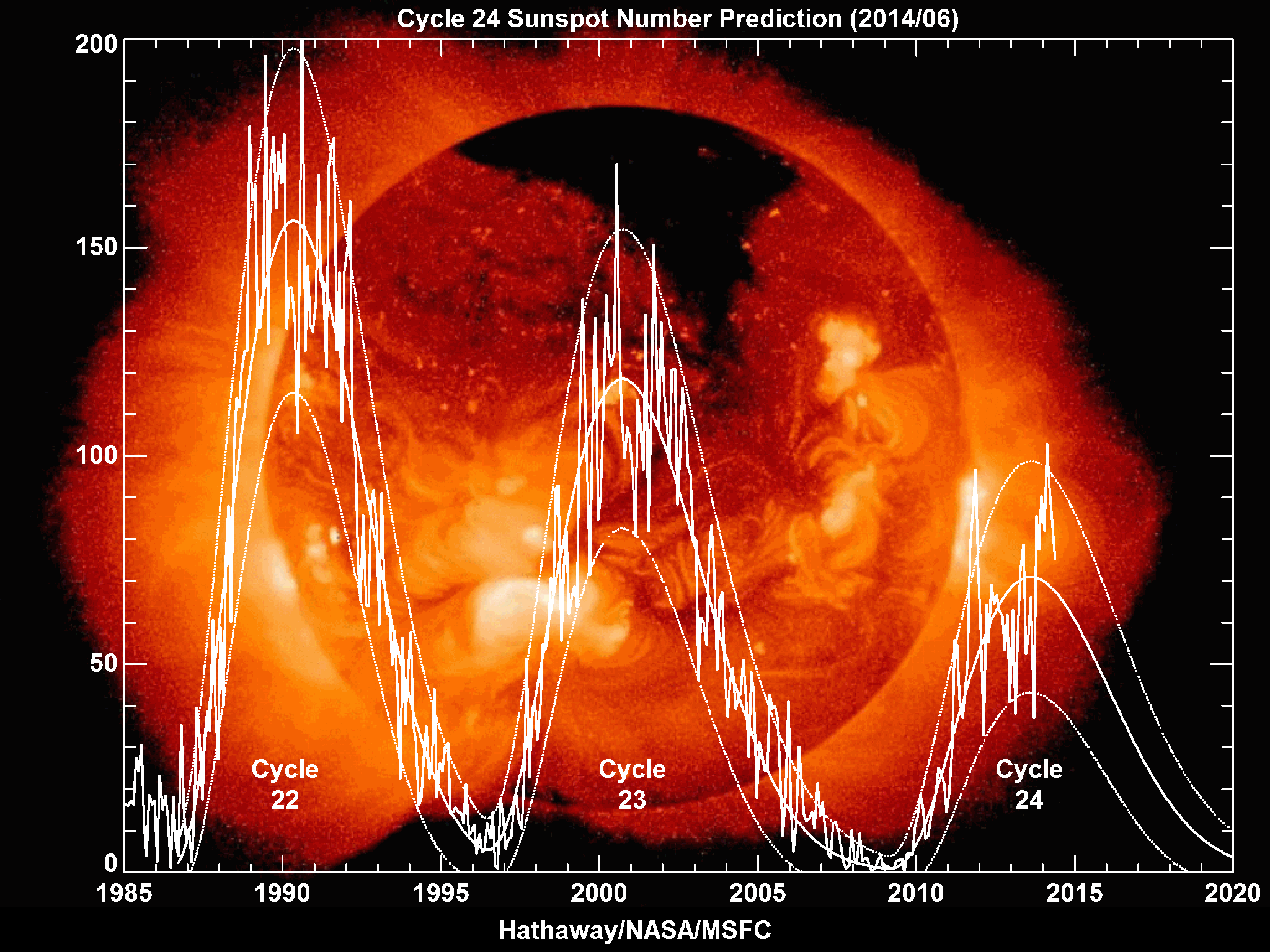
NASA's 2004 predictions of the solar cycle, which were inaccurate (predicting that solar cycle 24 would start in 2007 and be larger than cycle 23), and the refined predictions in 2012, showing it started in 2010 and is very small

In science, a prediction is a rigorous, often quantitative, statement, forecasting what would be observed under specific conditions; for example, according to theories of gravity, if an apple fell from a tree it would be seen to move towards the center of the Earth with a specified and constant acceleration. The scientific method is built on testing statements that are logical consequences of scientific theories. This is done through repeatable experiments or observational studies.

A scientific theory whose predictions are contradicted by observations and evidence will be rejected. New theories that generate many new predictions can more easily be supported or falsified (see predictive power). Notions that make no testable predictions are usually considered not to be part of science (protoscience or nescience) until testable predictions can be made.

Mathematical equations and models, and computer models, are frequently used to describe the past and future behaviour of a process within the boundaries of that model. In some cases the probability of an outcome, rather than a specific outcome, can be predicted, for example in much of quantum physics.

In microprocessors, branch prediction permits avoidance of pipeline emptying at branch instructions.

In engineering, possible failure modes are predicted and avoided by correcting the failure mechanism causing the failure.

Accurate prediction and forecasting are very difficult in some areas, such as natural disasters, pandemics, demography, population dynamics and meteorology. For example, it is possible to predict the occurrence of solar cycles, but their exact timing and magnitude is much more difficult (see picture to right).

In materials engineering it is also possible to predict the life time of a material with a mathematical model.

In medical science predictive and prognostic biomarkers can be used to predict patient outcomes in response to various treatment or the probability of a clinical event.

=== Hypothesis ===
Established science makes useful predictions which are often extremely reliable and accurate; for example, eclipses are routinely predicted.

New theories make predictions which allow them to be disproved by reality. For example, predicting the structure of crystals at the atomic level is a current research challenge. In the early 20th century the scientific consensus was that there existed an absolute frame of reference, which was given the name luminiferous ether. The existence of this absolute frame was deemed necessary for consistency with the established idea that the speed of light is constant. The famous Michelson–Morley experiment demonstrated that predictions deduced from this concept were not borne out in reality, thus disproving the theory of an absolute frame of reference. The special theory of relativity was proposed by Einstein as an explanation for the seeming inconsistency between the constancy of the speed of light and the non-existence of a special, preferred or absolute frame of reference.

Albert Einstein's theory of general relativity could not easily be tested as it did not produce any effects observable on a terrestrial scale. However, as one of the first tests of general relativity, the theory predicted that large masses such as stars would bend light, in contradiction to accepted theory; this was observed in a 1919 eclipse.

== Medicine and healthcare ==
=== Predictive medicine ===
Predictive medicine is a field of medicine that entails predicting the probability of disease and instituting preventive measures in order to either prevent the disease altogether or significantly decrease its impact upon the patient (such as by preventing mortality or limiting morbidity).

While different prediction methodologies exist, such as genomics, proteomics, and cytomics, the most fundamental way to predict future disease is based on genetics. Although proteomics and cytomics allow for the early detection of disease, much of the time those detect biological markers that exist because a disease process has already started. However, comprehensive genetic testing (such as through the use of DNA arrays or full genome sequencing) allows for the estimation of disease risk years to decades before any disease even exists, or even whether a healthy fetus is at higher risk for developing a disease in adolescence or adulthood. Individuals who are more susceptible to disease in the future can be offered lifestyle advice or medication with the aim of preventing the predicted illness.

Current genetic testing guidelines supported by the health care professionals discourage purely predictive genetic testing of minors until they are competent to understand the relevancy of genetic screening so as to allow them to participate in the decision about whether or not it is appropriate for them. Genetic screening of newborns and children in the field of predictive medicine is deemed appropriate if there is a compelling clinical reason to do so, such as the availability of prevention or treatment as a child that would prevent future disease.

=== Prognosis ===
Prognosis (Ancient Greek: πρόγνωσις 'fore-knowing, foreseeing'; pl.: prognoses) is a medical term for predicting the likelihood or expected development of a disease, including whether the signs and symptoms will improve or worsen (and how quickly) or remain stable over time; expectations of quality of life, such as the ability to carry out daily activities; the potential for complications and associated health issues; and the likelihood of survival (including life expectancy). A prognosis is made on the basis of the normal course of the diagnosed disease, the individual's physical and mental condition, the available treatments, and additional factors. A complete prognosis includes the expected duration, function, and description of the course of the disease, such as progressive decline, intermittent crisis, or sudden, unpredictable crisis.

When applied to large statistical populations, prognostic estimates can be very accurate: for example the statement "45% of patients with severe septic shock will die within 28 days" can be made with some confidence, because previous research found that this proportion of patients died. This statistical information does not apply to the prognosis for each individual patient, because patient-specific factors can substantially change the expected course of the disease: additional information is needed to determine whether a patient belongs to the 45% who will die, or to the 55% who survive.

=== Clinical prediction rules ===
A clinical prediction rule or clinical probability assessment specifies how to use medical signs, symptoms, and other findings to estimate the probability of a specific disease or clinical outcome.

Physicians have difficulty in estimated risks of diseases; frequently erring towards overestimation, perhaps due to cognitive biases such as base rate fallacy in which the risk of an adverse outcome is exaggerated.

== Finance ==
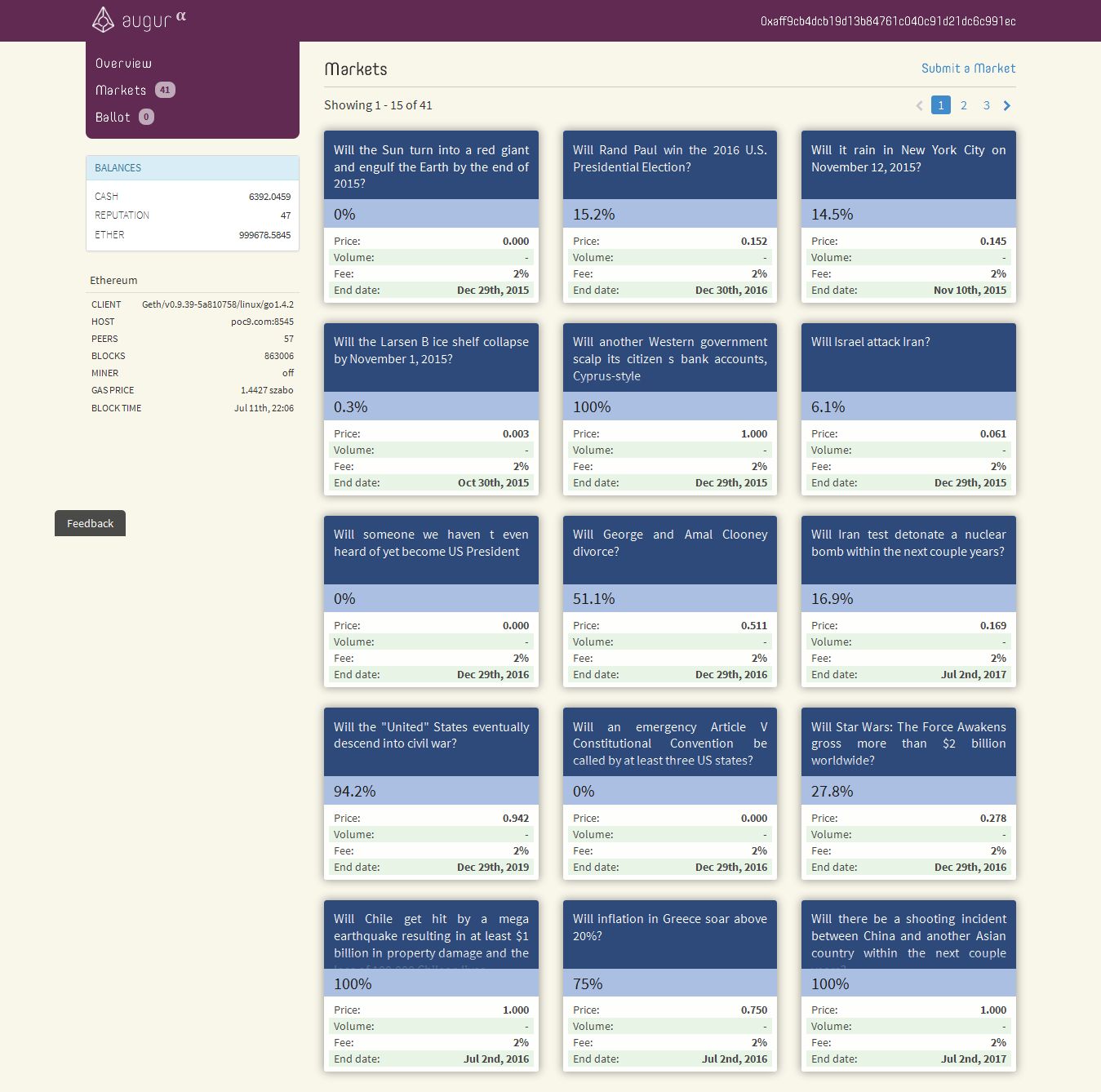
Prediction market

Mathematical models of stock market behaviour (and economic behaviour in general) are also unreliable in predicting future behaviour. Among other reasons, this is because economic events may span several years, and the world is changing over a similar time frame, thus invalidating the relevance of past observations to the present. Thus there are an extremely small number (of the order of 1) of relevant past data points from which to project the future. In addition, it is generally believed that stock market prices already take into account all the information available to predict the future, and subsequent movements must therefore be the result of unforeseen events. Consequently, it is extremely difficult for a stock investor to anticipate or predict a stock market boom, or a stock market crash. In contrast to predicting the actual stock return, forecasting of broad economic trends tends to have better accuracy. Such analysis is provided by both non-profit groups as well as by for-profit private institutions.

Some correlation has been seen between actual stock market movements and prediction data from large groups in surveys and prediction games.

An actuary uses actuarial science to assess and predict future business risk, such that the risk(s) can be mitigated. For example, in insurance an actuary would use a life table (which incorporates the historical experience of mortality rates and sometimes an estimate of future trends) to project life expectancy.

== Sports ==
Predicting the outcome of sporting events is a business which has grown in popularity in recent years. Handicappers predict the outcome of games using a variety of mathematical formulas, simulation models or qualitative analysis. Early, well known sports bettors, such as Jimmy the Greek, were believed to have access to information that gave them an edge. Information ranged from personal issues, such as gambling or drinking to undisclosed injuries; anything that may affect the performance of a player on the field.

Recent times have changed the way sports are predicted. Predictions now typically consist of two distinct approaches: Situational plays and statistical based models. Situational plays are much more difficult to measure because they usually involve the motivation of a team. Dan Gordon, noted handicapper, wrote "Without an emotional edge in a game in addition to value in a line, I won't put my money on it". These types of plays consist of: Betting on the home underdog, betting against Monday Night winners if they are a favorite next week, betting the underdog in "look ahead" games etc. As situational plays become more widely known they become less useful because they will impact the way the line is set.

The widespread use of technology has brought with it more modern sports betting systems. These systems are typically algorithms and simulation models based on regression analysis. Jeff Sagarin, a sports statistician, has brought attention to sports by having the results of his models published in USA Today. He is currently paid as a consultant by the Dallas Mavericks for his advice on lineups and the use of his Winval system, which evaluates free agents. Brian Burke, a former Navy fighter pilot turned sports statistician, has published his results of using regression analysis to predict the outcome of NFL games. Ken Pomeroy is widely accepted as a leading authority on college basketball statistics. His website includes his College Basketball Ratings, a tempo based statistics system. Some statisticians have become very famous for having successful prediction systems. Dare wrote "the effective odds for sports betting and horse racing are a direct result of human decisions and can therefore potentially exhibit consistent error". Unlike other games offered in a casino, prediction in sporting events can be both logical and consistent.

In modern times, especially in widely followed sports such as football and basketball, game and player statistics, as well as team and league data, have evolved into a true scientific discipline. By leveraging numerous parameters such as historical match results and individual player performance, it has become possible to generate highly accurate predictions. There are now well-known systems that conduct scientific studies on football predictions, supported by advanced mathematics and artificial intelligence. One such system, Soccerseer, is capable of producing predictions with a high level of accuracy.

Other more advance models include those based on Bayesian networks, which are causal probabilistic models commonly used for risk analysis and decision support. Based on this kind of mathematical modelling, Constantinou et al., have developed models for predicting the outcome of association football matches. What makes these models interesting is that, apart from taking into consideration relevant historical data, they also incorporate all these vague subjective factors, like availability of key players, team fatigue, team motivation and so on. They provide the user with the ability to include their best guesses about things that there are no hard facts available. This additional information is then combined with historical facts to provide a revised prediction for future match outcomes. The initial results based on these modelling practices are encouraging since they have demonstrated consistent profitability against published market odds.

Nowadays sport betting is a huge business; there are many websites (systems) alongside betting sites, which give tips or predictions for future games. Some of these prediction websites (tipsters) are based on human predictions, but others on computer software sometimes called prediction robots or bots. Prediction bots can use different amount of data and algorithms and because of that their accuracy may vary.

== Social science ==
Prediction in the non-economic social sciences differs from the natural sciences and includes multiple alternative methods such as trend projection, forecasting, scenario-building and Delphi surveys. The oil company Shell is particularly well known for its scenario-building activities.

One reason for the peculiarity of societal prediction is that in the social sciences, "predictors are part of the social context about which they are trying to make a prediction and may influence that context in the process". As a consequence, societal predictions can become self-destructing. For example, a forecast that a large percentage of a population will become HIV infected based on existing trends may cause more people to avoid risky behavior and thus reduce the HIV infection rate, invalidating the forecast (which might have remained correct if it had not been publicly known). Or, a prediction that cybersecurity will become a major issue may cause organizations to implement more security cybersecurity measures, thus limiting the issue.

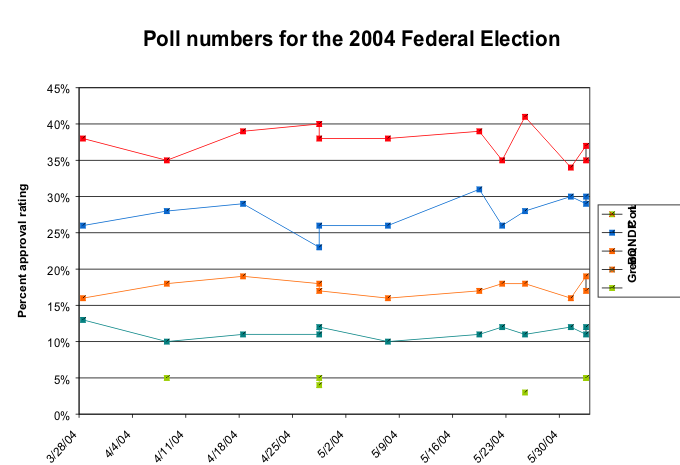
Approval ratings (percentages) for the 2004 Canadian federal election

In politics it is common to attempt to predict the outcome of elections via political forecasting techniques (or assess the popularity of politicians) through the use of opinion polls. Prediction games have been used by many corporations and governments to learn about the most likely outcome of future events.

== Prophecy ==
Predictions have often been made, from antiquity until the present, by using paranormal or supernatural means such as prophecy or by observing omens. Methods including water divining, astrology, numerology, fortune telling, interpretation of dreams, and many other forms of divination, have been used for millennia to attempt to predict the future. These means of prediction have not been proven by scientific experiments.

In literature, vision and prophecy are literary devices used to present a possible timeline of future events. They can be distinguished by vision referring to what an individual sees happen. The book of Revelation, in the New Testament, thus uses vision as a literary device in this regard. It is also prophecy or prophetic literature when it is related by an individual in a sermon or other public forum.

Divination is the attempt to gain insight into a question or situation by way of an occultic standardized process or ritual. It is an integral part of witchcraft and has been used in various forms for thousands of years. Diviners ascertain their interpretations of how a querent should proceed by reading signs, events, or omens, or through alleged contact with a supernatural agency, most often described as an angel or a god though viewed by Christians and Jews as a fallen angel or demon.

=== Artificial intelligence in astrology ===
In the 21st century, astrology has increasingly intersected with artificial intelligence (AI) and machine learning. Academic research has explored the use of AI models for astrological predictions, while media outlets have noted the rise of "astro-tech" startups and apps using chatbots and algorithmic models to deliver personalized readings.

Examples include AI-driven astrology chatbots such as KundliGPT, which use natural language processing to generate birth chart readings and answer user queries.

== Fiction ==
Fiction (especially fantasy, forecasting and science fiction) often features instances of prediction achieved by unconventional means. Science fiction of the past predicted various modern technologies.

In fantasy literature, predictions are often obtained through magic or prophecy, sometimes referring back to old traditions. For example, in J. R. R. Tolkien's The Lord of the Rings, many of the characters possess an awareness of events extending into the future, sometimes as prophecies, sometimes as more-or-less vague 'feelings'. The character Galadriel, in addition, employs a water "mirror" to show images, sometimes of possible future events.

In some of Philip K. Dick's stories, mutant humans called precogs can foresee the future (ranging from days to years). In the story called The Golden Man, an exceptional mutant can predict the future to an indefinite range (presumably up to his death), and thus becomes completely non-human, an animal that follows the predicted paths automatically. Precogs also play an essential role in another of Dick's stories, The Minority Report, which was turned into a film by Steven Spielberg in 2002.

In the Foundation series by Isaac Asimov, a mathematician finds out that historical events (up to some detail) can be theoretically modelled using equations, and then spends years trying to put the theory in practice. The new science of psychohistory founded upon his success can simulate history and extrapolate the present into the future.

In Frank Herbert's sequels to 1965's Dune, his characters are dealing with the repercussions of being able to see the possible futures and select amongst them. Herbert sees this as a trap of stagnation, and his characters follow a so-called "Golden Path" out of the trap.

In Ursula K. Le Guin's The Left Hand of Darkness, the humanoid inhabitants of planet Gethen have mastered the art of prophecy and routinely produce data on past, present or future events on request. In this story, this was a minor plot device.

== Poetry ==
For the ancients, prediction, prophesy, and poetry were often intertwined. Prophecies were given in verse, and a word for poet in Latin is "vates" or prophet. Both poets and prophets claimed to be inspired by forces outside themselves. In contemporary cultures, theological revelation and poetry are typically seen as distinct and often even as opposed to each other. Yet the two still are often understood together as symbiotic in their origins, aims, and purposes.

== See also ==
- Expectation – Anticipation that a future event or consequence is likely
- Forecasting – Making predictions with available data
- Futures studies – Study of postulating possible futures
- Omen – Future-predicting phenomenon
- Oracle – Provider of prophecies or insights
- Predictability – Degree to which a correct prediction of a system's state can be made
- Prediction market – Platforms for betting on events
- Predictive modelling – Form of modelling that uses statistics to predict outcomes
- Prognosis – Medical term for the likely development of a disease
- Prognostics – Engineering discipline
- Reference class forecasting – Method of predicting the future
- Regression analysis – Set of statistical processes for estimating the relationships among variables
- Thought experiment – Hypothetical situation
- Trend estimation – Statistical technique to aid interpretation of data
