= Kenty Creek (Mississippi) =

Stream in the U.S. state of Mississippi

Coordinates: 32°54′36″N 89°25′34″W

Kenty Creek is a stream in the U.S. state of Mississippi. It is a tributary to Lobutcha Creek.

Kenty is a name derived from the Choctaw language meaning "beaver".
