= Alexander Kent =

Alexander Kent may refer to:

- Alexander James Kent (born 1977), British cartographer and co-author of The Red Atlas
- Alexander Kent, pseudonym of Douglas Reeman while writing The Bolitho novels
- Alex Kent, former bass guitarist of Say Anything (band)
- Alexander Kent, namesake of Kentland, Indiana, United States, a town

== See also ==
- Alexandra of Kent, a member of the British royal family
