= Kent Williams =

Kent Williams may refer to:

- Kent Williams (artist) (born 1962), American graphic novel artist
- Kent Williams (actor) (born 1950), American stage and television actor
- Kent Williams (voice actor) (born 1964), American voice actor for FUNimation
- Kent Williams (politician) (born 1949), Tennessee House of Representative
- Kent M. Williams (born 1960), South Carolina politician
