= Melanie Taylor Kent =

American artist

Melanie Taylor Kent is an American artist. Born in Pittsburgh, Pennsylvania, she was raised, and has spent most of her life in Southern California. She won her first National Art Competition at age 12. She graduated from the UCLA School of Art and taught art in the Los Angeles City Schools. In 1980 she started her own publishing company and has published a series of art chronicling America by depicting famous streets and famous events.

Her artwork has been licensed to Warner Bros., Disney and Hanna-Barbera.

Kent's serigraphs are noted for the personalities that challenge collectors to identify them. She was the first artist to be licensed by the Walt Disney Company to portray Disney theme parks in limited edition prints and has been selected as the official artist of the LA Dodgers and the 30th anniversary of Dodger Stadium. She was selected as the official artist of the 50th anniversary of "The Wizard of Oz", the 15th anniversary of "Star Wars" and the 10th anniversary of "E.T.". Her depiction of the 1984 Olympics, "Let the Games Begin", was licensed by the US Olympic Committee.

Most of Kent's limited edition works are done as serigraphs, using as many as 200 separate color plates and heavy, acid free archival papers.
