= Kenty Creek (Alaska) =

Stream in Alaska, U.S.

Coordinates: 59°09′31″N 154°23′43″W

Kenty Creek is a stream in the U.S. state of Alaska.

The name Kenty Creek was collected by United States Geological Survey officials in 1923.
