= McKenty =

McKenty is a surname. Notable people with the surname include:

- Jacob Kerlin McKenty (1827–1866), American national politician
- Neil McKenty (born 1924), English-Canadian radio and television broadcaster and author
- Finn McKenty (born 1978), American marketing strategist and music commentator
