= Terry Kent (footballer) =

English sportsman

Personal information
- Full name: Terence Kent
- Date of birth: 21 October 1939 (age 87)
- Place of birth: Battersea, England
- Position: Winger

Senior career*
Years	Team	Apps	(Gls)
1958–1959	Southend United	1	(0)
1959–1960	Millwall	0	(0)
- * Club domestic league appearances and goals

Terence Kent (born 21 October 1939) is an English former sportsman who played both association football and cricket professionally.

== Football career ==
Kent made one league appearance in the 1958–59 season for Southend United. He later joined Millwall, but never played.

== Cricket career ==
Kent left Millwall in 1960, and made 10 first-class appearances for Essex between 1960 and 1962.
