= James Kent (consultant) =

Dr James Kent was appointed special adviser on health to Theresa May in January 2017. He was formerly a management consultant at Boston Consulting Group and before that he trained in medicine in Nottingham and worked as a junior doctor in the NHS.

He was appointed Chief Executive of the Buckinghamshire, Oxfordshire and Berkshire West integrated care board in July 2022, but left in September 2022 on secondment to NHS England where he will be an adviser to Chris Hopson, NHSE chief strategy officer.
