= Kent Brown =

Kent Brown may refer to:

- Kent R. Brown (1941–2020), academic and playwright from Connecticut
- S. Kent Brown (born 1940), academic in history and religion from Utah
