= Peter Kent (singer) =

German singer and producer (born 1948)

- Born: Peter Hedrich; September 6, 1948 (age 77); Herten, Germany
- Occupations: Singer; record producer
- Musical career
- Genres: Pop music
- Instrument: Vocals

Peter Hedrich (born September 6, 1948), known professionally as Peter Kent, is a German pop singer and music producer. He scored a hit when his song "It's a Real Good Feeling" reached the top of the German record chart in 1980.
