= Grace Helen Kent =

American psychologist

Grace Helen Kent (June 6, 1875 – September 19, 1973) was an American clinical psychologist. She is known for creating an influential word association test, the Kent-Rosanoff Free Association Test.

== Life ==
Kent was born in Indiana, United States and grew up in Iowa.

Kent first studied at Grinnell College for several years before moving on to the University of Iowa. She received her bachelor's degree in 1902 and her Master's in 1904. Her thesis, “Periodicity and Progressive Change in Continuous Mental Work”, was published under Carl Seashore in the Monograph Supplements of the Psychological Review. In 1905, she worked with Munsterberg at Harvard University to further her graduate work. She then went to work for three years at Kings Park Psychiatric Center on Long Island, New York. Her work with association resulted in the Kent-Rosanoff Association Test. In 1911, she received a PhD at the George Washington University. Grace Kent worked at several different hospitals and state institutions where she evaluated and studied mentally disabled patients.

Grace Kent died on September 19, 1973, at the age of 98.

== Contributions ==
She is known mainly for collaborating to create the Kent-Rosanoff Free Association Test. Grace Helen Kent was the main contributor to the Kent-Rosanoff Free Association, a word association test that was developed to differentiate schizophrenic and non-schizophrenic patients. Patients were given neutral words, chosen by Kent, that were unlikely to elicit emotional responses and asked to provide a word of their own. In scoring the test, the responses were compared to those of 1000 normal controls and distinguished in three different ways. (A) being the most common response. (B) is an individual response. (C) is an unusual response. Kent provided the psychological world with an array of new information. One of the many articles she published was called, “A graded series of geometrical puzzles. Journal of Experimental Psychology.” This was an assessment done by Kent using a series of graded geometric puzzles, which she used to measure the capabilities of children with mental disabilities. Throughout her journal, Kent mentioned several fundamental difficulties she encountered while performing this experiment. Overall, Kent found her test to be not overly effective, and highly encouraged criticism from other psychologists on what she could have done to make improvements. Another article that was written by Grace Helen Kent is titled “Experiments on habit formation in dementia praecox. Psychological Review”. Which was an assessment Kent performed to show to what extent patients with dementia could benefit from performing simple tasks. The tests that were given to the patients ranged from rearranging of digits, mazes, and marking similar figures. Kent observed that the patients made extremely hard work of their light tasks and were very habitual in their actions. Kent determined that the willingness of a patient to perform their task showed how well they might do, and that this is specific to each individual. Kent also concluded that the practice effect she observed in her patients appears to be transferable to another kind of work that uses the same motor functions.
