= Kenneth Kent (cricketer) =

English cricketer

Personal information
- Full name: Kenneth Gwynne Kent
- Born: 10 December 1901; Sparkbrook, Warwickshire, England
- Died: 29 December 1974 (aged 73); Fife, Scotland
- Batting: Right-handed
- Bowling: Right-arm fast-medium

Domestic team information
- Years: Team
- 1927–1931: Warwickshire

Career statistics
Competition	First-class
Matches	9
Runs scored	40
Batting average	4.44
100s/50s	–/–
Top score	23*
Balls bowled	1,152
Wickets	10
Bowling average	63.90
5 wickets in innings	–
10 wickets in match	–
Best bowling	3/91
Catches/stumpings	2/–
- Source: Cricinfo, 19 June 2012

Kenneth Gwynne Kent (10 December 1901 – 29 December 1974) was an English cricketer. Kent was a right-handed batsman who bowled right-arm fast-medium. He was born at Sparkbrook, Warwickshire, and was educated at King Edward's School, Birmingham.

Kent made his first-class debut for Warwickshire against Lancashire in the 1927 County Championship at Edgbaston. He made eight further first-class appearances for the county, the last of which came against Middlesex in the 1931 County Championship. In his nine matches for Warwickshire, he took 10 wickets at an average of 63.90, with best figures of 3/91. With the bat, he scored 40 runs at an average of 4.44, with a high score of 23 not out.

He died at Fife, Scotland, on 29 December 1974.
