= Kent Jones =

Kent Jones may refer to:

- H. Kent Jones (1926–1995), American politician from North Dakota
- Kent Jones (writer) (born 1964), American television and radio writer and producer
- Kent Jones (golfer) (born 1967), American professional golfer
- Kent Jones (rapper) (born 1993), American rapper
- Kent Jones (critic) (born 1957), director of New York Film Festival, film critic and director of Hitchcock/Truffaut
