= Beornoth ætheling =

English ruler

Beornoth (also written as Beorhtnoth) is only recorded in the report in the Anglo-Saxon Chronicle of the death of "Brihtsige, son of the ætheling Beornoth" in the Battle of the Holme in East Anglia in 902. He was probably descended from Mercian kings.

David Dumville suspected that he may have been the same person as Beornnoth, the Mercian dux who appears in charters between 875-888.
