= Marion Kent =

English businessperson and property manager

- Died: 1500
- Occupation: Businesswoman
- Spouse: John Kent (died 1468)

Marion Kent (died 1500) was an English businesswoman and property manager from York. She belonged to the elite of her craft and sat on the council of the mercers guild in 1474–1475, a position highly unusual for a woman in that period.

== Life ==
She was married to former mayor John Kent. Together, the couple joined the Mistery of Mercers in 1447.

When her husband died in June 1468, their children were still minors and thus she took over the management of his merchant business. The business dealt in a variety of goods, including cloth, oil, iron and timber through the Port of Hull. Kent was a supplier of iron and other materials to York Minster and sold timber to the York Guild of Corpus Christi. She also invested in at least sixteen business ventures exporting lead and cloth. Kent continued to maintain the businesses until her son Henry came of age in the late 1470s. Unusually for a woman at the time, she was a member of several guilds, including the prestigious St Christopher and St George guild, the Corpus Christi guild and held a seat on the council of the mercer's guild between 1474 and 1475.

She also owned various properties in York and its surrounding regions, including a messuage in Hertergate, which she rented at an annual rate of 1 mark in 1468–1469. In 1468, Kent received a license to have an oratory in her house.

When she wrote her will in 1488, her household included only female servants. Also in her will, she expressed a wish to be buried at All Saints' Church, Pavement, York, the same church where her husband was interred. She also left her son Henry and his children £30. Kent died twelve years later in 1500.
