= Jeff Spencer =

English footballer

Personal information
- Full name: Jeffrey Spencer
- Date of birth: 9 November 1913
- Place of birth: Shavington, England
- Date of death: 8 July 1982 (aged 68)
- Place of death: Congleton, England
- Height: 5 ft 9 1/2 in (1.77 m)
- Position: Outside right

Senior career*
Years	Team	Apps	(Gls)
- Willaston White Star
- Whitchurch
1933–1934	Nantwich		(6)
1934–1939	West Bromwich Albion	13	(2)
1939–194?	Brighton & Hove Albion	0	(0)
- * Club domestic league appearances and goals

Jeffrey Spencer (9 November 1913 – 8 July 1982), written as Geoff Spencer in some sources, was an English professional footballer who played as an outside right in the Football League for West Bromwich Albion. He appeared in all three of Brighton & Hove Albion's matches in September 1939 before the 1939–40 Football League season was abandoned because of the Second World War, and played non-league football for Willaston White Star, Whitchurch and Nantwich.

== Life and career ==
Jeffrey Spencer was born on 9 November 1913 in Shavington, Cheshire, to Arthur Spencer, a railway worker, and his wife, Martha née Wareham.

He played football for Willaston White Star and for Cheshire County League club Whitchurch, from where he had a trial with West Bromwich Albion in February 1933. Nothing came of it at that time, and he joined another Cheshire League club, Nantwich, later that season. In July 1934, amid reported interest from several Football League clubs, Spencer signed for West Bromwich Albion. By the 1937–38 season, when he underwent surgery on a cartilage problem, he had still made no appearances for Albion's first team.

He finally made his senior debut on 17 September 1938, coming into the side at outside right for the visit to Burnley in the Second Division. He set up the first goal and scored the third in a 3–0 win, and according to the Birmingham Gazette's 'Hawthorn', "made it clear he is the best outside-right Albion have." The Midland Daily Telegraph described him as "a fast, speedy winger who does not neglect opportunities to cut in" and suggested that "in the opinion of many [he] should have been given a first team chance earlier." He kept his place for ten matches, during which he scored once more, but did not appear again until late in the season.

His services were not retained, and he signed for Third Division South club Brighton & Hove Albion on 28 June 1939. Reported to be "blessed with excellent control and a fine crosser of the ball", he played in all three of Brighton's matches before the Football League was suspended for the duration of the Second World War.

Spencer returned to Cheshire, where he worked in the millwright department of the LMS Railway based at Crewe. He later served in the armed forces in Normandy, and in 1944 was reported to have returned wounded to England. He married Lettice Margaret (Lettie) Stenson, a clerical secretary, in Wistaston, Cheshire, in 1940. The couple settled in Willaston and had at least two children. In 1956, Spencer was working for the local water board in Crewe. He also served on the Committee of Willaston White Star FC and served as club chairman. Lettie Spencer became a long-serving member of Willaston parish council. She was instrumental in a lengthy campaign to secure playing fields for the village, which were opened in 1954 and eventually named in her memory.

Spencer died on 8 July 1982 at the age of 68; his death was registered in Congleton, Cheshire.

== Sources ==
- Carder, Tim; Harris, Roger (1993). Seagulls! The Story of Brighton & Hove Albion F.C. Hove: Goldstone Books. ISBN 0-9521337-0-9.
- Carder, Tim; Harris, Roger (1997). Albion A–Z: A Who's Who of Brighton & Hove Albion F.C. Hove: Goldstone Books. ISBN 0-9521337-1-7.
- Joyce, Michael (2004). Football League Players' Records 1888 to 1939. Nottingham: SoccerData. ISBN 978-1-899468-67-6.
