= Beorhtweald, Ealdorman of Kent =

English ruler

Beorhtweald Ealdorman of Kent was an English ruler of the 9th century AD. His father was Burgred of Mercia, his mother, Æthelswith, and his brother Beorhtnoð ætheling of Kent.
