= Simon Kent =

British sculptor

Simon Kent (born in Worksop on 14 March 1970) is a British sculptor, based in Nottinghamshire and South Yorkshire.

Kent is known for his large, expressive and abstract figures in green wood. His large wooden sculptures are carved using a chainsaw with very little use of a chisel or sanding. He occasionally uses a blowtorch to char the wood and produce blackening, or sandblasting to emphasise texture and woodgrain.

In the 1980s, clay was Kent's first choice sculpture material. By the 1990s, he had developed a passion for stone carving before beginning his obsession for carving wood with a chainsaw in 2000.

Since 2004, Simon has exhibited his work across South Yorkshire and the Midlands including an exhibition at Magna in 2005, and Burghley House Sculpture Park in 2006.
