= James C. Kent =

James C. Kent (born 1941) is a Canadian judge and former Brantford City Councillor. Kent is currently the Regional Senior Judge for Ontario's Central South Region.

== Early life and career ==
Kent holds a Bachelor of Laws degree from the University of Western Ontario (1967) and a Master of Laws degree from Osgoode Hall Law School (1986). He was called to the Bar of Ontario in 1969 and was a defence counsel before his appointment as a judge.

He was elected to the Brantford City Council in 1972, winning the first seat in the city's fourth ward. He served for one term and did not run for re-election in 1974.

== Judge ==
Kent was appointed as a county and district court judge in 1980. He was later named as the district court judge for Brant in 1987 and was appointed to the Ontario Court of Justice - General Division in 1990. He became the acting regional senior judge for Ontario's Central South Region in 2002 and was officially confirmed in the role in May 2003.

Kent imposed a record fine of $646,000 on a Hamilton man convicted of smuggling cigarettes in 1997.

In 1999, Kent ruled that the Government of Canada would be required to answer discovery questions from the Six Nations pertaining to the government's historical management of indigenous land around the Grand River. The government initially indicated that it wanted to appeal the decision, but it later provided the requested answers. The court decision was seen as a significant development for indigenous rights in Ontario.

Kent presided over a case involving striking workers at Engineered Coated Products in Brantford in 2010.
