= Wheeler Antabanez =

American writer (born 1977)

- Wheeler Antabanez on the Passaic River
- Born: January 31, 1977 (age 49)
- Occupation: Novelist
- Writing career
- Genres: Literary Fiction, Journalistic Non-Fiction
- Notable works: gasstation thoughts, Nightshade on the Passaic
- Website: www.luckycigarette.com

Wheeler Antabanez is the alter-ego and pen name for Montclair, New Jersey–based writer Matt Kent (born January 31, 1977). Antabanez is best known as the author of best selling special issue of Weird NJ, Nightshade on the Passaic and gasstationthoughts and The Daily Journal of Wheeler Antabanez, published by Barricade Books.

== gasstationthoughts and arrest ==
Growing up in West Caldwell, New Jersey, Kent discovered the abandoned Essex Mountain Sanatorium near his parents’ house at a young age. He became obsessed with the decaying and damaged buildings and created a website in honor of the sanatorium. The site, ‘welcometohell.net’, later became the online home of Kent's developing alter ego, Wheeler Antabanez.

On April 19, 2000, Kent was arrested in the lead-up to the first anniversary of the Columbine High School massacre for his alter ego's writings about the school shooting on welcometohell.

The charges were eventually dropped, and Kent took welcometohell offline, transforming Antabanez's daily journal into a book. “gasstationthoughts and the daily journal of wheeler antabanez” was published by Barricade Books, the controversial publisher of The Anarchist Cookbook and The Turner Diaries.

== Nightshade on the Passaic ==
For two years, Antabanez traveled up and down the Passaic River, occasionally with his daughter, Star, as first mate, exploring abandoned buildings on its shores as well as the river itself. The Passaic is one of the most polluted waterways in the US and is home to the world's largest collection of the deadly chemicals, dioxins.

Seeking out the worst possible places, Antabanez chronicles his exploration of abandoned buildings in Paterson, New Jersey, such as the old Colt Mill, which made approximately 5,000 firearms between 1836 and 1841. In addition to the river and the decaying structures that surround it, he also researched murders that involved the Passaic River, including the horrific case of Jonathan Zarate who attempted to dump the mutilated body of his 16-year-old neighbor in the river, but was thwarted by a police officer who happened to pass by at the time.

The 78-page magazine also follows Antabanez as he explores homeless haunts along the river's shore as well as the infamous “Buttonwoods” neighborhood in Lincoln Park, New Jersey.

Nightshade on the Passaic was released as a special issue of Weird NJ magazine in July 2008.

The Passaic River continues to be a sourcel of unusual stories, including the 2009 discovery of a child's body that had been taken from a grave in Connecticut as part of a suspected Palo Mayombe ritual. Because of his familiarity with its macabre history, Wheeler serves as an expert to journalists interested in the river.

In September 2010, Wheeler co-hosted a live broadcast from the last working boat yard on the Passaic for Billy Jam's Put the Needle on the Record show on WFMU. Guests included WMFU's X.Ray Burns and Mark and Mark from Weird NJ.

Wheeler's adventures on the Passaic River caught the eye of NPR in late 2010. National Public Radio sent a two-person crew to NJ to travel the Passaic River and its shoreline with Wheeler as their guide. The resulting stories and interviews turned into a feature on All Things Considered with a radio segment, written article and video.

== Passaic River floods ==
The Passaic River overran its banks in the spring of 2010 and again in 2011. For both floods, Wheeler was on-site to capture the destruction. In March 2010 Wheeler visited the flood zone near Willowbrook Mall and talked with those affected. Almost exactly a year later, the neighborhoods surrounding the river flooded again. Wheeler traveled the streets by canoe and followed the flood for seven days to create a short documentary, Following the Flood. Wheeler states in the video that he is currently filming a movie, Wheeler on the Passaic.

== Further works ==
In addition to his published works, Wheeler has an unpublished novel, Matt & Jess Forever. The story follows a young couple through drugs, murder and an intense love and is available online in its entirety.

In March 2009, Wheeler returned to his roots writing online and began a photo-based novella, Lucky Cigarette. With a new photo and entry each day, the website is a combination of Wheeler's skills as a photographer/videographer as well as novelist.

In early 2010, Wheeler uncovered writings from his youth and added them to Lucky Cigarette. Even in his childhood writings, it is clear to see the start of Wheeler's style and his flair for storytelling.

== Bibliography ==
- gasstationthoughts (2001)
- Nightshade on the Passaic (2008)
- The Old Asylum and other stories (2016)
- Matt and Jess Forever: A Satanic Love Story (2018)
- Thirteen from the Swamp: Passaic River Lore (2019)
- Walking the Newark Branch: A Photographic Journey on the Abandoned Rails of New Jersey (2021)
- Walking the Old Boonton Line: A Photographic Journey on the Abandoned Rails of New Jersey (2022)
- Full list of Wheeler's articles and books
