= Michael Kent (computer specialist) =

Computer gambler

Michael Kent was one of two founders of the Computer Group which used a statistics based sports betting to predict the outcome of college football. The group reportedly made millions each season. According to figures compiled at the time by Michael Kent, the Computer Group in 1983-84 earned almost $5 million from wagers on college and, occasionally, NFL games. Yet Michael Kent suspects that his records are incomplete. They do not account for personal bets made by Dr. Mindlin, or Billy Walters and Glen Walker or by the dozens of other associates who had access to the Computer Group's information. By the time everyone had exhausted Kent's forecasts in the 1983-84 sports year, the group was estimated to have earned $10 to $15 million.

Kent invented the statistical models. He was 34 when he had created the first successful program for handicapping basketball and football games: together with his brother, Michael collected statistical data about every team to put all that info to his computer and update the program.

The story was first reported by a national publication in the March 1986 Sports Illustrated.
