= Charles Kent (Norwegian writer) =

Norwegian writer, editor and literary critic

Charles Kent (4 September 1880, Kristiania – 27 February 1938, Oslo) was a Norwegian writer, editor and literary critic.

== Education, background and work ==
He graduated from high school in 1899 and studied then at the university. From 1910 to 1914 he was the editor in the newspaper Helgeland in Mo i Rana, from 1914 to 1919 he worked as a secretary in the newspaper Norsk Næringsliv in Bergen, from 1919 to 1923 he was secretary in Foreningen Norden and from 1926 he was editor in the Swedish magazine Ord och Bild and from 1934 to 1937 he was chairman in the Norwegian PEN-club. He had several positions in the Norwegian Authors' Union and received several scholarships.

In his youth he had been a close friend of Anders Krogvig and was very influenced by him. When Kent at the end of his life worked with a collection of his poems and the selection process was hard, his last defense for a poem he would like to put in the collection was always "Anders liked it..."

=== Ideological position ===
Charles Kent was a leading man in the new-humanist tendency in Norwegian intellectual life in the 1920s and 30s. He was a proponent of "spiritual values" and defended them against what he saw as "mysticism devoid of spirit". In his moral philosophy he was a Kantian and put forth the categorical imperative as a moral guideline.

He is supposedly the first Norwegian critic who used a psychoanalytical method when criticising a literary work.

=== Ideological conflicts in the Norwegian Authors' Union ===
Kent was in the 20s deputy chairman in the Norwegian Authors' Union under chairman Ronald Fangen. Kent was among those who reacted when Sigurd Hoel and Helge Krog in 1930 received scholarships from the union. Kent and others were of the opinion that Krog and Hoel could not receive any money since the statutes of the union said that the receivers should not "belong to movements that are in conflict with morality or the on Christianity founded order of society". Kent, who Helge Krogh referred to as Ronald Fangen's "astral body", was an outspoken participator in this ideological conflict that ended with Hoel, Krog, Arnulf Øverland, Francis Bull and A. H. Winsnes leaving the union.

== Death ==
Kent died in 1938 after a period of sickness. His death was announced on the cover of Aftenposten.

== Works ==
- Juninætter (Night in June) (1916)
- Dagdrømmen (Daydream) (1919)
- Min ungdoms by og andre vers (The city of my youth and other verses) (1920)
- Palmeøerne (Palmislands) (1924)
- Under norsk flag (Under Norwegian flag) (1925)
- Amerika rundt (Around America) (1926)
- Den gode strid (The good fight) (1928)
- Vestindiefart (Travelling to the West-Indies) (1929)
- En lægmand orienterer sig i tilværelsen (A layman orients himself in his being) (1931)
- Det står skrevet (It is written) (1937)

=== Translation ===
- Gunnlaug Ormstunges saga og andre sagaer om islandske skalder (1928)
