= Kento Yachi =

Japanese baseball player

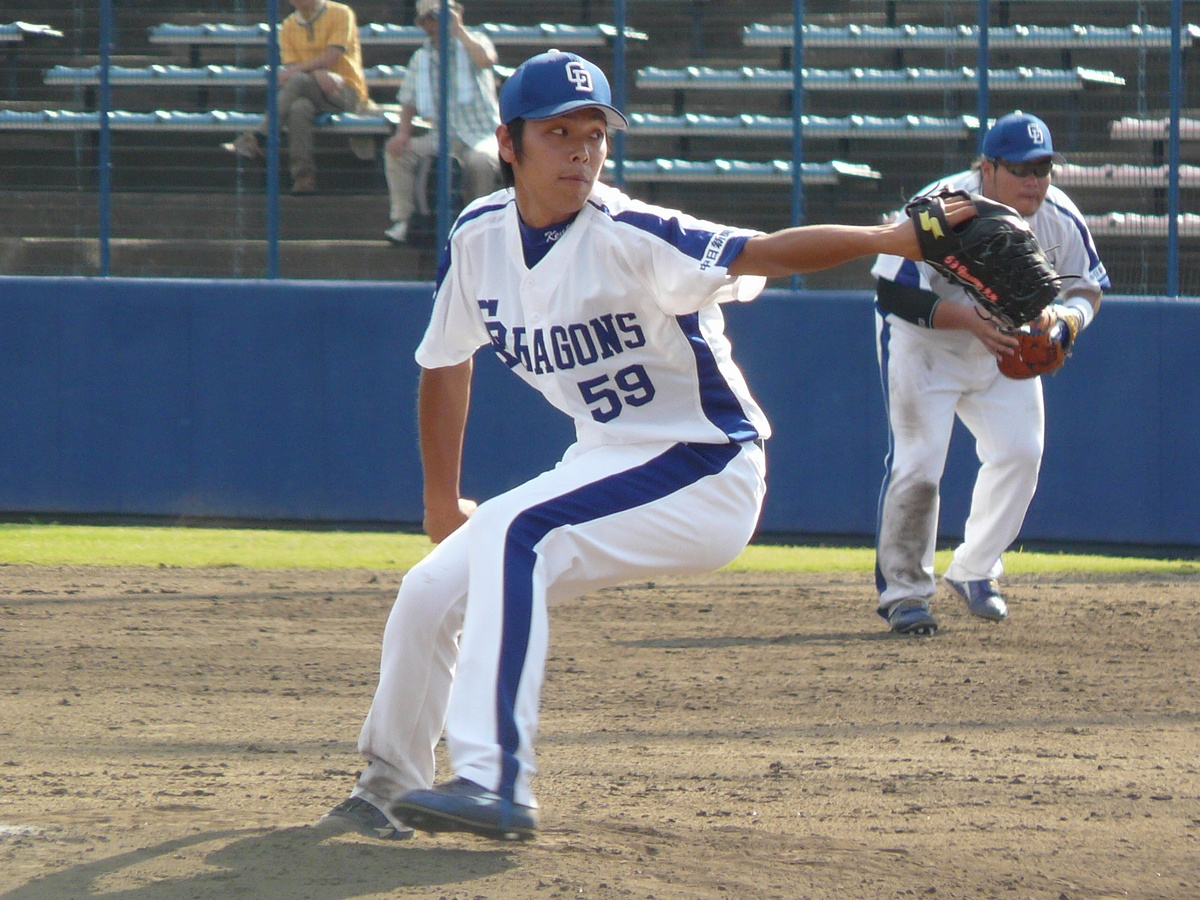
- Yachi with the Chunichi Dragons
- Pitcher
- Born: January 15, 1988 (age 38)
- Bats: Right Throws: Right

NPB debut
- 2010, for the Chunichi Dragons

NPB statistics (through 2015)
- ERA: 3.93
- Strikeouts: 27
- Stats at Baseball Reference

Teams
- Chunichi Dragons (2010–2013); Chiba Lotte Marines (2015)

Kento Yachi (矢地 健人, born January 15, 1988) is a Japanese former professional baseball pitcher in the Nippon Professional Baseball. He played for the Chunichi Dragons from 2010 to 2013 and with the Chiba Lotte Marines in 2015.
