= Charles Foster Kent =

American Old Testament scholar

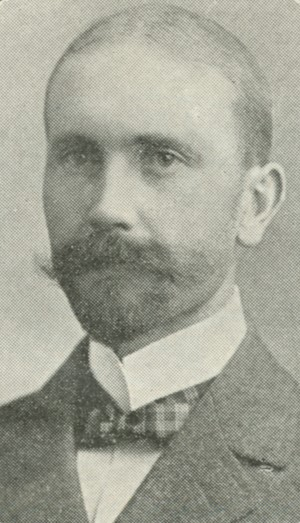
Charles Foster Kent

Charles Foster Kent (August 13, 1867 - May 2, 1925) was an American Old Testament scholar.

== Biography ==
Kent was born at Palmyra, New York, and educated at Yale (A.B., 1889; Ph.D., 1891). He studied at the University of Berlin (1891–92).

He was an instructor at the University of Chicago 1893-95 and then professor of Biblical literature at Brown. After 1901, he was Woolsey Professor of Biblical Literature at Yale. In 1920, Kent toured the University of Michigan and advocated for a nonsectarian Michigan School of Religion.

Kent was the founding president of the American Academy of Religion from 1910 to 1925.

== Writings ==
- Outlines of Hebrew History (1895)
- The Wise Men of Ancient Israel and Their Proverbs (1895)
- A History of the Hebrew People (two volumes, 1896–97; second edition, 1912)
- A History of the Jewish People during the Babylonian, Persian, and Greek Periods (1899)
- The Messages of Israel's Lawgivers (1902, 1911)
- Narratives of the Beginnings of Hebrew History: From the Creation to the Establishment of the Hebrew Kingdom (1904)
- Israel's historical and Biographical Narratives (1905)
- Origin and Permanent Value of the Old Testament (1906, 1912)
- Israel's Laws and Traditional Precedents (1907)
- The Heroes and Crises of Early Hebrew History (1908, 1912)
- The Founders and Rulers of United Israel: From the Death of Moses to the Division of the Hebrew Kingdom (1908)
- The Kings and Prophets of Israel and Judah (1909, 1912)
- The Makers and Teachers of Judaism (1911)
- Biblical Geography and History (1911)
- Life and Teachings of Jesus According to the Earliest Records (1913)
- The Songs, Hymns, and Prayers of the Old Testament (1914)
- Testing of a Nation's Ideals, with J. W. Jenks (1915)
- The Social Teachings of the Prophets and Jesus (1917)

== National Council on Religion in Higher Education ==
In 1922, he helped found the National Council of Schools of Religion, an organization that would two years later become the National Council on Religion in Higher Education, which through conference sponsorship and its Kent Fellows scholarship program played a significant role in church-university activities. In the early 1960s it merged with the Danforth fellows program and became the Society for Religion in Higher Education. In 1975 it was renamed the Society for Values in Higher Education.
