= Matthew Kent =

Australian baseball player (born 1980)

Mat Kent
- Catcher / First baseman
- Born: 2 July 1980 (age 45); Melbourne, Australia
- Bats: Left Throws: Right
- Stats at Baseball Reference

Mathew James Kent (born 2 July 1980) is an Australian former professional baseball catcher and first baseman.

== Career ==
Kent signed with the Seattle Mariners in 1997 at the age of 16 as a catcher and from 1998 to 1999 he played for the AZL Mariners in the Arizona League. In 2000, Kent was promoted to Low-A with the Everett AquaSox. After only producing a poor season with the bat, Kent was released from the Mariners organization for the 2001 season.

In 2006, the Boston Red Sox organization signed Kent after a six-year absence in the United States, and he played in High-A for the Wilmington Blue Rocks as well as playing a few games for the Triple-A Pawtucket Red Sox. However, Kent failed to product with the bat, batting a dismal .133 for the season. He was ultimately released by Boston at the end of the season.

Kent made his Claxton Shield debut with the Victoria Aces in the 2005 Claxton Shield. He also played for the Australian national baseball team in the 2006 World Baseball Classic as well as the 2007 Baseball World Cup where he was instrumental in Australia's 30–4 demolition of Thailand, hitting 5 from 6 with two doubles. He also provided a game changing RBI in the 2008 Olympic Qualification win against Canada.

After being released from Boston, he went to play in the American Association of Independent Professional Baseball with the El Paso Diablos.
