= James Kent (composer) =

English organist and composer (1700–1776)

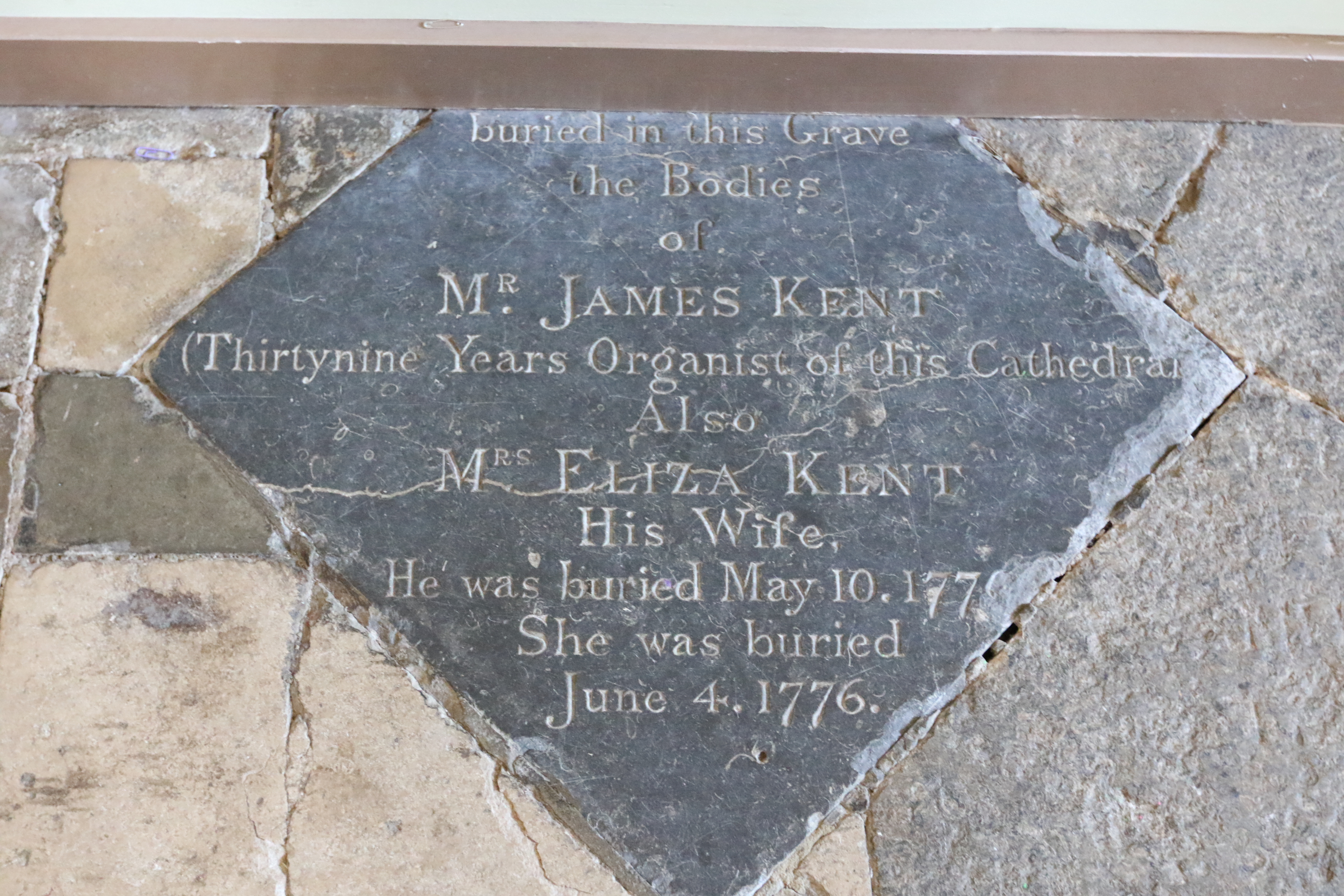
- Memorial in the floor of the north transept in Winchester Cathedral
- Born: 13 March 1700; Winchester
- Died: 6 May 1776 (aged 76); Winchester
- Occupations: Organist; Composer
- Organization: Winchester Cathedral

James Kent (13 March 1700 – 6 May 1776) was an English organist and composer.

Kent was born in Winchester and was a chorister of Winchester Cathedral and the King's Chapel. He was appointed organist of Trinity College, Cambridge, where he worked until about 1737. Then he was organist in Winchester of both the cathedral and the college. He retired in 1774 and was buried after his death in 1776 in the north aisle of the cathedral. His memorial is in the floor of the north transept.

He was a pupil of William Croft and assisted William Boyce in publishing his collection of cathedral music.

== Works ==
- Anthems: "Hearken unto this, O Man". "When the Son of Man". "Give the Lord the honour due". "Thine, o Lord, is the Greatness". etc.
- ”My Song Shall Be of Mercy and Judgement” - Solo soprano and organ

== Sources ==
- James Kent biography
- Winchester Choristers
- 'Memoir of James Kent' in The Harmonicon, Volume 8, pp. 313–314, by William Ayrton, accessed 21 November 2010
