= Canter (surname) =

Canter is a surname. It is or has been borne in different countries by various unrelated families or families with no known connection to each other. These include English-American Canters whose earliest known possible ancestor is an 18th-century Thomas Canter of Maryland; Jewish-American Canters such as the Kentucky author Mark Canter and the Canter family that opened Canter's Deli in Los Angeles; a learned medieval and early modern Canter family of Groningen and Friesland, prominent in various branches of learning and in politics; Canters who are related to the Caunter family of Devon, etc.

In Britain, the early examples of the surname Canter are all from Latin cantor and refer to precentors in cathedrals or monasteries. The surname also occurs as a derivation from Anglo-Norman caunter/cauntour, 'singer, one who leads the singing'.

Notable people with the surname include:

- Brian Canter (1987), American professional bull rider
- Dan Canter (1961–2020), American soccer defender
- David Canter (born 1944), British psychologist
- Hilda Mabel Canter (1922–2007), English mycologist, protozoologist, and photographer
- Jake Canter (born 2003), American snowboarder
- Jessika Carter (born 1999), American basketball player
- Jean-Christophe Canter (born 1960), French politician
- Jon Canter, English sitcom and comedy writer
- Jonathan Canter (born 1965), American tennis player
- Laurence Canter (born 1953), American lawyer and Usenet spammer
- Laurie Canter (born 1989), English golfer
- Marc Canter, American IT professional and multimedia pioneer
- Mark Canter (born 1952), American journalist and writer
- Mathilda B. Canter (1924–2015), American psychologist
- Rosalind Canter (born 1986), British equestrian
- Willem Canter (1542–1575), Dutch classical scholar

== See also ==
- Caunter, surname
- Cantor, surname
- Kanter, surname
- Kantor (surname)
- Ganter, surname
- Canter Cremers, surname
- Canter Visscher, surname

== Sources ==
- Biografisch Portaal van Nederland
- Nieuw Nederlandsch Biografisch Woordenboek
