= Kantorov (surname) =

Kantorov or Kantorow is a jewish surname.

== Etymology and spelling ==
In Israel and among Sephardi and Mizrahi Jews, the surname Hassan (חסן) is derived as a spelling variant of Hazzan ("cantor") and the word Cantor in English, this prayer leader is often referred to as a cantor, a term also used in Christianity.

List of variant spellings

- In French: Kantorow
- In Russian: Канторов

== People ==
=== A ===
- Alexander Kantorov (born 1947), Russian conductor
- Alexandre Kantorow (born 1997), French pianist

=== J ===
- Jean-Jacques Kantorow (born 1945), French violinist and conductor

== See also ==
- Cantor (surname)
- Kantor (surname)
- Kanter, surname
