= Ganter (surname) =

Ganter is a surname. Notable people with the surname include:

- Allan Ganter (born 1938), Australian figure skater
- Amy Kim Ganter (born 1980), American comics artist
- Bernard J. Ganter (1928–1993), American Roman Catholic bishop
- Emil Ganter, Swiss footballer

== See also ==
- Canter (surname)
- Cantor (surname)
- Caunter, surname
- Kanter, surname
- Kantor (surname)
