= Kantor =

Kantor may refer to:

- Kantor double in mathematics
- Kantor–Koecher–Tits construction in mathematics
- Kantor (surname)

== See also ==
- Kantorovich
- Cantor
- Cantor (disambiguation)
