= Kanter =

Kanter is a surname. Notable people with the surname include:

- Aaron Kanter, American poker player
- Albert Kanter (1897–1973), Russian publisher and creator of Classics Illustrated and Classic Comics
- Anita Kanter (born 1933), American tennis player
- Arlene S. Kanter, American legal scholar
- Arnold Kanter (1945–2010), American politician
- Bernadette Kanter (born 1950), French sculptor
- Buzz Kanter (born 1955), American editor and publisher of motorcycle magazines
- Dan Kanter (born 1981), Canadian music producer and songwriter
- Enes Kanter (born 1992), Turkish professional basketball player
- Gerd Kanter (born 1979), Estonian discus thrower
- Hal Kanter (1918–2011), American comedy writer
- Jay Kanter (1926–2024), American film producer
- Jonathan Kanter (born 1973), American antitrust lawyer
- Krista Kanter (1946–2009), Estonian radio journalist and politician
- Martha Kanter, American education official
- Max Kanter (born 1997), German cyclist
- Ron Kanter (born 1948), Canadian liberal politician
- Rosabeth Moss Kanter (born 1943), American professor of business

== See also ==
- Canter (surname)
- Cantor (surname)
- Ganter (surname)
- Konter (disambiguation)
- Julian P. Kanter Political Commercial Archive, depository for political television and radio commercials in the United States
- Kantner, surname
- Kantor (surname)
