= Peter Trapa =

American mathematician

- Born: 1974 (age 51–52)
- Scientific career
- Fields: Mathematics Lie Groups

Peter Engel Trapa is an American mathematician and inaugural Vice Provost and Senior Dean of the College and Schools of Liberal Arts and Sciences at the University of Utah. His research focus is on the representation theory of reductive Lie groups. Trapa received his Bachelor of Arts in mathematics and integrated science from Northwestern University and his Ph.D. in mathematics from the Massachusetts Institute of Technology. While at MIT, Trapa studied representation theory with David Vogan. He completed postdoctoral work at the Institute for Advanced Study in Princeton, NJ, and Harvard University.

== Career and Research ==
Trapa currently serves as the inaugural Vice Provost and Senior Dean of the College and Schools of Liberal Arts and Sciences. Previously, he served as Dean of the College of Science and College of Mines and Earth Sciences. Prior to that, he served chair of the Department of Mathematics and the chair of the Department of Physics & Astronomy.

Trapa works on unitary representations of Lie groups, and is a member of the Atlas of Lie Groups project. With Jeffrey Adams, Marc van Leuuwen, and David Vogan, he devised an algorithm to compute the unitary dual of a real reductive group. With his collaborators, he developed a Shimura correspondence for split reductive groups and introduced a Dirac operator for p-adic spaces. He was named a Fellow of the American Mathematical Society in 2019.
