= List of commanders of the British 7th Armoured Division =

Military unit officers

Mobile Division, Egypt / Mobile Division (Egypt) Armoured Division (Egypt) 7th Armoured Division
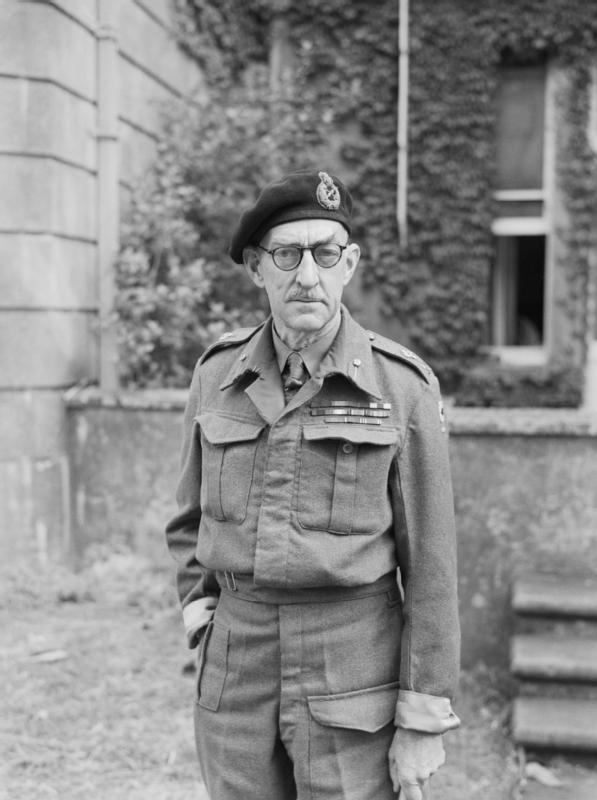
- Percy Hobart, the first commanding officer of the Mobile Division (Egypt)
- Active: 1938–1958
- Country: United Kingdom
- Branch: British Army
- Engagements: Second World War

The 7th Armoured Division was an armoured division of the British Army and formed in 1938. The division was commanded by a general officer commanding (GOC), who received orders from a level above him in the chain of command, and then used the forces within the division to undertake the mission assigned. In addition to directing the tactical battle in which the division was involved, the GOC oversaw a staff and the administrative, logistical, medical, training, and discipline concerns of the division. From its founding to when it was redesignated in the 1950s, the division had 18 permanent GOCs; one of whom was killed and another wounded.

The division was formed in Egypt, from mechanised-cavalry and tank units that were based there, following raising tensions with Italy. In 1939, the Mobile Division was renamed the Armoured Division and then became the 7th Armoured Division a year later. Following the Italian entry into the war, in June 1940, the division skirmished with their opposing forces throughout several engagements. After the Italian invasion of Egypt, a British counterstroke (Operation Compass) was launched in December 1940 and the division was able to help in the destruction of the Italian Tenth Army. Over the following two years, it fought in all the major battles of the back and forth Western Desert campaign. The fighting in the Western Desert saw the death of one commanding officer, Jock Campbell. Following the Second Battle of El Alamein it assisted in the pursuit west and joined in the Tunisian campaign and that fighting resulted in John Harding being wounded. While not selected for the subsequent Allied invasion of Sicily, it did land in mainland Italy for the opening stages of the Italian campaign. Chosen as a veteran formation to bolster the Second Army for Operation Overlord, the division was withdrawn to the UK and then landed in France in June 1944. It then fought in the Battle of Caen, notably at the Battle of Villers-Bocage and during Operation Goodwood. Following the Allied victory in Normandy, the division pushed east across France into the Low Countries, supported Operation Market Garden, and then took part in the Western Allied invasion of Germany.

The division was located in Germany at the end of the war and became part of the British Army of the Rhine. It was temporarily disbanded, when it was turned into a military district although it was soon reactivated. It remained in Germany until it was finally disbanded in 1958. The legacy of the division was maintained by the 7th Armoured Brigade until 2014, when it was reorganised as the 7th Light Mechanised Brigade Combat Team.

== General officer commanding ==
General officer commanding
No.	Appointment date	Rank	General officer commanding	Notes	Source(s)
1	27 September 1938	Major-General	Percy Hobart	The division was formed in the United Kingdom, as the Mobile Division, Egypt / Mobile Division (Egypt).	
Acting	16 November 1939	Brigadier	John Caunter		
2	4 December 1939	Major-General	Michael Creagh	The formation was redesignated as the 7th Armoured Division on 16 February 1940	
Acting	1 April 1940	Brigadier	John Caunter		
2	13 April 1940	Major-General	Sir Michael Creagh		
3	3 September 1941	Major-General	William Gott		
4	6 February 1942	Major-General	Jock Campbell	Killed in action on 23 February	
Acting	23 February 1943	Brigadier	Alexander Gatehouse		
5	9 March 1942	Major-General	Frank Messervy		
6	19 June 1942	Major-General	James Renton		
7	14 September 1942	Major-General	John Harding	Harding was wounded in action on 19 January 1943	
Acting	20 January 1943	Brigadier	Philip Roberts		
8	24 January 1943	Major-General	George Erskine		
9	4 August 1944	Major-General	Gerald Verney		
10	22 November 1944	Major-General	Lewis Lyne	While retaining command of the division, Lyne was also the Commandant of the British sector of occupied Berlin in 1945. In December 1945, Lyne relinquished command of the division.	
11	January 1946	Major-General	Philip Roberts		
12	November 1947	Major-General	Philip Balfour	The division was disbanded in March 1948	
13	April 1948	Major-General	Euan Miller	The division was reformed from "Hannover District", a military district that had been formed in Germany.	
14	10 May 1949	Major-General	Robert Arkwright		
15	1 May 1951	Major-General	Charles Jones		
16	1 December 1953	Major-General	Kenneth Cooper		
17	24 March 1956	Major-General	John Hackett		
18	3 February 1958	Major-General	Geoffrey Musson	The division was redesignated as the 5th Division in April 1958. The 7th Armoured Division's history was then transferred to the 7th Armoured Brigade.	
