= Konter =

Konter may refer to:

== People ==
- François Konter (1934–2018), Luxembourgian football player
- Lucien Konter (1925–1990), Luxembourgian footballer
- Richard W. Konter (1882–1979), radioman in the U.S. Navy

== Others ==
- Konter a Matt, Luxembourgish card game
- Konter Cliffs, line of cliffs in Marie Byrd Land, Antarctica

== See also ==
- Kanter, surname
