= Structurable algebra =

In abstract algebra, a structurable algebra is a certain kind of unital involutive non-associative algebra over a field. For example, all Jordan algebras are structurable algebras (with the trivial involution), as is any alternative algebra with involution, or any central simple algebra with involution. An involution here means a linear anti-homomorphism whose square is the identity.

Assume A is a unital non-associative algebra over a field, and $x \mapsto \bar{x}$ is an involution. If we define $V_{x,y}z:=(x\bar{y})z+(z\bar{y})x-(z\bar{x})y$, and $[x,y]=xy-yx$, then we say A is a structurable algebra if:

$[V_{x,y} , V_{z,w}] = V_{V_{x,y}z,w} - V_{z,V_{y,x}w}.$

== Uses ==
Structurable algebras were introduced by Allison in 1978. The Kantor–Koecher–Tits construction produces a Lie algebra from any Jordan algebra, and this construction can be generalized so that a Lie algebra can be produced from a structurable algebra. Moreover, Allison proved over fields of characteristic zero that a structurable algebra is central simple if and only if the corresponding Lie algebra is central simple.

Another example of a structurable algebra is a 56-dimensional non-associative algebra originally studied by Brown in 1963, which can be constructed out of an Albert algebra. When the base field is algebraically closed over characteristic not 2 or 3, the automorphism group of such an algebra has identity component equal to the simply connected exceptional algebraic group of type E_{6}.
