= John Stembridge =

American mathematician

John Stembridge is an Emeritus Professor of Mathematics at the University of Michigan. He received his Ph.D. from the Massachusetts Institute of Technology in 1985 under the direction of Richard P. Stanley. His dissertation was entitled Combinatorial Decompositions of Characters of SL(n,C). He has had 8 Ph.D. students.

He is one of the participants in the Atlas of Lie Groups and Representations.

== Research ==
His research interests are in combinatorics, with particular emphasis on the following areas:

- Topics related to algebra, especially representation theory
- Coxeter groups and root systems
- Enumerative combinatorics
- Symmetric functions
- Hypergeometric series and q-series
- Computational problems and algorithms in algebra

He was awarded a Guggenheim Fellowship in 2000 for work in Combinatorial aspects of root systems and Weyl characters..

He has written Maple packages that can be used for computing symmetric functions, posets, root systems, and finite Coxeter groups.
