= Caunter =

Caunter is a surname originating principally in the West Country in England. The name derives from Anglo-Norman caunter/cauntour, "singer, one who leads the singing", or from Latin cantor, referring to precentors in cathedrals or monasteries.

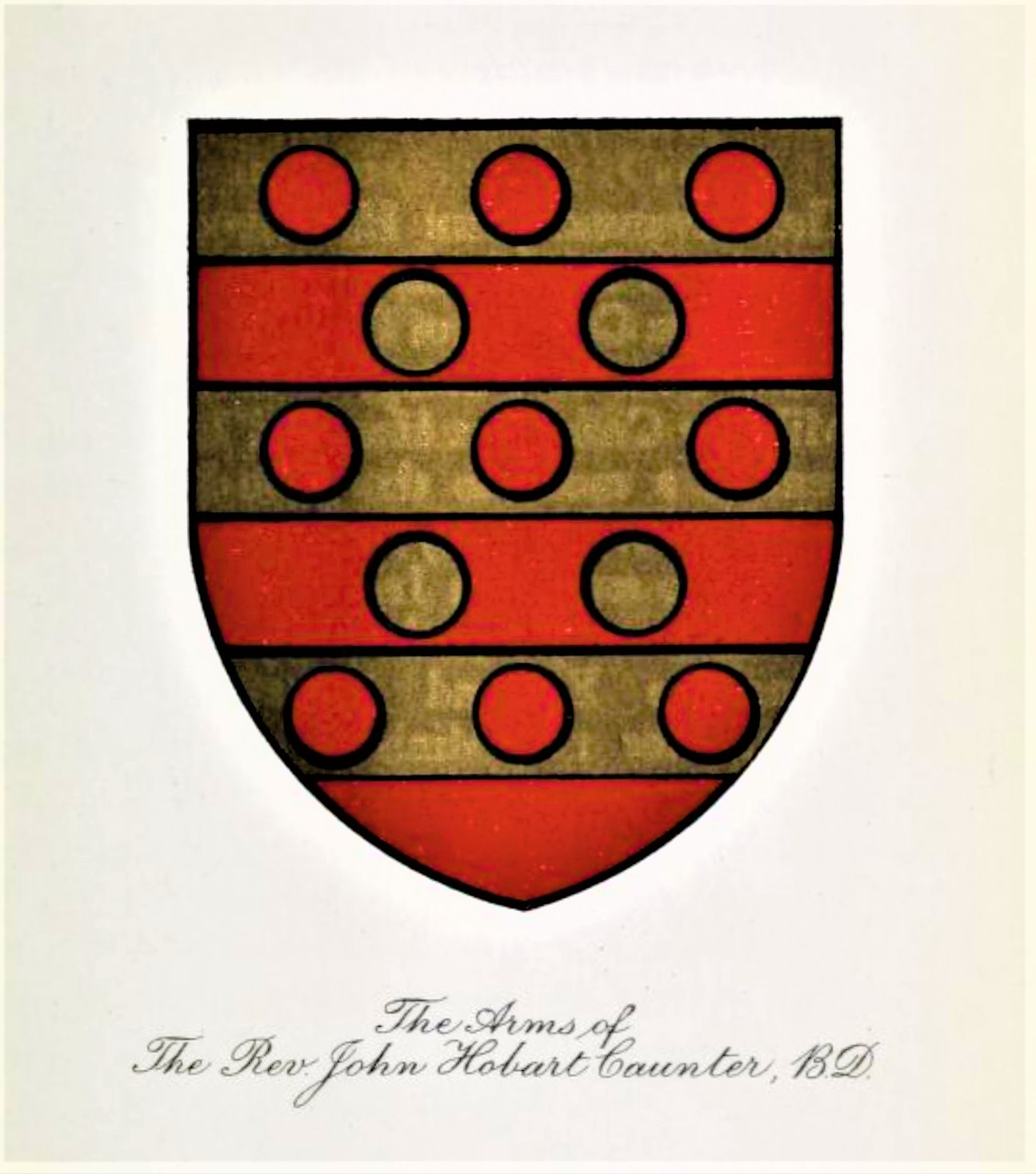
The Arms of The Rev. John Hobart Caunter, B.D.

== Places historically associated with the name ==
Bearers of the name have historically been established in the South Devon towns of Ashburton and Tavistock and villages of Widecombe in the Moor (from at least the 15th century) and Staverton. In 1991 The Devon Historian, the journal of the Devon History Society, devoted an article to the Caunters of the hamlet of Ponsworthy (near Widecombe in the Moor), Dartmoor. A Caunter family of Widecombe emigrated to Ontario, Canada in the mid-19th century, where the name soon came to be spelled Counter. Reportedly, this was either because "Counter" was the usual pronunciation of the name in Ontario or because the form Caunter, presumed to be Scottish, was anglicised to Counter.

The Caunter surname is also established in Cornwall. In addition, there have been Caunters in Penang, Malaysia since George Caunter (1758–1811) of Staverton, Devon was the island's superintendent in the final years of the eighteenth century.

== Origin legends ==
In Caunter Family History (1930), the Liskeard solicitor Frederick Lyde Caunter (1892–1964) gives a history of the Ashburton and Staverton Caunters starting in the early 16th century. He discusses the family legends – and considers them just that – that the Devonshire Caunters are descended from Condor, Earl of Cornwall and that there is a connection with John the Chanter, a 12th-century Bishop of Exeter.

F. L. Caunter also refers to family notes that state that the alleged descendants from Condor "in the direct line settled in that part of the County called 'the South Hams,' & a younger branch retired to a more remote part of the County of Cornwall. The Devonshire branch have added a letter to their name, they spell it Caunter, whilst the Cornish branch spell it Canter."

The Cornwall Online Parish Clerks database holds more pre-1900 baptism, marriage and burial records for Caunter than for Canter, and shows a concentration of both names in the southeast of Cornwall.

== Notable bearers ==
Notable people with the surname include:

- Cyril Francis Caunter (1899–1988), English aviation historian and author
- George Caunter (1758–1811), British administrator, Acting Superintendent of Penang
- George Henry Caunter (1791–1843), English judge and writer
- Henry Caunter (1808–1881), English entrepreneur and amateur scientist, musician and portrait painter
- Henry Lyde Caunter, English solicitor and mayor of Liskeard, Cornwall (elected 1862)
- John Alan Lyde Caunter (1889–1981), British Army officer and pioneer shark angler
- John Hobart Caunter (1793–1851), English clergyman and writer
- Marion Caunter (born 1980), television presenter from Penang, Malaysia
- Richard McDonald Caunter (1798–1879), English clergyman and writer
- Tony Caunter (1937–2025), English actor

== See also ==
- Canter (surname)
