= Kantor (surname) =

Kantor is a surname. Notable people with the surname include:

- Adam Kantor, American actor and singer
- Frederick Kantor (1942–2020), American physicist and inventor
- Gergely Kántor (born 1999), Hungarian chess grandmaster
- Isaiah Kantor (or Issai Kantor), mathematician
- Istvan Kantor, Canadian performance artist
- Jodi Kantor, American journalist
- Loli Kantor (born 1952), American photographer
- MacKinlay Kantor, American novelist and screenwriter
- Maxim Kantor, Russian painter and writer
- Mickey Kantor, American lawyer and politician
- Piotr Kantor, Polish volleyball player
- Roman Kantor (1912–1943), Polish épée fencer killed by the Nazis
- Seligmann Kantor (1857–1903), Bohemian mathematician
- Sharon Kantor (born 2003), Israeli windsurfer
- Tadeusz Kantor, Polish painter and theatre director
- Viatcheslav Moshe Kantor, Russian businessman, philanthropist and Jewish leader
- William Kantor (born 1944), American mathematician
- Joe Kantor (1942-2021), Football player famously known for his position of Halfback for the Washington Redskins

== See also ==
- Cantor (surname)
- Kantorov (surname)
- Kanter, surname
