= Monica Nevins =

Canadian mathematician

Monica A. Nevins (born 1973) is a Canadian mathematician, and a professor of mathematics and statistics at the University of Ottawa. Her research interests include abstract algebra, representation theory, algebraic groups, and mathematical cryptography.

== Education and career ==
Nevins went to high school in Val-d'Or, Quebec. She graduated from the University of Ottawa in 1994, and completed a PhD in mathematics at the Massachusetts Institute of Technology in 1998. Her dissertation, Admissible Nilpotent Coadjoint Orbits of p-adic Reductive Lie Groups, was supervised by David Vogan.

After postdoctoral research at the University of Alberta, Nevins joined the faculty of the University of Ottawa, where she was promoted to full professor in 2014.

== Recognition ==
Nevins was the 2010–2011 winner of the University of Ottawa Award for Excellence in Teaching. She was elected as a fellow of the Canadian Mathematical Society in 2019.

== Personal ==
Monica married Ralph Nevins, who is a computer scientist and mathematical artist.
