= Fokko du Cloux =

Fokko du Cloux (20 December 1954, Rheden – 10 November 2006) was a Dutch mathematician and computer scientist. He worked on the Atlas of Lie groups and representations until his death.

== Career in mathematics ==
Du Cloux was based at the Institut Girard Desargues, Université Claude Bernard Lyon 1, Villeurbanne, in France. One of the founding members of the project, he was responsible for building the Atlas software which was instrumental in the mapping of the structure of the E_{8} Lie group. Fokko du Cloux was diagnosed with Amyotrophic lateral sclerosis (ALS) in 2005, but he continued to actively participate in the project until his death from ALS. The Project successfully completed the task in 2007, a few months after du Cloux's death.
