= Brian Canter =

American bull rider

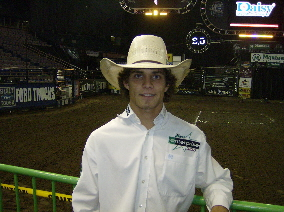
- Born: June 25, 1987 (age 39); Randleman, North Carolina, United States
- Occupation: professional bull rider
- Years active: 2004-2020

Brian Canter (born June 25, 1987) is an American former professional rodeo cowboy who specialized in bull riding. In his professional career he competed in the Professional Bull Riders (PBR) circuit.

Canter started out riding at the semi-professional level, winning the 2004 Southern Extreme Bull Riding Association (SEBRA) year-end title. His older brother Jeff was also a bull rider who won the SEBRA championship in 1995, 1996, and 2000. Once Brian turned 18 in June 2005, he bought his PBR permit. He first came on as an alternate in the 2005 PBR World Finals. He won money that year to qualify for the 2006 Built Ford Tough Series (BFTS). His first full season on tour was 2006. He notched his first career win by winning the 2006 BFTS event in Billings, Montana, and that helped him qualify for the PBR World Finals in Las Vegas, Nevada. He qualified for the PBR World Finals four consecutive times from 2006 through 2009. He finished in the top 50 in 2005, 8th in 2006, 11th in 2007, and 25th in 2008. Among his other event championships was winning the inaugural PBR Canada Finals in Calgary, Alberta, in 2006.

Canter was a left-handed rider who learned to ride from Jerome Davis, one of the founders of the PBR, on Davis' ranch in Archdale, North Carolina.

Canter was one of the smaller riders on tour at 5'3" and 115 pounds. His hobbies include hunting, fishing, wakeboarding, and snowboarding. He was a part of the elite Team Enterprise, a team that included active and former PBR bull riders, as well as entertainer Flint Rasmussen, which lasted from 2006 to 2010. He often traveled with his good friends and fellow PBR riders, J. B. Mauney and Shane Proctor. Canter’s final professional out was at the PBR Velocity Tour event in Hampton, Virginia, in late February 2020 and has since retired from bull riding. He makes his home in Randleman, North Carolina.
