= If You Knew Susie =

1925 song performed by Eddie Cantor

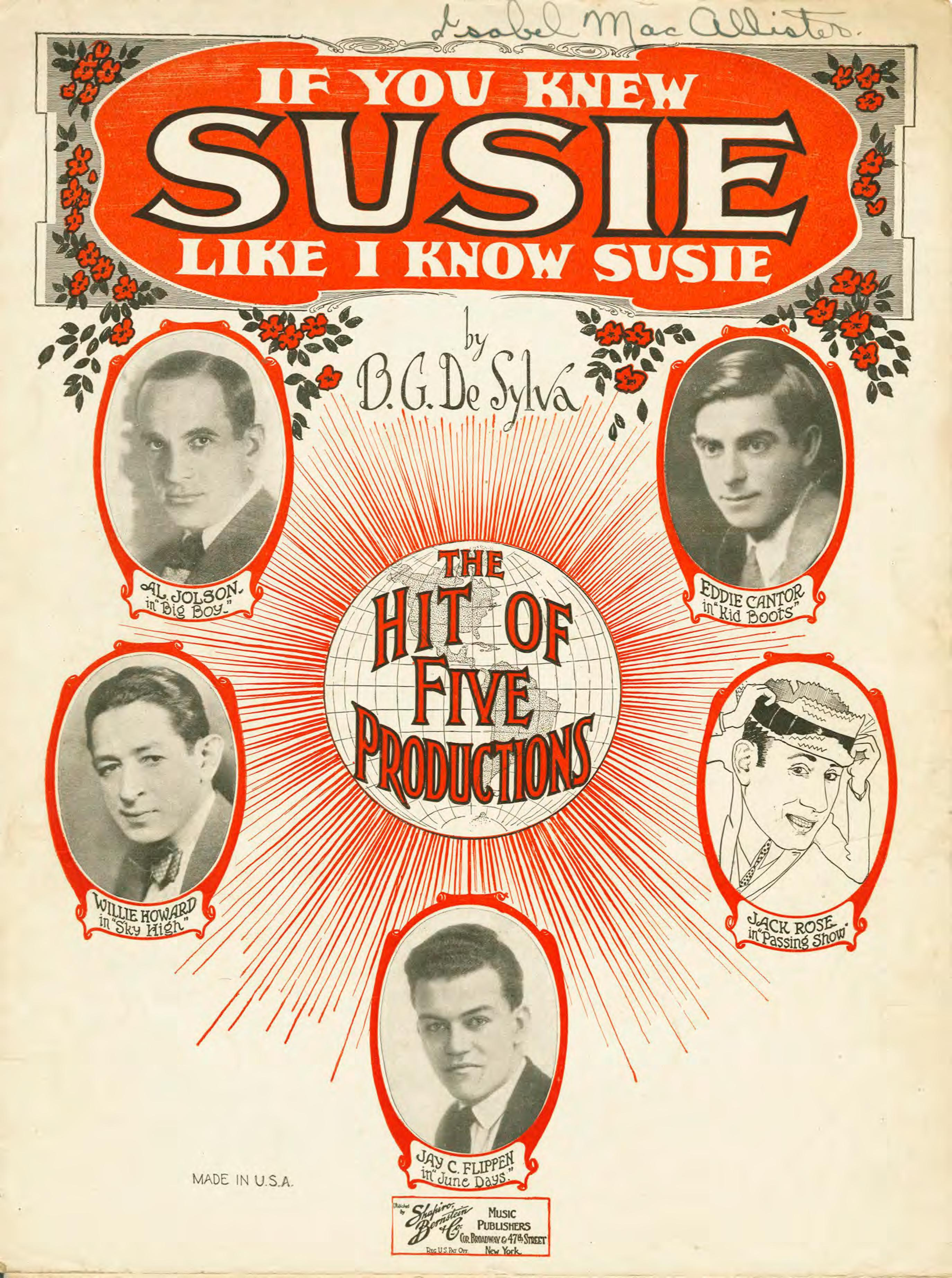
Sheet music cover, 1925

"If You Knew Susie" is the title of a popular song written by Buddy DeSylva and Joseph Meyer. It was published by Shapiro, Bernstein & Co. in 1925. The sheet music included ukulele tabs by Richard Konter. In the largely comic song, a man sings that he knows a certain woman named Susie to be much wilder and more passionate than most people realize.

The song, which was originally written for Al Jolson, became Eddie Cantor's best-known success of the 1920s, recorded on April 6, 1925 and the bestseller for five weeks during the year. Years later, Jolson told Cantor "If I knew it was that good, you dog, I'd never have given it to you!".

== In popular culture ==
- Eddie Cantor (Buddy Doyle) sings this in The Great Ziegfeld (1936).
- The melody is used as a musical theme in the film The Affairs of Susan (1945).
- The song is sung as "If You Knew Susie As We Know Susie" by Frank Sinatra and Gene Kelly in the film Anchors Aweigh (1945), with more suggestive lyrics, such as "She's not choosy".
- The song is sung in Ziegfeld Follies (1946).
- A film by the same name, starring Cantor, was released in 1948.
- The song is sung in the biopic The Eddie Cantor Story (1953).
- The song is arranged and performed by John Serry Sr. and his ensemble for RCA Victor on RCA Thesaurus (1954).
- The song was used in the 1966 film The Silencers, the first of several spy thriller/spoof films starring Dean Martin as Secret Agent Matt Helm. In the opening scenes of the movie, Martin's character "thinks" an altered version of the lyrics, as he imagines romancing one of the film's several lovely ladies. Martin's rendition of the song (with the accurate lyrics) also appeared on the movie's soundtrack album.
- In the film Arthur, Dudley Moore sings the trope "If you knew Susan like I know Susan...". Susan was Moore's character's unfated bride.
- Ruth Cracknell sings the song in several episodes of the television series Mother and Son.
- Phil Hendrie features the song sung by the fictional Dunphy Brothers at Ted's Steakhouse during an episode of the Phil Hendrie show.
- The song is sung by Adam Driver in the film The Man Who Killed Don Quixote (2018).
