= Shark Angling Club of Great Britain =

The Shark Angling Club of Great Britain (SACGB) is headquartered in Looe, Cornwall, and is regarded as the central authority for shark angling in the United Kingdom. Its aims are to promote the sport of shark angling and the conservation of sharks, maintain records of notable shark catches, and foster social links between members.

== Membership ==
Full membership of the club is open to anyone who has caught unaided a shark that weighs more than 75 lbs (34.1 kg), while fishing from a port in the UK. Associate membership is also offered to those who have caught a shark under the qualifying size.

== History ==
The club was founded in 1953 by Brigadier John Alan Lyde Caunter, its first president. The other founder members were:

- Mr Frederick Lyde Caunter
- Mr S. Oliver
- Mr R. C. Roberts
- Mr J. Eathorne
- Mrs H. Eathorne
- Dr Norman Lorraine, F.R.S.
- Mr C. Yarde
- Mr S. Tee
- Mr W. C. Butters
- Mr Edgar Williams

Since 1998, the club has operated a policy of catch and release, whereby sharks are tagged and released after having been measured and weighed. This has contributed to scientific knowledge of the life history of sharks in the Atlantic Ocean and their ecological position as an apex predator.
