= David Vogan =

American mathematician (born 1954)

- Born: September 8, 1954 (age 71); Mercer, Pennsylvania
- Education: The University of Chicago; Massachusetts Institute of Technology
- Known for: Lusztig-Vogan polynomials Vogan diagram Minimal K-type; Vogan's conjecture for Dirac cohomology Signature character
- Awards: Levi L. Conant Prize (2011)
- Scientific career
- Fields: Mathematics
- Workplaces: Massachusetts Institute of Technology
- Thesis: Lie algebra cohomology and the representations of semisimple Lie groups (1976)
- Doctoral advisor: Bertram Kostant
- Doctoral students: Jing-Song Huang; Monica Nevins; Peter Trapa

David Alexander Vogan Jr. (born September 8, 1954) is a mathematician at the Massachusetts Institute of Technology who works on unitary representations of simple Lie groups.

While studying at the University of Chicago, he became a Putnam Fellow in 1972. He received his Ph.D. from M.I.T. in 1976, under the supervision of Bertram Kostant. In his thesis, he introduced the notion of lowest K type in the course of obtaining an algebraic classification of irreducible Harish Chandra modules. He is currently one of the participants in the Atlas of Lie Groups and Representations.

Vogan was elected to the American Academy of Arts and Sciences in 1996. He served as head of the Department of Mathematics at MIT from 1999 to 2004. In 2012 he became Fellow of the American Mathematical Society. He was president of the AMS in 2013–2014. He was elected to the National Academy of Sciences in 2013. He was the Norbert Wiener Chair of Mathematics at MIT until his retirement in 2020, and is currently the Norbert Wiener Emeritus Professor of Mathematics.

== Publications ==
- Representations of real reductive Lie groups. Birkhäuser, 1981
- Unitary representations of reductive Lie groups. Princeton University Press, 1987 ISBN 0-691-08482-3
- with Paul Sally (ed.): Representation theory and harmonic analysis on semisimple Lie groups. American Mathematical Society, 1989
- with Jeffrey Adams & Dan Barbasch (ed.): The Langlands Classification and Irreducible Characters for Real Reductive Groups. Birkhäuser, 1992
- with Anthony W. Knapp: Cohomological Induction and Unitary Representations. Princeton University Press, 1995 ISBN 0-691-03756-6
- with Joseph A. Wolf and Juan Tirao (ed.): Geometry and representation theory of real and p-adic groups. Birkhäuser, 1998
- with Jeffrey Adams (ed.): Representation theory of Lie groups. American Mathematical Society, 2000
- The Character Table for E_{8}. In: Notices of the American Mathematical Society Nr. 9, 2007 (PDF)
