= Southern Extreme Bull Riding Association =

- Sport: Rodeo (bull riding and barrel racing)
- Founded: 1994
- Countries: United States
- Most recent champions: (United States) Nic Jackson, pro bull rider (United States) Mea Springer, barrel racer (United States) JaDean Raber, novice bull rider
- Website: GoSebra.com

The Southern Extreme Bull Riding Association (SEBRA) is an American semi-professional rodeo organization. It sanctions events in the Southeastern and Midwestern United States.

== History ==
SEBRA was founded in Archdale, North Carolina, in 1994 by Jerome Davis, a co-founder of the Professional Bull Riders (PBR). Its headquarters are still in Archdale. His intent with SEBRA was to establish a bull riding association to help young athletes get started in the sport.

With the strong growth of the PBR, Davis soon stepped down from SEBRA. He was succeeded as president by Chan Canter. Within five years, SEBRA had grown from sanctioning 150 events per year to more than 400 events across the United States.

SEBRA runs and promotes schools and clinics to help bull riders advance to professional events. SEBRA also helps its producers develop stronger shows with higher attendance and a higher caliber of bull riders. PBR riders such as J.B. Mauney, Brian Canter, Billy Robinson, and Josh Faircloth all started in SEBRA events.

SEBRA also works on increasing its fan base. SEBRA's smallest venues can accommodate 800 fans, while other performances can attract crowds of 5,000 people a night. Thousands of fans now follow SEBRA bull riders and events through the SEBRA website and social media. SEBRA provides its bull riders more than $500,000 in cash payouts from their regular events each year. Each year, the top 40 SEBRA bull riders are invited to the SEBRA National Finals to compete for more than $60,000 in cash and awards. SEBRA also sanctions barrel racing at their events. SEBRA also used to sanction bareback and saddle bronc riding at some of their events. Since 2023, SEBRA also has the Crossfire Division for novice-level bull riders.

== Season champions ==
=== Bull Riding ===
Season	Champion	Hometown
1994	Wayne Steed	Archdale, North Carolina
1995	Jeff Canter	Archdale, North Carolina
1996	Jeff Canter	Archdale, North Carolina
1997	Boyce Knox	Statesville, North Carolina
1998	No finals this year.	
1999	Billy Robinson	Galax, Virginia
2000	Jeff Canter	Archdale, North Carolina
2001	Andy Setliff	Stonesville, North Carolina
2002	Chris Dudley	King, North Carolina
2003	Jeremy May	Rural Hall, North Carolina
2004	Brian Canter	Randleman, North Carolina
2005	Troy Carnes	Quincy, Minnesota
2006	Ryan Radford	Mount Ulla, North Carolina
2007	Rick Wagner	Rockwell, North Carolina
2008	Trinity Dunkelberger	Gerrardstown, West Virginia
2009	Chad Van Amburg	Archdale, North Carolina
2010	Jeff Askey	Beech Creek, Pennsylvania
2011	Michael Lane	North Tazewell, Virginia
2012	Gage Gay	Staley, North Carolina
2013	Jason Tinsman	Farmland, Indiana
2014	Cody Martin	Butler, Georgia
2015	Cody Martin	Butler, Georgia
2016	Brenton Chaffin	Floyd, Virginia
2017	Daniel Tinsman	Farmland, Indiana
2018	Daniel Tinsman	Farmland, Indiana
2019	Hayden Townsend	Morral, Ohio
2020-2021	Marcus Mast	Middlebury, Indiana
2022	Tyler Manor	Portland, Indiana
2023	Austin Beaty	Glade Hill, Virginia
2024	Tyler Greer	Horse Cave, Kentucky
2025	Nic Jackson	Upper Marlboro, Maryland

=== Barrel Racing ===
Season	Champion	Hometown
2008	Tiffiney Sims	Stanardsville, Virginia
2009	Sissy Sams	Stafford, Virginia
2010	Teresa Roberts	South Point, Ohio
2011	Teresa Roberts	South Point, Ohio
2012	Teresa Roberts	South Point, Ohio
2013	Holly Thomas	Mebane, North Carolina
2014	Teresa Roberts	South Point, Ohio
2015	Paige Reynolds	Reisterstown, Maryland
2016	Kristin Yde	Benson, North Carolina
2017	Megan Wilkin	Clarksville, Ohio
2018	Madison Iager	Woodbine, Maryland
2019	Chris Boham	Marengo, Ohio
2020-2021	Doreen Ulery	Mount Pleasant, Pennsylvania
2022	Reed Dale	Powhatan, Virginia
2023	Jordan Lacks	Goode, Virginia
2024	Jordan Lacks	Goode, Virginia
2025	Mea Springer	Masontown, Pennsylvania

=== Crossfire Division Bull Riding (Novice) ===
Season	Champion	Hometown
2023	Nic Jackson	Upper Marlboro, Maryland
2024	Nic Jackson	Upper Marlboro, Maryland
2025	JaDean Raber	Baltic, Ohio

=== Bareback Bronc Riding (Defunct) ===
Season	Champion	Residence
2015	Cody Warnock	Ohatchee, Alabama
2016	Chris Smith	Lafayette, Georgia

=== Saddle Bronc Riding (Defunct) ===
Season	Champion	Residence
2015	Bud Humphries	Cowpens, South Carolina
2016	Chad Alesky	Monroeton, Pennsylvania
