= Ember from the Sun =

1995 novel by Mark Canter

Ember from the Sun is a novel by Mark Canter published by New English Library in 1995.

== Plot summary ==
Ember from the Sun is a novel in which Yute Nahadeh discovers a frozen pregnant Neanderthal in an ice cave, and implants her fetus in a modern surrogate mother who names the Neanderthal baby Ember.

== Reception ==
Richard Jones reviewed Ember from the Sun for Arcane magazine, rating it an 5 out of 10 overall. Jones comments that "Canter could have chosen a bizarre ending, an apocalyptic one, a happy or a sad one. Instead he goes for the Crap Ending option and you come away feeling cheated and used. Shame, really. I was willing to forgive the various failures in plot and style because I was quite getting into the Neanderthals."

Kirkus Reviews states "An effective blend of scientific fact and shamanistic fancy, one that weaves a genuinely magic spell."

Publishers Weekly states: "Canter's approach fails to do his premise, or his characters, particularly the appealing Ember, full justice."

Entertainment Weekly rated the book a "C" and states that "Ember from the Sun's plucked straight from the pulp fantasies of Edgar Rice Burroughs."

== Reviews ==
- Review by Helen Gould (1995) in Vector 186
- Review by Paul J. McAuley (1996) in Interzone, #104 February 1996
- Kliatt
