= Jeffrey Adams (mathematician) =

American mathematician

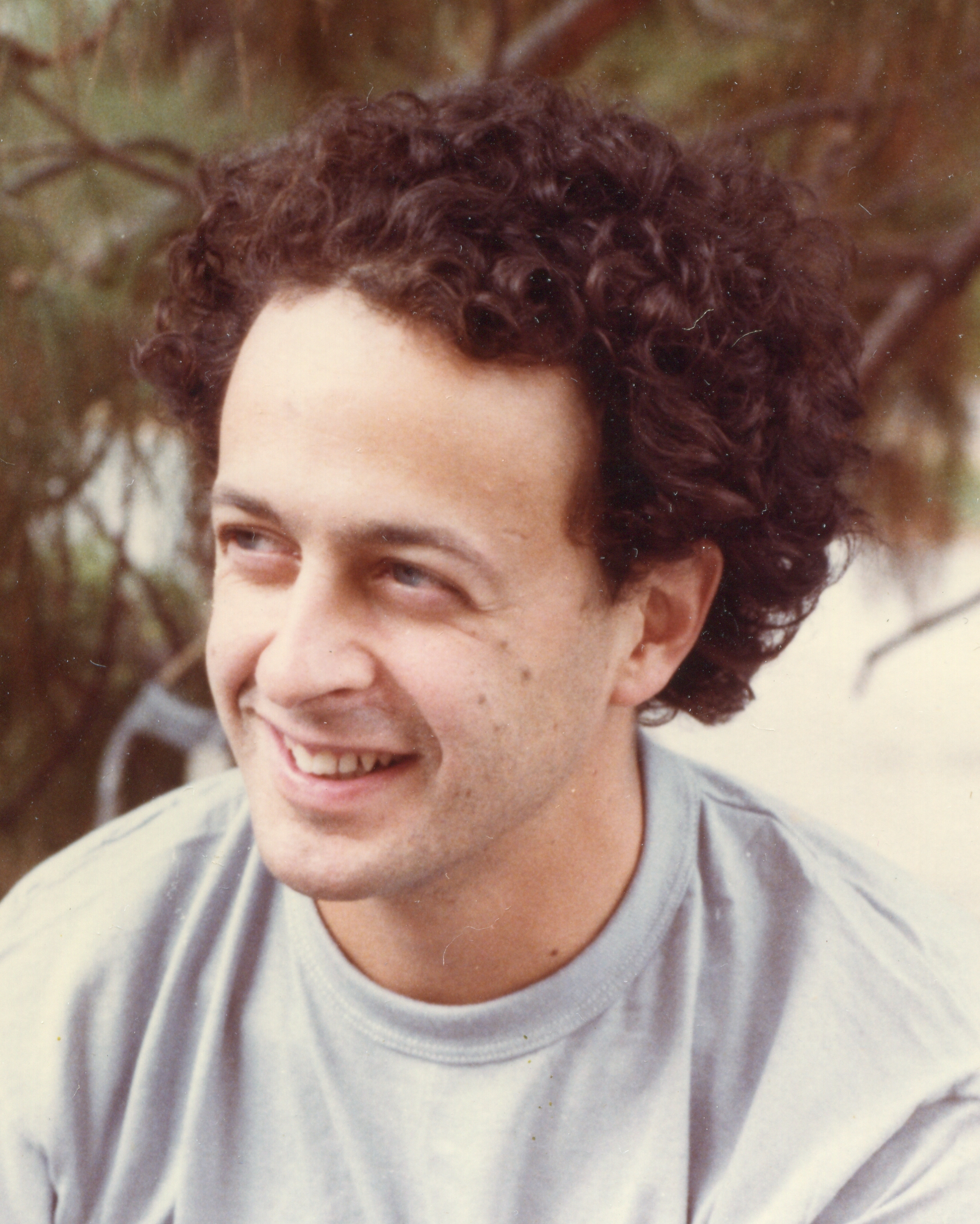
Jeffrey Adams in 1983

Jeffrey David Adams (born 1956) is a mathematician at the University of Maryland who works on unitary representations of reductive Lie groups and who led the project Atlas of Lie Groups and Representations that calculated the characters of the representations of E_{8}. The project to calculate the representations of E_{8} has been compared to the Human Genome Project in scope. Together with Dan Barbasch and David Vogan, he co-authored a monograph on a geometric approach to the Langlands classification and Arthur's conjectures in the real case.

He completed his Ph.D. at Yale University under the supervision of Gregg Zuckerman in 1981. In 2012, he became a fellow of the American Mathematical Society.
