= Jing-Song Huang =

Jing-Song Huang is a Chair Professor in the Department of Mathematics of Hong Kong University of Science and Technology. His research interests are representations of Lie groups and harmonic analysis. After graduating from Peking University, he went to Massachusetts Institute of Technology and received his PhD degree in 1989, under the supervision of David Vogan.

Joint with Pavle Pandzic from University of Zagreb, Croatia, Huang proved a conjecture of David Vogan on Dirac cohomology, published in the Journal of the American Mathematical Society.

== Selected publications ==
- Huang, Jing-Song; Pandzic, Pavle (2006). Dirac Operators in Representation Theory. Birkhauser. ISBN 978-0-8176-3218-2.
- Huang, Jing-Song; Pandžić, Pavle (2002-01-01). "Dirac cohomology, unitary representations and a proof of a conjecture of Vogan". Journal of the American Mathematical Society. 15 (1): 185–202. doi:10.1090/S0894-0347-01-00383-6. ISSN 0894-0347.
- Huang, Jing-Song (1999). Lectures on Representation Theory. World Scientific Publishing Co. doi:10.1142/3988. ISBN 978-981-02-3724-0.
- Huang, Jing-Song; Pandžić, Pavle; Savin, Gordan (1996). "New dual pair correspondences". Duke Mathematical Journal. 82 (2): 447–471. doi:10.1215/S0012-7094-96-08220-4. ISSN 0012-7094.
- Huang, Jing-Song (1990). "The unitary dual of the universal covering group of GL(n, R)". Duke Mathematical Journal. 61 (3): 705–745. doi:10.1215/S0012-7094-90-06126-5. ISSN 0012-7094.

== Awards and honors ==
Huang was a recipient of the State Natural Science Award of China (second class) in 2002, and Senior Research Fellowship in 2004 by the Croucher Foundation.
