= Loli Kantor =

American photographer

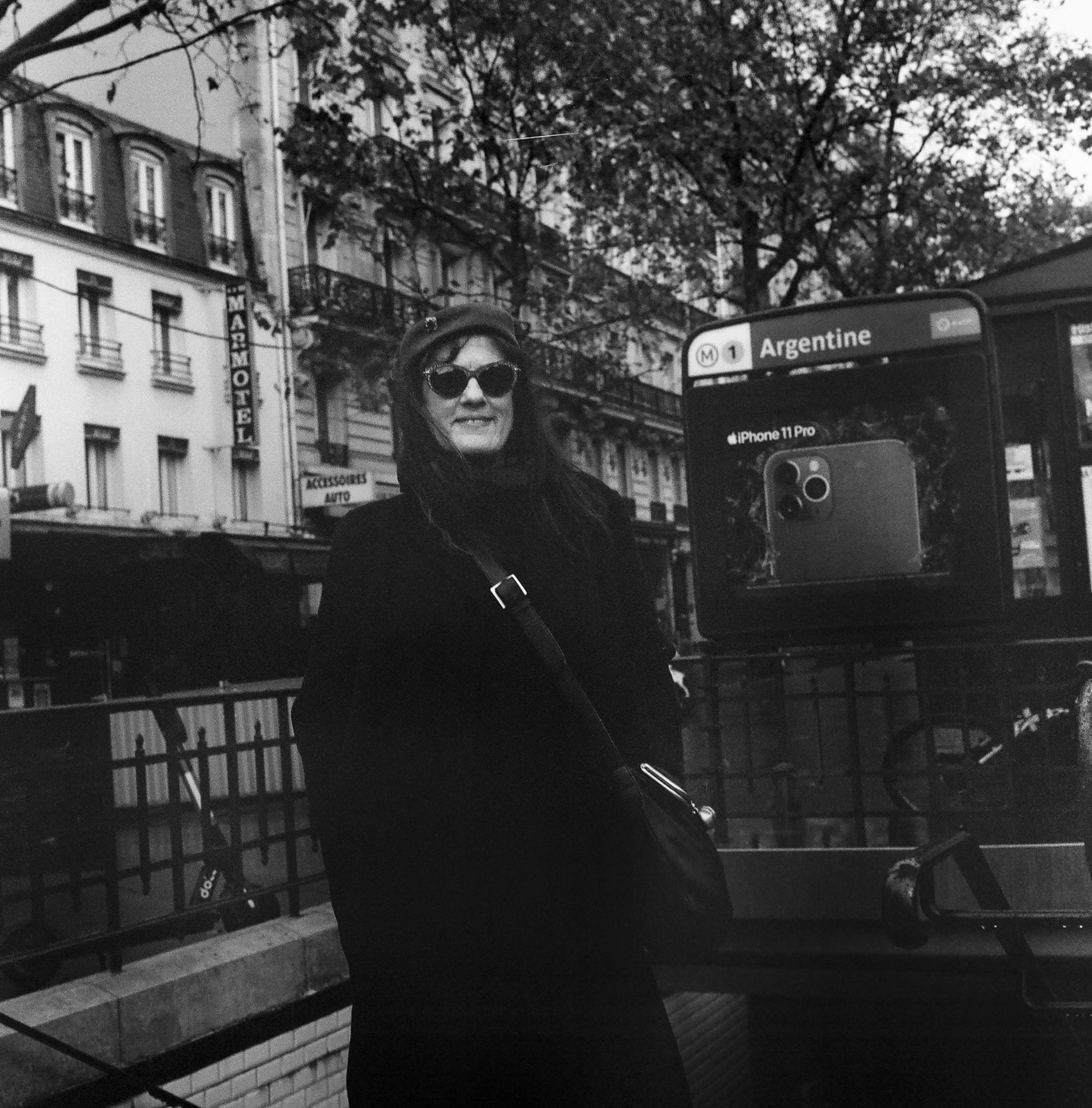

Loli Kantor (born 1952) is an Israeli-American photographer. Kantor was born in France.

Her work is included in the collection of the Museum of Fine Arts, Houston and the Harry Ransom Center at the University of Texas at Austin.

Kantor is the author of Beyond the Forest: Jewish Presence in Eastern Europe, 2004-2012.
