= Mathilda B. Canter =

American psychologist (1924–2015)

- Born: Mathilda Bushel; June 8, 1924; Brooklyn, New York
- Died: January 30, 2015 (aged 90); Phoenix, Arizona
- Education: Arizona State University
- Occupation: Psychologist

Mathilda Bushel Canter (June 8, 1924 – January 30, 2015) was an American psychologist and leader in state and national psychological organizations. Known as the "First Lady of Arizona Psychology" for her service to her state board and state association of psychology, she was the first female president of the American Psychological Association (APA) Division of Psychotherapy (Division 29). She won multiple national awards for career achievement in psychological practice.

== Biography ==
Canter was born Mathilda Bushel in Brooklyn. She was the youngest child in her family, and she took to academics early in life. When Bushel was 4 1/2 years old, Bushel's mother asked the local school to allow the child to attend classes with her siblings. At the age of 15, Bushel enrolled at Brooklyn College.

After completing an undergraduate degree in sociology, she pursued a master's degree at Columbia University, completing all of the requirements except for a thesis. She married Army psychologist Aaron Canter, and the couple moved to Arizona in 1949. Canter stayed home to raise her children for a few years, then earned a master's degree and Ph.D. in psychology at Arizona State University, becoming the second woman to earn a Ph.D. at the university. In 1966, after completing an internship at the Phoenix Veterans Hospital, Canter went into the practice of clinical psychology.

Canter lived in Arizona for the rest of her life and she was a longtime member of the APA and the Arizona Psychological Association (AzPA). A past president and board member of the AzPA, Canter became known as the "First Lady of Arizona Psychology". From 1976 to 1986, she served on the Arizona Board of Psychologist Examiners; as chair of the group, she advocated for a statute that required a doctoral degree for licensure as an Arizona psychologist. She became an authority on ethical issues in psychology, chairing the APA Ethics Committee and leading the effort to publish the organization's Ethical Principles and Code of Conduct (1992).

She received two awards from the APA recognizing her service to the practice of psychology: the Gold Medal Award for Achievement in Practice (2002) and the Award for Distinguished Contributions to Applied Psychology as a Professional Practice (2000). She was a fellow of seven APA divisions. As of 2008, Canter was semi-retired, seeing a small number of patients for psychotherapy. She treated patients until the fall of 2014. Canter died in Phoenix in January 2015.
