= Joe Kantor =

American football player (1942–2021)

No. 31
- Position: Halfback

Personal information
- Born: December 17, 1942; Parma Heights, Ohio, U.S.
- Died: October 2, 2021 (aged 78)
- Listed height: 6 ft 1 in (1.85 m)
- Listed weight: 218 lb (99 kg)

Career information
- High school: Saint Ignatius (Cleveland, Ohio)
- College: Notre Dame

Career history
- 1966: Washington Redskins

Awards and highlights
- National champion (1964)
- Stats at Pro Football Reference

Joseph John Kantor Jr. (December 17, 1942 — October 2, 2021) was an American football halfback in the National Football League (NFL) for the Washington Redskins. He played college football at the University of Notre Dame.
