= Marc van Leeuwen =

Dutch mathematician

- Born: May 1, 1960 (age 66); Castricum, Netherlands
- Education: Utrecht University
- Scientific career
- Fields: Mathematics
- Workplaces: University of Poitiers
- Doctoral advisor: T. A. Springer

Marc A. A. Van Leeuwen (born May 1, 1960) is a Dutch mathematician at the University of Poitiers. He is a project member of the atlas of Lie groups and representations.

Van Leeuwen attended the Utrecht University, where he obtained his doctorate in 1989, under supervision of T. A. Springer.
