= Minimal K-type =

In mathematics, a minimal K-type is a representation of a maximal compact subgroup K of a semisimple Lie group G that is in some sense the smallest representation of K occurring in a Harish-Chandra module of G. Minimal K-types were introduced by Vogan as part of an algebraic description of the Langlands classification.
