= Ponsworthy =

Hamlet in Devon, England

Coordinates: 50.550°N 3.835°W

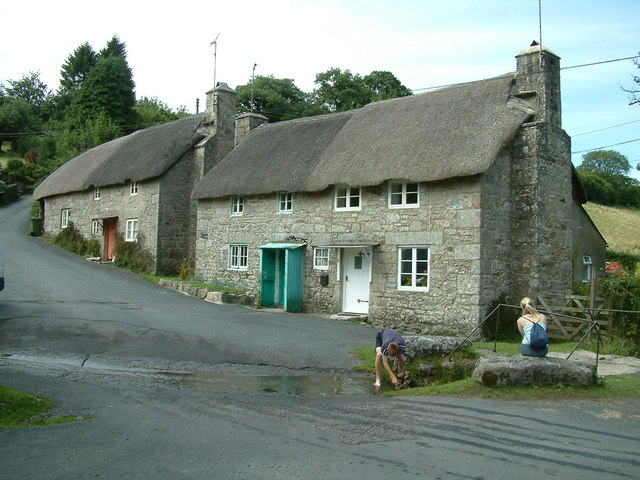
Thatched cottages and the "splash" at Ponsworthy

Ponsworthy is a hamlet on the eastern side of Dartmoor, Devon, England. It lies in the steep valley of the West Webburn River about 3.5 km (2.2 mi) southwest of the village of Widecombe-in-the-Moor.

Its row of picturesque thatched cottages, climbing up a steep hill, are often the subject of calendars and postcards. It also has a mill and old bakehouse, converted to a house in 1976. Ponsworthy House, built c.1800, has a porch with Doric columns of granite. At the foot of the hill is the ‘Ponsworthy Splash’, where vehicles must drive through a small stream which runs across the road.

The village is also well known for Ponsworthy Bridge over the West Webburn River. It has a single arch and contains a stone engraved with the dates 1666 and 1792 - believed to be when repairs were carried out. It was further repaired in 1911. The bridge has a 7.5 foot (2.3 m) width restriction, which is one of the reasons the village is so quiet, for it is impassable to modern coaches.
