= Kantner =

Kantner is a German locational surname, which originally meant a person from places called named Kanten in Prussia or Silesia. Alternatively, Kanter can be an occupational surname for a maker of wooden racks or trestles for alcohol barrels, derived from the Middle High German kanter ("barrel rack"). The name may refer to:

- China Kantner (born 1971), American actress
- Harold D. Kantner (1886–1973), American aviator
- Konrad V Kantner (1385–1439), Polish duke
- Paul Kantner (1941–2016), American musician
- Seth Kantner (born 1965), American writer

== See also ==
- Cantner, surname
