= Jay Cantor =

American novelist and essayist

- Born: 1948 (age 77–78); New York City, U.S.
- Education: Harvard University (BA); University of California, Santa Cruz (PhD)
- Occupations: Novelist; essayist
- Spouse: Melinda Marble
- Children: 1

Jay Cantor (born 1948 New York City) is an American novelist and essayist.

He graduated from Harvard University with a BA, and from University of California, Santa Cruz with a Ph.D. He teaches at Tufts University. He lives in Cambridge, Massachusetts, with his wife, Melinda Marble, and their daughter, Grace.

His work appeared in The Harvard Crimson. He was on the 2009 ArtScience Competition jury.

== Awards ==
- 1989 MacArthur Fellows Program

== Works ==
=== Novels ===
- The Death of Che Guevara, Knopf, 1983, ISBN 978-0-394-51767-4
- Krazy Kat: a novel in five panels, Knopf, 1988, ISBN 978-0-394-55025-1
- Great Neck: a novel, Knopf, 2003, ISBN 978-0-375-41394-0
- Forgiving the Angel: Four Stories for Franz Kafka, Knopf, 2014, ISBN 978-0385350341

=== Essays ===
- The Space Between: Literature and Politics, Johns Hopkins University Press, 1982, ISBN 978-0-8018-2672-6
- On Giving Birth to One's Own Mother. Knopf, 1991, ISBN 978-0-394-58752-3
