= John Alan Lyde Caunter =

British Army officer and shark angler (1889–1981)

Brigadier John Alan Lyde Caunter CBE MC & Bar
- Born: 17 December 1889; Banwell, United Kingdom
- Died: 20 April 1981 (aged 91); East Looe, United Kingdom
- Military career
- Allegiance: United Kingdom
- Branch: British Army
- Rank: Brigadier
- Service number: 12034
- Units: Gloucestershire Regiment; Royal Tank Regiment
- Commands: 1st Battalion, Royal Tank Corps; 4th Armoured Brigade
- Conflicts: First World War; Second World War
- Awards: Commander of the Order of the British Empire; Military Cross

Brigadier John Alan Lyde Caunter, CBE, MC & Bar (17 December 1889 – 20 April 1981) was a senior British Army officer and a pioneer shark angler off the British coast. He published an account of his escape from Germany as a prisoner of war in World War I.

== Military career ==
John Alan Lyde Caunter was born in Banwell, Somerset to Richard Lawrence Caunter, a medical practitioner from Liskeard, Cornwall and Johanna Wilhelmina Koerber of Leith, Scotland. The family on the father's side were descended from the Caunters of Ashburton, Devon, whose history was detailed by John's cousin Frederick Lyde Caunter. John's middle names go back to the Reverend John Alan Lyde, whose daughter Marian Lyde married the woollen manufacturer Richard Caunter in Ashburton in 1826. Educated at Uppingham School and the Royal Military College, Sandhurst, John was commissioned into the Gloucestershire Regiment in 1909.

John Caunter was captured by German forces in October 1914. He spent most of the war in German captivity before escaping from a camp at Schwarmstedt in summer 1917. He managed to cross into the neutral Netherlands and reached England still wearing his POW clothes. The following year he published 13 Days: The Chronicle of an Escape from a German Prison. While John was in captivity his younger brother Richard, a second lieutenant in the Gloucestershire Regiment, was killed in action in Mesopotamia at the end of 1916.

Caunter went on to serve with the British Salonika Army in 1918. On 13 February 1920 he married Helen Margaret Napier Napier in Churt, Surrey, where both lived at the time. A daughter, Pamela Margaret Napier, was born in 1921 and a son, John Richard Lyde, in 1924, both in Farnham, Surrey. Caunter became commanding officer of the 1st Battalion, Royal Tank Corps in Egypt in 1935 and became commander of 4th Armoured Brigade in the Western Desert campaign in January 1940, in which role he saw action at the Battle of Beda Fomm in Libya in February 1941. He became Deputy Director of Staff Duties, Armoured Troops at GHQ India in 1941 before retiring in 1944.

His wife having died suddenly in New Delhi in 1942, Caunter married Muriel Lilian Murphy, born Hicks, in Liskeard in 1945.

== Shark angling ==
Caunter began fishing for sharks off the coast of Cornwall around 1945, and in 1953 founded the Shark Angling Club of Great Britain, serving as its first president. He was also a member for Great Britain of the International Committee of the International Game Fish Association, and a member of the British Tunny Club. Caunter further sat on the Sea Fisheries Committee and began the Looe Sea Angling Festival. His Shark Angling in Great Britain (1961) was the first book published in Britain to deal with sharks and shark fishing off the British coast. From 1952 to 1967 he served on the Looe Urban District Council. Brigadier Caunter died in East Looe, Cornwall, in 1981.

== Works ==
Books

- Caunter, J. A. L. (1918). 13 Days: The Chronicle of an Escape from a German Prison. G Bell and Sons. (Digitised version of this book, with illustrations by the author.)
- Caunter, J. A. L. (1958). A short guide to shark angling at Looe and other places in S.W. England. J. A. L. Caunter.
- Caunter, J. A. L. (1961). Shark Angling in Great Britain. George Allen & Unwin Ltd.

Painting

- Caunter, John Alan Lyde (1948). The Sun breaks through by Brig. National Trust.
