= Atlas of Lie groups and representations =

Mathematical project

The Atlas of Lie Groups and Representations is a mathematical project to solve the problem of the unitary dual for real reductive Lie groups.

As of March 2008, the following mathematicians are listed as members:

- Jeffrey Adams
- Dan Barbasch
- Birne Binegar
- Bill Casselman
- Dan Ciubotaru
- Fokko du Cloux
- Scott Crofts
- Steve Jackson
- Alfred Noël
- Tatiana Howard
- Alessandra Pantano
- Annegret Paul
- Patrick Polo
- Siddhartha Sahi
- Susana Salamanca
- John Stembridge
- Peter Trapa
- Marc van Leeuwen
- David Vogan
- Wai-Ling Yee
- Jiu-Kang Yu
- Gregg Zuckerman
