= Thompson sporadic group =

Sporadic simple group

In the area of modern algebra known as group theory, the Thompson group Th is a sporadic simple group of order

90,745,943,887,872,000
= 2^{15} · 3^{10} · 5^{3} · 7^{2} · 13 · 19 · 31
≈ 9×10^{16}.

== History ==
Th is one of the 26 sporadic groups and was found by John G. Thompson (1976) and constructed by Smith (1976). They constructed it as the automorphism group of a certain lattice in the 248-dimensional Lie algebra of E_{8}. It does not preserve the Lie bracket of this lattice, but does preserve the Lie bracket mod 3, so is a subgroup of the Chevalley group E_{8}(3). The subgroup preserving the Lie bracket (over the integers) is a maximal subgroup of the Thompson group called the Dempwolff group (which unlike the Thompson group is a subgroup of the compact Lie group E_{8}).

== Representations ==
The centralizer of an element of order 3 of type 3C in the Monster group is a product of the Thompson group and a group of order 3, as a result of which the Thompson group acts on a vertex operator algebra over the field with 3 elements. This vertex operator algebra contains the E_{8} Lie algebra over F_{3}, giving the embedding of Th into E_{8}(3).

The full normalizer of a 3C element in the Monster group is S_{3} × Th, so Th centralizes 3 involutions alongside the 3-cycle. These involutions are centralized by the Baby monster group, which therefore contains Th as a subgroup.

The Schur multiplier and the outer automorphism group of the Thompson group are both trivial.

== Generalized monstrous moonshine ==
Conway and Norton suggested in their 1979 paper that monstrous moonshine is not limited to the monster, but that similar phenomena may be found for other groups. Larissa Queen and others subsequently found that one can construct the expansions of many Hauptmoduln from simple combinations of dimensions of sporadic groups. For Th, the relevant McKay-Thompson series is $T_{3C}(\tau)$ (OEIS: A007245),

$$T_{3C}(\tau) = \Big(j(3\tau)\Big)^{1/3} = \frac{1}{q}\,+\,248q^2\,+\,4124q^5\,+\,34752q^8\,+\,213126q^{11}\,+\,1057504q^{14}+\cdots\,$$

and j(τ) is the j-invariant.

== Maximal subgroups ==
Linton (1989) found the 16 conjugacy classes of maximal subgroups of Th as follows:

Maximal subgroups of Th
No.	Structure	Order	Index	Comments
1	^{3}D_{4}(2) : 3	634,023,936 = 2^{12}·3^{5}·7^{2}·13	143,127,000 = 2^{3}·3^{5}·5^{3}·19·31	
2	2^{5 ·}L_{5}(2)	319,979,520 = 2^{15}·3^{2}·5·7·31	283,599,225 = 3^{8}·5^{2}·7·13·19	the Dempwolff group
3	2^{1+8}_{+}^{·}A_{9}	92,897,280 = 2^{15}·3^{4}·5·7	976,841,775 = 3^{6}·5^{2}·7·13·19·31	centralizer of involution
4	U_{3}(8) : 6	33,094,656 = 2^{10}·3^{5}·7·19	2,742,012,000 = 2^{5}·3^{5}·5^{3}·7·13·31	
5	(3 x G_{2}(3)) : 2	25,474,176 = 2^{7}·3^{7}·7·13	3,562,272,000 = 2^{8}·3^{3}·5^{3}·7·19·31	normalizer of a subgroup of order 3 (class 3A)
6	(3^{3} × 3^{1+2}_{+}) · 3^{1+2}_{+} : 2S_{4}	944,784 = 2^{4}·3^{10}	96,049,408,000 = 2^{11}·5^{3}·7^{2}·13·19·31	normalizer of a subgroup of order 3 (class 3B)
7	3^{2} · 3^{7} : 2S_{4}	944,784 = 2^{4}·3^{10}	96,049,408,000 = 2^{11}·5^{3}·7^{2}·13·19·31	
8	(3 × 3^{4} : 2 · A_{6}) : 2	349,920 = 2^{5}·3^{7}·5	259,333,401,600 = 2^{10}·3^{3}·5^{2}·7^{2}·13·19·31	normalizer of a subgroup of order 3 (class 3C)
9	5^{1+2}_{+} : 4S_{4}	12,000 = 2^{5}·3·5^{3}	7,562,161,990,656 = 2^{10}·3^{9}·7^{2}·13·19·31	normalizer of a subgroup of order 5
10	5^{2} : GL_{2}(5)	12,000 = 2^{5}·3·5^{3}	7,562,161,990,656 = 2^{10}·3^{9}·7^{2}·13·19·31	
11	7^{2} : (3 × 2S_{4})	7,056 = 2^{4}·3^{2}·7^{2}	12,860,819,712,000 = 2^{11}·3^{8}·5^{3}·13·19·31	
12	L_{2}(19) : 2	6,840 = 2^{3}·3^{2}·5·19	13,266,950,860,800 = 2^{12}·3^{8}·5^{2}·7^{2}·13·31	
13	L_{3}(3)	5,616 = 2^{4}·3^{3}·13	16,158,465,792,000 = 2^{11}·3^{7}·5^{3}·7^{2}·19·31	
14	M_{10}	720 = 2^{4}·3^{2}·5	126,036,033,177,600 = 2^{11}·3^{8}·5^{2}·7^{2}·13·19·31	
15	31 : 15	465 = 3·5·31	195,152,567,500,800 = 2^{15}·3^{9}·5^{2}·7^{2}·13·19	
16	S_{5}	120 = 2^{3}·3·5	756,216,199,065,600 = 2^{12}·3^{9}·5^{2}·7^{2}·13·19·31	
