= Kantor double =

In mathematics, the Kantor double is a Jordan superalgebra structure on the sum of two copies of a Poisson algebra. It is named after Isaiah Kantor, who introduced it in 1990.
