= Albert algebra =

In mathematics, an Albert algebra is a 27-dimensional exceptional Jordan algebra. They are named after Abraham Adrian Albert, who pioneered the study of non-associative algebras, usually working over the real numbers. Over the real numbers, there are three such Jordan algebras up to isomorphism. One of them, which was first mentioned by Pascual Jordan, John von Neumann, and Eugene Wigner (1934) and studied by Albert (1934), is the set of 3×3 self-adjoint matrices over the octonions, equipped with the binary operation

$$x \circ y = \frac12 (x \cdot y + y \cdot x),$$

where $\cdot$ denotes matrix multiplication. Another is defined the same way, but using split octonions instead of octonions. The final is constructed from the non-split octonions using a different standard involution.

Over any algebraically closed field, there is just one Albert algebra, and its automorphism group G is the simple split group of type F_{4}. (For example, the complexifications of the three Albert algebras over the real numbers are isomorphic Albert algebras over the complex numbers.) Because of this, for a general field F, the Albert algebras are classified by the Galois cohomology group H^{1}(F,G).

The Kantor–Koecher–Tits construction applied to an Albert algebra gives a form of the E7 Lie algebra. The split Albert algebra is used in a construction of a 56-dimensional structurable algebra whose automorphism group has identity component the simply-connected algebraic group of type E_{6}.

The space of cohomological invariants of Albert algebras over a field F (of characteristic not 2) with coefficients in Z/2Z is a free module over the cohomology ring of F with a basis 1, f_{3}, f_{5}, of degrees 0, 3, 5. The cohomological invariants with 3-torsion coefficients have a basis 1, g_{3} of degrees 0, 3. The invariants f_{3} and g_{3} are the primary components of the Rost invariant.

== See also ==
- Euclidean Jordan algebra for the Jordan algebras considered by Jordan, von Neumann and Wigner
- Euclidean Hurwitz algebra for details of the construction of the Albert algebra for the octonions
