= Mark Canter =

American journalist and author

- Born: 11 August 1952; Owensboro, Kentucky, United States
- Occupations: Journalist, author, teacher
- Writing career
- Language: English
- Genres: Science fiction, spirituality

Mark Canter (born August 11, 1952) is an American journalist, author, and teacher.

Born to Nathan Canter, an orthopedic surgeon, and Bette Lou Canter (née Miller), an LPN, he was raised in the only Jewish family in a tiny farming community in Maceo, Kentucky (pop. 400). In his 20s and 30s, he worked a diverse range of jobs, including surgical orderly, rock-show stagehand, and licensed massage therapist.

Canter received a degree in journalism in 1982 from the University of Florida and worked for several Florida newspapers before becoming senior editor of Men's Health magazine. His articles have also appeared in The Miami Sun, St. Petersburg Times, The Baltimore Sun, San Francisco Chronicle, and Yoga Journal, among other periodicals.

His first novel, Ember from the Sun (1997), is the story of Ember, a Neanderthal girl born in the 20th century after a Neanderthal fetus is discovered in a frozen corpse and implanted into a surrogate mother. It was translated into nine languages. His second novel, Down to Heaven, about a Ming dynasty colony in South America, was translated into three languages.

Going back to college at age 50, Canter earned a master's degree in Interdisciplinary Humanities, with a concentration in comparative religion, and subsequently taught Introduction to World Religions for seven years at Florida State University. He briefly taught a graduate course at FSU called Writing Science Fiction and Fantasy, and was a guest columnist for a year for Romantic Times magazine. Upon retiring, he wrote Awakening to the Obvious, a collection of essays on nondual spirituality. He became a certified yoga instructor and currently teaches ashtanga yoga, yoga flow, and mindfulness meditation.

== Published works ==
- Ember from the Sun (1997). ISBN 0385314574.
- Down to Heaven (1998).
- The Bastard (2015).
- Orchard of My Eye (2012).
- Second Nature (2011).
- Awakening to the Obvious (2013). ISBN 1493599666.
