= Arlene S. Kanter =

American lawyer

Arlene S. Kanter is an American academic, lawyer and a Bond, Schoeneck & King Distinguished Professor of Law at Syracuse University College of Law. In 2005, she was named the Laura J. and L. Douglas Meredith Professor of Teaching Excellence by Syracuse University. She is the founder and director of the Disability Law and Policy Program and director of the Office of International Programs. She publishes and lectures extensively on US and international disability law and policy.

== Early life and education ==
Kanter was born and raised in Newton Centre, Massachusetts. Kanter is a graduate of Trinity College (B.A. 1976, with honors), New York University (J.D. 1981, with honors), and Georgetown University Law Center (LL.M. 1983). At Georgetown, Kanter was awarded a Graduate Fellowship at the Institute for Public Representation, where she represented the plaintiffs in Clark v. Community for Creative Non-Violence, a case that was resolved by the United States Supreme Court in 1983.

== Legal career ==
Prior to joining the law faculty at Syracuse University College of Law, Kanter taught at Georgetown University Law Center and practiced public interest law at a national disability rights organization in Washington, D.C., known then as the Mental Health Law Project, and today as the Bazelon Center on Mental Health Law. At the Mental Health Law Project she was director of the community living project and litigated cases on behalf of people with mental disabilities seeking to leave institutions and live in their own homes in the community. One of those cases, City of Cleburne v. Cleburne Living Center, Inc., is legally significant because the Supreme Court struck down a zoning policy that discriminated against people with mental disabilities under the equal protection clause of the Fourteenth Amendment, using only the rational basis test.

Since joining the Syracuse law faculty, she has continued to remain involved in disability rights litigation and advocacy as a consultant to various international and domestic disability organizations and academic institutions. She is a co-founder and former Chair of the American Bar Association Commission on Homelessness, and former Commissioner of the American Bar Association Commission on Disability. From 2001 to 2006, Kanter worked with the United Nations Committee on drafting the Convention on the Rights of People with Disabilities (CRPD). Today, she continues to consult with governments and disability organizations on implementing the CRPD in more than 20 countries.

== Academic career ==
Kanter joined the tenure track faculty of Syracuse University College of Law in 1988, when she was appointed Director of Clinical Legal Education and director of the law school’s only civil clinic, the Public Interest Law Firm, which later became the Disability Rights Clinic. During her tenure as Director of Clinical Legal Education, Kanter started six new clinics, all of which continue today. She also founded and directed the Externship Program, which has been expanded to different cities. In recognition of the accomplishments of the Office of Clinical Legal Education, the College of Law received the Emil Gumbert Award for Advocacy Programs from the AALS in 1990.

Kanter also served as the Associate Dean for Academic Affairs, during which time she introduced support for students with disabilities and a first year elective course program.

In 2005, she stepped down as Director of Clinical Legal Education and Director of the Externship Program to co-direct the Center on Human Policy, Law and Disability Studies (now part of the Center on Disability and Inclusion) and to found and direct the Disability Law and Policy Program, which is now the most extensive disability law school program in the world.

Kanter teaches Disability Law, International Human Rights and Comparative Disability Law, Advanced Disability Law and Policy, Legislation and Policy, and Special Education Law, among other courses. She holds a courtesy appointment at the Syracuse University School of Education.

Kanter has been a visiting scholar at Harvard Law School (Fall 2017); Tel Aviv University Faculty of Law, as a Fulbright Scholar (2010–11); Hebrew University Faculty of Law (1994–95; 2010–11); NALSAR University, India (Spring 2010); Charles University, Czech Republic (November 1993 and June 1994); and a Graduate Teaching Fellow at Georgetown University Law Center (1981–83).

Kanter is co-founder and inaugural Chair of the Disability Law Section of the American Association of Law Schools and co-founder of the Disability Research Group of Law and Society Organization.

== Honors and awards ==
Professor Kanter was named the Lady Davis Fellow at Hebrew University Faculty of Law in 2018; Fulbright Scholar at Tel Aviv University in 2009-10; and the 2010 Distinguished Switzer Fellow of the US Department of Education’s National Disability Rehabilitation Research Institute. Professor Kanter has been honored with awards from the Association of American Law Schools, American Bar Association, the New York State Bar Association, the Association of Higher Education and Disability, the Syracuse International Center, and the Israeli Human Rights Center for People with Disabilities. In 2020, the Disability Law and Policy Program was named one of the most innovative higher educational programs in the world by the Zero Project of the Essl Foundation.

== Publications ==
Kanter is founder and editor of the SSRN eJournal on Disability Law and co-editor of the Critical Disability Series at Syracuse University Press. She publishes and lectures extensively on US and international disability law and policy. She is the author of more than 100 book chapters and articles, as well as the following books:

- The Development of Disability Rights Under International Law: From Charity to Human Rights (Routledge, 2015, paper 2017). ISBN 9781138094338
- Righting Educational Wrongs: Disability Studies in Law and Education (with Beth Ferri, eds.,) (SU Press, 2013). ISBN 0815652356
- International Human Rights and Comparative Mental Disability Law: Cases and Materials and Documents Supplement (with Michael Perlin, Mary Pat Treuthart, Kris Gledhill & Eva Szeli, eds.,) (Carolina Academic Press, 2006). ISBN 978-1-59460-210-8

For a complete list of her publications, see her Syracuse University Profile.

== Personal life ==
Kanter lives in Massachusetts with her husband, Steven Kepnes, a former professor at Colgate University. They have two adult children.
