= Alexander Kantorov =

Russian conductor

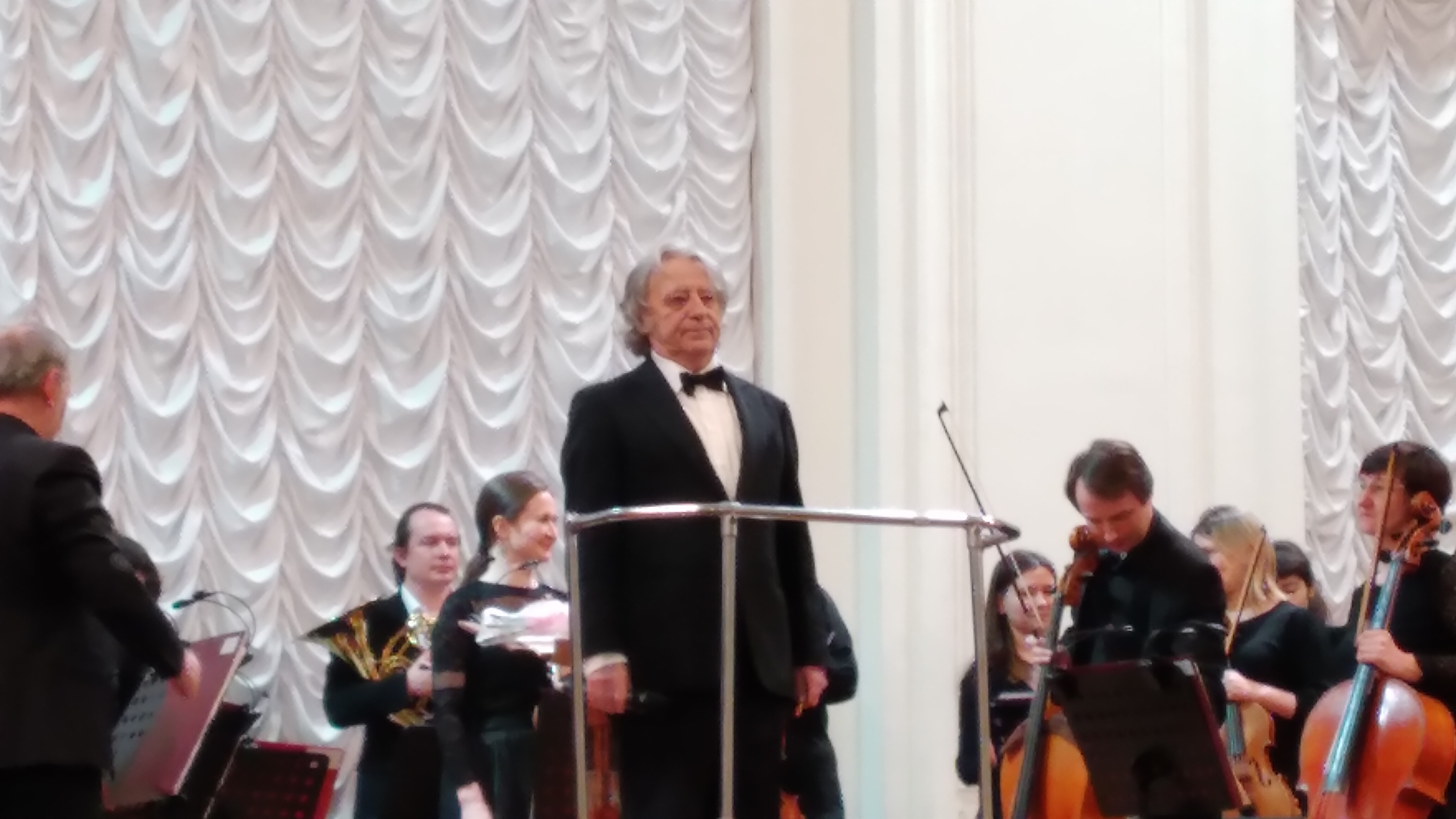
Kantorov A. Ya. - Russian conductor, violinist and music teacher; artistic director and chief conductor of "Classics» - the St. Petersburg State Symphony Orchestra

Alexander Kantorov (Russian: Алекса́ндр Я́ковлевич Ка́нторов; born 1947) is a Russian conductor who was born in Leningrad (now Saint Petersburg) and was a graduate of both Moscow and Saint Petersburg Conservatories.

He began his conducting career at the Sverdlovsk Philharmonic Symphony Orchestra and then became both a founder and head conductor of both Sverdlovsk and Saint Petersburg Symphony Orchestras. Currently he conducts numerous works by such famous Russian composers as Nikolai Rimsky-Korsakov, Sergei Prokofiev, Sergei Rachmaninoff, Dmitri Shostakovich, Alexander Taneyev, Pyotr Ilyich Tchaikovsky, as well as German composers such as Ludwig van Beethoven, Johannes Brahms, Wolfgang Amadeus Mozart, Julian Cochran from Australia and Gustav Mahler with Anton Bruckner from Austria. Besides those, he also conducted works of Hector Berlioz and Antonín Dvořák.
