= Dempwolff group =

Finite group

In mathematical finite group theory, the Dempwolff group is a finite group of order 319979520 = 2^{15}·3^{2}·5·7·31, that is the unique nonsplit extension $2^{5\,.}\mathrm{GL}_{5}(\mathbb{F}_{2})$ of $\mathrm{GL}_{5}(\mathbb{F}_{2})$ by its natural module of order $2^5$. The uniqueness of such a nonsplit extension was shown by Dempwolff (1972), and the existence by Thompson (1976), who showed using some computer calculations of Smith (1976) that the Dempwolff group is contained in the compact Lie group $E_{8}$ as the subgroup fixing a certain lattice in the Lie algebra of $E_{8}$, and is also contained in the Thompson sporadic group (the full automorphism group of this lattice) as a maximal subgroup.

Huppert (1967, p.124) showed that any extension of $\mathrm{GL}_{n}(\mathbb{F}_{q})$ by its natural module $\mathbb{F}_{q}^{n}$ splits if $q>2$. Note that this theorem does not necessarily apply to extensions of $\mathrm{SL}_{n}(\mathbb{F}_{q})$; for example, there is a non-split extension $5^{3\,.}\mathrm{SL}_{3}(\mathbb{F}_{5})$, which is a maximal subgroup of the Lyons group. Dempwolff (1973) showed that it also splits if $n$ is not 3, 4, or 5, and in each of these three cases there is just one non-split extension. These three nonsplit extensions can be constructed as follows:

- The nonsplit extension $2^{3\,.}\mathrm{GL}_{3}(\mathbb{F}_{2})$ is a maximal subgroup of the Chevalley group $G_{2}(\mathbb{F}_{3})$.
- The nonsplit extension $2^{4\,.}\mathrm{GL}_{4}(\mathbb{F}_{2})$ is a maximal subgroup of the sporadic Conway group Co_{3}.
- The nonsplit extension $2^{5\,.}\mathrm{GL}_{5}(\mathbb{F}_{2})$ is a maximal subgroup of the Thompson sporadic group Th.
