= Jerome Davis (bull rider) =

American bull rider

- Born: August 10, 1972 (age 54); Colorado Springs, Colorado, United States
- Education: Odessa Junior College
- Occupations: Professional bull rider, stock contractor
- Years active: 1989-1998
- Spouse: Tiffany Davis

Jerome Carson Davis (born August 10, 1972) is an American former professional rodeo cowboy who specialized in bull riding. He competed in the Professional Rodeo Cowboys Association (PRCA), in which he won the 1995 PRCA bull riding world championship. He also competed in the Bull Riders Only (BRO) and Professional Bull Riders (PBR) circuits; the latter of which he was one of the founding members. He was also the founder of the semi-professional Southern Extreme Bull Riding Association (SEBRA). Since 2022, he has been the head coach of the Carolina Cowboys in the PBR Team Series. In 2025, the Cowboys won the PBR Team Series Championship title.

In 2023, Davis was ranked No. 8 on the list of the top 30 bull riders in PBR history.

== Early life ==
Jerome Davis, nicknamed "Jethro", was born in Colorado Springs, Colorado. His father, Carson Davis, was stationed there while serving in the U.S. military.

Six months after his birth, Jerome moved back with his family to the Davis Family Ranch in Archdale, North Carolina, where he grew up and has lived his entire life.

When asked as a young child what he wanted to become when he grew up, he always responded, "I want to be a bull rider".

== Career ==
Davis got on his first bull at the age of eleven. He won his first bull riding buckle as a freshman in high school. He was also a calf roper and team roper during his high school days. He competed at the 1989 National High School Finals Rodeo (NHSFR) in Pueblo, Colorado, and was the 1990 North Carolina State High School Bull Riding Champion.

Davis attended Odessa Junior College in Odessa, Texas. In 1992, he won the National Intercollegiate Rodeo Association (NIRA) bull riding title at the College National Finals Rodeo (CNFR) in Bozeman, Montana. That same year, he turned pro and joined the Professional Rodeo Cowboys Association (PRCA). He was also one of the 21 co-founders of the Professional Bull Riders (PBR) that year.

In 1993, Davis also began competing in the Bull Riders Only (BRO) circuit. That same year, he was cast as a stunt double in the film 8 Seconds, about the life of PRCA world champion bull rider Lane Frost. Davis qualified for his first National Finals Rodeo (NFR) that year.

In 1994, Davis founded the Southern Extreme Bull Riding Association (SEBRA), which would become one of the top semi-professional bull riding organizations in the United States for contestants trying to work their way up to the professional level.

Davis would qualify for the NFR five times in his career, from 1993 through 1997. In 1995 at the NFR, he won the PRCA bull riding world championship, having won the most money of any bull rider in the PRCA that year. He also won the NFR bull riding average title.

Davis also qualified for the PBR World Finals from 1994 through 1997.

He was having a very successful early 1998 season in the PBR, until tragedy struck. On March 14 of that year at the Tuff Hedeman Championship Challenge, the annual Bud Light Cup event in Fort Worth, Texas, Davis drew the bull named Knock 'em Out John during the first round. Five seconds into the ride, the bull made a big lunge forward and Davis was jerked down, causing his head to collide with the bull's head and knocking Davis out. The unconscious Davis was then thrown off the bull's back and landed head-first into the arena dirt, causing a fracture/dislocation at the base of his neck. The wreck resulted in Davis becoming permanently paralyzed from the chest down. He was first in the PBR world standings at the time of the incident. The money he had won during the season up to that point would have been enough to qualify him to compete at his fifth consecutive PBR World Finals.

Davis now moves about in a wheelchair.

=== Career highlights ===
- 1990 North Carolina State High School Rodeo Champion bull rider
- 1992 National Intercollegiate Rodeo Association (NIRA) Champion bull rider
- Two-time champion of the George Paul Memorial Bull Riding (1993, 1996)
- Two-time Bull Riders Only (BRO) Finals qualifier (1993-1994)
- Two-time Professional Rodeo Cowboys Association (PRCA) Southeastern Circuit Champion bull rider (1994, 1996)
- Five-time National Finals Rodeo (NFR) qualifier (1993-1997)
- Four-time Professional Bull Riders (PBR) World Finals qualifier (1994-1997)
- 1995 PRCA World Champion bull rider
- 1995 NFR Bull Riding Average champion

== Personal life ==
Davis and his fiancée Tiffany Brady were scheduled to be married in May of 1998. However, as a result of Davis' injury, the wedding was postponed and they were eventually married on October 17, 1998.

== Post-career ==
Since the end of his bull riding career, Davis and his wife Tiffany have raised bucking bulls on the Davis Rodeo Ranch in Archdale, North Carolina, and haul them to several PBR events each year. They also put on several events at the Davis Rodeo Ranch Arena every year, including the PBR-sanctioned Jerome Davis Invitational, which has been held yearly since 1999. It did not take place in 2020 due to the COVID-19 pandemic, but returned in 2021.

In 2022, Davis became the head coach of the Carolina Cowboys; one of eight founding teams in the PBR Team Series, which debuted that year and runs from the summer to autumn. It concludes with the Team Series Championship at T-Mobile Arena in Las Vegas, Nevada. Tiffany is the team's assistant general manager. The Cowboys won the fifth event of the 2022 PBR Team Series season at Gambler Days in Austin, Texas; the hometown event of rival team, the Austin Gamblers. The Cowboys were eliminated after the second day of the inaugural Team Series Championship.

In 2023, the Carolina Cowboys were eliminated after the first day of the Team Series Championship.

In 2024, the Carolina Cowboys finished in second place during the Team Series regular season. As a result, both them and regular-season champions, the Kansas City Outlaws, received a first-round bye and automatically qualified for the second day of the Team Series Championship. At the Team Series Championship, the Cowboys succeeded in making it to the final round against the Austin Gamblers. The Gamblers ended up defeating the Cowboys to win the 2024 PBR Team Series Championship title.

In April 2025, the Carolina Cowboys defeated the Nashville Stampede to win the PBR Monster Energy Team Challenge presented by Camping World at the Unleash the Beast Series (UTB) event in Sioux Falls, South Dakota.

At the 2025 Team Series Championship, the Carolina Cowboys succeeded in making it to the final round for the second season in a row, only now against the Missouri Thunder. The Cowboys defeated the Thunder to win the 2025 PBR Team Series Championship title.

In March 2026, the Carolina Cowboys defeated the Nashville Stampede to win the Monster Energy Team Challenge at the UTB event in Indianapolis, Indiana.

The Carolina Cowboys finished fourth during the 2026 Team Series regular season. On the first day of the Team Series Championship, they defeated the New York Mavericks to move on to the second day of competition. On the second day, the Cowboys were defeated by the Nashville Stampede, but came back to the Last Chance Game, where the Texas Rattlers eliminated both the Cowboys and Missouri Thunder.

== Honors ==
In 1998, Davis was inducted into the PBR Ring of Honor.

In 2018, he was inducted into the Bull Riding Hall of Fame.

In 2023, he was ranked No. 8 on the list of the top 30 bull riders in PBR history.

He was honored as Coach of the Year for the PBR Teams Series in 2025.

In 2026, he was inducted into the ProRodeo Hall of Fame.
