= Isaiah Kantor =

Russian mathematician (1936–2006)

Isaiah Kantor (or Issai Kantor, or Isai Lʹvovich Kantor) (1936–2006) was a mathematician who introduced the Kantor–Koecher–Tits construction, and the Kantor double, a Jordan superalgebra constructed from a Poisson algebra.
