= Richard W. Konter =

- Born: 1882
- Died: 1979 (aged 96–97); Fort Hamilton, Brooklyn
- Occupation: Chief Radioman in the U.S. Navy
- Known for: Accompanying Byrd Arctic and Antarctic Expeditions

Richard Wesley Konter (1882–1979) was a Chief Radioman in the U.S. Navy, a member of the Byrd Arctic and Antarctic Expeditions, and a prominent musician.

== Explorer ==
Konter joined the Navy in 1897 at the age of 15 on the day his mother died. He was a veteran of the Spanish‐American War. He worked his way up to Chief Radioman in the US Navy and retired after twenty-nine years in the service. Konter had sailed around the world as a member of the Great White Fleet and had survived typhoons and the Boxer Rebellion. Tattooed in China, "Konter wrote (in his own hand) that he had a cockfight inked on his left forearm, while on his right forearm he had a dragon and a butterfly (Konter, questionnaire for Permanent Records of the Byrd Arctic Expedition, Byrd Polar Archives)."

Konter was a member of Richard E. Byrd's expedition to the Arctic in 1926 and then during 1928-30 to Antarctica. His knowledge of seamanship was his main value to Byrd, but his musical talent was also an asset to the Arctic expedition. While he was not chosen to winter over on the Antarctic Continent (a shattering event for him) his knowledge of wooden ships was paramount to Byrd for the safe return of the expedition's vessel to New Zealand. There, he served as a key member of the expedition's liaison team. The Konter Cliffs in Antarctica were named after him.

He sent out hundreds of Christmas Cards from Antarctica to his correspondents, many not arriving until over a year later.

== Musical career ==
While snowed in during the winter of 1900-1901 in Manchuria, Konter learned how to play the guitar. It is believed that he learned to play the ukulele while in Hawaii in either 1898 or in 1908 during his naval service. Later, while living in Brooklyn, he taught children to play the ukulele. "Dick's Ukulele Club" was in high demand; the group was heard regularly on early radio broadcasts and at events in and around New York City. Konter also published "Dick's Ukulele Method." Notably, he became the go-to ukulele arranger for the sheet music publishers of Tin Pan Alley. Many famous songs included his tabs, including "Down on the Farm," "Yes, We Have No Bananas," and "If You Knew Susie."

Konter played many stringed instruments (as well as many others). He brought two Martin ukuleles, a mandolin, and several harmonicas aboard the SS Chantier for the 1926 Arctic Expedition with Byrd. The ukulele exploded in popularity in the U.S. in 1915 and was all the rage after the 1915 Panama-Pacific International Exposition in San Francisco. Konter planned to introduce the instrument to the "Eskimos," unaware that there were no Inuit living in Svalbard. His cheerful disposition and musical ability made him the life of the party.

Konter, with the help of pilot Floyd Bennett, smuggled a Martin model 1K ukulele with a Hohner Chromonica brand Harmonica tied to the ukulele's neck into a stack of furs in the airplane that made the first flight over the North Pole on May 9, 1926. Upon their safe return, Konter had many of the participants sign the instrument and added many additional signatures to it over the years. It is on permanent display in the C. F. Martin Museum after he traded the ukulele for a Martin Guitar. Archaeologist Larry Bartram and Dick Boak of Martin are working to identify the signatures. They have published the results in A Stowaway Ukulele Revealed: Richard Konter & The Byrd Polar Expeditions. Over 155 signatures are on the instrument, including President Calvin Coolidge, Charles Lindbergh and Thomas Edison. C.F. Martin has produced a limited number of replicas of the signed ukulele.

Konter brought Favilla brand ukuleles on the Antarctic Expeditions, with one flown over the South Pole. A signed instrument was given to the Favilla Company for their museum.

From about 1930 to 1970, he led a band and a group of entertainers that performed in the New York area at children's shelters and hospitals for the chronically ill and at homes for the aged.

He also filed for a patent on an improved version of the Autoharp US 2401571 A which was accepted in 1946 and expired in 1963.

== Recognition ==
- Honorary Member of the Radio Club of America - 1970
- The Edgar F. Johnson Pioneer Citation, Radio Club of America - 1975

== Personal life ==
He died at the Veterans Administration Hospital in Fort Hamilton, Brooklyn at age 97. He was a life-long resident of Brooklyn.

Konter first proposed to Johanna Cohen during or soon after 1926. They had met as musical performers and later she was a member of "Dick's Ukulele Club." Her father refused to allow the marriage due to the difference in their ages (25 years). Not long after, she married Konter's shipmate, Bill Pool (15 years difference). They had a daughter, Jean, and a son. Bill Pool died in 1953. Johanna and Dick married in 1962, he for the first time at 80 years of age.

== Publications ==
- Dick's Ukulele Method, 1923, Edward B Marks Music Co., New York
- Dick's Improved Ukulele Method, 1924, Edward B Marks Music Co., New York
- Dick's Ukulele System, 1926, Edward B Marks Music Co., New York
- Shipmates Ahoy, 1963, A Geneva Book, ASIN: B000RF2J2A
