= Cantor (surname) =

Cantor is an English surname. One possible derivation is from the Middle English word gaunter, 'glover'. Alternatively, it may derive from cantere, 'one who sings', possibly related to the Latin base of cant or both sharing a Proto-Indo-European root with *kan-, both meaning 'song' or 'to sing'. It may also refer to the Anglo-Norman chantour or the Old French chantroir meaning 'enchanter' or 'magician' or cantor meaning 'leader of a choir', possibly also from the Latin precentor. Cantor is also the direct translation for singer in the Welsh language.

Notable people with the surname include:

- Andrés Cantor (born 1962), Spanish-language soccer announcer
- Arthur Cantor (1920–2001), American theatrical producer
- Aviva Cantor (born 1940), American journalist, lecturer and author
- B. Gerald Cantor (1916–1996), American businessman
  - Cantor Fitzgerald, financial services firm founded by him
- Brett Cantor (1967–1993), American record executive and nightclub owner
- Brian Cantor (born 1948), Vice-Chancellor of the University of York, UK
- Charles Cantor (born 1942), American molecular geneticist
- David Cantor (born 1954), American actor and singer
- Eddie Cantor (1892–1964), American comedian, singer, actor, songwriter
- Eric Cantor (born 1963), American politician
- Geoffrey Cantor (academic) (born 1943), professor of history and philosophy of science at the University of Leeds
- Georg Cantor (1845–1918), German mathematician, founder of set theory
- Iris Cantor (1931–2026), American philanthropist
- Jacob A. Cantor (1854–1921), New York politician
- James Cantor (born 1966), American-Canadian clinical psychologist specializing in sexology
- Jay Cantor (born 1948), American novelist and essayist
- Leo Cantor (1919–1995), American NFL football player
- Liz Cantor (born 1982), Australian television presenter
- Max Cantor (1959–1991), American journalist and actor
- Mircea Cantor (born 1977), Romanian visual artist
- Moritz Cantor (1829–1920), German historian of mathematics
- Nancy Cantor (born 1952), Chancellor and President of Syracuse University
- Noah Cantor (born 1971), Canadian football player
- Norman Cantor (1929–2004), Canadian medievalist
- Peter Cantor (died 1197), French Roman Catholic theologian
- Paul Cantor (1945–2022), American literary critic
- Paul Cantor (Canadian lawyer) (1942–2018), Canadian lawyer
- Rob Cantor (born 1983), American singer-songwriter
- Steven Cantor, American film/television director
- Theodore Edward Cantor (1809–1860), Danish biologist
- Tim Cantor (born 1969), American surrealism artist and writer
- Wulfstan the Cantor (c.960 – early 11th century), Anglo-Saxon monk

== See also ==
- The dictionary definition of cantor at Wiktionary
- Cant (surname)
- Canter (surname)
- Cantor
- Kantor (surname)
- Vera Cantor, Marvel Comics character
