= Kantor–Koecher–Tits construction =

In algebra, the Kantor–Koecher–Tits construction is a method of constructing a Lie algebra from a Jordan algebra, introduced by Jacques Tits (1962), Kantor (1964), and Koecher (1967).

If J is a Jordan algebra, the Kantor–Koecher–Tits construction puts a Lie algebra structure on J + J + Inner(J), the sum of 2 copies of J and the Lie algebra of inner derivations of J.

When applied to a 27-dimensional exceptional Jordan algebra it gives a Lie algebra of type E_{7} of dimension 133.

The Kantor–Koecher–Tits construction was used by Kac (1977) to classify the finite-dimensional simple Jordan superalgebras.
