= Jordan frame =

Jordan frame may refer to:

- Jordan and Einstein frames, arising in the theory of relativity
- Jordan frame (Jordan algebra), complete sets of pairwise orthogonal minimal idempotents in a Jordan algebra
- A specific type of spinal board used in Australia
