= Maass–Selberg relations =

Eisenstein series relations

In mathematics, the Maass–Selberg relations are some relations describing the inner products of truncated real analytic Eisenstein series, that in some sense say that distinct Eisenstein series are orthogonal. Hans Maass introduced the Maass–Selberg relations for the case of real analytic Eisenstein series on the upper half plane. Atle Selberg extended the relations to symmetric spaces of rank 1. Harish-Chandra generalized the Maass–Selberg relations to Eisenstein series of higher rank semisimple group (and named the relations after Maass and Selberg) and found some analogous relations between Eisenstein integrals, that he also called Maass–Selberg relations.

Informally, the Maass–Selberg relations say that the inner product of two distinct Eisenstein series is zero. However the integral defining the inner product does not converge, so the Eisenstein series first have to be truncated. The Maass–Selberg relations then say that the inner product of two truncated Eisenstein series is given by a finite sum of elementary factors that depend on the truncation chosen, whose finite part tends to zero as the truncation is removed.
