= JBW (disambiguation) =

JBW may refer to:

- JBW, a British racing car manufacturer
- JBW algebra, a type of algebra over a field
- Johnson Boat Works, an American racing boat manufacturer
- jbw, the ISO 639-3 language code for the Yawijibaya language
