= Losev =

Losev is a common Russian surname, derived from the word (лось, en: "elk" or "moose"). It may refer to:.

- A. Losev, 19th century Army General of the Russian Empire
- Aleksei Losev, philosopher
- Igor Losev, Russian football player (FK Rīga)
- Ivan Losev (racewalker) (b. 1986), Ukrainian racewalker
- Ivan Losev (mathematician) (b. 1981), Belarusian-American mathematician
- Lev Vladimirovich Losev, Russian poet and essayist
- Oleg Vladimirovich Losev, one of the first researchers of LED
- Sergei Losev (b. 1983), Russian football player
- Sergei Losev (scientist), co-author of the MacBride report
- Valeri Losev, Soviet volleyball player in the 1980s
- Viktor Losev, Soviet football player in the 1980s
- Yevgeni Losev (b. 1979), Russian football player
