= Ivan Losev =

Ivan Losev may refer to:

- Ivan Losev (racewalker)
- Ivan Losev (mathematician)
