= Vinberg's algorithm =

In mathematics, Vinberg's algorithm is an algorithm, introduced by Ernest Borisovich Vinberg, for finding a fundamental domain of a hyperbolic reflection group.

Conway (1983) used Vinberg's algorithm to describe the automorphism group of the 26-dimensional even unimodular Lorentzian lattice II_{25,1} in terms of the Leech lattice.

== Description of the algorithm ==
Let $\Gamma < \mathrm{Isom}(\mathbb{H}^n)$ be a hyperbolic reflection group. Choose any point $v_0 \in \mathbb{H}^n$; we shall call it the basic (or initial) point. The fundamental domain $P_0$ of its stabilizer $\Gamma_{v_0}$ is a polyhedral cone in $\mathbb{H}^n$. Let $H_1,...,H_m$ be the faces of this cone, and let $a_1,...,a_m$ be outer normal vectors to it. Consider the half-spaces $H_k^- = \{x \in \R^{n,1} |(x,a_k) \le 0\}.$

There exists a unique fundamental polyhedron $P$ of $\Gamma$ contained in $P_0$ and containing the point $v_0$. Its faces containing $v_0$ are formed by faces $H_1,...,H_m$ of the cone $P_0$. The other faces $H_{m+1},...$ and the corresponding outward normals $a_{m+1}, ...$ are constructed by induction. Namely, for $H_j$ we take a mirror such that the root $a_j$ orthogonal to it satisfies the conditions

(1) $(v_0,a_j) < 0$;

(2) $(a_i, a_j ) \le 0$ for all $i < j$;

(3) the distance $(v_0 , H_j)$ is minimum subject to constraints (1) and (2).
