= Symmetric cone =

Open convex self-dual cones

In mathematics, symmetric cones, sometimes called domains of positivity, are open convex self-dual cones in Euclidean space which have a transitive group of symmetries, i.e. invertible operators that take the cone onto itself. By the Koecher–Vinberg theorem these correspond to the cone of squares in finite-dimensional real Euclidean Jordan algebras, originally studied and classified by Jordan, von Neumann & Wigner (1934). The tube domain associated with a symmetric cone is a noncompact Hermitian symmetric space of tube type. All the algebraic and geometric structures associated with the symmetric space can be expressed naturally in terms of the Jordan algebra. The other irreducible Hermitian symmetric spaces of noncompact type correspond to Siegel domains of the second kind. These can be described in terms of more complicated structures called Jordan triple systems, which generalize Jordan algebras without identity.

== Definitions ==
A convex cone C in a finite-dimensional real inner product space V is a convex set invariant under multiplication by positive scalars. It spans the subspace C – C and the largest subspace it contains is C ∩ (−C). It spans the whole space if and only if it contains a basis. Since the convex hull of the basis is a polytope with non-empty interior, this happens if and only if C has non-empty interior. The interior in this case is also a convex cone. Moreover, an open convex cone coincides with the interior of its closure, since any interior point in the closure must lie in the interior of some polytope in the original cone. A convex cone is said to be proper if its closure, also a cone, contains no subspaces.

Let C be an open convex cone. Its dual is defined as

$$\displaystyle{C^*=\{X: (X,Y) > 0\,\,\mathrm{for}\,\,Y \in \overline{C}\}.}$$

It is also an open convex cone and C** = C. An open convex cone C is said to be self-dual if C* = C. It is necessarily proper, since it does not contain 0, so cannot contain both X and −X.

The automorphism group of an open convex cone is defined by

$$\displaystyle{\mathrm{Aut}\,C =\{g\in \mathrm{GL}(V)| gC=C\}.}$$

Clearly g lies in Aut C if and only if g takes the closure of C onto itself. So Aut C is a closed subgroup of GL(V) and hence a Lie group. Moreover, Aut C* = (Aut C)*, where g* is the adjoint of g. C is said to be homogeneous if Aut C acts transitively on C.

The open convex cone C is called a symmetric cone if it is self-dual and homogeneous.

== Group theoretic properties ==
- If C is a symmetric cone, then Aut C is closed under taking adjoints.
- The identity component Aut_{0} C acts transitively on C.
- The stabilizers of points are maximal compact subgroups, all conjugate, and exhaust the maximal compact subgroups of Aut C.
- In Aut_{0} C the stabilizers of points are maximal compact subgroups, all conjugate, and exhaust the maximal compact subgroups of Aut_{0} C.
- The maximal compact subgroups of Aut_{0} C are connected.
- The component group of Aut C is isomorphic to the component group of a maximal compact subgroup and therefore finite.
- Aut C ∩ O(V) and Aut_{0} C ∩ O(V) are maximal compact subgroups in Aut C and Aut_{0} C.
- C is naturally a Riemannian symmetric space isomorphic to G / K where G = Aut_{0} C. The Cartan involution is defined by σ(g)=(g*)^{−1}, so that K = G ∩ O(V).

== Spectral decomposition in a Euclidean Jordan algebra ==
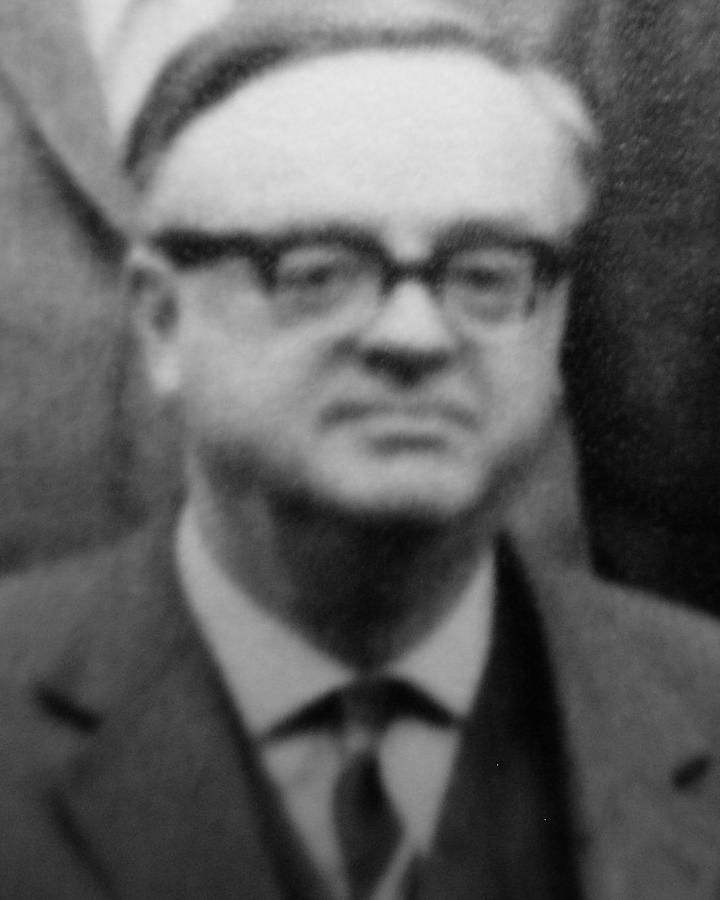
Pascual Jordan

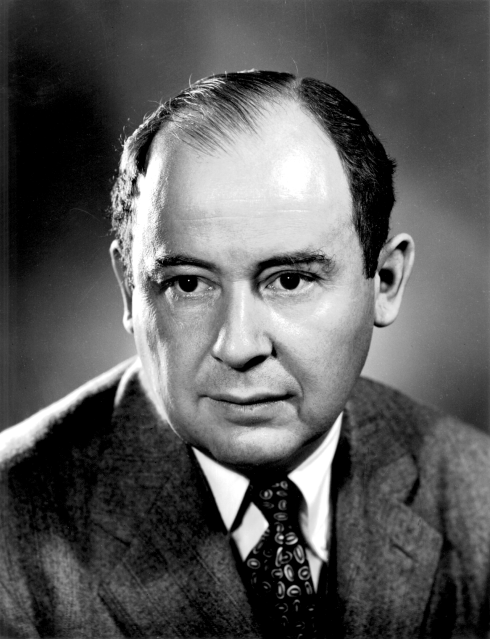
John von Neumann

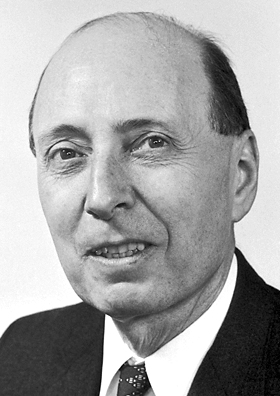
Eugene Wigner

In their classic paper, Jordan, von Neumann & Wigner (1934) studied and completely classified a class of finite-dimensional Jordan algebras, that are now called either Euclidean Jordan algebras or formally real Jordan algebras.

=== Definition ===
Let E be a finite-dimensional real vector space with a symmetric bilinear product operation

$$\displaystyle{E\times E \rightarrow E,\,\,\, a,b\mapsto ab =ba,}$$

with an identity element 1 such that a1 = a for a in A and a real inner product (a,b) for which the multiplication operators L(a) defined by L(a)b = ab on E are self-adjoint and satisfy the Jordan relation

$$\displaystyle{L(a)L(a^2)=L(a^2)L(a).}$$

As will turn out below, the condition on adjoints can be replaced by the equivalent condition that the trace form Tr L(ab) defines an inner product. The trace form has the advantage of being manifestly invariant under automorphisms of the Jordan algebra, which is thus a closed subgroup of O(E) and thus a compact Lie group. In practical examples, however, it is often easier to produce an inner product for which the L(a) are self-adjoint than verify directly positive-definiteness of the trace form. (The equivalent original condition of Jordan, von Neumann and Wigner was that if a sum of squares of elements vanishes then each of those elements has to vanish.)

=== Power associativity ===
From the Jordan condition it follows that the Jordan algebra is power associative, i.e. the Jordan subalgebra generated by any single element a in E is actually an associative commutative algebra. Thus, defining a^{n} inductively by a^{n} = a (a^{n−1}), the following associativity relation holds:

$$\displaystyle{a^m a^n = a^{m+n},}$$

so the subalgebra can be identified with R[a], polynomials in a. In fact polarizing of the Jordan relation—replacing a by a + tb and taking the coefficient of t—yields

$$\displaystyle{2L(ab)L(a) + L(a^2)L(b)=2L(a)L(b)L(a) + L(a^2b).}$$

This identity implies that L(a^{m}) is a polynomial in L(a) and L(a^{2}) for all m. In fact, assuming the result for lower exponents than m,

$$\displaystyle{a^2 a^{m-1} =a^{m-1}(a^2)=L(a^{m-1})L(a)a=L(a)L(a^{m-1})a=L(a)a^m=a^{m+1}.}$$

Setting b = a^{m – 1} in the polarized Jordan identity gives:

$$\displaystyle{L(a^{m+1})=2L(a^m)L(a)+L(a^2)L(a^{m-1})-2L(a)^2L(a^{m-1}),}$$

a recurrence relation showing inductively that L(a^{m + 1}) is a polynomial in L(a) and L(a^{2}).

Consequently, if power-associativity holds when the first exponent is ≤ m, then it also holds for m+1 since

$$\displaystyle{L(a^{m+1})a^n=2L(a)L(a^m)a^n+ L(a^2)L(a^{m-1})a^n -2L(a)^2L(a^{m-1})a^n
=a^{m+n+1}.}$$

=== Idempotents and rank ===
An element e in E is called an idempotent if e^{2} = e. Two idempotents are said to be orthogonal if ef = 0. This is equivalent to orthogonality with respect to the inner product, since (ef,ef) = (e,f). In this case g = e + f is also an idempotent. An idempotent g is called primitive or minimal if it cannot be written as a sum of non-zero orthogonal idempotents. If e_{1}, ..., e_{m} are pairwise orthogonal idempotents then their sum is also an idempotent and the algebra they generate consists of all linear combinations of the e_{i}. It is an associative algebra. If e is an idempotent, then 1 − e is an orthogonal idempotent. An orthogonal set of idempotents with sum 1 is said to be a complete set or a partition of 1. If each idempotent in the set is minimal it is called a Jordan frame. Since the number of elements in any orthogonal set of idempotents is bounded by dim E, Jordan frames exist. The maximal number of elements in a Jordan frame is called the rank r of E.

=== Spectral decomposition ===
The spectral theorem states that any element a can be uniquely written as

$$\displaystyle{a=\sum \lambda_i e_i,}$$

where the idempotents e_{i}'s are a partition of 1 and the λ_{i}, the eigenvalues of a, are real and distinct. In fact let E_{0} = R[a] and let T be the restriction of L(a) to E_{0}. T is self-adjoint and has 1 as a cyclic vector. So the commutant of T consists of polynomials in T (or a). By the spectral theorem for self-adjoint operators,

$$\displaystyle{T=\sum \lambda_i P_i}$$

where the P_{i} are orthogonal projections on E_{0} with sum I and the λ_{i}'s are the distinct real eigenvalues of T. Since the P_{i}'s commute with T and are self-adjoint, they are given by multiplication elements e_{i} of R[a] and thus form a partition of 1. Uniqueness follows because if f_{i} is a partition of 1 and a = Σ μ_{i} f_{i}, then with p(t)=Π (t - μ_{j}) and p_{i} = p/(t − μ_{i}), f_{i} = p_{i}(a)/p_{i}(μ_{i}). So the f_{i}'s are polynomials in a and uniqueness follows from uniqueness of the spectral decomposition of T.

The spectral theorem implies that the rank is independent of the Jordan frame. For a Jordan frame with k minimal idempotents can be used to construct an element a with k distinct eigenvalues. As above the minimal polynomial p of a has degree k and R[a] has dimension k. Its dimension is also the largest k such that F_{k}(a) ≠ 0 where F_{k}(a) is the determinant of a Gram matrix:

$$\displaystyle{F_k(a)=\det_{0\le m,n< k} (a^m,a^n).}$$

So the rank r is the largest integer k for which F_{k} is not identically zero on E. In this case, as a non-vanishing polynomial, F_{r} is non-zero on an open dense subset of E. the regular elements. Any other a is a limit of regular elements a^{(n)}. Since the operator norm of L(x) gives an equivalent norm on E, a standard compactness argument shows that, passing to a subsequence if necessary, the spectral idempotents of the a^{(n)} and their corresponding eigenvalues are convergent. The limit of Jordan frames is a Jordan frame, since a limit of non-zero idempotents yields a non-zero idempotent by continuity of the operator norm. It follows that every Jordan frame is made up of r minimal idempotents.

If e and f are orthogonal idempotents, the spectral theorem shows that e and f are polynomials in a = e − f, so that L(e) and L(f) commute. This can be seen directly from the polarized Jordan identity which implies L(e)L(f) = 2 L(e)L(f)L(e). Commutativity follows by taking adjoints.

=== Spectral decomposition for an idempotent ===
If e is a non-zero idempotent then the eigenvalues of L(e) can only be 0, 1/2 and 1, since taking a = b = e in the polarized Jordan identity yields

$$\displaystyle{2L(e)^3-3L(e)^2 +L(e)=0.}$$

In particular the operator norm of L(e) is 1 and its trace is strictly positive.

There is a corresponding orthogonal eigenspace decomposition of E

$$\displaystyle{E=E_0(e)\oplus E_{1/2}(e) \oplus E_1(e),}$$

where, for a in E, E_{λ}(a) denotes the λ-eigenspace of L(a). In this decomposition E_{1}(e) and E_{0}(e) are Jordan algebras with identity elements e and 1 − e. Their sum E_{1}(e) ⊕ E_{0}(e) is a direct sum of Jordan algebras in that any product between them is zero. It is the centralizer subalgebra of e and consists of all a such that L(a) commutes with L(e). The subspace E_{1/2}(e) is a module for the centralizer of e, the centralizer module, and the product of any two elements in it lies in the centralizer subalgebra. On the other hand, if

$$\displaystyle{U=8L(e)^2 -8L(e) +I,}$$

then U is self-adjoint equal to 1 on the centralizer algebra and −1 on the centralizer module. So U^{2} = I and the properties above show that

$$\displaystyle{\sigma(x) = Ux}$$

defines an involutive Jordan algebra automorphism σ of E.

In fact the Jordan algebra and module properties follow by replacing a and b in the polarized Jordan identity by e and a. If ea = 0, this gives L(e)L(a) = 2L(e)L(a)L(e). Taking adjoints it follows that L(a) commutes with L(e). Similarly if (1 − e)a = 0, L(a) commutes with I − L(e) and hence L(e). This implies the Jordan algebra and module properties. To check that a product of elements in the module lies in the algebra, it is enough to check this for squares: but if L(e)a = 1/2 a, then ea = 1/2 a, so L(a)^{2} + L(a^{2})L(e) = 2L(a)L(e)L(a) + L(a^{2}e). Taking adjoints it follows that L(a^{2}) commutes with L(e), which implies the property for squares.

=== Trace form ===
The trace form is defined by
$$\displaystyle{\tau(a,b) = \mathrm{Tr}\, L(ab).}$$

It is an inner product since, for non-zero a = Σ λ_{i} e_{i},
$$\displaystyle{\tau(a,a)=\sum \lambda_i^2 \mathrm{Tr}\,L(e_i) > 0.}$$

The polarized Jordan identity can be polarized again by replacing a by a + tc and taking the coefficient of t. A further anyisymmetrization in a and c yields:

$$\displaystyle{L(a(bc) -(ab)c)=[[L(a),L(b)],L(c)].}$$

Applying the trace to both sides

$$\displaystyle{\tau(a,bc)=\tau(ba,c),}$$

so that L(b) is self-adjoint for the trace form.

== Simple Euclidean Jordan algebras ==
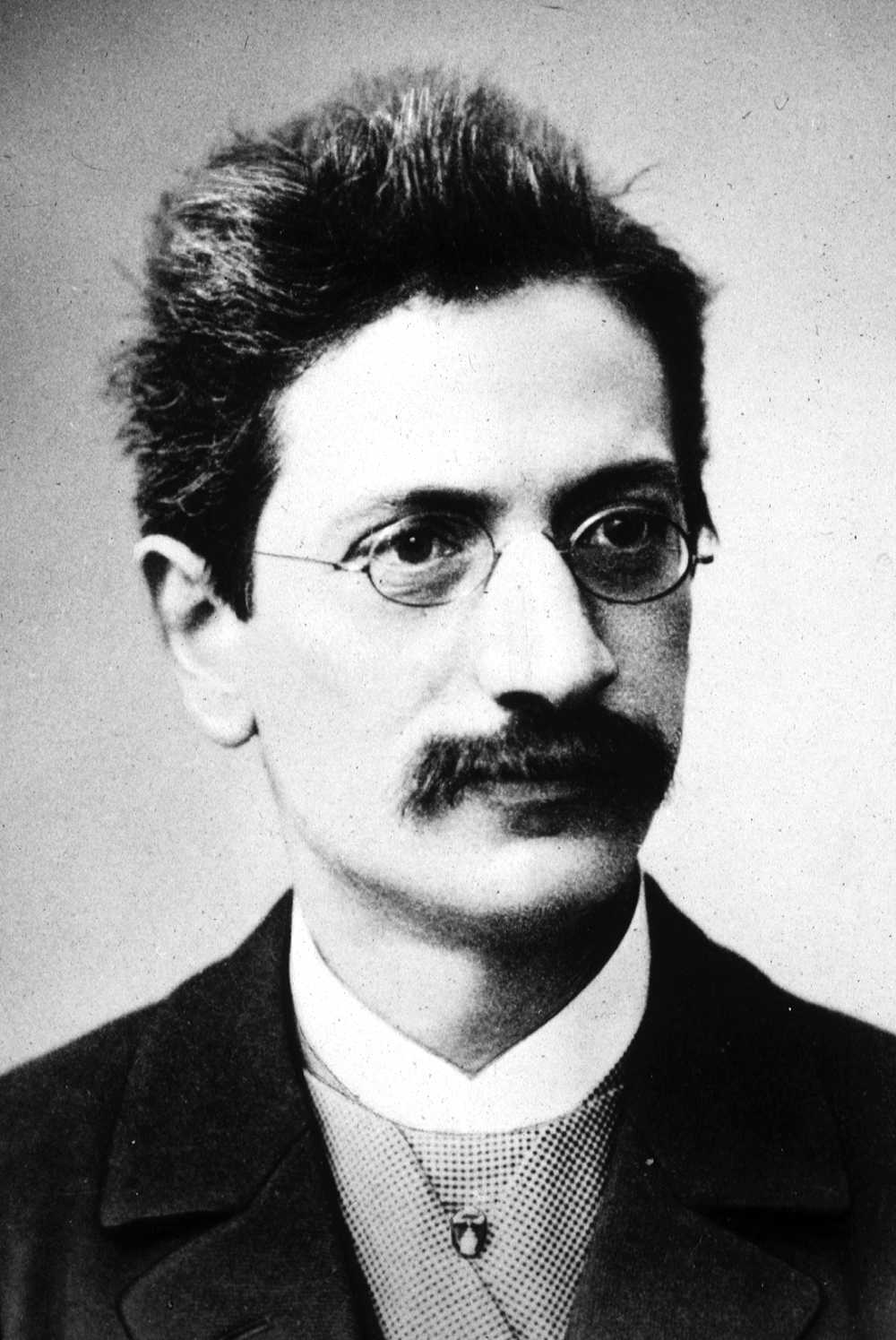
Adolf Hurwitz (1855–1919), whose work on composition algebras was published posthumously in 1923.

The classification of simple Euclidean Jordan algebras was accomplished by Jordan, von Neumann & Wigner (1934), with details of the one exceptional algebra provided in the article immediately following theirs by Albert (1934). Using the Peirce decomposition, they reduced the problem to an algebraic problem involving multiplicative quadratic forms already solved by Hurwitz. The presentation here, following Faraut & Koranyi (1994), using composition algebras or Euclidean Hurwitz algebras, is a shorter version of the original derivation.

=== Central decomposition ===
If E is a Euclidean Jordan algebra an ideal F in E is a linear subspace closed under multiplication by elements of E, i.e. F is invariant under the operators L(a) for a in E. If P is the orthogonal projection onto F it commutes with the operators L(a), In particular F^{⊥} = (I − P)E is also an ideal and E = F ⊕ F^{⊥}. Furthermore, if e = P(1), then P = L(e). In fact for a in E
$$\displaystyle{ea=ae=L(a)P(1)=P(L(a)1)=P(a),}$$
so that ea = a for a in F and 0 for a in F^{⊥}. In particular e and 1 − e are orthogonal idempotents with L(e) = P and L(1 − e) = I − P. e and 1 − e are the identities in the Euclidean Jordan algebras F and F^{⊥}. The idempotent e is central in E, where the center of E is defined to be the set of all z such that L(z) commutes with L(a) for all a. It forms a commutative associative subalgebra.

Continuing in this way E can be written as a direct sum of minimal ideals
$$\displaystyle{E=\oplus E_i.}$$

If P_{i} is the projection onto E_{i} and e_{i} = P_{i}(1) then P_{i} = L(e_{i}). The e_{i}'s are orthogonal with sum 1 and are the identities in E_{i}. Minimality forces E_{i} to be simple, i.e. to have no non-trivial ideals. For since L(e_{i}) commutes with all L(a)'s, any ideal F ⊂ E_{i} would be invariant under E since F = e_{i}F. Such a decomposition into a direct sum of simple Euclidean algebras is unique. If E = ⊕ F_{j} is another decomposition, then F_{j}=⊕ e_{i}F_{j}. By minimality only one of the terms here is non-zero so equals F_{j}. By minimality the corresponding E_{i} equals F_{j}, proving uniqueness.

In this way the classification of Euclidean Jordan algebras is reduced to that of simple ones. For a simple algebra E all inner products for which the operators L(a) are self adjoint are proportional. Indeed, any other product has the form (Ta, b) for some positive self-adjoint operator commuting with the L(a)'s. Any non-zero eigenspace of T is an ideal in A and therefore by simplicity T must act on the whole of E as a positive scalar.

=== List of all simple Euclidean Jordan algebras ===
- Let H_{n}(R) be the space of real symmetric n by n matrices with inner product (a,b) = Tr ab and Jordan product a ∘ b = 1/2(ab + ba). Then H_{n}(R) is a simple Euclidean Jordan algebra of rank n for n ≥ 3.
- Let H_{n}(C) be the space of complex self-adjoint n by n matrices with inner product (a,b) = Re Tr ab* and Jordan product a ∘ b = 1/2(ab + ba). Then H_{n}(C) is a simple Euclidean Jordan algebra of rank n for n ≥ 3.
- Let H_{n}(H) be the space of self-adjoint n by n matrices with entries in the quaternions, inner product (a,b) = Re Tr ab* and Jordan product a ∘ b = 1/2(ab + ba). Then H_{n}(H) is a simple Euclidean Jordan algebra of rank n for n ≥ 3.
- Let V be a finite dimensional real inner product space and set E = V ⊕ R with inner product (u⊕λ,v⊕μ) =(u,v) + λμ and product (u⊕λ)∘(v⊕μ)=( μu + λv) ⊕ [(u,v) + λμ]. This is a Euclidean Jordan algebra of rank 2, called a spin factor.
- The above examples in fact give all the simple Euclidean Jordan algebras, except for one exceptional case H_{3}(O), the self-adjoint matrices over the octonions or Cayley numbers, another rank 3 simple Euclidean Jordan algebra of dimension 27 (see below).

The Jordan algebras H_{2}(R), H_{2}(C), H_{2}(H) and H_{2}(O) are isomorphic to spin factors V ⊕ R where V has dimension 2, 3, 5 and 9, respectively: that is, one more than the dimension of the relevant division algebra.

=== Peirce decomposition ===
Let E be a simple Euclidean Jordan algebra with inner product given by the trace form τ(a)= Tr L(a). The proof that E has the above form rests on constructing an analogue of matrix units for a Jordan frame in E. The following properties of idempotents hold in E.

- An idempotent e is minimal in E if and only if E_{1}(e) has dimension one (so equals Re). Moreover E_{1/2}(e) ≠ (0). In fact the spectral projections of any element of E_{1}(e) lie in E so if non-zero must equal e. If the 1/2 eigenspace vanished then E_{1}(e) = Re would be an ideal.
- If e and f are non-orthogonal minimal idempotents, then there is a period 2 automorphism σ of E such that σe=f, so that e and f have the same trace.
- If e and f are orthogonal minimal idempotents then E_{1/2}(e) ∩ E_{1/2}(f) ≠ (0). Moreover, there is a period 2 automorphism σ of E such that σe=f, so that e and f have the same trace, and for any a in this intersection, a^{2} = 1/2 τ(e) |a|^{2} (e + f).
- All minimal idempotents in E are in the same orbit of the automorphism group so have the same trace τ_{0}.
- If e, f, g are three minimal orthogonal idempotents, then for a in E_{1/2}(e) ∩ E_{1/2}(f) and b in E_{1/2}(f) ∩ E_{1/2}(g), L(a)^{2} b = 1/8 τ_{0} |a|^{2} b and |ab|^{2} = 1/8 τ_{0} |a|^{2}|b|^{2}. Moreover, E_{1/2}(e) ∩ E_{1/2}(f) ∩ E_{1/2}(g) = (0).
- If e_{1}, ..., e_{r} and f_{1}, ..., f_{r} are Jordan frames in E, then there is an automorphism α such that αe_{i} = f_{i}.
- If (e_{i}) is a Jordan frame and E_{ii} = E_{1}(e_{i}) and E_{ij} = E_{1/2}(e_{i}) ∩ E_{1/2}(e_{j}), then E is the orthogonal direct sum the E_{ii}'s and E_{ij}'s. Since E is simple, the E_{ii}'s are one-dimensional and the subspaces E_{ij} are all non-zero for i ≠ j.
- If a = Σ α_{i} e_{i} for some Jordan frame (e_{i}), then L(a) acts as α_{i} on E_{ii} and (α_{i} + α_{i})/2 on E_{ij}.

=== Reduction to Euclidean Hurwitz algebras ===
Let E be a simple Euclidean Jordan algebra. From the properties of the Peirce decomposition it follows that:

- If E has rank 2, then it has the form V ⊕ R for some inner product space V with Jordan product as described above.
- If E has rank r > 2, then there is a non-associative unital algebra A, associative if r > 3, equipped with an inner product satisfying (ab,ab)= (a,a)(b,b) and such that E = H_{r}(A). (Conjugation in A is defined by a* = −a + 2(a,1)1.)

Such an algebra A is called a Euclidean Hurwitz algebra. In A if λ(a)b = ab and ρ(a)b = ba, then:

- the involution is an antiautomorphism, i.e. (a b)*=b* a*
- a a* = ‖ a ‖^{2} 1 = a* a
- λ(a*) = λ(a)*, ρ(a*) = ρ(a)*, so that the involution on the algebra corresponds to taking adjoints
- Re(a b) = Re(b a) if Re x = (x + x*)/2 = (x, 1)1
- Re(a b) c = Re a(b c)
- λ(a^{2}) = λ(a)^{2}, ρ(a^{2}) = ρ(a)^{2}, so that A is an alternative algebra.

By Hurwitz's theorem A must be isomorphic to R, C, H or O. The first three are associative division algebras. The octonions do not form an associative algebra, so H_{r}(O) can only give a Jordan algebra for r = 3. Because A is associative when A = R, C or H, it is immediate that H_{r}(A) is a Jordan algebra for r ≥ 3. A separate argument, given originally by Albert (1934), is required to show that H_{3}(O) with Jordan product a∘b = 1/2(ab + ba) satisfies the Jordan identity [L(a),L(a^{2})] = 0. There is a later more direct proof using the Freudenthal diagonalization theorem due to Freudenthal (1951): he proved that given any matrix in the algebra H_{r}(A) there is an algebra automorphism carrying the matrix onto a diagonal matrix with real entries; it is then straightforward to check that [L(a),L(b)] = 0 for real diagonal matrices.

=== Exceptional and special Euclidean Jordan algebras ===
The exceptional Euclidean Jordan algebra E= H_{3}(O) is called the Albert algebra. The Cohn–Shirshov theorem implies that it cannot be generated by two elements (and the identity). This can be seen directly. For by Freudenthal's diagonalization theorem one element X can be taken to be a diagonal matrix with real entries and the other Y to be orthogonal to the Jordan subalgebra generated by X. If all the diagonal entries of X are distinct, the Jordan subalgebra generated by X and Y is generated by the diagonal matrices and three elements

$$\displaystyle{Y_1=\begin{pmatrix} 0 & 0 & 0\\ 0 & 0 & y_1\\0 & y_1^* & 0\end{pmatrix},\,\,\,
Y_2=\begin{pmatrix} 0 & 0 & y_2^*\\ 0 & 0 & 0\\y_2 & 0 & 0\end{pmatrix},\,\,\,
Y_3=\begin{pmatrix} 0 & y_3 & 0\\ y_3^* & 0 & 0\\0 & 0 & 0\end{pmatrix}.}$$

It is straightforward to verify that the real linear span of the diagonal matrices, these matrices and similar matrices with real entries form a unital Jordan subalgebra. If the diagonal entries of X are not distinct, X can be taken to be the primitive idempotent e_{1} with diagonal entries 1, 0 and 0. The analysis in Springer & Veldkamp (2000) then shows that the unital Jordan subalgebra generated by X and Y is proper. Indeed, if 1 − e_{1} is the sum of two primitive idempotents in the subalgebra, then, after applying an automorphism of E if necessary, the subalgebra will be generated by the diagonal matrices and a matrix orthogonal to the diagonal matrices. By the previous argument it will be proper. If 1 - e_{1} is a primitive idempotent, the subalgebra must be proper, by the properties of the rank in E.

A Euclidean algebra is said to be special if its central decomposition contains no copies of the Albert algebra. Since the Albert algebra cannot be generated by two elements, it follows that a Euclidean Jordan algebra generated by two elements is special. This is the Shirshov–Cohn theorem for Euclidean Jordan algebras.

The classification shows that each non-exceptional simple Euclidean Jordan algebra is a subalgebra of some H_{n}(R). The same is therefore true of any special algebra.

On the other hand, as Albert (1934) showed, the Albert algebra H_{3}(O) cannot be realized as a subalgebra of H_{n}(R) for any n.

Indeed, let π is a real-linear map of E = H_{3}(O) into the self-adjoint operators on V = R^{n} with π(ab) = 1/2(π(a)π(b) + π(b)π(a)) and π(1) = I. If e_{1}, e_{2}, e_{3} are the diagonal minimal idempotents then P_{i} = π(e_{i} are mutually orthogonal projections on V onto orthogonal subspaces V_{i}. If i ≠ j, the elements e_{ij} of E with 1 in the (i,j) and (j,i) entries and 0 elsewhere satisfy e_{ij}^{2} = e_{i} + e_{j}. Moreover, e_{ij}e_{jk} = 1/2 e_{ik} if i, j and k are distinct. The operators T_{ij} are zero on V_{k} (k ≠ i, j) and restrict to involutions on V_{i} ⊕ V_{j} interchanging V_{i} and V_{j}. Letting P_{ij} = P_{i} T_{ij} P_{j} and setting P_{ii} = P_{i}, the (P_{ij}) form a system of matrix units on V, i.e. P_{ij}* = P_{ji}, Σ P_{ii} = I and P_{ij}P_{km} = δ_{jk} P_{im}. Let E_{i} and E_{ij} be the subspaces of the Peirce decomposition of E. For x in O, set π_{ij} = P_{ij} π(xe_{ij}), regarded as an operator on V_{i}. This does not depend on j and for x, y in O

$$\displaystyle{\pi_{ij}(xy) =\pi_{ij}(x)\pi_{ij}(y),\,\,\, \pi_{ij}(1)= I.}$$

Since every x in O has a right inverse y with xy = 1, the map π_{ij} is injective. On the other hand, it is an algebra homomorphism from the nonassociative algebra O into the associative algebra End V_{i}, a contradiction.

== Positive cone in a Euclidean Jordan algebra ==
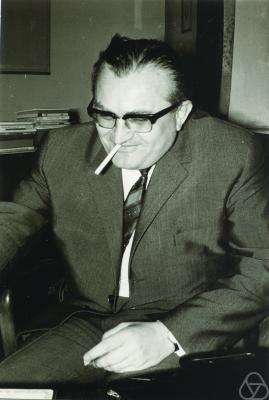
Max Koecher pioneered the use of Jordan algebras in studying symmetric spaces

=== Definition ===
When (e_{i}) is a partition of 1 in a Euclidean Jordan algebra E, the self-adjoint operators L(e_{i}) commute and there is a decomposition into simultaneous eigenspaces. If a = Σ λ_{i} e_{i} the eigenvalues of L(a) have the form Σ ε_{i} λ_{i} is 0, 1/2 or 1. The e_{i} themselves give the eigenvalues λ_{i}. In particular an element a has non-negative spectrum if and only if L(a) has non-negative spectrum. Moreover, a has positive spectrum if and only if L(a) has positive spectrum. For if a has positive spectrum, a - ε1 has non-negative spectrum for some ε > 0.

The positive cone C in E is defined to be the set of elements a such that a has positive spectrum. This condition is equivalent to the operator L(a) being a positive self-adjoint operator on E.

- C is a convex cone in E because positivity of a self-adjoint operator T— the property that its eigenvalues be strictly positive—is equivalent to (Tv,v) > 0 for all v ≠ 0.
- C is an open because the positive matrices are open in the self-adjoint matrices and L is a continuous map: in fact, if the lowest eigenvalue of T is ε > 0, then T + S is positive whenever ||S|| < ε.
- The closure of C consists of all a such that L(a) is non-negative or equivalently a has non-negative spectrum. From the elementary properties of convex cones, C is the interior of its closure and is a proper cone. The elements in the closure of C are precisely the square of elements in E.
- C is self-dual. In fact the elements of the closure of C are just set of all squares x^{2} in E, the dual cone is given by all a such that (a,x^{2}) > 0. On the other hand, (a,x^{2}) = (L(a)x,x), so this is equivalent to the positivity of L(a).

=== Quadratic representation ===
To show that the positive cone C is homogeneous, i.e. has a transitive group of automorphisms, a generalization of the quadratic action of self-adjoint matrices on themselves given by X ↦ YXY has to be defined. If Y is invertible and self-adjoint, this map is invertible and carries positive operators onto positive operators.

For a in E, define an endomorphism of E, called the quadratic representation, by

$$\displaystyle{Q(a) = 2L(a)^2 - L\left(a^2\right).}$$

Note that for self-adjoint matrices L(X)Y = 1/2(XY + YX), so that Q(X)Y = XYX.

An element a in E is called invertible if it is invertible in R[a]. If b denotes the inverse, then the spectral decomposition of a shows that L(a) and L(b) commute.

In fact a is invertible if and only if Q(a) is invertible. In that case

$\displaystyle{Q(a)^{-1}a = a^{-1},\,\,\, Q\left(a^{-1}\right) = Q(a)^{-1}.}$

Indeed, if Q(a) is invertible it carries R[a] onto itself. On the other hand, Q(a)1 = a^{2}, so

$$\displaystyle{\left(Q(a)^{-1} a\right)a = a Q(a)^{-1} a = L(a)Q(a)^{-1}a = Q(a)^{-1}a^2 =1.}$$

Taking b = a^{−1} in the polarized Jordan identity, yields

$$\displaystyle{Q(a)L\left(a^{-1}\right) = L(a).}$$

Replacing a by its inverse, the relation follows if L(a) and L(a^{−1}) are invertible. If not it holds for a + ε1 with ε arbitrarily small and hence also in the limit.

- If a and b are invertible then so is Q(a)b and it satisfies the inverse identity:
  $$\displaystyle{(Q(a)b)^{-1} = Q\left(a^{-1}\right)b^{-1}.}$$
- The quadratic representation satisfies the following fundamental identity:
  $$\displaystyle{Q(Q(a)b) = Q(a)Q(b)Q(a).}$$
- In particular, taking b to be non-negative powers of a, it follows by induction that
  $$\displaystyle{Q\left(a^m\right) = Q(a)^m.}$$

These identities are easy to prove in a finite-dimensional (Euclidean) Jordan algebra (see below) or in a special Jordan algebra, i.e. the Jordan algebra defined by a unital associative algebra. They are valid in any Jordan algebra. This was conjectured by Jacobson and proved in Macdonald (1960): Macdonald showed that if a polynomial identity in three variables, linear in the third, is valid in any special Jordan algebra, then it holds in all Jordan algebras.

In fact for c in A and F(a) a function on A with values in End A, let D_{c}F(a) be the derivative at t = 0 of F(a + tc). Then

$$\displaystyle{c = D_c\left(Q(a)a^{-1}\right) = 2\left[(L(a)L(c) + L(c)L(a) - L(ac))a^{-1}\right] + Q(a)D_c\left(a^{-1}\right) = 2c + Q(a)D_c\left(a^{-1}\right).}$$

The expression in square brackets simplifies to c because L(a) commutes with L(a^{−1}).

Thus

$\displaystyle{D_c\left(a^{-1}\right) = -Q(a)^{-1}c.}$

Applying D_{c} to L(a^{−1})Q(a) = L(a) and acting on b = c^{−1} yields

$$\displaystyle{(Q(a)b)\left(Q\left(a^{-1}\right)b^{-1}\right) = 1.}$$

On the other hand, L(Q(a)b) is invertible on an open dense set where Q(a)b must also be invertible with

$$\displaystyle{(Q(a)b)^{-1} = Q\left(a^{-1}\right)b^{-1}.}$$

Taking the derivative D_{c} in the variable b in the expression above gives

$$\displaystyle{-Q(Q(a)b)^{-1}Q(a)c = -Q(a)^{-1}Q(b)^{-1}c.}$$

This yields the fundamental identity for a dense set of invertible elements, so it follows in general by continuity. The fundamental identity implies that c = Q(a)b is invertible if a and b are invertible and gives a formula for the inverse of Q(c). Applying it to c gives the inverse identity in full generality.

Finally it can be verified immediately from the definitions that, if u = 1 − 2e for some idempotent e, then Q(u) is the period 2 automorphism constructed above for the centralizer algebra and module of e.

=== Homogeneity of positive cone ===
If a is an invertible operator and b is in the positive cone C, then so is Q(a)b.

The proof of this relies on elementary continuity properties of eigenvalues of self-adjoint operators.

Let T(t) (α ≤ t ≤ β) be a continuous family of self-adjoint operators on E with T(α) positive and T(β) having a negative eigenvalue. Set S(t)= –T(t) + M with M > 0 chosen so large that S(t) is positive for all t. The operator norm ||S(t)|| is continuous. It is less than M for t = α and greater than M for t = β. So for some α < s < β, ||S(s)|| = M and there is a vector v ≠ 0 such that S(s)v = Mv. In particular T(s)v = 0, so that T(s) is not invertible.

Suppose that x = Q(a)b does not lie in C. Let b(t) = (1 − t) + tb with 0 ≤ t ≤ 1. By convexity b(t) lies in C. Let x(t) = Q(a)b(t) and X(t) = L(x(t)). If X(t) is invertible for all t with 0 ≤ t ≤ 1, the eigenvalue argument gives a contradiction since it is positive at t = 0 and has negative eigenvalues at t = 1. So X(s) has a zero eigenvalue for some s with 0 < s ≤ 1: X(s)w = 0 with w ≠ 0. By the properties of the quadratic representation, x(t) is invertible for all t. Let Y(t) = L(x(t)^{2}). This is a positive operator since x(t)^{2} lies in C. Let T(t) = Q(x(t)), an invertible self-adjoint operator by the invertibility of x(t). On the other hand, T(t) = 2X(t)^{2} - Y(t). So (T(s)w,w) < 0 since Y(s) is positive and X(s)w = 0. In particular T(s) has some negative eigenvalues. On the other hand, the operator T(0) = Q(a^{2}) = Q(a)^{2} is positive. By the eigenvalue argument, T(t) has eigenvalue 0 for some t with 0 < t < s, a contradiction.

It follows that the linear operators Q(a) with a invertible, and their inverses, take the cone C onto itself. Indeed, the inverse of Q(a) is just Q(a^{−1}). Since Q(a)1 = a^{2}, there is thus a transitive group of symmetries:

C is a symmetric cone.

== Euclidean Jordan algebra of a symmetric cone ==
=== Construction ===
Let C be a symmetric cone in the Euclidean space E. As above, Aut C denotes the closed subgroup of GL(E) taking C (or equivalently its closure) onto itself. Let G = Aut_{0} C be its identity component. K = G ∩ O(E). It is a maximal compact subgroup of G and the stabilizer of a point e in C. It is connected. The group G is invariant under taking adjoints. Let σg =(g*)^{−1}, period 2 automorphism. Thus K is the fixed point subgroup of σ. Let $\mathfrak{g}$ be the Lie algebra of G. Thus σ induces an involution of $\mathfrak{g}$ and hence a ±1 eigenspace decomposition

$$\displaystyle{\mathfrak{g}=\mathfrak{k} \oplus \mathfrak{p},}$$

where $\mathfrak{k}$, the +1 eigenspace, is the Lie algebra of K and $\mathfrak{p}$ is the −1 eigenspace. Thus $\mathfrak{p}$⋅e is an affine subspace of dimension dim $\mathfrak{p}$. Since C = G/K is an open subspace of E, it follows that dim E = dim $\mathfrak{p}$ and hence $\mathfrak{p}$⋅e = E. For a in E let L(a) be the unique element of $\mathfrak{p}$ such that L(a)e = a. Define a ∘ b = L(a)b. Then E with its Euclidean structure and this bilinear product is a Euclidean Jordan algebra with identity 1 = e. The convex cone coincides C with the positive cone of E.

Since the elements of $\mathfrak{p}$ are self-adjoint, L(a)* = L(a). The product is commutative since [$\mathfrak{p}$, $\mathfrak{p}$] ⊆ $\mathfrak{k}$ annihilates e, so that ab = L(a)L(b)e = L(b)L(a)e = ba. It remains to check the Jordan identity [L(a),L(a^{2})] = 0.

The associator is given by [a,b,c] = [L(a),L(c)]b. Since [L(a),L(c)] lies in $\mathfrak{k}$ it follows that [[L(a),L(c)],L(b)] = L([a,b,c]). Making both sides act on c yields
$$\displaystyle{[a,b^2,c] = 2[a,b,c]b.}$$

On the other hand,
$$\displaystyle{([b^2,a,b],c)=(b^2(ba)-b(b^2a),c) =-(b^2,[a,b,c])}$$
and likewise
$$\displaystyle{([b^2,a,b],c)=(b,[a,b^2,c]).}$$
Combining these expressions gives
$$\displaystyle{([b^2,a,b],c) =0,}$$
which implies the Jordan identity.

Finally the positive cone of E coincides with C. This depends on the fact that in any Euclidean Jordan algebra E

$$\displaystyle{Q(e^a)=e^{2L(a)}.}$$

In fact Q(e^{a}) is a positive operator, Q(e^{ta}) is a one-parameter group of positive operators: this follows by continuity for rational t, where it is a consequence of the behaviour of powers So it has the form exp tX for some self-adjoint operator X. Taking the derivative at 0 gives X = 2L(a).

Hence the positive cone is given by all elements

$$\displaystyle{e^{2a} =Q(e^{a})1= e^{2L(a)}1 = e^X\cdot 1,}$$

with X in $\mathfrak{p}$. Thus the positive cone of E lies inside C. Since both are self-dual, they must coincide.

=== Automorphism groups and trace form ===
Let C be the positive cone in a simple Euclidean Jordan algebra E. Aut C is the closed subgroup of GL(E) taking C (or its closure) onto itself. Let G = Aut_{0} C be the identity component of Aut C and let K be the closed subgroup of G fixing 1. From the group theoretic properties of cones, K is a connected compact subgroup of G and equals the identity component of the compact Lie group Aut E. Let $\mathfrak{g}$ and $\mathfrak{k}$ be the Lie algebras of G and K. G is closed under taking adjoints and K is the fixed point subgroup of the period 2 automorphism σ(g) = (g*)^{−1}. Thus K = G ∩ SO(E). Let $\mathfrak{p}$ be the −1 eigenspace of σ.

- $\mathfrak{k}$ consists of derivations of E that are skew-adjoint for the inner product defined by the trace form.
- [[L(a),L(c)],L(b)] = L([a,b,c]).
- If a and b are in E, then D = [L(a),L(b)] is a derivation of E, so lies in $\mathfrak{k}$. These derivations span $\mathfrak{k}$.
- If a is in C, then Q(a) lies in G.
- C is the connected component of the open set of invertible elements of E containing 1. It consists of exponentials of elements of E and the exponential map gives a diffeomorphism of E onto C.
- The map a ↦ L(a) gives an isomorphism of E onto $\mathfrak{p}$ and e^{L(a)} = Q(e^{a/2}). This space of such exponentials coincides with P the positive self-adjoint elements in G.
- For g in G and a in E, Q(g(a)) = g Q(a) g*.

=== Cartan decomposition ===
- G = P ⋅ K = K ⋅ P and the decomposition g = pk corresponds to the polar decomposition in GL(E).
- If (e_{i}) is a Jordan frame in E, then the subspace $\mathfrak{a}$ of $\mathfrak{p}$ spanned by L(e_{i}) is maximal Abelian in $\mathfrak{p}$. A = exp $\mathfrak{a}$ is the Abelian subgroup of operators Q(a) where a = Σ λ_{i} e_{i} with λ_{i} > 0. A is closed in P and hence G. If b =Σ μ_{i} e_{i} with μ_{i} > 0, then Q(ab)=Q(a)Q(b).
- $\mathfrak{p}$ and P are the union of the K translates of $\mathfrak{a}$ and A.

=== Iwasawa decomposition for cone ===
If E has Peirce decomposition relative to the Jordan frame (e_{i})

$$\displaystyle{E=\bigoplus_{i\le j} E_{ij},}$$

then $\mathfrak{a}$ is diagonalized by this decomposition with L(a) acting as (α_{i} + α_{j})/2 on E_{ij}, where a = Σ α_{i} e_{i}.

Define the closed subgroup S of G by

$$\displaystyle{S=\{g\in G|gE_{ij}\subseteq \bigoplus_{(p,q)\ge (i,j)} E_{pq}\},}$$

where the ordering on pairs p ≤ q is lexicographic. S contains the group A, since it acts as scalars on E_{ij}. If N is the closed subgroup of S such that nx = x modulo ⊕_{(p,q) > (i,j)} E_{pq}, then S = AN = NA, a semidirect product with A normalizing N. Moreover, G has the following Iwasawa decomposition:

$$\displaystyle{G=KAN.}$$

For i ≠ j let

$$\displaystyle{\mathfrak{g}_{ij} =\{X\in \mathfrak{g}:[L(a),X]={1\over 2}(\alpha_i-\alpha_j)X, \,\,\,\mathrm{for}\,\,\, a=\sum \alpha_i e_i\}.}$$

Then the Lie algebra of N is

$$\displaystyle{\mathfrak{n}=\bigoplus_{i<j}  \mathfrak{g}_{ij},\,\,\,\, \mathfrak{g}_{ij} = \{L(a) +2[L(a),L(e_i)]:a\in E_{ij}\}.}$$

Taking ordered orthonormal bases of the E_{ij} gives a basis of E, using the lexicographic order on pairs (i,j). The group N is lower unitriangular and its Lie algebra lower triangular. In particular the exponential map is a polynomial mapping of $\mathfrak{n}$ onto N, with polynomial inverse given by the logarithm.

== Complexification of a Euclidean Jordan algebra ==
=== Definition of complexification ===
Let E be a Euclidean Jordan algebra. The complexification E_{C} = E ⊕ iE has a natural conjugation operation (a + ib)* = a − ib and a natural complex inner product and norm. The Jordan product on E extends bilinearly to E_{C}, so that (a + ib)(c + id) = (ac − bd) + i(ad + bc). If multiplication is defined by L(a)b = ab then the Jordan axiom
$$\displaystyle{[L(a),L(a^2)]=0}$$
still holds by analytic continuation. Indeed, the identity above holds when a is replaced by a + tb for t real; and since the left side is then a polynomial with values in End E_{C} vanishing for real t, it vanishes also t complex. Analytic continuation also shows that all for the formulas involving power-associativity for a single element a in E, including recursion formulas for L(a^{m}), also hold in E_{C}. Since for b in E, L(b) is still self-adjoint on E_{C}, the adjoint relation L(a*) = L(a)* holds for a in E_{C}. Similarly the symmetric bilinear form β(a,b) = (a,b*) satisfies β(ab,c) = β(b,ac). If the inner product comes from the trace form, then β(a,b) = Tr L(ab).

For a in E_{C}, the quadratic representation is defined as before by Q(a)=2L(a)^{2} − L(a^{2}). By analytic continuation the fundamental identity still holds:

$$\displaystyle{Q(Q(a)b)=Q(a)Q(b)Q(a),\,\,\,Q(a^m)=Q(a)^m \,\,(m\ge 0).}$$

An element a in E is called invertible if it is invertible in C[a]. Power associativity shows that L(a) and L(a^{−1}) commute. Moreover, a^{−1} is invertible with inverse a.

As in E, a is invertible if and only if Q(a) is invertible. In that case
$$\displaystyle{Q(a)^{-1}a=a^{-1},\,\,\, Q(a^{-1})=Q(a)^{-1}.}$$

Indeed, as for E, if Q(a) is invertible it carries C[a] onto itself, while Q(a)1 = a^{2}, so
$$\displaystyle{(Q(a)^{-1} a)a=a Q(a)^{-1} a=L(a)Q(a)^{-1}a=Q(a)^{-1}a^2 =1,}$$
so a is invertible. Conversely if a is invertible, taking b = a^{−2} in the fundamental identity shows that Q(a) is invertible. Replacing a by a^{−1} and b by a then shows that its inverse is Q(a^{−1}). Finally if a and b are invertible then so is c = Q(a)b and it satisfies the inverse identity:

$$\displaystyle{(Q(a)b)^{-1}=Q(a^{-1})b^{-1}.}$$

Invertibility of c follows from the fundamental formula which gives Q(c) = Q(a)Q(b)Q(a). Hence

$$\displaystyle{c^{-1}=Q(c)^{-1}c=Q(a)^{-1}Q(b)^{-1} b= Q(a)^{-1}b^{-1}.}$$

The formula

$$\displaystyle{Q(e^a) = e^{2L(a)}}$$

also follows by analytic continuation.

=== Complexification of automorphism group ===
Aut E_{C} is the complexification of the compact Lie group Aut E in GL(E_{C}). This follows because the Lie algebras of Aut E_{C} and Aut E consist of derivations of the complex and real Jordan algebras E_{C} and E. Under the isomorphism identifying End E_{C} with the complexification of End E, the complex derivations is identified with the complexification of the real derivations.

=== Structure groups ===
The Jordan operator L(a) are symmetric with respect to the trace form, so that L(a)^{t} = L(a) for a in E_{C}. The automorphism groups of E and E_{C} consist of invertible real and complex linear operators g such that L(ga) = gL(a)g^{−1} and g1 = 1. Aut E_{C} is the complexification of Aut E. Since an automorphism g preserves the trace form, g^{−1} = g^{t}.

The structure groups of E and E_{C} consist of invertible real and complex linear operators g such that

$$\displaystyle{Q(ga)=gQ(a)g^t.}$$

They form groups Γ(E) and Γ(E_{C}) with Γ(E) ⊂ Γ(E_{C}).

- The structure group is closed under taking transposes g ↦ g^{t} and adjoints g ↦ g*.
- The structure group contains the automorphism group. The automorphism group can be identified with the stabilizer of 1 in the structure group.
- If a is invertible, Q(a) lies in the structure group.
- If g is in the structure group and a is invertible, ga is also invertible with (ga)^{−1} = (g^{t})^{−1}a^{−1}.
- If E is simple, Γ(E) = Aut C × {±1}, Γ(E) ∩ O(E) = Aut E × {±1} and the identity component of Γ(E) acts transitively on C.
- Γ(E_{C}) is the complexification of Γ(E), which has Lie algebra $\mathfrak{k}\oplus \mathfrak{p}$.
- The structure group Γ(E_{C}) acts transitively on the set of invertible elements in E_{C}.
- Every g in Γ(E_{C}) has the form g = h Q(a) with h an automorphism and a invertible.

The unitary structure group Γ_{u}(E_{C}) is the subgroup of Γ(E_{C}) consisting of unitary operators, so that Γ_{u}(E_{C}) = Γ(E_{C}) ∩ U(E_{C}).

- The stabilizer of 1 in Γ_{u}(E_{C}) is Aut E.
- Every g in Γ_{u}(E_{C}) has the form g = h Q(u) with h in Aut E and u invertible in E_{C} with u* = u^{−1}.
- Γ(E_{C}) is the complexification of Γ_{u}(E_{C}), which has Lie algebra $\mathfrak{k}\oplus i \mathfrak{p}$.
- The set S of invertible elements u such that u* = u^{−1} can be characterized equivalently either as those u for which L(u) is a normal operator with uu* = 1 or as those u of the form exp ia for some a in E. In particular S is connected.
- The identity component of Γ_{u}(E_{C}) acts transitively on S
- g in GL(E_{C}) is in the unitary structure group if and only if gS = S
- Given a Jordan frame (e_{i}) and v in E_{C}, there is an operator u in the identity component of Γ_{u}(E_{C}) such that uv = Σ α_{i} e_{i} with α_{i} ≥ 0. If v is invertible, then α_{i} > 0.

Given a frame (e_{i}) in a Euclidean Jordan algebra E, the restricted Weyl group can be identified with the group of operators on ⊕ R e_{i} arising from elements in the identity component of Γ_{u}(E_{C}) that leave ⊕ R e_{i} invariant.

=== Spectral norm ===
Let E be a Euclidean Jordan algebra with the inner product given by the trace form. Let (e_{i}) be a fixed Jordan frame in E. For given a in E_{C} choose u in Γ_{u}(E_{C}) such that ua = Σ α_{i} e_{i} with α_{i} ≥ 0. Then the spectral norm ||a|| = max α_{i} is independent of all choices. It is a norm on E_{C} with

$$\displaystyle{\|a^*\| = \|a\|,\,\,\, \|\{a,a^*,a\}\| =\|a\|^3.}$$

In addition ||a||^{2} is given by the operator norm of Q(a) on the inner product space E_{C}. The fundamental identity for the quadratic representation implies that ||Q(a)b|| ≤ ||a||^{2}||b||. The spectral norm of an element a is defined in terms of C[a] so depends only on a and not the particular Euclidean Jordan algebra in which it is calculated.

The compact set S is the set of extreme points of the closed unit ball ||x|| ≤ 1. Each u in S has norm one. Moreover, if u = e^{ia} and v = e^{ib}, then ||uv|| ≤ 1. Indeed, by the Cohn–Shirshov theorem the unital Jordan subalgebra of E generated by a and b is special. The inequality is easy to establish in non-exceptional simple Euclidean Jordan algebras, since each such Jordan algebra and its complexification can be realized as a subalgebra of some H_{n}(R) and its complexification H_{n}(C) ⊂ M_{n}(C). The spectral norm in H_{n}(C) is the usual operator norm. In that case, for unitary matrices U and V in M_{n}(C), clearly ||1/2(UV + VU)|| ≤ 1. The inequality therefore follows in any special Euclidean Jordan algebra and hence in general.

On the other hand, by the Krein–Milman theorem, the closed unit ball is the (closed) convex span of S. It follows that ||L(u)|| = 1, in the operator norm corresponding to either the inner product norm or spectral norm. Hence ||L(a)|| ≤ ||a|| for all a, so that the spectral norm satisfies

$$\displaystyle{\|ab\|\le \|a\|\cdot \|b\|.}$$

It follows that E_{C} is a Jordan C* algebra.

=== Complex simple Jordan algebras ===
The complexification of a simple Euclidean Jordan algebra is a simple complex Jordan algebra which is also separable, i.e. its trace form is non-degenerate. Conversely, using the existence of a real form of the Lie algebra of the structure group, it can be shown that every complex separable simple Jordan algebra is the complexification of a simple Euclidean Jordan algebra.

To verify that the complexification of a simple Euclidean Jordan algebra E has no ideals, note that if F is an ideal in E^{C} then so too is F^{⊥}, the orthogonal complement for the trace norm. As in the real case, J = F^{⊥} ∩ F must equal (0). For the associativity property of the trace form shows that F^{⊥} is an ideal and that ab = 0 if a and b lie in J. Hence J is an ideal. But if z is in J, L(z) takes E_{C} into J and J into (0). Hence Tr L(z) = 0. Since J is an ideal and the trace form degenerate, this forces z = 0. It follows that E_{C} = F ⊕ F^{⊥}. If P is the corresponding projection onto F, it commutes with the operators L(a) and F^{⊥} = (I − P)E_{C}. is also an ideal and E = F ⊕ F^{⊥}. Furthermore, if e = P(1), then P = L(e). In fact for a in E

$$\displaystyle{ea=ae=L(a)P(1)=P(L(a)1)=P(a),}$$

so that ea = a for a in F and 0 for a in F^{⊥}. In particular e and 1 − e are orthogonal central idempotents with L(e) = P and L(1 − e) = I − P.

So simplicity follows from the fact that the center of E_{C} is the complexification of the center of E.

== Symmetry groups of bounded domain and tube domain ==
According to the "elementary approach" to bounded symmetric space of Koecher, Hermitian symmetric spaces of noncompact type can be realized in the complexification of a Euclidean Jordan algebra E as either the open unit ball for the spectral norm, a bounded domain, or as the open tube domain T = E + iC, where C is the positive open cone in E. In the simplest case where E = R, the complexification of E is just C, the bounded domain corresponds to the open unit disk and the tube domain to the upper half plane. Both these spaces have transitive groups of biholomorphisms given by Möbius transformations, corresponding to matrices in SU(1,1) or SL(2,R). They both lie in the Riemann sphere C ∪ {∞}, the standard one-point compactification of C. Moreover, the symmetry groups are all particular cases of Möbius transformations corresponding to matrices in SL(2,C). This complex Lie group and its maximal compact subgroup SU(2) act transitively on the Riemann sphere. The groups are also algebraic. They have distinguished generating subgroups and have an explicit description in terms of generators and relations. Moreover, the Cayley transform gives an explicit Möbius transformation from the open disk onto the upper half plane. All these features generalize to arbitrary Euclidean Jordan algebras. The compactification and complex Lie group are described in the next section and correspond to the dual Hermitian symmetric space of compact type. In this section only the symmetries of and between the bounded domain and tube domain are described.

Jordan frames provide one of the main Jordan algebraic techniques to describe the symmetry groups. Each Jordan frame gives rise to a product of copies of R and C. The symmetry groups of the corresponding open domains and the compactification—polydisks and polyspheres—can be deduced from the case of the unit disk, the upper halfplane and Riemann sphere. All these symmetries extend to the larger Jordan algebra and its compactification. The analysis can also be reduced to this case because all points in the complex algebra (or its compactification) lie in an image of the polydisk (or polysphere) under the unitary structure group.

=== Definitions ===
Let E be a Euclidean Jordan algebra with complexification A = E_{C} = E + iE.

The unit ball or disk D in A is just the convex bounded open set of elements a such the ||a|| < 1, i.e. the unit ball for the spectral norm.

The tube domain T in A is the unbounded convex open set T = E + iC, where C is the open positive cone in E.

=== Möbius transformations ===
The group SL(2,C) acts by Möbius transformations on the Riemann sphere C ∪ {∞}, the one-point compactification of C. If g in SL(2,C) is given by the matrix

$$\displaystyle{g=\begin{pmatrix}\alpha & \beta \\ \gamma & \delta\end{pmatrix},}$$

then

$$\displaystyle{g(z)=(\alpha z +\beta)(\gamma z +\delta)^{-1}.}$$

Similarly the group SL(2,R) acts by Möbius transformations on the circle R ∪ {∞}, the one-point compactification of R.

Let k = R or C. Then SL(2,k) is generated by the three subgroups of lower and upper unitriangular matrices, L and U', and the diagonal matrices D. It is also generated by the lower (or upper) unitriangular matrices, the diagonal matrices and the matrix

$$\displaystyle{J=\begin{pmatrix}0 & 1 \\ -1 & 0\end{pmatrix}.}$$

The matrix J corresponds to the Möbius transformation j(z) = −z^{−1} and can be written

$$\displaystyle{J=\begin{pmatrix}1 & 0 \\ -1 & 1\end{pmatrix}\begin{pmatrix}1 & 1 \\ 0 & 1\end{pmatrix}
\begin{pmatrix}1 & 0 \\ -1 & 1\end{pmatrix}.}$$

The Möbius transformations fixing ∞ are just the upper triangular matrices B = UD = DU. If g does not fix ∞, it sends ∞ to a finite point a. But then g can be composed with an upper unitriangular matrix to send a to 0 and then with J to send 0 to infinity. This argument gives one of the simplest examples of the Bruhat decomposition:

$$\displaystyle{\mathbf{SL}(2,k) = \mathbf{B} \cup \mathbf{B}\cdot J\cdot \mathbf{B},}$$

the double coset decomposition of SL(2,k). In fact the union is disjoint and can be written more precisely as

$$\displaystyle{\mathbf{SL}(2,k) = \mathbf{B} \cup  \mathbf{B} \cdot J\cdot\mathbf{U},}$$

where the product occurring in the second term is direct.

Now let

$$\displaystyle{T(\beta)=\begin{pmatrix}1 & \beta \\ 0 & 1\end{pmatrix}.}$$

Then

$$\displaystyle{\begin{pmatrix}\alpha & 0 \\ 0 & \alpha^{-1}\end{pmatrix} = JT(\alpha^{-1}) JT(\alpha)JT(\alpha^{-1}).}$$

It follows SL(2,k) is generated by the group of operators T(β) and J subject to the following relations:

- β ↦ T(β) is an additive homomorphism
- α ↦ D(α) = JT(α^{−1})JT(α)JT(α^{−1}) is a multiplicative homomorphism
- D(−1) = J
- D(α)T(β)D(α)^{−1} = T(α^{2}β)
- JD(α)J^{−1} = D(α)^{−1}

The last relation follows from the definition of D(α). The generator and relations above is fact gives a presentation of SL(2,k). Indeed, consider the free group Φ generated by J and T(β) with J of order 4 and its square central. This consists of all products T(β_{1})JT(β_{2})JT(β_{3})J ... T(β_{m})J for m ≥ 0. There is a natural homomorphism of Φ onto SL(2,k). Its kernel contain the normal subgroup Δ generated by the relations above. So there is a natural homomorphism of Φ/Δ onto SL(2,k). To show that it is injective it suffices to show that the Bruhat decomposition also holds in Φ/Δ. It is enough to prove the first version, since the more precise version follows from the commutation relations between J and D(α). The set B ∪ B J B is invariant under inversion, contains operators T(β) and J, so it is enough to show it is invariant under multiplication. By construction it is invariant under multiplication by B. It is invariant under multiplication by J because of the defining equation for D(α).

In particular the center of SL(2,k) consists of the scalar matrices ±I and it is the only non-trivial normal subgroup of SL(2,k), so that PSL(2,k) = SL(2,k)/{±I} is simple. In fact if K is a normal subgroup, then the Bruhat decomposition implies that B is a maximal subgroup, so that either K is contained in B or KB = SL(2,k). In the first case K fixes one point and hence every point of k ∪ {∞}, so lies in the center. In the second case, the commutator subgroup of SL(2,k) is the whole group, since it is the group generated by lower and upper unitriangular matrices and the fourth relation shows that all such matrices are commutators since [T(β),D(α)] = T(β − α^{2}β). Writing J = kb with k in K and b in B, it follows that L = k U k^{−1}. Since U and L generate the whole group, SL(2,k) = KU. But then SL(2,k)/K ≅ U/U ∩ K. The right hand side here is Abelian while the left hand side is its own commutator subgroup. Hence this must be the trivial group and K = SL(2,k).

Given an element a in the complex Jordan algebra A = E_{C}, the unital Jordan subalgebra C[a] is associative and commutative. Multiplication by a defines an operator on C[a] which has a spectrum, namely its set of complex eigenvalues. If p(t) is a complex polynomial, then p(a) is defined in C[a]. It is invertible in A if and only if it is invertible in C[a], which happen precisely when p does not vanish on the spectrum of a. This permits rational functions of a to be defined whenever the function is defined on the spectrum of a. If F and G are rational functions with G and F∘G defined on a, then F is defined on G(a) and F(G(a)) = (F∘G)(a). This applies in particular to complex Möbius transformations which can be defined by g(a) = (αa + β1)(γa + δ1)^{−1}. They leave C[a] invariant and, when defined, the group composition law holds. (In the next section complex Möbius transformations will be defined on the compactification of A.)

Given a primitive idempotent e in E with Peirce decomposition

$$\displaystyle{E=E_1(e)\oplus E_{1/2}(e)\oplus E_0(e),\,\,\,\, A=A_1(e)\oplus A_{1/2}(e)\oplus A_0(e).}$$

the action of SL(2,C) by Möbius transformations on E_{1}(e) = C e can be extended to an action on A so that the action leaves invariant the components A_{i}(e) and in particular acts trivially on E_{0}(e). If P_{0} is the projection onto A_{0}(e), the action is given be the formula

$$\displaystyle{g(z e\oplus x_{1/2} \oplus x_0)={\alpha z +\beta \over \gamma z +\delta}\cdot e \oplus (\gamma z +\delta)^{-1} x_{1/2} \oplus x_0 - (\gamma z + \delta)^{-1}P_0(x_{1/2}^2).}$$

For a Jordan frame of primitive idempotents e_{1}, ..., e_{m}, the actions of SL(2,C) associated with different e_{i} commute, thus giving an action of SL(2,C)^{m}. The diagonal copy of SL(2,C) gives again the action by Möbius transformations on A.

=== Cayley transform ===
The Möbius transformation defined by

$$\displaystyle{C(z)=i{1+z\over 1-z}=-i +{2i\over 1 - z}}$$

is called the Cayley transform. Its inverse is given by

$$\displaystyle{P(w)={w-i\over w+i} = 1 -{2i\over w+i}.}$$

The inverse Cayley transform carries the real line onto the circle with the point 1 omitted. It carries the upper halfplane onto the unit disk and the lower halfplane onto the complement of the closed unit disk. In operator theory the mapping T ↦ P(T) takes self-adjoint operators T onto unitary operators U not containing 1 in their spectrum. For matrices this follows because unitary and self-adjoint matrices can be diagonalized and their eigenvalues lie on the unit circle or real line. In this finite-dimensional setting the Cayley transform and its inverse establish a bijection between the matrices of operator norm less than one and operators with imaginary part a positive operator. This is the special case for A = M_{n}(C) of the Jordan algebraic result, explained below, which asserts that the Cayley transform and its inverse establish a bijection between the bounded domain D and the tube domain T.

In the case of matrices, the bijection follows from resolvent formulas. In fact if the imaginary part of T is positive, then T + iI is invertible since

$$\displaystyle{\|(T+iI)x\|^2= \|(T-iI)x\|^2 + 4(\mathrm{Im}(T)x,x).}$$

In particular, setting y = (T + iI)x,

$$\displaystyle{\|y\|^2= \|P(T)y\|^2 + 4(\mathrm{Im}(T)x,x).}$$

Equivalently

$$\displaystyle{I-P(T)^*P(T) =
4 (T^* -iI)^{-1}[\mathrm{Im}\,T] (T+iI)^{-1}}$$

is a positive operator, so that ||P(T)|| < 1. Conversely if ||U|| < 1 then I − U is invertible and

$$\displaystyle{\mathrm{Im}\,C(U)=(2i)^{-1}[C(U)-C(U)^*] =
(1-U^*)^{-1}[I -U^*U](I-U)^{-1}.}$$

Since the Cayley transform and its inverse commute with the transpose, they also establish a bijection for symmetric matrices. This corresponds to the Jordan algebra of symmetric complex matrices, the complexification of H_{n}(R).

In A = E_{C} the above resolvent identities take the following form:

$$\displaystyle{Q(1-u^*)Q(C(u)+C(u^*))Q(1-u)=-4B(u^*,u)}$$

and equivalently

$$\displaystyle{  4Q(\mathrm{Im} \,a) = Q(a^*-i)B(P(a)^*,P(a))Q(a+i),}$$

where the Bergman operator B(x,y) is defined by B(x,y) = I − 2R(x,y) + Q(x)Q(y) with R(x,y) = [L(x),L(y)] + L(xy). The inverses here are well defined. In fact in one direction 1 − u is invertible for ||u|| < 1: this follows either using the fact that the norm satisfies ||ab|| ≤ ||a|| ||b||; or using the resolvent identity and the invertibility of B(u*,u) (see below). In the other direction if the imaginary part of a is in C then the imaginary part of L(a) is positive definite so that a is invertible. This argument can be applied to a + i, so it also invertible.

To establish the correspondence, it is enough to check it when E is simple. In that case it follows from the connectivity of T and D and because:

- For x in E, Q(x) is a positive operator if and only if x or −x lies in C
- B(a*,a) is a positive operator if and only if a or its inverse (if invertible) lies in D

The first criterion follows from the fact that the eigenvalues of Q(x) are exactly λ_{i}λ_{j} if the eigenvalues of x are λ_{i}. So the λ_{i} are either all positive or all negative. The second criterion follows from the fact that if a = u Σ α_{i} e_{i} = ux with α_{i} ≥ 0 and u in Γ_{u}(E_{C}), then B(a*,a) = u*Q(1 − x^{2})u has eigenvalues (1 − α_{i}^{2})(1 − α_{j}^{2}). So the α_{i} are either all less than one or all greater than one.

The resolvent identity is a consequence of the following identity for a and b invertible

$$\displaystyle{Q(a)Q(a^{-1}+b^{-1})Q(b)=Q(a+b).}$$

In fact in this case the relations for a quadratic Jordan algebra imply

$$\displaystyle{R(a,b)=2Q(a)Q(a^{-1},b)=2Q(a,b^{-1})Q(b)}$$

so that

$$\displaystyle{B(a,b)=Q(a)Q(a^{-1}-b)=Q(b^{-1} -a)Q(b).}$$

The equality of the last two terms implies the identity, replacing b by −b^{−1}.

Now set a = 1 − x and b = 1 − y. The resolvent identity is a special case of the more following more general identity:

$$\displaystyle{Q(1-x)Q(C(x)+C(y))Q(1-y)=-4B(x,y).}$$

In fact

$$\displaystyle{C(x)+C(y)=-2i(1-a^{-1} -b^{-1}),}$$

so the identity is equivalent to

$$\displaystyle{Q(a)Q(1-a^{-1} -b^{-1})Q(b)=B(1-a,1-b).}$$

Using the identity above together with Q(c)L(c^{−1}) = L(c), the left hand side equals Q(a)Q(b) + Q(a + b) − 2L(a)Q(b) − 2Q(a)L(b). The right hand side equals 2L(a)L(b) + 2L(b)L(a) − 2L(ab) − 2L(a)Q(b) − 2Q(a)L(b) + Q(a)Q(b) + Q(a) + Q(b). These are equal because of the formula 1/2[Q(a + b) − Q(a) − Q(b)] = L(a)L(b) + L(b)L(a) − L(ab).

=== Automorphism group of bounded domain ===
The Möbius transformations in SU(1,1) carry the bounded domain D onto itself.

If a lies in the bounded domain D, then a − 1 is invertible. Since D is invariant under multiplication by scalars of modulus ≤ 1, it follows that a − λ is invertible for |λ| ≥ 1. Hence for ||a|| ≤ 1, a − λ is invertible for |λ| > 1. It follows that the Möbius transformation ga is defined for ||a|| ≤ 1 and g in SU(1,1). Where defined it is injective. It is holomorphic on D. By the maximum modulus principle, to show that g maps D onto D it suffices to show it maps S onto itself. For in that case g and its inverse preserve D so must be surjective. If u = e^{ix} with x = Σ ξ_{i}e_{i} in E, then gu lies in ⊕ C e_{i}. This is a commutative associative algebra and the spectral norm is the supremum norm. Since u = Σ ς_{i}e_{i} with |ς_{i}| = 1, it follows that gu = Σ g(ς_{i})e_{i} where |g(ς_{i})| = 1. So gu lies in S.

The unitary structure group of E_{C} carries D onto itself.

This is a direct consequence of the definition of the spectral norm.

The group of transformations SU(1,1)^{m} corresponding to a Jordan frame carries D onto itself.

This is already known for the Möbius transformations, i.e. the diagonal in SU(1,1)^{m}. It follows for diagonal matrices in a fixed component in SU(1,1)^{m} because they correspond to transformations in the unitary structure group. Conjugating by a Möbius transformation is equivalent to conjugation by a matrix in that component. Since the only non-trivial normal subgroup of SU(1,1) is its center, every matrix in a fixed component carries D onto itself.

D is a bounded symmetric domain.

Given an element in D an transformation in the identity component of the unitary structure group carries it in an element in ⊕ C e_{i} with supremum norm less than 1. An transformation in SU(1,1)^{m} the carries it onto zero. Thus there is a transitive group of biholomorphic transformations of D. The symmetry z ↦ −z is a biholomorphic Möbius transformation fixing only 0.

The biholomorphic mappings of D onto itself that fix the origin are given by the unitary structure group.

If f is a biholomorphic self-mapping of D with f(0) = 0 and derivative I at 0, then f must be the identity. If not, f has Taylor series expansion f(z) = z + f_{k} + f_{k + 1}(z) + ⋅⋅⋅ with f_{i} homogeneous of degree i and f_{k} ≠ 0. But then f^{n}(z) = z + n f_{k}(z). Let ψ be a functional in A* of norm one. Then for fixed z in D, the holomorphic functions of a complex variable w given by h_{n}(w) = ψ(f^{n}(wz)) must have modulus less than 1 for |w| < 1. By Cauchy's inequality, the coefficients of w^{k} must be uniformly bounded independent of n, which is not possible if f_{k} ≠ 0.

If g is a biholomorphic mapping of D onto itself just fixing 0 then if h(z) = e^{iα} z, the mapping f = g ∘ h ∘ g^{−1} ∘ h^{−α} fixes 0 and has derivative I there. It is therefore the identity map. So g(e^{iα} z) = e^{iα}g(z) for any α. This implies g is a linear mapping. Since it maps D onto itself it maps the closure onto itself. In particular it must map the Shilov boundary S onto itself. This forces g to be in the unitary structure group.

The group G_{D} of biholomorphic automorphisms of D is generated by the unitary structure group K_{D} and the Möbius transformations associated to a Jordan frame. If A_{D} denotes the subgroup of such Möbius transformations fixing ±1, then the Cartan decomposition formula holds: G_{D} = K_{D} A_{D} K_{D}.

The orbit of 0 under A_{D} is the set of all points Σ α_{i} e_{i} with −1 < α_{i} < 1. The orbit of these points under the unitary structure group is the whole of D. The Cartan decomposition follows because K_{D} is the stabilizer of 0 in G_{D}.

The center of G_{D} is trivial.

In fact the only point fixed by (the identity component of) K_{D} in D is 0. Uniqueness implies that the center of G_{D} must fix 0. It follows that the center of G_{D} lies in K_{D}. The center of K_{D} is isomorphic to the circle group: a rotation through θ corresponds to multiplication by e^{iθ} on D so lies in SU(1,1)/{±1}. Since this group has trivial center, the center of G_{D} is trivial.

K_{D} is a maximal compact subgroup of G_{D}.

In fact any larger compact subgroup would intersect A_{D} non-trivially and it has no non-trivial compact subgroups.

Note that G_{D} is a Lie group (see below), so that the above three statements hold with G_{D} and K_{D} replaced by their identity components, i.e. the subgroups generated by their one-parameter subgroups. Uniqueness of the maximal compact subgroup up to conjugacy follows from a general argument or can be deduced for classical domains directly using Sylvester's law of inertia following Sugiura (1982). For the example of Hermitian matrices over C, this reduces to proving that U(n) × U(n) is up to conjugacy the unique maximal compact subgroup in U(n,n). In fact if W = C^{n} ⊕ (0), then U(n) × U(n) is the subgroup of U(n,n) preserving W. The restriction of the hermitian form given by the inner product on W minus the inner product on (0) ⊕ C^{n}. On the other hand, if K is a compact subgroup of U(n,n), there is a K-invariant inner product on C^{2n} obtained by averaging any inner product with respect to Haar measure on K. The Hermitian form corresponds to an orthogonal decomposition into two subspaces of dimension n both invariant under K with the form positive definite on one and negative definite on the other. By Sylvester's law of inertia, given two subspaces of dimension n on which the Hermitian form is positive definite, one is carried onto the other by an element of U(n,n). Hence there is an element g of U(n,n) such that the positive definite subspace is given by gW. So gKg^{−1} leaves W invariant and gKg^{−1} ⊆ U(n) × U(n).

A similar argument, with quaternions replacing the complex numbers, shows uniqueness for the symplectic group, which corresponds to Hermitian matrices over R. This can also be seen more directly by using complex structures. A complex structure is an invertible operator J with J^{2} = −I preserving the symplectic form B and such that −B(Jx,y) is a real inner product. The symplectic group acts transitively on complex structures by conjugation. Moreover, the subgroup commuting with J is naturally identified with the unitary group for the corresponding complex inner product space. Uniqueness follows by showing that any compact subgroup K commutes with some complex structure J. In fact, averaging over Haar measure, there is a K-invariant inner product on the underlying space. The symplectic form yields an invertible skew-adjoint operator T commuting with K. The operator S = −T^{2} is positive, so has a unique positive square root, which commutes with K. So J = S^{−1/2}T, the phase of T, has square −I and commutes with K.

=== Automorphism group of tube domain ===
There is a Cartan decomposition for G_{T} corresponding to the action on the tube T = E + iC:

$$\displaystyle{G_T=K_T A_T K_T.}$$

- K_{T} is the stabilizer of i in iC ⊂ T, so a maximal compact subgroup of G_{T}. Under the Cayley transform, K_{T} corresponds to K_{D}, the stabilizer of 0 in the bounded symmetric domain, where it acts linearly. Since G_{T} is semisimple, every maximal compact subgroup is conjugate to K_{T}.
- The center of G_{T} or G_{D} is trivial. In fact the only point fixed by K_{D} in D is 0. Uniqueness implies that the center of G_{D} must fix 0. It follows that the center of G_{D} lies in K_{D} and hence that the center of G_{T} lies in K_{T}. The center of K_{D} is isomorphic to the circle group: a rotation through θ corresponds to multiplication by e^{iθ} on D. In Cayley transform it corresponds to the Möbius transformation z ↦ (cz + s)(−sz + c)^{−1} where c = cos θ/2 and s = sin θ/2. (In particular, when θ = π, this gives the symmetry j(z) = −z^{−1}.) In fact all Möbius transformations z ↦ (αz + β)(−γz + δ)^{−1} with αδ − βγ = 1 lie in G_{T}. Since PSL(2,R) has trivial center, the center of G_{T} is trivial.
- A_{T} is given by the linear operators Q(a) with a = Σ α_{i} e_{i} with α_{i} > 0.

In fact the Cartan decomposition for G_{T} follows from the decomposition for G_{D}. Given z in D, there is an element u in K_{D}, the identity component of Γ_{u}(E_{C}), such that z = u Σ α_{j}e_{j} with α_{j} ≥ 0. Since ||z|| < 1, it follows that α_{j} < 1. Taking the Cayley transform of z, it follows that every w in T can be written w = k∘ C Σ α_{j}e_{j}, with C the Cayley transform and k in K_{T}. Since C Σ α_{i}e_{i} = Σ β_{j}e_{j} i with β_{j} = (1 + α_{j})(1 − α_{j})^{−1}, the point w is of the form w =ka(i) with a in A. Hence G_{T} = K_{T}A_{T}K_{T}.

=== Iwasawa decomposition ===
There is an Iwasawa decomposition for G_{T} corresponding to the action on the tube T = E + iC:

$$\displaystyle{G_T=K_T A_T N_T.}$$

- K_{T} is the stabilizer of i in iC ⊂ T.
- A_{T} is given by the linear operators Q(a) where a = Σ α_{i} e_{i} with α_{i} > 0.
- N_{T} is a lower unitriangular group on E_{C}. It is the semidirect product of the unipotent triangular group N appearing in the Iwasawa decomposition of G (the symmetry group of C) and N_{0} = E, group of translations x ↦ x + b.

The group S = AN acts on E linearly and conjugation on N_{0} reproduces this action. Since the group S acts simply transitively on C, it follows that AN_{T}=S⋅N_{0} acts simply transitively on T = E + iC. Let H_{T} be the group of biholomorphisms of the tube T. The Cayley transform shows that is isomorphic to the group H_{D} of biholomorphisms of the bounded domain D. Since AN_{T} acts simply transitively on the tube T while K_{T} fixes ic, they have trivial intersection.

Given g in H_{T}, take s in AN_{T} such that g^{−1}(i)=s^{−1}(i). then gs^{−1} fixes i and therefore lies in K_{T}. Hence H_{T} = K_{T} ⋅A⋅N_{T}. So the product is a group.

=== Lie group structure ===
By a result of Henri Cartan, H_{D} is a Lie group. Cartan's original proof is presented in Narasimhan (1971). It can also be deduced from the fact the D is complete for the Bergman metric, for which the isometries form a Lie group; by Montel's theorem, the group of biholomorphisms is a closed subgroup.

That H_{T} is a Lie group can be seen directly in this case. In fact there is a finite-dimensional 3-graded Lie algebra $\mathfrak{g}_T$ of vector fields with an involution σ. The Killing form is negative definite on the +1 eigenspace of σ and positive definite on the −1 eigenspace. As a group H_{T} normalizes $\mathfrak{g}_T$ since the two subgroups K_{T} and AN_{T} do. The +1 eigenspace corresponds to the Lie algebra of K_{T}. Similarly the Lie algebras of the linear group AN and the affine group N_{0} lie in $\mathfrak{g}_T$. Since the group G_{T} has trivial center, the map into GL($\mathfrak{g}_T$) is injective. Since K_{T} is compact, its image in GL($\mathfrak{g}_T$) is compact. Since the Lie algebra $\mathfrak{g}_T$ is compatible with that of AN_{T}, the image of AN_{T} is closed. Hence the image of the product is closed, since the image of K_{T} is compact. Since it is a closed subgroup, it follows that H_{T} is a Lie group.

== Generalizations ==
Euclidean Jordan algebras can be used to construct Hermitian symmetric spaces of tube type. The remaining Hermitian symmetric spaces are Siegel domains of the second kind. They can be constructed using Euclidean Jordan triple systems, a generalization of Euclidean Jordan algebras. In fact for a Euclidean Jordan algebra E let

$$\displaystyle{L(a,b)=2([L(a),L(b)] + L(ab)).}$$

Then L(a,b) gives a bilinear map into End E such that

$$\displaystyle{L(a,b)^*=L(b,a)},\,\,\, L(a,b)c=L(c,b)a$$

and

$$\displaystyle{[L(a,b),L(c,d)]=L(L(a,b)c,d)-L(c,L(b,a)d).}$$

Any such bilinear system is called a Euclidean Jordan triple system. By definition the operators L(a,b) form a Lie subalgebra of End E.

The Kantor–Koecher–Tits construction gives a one-one correspondence between Jordan triple systems and 3-graded Lie algebras

$$\displaystyle{\mathfrak{g}=\mathfrak{g}_{-1}\oplus\mathfrak{g}_0\oplus\mathfrak{g}_1,}$$

satisfying

$$\displaystyle{[\mathfrak{g}_p,\mathfrak{g}_q]\subseteq \mathfrak{g}_{p+q}}$$

and equipped with an involutive automorphism σ reversing the grading. In this case

$$\displaystyle{L(a,b) = \mathrm{ad}\,[a,\sigma(b)]}$$

defines a Jordan triple system on $\mathfrak{g}_{-1}$. In the case of Euclidean Jordan algebras or triple systems the Kantor–Koecher–Tits construction can be identified with the Lie algebra of the Lie group of all homomorphic automorphisms of the corresponding bounded symmetric domain. The Lie algebra is constructed by taking $\mathfrak{g}_0$ to be the Lie subalgebra $\mathfrak{h}$ of End E generated by the L(a,b) and $\mathfrak{g}_{\pm 1}$ to be copies of E. The Lie bracket is given by

$$\displaystyle{[(a_1,T_1,b_1),(a_2,T_2,b_2)]=(T_1a_2-T_2a_1,[T_1,T_2]+L(a_1,b_2)-L(a_2,b_1),T_2^*b_1-T_1^*b_2)}$$

and the involution by

$$\displaystyle{\sigma(a,T,b)=(b,-T^*,a).}$$

The Killing form is given by

$$\displaystyle{B((a_1,T_1,b_1),(a_2,T_2,b_2))= (a_1,b_2) + (b_1,a_2) +  \beta(T_1,T_2),}$$

where β(T_{1},T_{2}) is the symmetric bilinear form defined by

$$\displaystyle{\beta(L(a,b),L(c,d))=(L(a,b)c,d)=(L(c,d)a,b).}$$

These formulas, originally derived for Jordan algebras, work equally well for Jordan triple systems. The account in Koecher (1969) develops the theory of bounded symmetric domains starting from the standpoint of 3-graded Lie algebras. For a given finite-dimensional vector space E, Koecher considers finite-dimensional Lie algebras $\mathfrak{g}$ of vector fields on E with polynomial coefficients of degree ≤ 2. $\mathfrak{g}_{-1}$ consists of the constant vector fields ∂_{i} and $\mathfrak{g}_{0}$ must contain the Euler operator H = Σ x_{i}⋅∂_{i} as a central element. Requiring the existence of an involution σ leads directly to a Jordan triple structure on V as above. As for all Jordan triple structures, fixing c in E, the operators L_{c}(a) = L(a,c) give E a Jordan algebra structure, determined by e. The operators L(a,b) themselves come from a Jordan algebra structure as above if and only if there are additional operators E_{±} in $\mathfrak{g}_{\pm 1}$ so that H, E_{±} give a copy of $\mathfrak{sl}_2$. The corresponding Weyl group element implements the involution σ. This case corresponds to that of Euclidean Jordan algebras.

The remaining cases are constructed uniformly by Koecher using involutions of simple Euclidean Jordan algebras. Let E be a simple Euclidean Jordan algebra and τ a Jordan algebra automorphism of E of period 2. Thus E = E_{+1} ⊕ E_{−1} has an eigenspace decomposition for τ with E_{+1} a Jordan subalgebra and E_{−1} a module. Moreover, a product of two elements in E_{−1} lies in E_{+1}. For a, b, c in E_{−1}, set

$$\displaystyle{L_0(a,b)c=L(a,b)c}$$

and (a,b)= Tr L(ab). Then F = E_{−1} is a simple Euclidean Jordan triple system, obtained by restricting the triple system on E to F. Koecher exhibits explicit involutions of simple Euclidean Jordan algebras directly (see below). These Jordan triple systems correspond to irreducible Hermitian symmetric spaces given by Siegel domains of the second kind. In Cartan's listing, their compact duals are SU(p + q)/S(U(p) × U(q)) with p ≠ q (AIII), SO(2n)/U(n) with n odd (DIII) and E_{6}/SO(10) × U(1) (EIII).

Examples

- F is the space of p by q matrices over R with p ≠ q. In this case L(a,b)c= ab^{t}c + cb^{t}a with inner product (a,b) = Tr ab^{t}. This is Koecher's construction for the involution on E = H_{p + q}(R) given by conjugating by the diagonal matrix with p digonal entries equal to 1 and q to −1.
- F is the space of real skew-symmetric m by m matrices. In this case L(a,b)c = abc + cba with inner product (a,b) = −Tr ab. After removing a factor of √(-1), this is Koecher's construction applied to complex conjugation on E = H_{n}(C).
- F is the direct sum of two copies of the Cayley numbers, regarded as 1 by 2 matrices. This triple system is obtained by Koecher's construction for the canonical involution defined by any minimal idempotent in E = H_{3}(O).

The classification of Euclidean Jordan triple systems has been achieved by generalizing the methods of Jordan, von Neumann and Wigner, but the proofs are more involved. Prior differential geometric methods of Kobayashi & Nagano (1964), invoking a 3-graded Lie algebra, and of Loos (1971), Loos (1985) lead to a more rapid classification.
