= Jordan operator algebra =

In mathematics, Jordan operator algebras are real or complex Jordan algebras with the compatible structure of a Banach space. When the coefficients are real numbers, the algebras are called Jordan Banach algebras. The theory has been extensively developed only for the subclass of JB algebras. The axioms for these algebras were devised by Alfsen, Shultz & Størmer (1978). Those that can be realised concretely as subalgebras of self-adjoint operators on a real or complex Hilbert space with the operator Jordan product and the operator norm are called JC algebras. The axioms for complex Jordan operator algebras, first suggested by Irving Kaplansky in 1976, require an involution and are called JB* algebras or Jordan C* algebras. By analogy with the abstract characterisation of von Neumann algebras as C* algebras for which the underlying Banach space is the dual of another, there is a corresponding definition of JBW algebras. Those that can be realised using ultraweakly closed Jordan algebras of self-adjoint operators with the operator Jordan product are called JW algebras. The JBW algebras with trivial center, so-called JBW factors, are classified in terms of von Neumann factors: apart from the exceptional 27 dimensional Albert algebra and the spin factors, all other JBW factors are isomorphic either to the self-adjoint part of a von Neumann factor or to its fixed point algebra under a period two *-anti-automorphism. Jordan operator algebras have been applied in quantum mechanics and in complex geometry, where Koecher's description of bounded symmetric domains using Jordan algebras has been extended to infinite dimensions.

== Definitions ==
=== JC algebra ===
A JC algebra is a real subspace of the space of self-adjoint operators on a real or complex Hilbert space, closed under the operator Jordan product a ∘ b = 1/2(ab + ba) and closed in the operator norm.

=== Jordan operator algebra ===
A Jordan operator algebra is a norm-closed subspace of the space of operators on a complex Hilbert space, closed under the Jordan product a ∘ b = 1/2(ab + ba) and closed in the operator norm.

=== Jordan Banach algebra ===
A Jordan Banach algebra is a real Jordan algebra with a norm making it a Banach space and satisfying || a ∘ b || ≤ ||a||⋅||b||.

=== JB algebra ===
A JB algebra is a Jordan Banach algebra satisfying

$$\displaystyle{\|a^2\|=\|a\|^2,\,\,\, \|a^2\| \le \|a^2 + b^2\|.}$$

=== JB* algebras ===
A JB* algebra or Jordan C* algebra is a complex Jordan algebra with an involution a ↦ a* and a norm making it a Banach space and satisfying

- ||a ∘ b || ≤ ||a||⋅||b||
- ||a*|| = ||a||
- ||{a,a*,a}|| = ||a||^{3} where the Jordan triple product is defined by {a,b,c} = (a ∘ b) ∘ c + (c ∘ b) ∘ a − (a ∘ c) ∘ b.

=== JW algebras ===
A JW algebra is a Jordan subalgebra of the Jordan algebra of self-adjoint operators on a complex Hilbert space that is closed in the weak operator topology.

=== JBW algebras ===
A JBW algebra is a JB algebra that, as a real Banach space, is the dual of a Banach space called its predual. There is an equivalent more technical definition in terms of the continuity properties of the linear functionals in the predual, called normal functionals. This is usually taken as the definition and the abstract characterization as a dual Banach space derived as a consequence.

- For the order structure on a JB algebra (defined below), any increasing net of operators bounded in norm should have a least upper bound.
- Normal functionals are those that are continuous on increasing bounded nets of operators. Positive normal functional are those that are non-negative on positive operators.
- For every non-zero operator, there is a positive normal functional that does not vanish on that operator.

== Properties of JB algebras ==
- If a unital JB algebra is associative, then its complexification with its natural involution is a commutative C* algebra. It is therefore isomorphic to C(X) for a compact Hausdorff space X, the space of characters of the algebra.
- Spectral theorem. If a is a single operator in a JB algebra, the closed subalgebra generated by 1 and a is associative. It can be identified with the continuous real-valued functions on the spectrum of a, the set of real λ for which a − λ1 is not invertible.
- The positive elements in a unital JB algebra are those with spectrum contained in [0,∞). By the spectral theorem, they coincide with the space of squares and form a closed convex cone. If b ≥ 0, then {a,b,a} ≥ 0.
- A JB algebra is a formally real Jordan algebra: if a sum of squares of terms is zero, then each term is zero. In finite dimensions, a JB algebra is isomorphic to a Euclidean Jordan algebra.
- The spectral radius on a JB algebra defines an equivalent norm also satisfying the axioms for a JB algebra.
- A state on a unital JB algebra is a bounded linear functional f such that f(1) = 1 and f is non-negative on the positive cone. The state space is a convex set closed in the weak* topology. The extreme points are called pure states. Given a there is a pure state f such that |f(a)| = ||a||.
- Gelfand–Naimark–Segal construction: If a JB algebra is isomorphic to the self-adjoint n by n matrices with coefficients in some associative unital *-algebra, then it is isometrically isomorphic to a JC algebra. The JC algebra satisfies the additional condition that (T + T*)/2 lies in the algebra whenever T is a product of operators from the algebra.
- A JB algebra is purely exceptional if it has no non-zero Jordan homomorphism onto a JC algebra. The only simple algebra that can arise as the homomorphic image of a purely exceptional JB algebra is the Albert algebra, the 3 by 3 self-adjoint matrices over the octonions.
- Every JB algebra has a uniquely determined closed ideal that is purely exceptional, and such that the quotient by the ideal is a JC algebra.
- Shirshov–Cohn theorem. A JB algebra generated by 2 elements is a JC algebra.

== Properties of JB* algebras ==
The definition of JB* algebras was suggested in 1976 by Irving Kaplansky at a lecture in Edinburgh. The real part of a JB* algebra is always a JB algebra. Wright (1977) proved that conversely the complexification of every JB algebra is a JB* algebra. JB* algebras have been used extensively as a framework for studying bounded symmetric domains in infinite dimensions. This generalizes the theory in finite dimensions developed by Max Koecher using the complexification of a Euclidean Jordan algebra.

== Properties of JBW algebras ==
=== Elementary properties ===
- The Kaplansky density theorem holds for real unital Jordan algebras of self-adjoint operators on a Hilbert space with the operator Jordan product. In particular a Jordan algebra is closed in the weak operator topology if and only if it is closed in the ultraweak operator topology. The two topologies coincide on the Jordan algebra.
- For a JBW algebra, the space of positive normal functionals is invariant under the quadratic representation Q(a)b = {a,b,a}. If f is positive so is f ∘ Q(a).
- The weak topology on a JW algebra M is define by the seminorms |f(a)| where f is a normal state; the strong topology is defined by the seminorms |f(a^{2})|^{1/2}. The quadratic representation and Jordan product operators L(a)b = a ∘ b are continuous operators on M for both the weak and strong topology.
- An idempotent p in a JBW algebra M is called a projection. If p is a projection, then Q(p)M is a JBW algebra with identity p.
- If a is any element of a JBW algebra, the smallest weakly closed unital subalgebra it generates is associative and hence the self-adjoint part of an Abelian von Neumann algebra. In particular a can be approximated in norm by linear combinations of orthogonal projections.
- The projections in a JBW algebra are closed under lattice operations. Thus for a family p_{α} there is a smallest projection p such that p ≥ p_{α} and a largest projection q such that q ≤ p_{α}.
- The center of a JBW algebra M consists of all z such L(z) commutes with L(a) for a in M. It is an associative algebra and the real part of an Abelian von Neumann algebra. A JBW algebra is called a factor if its center consists of scalar operators.
- If A is a JB algebra, its second dual A** is a JBW algebra. The normal states are states in A* and can be identified with states on A. Moreover, A** is the JBW algebra generated by A.
- A JB algebra is a JBW algebra if and only if, as a real Banach space, it is the dual of a Banach space. This Banach space, its predual, is the space of normal functionals, defined as differences of positive normal functionals. These are the functionals continuous for the weak or strong topologies. As a consequence the weak and strong topologies coincide on a JBW algebra.
- In a JBW algebra, the JBW algebra generated by a Jordan subalgebra coincides with its weak closure. Moreover, an extension of the Kaplansky density theorem holds: the unit ball of the subalgebra is weakly dense in the unit ball of the JBW algebra it generates.
- Tomita–Takesaki theory has been extended by Haagerup & Hanche-Olsen (1984) to normal states of a JBW algebra that are faithful, i.e. do not vanish on any non-zero positive operator. The theory can be deduced from the original theory for von Neumann algebras.

=== Comparison of projections ===
Let M be a JBW factor. The inner automorphisms of M are those generated by the period two automorphisms Q(1 – 2p) where p is a projection. Two projections are equivalent if there is an inner automorphism carrying one onto the other. Given two projections in a factor, one of them is always equivalent to a sub-projection of the other. If each is equivalent to a sub-projection of the other, they are equivalent.

A JBW factor can be classified into three mutually exclusive types as follows:

- It is type I if there is a minimal projection. It is type I_{n} if 1 can be written as a sum of n orthogonal minimal projections for 1 ≤ n ≤ ∞.
- It is Type II if there are no minimal projections but the subprojections of some fixed projections e form a modular lattice, i.e. p ≤ q implies (p ∨ r) ∧ q = p ∨ (r ∧ q) for any projection r ≤ e. If e can be taken to be 1, it is Type II_{1}. Otherwise it is type II_{≈}.
- It is Type III if the projections do not form a modular lattice. All non-zero projections are then equivalent.

Tomita–Takesaki theory permits a further classification of the type III case into types III_{λ} (0 ≤ λ ≤ 1) with the additional invariant of an ergodic flow on a Lebesgue space (the "flow of weights") when λ = 0.

=== Classification of JBW factors of Type I ===
- The JBW factor of Type I_{1} is the real numbers.
- The JBW factors of Type I_{2} are the spin factors. Let H be a real Hilbert space of dimension greater than 1. Set M = H ⊕ R with inner product (u⊕λ,v⊕μ) =(u,v) + λμ and product (u⊕λ)∘(v⊕μ)=( μu + λv) ⊕ [(u,v) + λμ]. With the operator norm ||L(a)||, M is a JBW factor and also a JW factor.
- The JBW factors of Type I_{3} are the self-adjoint 3 by 3 matrices with entries in the real numbers, the complex numbers or the quaternions or the octonions.
- The JBW factors of Type I_{n} with 4 ≤ n < ∞ are the self-adjoint n by n matrices with entries in the real numbers, the complex numbers or the quaternions.
- The JBW factors of Type I_{∞} are the self-adjoint operators on an infinite-dimensional real, complex or quaternionic Hilbert space. The quaternionic space is defined as all sequences x = (x_{i}) with x_{i} in H and Σ |x_{i}|^{2} < ∞. The H-valued inner product is given by (x,y) = Σ (y_{i})*x_{i}. There is an underlying real inner product given by (x,y)_{R} = Re (x,y). The quaternionic JBW factor of Type I_{∞} is thus the Jordan algebra of all self-adjoint operators on this real inner product space that commute with the action of right multiplication by H.

=== Classification of JBW factors of Types II and III ===
The JBW factors not of Type I_{2} and I_{3} are all JW factors, i.e. can be realized as Jordan algebras of self-adjoint operators on a Hilbert space closed in the weak operator topology. Every JBW factor not of Type I_{2} or Type I_{3} is isomorphic to the self-adjoint part of the fixed point algebra of a period 2 *-anti-automorphism of a von Neumann algebra. In particular each JBW factor is either isomorphic to the self-adjoint part of a von Neumann factor of the same type or to the self-adjoint part of the fixed point algebra of a period 2 *-anti-automorphism of a von Neumann factor of the same type. For hyperfinite factors, the class of von Neumann factors completely classified by Connes and Haagerup, the period 2 *-antiautomorphisms have been classified up to conjugacy in the automorphism group of the factor.

== See also ==
- Jordan algebra
- Euclidean Jordan algebra
