= Koecher–Vinberg theorem =

Theorem of operator algebra

In operator algebra, the Koecher–Vinberg theorem is a reconstruction theorem for real Jordan algebras. It was proved independently by Max Koecher in 1957 and Ernest Vinberg in 1961. It provides a one-to-one correspondence between formally real Jordan algebras and so-called domains of positivity. Thus it links operator algebraic and convex order theoretic views on state spaces of physical systems.

== Statement ==
A convex cone $C$ is called regular if $a=0$ whenever both $a$ and $-a$ are in the closure $\overline{C}$.

A convex cone $C$ in a vector space $A$ with an inner product has a dual cone $C^* = \{ a \in A : \forall b \in C \langle a,b\rangle > 0 \}$. The cone is called self-dual when $C=C^*$. It is called homogeneous when to any two points $a,b \in C$ there is a real linear transformation $T \colon A \to A$ that restricts to a bijection $C \to C$ and satisfies $T(a)=b$.

The Koecher–Vinberg theorem now states that these properties precisely characterize the positive cones of Jordan algebras.

Theorem: There is a one-to-one correspondence between formally real Jordan algebras and convex cones that are:

- open;
- regular;
- homogeneous;
- self-dual.

Convex cones satisfying these four properties are called domains of positivity or symmetric cones. The domain of positivity associated with a real Jordan algebra $A$ is the interior of the 'positive' cone $A_+ = \{ a^2 \colon a \in A \}$.

== Proof ==
For a proof, see Koecher (1999) or Faraut & Koranyi (1994).
