= Ernest Vinberg =

Russian mathematician (1937–2020)

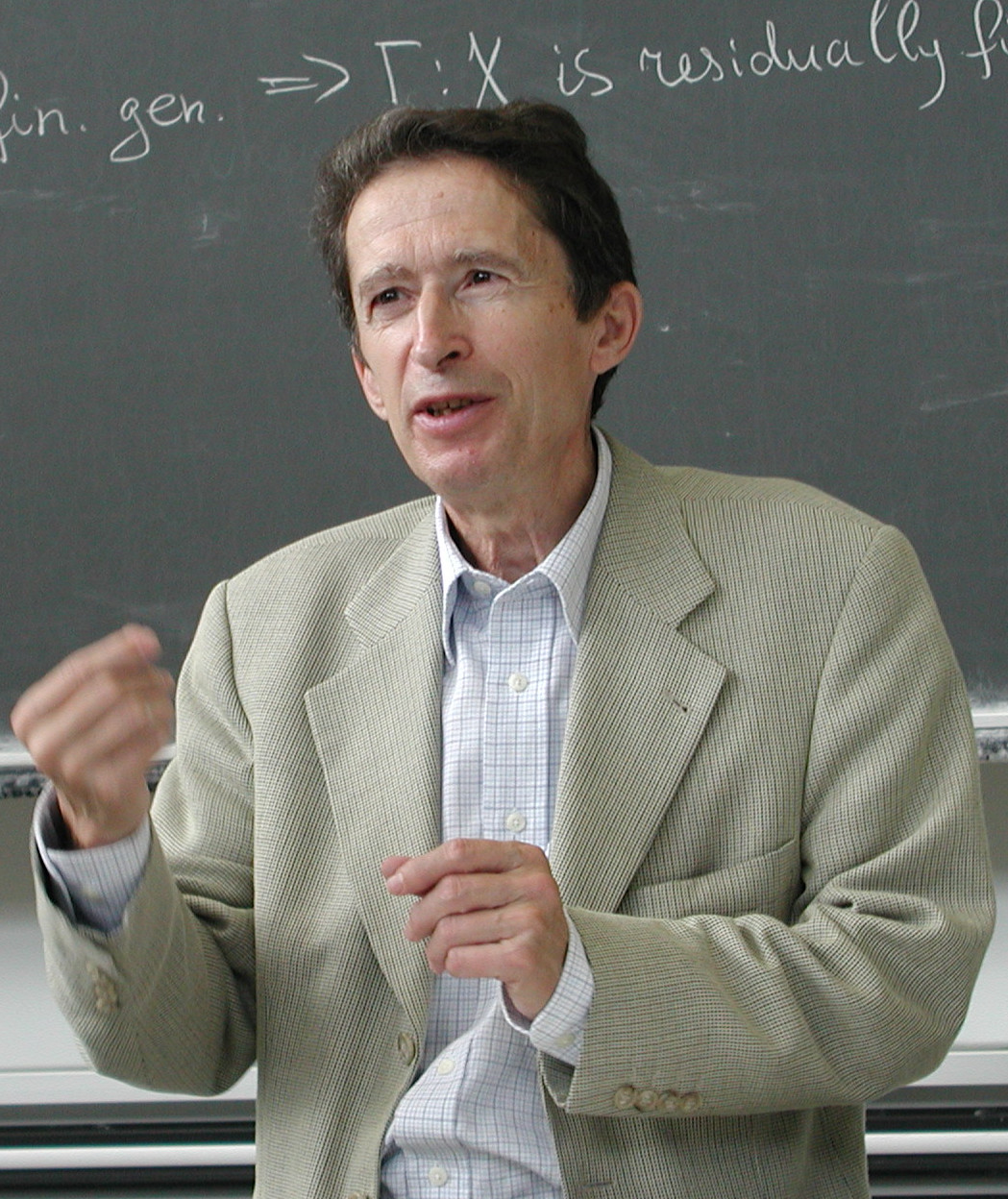
- Vinberg in 2001
- Born: Ernest Borisovich Vinberg; 26 July 1937; Moscow, Russian RSFSR, Soviet Union
- Died: 12 May 2020 (aged 82); Moscow, Russia
- Education: Moscow State University
- Known for: Vinberg's algorithm Koecher–Vinberg theorem
- Awards: Moscow Mathematical Society Prize (1963); Humboldt Prize (1997); Life Dedicated to Mathematics (2014)
- Scientific career
- Fields: Mathematics
- Workplaces: Moscow State University
- Doctoral advisor: Eugene Dynkin; Ilya Piatetski-Shapiro
- Doctoral students: Victor Kac; Ivan Losev; Boris Weisfeiler

Ernest Borisovich Vinberg (Russian: Эрне́ст Бори́сович Ви́нберг; 26 July 1937 – 12 May 2020) was a Soviet and Russian mathematician, who worked on Lie groups and algebraic groups, discrete subgroups of Lie groups, invariant theory, and representation theory. He introduced Vinberg's algorithm and the Koecher–Vinberg theorem.

He was a recipient of the 1997 Humboldt Prize. He was on the executive committee of the Moscow Mathematical Society. In 1983, he was an Invited Speaker with a talk on Discrete reflection groups in Lobachevsky spaces at the International Congress of Mathematicians in Warsaw. In 2010, he was elected an International Honorary Member of the American Academy of Arts and Sciences.

Ernest Vinberg died from pneumonia caused by COVID-19 on 12 May 2020. His ashes were interred in the columbarium at Vagankovo Cemetery.

== Selected publications ==
- Linear Representations of Groups. Basler Lehrbücher. Vol. 2. Translated by A. Iacob. Birkhäuser. 1989. ISBN 3-7643-2288-8.
- A Course in Algebra. Graduate Studies in Mathematics. Vol. 56. Translated by Alexander Retakh. American Mathematical Society. 2003. ISBN 0-8218-3413-4.
- editor and co-author: Lie Groups and Invariant Theory. Advances in the Mathematical Sciences. Vol. 56. American Mathematical Society. 2005. ISBN 0-8218-3733-8. (contains Construction of the exceptional simple Lie algebras)
- with A. L. Onishchik: Lie Groups and Algebraic Groups. Springer Series in Soviet Mathematics. Springer-Verlag. 1990. ISBN 978-0-387-50614-2. 2012 pbk edition
- with V. V. Gorbatsevich, A. L. Onishchik: Foundations of Lie Theory and Lie Transformation Groups. Translated by A. Kozlowski. Springer. 1997. ISBN 978-3-642-57999-8.
- Vinberg, E. B. (28 February 1985). "Hyperbolic reflection groups". Russian Mathematical Surveys. 40 (1): 31–75. Bibcode:1985RuMaS..40...31V. doi:10.1070/RM1985v040n01ABEH003527. S2CID 250912767.
- (ed.) Geometry II: Spaces of Constant Curvature. Encyclopedia of Mathematical Sciences. Vol. 29. Springer. 1993. doi:10.1007/978-3-662-02901-5. ISBN 978-3-642-08086-9. (contains: Vinberg et alia: Geometry of spaces of constant curvature, Discrete groups of motions of spaces of constant curvature)
