= Hans Maass =

German mathematician (1911–1992)

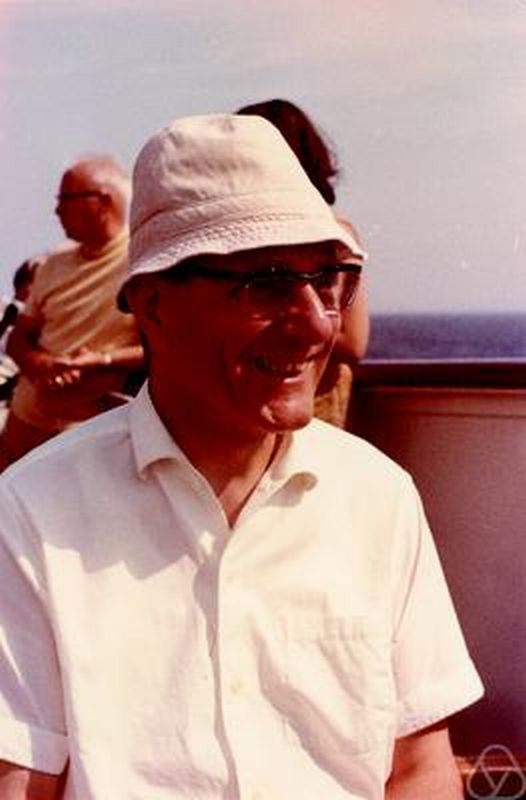
Hans Maass (1969)

Hans Maass (German: Hans Maaß; June 17, 1911, in Hamburg – April 15, 1992) was a German mathematician who introduced Maass wave forms (Maass 1949) and Koecher–Maass series (Maass 1950) and Maass–Selberg relations and who proved most of the Saito–Kurokawa conjecture. Maass was a student of Erich Hecke.

Maaß was primarily concerned with the theory of modular forms, being influenced in particular by Carl Ludwig Siegel (according to Maaß in his inaugural address for admission to the Heidelberg Academy, he met him in the early 1950s), whose Gesammelte Werke he also co-edited with K. S. Chandrasekharan, in addition to Hecke and Hans Petersson, Hecke's assistant, who suggested the topic of his dissertation. He became known for his introduction of non-analytic automorphic forms in the 1940s (Maaß waveforms). Instead of satisfying Laplace's equation (as analytic functions do), they are eigenfunctions of the invariant Laplace operator; Maaß therefore called them waveforms. Internationally, these forms are known by his name. The motivation for the introduction came in part from Maaß's interest in connections of the theory of modular forms to number theory. Maaß was also concerned with automorphic functions in several variables, Siegel modular functions, and associated zeta functions.

== Publications ==
- Maass, Hans (1949), "Über eine neue Art von nichtanalytischen automorphen Funktionen und die Bestimmung Dirichletscher Reihen durch Funktionalgleichungen", Mathematische Annalen, 121: 141–183, doi:10.1007/BF01329622, ISSN 0025-5831, MR 0031519, S2CID 119494842
- Maass, H. (1949), "Automorphe Funktionen von mehreren Veranderlichen und Dirichletsche Reihen", Abhandlungen aus dem Mathematischen Seminar der Universität Hamburg 16:72–100.
- Maass, Hans (1950), "Modulformen zweiten Grades und Dirichletreihen", Mathematische Annalen, 122: 90–108, doi:10.1007/BF01342953, ISSN 0025-5831, MR 0037870, S2CID 121901325
- Maass, Hans (1955), On Siegel's Modular Functions (PDF), Tata Institute of Fundamental Research Lectures on Mathematics, vol. 3
- Maass, Hans (1964), Lal, Sunder (ed.), Lectures on modular functions of one complex variable (PDF), Tata Institute of Fundamental Research Lectures on Mathematics, vol. 29, Bombay: Tata Institute of Fundamental Research, ISBN 978-3-540-12874-8, MR 0218305
- Maass, Hans (1971), Siegel's Modular Forms and Dirichlet Series, Lecture Notes in Mathematics, vol. 216, Berlin, New York: Springer-Verlag, doi:10.1007/BFb0058625, ISBN 978-3-540-05563-1, MR 0344198
