= Koecher–Maass series =

In mathematics, a Koecher–Maass series is a type of Dirichlet series that can be expressed as a Mellin transform of a Siegel modular form, generalizing Hecke's method of associating a Dirichlet series to a modular form using Mellin transforms. They were introduced by Max Koecher and Hans Maass.
