= Admissible algebra =

In mathematics, an admissible algebra is a (possibly non-associative) commutative algebra whose enveloping Lie algebra of derivations splits into the sum of an even and an odd part. Admissible algebras were introduced by Koecher (1967).
