= Max Koecher =

German mathematician (1924–1990)

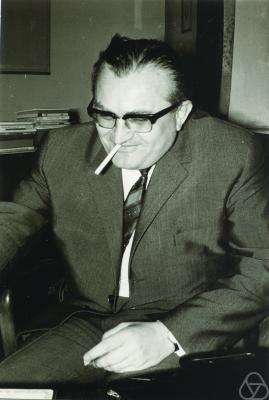
Max Koecher in Munich, 1967

Max Koecher (German: [ˈkœçɐ]; 20 January 1924 in Weimar – 7 February 1990, Lengerich) was a German mathematician.

== Biography ==
Koecher studied mathematics and physics at the University of Göttingen. In 1951, he received his doctorate under Max Deuring with his work (Koecher 1953) on Dirichlet series with functional equation where he introduced Koecher–Maass series. He qualified in 1954 at the University of Münster. From 1962 to 1970, Koecher was department chair at LMU Munich. He retired in 1989.

His main research area was the theory of Jordan algebras, where he introduced the Kantor–Koecher–Tits construction and the Koecher–Vinberg theorem, and introduced the concept of an admissible algebra. He discovered the Koecher boundedness principle in the theory of Siegel modular forms
