= Eisenstein integral =

In mathematical representation theory, the Eisenstein integral is an integral introduced by Harish-Chandra in the representation theory of semisimple Lie groups, analogous to Eisenstein series in the theory of automorphic forms. Harish-Chandra used Eisenstein integrals to decompose the regular representation of a semisimple Lie group into representations induced from parabolic subgroups. Trombi gave a survey of Harish-Chandra's work on this.

== Definition ==
Harish-Chandra defined the Eisenstein integral by

$$\displaystyle E(P:\psi:\nu:x) = \int_K\psi(xk)\tau(k^{-1})\exp((i\nu-\rho_P)H_P(xk)) \, dk$$

where:

- x is an element of a semisimple group G
- P = MAN is a cuspidal parabolic subgroup of G
- ν is an element of the complexification of a
- a is the Lie algebra of A in the Langlands decomposition P = MAN.
- K is a maximal compact subgroup of G, with G = KP.
- ψ is a cuspidal function on M, satisfying some extra conditions
- τ is a finite-dimensional unitary double representation of K
- H_{P}(x) = log a where x = kman is the decomposition of x in G = KMAN.
