= Ivan Losev (mathematician) =

- Іван Вадзімавіч Лосеў
- Born: 18 October 1981; Minsk, Byelorussian Soviet Socialist Republic, Soviet Union
- Education: PhD: Moscow State University
- Alma mater: Belarusian State University
- Scientific career
- Fields: Algebraic geometry; Combinatoric algebra; Representation theory; Symplectic geometry

Ivan Vadzimavich Loseu (publishing under the name Ivan Losev; Belarusian Іван Вадзімавіч Лосеў, Russian Иван Вадимович Лосев, born 18 October 1981 in Minsk, Belarus) is a Belarusian-American mathematician, specializing in representation theory, symplectic geometry, algebraic geometry, and combinatorial algebra.

== Education and career ==
Losev matriculated in 1999 at Belarusian State University, where he graduated in 2004 with an M.Sc. from the Department of Applied Mathematics and Computer Science. From 2004 to 2007 he was a graduate student in the Department of Mechanics and Mathematics, Moscow State University. There in 2007 he received his Ph.D. (Candidate of Sciences) with thesis Classification of some coisotropic actions of algebraic groups and advisor E. B. Vinberg. As a postdoc Losev was from 2007 to 2008 an engineer-programmer at Belarusian State University and from 2008 to 2011 a C.L.E. Moore Instructor at Massachusetts Institute of Technology. At Northeastern University he was from 2011 to 2015 an associate professor and from 2015 to 2018 a full professor. He was a full professor from 2018 to 2019 at the University of Toronto and is since 2019 a full professor at Yale University.

Losev has given talks at many conferences and workshops, has served as a referee for several academic journals, and is a member of the editorial boards of the journals Transformation Groups, Selecta Mathematica, and the Journal of Combinatorial Algebra. In 2017 he was elected a fellow (of the class of 2018) of the American Mathematical Society with a citation for "contributions to geometric representation theory, noncommutative algebra, and the theory of categorification." In 2010 in Hyderabad he was an invited speaker with talk, Finite W-algebras at the International Congress of Mathematicians.

== Selected publications ==
- Losev, I V (2006). "Symplectic slices for actions of reductive groups". Sbornik: Mathematics. 197 (2): 213–224. doi:10.1070/SM2006v197n02ABEH003754. ISSN 1468-4802. S2CID 250919141.
- Losev, Ivan V. (2009). "Uniqueness property for spherical homogeneous spaces". Duke Mathematical Journal. 147 (2): 315–343. arXiv:math/0703543. doi:10.1215/00127094-2009-013. S2CID 14514632. arXiv print
- Losev, Ivan (2010). "Quantized symplectic actions and $W$-algebras". Journal of the American Mathematical Society. 23 (1): 35–59. arXiv:0707.3108. doi:10.1090/S0894-0347-09-00648-1. ISSN 0894-0347.
- Losev, Ivan V. (2010). "Computation of Weyl groups of $G$-varieties". Representation Theory. 14 (2): 9–69. arXiv:math/0612559. doi:10.1090/S1088-4165-10-00365-1. ISSN 1088-4165.
- Losev, Ivan (2011). "Finite-dimensional representations of $W$-algebras". Duke Mathematical Journal. 159 (1): 99–143. arXiv:0807.1023. doi:10.1215/00127094-1384800. S2CID 15318762. arXiv preprint
- Losev, Ivan (2011). "1-Dimensional representations and parabolic induction for $W$-algebras". Advances in Mathematics. 226 (6): 4841–4883. arXiv:0906.0157. doi:10.1016/j.aim.2010.12.021. ISSN 0001-8708. S2CID 15770557.
- Losev, Ivan (2012). "Isomorphisms of quantizations via quantization of resolutions". Advances in Mathematics. 231 (3–4): 1216–1270. arXiv:1010.3182. doi:10.1016/j.aim.2012.06.017. ISSN 0001-8708.
- Gordon, Iain; Losev, Ivan (2014). "On category $O$ for cyclotomic rational Cherednik algebras". Journal of the European Mathematical Society. 16: 1017–1079. arXiv:1109.2315. doi:10.4171/JEMS/454.
- Etingof, Pavel; Gorsky, Eugene; Losev, Ivan (2015). "Representations of rational Cherednik algebras with minimal support and torus knots". Advances in Mathematics. 277: 124–180. arXiv:1304.3412. doi:10.1016/j.aim.2015.03.003. ISSN 0001-8708.
