= Kant (disambiguation) =

Immanuel Kant (1724–1804) was a German philosopher.

Kant may also refer to:

== Places ==
- Kant, Shahjahanpur, Uttar Pradesh, India, a town and nagar panchayat
- Kant, Kyrgyzstan, a city
  - Kant Air Base, a Russian base near the city
- 7083 Kant, an asteroid
- Kant (crater), a lunar crater

== Other uses ==
- Kant (book), a book by Roger Scruton
- Kant (surname), a list of people and fictional characters
- KANT (FM), a radio station in Gurnsey, Wyoming, United States
- KANT (software), a computer algebra system for mathematicians interested in algebraic number theory
- KANT project, a German-French joint venture for tank construction
- Immanuel Kant Baltic Federal University, a university in Kaliningrad
- FC Kant, a football club based in Kant, Kyrgyzstan
- Kant Hotel, Bryant, South Dakota, United States, on the National Register of Historic Places
- "Serving" (song), a 2025 song by Miriana Conte, originally titled "Kant"

== See also ==
- Cant (disambiguation)
- Kante (disambiguation)
- Kanth (disambiguation)
- Kanti (disambiguation)
