= Kant (surname) =

The surname Kant is borne by multiple people, some of which include the following:

== People ==
- Agnes Kant (born 1967), Dutch politician
- Elaine Kant, American computer scientist
- Farida Kant, Italian drag queen
- Hari Kant (born 1969), Canadian field hockey player
- Hermann Kant (1926–2016), German writer
- Immanuel Kant (1724–1804), German philosopher
- Krishan Kant (1927–2002), Vice President of India
- Lewis Kant (born 1952), Mexican artist and writer
- Rama Kant (1931–1991), Indian author
- Surya Kant (born 1962), Indian judge
- Surya Kant (businessman), Senior Advisor at Tata Sons Private Limited

== Fictional characters ==
- Eva Kant, Italian comic book character
- Shantanu Kant, one of the protagonists of Bahu Hamari Rajni Kant, an Indian TV series

== See also ==
- Cant (surname)
- Kante (surname)
