= Caunt =

Caunt is a surname. Notable people with the surname include:

- Ben Caunt (1815–1861), English bare-knuckle boxer
- Frederic Caunt (1859–1933), English Archdeacon of Saint Kitts

== See also ==
- Cant (surname)
