= Ganter =

Ganter may refer to:

- Ganter (surname)
- Ganter Brewery, Freiburg, Germany

== Ships ==
- SS Ganter, a German cargo ship in service from 1927 to 1939
- SS Ganter, a military transport of Germania, built in 1943, captured and transferred to the Black Sea Shipping Company

== See also ==
- Canter (disambiguation)
