= Canter (disambiguation) =

A canter is a three-beat gait performed by horses.

Canter may also refer to:

- Canter rhythm and waltz
- Canter (surname)
- Mitsubishi Fuso Canter, commercial vehicle
- Canter's, a deli in Los Angeles, California
- A slang term used to refer to the city of Canterbury
- "Canter" (song), a 2019 song by Gerry Cinnamon

== See also ==
- Cant (disambiguation)
- Cantor (disambiguation)
- Ganter (disambiguation)
