= Kakerbeck (Wittingen) =

- Ortsteil of Wittingen
- Interactive map of Kakerbeck
- Location within Germany Location within Lower Saxony
- Coordinates: 52°44′53″N 10°42′30″E
- Country: Germany
- State: Lower Saxony
- District: Gifhorn
- Town: Wittingen

Area
  - Total: 3.43 km^{2} (1.32 sq mi)
- Elevation: 83 m (272 ft)

Population (2017-12-31)
  - Total: 135
  - Density: 39.4/km^{2} (102/sq mi)
- Time zone: UTC+01:00 (CET)
  - Summer (DST): UTC+02:00 (CEST)
- Postal codes: 29378
- Dialling codes: 05831

The village of Kakerbeck lies in the north German state of Lower Saxony in the district of Gifhorn. It is a village in the town of Wittingen.

Kakerbeck is a rundling village originally probably five farmsteads. Around 100 people live in Kakerbeck today in 29 houses.

== Location ==
The parish lies in the district of Gifhorn south of Wittingen on lightly rolling loess terrain. The village lies on a gentle, southwest-facing slope.

== History ==
Kakerbeck was first documented in the monastery charter of 3 June 1243. However, Kakerbeck is one of the -beke settlements, the origin of which generally belongs to the older clearances period, 500-800 A.D., so may be considered of that.

In the course of the municipal area reform in Lower Saxony, the independent municipality of Kakerbeck was incorporated into the borough of Wittingen on 1 March 1974.

In 1993 the village celebrated its 750th anniversary.
