= Cant (disambiguation) =

Cant is the jargon or language of a group, often employed to exclude or mislead people outside the group.

Cant, CANT or canting may also refer to:

== Language ==
- Can't, the negative modal of possibility in English
- Canting arms, heraldic puns on the bearer's name

== Languages ==
- Beurla Reagaird, spoken by Scottish Highland Travellers
- Cantonese (Cant.), spoken in southern China
- Scottish Cant, spoken by Scottish Lowland Travellers
- Shelta, spoken by Irish Travellers
- Thieves' cant, spoken by British criminals

== People ==
- Cant (surname), a family name and list of people so named
- Chris Taylor (Grizzly Bear musician) (stage name: CANT)
- University of Canterbury, New Zealand, post-nominally

== Transport ==
- CANT (aviation), an Italian aircraft manufacturer (1923–1944; Cantieri Aeronautici e Navali Triestini)
- Cant (road and rail), the slope across road or track

== Other uses ==
- Cant (architecture), part of a facade
- Cant (log), a log partially processed in a sawmill
- Cant (shooting), tilting a gun around the longitudinal axis
- Canticle, a Christian song of praise
- Canting, a tool used in batik dyeing

== See also ==
- Canté, a commune in Ariège, France
- Canticle
- Canter (disambiguation)
- Kant (disambiguation)
- Kante (disambiguation)
