= Kanth =

Kanth may refer to:

- Kanth, Moradabad, a municipality in Uttar Pradesh, India
- Kanth (Assembly constituency) in Uttar Pradesh, India
- The German name of Kąty Wrocławskie, a town in Poland
- Kanth (surname)

== See also ==
- Kant (disambiguation)
