= Ohrdorf =

- Ortsteil of Wittingen
- Interactive map of Ohrdorf
- Location within Germany Location within Lower Saxony
- Coordinates: 52°41′52″N 10°48′30″E
- Country: Germany
- State: Lower Saxony
- District: Gifhorn
- Town: Wittingen

Area
  - Total: 12.43 km^{2} (4.80 sq mi)
- Elevation: 80 m (260 ft)

Population (2017-12-31)
  - Total: 397
  - Density: 31.9/km^{2} (82.7/sq mi)
- Time zone: UTC+01:00 (CET)
  - Summer (DST): UTC+02:00 (CEST)
- Postal codes: 29378
- Dialling codes: 05839

The village of Ohrdorf lies in the north German state of Lower Saxony in the district of Gifhorn and belongs to the town of Wittingen.

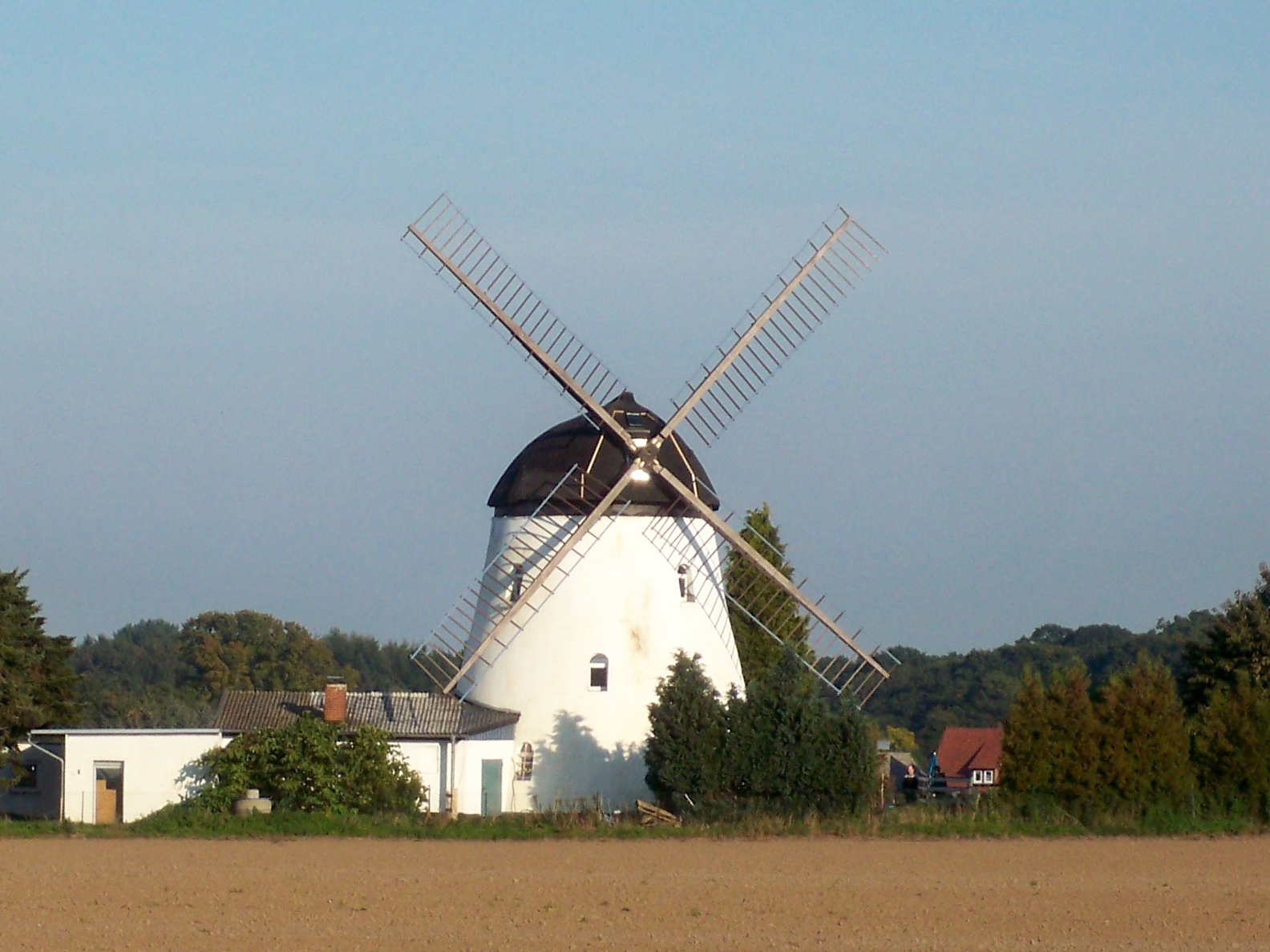
Windmill north of Ohrdorf

The village takes its name from the river Ohre, which rises near the village and empties into the Elbe north of Magdeburg. In East German times the state border ran down the centre of the Ohre not far from the village. The nearest settlement on the East German side was Haselhorst; but it was no longer accessible after the 1950s and the road link was not reopened until 1990.

St. Laurence Church (Laurentius-Kirche), built in 1235, is a fieldstone church and has a Gothic polyptych from the year 1470. According to legend the altar was intended for a church in Wittingen. The wagon on which the altar was carried, broke a wheel in Ohrdorf, an incident that the villagers exploited in order to make the driver drunk and to take the altar for their own church. The pulpit dates to 1700, the ceiling paintings to 1711.

North of Ohrdorf is a residential windmill.

== Sources ==
- Albert Almstedt: Die Kirche in Ohrdorf. Munich: Deutscher Kunstverlag 1984. (Große Baudenkmäler. 357)
- Adolf Meyer: Zur Geschichte der Ohrdorfer Windmühle oder wie Vollhöfner Krüger seine Interessen verfolgte. In: Kalender für den Landkreis Gifhorn, Jg. 1988, S. 121-126.
- Marion Kothe: Innerdörfliche Integration. Zur Bedeutung von Ehe und Vereinsleben auf dem Lande. Göttingen: Schmerse, 1995. (Beiträge zur Volkskunde in Niedersachsen. Bd. 9 : Schriftenreihe der Volkskundlichen Kommission für Niedersachsen. Bd. 10) ISBN 3-926920-17-3 [Research based on interviews of ten couples in Erpensen, Suderwittingen, Ohrdorf and Schneflingen]
