= Cant (surname) =

Cant is a surname. Notable people with the surname include:

- Andrew Cant (educator) (died 1728), Principal of the University of Edinburgh from 1675 to 1685
- Andrew Cant (footballer) (born 1899, date of death unknown), Scottish professional footballer
- Andrew Cant (minister) (1590–1663), Presbyterian minister and leader of the Scottish Covenanters
- Brian Cant (1933–2017), British actor and writer
- Colin Cant (f. 1980s), British television producer
- Gilbert Cant (1909–1982), British-born US journalist
- Harry Cant (1907–1977), Australian politician
- Leslie Cant (1908–1943), British footballer
- Richard Cant (f. 1980s), British actor, son of Brian Cant
- Robert Cant (1915–1997), British politician
- Sanne Cant (born 1990), Belgian cyclist
- William Cant (musician) (1753–1821), English piper
- William Alexander Cant (1863–1933), US federal judge

== See also ==
- Cant (disambiguation)
- Kant (disambiguation)
- Kent (surname)
