= Kanti =

Kanti may refer to:

== Places and structures ==
- Kanti, Muzaffarpur, a town in Muzaffarpur district, Bihar, India
  - Kanti Assembly constituency
  - Kanti railway station
  - Kanti Thermal Power Station
- Kanti Children's Hospital, Kathmandu, Nepal
- Kanti Higher Secondary School, Butwal, Nepal
- Kanti Highway (NH37), Bagmati Province, Nepal
- Kaṇṭi or Kandy, a city in Sri Lanka
- Kaṇṭi District or Kandy District, Sri Lanka

== People ==
- Queen Kanti of Nepal (1906–1973)
- Kanti Abdurakhmanov (1916–2000), Chechen Soviet military officer of World War II
- Kanti Baa (born 1979), Indian field hockey player
- Kanti Bajpai (born 1955), Indian political scientist and educator
- Kanti Bhatt (1931–2019), Indian author and journalist
- Kanti Biswas (1932–2016), Indian politician
- Kanti Ganguly (born 1943), Indian social worker and politician
- Kanti Koli (1947–2021), Indian social worker and politician
- Kanti Lakum, Indian politician
- Kanti Madia (1932–2004), Indian actor, director, producer, and playwright
- Kanti Mardia (born 1935), Indian-British statistician
- Kanti Prasad Meena (born 1960), Indian politician
- Kanti Patel, India politician
- Kanti Shah, Indian director and producer
- Kanti Shah (swimmer) (1920-1989), Indian swimmer and water polo player
- Kanti Singh (born 1957), Indian politician
- K. J. 'Kanti' Shah (1922–1994), 20th century Indian philosopher and professor at Karnataka University

== Other uses ==
- Kanti (film), a 2004 Indian Kannada-language romance-drama film

== See also ==
- Kante (disambiguation)
- Kandy (disambiguation)
