= Ganter Brewery =

Brewery in Freiburg, Germany

Brauerei Ganter
- Interactive map of Brauerei Ganter
- Type: GmbH & Co. KG
- Location: Freiburg im Breisgau, Germany
- Coordinates: 47°59′25″N 7°51′37″E
- Opened: 1865
- Key people: Katharina Ganter-Fraschetti, Detlef Frankenberger
- Annual production volume: 100,000 hectolitres (85,000 US bbl) (2015)
- Revenue: €17.3m (2014)
- Website: ganter.com

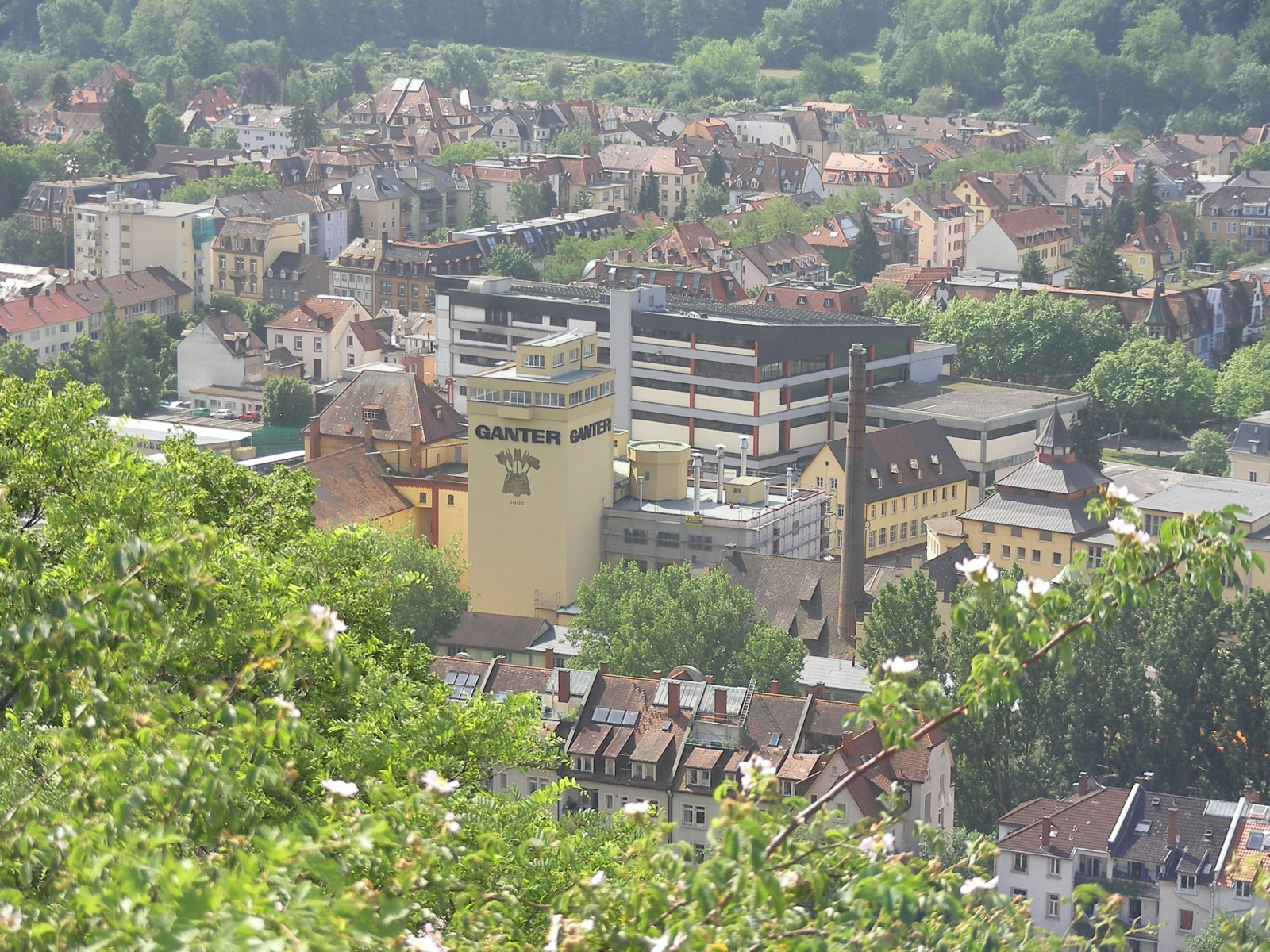
Ganter Brewery

Ganter is a private brewery based in Freiburg, Germany. It was founded in 1865 by Louis Ganter, and as of 2016 is run by Katharina Ganter-Fraschetti and Detlef Frankenberger.

The brewery was founded in a three-story renaissance building which had previously belonged to Erasmus of Rotterdam, and in 1854 had become the Ringwald Brewery. Ten years later, the brewery moved to its current site on the outskirts of the town.

The company fared badly throughout the start of the twentieth century, due to its position at the very centre of the crises of the First and Second World Wars. The historical building in the city centre was destroyed during Operation Tigerfish on 27 November 1944, followed by further bombings of brewery facilities on 2 and 3 December 1944.

A successful reconstruction in the second half of the century led to the takeover of the Löwenbrauerei of Freiburg in 1979, and a partnership with the Inselbrauerei Feierling.

The brewery now produces a 4.9% vol. Ganter pilsner, a "Freiburger" pilsner, a 5.2% special export beer, a light and dark 5.4% wheat beers and an alcohol-free beer. Also produced a strong Bock beer, Wodan. At 7.5% vol., this was first brewed in 1898 as a nourishing brew for long hungry winters.

Alcohol-free drinks are now produced by the associated OGA (Oberrheinische Industrie- und Handelsgesellschaft, Ganter'sche Aktiengesellschaft), which was established in 1922 to make liqueur. A particularly successful orange-lemonade drink allowed the expansion into other fruit juices and lemonades.

The grounds of the brewery played host to a concert by Diana Ross in 2005 (as part of the firm's 140th anniversary celebrations), and in 2006 the inner courtyard was used by Simply Red and Dieter Thomas Kuhn.

== See also ==
Privatbrauerei Wittingen
