= Kevin Schulze =

German footballer

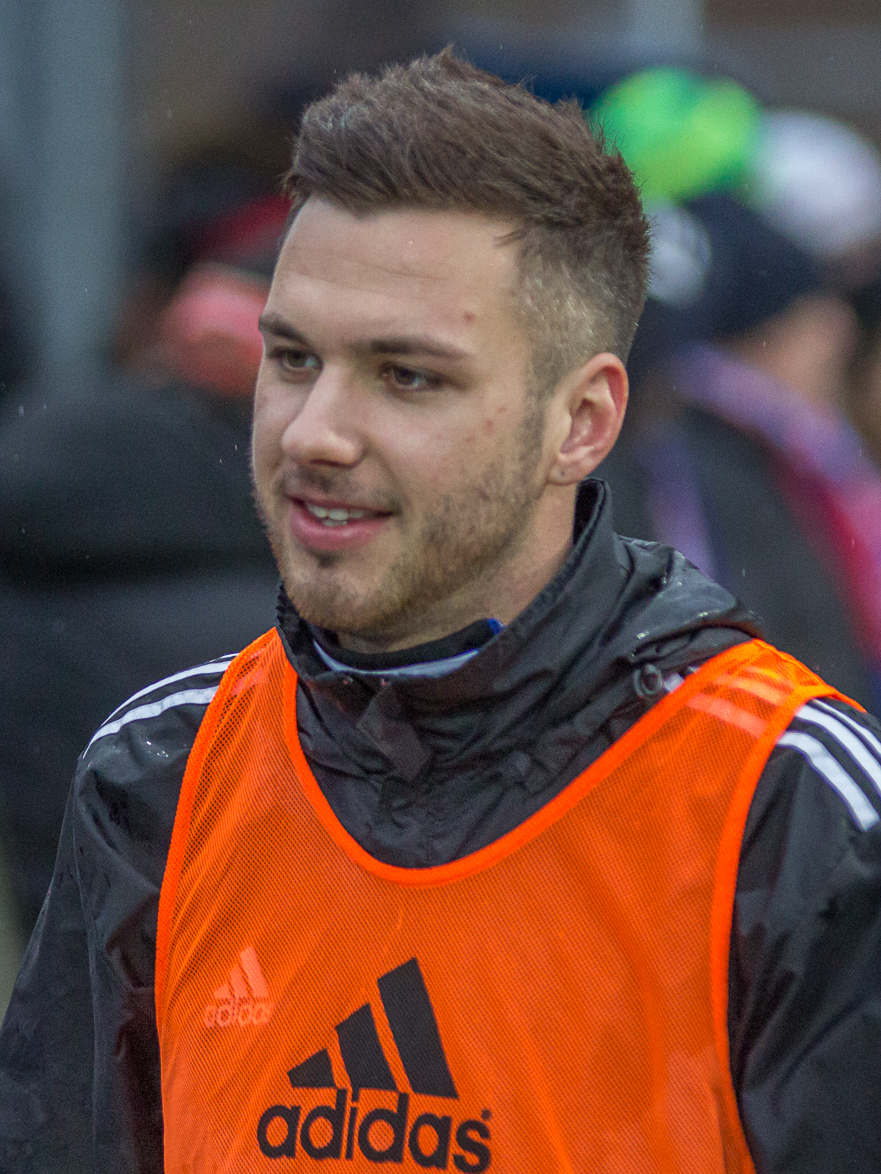
- Schulze in 2014

Personal information
- Date of birth: 25 January 1992 (age 34)
- Place of birth: Wittingen, Germany
- Height: 1.89 m (6 ft 2 in)
- Position: Right-back

Team information
- Current team: SSV Vorsfelde
- Number: 11

Youth career
- 1995–2007: Germania Parsau
- 2007–2011: VfL Wolfsburg

Senior career*
Years	Team	Apps	(Gls)
2010–2013	VfL Wolfsburg II	59	(4)
2013–2015	Greuther Fürth	0	(0)
2013	Greuther Fürth II	15	(3)
2014	→ Holstein Kiel (loan)	6	(1)
2014–2015	→ Wacker Nordhausen (loan)	24	(0)
2015–2018	Wacker Nordhausen	80	(2)
2018	Wacker Nordhausen II	1	(0)
2018–2020	Lokomotive Leipzig	51	(7)
2020–	SSV Vorsfelde	54	(9)

International career
2007	Germany U15	1	(0)
2008	Germany U16	1	(0)
2009	Germany U17	1	(0)
2009	Germany U18	5	(0)
2010	Germany U19	2	(0)
- * Club domestic league appearances and goals as of 20 May 2024

Kevin Schulze (born 25 January 1992) is a German footballer who plays as a right-back for SSV Vorsfelde in the Oberliga Niedersachsen.

== Career ==
Schulze made his professional debut for Holstein Kiel in the 3. Liga on 1 February 2014, starting against Hallescher FC before being substituted out in the 71st minute for Patrick Breitkreuz, with the away match finishing as a 0–1 loss.
