= Radenbeck (Wittingen) =

- Ortsteil of Wittingen
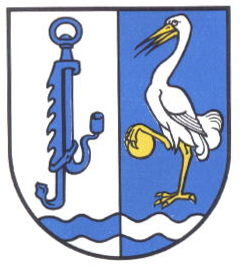
- Coat of arms
- Interactive map of Radenbeck
- Location within Germany Location within Lower Saxony
- Coordinates: 52°38′49″N 10°51′56″E
- Country: Germany
- State: Lower Saxony
- District: Gifhorn
- Town: Wittingen

Area
  - Total: 13.65 km^{2} (5.27 sq mi)
- Elevation: 75 m (246 ft)

Population (2017-12-31)
  - Total: 557
  - Density: 40.8/km^{2} (106/sq mi)
- Time zone: UTC+01:00 (CET)
  - Summer (DST): UTC+02:00 (CEST)
- Postal codes: 29378
- Dialling codes: 05836

Radenbeck is a village in the town of Wittingen in the district of Gifhorn in the north German state of Lower Saxony.

== Location ==
Radenbeck lies 13 kilometres southeast of the town of Wittingen and, like it, on the B 244 federal road.

The parish extends from the River Ohre to the east, a tributary of the Elbe, it rises towards the west, and is on a gentle, northeast facing slope. The state border with Saxony-Anhalt runs along the Ohre 1.1 kilometres away.

== Sources ==
- Edeltraud Hundertmark: Der Landkreis Gifhorn, II. Gemeindebeschreibungen mit statistischem Anhang. Teil 2: Mahrenholz bis Zicherie. (Die Deutschen Landkreise. Handbuch für Verwaltung, Wirtschaft und Kultur. Reihe D: Die Landkreise in Niedersachsen Bd. 26, II), pp. 587–592.
