= Butting Group =

German manufacturer

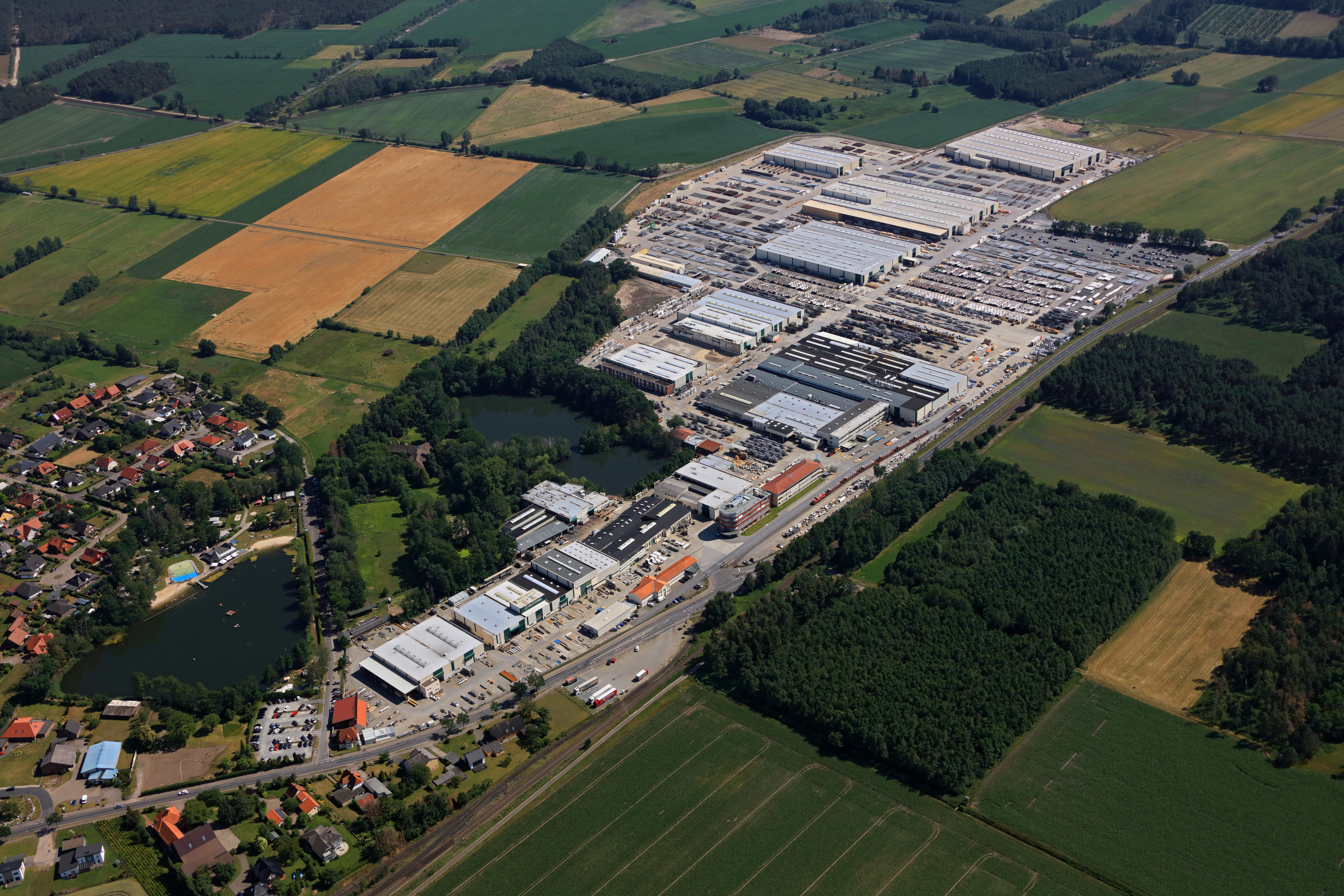
- Headquarter in Knesebeck
- Type: BUTTING Gruppe GmbH & Co KG
- Industry: Steel, stainless, steel processing, pipeline construction
- Founded: 1777
- Headquarters: Wittingen-Knesebeck, Germany
- Area served: Worldwide
- Key people: Hermann Butting (Owner)
- Revenue: €1.0 billion (2024)
- Number of employees: 2,500 (2024)
- Website: butting.com

The Butting Group (German: BUTTING Gruppe GmbH & Co. KG ) is a German manufacturer of longitudinally welded stainless-steel pipes, clad pipes, customized components and related engineered products. The company is headquartered in Wittingen-Knesebeck, Lower Saxony, and operates production and engineering facilities in Europe, Asia, and North America.

== History ==
The company was founded in 1777 in Crossen an der Oder as a coppersmith's workshop. Under Hermann Butting (1852–1925), it developed into an industrial enterprise by 1890. In 1912, management passed to his son, engineer Hanns Butting (1882–1966). From 1916 onward, the company operated as a metal goods factory. During this period, it produced copper and brass pipes, rods, wires, and sheets for civilian and military markets. Hanns Butting served on the supervisory board of the Niederlausitzer Bank from 1930 to 1942. After the loss of the original site in the Eastern territories of Germany at the end of the Second World War, the company was re-established in Knesebeck in 1945. Pipe production began in 1949. Dr. Hannshermann Butting (1925–2000), who took over in 1955, expanded the firm into an international stainless-steel pipe manufacturer; by 1970, the workforce had grown to over 300 employees. A second site was opened in 1991 in Schwedt/Oder, later becoming Butting Anlagenbau GmbH & Co. KG. Since 2000, the company has been led by Hermann Butting (born 1964). The workforce exceeded 1,000 employees by 2003. International expansion began with Butting China in Tieling in 2004, followed by subsidiaries in Canada (2005) and Brazil (2009). Key acquisitions included Sosta in Könnern (2017), non-destructive testing specialist Hillger NDT (2019), Textoris GmbH (2020), and Schwanner GmbH in Burgkirchen an der Alz (2021), later renamed Butting CryoTech GmbH. By 2022, the group employed around 1,980 people, rising to about 2,500 in 2023; revenues that year reached €863 million. In early 2025, the Finnish prefabrication company PrePipe Oy was acquired, and Butting Plant Engineering was founded with an office in Oberursel.

In 2025, Butting began establishing its North American headquarters and first U.S. production facility in Loxley, Alabama, where the company laid the foundation for the new plant in November 2025.

== Operations ==
The Butting Group is organized as a family-owned corporate group with subsidiaries in Europe, Asia, and North America . Its activities include the manufacturing of welded stainless-steel pipes, the production of pipe assemblies and components, and engineering services for industrial applications. Butting has diversified beyond its traditional oil and gas business into areas including specialty plant engineering, pipe components, and cryogenics.

== Major subsidiaries ==
- Germany: H. Butting GmbH & Co. KG (Knesebeck), Butting Anlagenbau (Schwedt/Oder), Butting Könnern GmbH (Könnern), Butting CryoTech (Burgkirchen), Butting Plant Engineering (Oberursel), Hillger NDT (Braunschweig), Textoris (Düren)
- Brazil: Butting Tubos de Inox (Blumenau)
- China: Butting (Tieling), Butting International Engineering (Hong Kong), Butting Engineering Management (Beijing)
- Finland: PrePipe Oy (Lappeenranta)
- Canada: Butting Canada (Calgary)
- United States: Butting USA (Loxley, Alabama)

== Products ==
The company manufactures longitudinally welded stainless-steel pipes, clad pipes, cryogenic piping systems, and prefabricated assemblies. Its products are used in applications including chemical processing, energy systems, cryogenic technology, seawater desalination, architecture, and aerospace projects such as the European Ariane 6 launch vehicle.

== Corporate structure ==
The group's activities are divided into several business segments:

- Pipe technology
- Plant engineering
- Engineering and project services
- Support and service units
