= Wittingen =

- Town
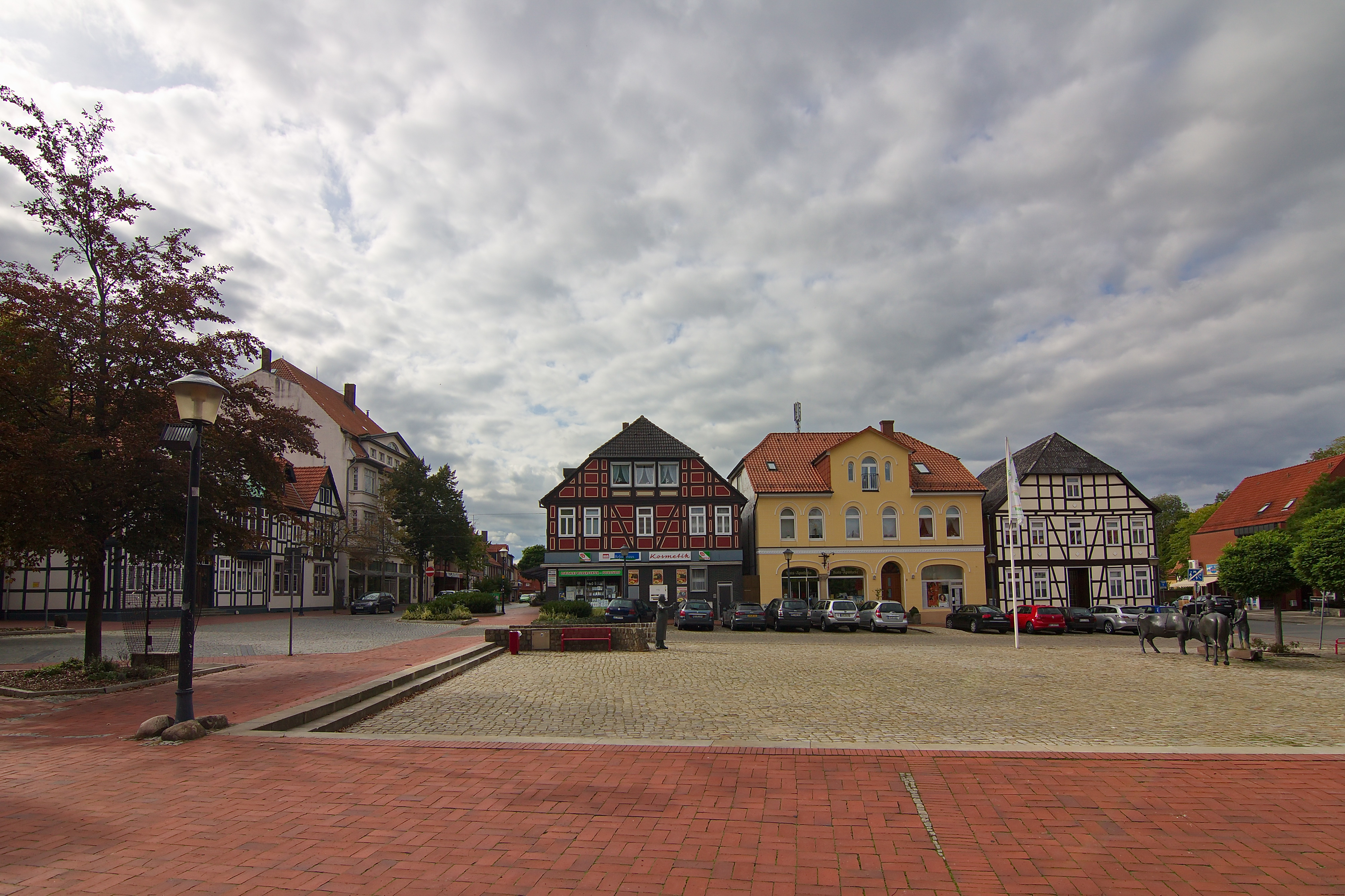
- Market square

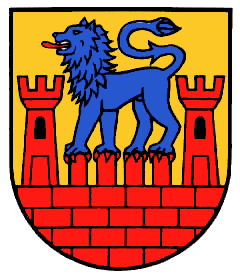
- Coat of arms

- Location of Wittingen within Gifhorn district
- Interactive map of Wittingen
- Location within Germany Location within Lower Saxony
- Coordinates: 52°43′N 10°44′E
- Country: Germany
- State: Lower Saxony
- District: Gifhorn
- Subdivisions: 26 districts

Government
  - Mayor (2019–24): Andreas Ritter (Ind.)

Area
  - Total: 225.83 km^{2} (87.19 sq mi)
- Elevation: 79 m (259 ft)

Population (2025-12-31)
  - Total: 11,028
  - Density: 48.833/km^{2} (126.48/sq mi)
- Time zone: UTC+01:00 (CET)
  - Summer (DST): UTC+02:00 (CEST)
- Postal codes: 29378, 29379
- Dialling codes: 05831
- Vehicle registration: GF
- Website: www.wittingen.de

Wittingen (German pronunciation: [ˈvɪtɪŋən]) is a town in the district of Gifhorn, Lower Saxony, Germany. It is about 30 kilometres (19 mi) northeast of Gifhorn, and 30 kilometres (19 mi) southeast of Uelzen.

== Division of the town ==
Wittingen consists of 27 districts:

- Boitzenhagen
- Darrigsdorf
- Erpensen
- Eutzen
- Gannerwinkel
- Glüsingen
- Hagen
- Kakerbeck
- Knesebeck
- Küstorf
- Lüben
- Mahnburg
- Ohrdorf
- Plastau
- Rade
- Radenbeck
- Schneflingen
- Stöcken
- Suderwittingen
- Teschendorf
- Vorhop
- Transvaal
- Wittingen
- Wollerstorf
- Wunderbüttel
- Zasenbeck
- Rumsdorf

== History ==
The earliest identified record of Wittingen appears in a document dated 781 which defines the territorial borders of the Bishopric of Hildesheim. Another early mention dates from 803 during the reign of Charlemagne, this time identifying the borders of the newly established Bishopric of Halberstadt. Neither of these sources pins down a date for the foundation of Wittingen, however.

During the Medieval period Wittingen was not merely a frontier point, but also a focus for traffic crossing into and out of the Altmark. The town was a trading point and an overnight stop for east-west commerce. Its significance was signaled in the ninth century when The Bishopric had the Church of St Stephen built. By the beginning of the thirteenth century Wittingen had been granted Town privileges, and was a part owner of the Lüneburg Mint. The fourteenth century was a period of political instability in this part of Europe and in 1340 ownership of Wittingen was transferred to the Welfs of Celle. Later, with the outbreak of the Hildesheim Diocesan Feud, the town was almost completely destroyed in 1519. Consequently, the building of town fortifications began shortly afterwards.

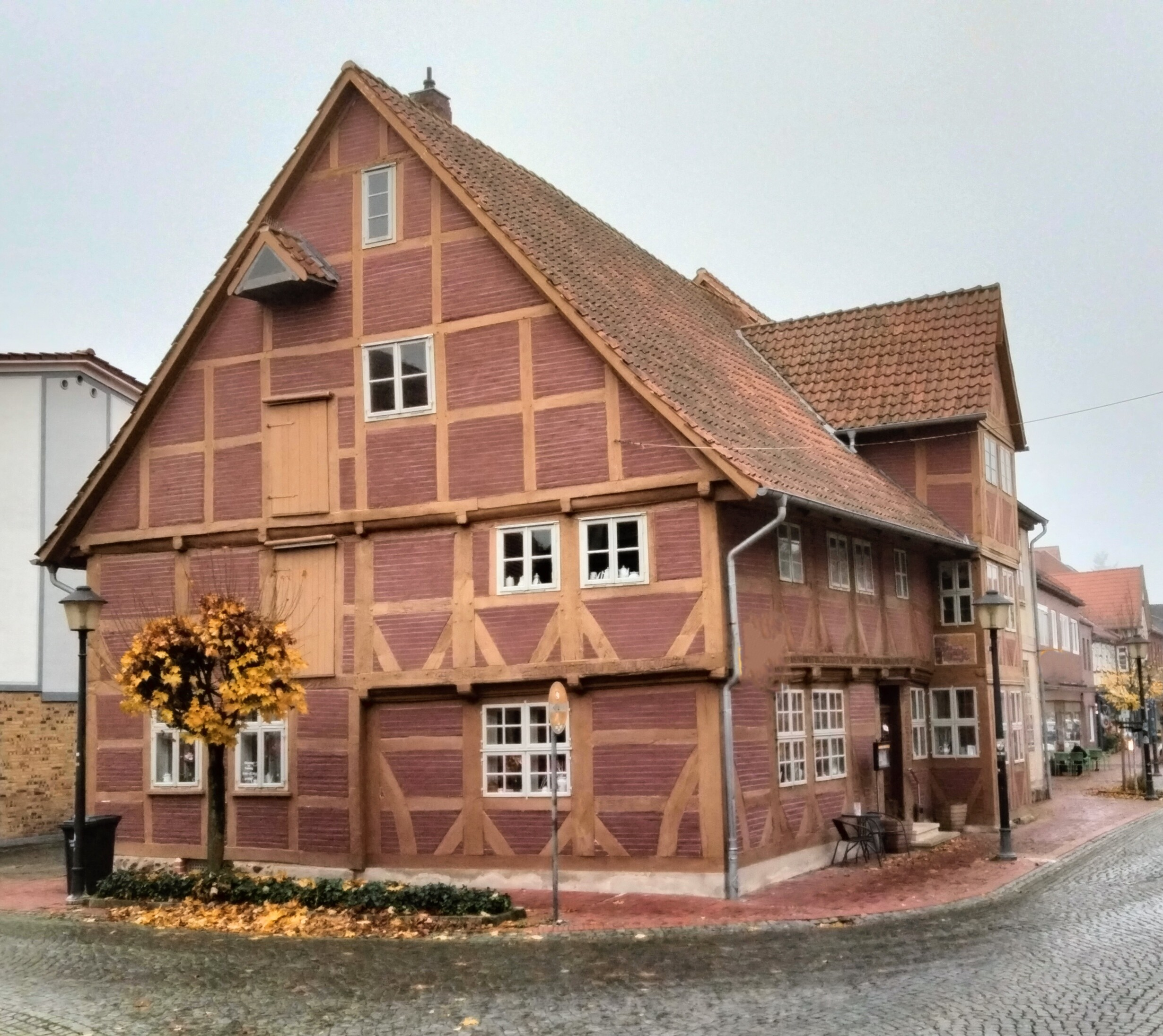
Monument house Kreyenberg dating from 1640

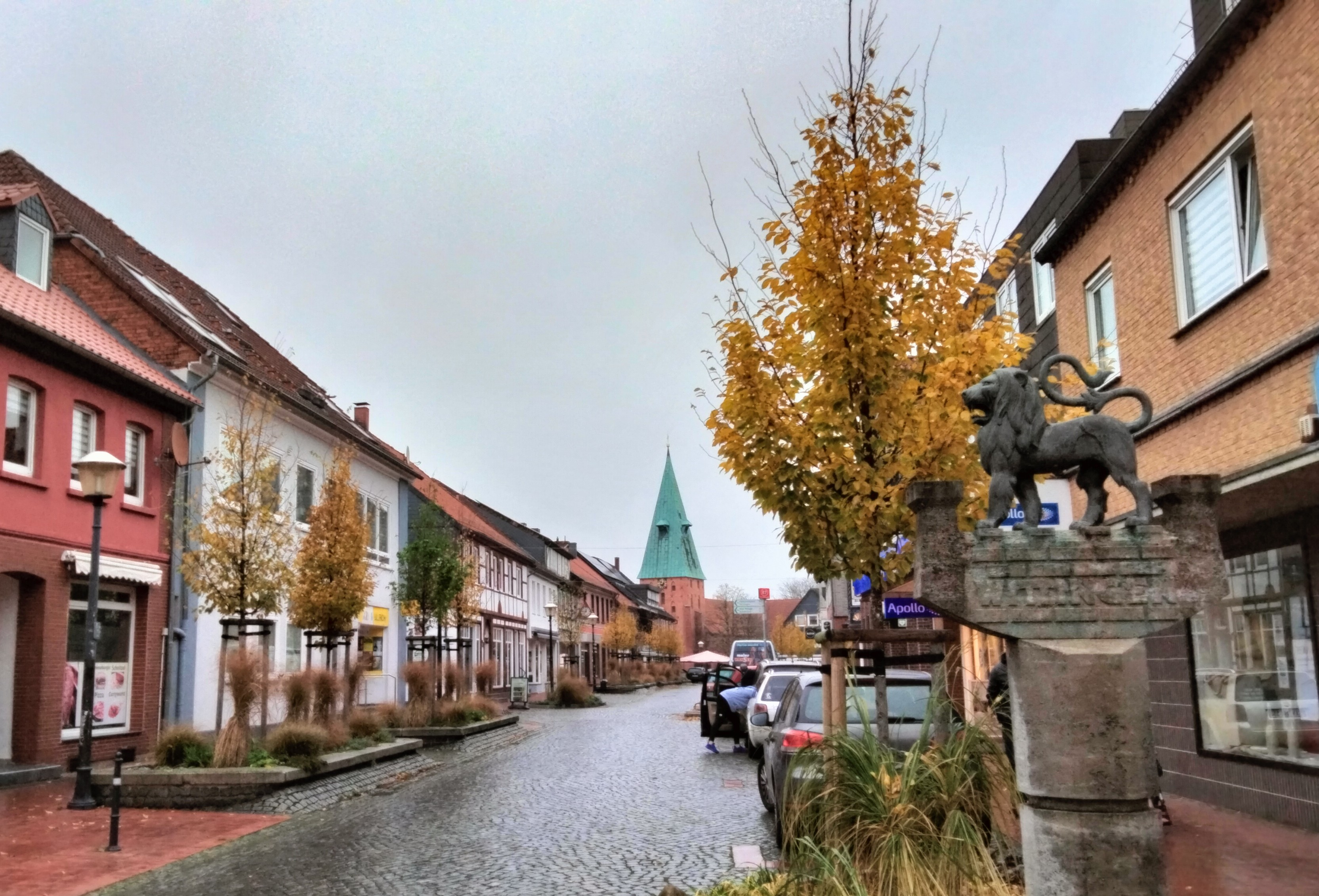
Lange Straße, Wittingen's Main Street

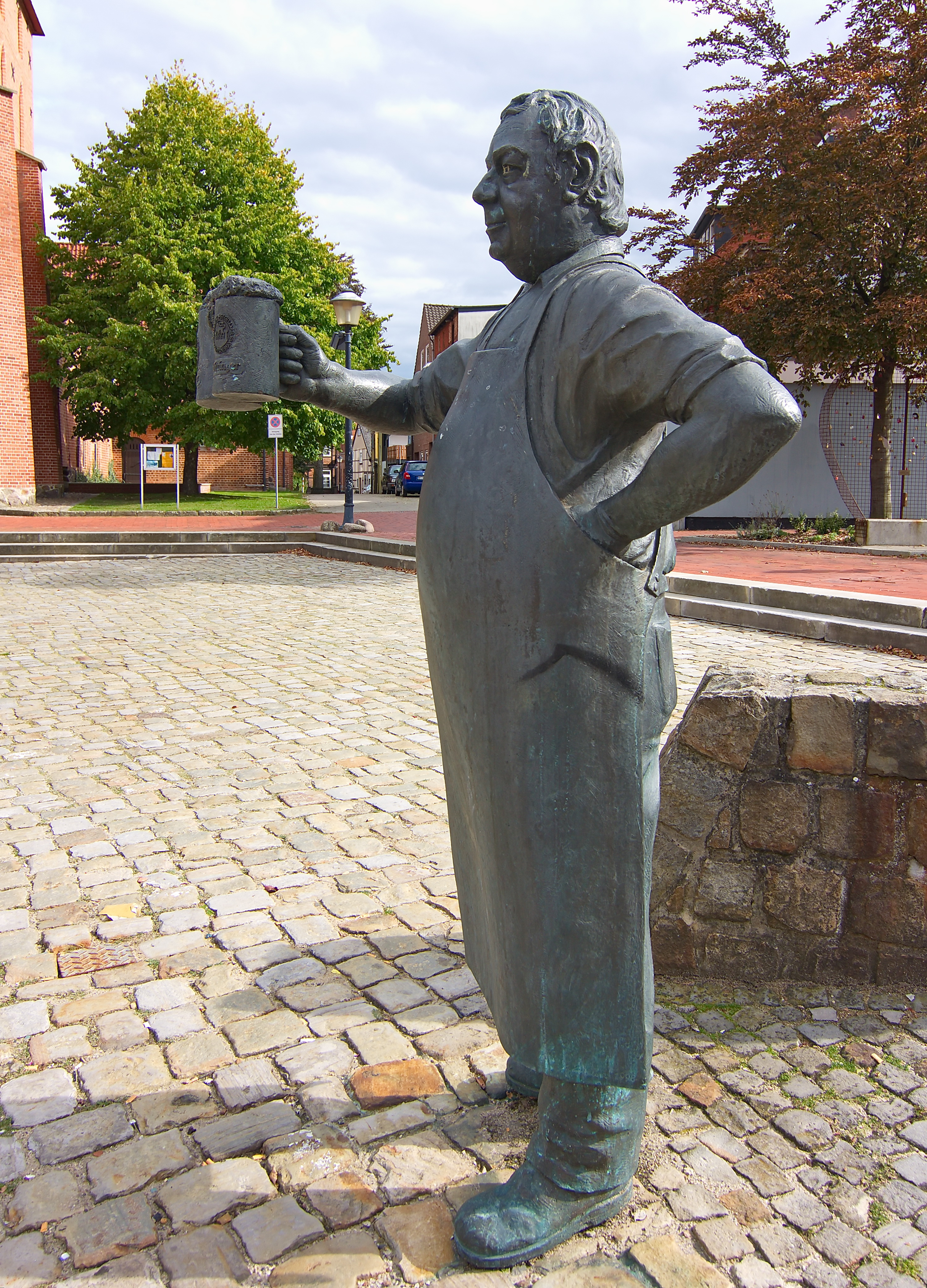
Brewer sculpture (1998 by Georg Arfmann)

== Demographic data ==
According to the Lower Saxony State Department for Statistics 12,291 people lived in the town of Wittingen in 2005 in 3,745 buildings with a total of 5,399 homes at an average floor space of 49.9 square metres (537 ft^{2}) per person. Since the formation of the borough, the population grew steadily, both by natural population increase as well as immigration. 21.3% of the population in 2005 were under 18 years old, 7.1% from 18 to 25, 27.0% from 25 to 45, 24.4% from 45 to 64, and 20.3% were 65 years old or older. The unemployment rate stood at an average of 11.3% (men: 9.4%, women: 14.0%). 2,247 people commute regularly out of the town and 1745 into it daily.

== Mayors ==
- 1974-1985: Robert Leipelt
- 1985-1989: Paul Degenhardt
- 1990-1991: Wilfried Wolter
- 1991-1996: Lothar Schoss
- 1996-2001: Günther Schulze
- 2001-2002: Hans-Jürgen Schindler
- 2002–2019: Karl Ridder (CDU)
- since 2019: Andreas Ritter

== Sights ==
Various half-timbered houses, e.g. Haus Kreyenberg dating from 1640, can be visited in the town centre, especially in the Market Place, in Achternstraße and in Lange Straße, Wittingen's Main Street. Junkerhof is a half-timbered house which was built between 1529 and 1550, dismantled and rebuilt in a park in Wittingen between 1985 and 1987. A part of the medieval rempart is preserved between Achternstraße and Hindenburgwall. Saint Stephanus Church was founded in the 9th century, enlarged around 1250 and rebuilt after a fire in Brick Gothic style.

== Infrastructure ==
=== Health and medicine ===
Wittingen has one hospital (Städtisches Krankenhaus), four pharmacies and six dentists.

=== Transport ===
Wittingen is situated at the Brunswick-Uelzen railway and offers connections to Braunschweig and to Uelzen. The town has a port along the Elbe Lateral Canal which was inaugurated in 1976.

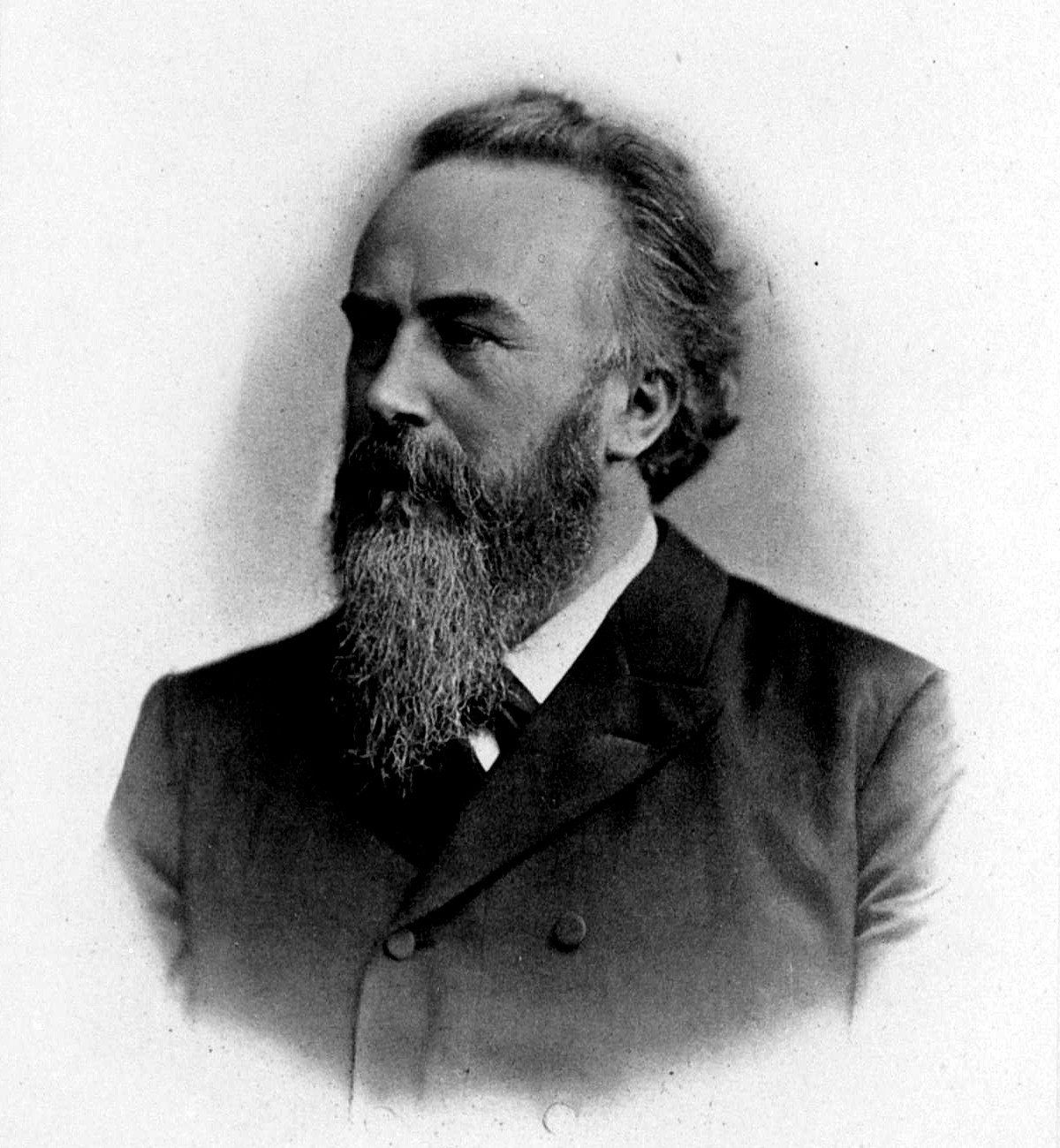
Philipp Spitta

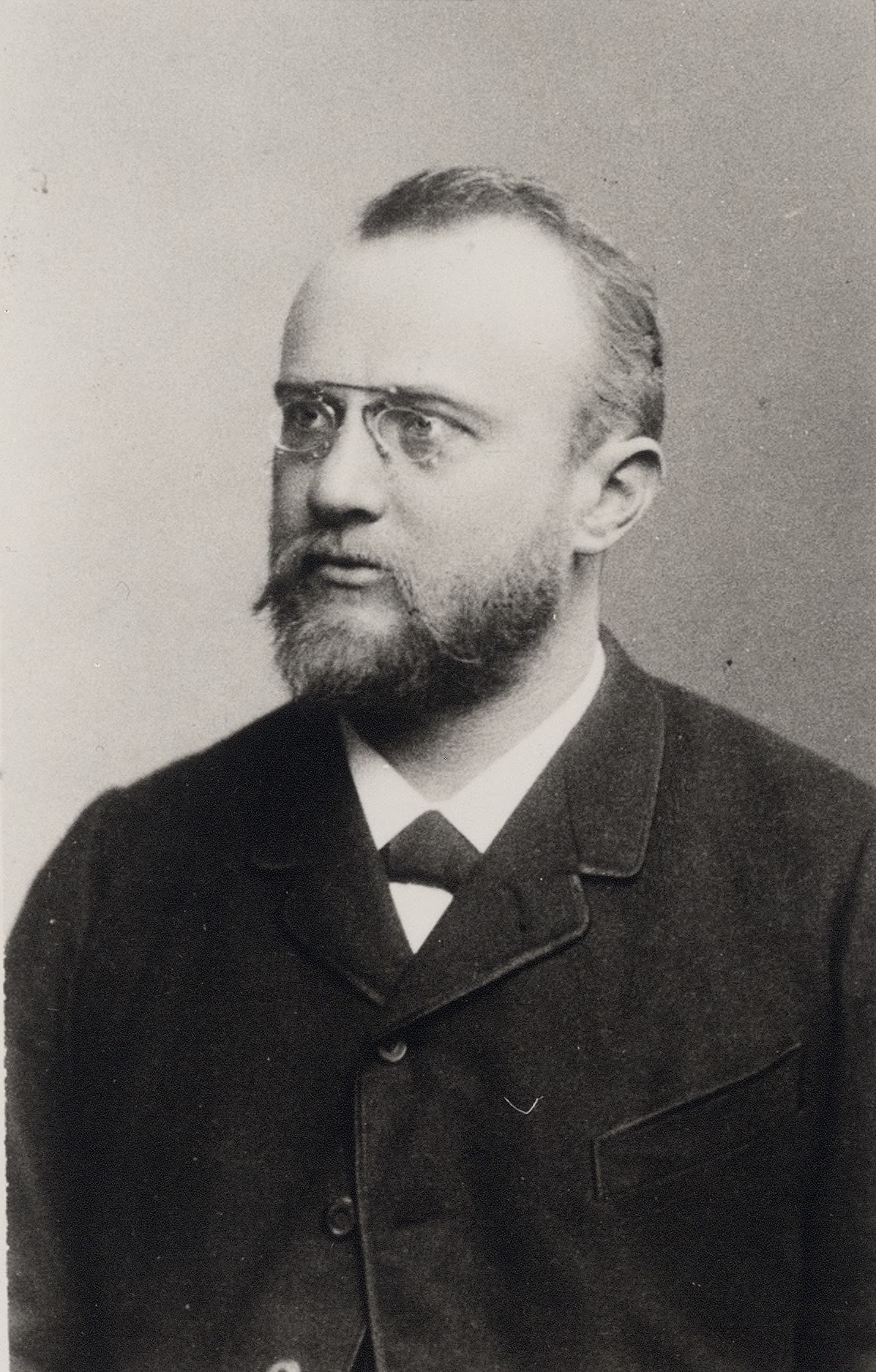
Friedrich Spitta before 1896

== Notable people ==
- Philipp Spitta (1801-1859), Lutheran theologian and poet, Superintendent in Wittingen 1847-1853.
- Friedrich Spitta (1852-1924), German Protestant theologian, born in Wittingen, son of Philipp.
- Bernd Fix (born 1962), computer specialist, member of the Chaos Computer Club
- Lars Nieberg (born 1963), equestrian; twice team gold medallist at the 1996 and 2000 Summer Olympics
- Kevin Schulze (born 1992), footballer who has played over 200 games

== Industry ==
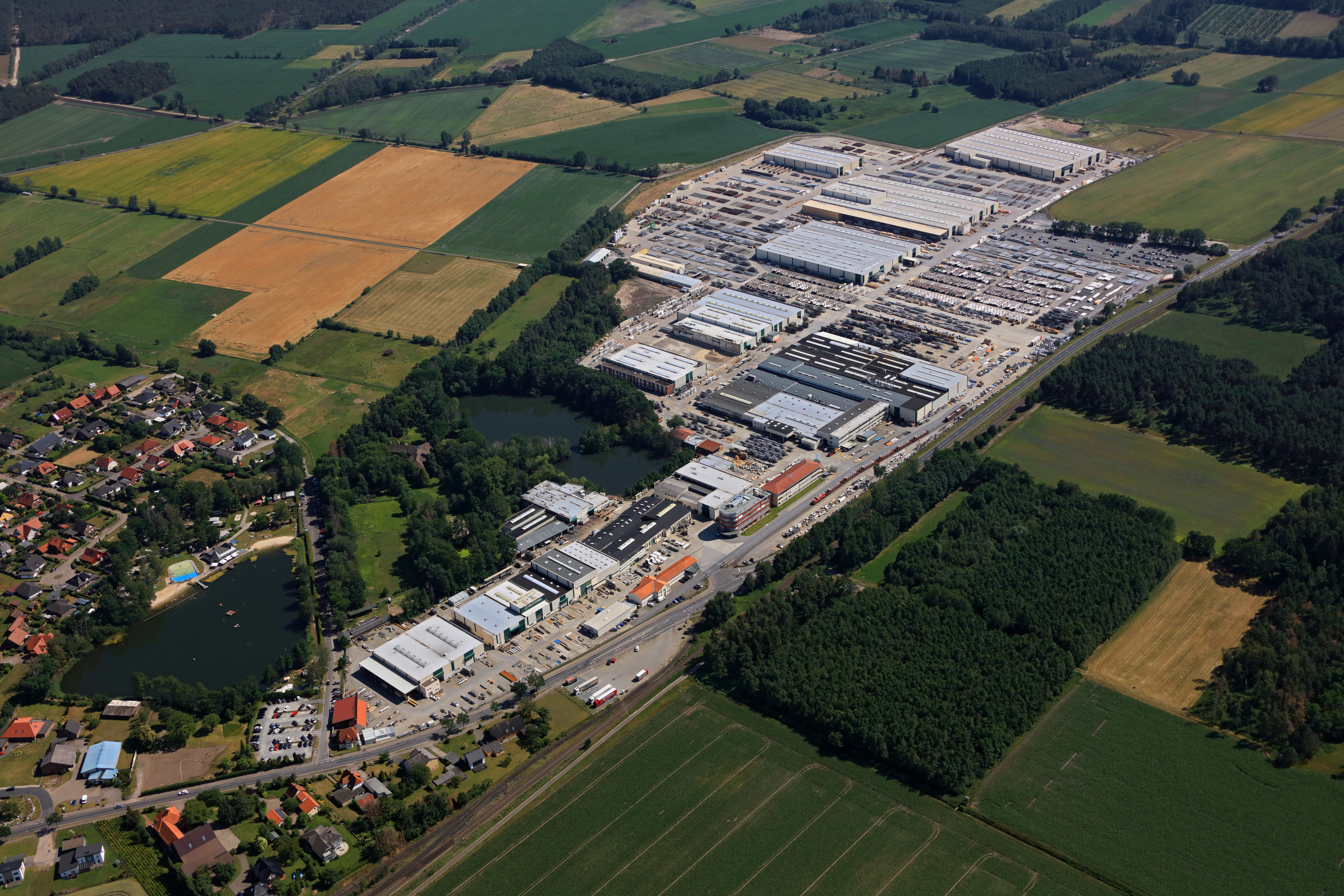
Butting Group HQ in Knesebeck

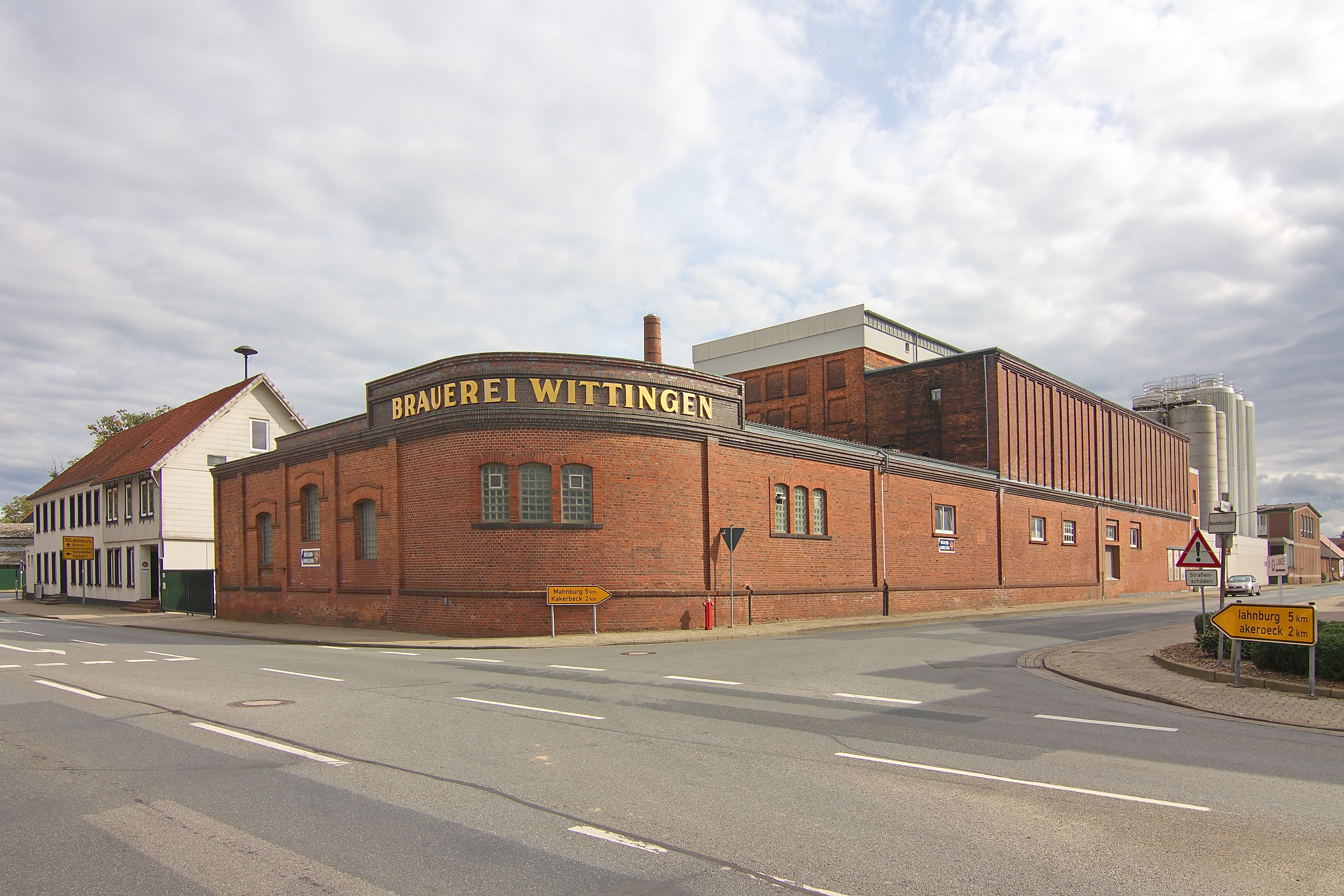
Privatbrauerei Wittingen

The Butting Group is one of the world’s leading manufacturers of stainless steel pipes and components and is the largest employer in Wittingen. The Privatbrauerei Wittingen produces with 100 employees 365 000 hectolitres of beer per year.
