= Privatbrauerei Wittingen =

Brewery in Germany

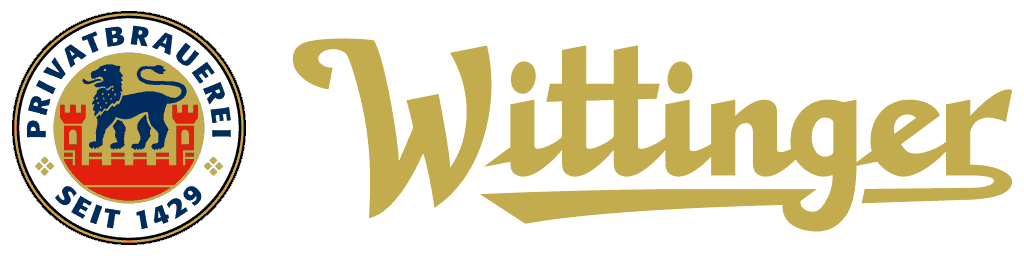
Wittinger logo

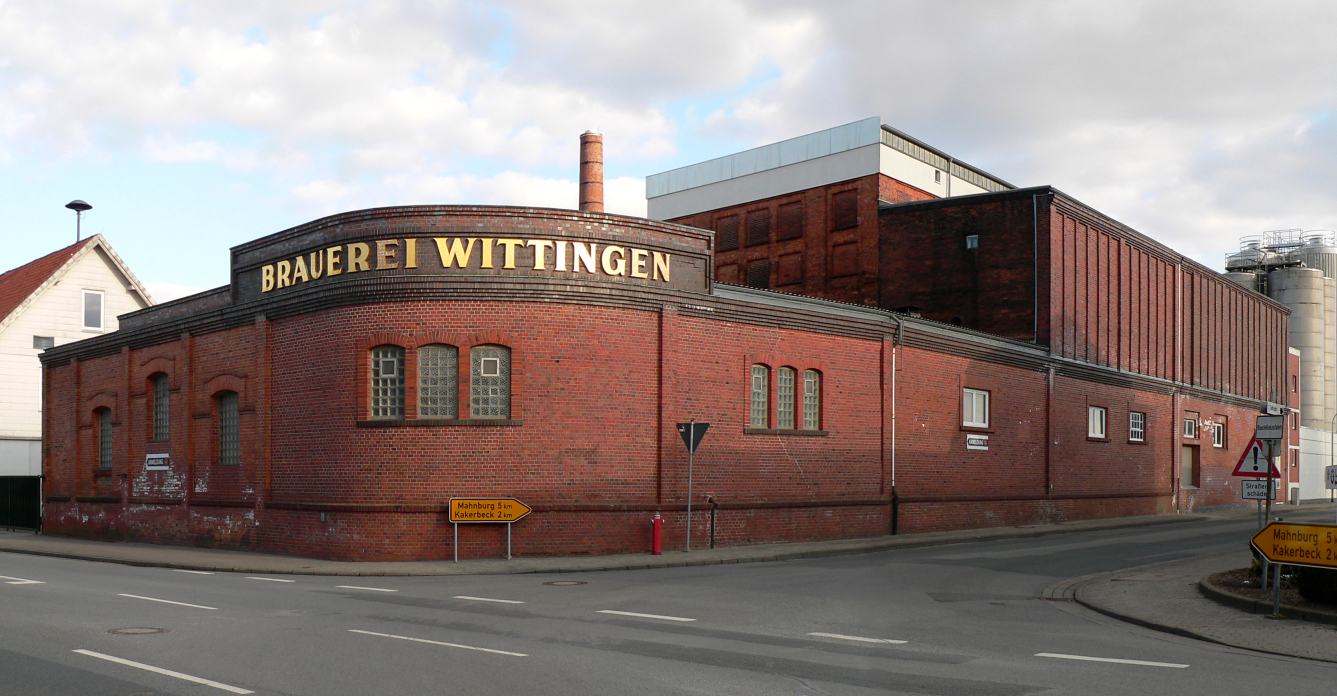
Privatbrauerei Wittingen

Privatbrauerei Wittingen GmbH ("Wittingen Private Brewery") is a German brewing firm based in the Lower Saxon town of Wittingen. In 2013, the brewery had 104 employees and produced 432,550 hl of beer.

According to the firm's statements it has been a family business since 1429, and is therefore one of the oldest private breweries in Germany. The firm has 100 employees and produces about 365,000 hectolitres (64,200,000 imp pt) of beer per year. It delivers to customers in North Germany within a radius of 150 km. In addition, there is a division that dispatches beer throughout Germany.

At the creditors' meeting of another brewery, the Herrenhäuser Brewery, on 20 October 2010 it was agreed that it could be purchased by Privatbrauerei Wittingen.

== Brands ==
Currently the firm offers the following types of beer:

- Wittinger Premium
- Wittinger Pilsner
- Wittinger Doppelbock
- Wittinger Weizen
- Wittinger Landbier
- Stackmann's Dunkel
- Stackmann's Alster
- 1429 - Das Original

== Additional Products ==
In October 2026, the brewery took over production of the Hemelinger and Weserländer beer brands on behalf of Getränke Ahlers. Both brands had previously been produced at the insolvent Hofbrauhaus Wolters brewery in Braunschweig.
