= Kanteh =

Kanteh is a Gambian surname.

== People with the name ==
- Ebou Kanteh (born 1995), Gambian footballer
- Fatou Kanteh (born 1997), Gambian footballer
- Mamadou Kanteh Danjo (born 1989), Spanish footballer
- Muhammed Kanteh, Gambian politician
- Seth Kanteh Hellberg (born 1995), Swedish-Liberian footballer
