= Kant, Shahjahanpur =

Kant
- Town
- Location in Uttar Pradesh, India
- Coordinates: 27.8°N 79.8°E
- Country: India
- State: Uttar Pradesh
- District: Shahjahanpur
- Elevation: 485 m (1,591 ft)

Population (2011)
  - Total: 27,137

Languages
  - Official: Khariboli, Hindi, Punjabi, Urdu
- Time zone: UTC+5:30 (IST)
- Vehicle registration: UP 27
- Website: www.kantycity.com

Kant is a town and a nagar panchayat of Shahjahanpur district in the Indian state of Uttar Pradesh.

== Geography ==
Kant is located at 27.8°N 79.8°E. It has an average elevation of 485 metres (147 feet).

Kant was headquarters of British academy in 1940. It is the most growing town of Shahjahanpur just 10 km away from the main Shahjahanpur city. One freedom fighter belongs to Kant.

== Demographics ==
As of 2011 India census, Kant had a population of 27,137. Males constitute 53% of the population and females 47%. Kant has an average literacy rate of 87%, higher than the national average of 74%: male literacy is 88%, and female literacy is 86%. In Kant, 12% of the population is under 6 years of age.

Religions in Kant
Religion	Percent
Muslims	56.28%
Hindus	43.49%
Christians	0.10%
Sikhs	0.01%
Buddhists	0.01%
Others, no religion	0.11%
Distribution of religions

== Educational institutions ==
The following institutions are running in the town area of Kant to promote education level of the public:

- Govt Degree College established in 2016 under central govt scheme RUSA.
- Maan Sharde Shiksha Mandir Inter College Kant, Shahjahanpur,
- Junior high school|Junior High School, (Old), Kant, Shahjahanpur.
- Junior High School (New), Patti Mohalla, Kant, Shahjahanpur.
- Vinoba Bhave Inter College, Kant, Shahjahanpur.
- Government|Rajkeey Inter college, Kant, Shahjahanpur.
- Saraswati Shishu Mandir, Kant, Shahjahanpur.
- Oxford public school, Kant, Shahjahanpur.
- Islamiya schoolT
- Tarawati Inter College, Kamalnayanpur (kant)
- Board of Secondary Education Kant Shahjahanpur U.P.
