= Canter rhythm =

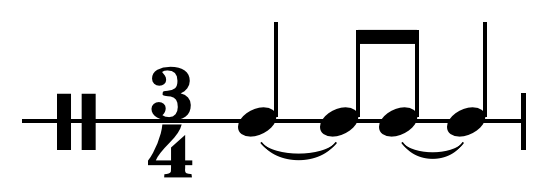
Canter rhythm

Canter time, canter timing or canter rhythm is a two-beat regular rhythmic pattern of a musical instrument or in dance steps within 3/4 time music. The term is borrowed from the canter horse gait, which sounds three hoof beats followed by a pause, i.e., 3 accents in 4/4 time.

In waltz dances it may mark the 1st and the 4th eighths of the measure, producing a 2/4 overlay beat over the 3/4 time. In other words, when a 3/4 measure is cued as "one, two-and three", the canter rhythm marks "one" and "and". This rhythm is the basis of the Canter Waltz. In modern ballroom dancing, an example is the Canter Pivot in the Viennese Waltz.

In Vals (a 3/4 style of Tango), the canter rhythm is also known as medio galope (which actually means "canter" in Spanish) and may accent beats 1 and 2 of the 3/4 measure.

The Canter Waltz or Canter is a dance with waltz music characterized by the canter rhythm of steps. A 1922 dance manual describes it as follows: "The Canter Waltz has been revived and presents an opportunity to show the use of "direction" in the straight backward and forward series of walking steps. This dance is walking to waltz time but walking most quietly and gracefully. There are two steps to the three counts of music. Step forward on 1 and make the second step between the 2 and 3 count. Give the first step the accent, although the steps are almost of the same value. It may, perhaps, help the student practicing alone with the aid of the victrola to count "one-and two-and three-and", making the second step on the second "and", until able to do the step smoothly."

== See also ==
- Duple metre
- Triple metre
- Polyrhythm
- Syncopation
