= Rama Kant =

Indian fiction writer in Hindi language

Rama Kant (2 December 1931 – 6 September 1991) was an Indian fiction writer in Hindi language, best known for his writing on the struggles of the lower and middle-classes.

== Early life ==
Rama Kant was born in Mirzapur district of Uttar Pradesh. He dropped out of Allahabad University in 1951 where he had been selected for the hockey nationals as standby. He migrated to Kolkata and joined Indian Airlines leveraging his hockey skills. He switched to journalism as his profession where he could expose the loopholes in Indian sports bodies.

== Career ==
As a journalist he worked with Aaj newspaper in Banaras, Maya in Allahabad. He came to Delhi to work with Janyug newspaper and settled there. Afterwards, he worked with the Soviet Information Centre as joint editor of Soviet Bhumi, the Hindi magazine published by the Soviet embassy. He worked with Soviet Bhumi until 1983, when he took a voluntary retirement to write full time. He also intended to publish a weekly newspaper from Sadatpur on the outskirts of Delhi. The newspaper Krasaad came out in 1987.

== Writings ==
He main genre of writing was the political and social fiction, but he wrote some detective novels as well.

He also wrote successful 'laghu katha's' [mini stories] from the 50s, through the 80s. His short stories of 60's, 70's and even 80's became immensely popular and received a dedicated readership. His writings got translated into various languages including English, Urdu, Punjabi and Kannada. An important story of Ramakant 'Karlo Habshi ka Sandook' was presented to South African President Nelson Mandela during the latter's Indian visit after its translation in English by Bhisham Sahni.

In 1969, Ramakant received the Soviet Nehru Prize for his contribution to the comparative analysis of Hindi and Russian literature. Ramakant was a regular Diary Writer as well and he wrote many volumes which are yet to be published.

Ramakant was also an avid and serious reader of world literature .

== Legacy ==
He died in Delhi on 6 September 1991. In his memory, Ramakant Smriti Kahani Puraskar is being organized annually in Delhi since 1998 by some close friends of Ramakant led by Mahesh Darpan and Ramakant's family. Recipients of the awards are as follows. 2002- Neelakshi singh. 2011- Akanksha Pare kashiv. 2012- Oma Sharma 2017- Vivek Mishra. 2018- Rakesh Tiwari.

== Bibliography ==
The important literary contributions of Ramakant are:

- Doshi 1979
- Juloos wala aadmi [novel]
- Chhote Chhote Mahayuddh [novel]
- Pyada Farzi Ardab [novel]
- Khoi hui Aawaz [novel]
- Darwaaze par aag [novel]
- Upsanskaar [Satirical novel]
- Tutate judte swara [novel]
- Teesra Desh [novel] 1981
- Bambai ki Billi [novel]
- Zindagi Bhar ka Jhooth [Short Story Collection]
- Uski Ladai [short story collection]
- Koi aur baat [short story collection]
- Karlo Habshi ka Sandook [short story collection]
- Beech ke bees baras [short story collection]
- Ek Vipreet Katha [short story collection]
- Charchit Kahaniyan [short story collection]
- Bhai Mukti [short story]
- Ghar Ki Vitto [short story]
