= Frederic Caunt =

Frederic Caunt (22 June 1859, in Blackley – 15 October 1933, in Basseterre) was Archdeacon of Saint Kitts from 1906 until 1925.

Caunt was educated at Trinity College, Dublin; and ordained in 1890. After a curacy at St Anthony, Montserrat he was the Rector of St Paul, Nevis from 1890 to 1899; and then of Holy Trinity, Ponce, Puerto Rico from 1899 to 1901. After that he was Vicar general of Antigua until his appointment as Archdeacon in 1906. During his years in Saint Kitts he was Rector of St. George, Basssseterre.
