= Kante =

Kante may refer to:

- Kante (surname), a surname of African origin
  - N'Golo Kanté (born 1991), French footballer who plays for Fenerbahçe
- Kante, Nepal
- Kante, Tajikistan

== See also ==
- Kanté, a surname
- Kaante, a 2002 Indian Hindi-language film
- Kanteh, a surname
