= SS Ganter =

Cargo ship built in 1927

History
- Name: Ganter (1927–39); Transporter RO 29 (1939–45); Empire Consistance (1945–51); Jan Willem (1950–51); Maria (1951); Dagny (1951–67)
- Owner: Norddeutscher Lloyd (1927–45); Ministry of War Transport (1945); Ministry of Transport (1945–50); Dutch Government (1950–51); H P C Schram (1951); Reederi Ab Sally (1951–67)
- Operator: Norddeutscher Lloyd (1927–33); Argo Reederei AG (1933–36); Argo Reederei Richard Adler & Co (1936–39); Kriegsmarine (1939–45); Ellerman's Wilson Line Ltd (1945–48); Glen & Co Ltd (1948–50); Dutch Government (1950–51); H P C Schram (1951); Algot Johannson (1951–61); Reederi Ab Sally (1961–67)
- Port of registry: (Weimar Republic) Bremen (1927–33); (Nazi Germany) Bremen (1933–39); (Nazi Germany) Kriegsmarine (1939–45); (United Kingdom) London (1945–50); (Netherlands) Den Haag (1950–51); (Netherlands) Ridderkerk (1951); (Finland) Mariehamn (1951–67)
- Builder: G Seebeck AG
- Yard number: 464
- Launched: 1927
- Completed: October 1927
- Out of service: 1 April 1967
- Identification: Code Letters QMGK (1927–34); Code Letters DOGV (1934–45); Code Letters GFGH (1945–51); Code Letters OFRC (1951–67); United Kingdom Official Number 180581 (1945–50); Finnish Official Number 948 (1951–67)
- Fate: Sank

General characteristics
- Type: Cargo ship
- Tonnage: 1,770 GRT; 785 NRT; 2,555 DWT
- Length: 276 ft 9 in (84.35 m)
- Beam: 42 ft 1 in (12.83 m)
- Draught: 17 feet 3 inches (5.26 m)
- Depth: 14 ft 8 in (4.47 m)
- Ice class: 1A (1962–67)
- Installed power: Triple expansion steam engine
- Propulsion: Screw propeller
- Speed: 11 knots (20 km/h)

Ganter was a 1,771 GRT cargo ship that was built in 1927 by G Seebeck AG, Bremerhaven, Germany for German owners. She was requisitioned by the Kriegsmarine during the Second World War and operated as Transporter RO 29, she was seized by the Allies in May 1945. She was passed to the Ministry of War Transport (MoWT) and was renamed Empire Consistance, being sold into merchant service in 1948. In 1950, she was sold to the Dutch government and renamed Jan Willem and then sold and renamed Maria in 1951. She was sold to Finnish owners later that year and being renamed Dagny. She served until she was scrapped in 1967.

== Description ==
The ship was built as yard number 464 by G Seebeck AG, Bremerhaven. She was launched in 1927 and completed in October of that year. The ship was 276 feet 9 inches (84.35 m) long, with a beam of 42 feet 1 inch (12.83 m). She had a depth of 14 feet 8 inches (4.47 m), and a draught of 17 feet 3 inches (5.26 m). The ship had a GRT of 1,771 and a NRT of 785. She had a DWT of 2,555. Her hull was strengthened to enable her to operate in ice. She was propelled by a triple expansion steam engine, which had cylinders of 23 5/8 inches (60 cm), 38 3/16 inches (97.0 cm) and 62 inches (160 cm) diameter by 41 5/16 inches (104.9 cm) stroke. The engine was built by Seebeck, it could propel her at 11 knots (20 km/h).

== History ==
Ganter was built for Norddeutscher Lloyd. Her port of registry was Bremen and the Code Letters QMGK were allocated. In 1933, Norddeutscher Lloyd set up Argo Reederei AG and Ganter was transferred to their management, but remaining in the ownership of Norddeutscher Lloyd. In 1934, her Code Letters were changed to DOGV. In 1936, Argo Reederei AG changed its name to Argo Reederei Richard Adler & Co. On 28 October 1937, Ganter was in collision with the Swedish liner Axel Johnson at Kotka, Finland.

In 1939, Ganter was requisitioned by the Kriegsmarine and renamed Transporter RO 29. She was seized by the Allies in May 1945 at Copenhagen, Denmark. Ownership passed to the MoWT and she was renamed Empire Consistence. Her port of registry was changed to London. The Code Letters GFGH and United Kingdom Official Number 180581 were allocated. She was placed under the management of Ellerman's Wilson Line Ltd. In 1948, management of Empire Consistence was transferred to Glen & Co Ltd, Glasgow.

In 1950, Empire Consistence was sold the Dutch government. She was renamed Jan Willem. In 1951, she was sold to H P C Schram, Ridderkerk and was renamed Maria, before being sold in September that year to Rederi Ab Sally and renamed Dagny. Her port of registry was Mariehamn. The Code Letters OFRC and Finnish Official Number 948 were allocated. She was operated under the management of Algot Johanssen, Mariehamn, until 1962 when operation of the ship was taken over by Rederi Ab Sally. In that year, Dagny was classed as Ice Class 1A. Dagny served until 1967, when she was sold to Eckhardt & Co, Bremen. She arrived at Bremen on 1 April 1967 for scrapping.
