= Kante (surname) =

Kante is a surname of African origin. Alternative spellings include Kanté and Kant. Notable people with the surname include:

- Cédric Kanté (born 1979), Malian football player
- Djibril Kante (born 1980), American basketball player
- Ibrahim Kante (born 1981), Malian football player
- José Kanté (born 1990), Guinean professional footballer born in Spain
- Mory Kanté (1950-2020), Guinean-Malian vocalist
- N'Golo Kanté (born 1991), French football player
- Solomana Kante (1922–1987), Guinean writer
