= Leslie Cant =

English footballer

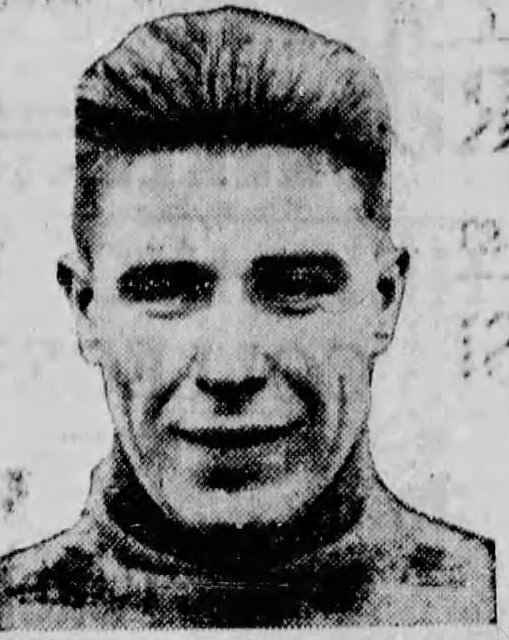
- Cant in 1935

Personal information
- Full name: John Leslie Cant
- Date of birth: 20 February 1908
- Place of birth: Medomsley, England
- Date of death: 19 June 1943 (aged 35)
- Place of death: French Tunisia
- Height: 5 ft 10 1/2 in (1.79 m)
- Position: Goalkeeper

Youth career
- 1923: Trimdon Grange

Senior career*
Years	Team	Apps	(Gls)
1926	Birtley		
1927	Consett		
1929	Eden Colliery Welfare		
1929	Leadgate Park		
1930	Shotton Colliery Welfare		
1930	Crook Town		
1932	York City	0	(0)
1932	Chester-le-Street		
1934	Bury	4	(0)
1934–1935	Stockport County	1	(0)
1935	Southport	11	(0)
1935	Northwich Victoria		
1936	South Shields		
1937	Consett		
1938	Whitley and Monkseaton		
Total		16	(0)
- * Club domestic league appearances and goals

John Leslie Cant (20 February 1908 – 19 June 1943) was an English professional footballer who played as a goalkeeper in the Football League for Southport.

== Personal life ==
Son of Thomas and Mary Ann Cant, Cant was married with a wife Ella, and served as a lance corporal in the Durham Light Infantry (DLI) during the Second World War, having enlisted after employment at a steel works. While serving with the 16th Battalion, DLI, part of the 46th Infantry Division, he was severely wounded, losing limbs, by an explosion during the final stages of the Tunisian campaign and died of wounds nine weeks later on 19 June 1943. He is buried at Bone War Cemetery, Annaba.

== Career statistics ==
Appearances and goals by club, season and competition
Club	Season	League			FA Cup		Total	
Club	Season	Division	Apps	Goals	Apps	Goals	Apps	Goals
Bury	1933–34	Second Division	4	0	0	0	4	0
Stockport County	1934–35	Third Division North	1	0	0	0	1	0
Southport	1934–35	Third Division North	11	0	0	0	11	0
Career total			16	0	0	0	16	0
