= Kanth (surname) =

Kanth, also spelt Kant, is an Indian surname. Notable people with the surname include:

- Amod Kanth, Indian social activist and former policeman
- Amitabh Kant IAS, Indian bureaucrat and former CEO of NITI Aayog
- Anil Kant IPS, Indian police officer and current DGP of Kerala Police
- Emmalotta Kanth, known as Etta, Finnish musician
- Kanth Kaler (born 1994), Punjabi singer
- Melvinder Kanth, Singaporean film-maker and actor
- Rajani Kannepalli Kanth, American economist and philosopher
