= Knesebeck =

- Stadtteil of Wittingen
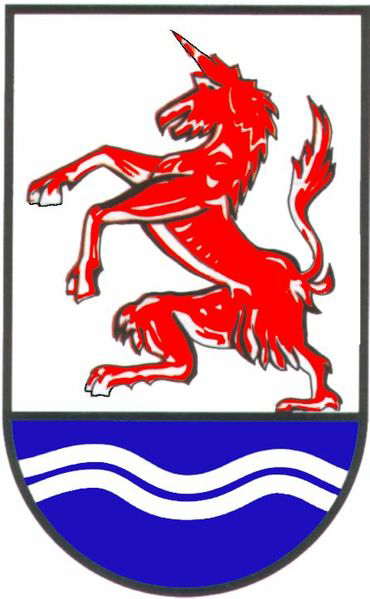
- Coat of arms
- Interactive map of Knesebeck
- Location within Germany Location within Lower Saxony
- Coordinates: 52°40′N 10°42′E
- Country: Germany
- State: Lower Saxony
- District: Gifhorn
- Town: Wittingen

Area
  - Total: 34.09 km^{2} (13.16 sq mi)
- Elevation: 70 m (230 ft)

Population (2017-12-31)
  - Total: 2,683
  - Density: 78.70/km^{2} (203.8/sq mi)
- Time zone: UTC+01:00 (CET)
  - Summer (DST): UTC+02:00 (CEST)
- Postal codes: 29379
- Dialling codes: +495834
- Vehicle registration: GF
- Website: www.knesebeck.org

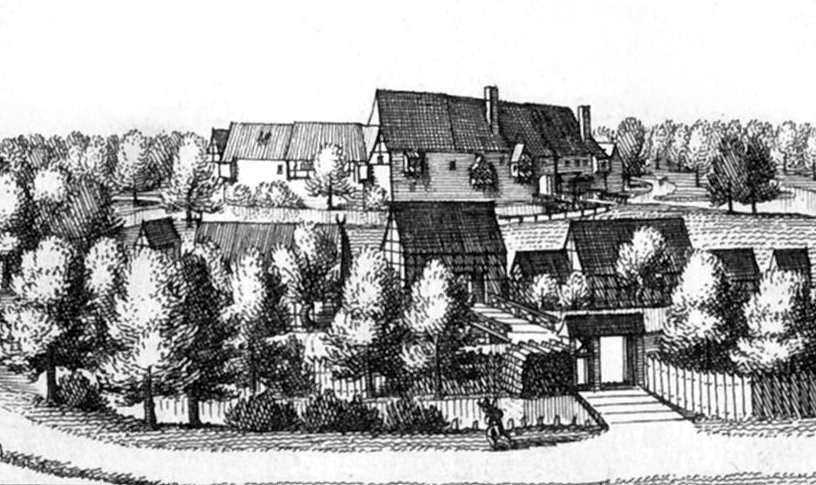
Castle Knesebeck engraving by Merian, ca. 1650

Spielmannszug Jägercorps Knesebeck performing at the traditional Schützenfest

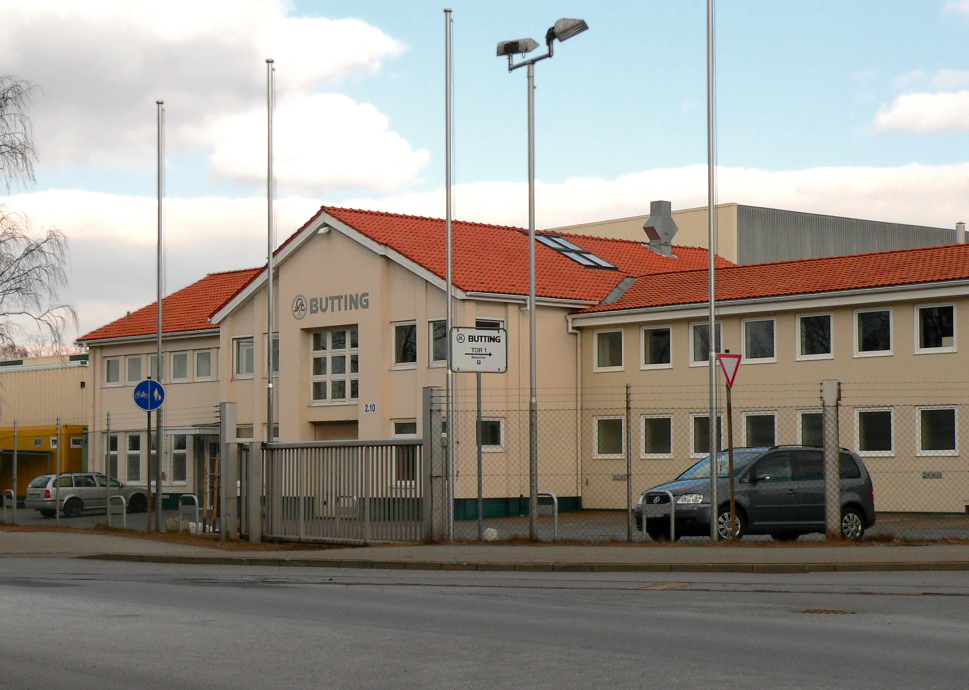
Butting Gruppe GmbH & Co. KG, company site

Knesebeck summer landscape

Knesebeck is a village in Gifhorn (district) (Lower-Saxony). It is home to an important industry (Butting Gruppe GmbH & Co. KG) in the region.

== Associations and Cultural Life ==
For events of the various local clubs, see the calendar of events.

=== Music Clubs ===
- Spielmannszug Jägercorps Knesebeck
- Spielmannszug Schwarzes Corps Knesebeck
- Musikzug der Freiwilligen Feuerwehr Knesebeck
- Knesebecker Bläserkreis

=== Sports Clubs ===
- VFL Knesebeck
- Lauftreff Isenhagener Land

=== Activities ===
- Freiwillige Feuerwehr Knesebeck
- Riding club

== Economy ==
Industry

- Butting Gruppe GmbH & Co. KG

Consulting

- Steuerkanzlei Wolter

Media

- Druckerei Kirchhoff

Craft

- Bau- und Möbeltischlerei Holler GmbH

Schools and conferencing facilities

- Knesebeck primary school
- Butting Academy
- Private music school

== Health Care ==
- Dr. Supady, general practitioner
- Dr. Dettmer, general practitioner
- Erik Lühe, dentist
- Einhorn-Apotheke Knesebeck, pharmacy

== Traffic and Infrastructure ==
Knesebeck is connected to the Deutsche Bahn railway network. Connections are slow, but they provide good access to the German high-speed railway network via Wolfsburg, Braunschweig and Uelzen. The Wolfsburg high-speed connections allow an easy access to the airports in Hannover, Berlin and Frankfurt. Volkswagen operates regular business flights from the Braunschweig/Wolfsburg airport.

== Tourism and Spare Time ==
There are possible opportunities in Knesebeck for jogging, hunting and horse-riding. Sport facilities are provided by the Knesebeck sports associations. There is a public outdoor swimming area which is a natural lake, a small indoor pool and sauna.

Attractions in the region are the Lüneburger Heide, the Otterzentrum in Hankensbüttel, the Phaeno and Autostadt in Wolfsburg, the historic old towns of Celle, Lüneburg und Salzwedel as well as the Museumsdorf Hösseringen.

== Personalities ==
- Ernst von Lenthe, (* 23. November 1823 in Knesebeck, † 7. February 1888 in Hannover): Oberappellationsgerichtsrat, deputy
- Bernd Fix (* 19. March 1962): Hacker (Chaos Computer Club)
- Lars Nieberg (* 24. Juli 1963): Winner in the Olympic Games, Equestrian / Jumping
