= Surya Kant (businessman) =

Indian businessman

- Born: Delhi, India
- Education: Delhi College of Engineering, Indian Institute of Technology, Delhi
- Occupation: Senior Advisor Tata Sons Private Limited. Former Chairman North America Tata Consultancy Services

Surya "Sury" Kant is a Senior Advisor at Tata Sons Private Limited. He was the Chairman of TCS North American operations based in New York City until March 2022. Tata Consultancy Services Limited (TCS) is the largest global information technology consulting and services company located in India.

In 1990s, Kant was appointed the head of operations for TCS in the United Kingdom. Until 2005, he served as the Head of Operations for the India Northern Region of TCS and until 2020 served as the President of the North America, Europe and the UK operations.

Kant is a frequent speaker at industry conferences and academic institutions. Kant served as an advisory board member of the British-American Business, and the past Chairman of the India Business Forum (IBF) of the Confederation of India (CII) in the US. He was a member of the Wall Street Journal (WSJ) CEO Council and a member of the Fortune CEO Initiative. He served on the Greater New York Red Cross Board from February 2020 to March 2022. He joined CECP (Chief Executives for Corporate Purpose) Board in May 2020 and in April 2022 was appointed as the Board Member Emeritus.
